= 2014–15 DEL season =

- League: Deutsche Eishockey Liga
- Sport: Ice Hockey
- Duration: 12 September–24 April
- Games: 364
- Teams: 14
- Total attendance: 2,336,670
- Average attendance: 6,419

Regular season
- Season champions: Adler Mannheim
- Top scorer: (Canada) Steven Reinprecht (Thomas Sabo Ice Tigers) (67 points)

Finals
- Champions: Adler Mannheim
- Runners-up: ERC Ingolstadt

DEL seasons
- ← 2013–14 2015–16 →

The 2014–15 Deutsche Eishockey Liga season was the 21st season since the founding of the Deutsche Eishockey Liga. It started on 12 September 2014 and ended on 22 April 2015.

== Teams ==
Teams of the 2014–15 DEL season

Team	City	Arena
Augsburger Panther	Augsburg	Curt Frenzel Stadium
Eisbären Berlin	Berlin	O2 World
Düsseldorfer EG	Düsseldorf	ISS Dome
Hamburg Freezers	Hamburg	Color Line Arena
ERC Ingolstadt	Ingolstadt	Saturn Arena
Iserlohn Roosters	Iserlohn	Eissporthalle Iserlohn
Kölner Haie	Cologne	Lanxess Arena
Krefeld Pinguine	Krefeld	König Palast
Adler Mannheim	Mannheim	SAP Arena
Red Bull München	Munich	Olympia Eishalle
Thomas Sabo Ice Tigers	Nuremberg	Nuremberg Arena
Schwenninger Wild Wings	Villingen-Schwenningen	Helios Arena
Straubing Tigers	Straubing	Eisstadion am Pulverturm
Grizzly Adams Wolfsburg	Wolfsburg	Eisarena Wolfsburg

== Regular season ==
=== Standings ===
Pos	Team	Pld	W	OTW	OTL	L	GF	GA	GD	Pts	Qualification
1	Adler Mannheim	52	33	3	2	14	173	123	+50	107	Advance to playoffs
2	EHC München	52	28	5	4	15	166	127	+39	98	Advance to playoffs
3	ERC Ingolstadt	52	29	1	5	17	182	152	+30	94	Advance to playoffs
4	Hamburg Freezers	52	27	1	7	17	161	154	+7	90	Advance to playoffs
5	DEG Metro Stars	52	24	6	3	19	157	151	+6	87	Advance to playoffs
6	Iserlohn Roosters	52	23	5	7	17	179	150	+29	86	Advance to playoffs
7	EHC Wolfsburg	52	22	6	6	18	152	136	+16	84	Advance to playoff qualification round
8	Thomas Sabo Ice Tigers	52	21	6	5	20	170	145	+25	80	Advance to playoff qualification round
9	Eisbären Berlin	52	20	7	4	21	162	143	+19	78	Advance to playoff qualification round
10	Krefeld Pinguine	52	20	7	2	23	156	168	−12	76	Advance to playoff qualification round
11	Kölner Haie	52	19	4	6	23	124	149	−25	71	
12	Augsburger Panther	52	14	3	5	30	139	185	−46	53	
13	Straubing Tigers	52	10	5	5	32	103	168	−65	45	
14	Schwenninger Wild Wings	52	12	3	1	36	106	179	−73	43	

Source: DEL

=== Results ===
==== Matches 1–26 ====
Home \ Away	AUG	BER	DÜS	HAM	ING	ISE	KÖL	KRE	MAN	MUN	NÜR	SCH	STR	WOL
Augsburg		4–1	7–4	6–4	3–2 ^{OT}	1–4	5–2	3–2 ^{OT}	0–3	2–3	1–4	4–0	3–1	5–4 ^{OT}
Berlin	5–1		2–1	7–3	2–5	1–3	2–3 ^{SO}	4–3 ^{SO}	2–4	2–3	3–0	2–1	5–1	1–0
DEG	5–4 ^{SO}	5–2		4–1	2–3	5–3	5–4	0–1	2–3	1–2 ^{OT}	4–3 ^{SO}	4–1	6–3	2–3 ^{SO}
Hamburg	5–0	3–4 ^{SO}	2–4		4–3	4–3	1–3	3–1	6–3	3–6	8–1	3–1	4–5	3–1
Ingolstadt	2–4	3–2	5–4	3–4 ^{SO}		5–2	2–3 ^{OT}	6–3	1–2	4–3	5–0	7–4	5–1	2–4
Iserlohn	1–2	2–5	8–0	2–1 ^{SO}	3–5		4–1	4–2	3–4 ^{OT}	3–2	1–2 ^{OT}	4–3	3–2	6–1
Köln	1–0	2–3 ^{OT}	2–1	5–1	4–5	2–4		0–1	0–3	2–1 ^{OT}	5–3	1–4	3–2	1–4
Krefeld	2–1 ^{OT}	4–3	3–2 ^{OT}	3–2 ^{OT}	6–4	1–4	3–0		5–2	2–5	5–3	3–1	7–3	0–6
Mannheim	4–3 ^{SO}	6–4	3–2	1–4	5–2	4–3	4–1	5–1		4–0	4–0	4–1	4–0	7–3
Munich	4–3	1–3	4–3	0–3	4–1	1–2 ^{OT}	4–1	4–5 ^{SO}	2–5		4–1	7–0	2–1	3–0
Nürnberg	5–1	3–1	1–4	6–1	9–1	3–2 ^{SO}	4–3 ^{SO}	3–2	1–2	2–3 ^{SO}		2–3	2–1	6–3
Schwenningen	4–2	2–4	1–4	2–3	0–3	3–2	3–6	3–2	5–2	1–3	1–3		6–1	1–9
Straubing	4–2	5–4	1–2 ^{OT}	2–5	2–4	3–2 ^{OT}	3–2 ^{SO}	1–3	1–5	2–7	5–4	2–1		0–4
Wolfsburg	5–4 ^{OT}	4–3 ^{OT}	7–0	2–5	3–5	3–2	3–0	4–5 ^{SO}	5–6 ^{SO}	1–5	4–3 ^{SO}	1–2 ^{SO}	2–1	

==== Matches 27–52 ====
Home \ Away	AUS	BER	DÜS	HAM	ING	ISE	KÖL	KRE	MAN	MUN	NÜR	SCH	STR	WOL
Augsburg		2–6	1–4	3–4	6–7	7–4	3–1	2–3	3–1	2–3	2–10	5–2	4–1	2–3
Berlin	6–4		5–2	4–3 ^{SO}	3–2 ^{OT}	2–3	6–1	4–6	0–2	5–0	3–2 ^{SO}	4–0	2–0	3–1
DEG	3–1	4–3 ^{SO}		2–6	3–1	3–6	3–2	4–5	2–4	7–3	6–5	4–0	3–2 ^{SO}	3–1
Hamburg	4–0	1–4	2–3		2–1	9–4	3–2	5–6 ^{SO}	2–3	2–1	4–1	2–0	3–2	5–4
Ingolstadt	6–3	5–3	2–1	9–0		3–4 ^{SO}	5–3	3–4	2–3	3–2	2–1	3–1	6–1	2–4
Iserlohn	5–2	5–3	8–1	4–1	3–4 ^{SO}		7–1	9–1	6–3	2–3 ^{OT}	3–4 ^{SO}	3–1	2–3	2–4
Köln	5–4 ^{OT}	3–4 ^{SO}	1–3	1–4	3–2	3–4 ^{SO}		4–2	5–3	2–1	3–2	3–1	1–0	1–2 ^{OT}
Krefeld	6–2	4–1	2–3	3–2 ^{OT}	1–3	2–4	3–5		5–2	2–4	3–6	6–1	2–0	1–2
Mannheim	3–2	3–2	3–4 ^{OT}	1–2	2–4	4–2	2–3	5–1		4–5	3–1	5–2	3–0	3–4 ^{OT}
Munich	4–2	6–3	2–3	4–2 ^{OT}	4–2	8–1	4–2	3–1	1–3		4–2	5–2	5–4 ^{OT}	2–1
Nürnberg	4–2	1–3	4–1	5–0	6–1	5–1	4–2	6–3	4–0	5–4 ^{SO}		6–1	3–2 ^{SO}	1–4
Schwenningen	6–1	4–3 ^{OT}	1–3	1–2	2–1	1–3	1–6	7–2	1–5	4–0	7–5		3–2 ^{SO}	0–2
Straubing	0–1	3–2	1–4	6–3	2–5	4–1	0–2	1–3	1–4	4–0	2–1 ^{SO}	4–3 ^{SO}		3–2 ^{SO}
Wolfsburg	4–3	4–2	1–2	3–2	2–4	2–3 ^{OT}	1–2	5–2	2–0	0–6	1–2	3–0	4–2	

=== Statistics ===
==== Scoring leaders ====
List shows the top skaters sorted by points, then goals.

Player	GP	G	A	Pts	+/−	PIM	POS
(Canada) Steven Reinprecht	52	21	46	67	+24	20	F
(Canada) Kevin Clark	52	32	34	66	+29	78	F
(Germany) Patrick Reimer	52	29	33	62	+25	44	F
(Canada) Brandon Buck	51	28	31	59	+20	6	F
(Germany) Daniel Pietta	52	17	42	59	+21	38	F
(Canada) Nick Petersen	51	22	31	53	+11	60	F
(Norway) Ken André Olimb	51	13	39	52	+1	18	F
(United States) Garrett Roe	51	13	38	51	+21	56	D
(Canada) Ryan MacMurchy	42	21	29	50	+24	68	F
(Canada) Marco Rosa	52	9	37	46	+1	18	F

GP = Games played; G = Goals; A = Assists; Pts = Points; +/− = Plus/minus; PIM = Penalties in minutes; POS = Position
Source: DEL.org

==== Leading goaltenders ====
Only the top five goaltenders, based on save percentage, who have played at least 40% of their team's minutes, are included in this list.

Player	TOI	GA	GAA	SA	Sv%	SO
(Germany) Niklas Treutle	1744:03	60	2.06	782	92.3	1
(Germany) Felix Brueckmann	1387:58	48	2.07	671	92.8	3
(Germany) Dennis Endras	2391:45	93	2.33	1095	91.5	6
(Canada) Sébastien Caron	1905:49	79	2.49	1038	92.4	3
(Finland) Petri Vehanen	2485:11	104	2.51	1254	91.7	4

TOI = Time on ice (minutes:seconds); SA = Shots against; GA = Goals against; GAA = Goals against average; Sv% = Save percentage; SO = Shutouts

Source: DEL.org

== Playoffs ==
=== Playoff qualification ===
The playoff qualification was played between 4–8 March 2015 in a best-of-three mode.

==== EHC Wolfsburg vs. Krefeld Pinguine ====
4 March	EHC Wolfsburg	4–3	Krefeld Pinguine	Eisarena Wolfsburg, Wolfsburg	Recap
Sebastian Furchner (PP) – 09:35		First period	08:36 – Joshua Meyers; 19:18 – Marcel Mueller
Christoph Hoehenleitner – 31:05		Second period	31:19 – Mueller
Marco Rosa (PP) – 48:15		Third period	No scoring
Tyler Scofield – 77:50		Overtime	No scoring
Felix Brueckmann (22 saves / 25 shots)		Goalie stats	Tomáš Duba (22 saves / 26 shots)

6 March	Krefeld Pinguine	2–0	EHC Wolfsburg	König Palast, Krefeld	Recap
No scoring		First period	No Scoring
Daniel Pietta – 33:17; Marcel Mueller (SH) – 39:48		Second period	No scoring
No scoring		Third period	No scoring
Tomáš Duba (34 saves / 34 shots)		Goalie stats	Felix Brueckmann (32 saves / 34 shots)

8 March	EHC Wolfsburg	3–2	Krefeld Pinguine	Eisarena Wolfsburg, Wolfsburg	Recap
No Scoring		First period	01:32 – Mike Mieszkowski
Tyler Haskins (PS) – 23:19; Matthew Dzieduszycki – 36:11		Second period	39:16 – Daniel Pietta
Haskins – 54:58		Third period	No scoring
Felix Brueckmann (41 saves / 43 shots)		Goalie stats	Tomáš Duba (26 saves / 29 shots)

Wolfsburg won series 2–1

==== Thomas Sabo Ice Tigers vs. Eisbären Berlin ====
4 March	Thomas Sabo Ice Tigers	6–2	Eisbären Berlin	Nuremberg Arena, Nuremberg	Recap
Leonhard Pföderl – 07:03; Pföderl – 18:33; Patrick Reimer – 19:30		First period	No scoring
Corey Locke – 33:11; Kyle Klubertanz (PP) – 35:29		Second period	43:27 – Frank Hördler
Pföderl (ENG) – 57:05		Third period	45:56 – Jullian Talbot
Jochen Reimer (30 saves / 32 shots)		Goalie stats	Petri Vehanen (23 saves / 28 shots); Mathias Niederberger (2 saves / 2 shots)

6 March	Eisbären Berlin	6–3	Thomas Sabo Ice Tigers	O_{2} World, Berlin	Recap
Antti Miettinen (SH) – 04:58; Henry Haase – 08:13; Jullian Talbot (PP) – 15:24		First period	03:22 – Leonhard Pföderl (PP)
Marcel Noebels (PP) – 23:29; Miettinen – 27:18		Second period	No scoring
Petr Pohl (PP) – 51:57		Third period	54:05 – Patrick Buzas; 57:35 – Jason Jaspers (PP)
Petri Vehanen (33 saves / 36 shots)		Goalie stats	Jochen Reimer (15 saves / 20 shots); Andreas Jenike (13 saves / 14 shots)

8 March	Thomas Sabo Ice Tigers	3–2	Eisbären Berlin	Nuremberg Arena, Nuremberg	Recap
No scoring		First period	No scoring
Yasin Ehliz – 31:24; Steven Reinprecht – 36:30		Second period	No scoring
No scoring		Third period	41:31 – Jullian Talbot; 51:46 – Casey Borer (PP)
Jason Jaspers (PP) – 52:57		Overtime	No scoring
Jochen Reimer (30 saves / 32 shots)		Goalie stats	Petri Vehanen (23 saves / 28 shots)

Nuremberg won series 2–1

=== Bracket ===
Quarterfinals
1	Adler Mannheim	4
8	Thomas Sabo Ice Tigers	1
2	EHC München	0
7	EHC Wolfsburg	4
(Pairings are reseeded after the first round)
3	ERC Ingolstadt	4
6	Iserlohn Roosters	3
4	Hamburg Freezers	3
5	Düsseldorfer EG	4

Semifinals
1	Adler Mannheim	4
7	EHC Wolfsburg	0
3	ERC Ingolstadt	4
5	Düsseldorfer EG	1

Finals
1	Adler Mannheim	4
3	ERC Ingolstadt	2

=== Quarterfinals ===
The quarterfinals were played between 11–24 March 2015 in a best-of-seven mode.

==== Adler Mannheim vs. Thomas Sabo Ice Tigers ====
11 March	Adler Mannheim	2–1	Thomas Sabo Ice Tigers	SAP Arena, Mannheim	Recap
No scoring		First period	No scoring
Matthias Plachta – 20:22; Jon Rheault – 24:37		Second period	37:43 – Leonhard Pföderl
No scoring		Third period	No scoring
Dennis Endras (16 saves / 17 shots)		Goalie stats	Jochen Reimer (34 saves / 36 shots)

13 March	Thomas Sabo Ice Tigers	3–2	Adler Mannheim	Nuremberg Arena, Nuremberg	Recap
Leonhard Pföderl (PP) – 05:44		First period	03:42 – Kai Hospelt; 18:28 – Matthias Plachta
No scoring		Second period	No scoring
Tim Schuele – 46:04; Corey Locke – 57:48		Third period	No scoring
Jochen Reimer (31 saves / 33 shots)		Goalie stats	Dennis Endras (14 saves / 17 shots)

15 March	Adler Mannheim	6–1	Thomas Sabo Ice Tigers	SAP Arena, Mannheim	Recap
Sinan Akdag – 08:17; Kai Hospelt – 14:00		First period	35:00 – Patrick Reimer (EA)
Glen Metropolit – 27:08; Marcus Kink (SH, EA) – 29:12		Second period	No scoring
Frank Mauer – 49:54; Daniel Richmond (PP) – 56:43		Third period	No scoring
Dennis Endras (30 saves / 31 shots)		Goalie stats	Jochen Reimer (32 saves / 38 shots)

17 March	Thomas Sabo Ice Tigers	0–3	Adler Mannheim	Nuremberg Arena, Nuremberg	Recap
No scoring		First period	No scoring
No scoring		Second period	23:05 – Jochen Hecht (PS); 28:55 – Denis Reul
No scoring		Third period	55:54 – Christoph Ullmann
Jochen Reimer (33 saves / 36 shots)		Goalie stats	Dennis Endras (41 saves / 41 shots)

20 March	Adler Mannheim	4–3	OT	Thomas Sabo Ice Tigers	SAP Arena, Mannheim	Recap
No scoring		First period		14:40 – Yasin Ehliz (PP); 15:30 – Leonhard Pföderl
Kai Hospelt (PP) – 25:57; Frank Mauer – 28:27; Christoph Ullmann – 35:38		Second period		30:27 – Marcus Weber
No scoring		Third period		No scoring
Mauer – 66:39		First overtime period		No scoring
Dennis Endras (20 saves / 23 shots)		Goalie stats		Andreas Jenike (50 saves / 54 shots)

Mannheim won series 4–1

==== EHC München vs. EHC Wolfsburg ====
11 March	EHC München	0–4	EHC Wolfsburg	Olympia Eishalle, Munich	Recap
No scoring		First period	No scoring
No scoring		Second period	24:47 – Christoph Höhenleitner; 31:53 – Vincenz Mayer; 36:31 – Tyler Scofield
No scoring		Third period	55:59 – Jeffrey Likens (SH)
Florian Hardy (27 saves / 30 shots)		Goalie stats	Felix Brückmann (31 saves / 31 shots)

13 March	EHC Wolfsburg	3–2	EHC München	Eisarena Wolfsburg, Wolfsburg	Recap
Marco Rosa (PP) – 03:21		First period	No scoring
Tyson Mulock – 28:29		Second period	31:44 – Daniel Sparre (PP)
Timothy Hambly – 40:38		Third period	58:47 – Richard Regehr (PP2, EA)
Felix Brückmann (19 saves / 21 shots)		Goalie stats	Florian Hardy (13 saves / 16 shots)

15 March	EHC München	0–2	EHC Wolfsburg	Olympia Eishalle, Munich	Recap
No scoring		First period	08:08 – Aleksander Polaczek
No scoring		Second period	No scoring
No scoring		Third period	59:33 – Sebastian Furchner (ENG)
Florian Hardy (23 saves / 24 shots)		Goalie stats	Felix Brückmann (27 saves / 27 shots)

17 March	EHC Wolfsburg	4–3	EHC München	Eisarena Wolfsburg, Wolfsburg	Recap
Matthew Dzieduszycki (PP) – 16:17; Sebastian Furchner (PP) – 18:38		First period	05:39 – Jeremy Dehner (PP)
Dzieduszycki (PP) – 28:04		Second period	34:52 – Daniel Sparre
Furchner (PP) – 48:22		Third period	59:40 – Michael Wolf (PP)
Felix Brückmann (27 saves / 27 shots)		Goalie stats	Florian Hardy (23 saves / 24 shots)

Wolfsburg won series 4–0

==== ERC Ingolstadt vs. Iserlohn Roosters ====
11 March	ERC Ingolstadt	4–3	Iserlohn Roosters	Saturn Arena, Ingolstadt	Recap
Jared Ross (PP) – 02:55; Ross – 18:47		First period	07:34 – Derek Whitmore (PP)
Brendan Brooks – 27:00; Patrick Hager (PP) – 38:47		Second period	24:49 – Whitmore
No scoring		Third period	58:26 – Alexander Foster (PP, EA)
Timo Pielmeier (23 saves / 26 shots)		Goalie stats	Mathias Lange (26 saves / 30 shots)

13 March	Iserlohn Roosters	6–3	ERC Ingolstadt	Eissporthalle Iserlohn, Iserlohn	Recap
Jonas Liwing – 14:03; Alexander Foster – 14:28		First period	05:43 – Brandon Buck
No scoring		Second period	23:38 – Buck; 32:31 – Jean-Francois Boucher
Mike York – 48:07; York – 53:17; York – 57:36; Colten Teubert (SH) – 59:59		Third period	No scoring
Mathias Lange (36 saves / 39 shots)		Goalie stats	Timo Pielmeier (32 saves / 37 shots)

15 March	ERC Ingolstadt	3–1	Iserlohn Roosters	Saturn Arena, Ingolstadt	Recap
No scoring		First period	No scoring
No scoring		Second period	22:46 – Brooks Macek (SH)
Petr Tatíček – 43:17; John Laliberte – 47:46; John Laliberte (EA, ENG) – 59:39		Third period	No scoring
Timo Pielmeier (27 saves / 28 shots)		Goalie stats	Mathias Lange (25 saves / 27 shots); Daniar Dshunussow (9 saves / 9 shots)

17 March	Iserlohn Roosters	5–0	ERC Ingolstadt	Eissporthalle Iserlohn, Iserlohn	Recap
No scoring		First period	No scoring
Sean Sullivan – 24:05; Brooks Macek (PP) – 25:40; Brent Raedeke (SH) – 33:57		Second period	No scoring
Sullivan – 52:01; Brodie Dupont (PP2) – 57:08		Third period	No scoring
Daniar Dshunussow (30 saves / 30 shots)		Goalie stats	Timo Pielmeier (37 saves / 42 shots)

20 March	ERC Ingolstadt	4–3	2OT	Iserlohn Roosters	Saturn Arena, Ingolstadt	Recap
Aaron Brocklehurst (PP) – 07:08		First period		09:22 – Chris Connolly
Alexandre Picard – 27:25		Second period		24:58 – Sean Sullivan
Dustin Friesen – 47:39		Third period		59:56 – Brent Raedeke (PP, EA)
Jeff Szwez – 82:21		Second overtime period		No scoring
Timo Pielmeier (36 saves / 39 shots)		Goalie stats		Daniar Dshunussow (36 saves / 40 shots)

22 March	Iserlohn Roosters	6–2	ERC Ingolstadt	Eissporthalle Iserlohn, Iserlohn	Recap
Chad Bassen – 01:17		First period	No scoring
Alexander Foster (PP) – 25:54; Chris Connolly (SH) – 30:44; Dylan Wruck (PP) – 32:40; Colten Teubert – 32:44		Second period	20:32 – Patrick Hager (PP)
Brodie Dupont (PP) – 55:47		Third period	47:33 – Ryan MacMurchy
Mathias Lange (35 saves / 37 shots)		Goalie stats	Timo Pielmeier (23 saves / 27 shots); Marco Eisenhut (12 saves / 14 shots)

24 March	ERC Ingolstadt	6–1	Iserlohn Roosters	Saturn Arena, Ingolstadt	Recap
Alexandre Picard – 10:31; Brandon Buck – 19:45		First period	03:52 – Cody Sylvester
Benedikt Kohl – 22:17		Second period	No scoring
Christoph Gawlik – 49:28; Jared Ross – 53:39; Ross (ENG) – 58:07		Third period	No scoring
Timo Pielmeier (29 saves / 30 shots)		Goalie stats	Mathias Lange (22 saves / 27 shots)

Ingolstadt won series 4–3

==== Hamburg Freezers vs. Düsseldorfer EG ====
11 March	Hamburg Freezers	4–0	Düsseldorfer EG	O_{2} World, Hamburg	Recap
Thomas Oppenheimer – 05:52; Matt Pettinger (PP) – 10:28; Garrett Festerling – 17:47		First period	No scoring
No scoring		Second period	No scoring
Mathieu Roy (SH, ENG) – 58:25		Third period	No scoring
Sébastien Caron (21 saves / 21 shots)		Goalie stats	Tyler Beskorowany (23 saves / 26 shots)

13 March	Düsseldorfer EG	6–3	Hamburg Freezers	ISS Dome, Düsseldorf	Recap
No scoring		First period	14:10 – Matt Pettinger
Daniel Kreutzer – 25:28; Michael Davies (PP) – 33:01; Rob Collins (PP) – 35:21; Davies (PP) – 38:37		Second period	39:55 – Druval Westcott (EA)
Alexei Dmitriev – 56:22; Andreas Martinsen – 57:19		Third period	41:17 – Martin Sertich (PS)
Tyler Beskorowany (13 saves / 16 shots)		Goalie stats	Sébastien Caron (19 saves / 25 shots)

15 March	Hamburg Freezers	3–2	Düsseldorfer EG	O_{2} World, Hamburg	Recap
Morten Madsen – 01:00		First period	No scoring
Adam Mitchell (PP) – 25:19		Second period	35:52 – Bernhard Ebner; 39:44 – Rob Collins
Thomas Oppenheimer (PP) – 55:30		Third period	No scoring
Sébastien Caron (23 saves / 25 shots)		Goalie stats	Tyler Beskorowany (22 saves / 25 shots)

17 March	Düsseldorfer EG	2–1	Hamburg Freezers	ISS Dome, Düsseldorf	Recap
No scoring		First period	No scoring
Ken André Olimb (PP) – 30:12; Alexander Thiel – 37:06		Second period	33:44 – Adam Mitchell
No scoring		Third period	No scoring
Tyler Beskorowany (35 saves / 36 shots)		Goalie stats	Sébastien Caron (25 saves / 27 shots)

20 March	Hamburg Freezers	4–2	Düsseldorfer EG	O_{2} World, Hamburg	Recap
Thomas Oppenheimer – 10:12		First period	No scoring
No scoring		Second period	27:32 – Alexander Thiel
Morten Madsen (PP) – 47:04; Madsen – 52:02; Adam Mitchell (SH, ENG) – 59:01		Third period	54:51 – Michael Davies (PP, EA)
Sébastien Caron (26 saves / 28 shots)		Goalie stats	Tyler Beskorowany (31 saves / 34 shots)

22 March	Düsseldorfer EG	4–3	Hamburg Freezers	ISS Dome, Düsseldorf	Recap
Shawn Belle – 08:27		First period	No scoring
Daniel Fischbuch – 25:44; Bernhard Ebner – 29:25		Second period	24:19 – Samuel Klassen
Alexander Preibisch – 53:18		Third period	51:57 – Adam Mitchell; 52:53 – Druval Westcott
Tyler Beskorowany (25 saves / 28 shots)		Goalie stats	Sébastien Caron (23 saves / 27 shots)

24 March	Hamburg Freezers	1–2	Düsseldorfer EG	O_{2} World, Hamburg	Recap
No scoring		First period	No scoring
Kevin Clark – 32:28		Second period	29:14 – Manuel Strodel (SH)
No scoring		Third period	40:28 – Travis Turnbull
Sébastien Caron (23 saves / 25 shots)		Goalie stats	Tyler Beskorowany (32 saves / 33 shots)

Düsseldorf won series 4–3

=== Semifinals ===
The semifinals were played between 27 March to 4 April 2015 in a best-of-seven mode.

==== Adler Mannheim vs. EHC Wolfsburg ====
27 March	Adler Mannheim	5–4	OT	EHC Wolfsburg	SAP Arena, Mannheim	Recap
No scoring		First period		18:46 – Marco Rosa
Matthias Plachta (PP) – 30:25; Glen Metropolit – 38:38		Second period		23:53 – Christoph Höhenleitner; 26:46 – Norman Milley; 36:07 – Höhenleitner
Sinan Akdag – 50:12; Frank Mauer – 50:31		Third period		No scoring
Jonathan Rheault – 64:00		First overtime period		No scoring
Dennis Endras (13 saves / 17 shots); Youri Ziffzer (9 saves / 9 shots)		Goalie stats		Felix Brückmann (53 saves / 58 shots)

29 March	EHC Wolfsburg	3–5	Adler Mannheim	Eisarena Wolfsburg, Wolfsburg	Recap
Tyler Scofield (PP) – 05:01; Sergej Stas – 07:06; Jeffrey Likens – 07:35		First period	09:58 – Andrew Joudrey (PP); 15:07 – Frank Mauer
No scoring		Second period	39:47 – Matthias Plachta (PP2)
No scoring		Third period	57:00 – Mauer; 58:51 – Marcus Kink (ENG)
Felix Brückmann (33 saves / 37 shots)		Goalie stats	Dennis Endras (29 saves / 32 shots)

31 March	Adler Mannheim	4–0	EHC Wolfsburg	SAP Arena, Mannheim	Recap
Andrew Joudrey (PP) – 09:55		First period	No scoring
Mirko Höfflin – 31:23		Second period	No scoring
Jochen Hecht (PP) – 40:41; Denis Reul (ENG) – 59:12		Third period	No scoring
Dennis Endras (27 saves / 27 shots)		Goalie stats	Felix Brückmann (37 saves / 40 shots)

2 April	EHC Wolfsburg	3–5	Adler Mannheim	Eisarena Wolfsburg, Wolfsburg	Recap
No scoring		First period	No scoring
Matthew Dzieduszycki – 20:32; Norman Milley (PP) – 32:24; Sebastian Furchner – 38:13		Second period	No scoring
No scoring		Third period	44:48 – Matthias Plachta (PP2); 48:24 – Jochen Hecht (PP); 53:42 – Kurtis Foster; 59:28 – Kai Hospelt; 59:44 – Andrew Joudrey (ENG)
Felix Brückmann (33 saves / 37 shots)		Goalie stats	Dennis Endras (29 saves / 32 shots)

Mannheim won series 4–0

==== ERC Ingolstadt vs. Düsseldorfer EG ====
27 March	ERC Ingolstadt	1–2	OT	Düsseldorfer EG	Saturn Arena, Ingolstadt	Recap
No scoring		First period		06:15 – Alexander Thiel
No scoring		Second period		No scoring
Thomas Greilinger – 53:55		Third period		No scoring
No scoring		First overtime period		63:28 – Kristopher Sparre
Timo Pielmeier (20 saves / 22 shots)		Goalie stats		Tyler Beskorowany (35 saves / 36 shots)

29 March	Düsseldorfer EG	2–5	ERC Ingolstadt	ISS Dome, Düsseldorf	Recap
No scoring		First period	No scoring
Alexander Preibisch – 24:32; Thomas Dolak – 27:00		Second period	27:26 – Thomas Greilinger; 30:30 – Petr Tatíček; 33:00 – John Laliberte; 39:53 – Jeffrey Szwez
No scoring		Third period	58:06 – Brandon Buck (PP2)
Tyler Beskorowany (33 saves / 38 shots)		Goalie stats	Timo Pielmeier (27 saves / 29 shots)

31 March	ERC Ingolstadt	3–2	OT	Düsseldorfer EG	Saturn Arena, Ingolstadt	Recap
No scoring		First period		14:25 – Shawn Belle
Brandon Buck (PP) – 28:41; Dustin Friesen (SH) – 32:14		Second period		No scoring
No scoring		Third period		41:27 – Travis Turnbull
Patrick Hager – 56:59		First overtime period		No scoring
Timo Pielmeier (34 saves / 36 shots)		Goalie stats		Tyler Beskorowany (39 saves / 42 shots)

2 April	Düsseldorfer EG	2–5	ERC Ingolstadt	ISS Dome, Düsseldorf	Recap
No scoring		First period	15:39 – Brandon Buck
Daniel Kreutzer (PP) – 34:29		Second period	30:53 – Brendan Brooks; 38:55 – Thomas Greilinger
Alexander Preibisch – 52:29		Third period	48:42 – Buck; 58:30 – Brooks (ENG)
Tyler Beskorowany (24 saves / 28 shots)		Goalie stats	Timo Pielmeier (30 saves / 32 shots)

4 April	ERC Ingolstadt	6–2	Düsseldorfer EG	Saturn Arena, Ingolstadt	Recap
John Laliberte – 11:14		First period	No scoring
Patrick Hager – 24:10; Jean-Francois Boucher (EA) – 28:38; Thomas Greilinger (PP) – 38:09		Second period	31:38 – Thomas Dolak
Hager (SH, ENG) – 47:27; Christoph Gawlik – 52:16		Third period	56:22 – Ken André Olimb
Timo Pielmeier (17 saves / 19 shots)		Goalie stats	Tyler Beskorowany (30 saves / 35 shots)

Ingolstadt won series 4–1

=== Finals ===
The finals will be played between 10 and 24 April 2015 in a best-of-seven mode.

10 April	Adler Mannheim	2–1	OT	ERC Ingolstadt	SAP Arena, Mannheim	Recap
No scoring		First period		No scoring
Christoph Ullmann – 28:18		Second period		28:00 – Petr Tatíček
No scoring		Third period		No scoring
Ronny Arendt – 64:46		First overtime period		No scoring
Dennis Endras (23 saves / 24 shots)		Goalie stats		Timo Pielmeier (43 saves / 45 shots)

12 April	ERC Ingolstadt	5–2	Adler Mannheim	Saturn Arena, Ingolstadt	Recap
No scoring		First period	No scoring
Brandon Buck (PP) – 20:25		Second period	No scoring
Buck – 45:35; Jared Ross – 48:29; Derek Hahn (PP) – 50:55; Petr Tatíček (ENG) – 59:40		Third period	46:34 – Ronny Arendt; 54:44 – Bobby Raymond (SH)
Timo Pielmeier (28 saves / 30 shots)		Goalie stats	Dennis Endras (18 saves / 22 shots)

14 April	Adler Mannheim	1–6	ERC Ingolstadt	SAP Arena, Mannheim	Recap
Kai Hospelt – 05:18		First period	03:30 – Michel Périard (PP)
No scoring		Second period	21:21 – Brendan Brooks; 25:09 – Aaron Brocklehurst; 38:14 – Jared Ross; 38:47 – John Laliberte
No scoring		Third period	43:44 – Brandon Buck (PP)
Dennis Endras (16 saves / 21 shots); Youri Ziffzer (7 saves / 8 shots)		Goalie stats	Timo Pielmeier (33 saves / 34 shots)

17 April	ERC Ingolstadt	2–6	Adler Mannheim	Saturn Arena, Ingolstadt	Recap
Alexandre Picard – 06:16		First period	03:37 – Martin Buchwieser; 09:17 – Kurtis Foster
Michel Périard (PP) – 27:12		Second period	24:34 – Bobby Raymond; 37:08 – Christoph Ullmann
No scoring		Third period	44:59 – Frank Mauer; 58:23 – Nikolai Goc (SH, ENG)
Timo Pielmeier (26 saves / 31 shots)		Goalie stats	Dennis Endras (16 saves / 18 shots)

19 April	Adler Mannheim	3–1	ERC Ingolstadt	SAP Arena, Mannheim	Recap
Jonathan Rheault – 13:07; Andrew Joudrey (EA) – 17:19		First period	No scoring
No scoring		Second period	21:06 – Ryan MacMurchy
Jamie Tardif (PP) – 47:30		Third period	No scoring
Dennis Endras (29 saves / 30 shots)		Goalie stats	Timo Pielmeier (20 saves / 23 shots)

22 April	ERC Ingolstadt	1–3	Adler Mannheim	Saturn Arena, Ingolstadt	Recap
No scoring		First period	No scoring
Christoph Gawlik – 28:02		Second period	31:40 – Kurtis Foster (PP)
No scoring		Third period	43:51 – Andrew Joudrey; 59:36 – Jonathan Rheault (ENG)
Timo Pielmeier (28 saves / 30 shots)		Goalie stats	Dennis Endras (26 saves / 27 shots)

Mannheim won series 4–2
