= 2014 Deutschland Cup =

Tournament details
- Host country: Germany
- Venue: 1 (in 1 host city)
- Dates: 7–9 November
- Teams: 4

Final positions
- Champions: Germany (6th title)
- Runners-up: Switzerland
- Third place: Slovakia
- Fourth place: Canada

Tournament statistics
- Games played: 6
- Goals scored: 24 (4 per game)
- Attendance: 30,200 (5,033 per game)

Official website
- Website

The 2014 Deutschland Cup was the 25th edition of the tournament.

== Teams ==
- Canada
- Germany
- Slovakia
- Switzerland

== Standings ==
Pos	Team	Pld	W	OTW	OTL	L	GF	GA	GD	Pts
1	Germany	3	2	0	0	1	7	6	+1	6
2	Switzerland	3	2	0	0	1	5	5	0	6
3	Slovakia	3	1	0	0	2	6	5	+1	3
4	Canada	3	1	0	0	2	6	8	−2	3

== Results ==
7 November 2014; 16:30	Canada	1–4 (0–1, 0–1, 1–2)	Slovakia	Olympiahalle, Munich; Attendance: 4,500

Game reference

Sébastien Caron
Goalies
Branislav Konrád
Referees:
(Germany) Simon Aicher
(Germany) Stefan Vogl
Linesmen:
(Germany) Marcus Höfer
(Germany) Lukas Kohlmüller

	0–1	15:20 – Mikúš (Dravecký) (PP)
	0–2	38:45 – Deyl (Dravecký)
DuPont (Reinprecht) (PP2) – 41:20	1–2
	1–3	41:48 – Lapšanský (Lušňák) (SH)
	1–4	52:09 – Rác (Lušňák)

8 min
Penalties
10 min
33
Shots
29

7 November 2014; 20:00	Germany	3–1 (1–0, 1–1, 1–0)	Switzerland	Olympiahalle, Munich; Attendance: 5,500

Game reference

Dennis Endras
Goalies
Daniel Manzato
Referees:
(Russia) Roman Gofman
(Germany) Marian Rohatsch
Linesmen:
(Germany) Gabriel Gaube
(Germany) Jonas Merten

Reimer (Gogulla, Ullmann) – 15:23	1–0
	1–1	25:26 – Suri (Martschini, Lemm) (PP)
Reimer (PP) – 28:22	2–1
Oppenheimer (Pietta, Hördler) (ENG) – 59:33	3–1

6 min
Penalties
10 min
36
Shots
21

8 November 2014; 16:15	Germany	2–1 (1–0, 1–0, 0–1)	Slovakia	Olympiahalle, Munich; Attendance: 5,700

Game reference

Timo Pielmeier
Goalies
Marek Čiliak
Referees:
(Russia) Roman Gofman
(Germany) Stefan Vogl
Linesmen:
(Germany) Lukas Kohlmüller
(Germany) Jan-Christian Müller

Hager (Reimer) – 01:39	1–0
Ullmann (Reimer, Gogulla) – 39:20	2–0
	2–1	55:37 – Lapšanský (Vandas)

8 min
Penalties
4 min
33
Shots
31

8 November 2014; 19:45	Switzerland	2–1 (1–0, 0–1, 1–0)	Canada	Olympiahalle, Munich; Attendance: 5,000

Game reference

Sandro Zurkirchen
Goalies
Chris Mason
Referees:
(Germany) Simon Aicher
(Germany) Bastian Haupt
Linesmen:
(Germany) Marcus Höfer
(Germany) Jonas Merten

Walser (Walsky, Kparghai) – 11:12	1–0
	1–1	34:32 – Hamill (Aulin, Reddox)
Wieser (ENG) – 59:12	2–1

14 min
Penalties
8 min
24
Shots
37

9 November 2014; 13:15	Slovakia	1–2 (0–0, 1–0, 0–2)	Switzerland	Olympiahalle, Munich; Attendance: 4,500

Game reference

Branislav Konrád
Goalies
Sandro Zurkirchen
Referees:
(Germany) Marian Rohatsch
(Germany) Stefan Vogl
Linesmen:
(Germany) Lukas Kohlmüller
(Germany) Jan-Christian Müller

Lapšanský (Sýkora, Cingeľ) – 35:39	1–0
	1–1	44:12 – Martschini (Haas, Suri)
	1–2	45:03 – Walser (Wieser, Simion)

4 min
Penalties
10 min
27
Shots
26

9 November 2014; 16:45	Canada	4–2 (0–2, 2–0, 2–0)	Germany	Olympiahalle, Munich; Attendance: 5,000

Game reference

Chris Mason
Goalies
Dennis Endras
Timo Pielmeier
Referees:
(Russia) Roman Gofman
(Germany) Bastian Haupt
Linesmen:
(Germany) Gabriel Gaube
(Germany) Marcus Höfer

	0–1	13:12 – Reul (Oppenheimer, Hospelt)
	0–2	17:19 – Hager (Wolf, Hördler) (PP2)
Clark (Holloway) – 35:22	1–2
Holloway (Reinprecht, Regehr) (PP) – 38:53	2–2
Reinprecht (Pettinger) (PP) – 53:51	3–2
Buck (Clark) (ENG) – 59:05	4–2

10 min
Penalties
14 min
27
Shots
27
