= Sinan Akdag =

German ice hockey player (born 1989)

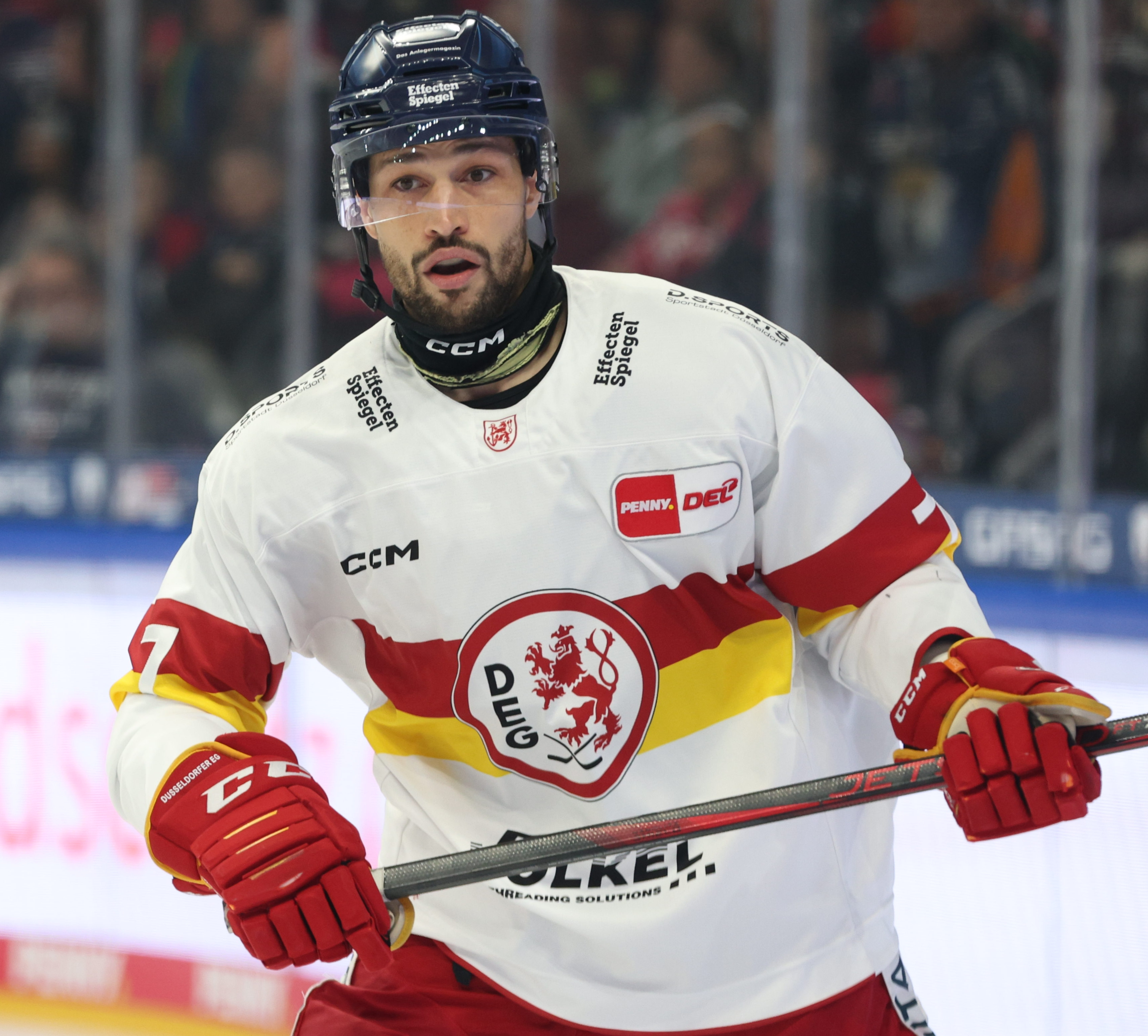
- Sinan Akdag, 2024
- Born: November 5, 1989 (age 35); Rosenheim, West Germany
- Height: 6 ft 2 in (188 cm)
- Weight: 203 lb (92 kg; 14 st 7 lb)
- Position: Defence
- Shoots: Left
- DEL team Former teams: Düsseldorfer EG; Krefeld Pinguine; Adler Mannheim
- National team: Germany
- Playing career: 2007–present

Sinan Akdag (born November 5, 1989) is a German professional ice hockey defenceman. He is currently playing for Düsseldorfer EG in the Deutsche Eishockey Liga (DEL).

== Playing career ==
A Rosenheim native, Akdag came through the youth ranks of the Starbulls Rosenheim. After joining the Krefeld Pinguine organization, he made his debut in Germany's top-flight Deutsche Eishockey Liga (DEL) during the 2007–08 campaign. Following a seven-year stint with the Krefeld team, he signed with fellow DEL side Adler Mannheim in 2014 and won the German championship in his first year with the team.

He received DEL Defenseman of the Year honors in the 2015–16 season.

Following nine seasons with Adler Mannheim, Akdag left the club as a free agent and was signed to a two-year contract to continue in the DEL with Düsseldorfer EG on 12 May 2023.

== International play ==
After representing Germany at the U17, U18 and U20 level, he made his debut on the men's national team in December 2011. Akdag was nominated to be part of Team Germany during the 2018 Olympic Games in Pyeongchang, South Korea.

== Career statistics ==
=== Regular season and playoffs ===
			Regular season					Playoffs
Season	Team	League	GP	G	A	Pts	PIM	GP	G	A	Pts	PIM
2004–05	Starbulls Rosenheim	DNL	34	0	8	8	8	2	0	0	0	2
2005–06	Starbulls Rosenheim	DNL	35	2	14	16	16	7	1	0	1	8
2005–06	Starbulls Rosenheim	3.GBun	12	0	0	0	6	—	—	—	—	—
2006–07	Starbulls Rosenheim	DNL	18	1	10	11	26	3	0	0	0	27
2006–07	Starbulls Rosenheim	3.GBun	36	0	3	3	10	—	—	—	—	—
2007–08	Krefeld Pinguine	DEL	43	0	0	0	6	—	—	—	—	—
2007–08	RT Bad Nauheim	3.GBun	4	0	2	2	0	—	—	—	—	—
2008–09	Krefeld Pinguine	DEL	43	1	8	9	30	7	0	1	1	4
2008–09	Landshut Cannibals	2.GBun	2	1	1	2	2	—	—	—	—	—
2009–10	Krefeld Pinguine	DEL	54	1	10	11	51	—	—	—	—	—
2009–10	Landshut Cannibals	2.GBun	1	0	1	1	0	—	—	—	—	—
2010–11	Krefeld Pinguine	DEL	51	1	8	9	40	8	2	0	2	18
2011–12	Krefeld Pinguine	DEL	52	2	10	12	30	—	—	—	—	—
2012–13	Krefeld Pinguine	DEL	52	1	13	14	57	9	0	2	2	12
2013–14	Krefeld Pinguine	DEL	46	5	10	15	34	5	0	1	1	2
2014–15	Adler Mannheim	DEL	46	11	17	28	28	15	2	6	8	12
2015–16	Adler Mannheim	DEL	52	7	27	34	88	3	1	0	1	2
2016–17	Adler Mannheim	DEL	51	5	17	22	14	7	0	0	0	2
2017–18	Adler Mannheim	DEL	51	5	20	25	49	10	0	6	6	2
2018–19	Adler Mannheim	DEL	52	3	24	27	36	12	0	2	2	16
2019–20	Adler Mannheim	DEL	52	2	10	12	10	—	—	—	—	—
2020–21	Adler Mannheim	DEL	26	5	6	11	24	6	1	3	4	6
2021–22	Adler Mannheim	DEL	50	5	12	17	34	9	0	3	3	6
2022–23	Adler Mannheim	DEL	51	5	6	11	24	12	0	0	0	4
2023–24	Düsseldorfer EG	DEL	52	2	15	17	22	—	—	—	—	—
2024–25	Düsseldorfer EG	DEL	52	4	7	11	22	—	—	—	—	—
DEL totals			876	65	220	285	599	103	6	24	30	86

Medal record

Representing Germany

Ice hockey

Olympic Games
Silver medal – second place	2018 Pyeongchang	

=== International ===
Year	Team	Event	Result	GP	G	A	Pts	PIM
2006	Germany	U17	10th	5	0	0	0	2
2007	Germany	WJC18	8th	6	0	2	2	29
2009	Germany	WJC	9th	6	0	1	1	0
2012	Germany	WC	12th	4	0	0	0	2
2014	Germany	WC	10th	7	0	1	1	2
2016	Germany	WC	7th	8	1	1	2	0
2016	Germany	OGQ	Q	3	0	1	1	2
2018	Germany	OG	2nd place, silver medalist(s)	2	0	0	0	0
Junior totals				17	0	3	3	31
Senior totals				24	1	3	4	6

== Awards and honours ==
Award	Year
DEL
Defenseman of the Year	2016
Champion (Adler Mannheim)	2019
