= Petr Tatíček =

Czech ice hockey player

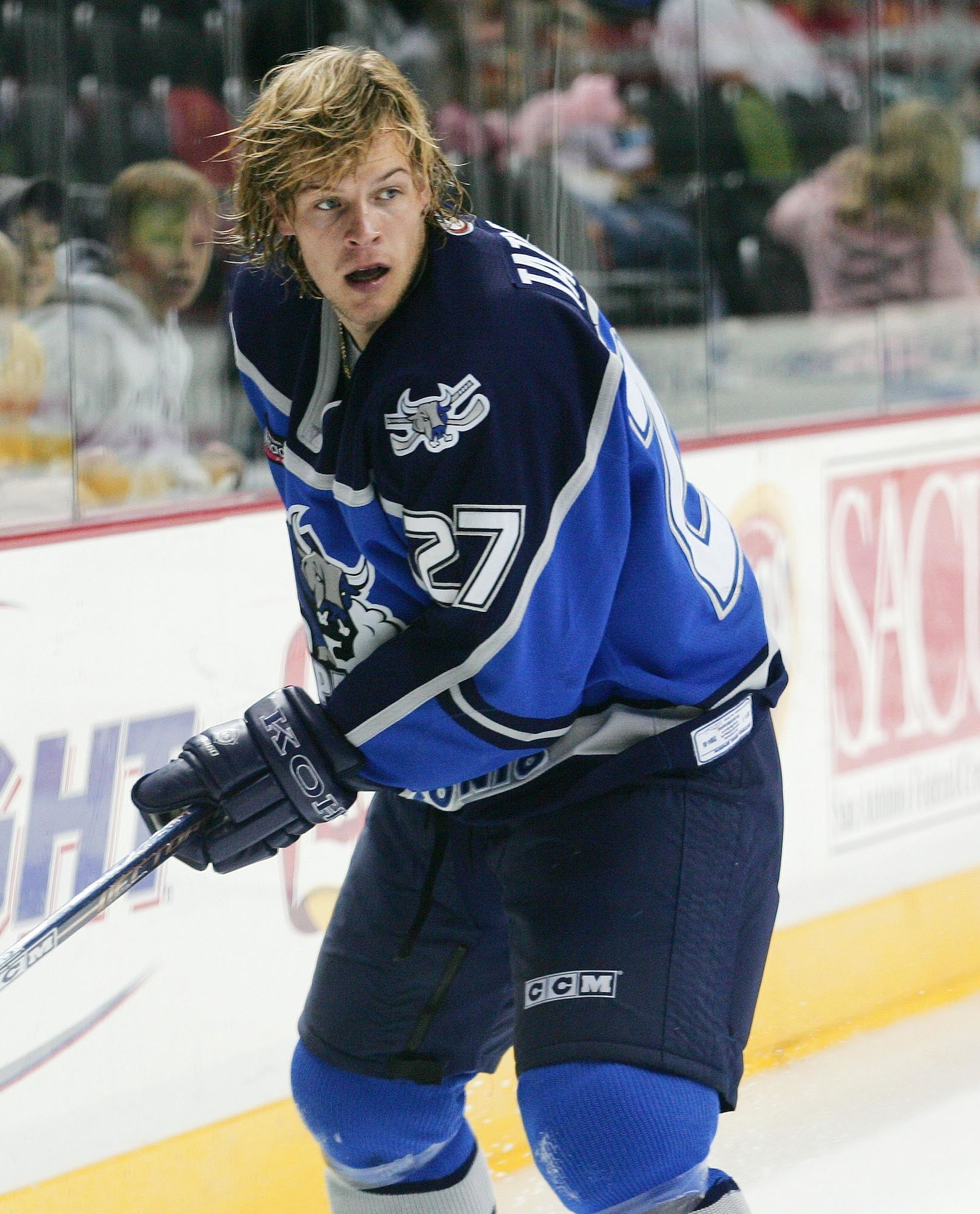
- Tatíček with the San Antonio Rampage in 2004
- Born: 22 September 1983 (age 42) Rakovník, Czechoslovakia
- Height: 6 ft 2 in (188 cm)
- Weight: 190 lb (86 kg; 13 st 8 lb)
- Position: Centre
- Shot: Left
- team Former teams: Free Agent; HC Kladno; Florida Panthers; HC Davos; HC Lev Praha; ERC Ingolstadt
- NHL draft: 9th overall, 2002; Florida Panthers
- Playing career: 2000–2020

Petr Tatíček (born 22 September 1983) is a Czech professional ice hockey centre who is currently an unrestricted free agent. He most recently played for ERC Ingolstadt of the Deutsche Eishockey Liga (DEL). He has previously played for the Florida Panthers of the National Hockey League (NHL).

== Playing career ==
Tatíček was drafted ninth overall by the Florida Panthers in the 2002 NHL entry draft from the Sault Ste. Marie Greyhounds of the Ontario Hockey League (OHL) and played just three games for the Panthers during the 2005–06 NHL season, going pointless. On 9 March 2006, Tatíček was traded to the Pittsburgh Penguins in exchange for Richard Jackman, but never played for them, spending the remainder of the season with their American Hockey League (AHL) affiliate, the Wilkes-Barre/Scranton Penguins.

Tatíček then signed with the Washington Capitals as a free agent, but only played one game for their AHL affiliate, the Hershey Bears, before returning to the Czech Extraliga with HC Kladno. Later in the season, he moved to HC Davos of the Swiss Nationalliga A.

On 22 July 2014, Tatíček signed as a one-year contract as a free agent with Deutsche Eishockey Liga (DEL) club ERC Ingolstadt. On 23 November 2014, during the 2014–15 season, and having quickly adapted to the DEL and among the team's top scoring line, Tatíček was signed to a three-year contract extension to remain in Ingolstadt.

== Career statistics ==
=== Regular season and playoffs ===
			Regular season					Playoffs
Season	Team	League	GP	G	A	Pts	PIM	GP	G	A	Pts	PIM
1998–99	HC Velvana Kladno	CZE U18	42	24	17	41		—	—	—	—	—
1999–2000	HC Velvana Kladno	CZE U20	44	8	16	24	22	—	—	—	—	—
1999–2000	HC Velvana Kladno	ELH	4	0	0	0	4	—	—	—	—	—
1999–2000	HC Velvana Kladno	CZE U18	—	—	—	—	—	4	3	0	3	4
2000–01	HC Vagnerplast Kladno	CZE U20	30	7	12	19	54	—	—	—	—	—
2000–01	HC Vagnerplast Kladno	ELH	3	0	0	0	0	—	—	—	—	—
2001–02	Sault Ste. Marie Greyhounds	OHL	60	21	42	63	32	6	3	3	6	4
2002–03	Sault Ste. Marie Greyhounds	OHL	54	12	45	57	44	4	1	0	1	0
2003–04	San Antonio Rampage	AHL	63	4	15	19	6	—	—	—	—	—
2004–05	San Antonio Rampage	AHL	67	7	15	22	21	—	—	—	—	—
2004–05	Laredo Bucks	CHL	4	2	5	7	0	—	—	—	—	—
2005–06	Houston Aeros	AHL	44	9	21	30	10	—	—	—	—	—
2005–06	Florida Panthers	NHL	3	0	0	0	0	—	—	—	—	—
2005–06	Wilkes–Barre/Scranton Penguins	AHL	17	4	4	8	7	1	0	0	0	2
2006–07	Hershey Bears	AHL	1	1	0	1	2	—	—	—	—	—
2006–07	HC Rabat Kladno	ELH	10	0	2	2	6	—	—	—	—	—
2006–07	HC Davos	NLA	15	4	1	5	8	17	3	4	7	10
2007–08	HC Davos	NLA	29	6	2	8	47	12	1	6	7	2
2008–09	HC Davos	NLA	50	6	15	21	20	21	4	5	9	12
2009–10	HC Davos	NLA	48	16	19	35	22	6	3	3	6	4
2010–11	HC Davos	NLA	38	14	17	31	60	14	4	8	12	4
2011–12	HC Davos	NLA	49	26	15	41	10	4	0	1	1	0
2012–13	HC Davos	NLA	21	5	5	10	20	5	0	2	2	2
2013–14	HC Lev Praha	KHL	8	1	1	2	8	—	—	—	—	—
2013–14	HC Davos	NLA	4	0	1	1	2	2	0	0	0	25
2014–15	ERC Ingolstadt	DEL	43	12	28	40	36	18	4	12	16	39
2015–16	ERC Ingolstadt	DEL	44	13	21	34	24	2	2	1	3	0
2016–17	ERC Ingolstadt	DEL	52	13	25	38	42	2	0	1	1	0
2017–18	ERC Ingolstadt	DEL	44	3	11	14	18	5	0	1	1	0
2018–19	ERC Ingolstadt	DEL	28	2	4	6	6	—	—	—	—	—
2019–20	ERC Ingolstadt	DEL	18	0	0	0	2	—	—	—	—	—
NHL totals			3	0	0	0	0	—	—	—	—	—
NLA totals			254	77	75	152	189	81	18	29	47	59
DEL totals			229	43	89	132	128	30	6	16	22	39

=== International ===
Year	Team	Event	Result	GP	G	A	Pts	PIM
2000	Czech Republic	U17	5th	5	2	2	4	0
2003	Czech Republic	WJC	6th	6	0	1	1	4
Junior totals				11	2	3	5	4

== Awards and honours ==
Award	Year
CHL
CHL Top Prospects Game	2002
NLA
Champion (HC Davos)	2007, 2009, 2011

Awards and achievements
Preceded by Jay Bouwmeester	Florida Panthers first-round draft pick 2002	Succeeded by Nathan Horton
