= Jeff Szwez =

Canadian-German ice hockey player

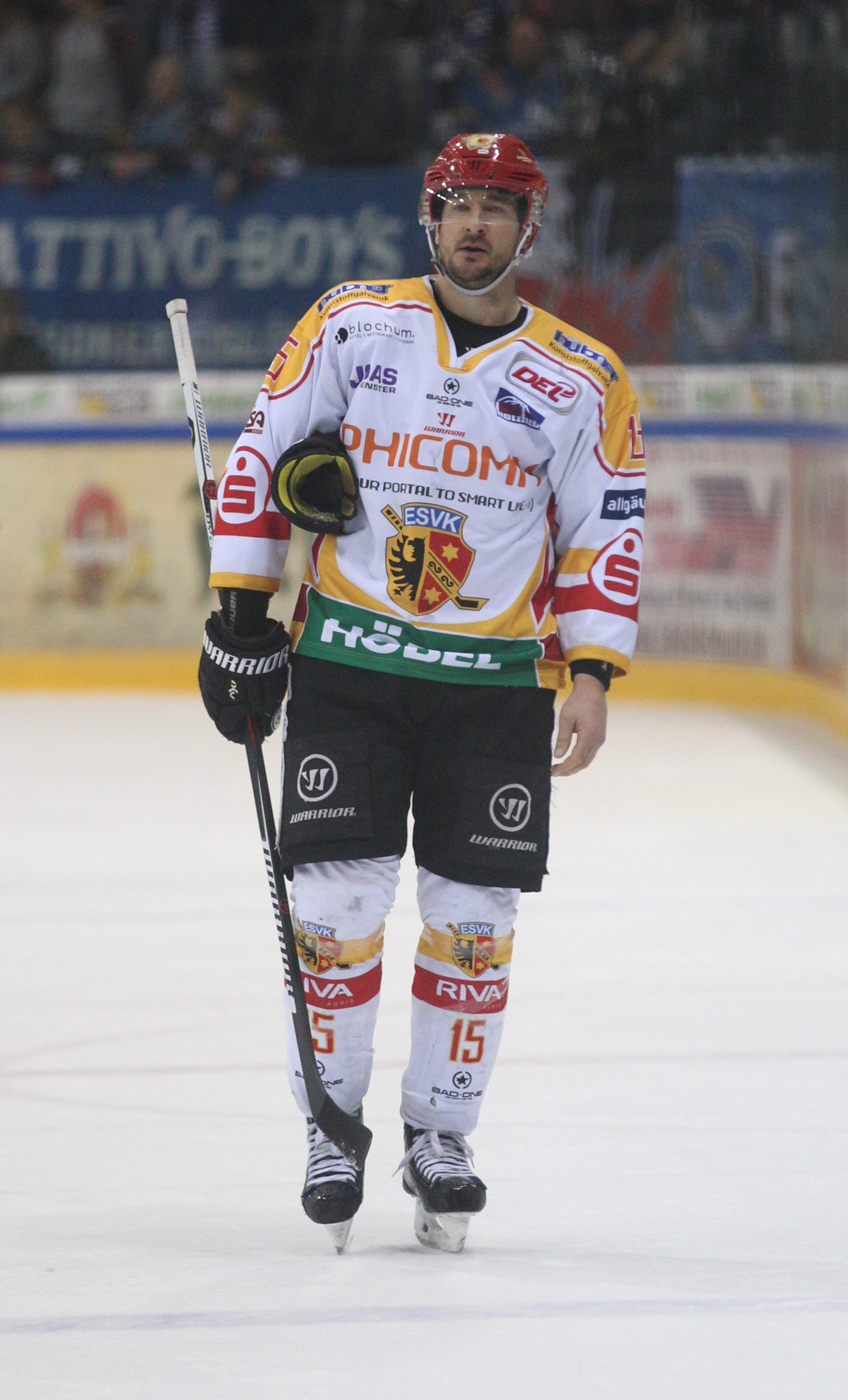
- Jeff Szwez
- Born: June 16, 1981 (age 44) Etobicoke, Ontario, Canada
- Height: 6 ft 3 in (191 cm)
- Weight: 210 lb (95 kg; 15 st 0 lb)
- Position: Right wing
- Shoots: Left
- team Former teams: Free Agent; Augusta Lynx; Binghamton Senators; Dayton Bombers; Pee Dee Pride; Bridgeport Sound Tigers; Syracuse Crunch; Espoo Blues; Philadelphia Phantoms; Belfast Giants; Augsburger Panther; Ravensburg Towerstars; EHC Freiburg; ERC Ingolstadt; Krefeld Pinguine; Dresdner Eislöwen; ESV Kaufbeuren
- NHL draft: Undrafted
- Playing career: 2002–present

Jeffrey Szwez (born June 16, 1981) is a Canadian-German professional ice hockey right winger who is currently an unrestricted free agent.

== Playing career ==
Szwez began his career playing for various minor league teams between 2002 and 2009, mainly in the ECHL. He played for the Augusta Lynx, Dayton Bombers, Florence Pride and the Pee Dee Pride. He also played in the American Hockey League for the Binghamton Senators, Bridgeport Sound Tigers, Syracuse Crunch and Philadelphia Phantoms. He also had ten game in the SM-liiga for the Espoo Blues during the 2007-08 SM-liiga season.

In 2009, Szwez signed for the Belfast Giants of the Elite Ice Hockey League and had a standout year, scoring 36 goals in 41 games as he helped the Giants win the Playoff Championship. He also made the league's All-Star Second team. He then moved to the Deutsche Eishockey Liga with the Augsburger Panther the following season, though the move ultimately did not work out for Szwez as he scored just 4 goals in 67 games over two seasons before moving to the Ravensburg Towerstars of the second-tier 2nd Bundesliga in January 2012 and later in the year, Szwez was playing in the third-tier Oberliga for EHC Freiburg.

On August 22, 2013, Szwez returned to the Belfast Giants for a second spell. He was able to recapture the same form he displayed in his previous spell, notching up 32 goals in 51 games and making the EIHL's All-Star Second Team once more. Szwez's second spell in Belfast would just end just like his first did, after one season and moving to the DEL, this time with ERC Ingolstadt. Szwez managed a relatively decent season with Ingolstadt, scoring 9 goals and 9 assists in 38 games, though he was not tendered a new contract and was released to free agency. On September 7, 2015, Szwez belatedly opted to remain in Germany, signing a contract with the Krefeld Pinguine of the DEL where he failed to score a single goal in 20 games and only notched up one assist. Szwez was released by Krefeld and he finished the season with Dresdner Eislöwen of DEL2. On October 13, 2016, Szwez signed for ESV Kaufbeuren of DEL2.

== Career statistics ==
			Regular season					Playoffs
Season	Team	League	GP	G	A	Pts	PIM	GP	G	A	Pts	PIM
2000–01	Streetsville Derbys	OPJHL	48	47	46	93	52	—	—	—	—	—
2001–02	Kitchener Rangers	OHL	65	22	35	57	59	4	1	0	1	8
2002–03	Augusta Lynx	ECHL	48	10	15	25	30	—	—	—	—	—
2002–03	Binghamton Senators	AHL	9	1	0	1	5	—	—	—	—	—
2003–04	Dayton Bombers	ECHL	3	0	0	0	4	—	—	—	—	—
2003–04	Florence Pride	ECHL	50	23	16	39	71	—	—	—	—	—
2004–05	Pee Dee Pride	ECHL	41	16	12	28	53	—	—	—	—	—
2004–05	Dayton Bombers	ECHL	23	12	8	20	20	—	—	—	—	—
2004–05	Bridgeport Sound Tigers	AHL	3	0	0	0	0	—	—	—	—	—
2005–06	Dayton Bombers	ECHL	51	25	22	47	90	—	—	—	—	—
2005–06	Syracuse Crunch	AHL	21	5	6	11	52	—	—	—	—	—
2006–07	Syracuse Crunch	AHL	47	12	11	23	106	—	—	—	—	—
2006–07	Dayton Bombers	ECHL	9	3	1	4	26	—	—	—	—	—
2007–08	Syracuse Crunch	AHL	33	4	6	10	59	—	—	—	—	—
2007–08	Espoo Blues	SM-l	10	2	3	5	25	5	0	0	0	2
2008–09	Philadelphia Phantoms	AHL	69	12	6	18	84	4	0	1	1	2
2009–10	Belfast Giants	EIHL	50	42	25	67	166	4	3	0	3	6
2010–11	Augsburger Panther	DEL	43	3	5	8	93	—	—	—	—	—
2011–12	Augsburger Panther	DEL	24	1	5	24	93	—	—	—	—	—
2011–12	Ravensburg Towerstars	2.GBun	17	5	7	12	22	11	5	4	9	28
2012–13	EHC Freiburg	GerObl	36	19	24	43	131	7	3	3	6	37
2013–14	Belfast Giants	EIHL	58	35	32	67	121	4	1	2	3	2
2014–15	ERC Ingolstadt	DEL	38	9	9	18	72	16	1	3	4	36
2015–16	Krefeld Pinguine	DEL	20	0	1	1	26	—	—	—	—	—
2015–16	Dresdner Eislöwen	DEL2	25	6	10	16	16	14	3	1	4	32
AHL totals			182	34	29	63	306	4	0	1	1	2

== Honours and awards ==
- 2007–08 SM-liiga Silver Medal
- 2009-10 EIHL All-Star Second Team
- 2009–10 EIHL Playoff Champion
- 2013–14 EIHL Champion
- 2013–14 EIHL Erhard Conference Champion
- 2013–14 EIHL All-Star Second Team
