= Tyler Beskorowany =

Canadian ice hockey player (born 1990)

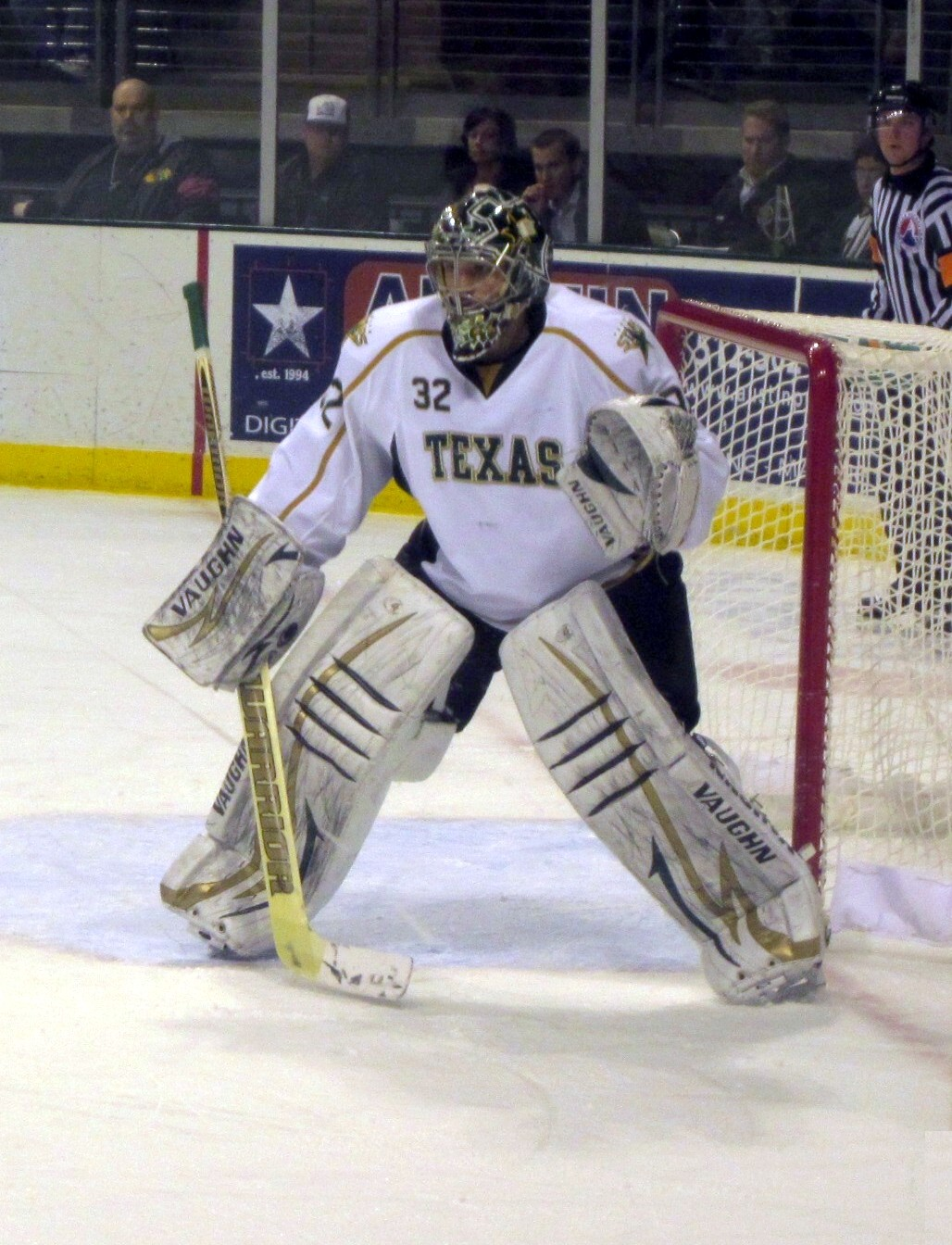
- Beskorowany with the Texas Stars in 2011
- Born: April 28, 1990 (age 36) Sudbury, Ontario, Canada
- Height: 6 ft 4 in (193 cm)
- Weight: 212 lb (96 kg; 15 st 2 lb)
- Position: Goaltender
- Caught: Left
- EIHL team Former teams: Belfast Giants; Düsseldorfer EG; Thomas Sabo Ice Tigers; Edinburgh Capitals; HC '05 Banská Bystrica; EC VSV
- NHL draft: 59th overall, 2008; Dallas Stars
- Playing career: 2010–2024

Tyler Beskorowany (born April 28, 1990) is a Canadian former professional ice hockey goaltender who last played for Belfast Giants of the Elite Ice Hockey League (EIHL). He was selected by the Dallas Stars in the second round (59th overall) of the 2008 NHL entry draft.

== Playing career ==
Prior to turning professional, Beskorowany played major junior hockey in the Ontario Hockey League (OHL) with the Owen Sound Attack and Kingston Frontenacs.

On September 17, 2009, Beskorowany was signed by the Dallas Stars to a three-year, entry-level contract. Throughout the duration of his contract, Beskorowany was assigned to American Hockey League (AHL) and ECHL affiliates, the Texas Stars and Idaho Steelheads.

At the completion of his contract with the Dallas Stars, Beskorowany was not tendered a qualifying offer and was released as a free agent. On July 24, 2013, he signed a one-year contract with ECHL club, the San Francisco Bulls. However, on January 27, 2014, the San Francisco Bulls announced they were ceasing operations effective immediately, leaving Beskorowany and all players on an ECHL contract with San Francisco as free agents.

He spent the 2014–15 season with Düsseldorfer EG of the German top-flight Deutsche Eishockey Liga (DEL) and was named DEL Goaltender of the Year.

On June 17, 2015, the Springfield Falcons announced they had signed Beskorowany to a one-year AHL deal. Beskorowany began the 2015–16 season with the Falcons before he was loaned to the ECHL with the Norfolk Admirals. Two months into his contract with the Falcons as their third choice goalkeeper, Beskorowany requested a release to return to Germany in agreeing to a deal for the remainder of the year with the Thomas Sabo Ice Tigers on December 2, 2015.

In December 2017, Beskorowany returned to ice hockey by signing with the Edinburgh Capitals of the Elite Ice Hockey League (EIHL). On June 1, 2018, Beskorowany moved to the Belfast Giants.

On June 3, 2019, Beskorowany moved to HC '05 Banská Bystrica.

On August 12, 2020, Beskorowany signed with ICE Hockey League (ICEHL) side EC VSV. However he departed the club in October 2020 after suffering an injury.

On June 30, 2021, it was announced that Beskorowany would return to the Belfast Giants for the 2021–22 season – two years after he first left the team.

After winning the EIHL title and Challenge Cup in the 2021–22 season, Beskorowany announced his retirement from ice hockey on July 26, 2022. However, on January 2, 2023, it was announced that he had re-signed with the Belfast Giants. On May 23, he was re-signed to a one-year contract with Belfast.

Tyler Beskorowany retired from professional hockey at the end of the 2023/2024 EIHL season.

== Awards and honours ==
| Award | Year | Ref |
|---|---|---|
| OHL All-Star Game | 2009–10 | |
| ECHL All-Star Game (replacement) | 2010–11 | |
| ECHL Goaltender of the Month (January) | 2010–11 | |
| DEL Goaltender of the Year | 2014–15 | |
| EIHL First Team All-Star | 2018–19, 2021–22 | |
| EIHL Goaltender of the Year | 2018–19, 2021–22 | |
