= Michael Davies (ice hockey) =

American professional ice hockey player

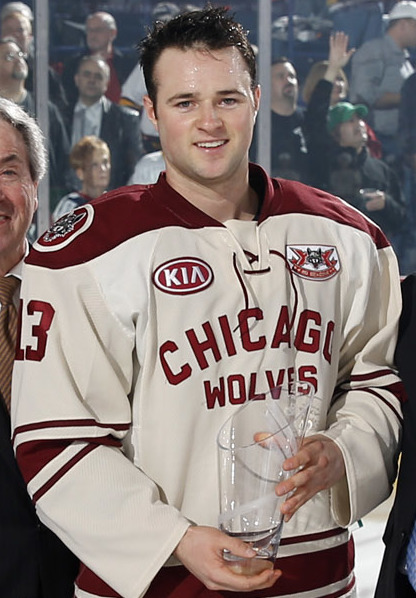
- Davies with the Chicago Wolves in 2014
- Born: December 10, 1986 (age 39) Chesterfield, Missouri, USA
- Height: 5 ft 9 in (175 cm)
- Weight: 178 lb (81 kg; 12 st 10 lb)
- Position: Right wing
- Shoots: Right
- Played for: Bridgeport Sound Tigers; Chicago Wolves; Düsseldorfer EG; Hamburg Freezers; Augsburger Panther; EHC Black Wings Linz; Sheffield Steelers; Kalamazoo Wings
- NHL draft: Undrafted
- Playing career: 2010–present

Michael Davies (born December 10, 1986) is an American professional ice hockey player. He played with UK EIHL side Sheffield Steelers, played for EHC Black Wings Linz of the Austrian Hockey League (EBEL), and most recently for the Kalamazoo Wings (ECHL).

== Playing career ==
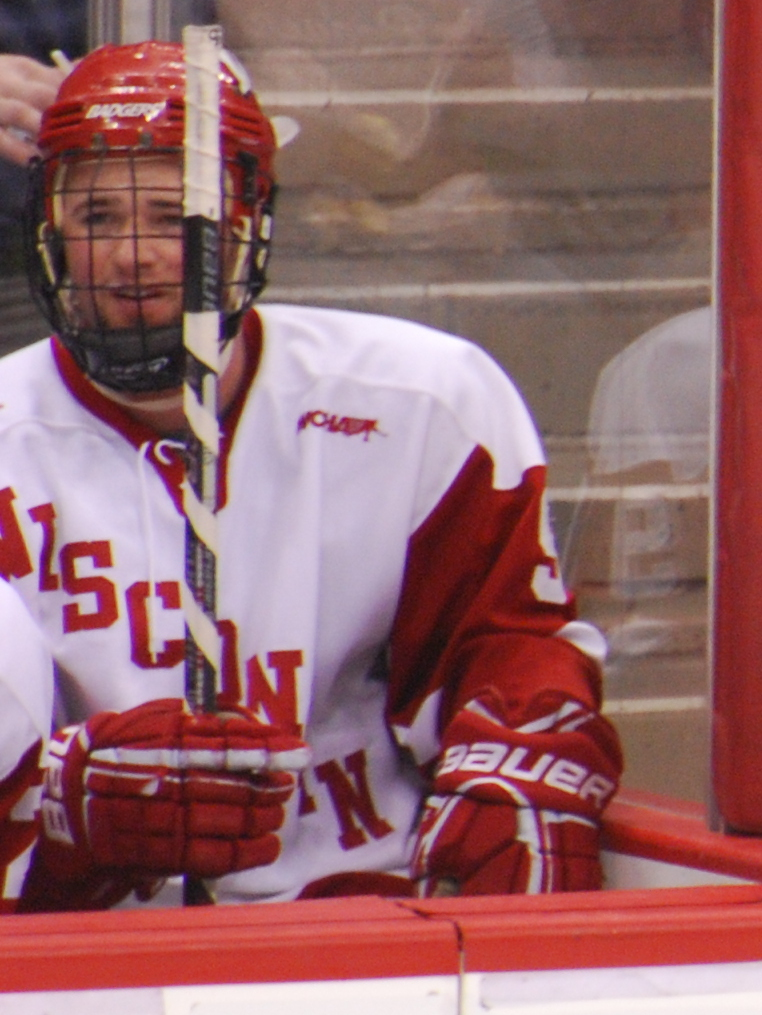
Davies playing with the Wisconsin Badgers in 2010

Prior to turning professional, Davies played for St. Louis Heartland Eagles of the USHL, the Springfield Jr. Blues of the NAHL where he won Rookie of the Year, and the Lincoln Stars of the USHL. Davies attended the University of Wisconsin–Madison where he played four seasons of college hockey with the NCAA Division I Wisconsin Badgers men's ice hockey team. He played professionally in the American Hockey League with the Bridgeport Sound Tigers and the Chicago Wolves.

On May 23, 2014, after 205 games played in the AHL, Davies signed his first contract abroad, agreeing to a one-year deal with Düsseldorfer EG of the German DEL. In the 2014–15 season, Davies was limited to 23 games due to injury, however performed at an elite level to contribute with 29 points.

On June 15, 2015, Davies opted to continue in the DEL, signing a one-year contract with the Hamburg Freezers. After one year with the Freezers, he moved on to fellow DEL side Augsburger Panther, signing a one-year deal in April 2016.

In the 2018–19 season, Davies moved to the neighbouring Austrian Hockey League (EBEL) signing a one-year contract with EHC Black Wings Linz. He contributed with 30 points through 39 games before leaving the club at the conclusion of their quarterfinal playoff defeat.

In June 2019, Davies moved to the UK to sign for EIHL side Sheffield Steelers.

== Career statistics ==
			Regular season					Playoffs
Season	Team	League	GP	G	A	Pts	PIM	GP	G	A	Pts	PIM
2003–04	St. Louis Heartland Eagles	USHL	2	0	0	0	2	—	—	—	—	—
2004–05	Springfield Jr. Blues	NAHL	56	30	27	57	67	—	—	—	—	—
2005–06	Lincoln Stars	USHL	51	28	43	71	48	9	4	3	7	10
2006–07	University of Wisconsin	WCHA	41	11	13	24	32	—	—	—	—	—
2007–08	University of Wisconsin	WCHA	39	13	11	24	40	—	—	—	—	—
2008–09	University of Wisconsin	WCHA	34	10	13	23	20	—	—	—	—	—
2009–10	University of Wisconsin	WCHA	41	20	32	52	30	—	—	—	—	—
2009–10	Bridgeport Sound Tigers	AHL	—	—	—	—	—	3	0	0	0	0
2010–11	Gwinnett Gladiators	ECHL	8	2	5	7	6	—	—	—	—	—
2010–11	Chicago Wolves	AHL	49	8	12	20	8	—	—	—	—	—
2011–12	Chicago Wolves	AHL	53	11	12	23	22	5	0	1	1	0
2012–13	Chicago Wolves	AHL	57	15	10	25	34	—	—	—	—	—
2012–13	Kalamazoo Wings	ECHL	2	1	0	1	0	—	—	—	—	—
2013–14	Chicago Wolves	AHL	46	13	18	31	10	9	1	3	4	2
2014–15	Düsseldorfer EG	DEL	23	8	21	29	16	12	3	4	7	4
2015–16	Hamburg Freezers	DEL	52	10	12	22	18	—	—	—	—	—
2016–17	Augsburger Panther	DEL	49	11	31	42	14	3	0	1	1	0
2017–18	Augsburger Panther	DEL	39	10	14	24	8	—	—	—	—	—
2018–19	EHC Black Wings Linz	EBEL	39	16	14	30	53	6	1	2	3	2
2019–20	Sheffield Steelers	EIHL	41	13	26	39	28	—	—	—	—	—
AHL totals			205	47	52	99	74	17	1	4	5	2

== Awards and honors ==
Award	Year
NAHL
Rookie of the Year	2004–05
College
WCHA Third All-Star Team	2009–10
