= Patrick Reimer =

German ice hockey player

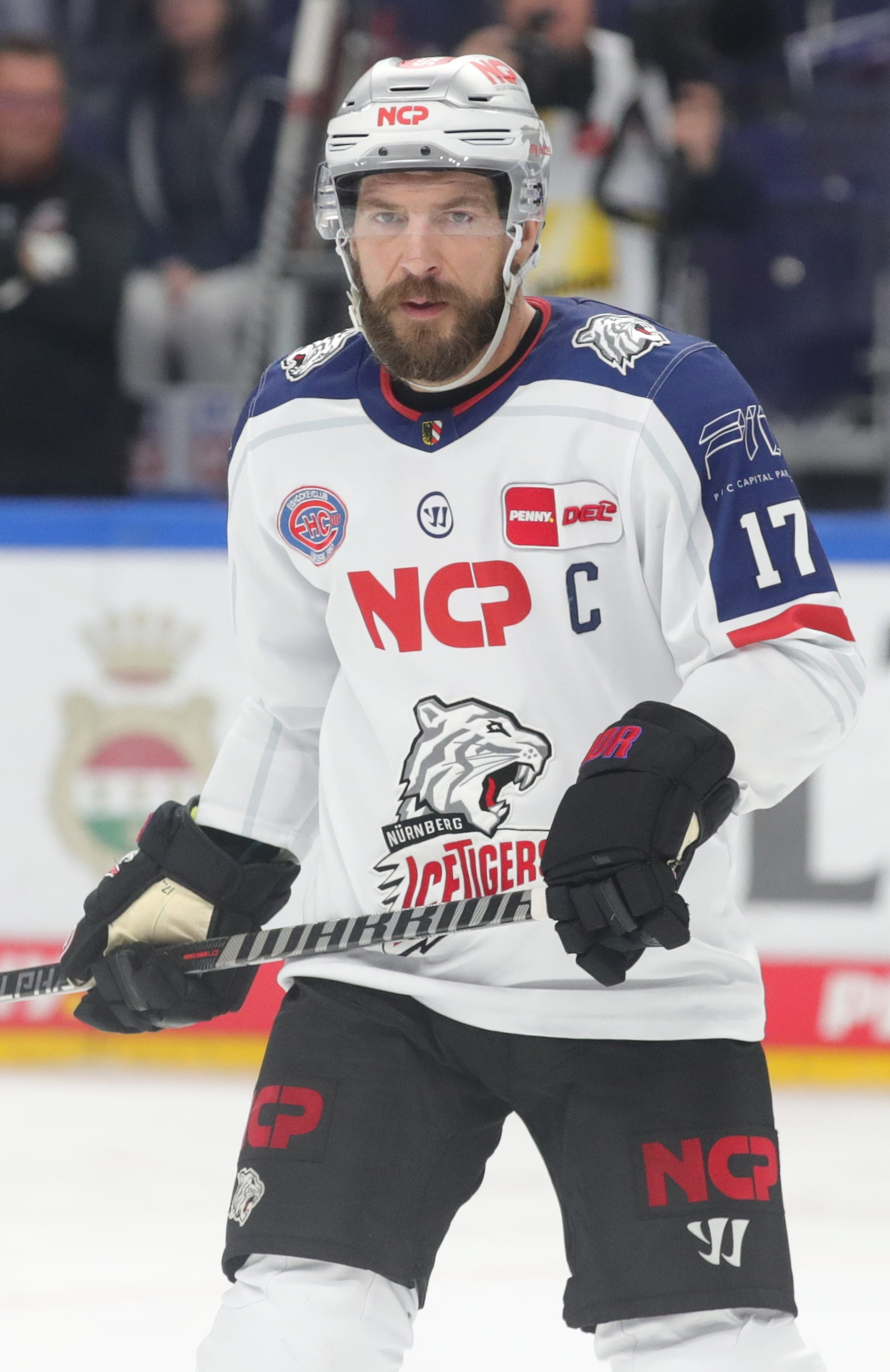
- Born: 10 December 1982 (age 42); Mindelheim, West Germany
- Height: 5 ft 10 in (178 cm)
- Weight: 190 lb (86 kg; 13 st 8 lb)
- Position: Right wing
- Shot: Right
- Played for: Düsseldorfer EG; Nürnberg Ice Tigers
- National team: Germany
- Playing career: 2001–2023

Patrick Reimer (born 10 December 1982) is a German former professional ice hockey forward who played for the DEG Metro Stars and Nürnberg Ice Tigers of the Deutsche Eishockey Liga (DEL).

== Playing career ==
Born in Mindelheim, Reimer and his younger brother Jochen started playing ice hockey at EV Bad Wörishofen, before joining the youth setup of ESV Kaufbeuren. He made his debut on Kaufbeuren's men's team in Germany's third division during the 2001-02 season and played his first game in Germany's top-flight Deutsche Eishockey Liga (DEL) for Düsseldorfer EG during the 2003-04 season. In his first full season with DEG in 2004–05, Reimer was selected as the DEL's Rookie of the Year. During his nine-year tenure at the club, he established himself as one of the best domestic players of the German league.

On 26 January 2012, Reimer agreed to leave Düsseldorfer EG at the season's end to join fellow DEL team Nürnberg Ice Tigers on a three-year contract. In January 2014, he penned a contract extension until 2017. He received DEL Player of the Year honors in 2014, 2016 and 2017.

On 15 January 2016, he scored his 263rd DEL goal, making him the all-time career goal-scoring leader in DEL. On 24 February 2017, he scored his 300th DEL goal. He is the first player to reach this historic mark.

During the 2022–23 season, Reimer announced his retirement at the conclusion of his 20th DEL year. He posted 42 points in 47 regular season games before ending his career in the pre-playoff round against the Fischtown Pinguins. He completed his career finishing as the DEL's all-time leading goal and points scorer with 349 goals, 419 assists for 768 points in 932 regular season games and adding 90 points in 135 playoff games. It was announced his jersey would be retired by the Ice Tigers in the following season.

== International play ==
Medal record

Representing Germany

Ice hockey

Olympic Games
Silver medal – second place	2018 Pyeongchang	

Reimer made his debut on the German national team in 2005. On 21 February 2018, Reimer scored the overtime game-winning goal to defeat Sweden in the quarter-finals of the 2018 Winter Olympics in Pyeongchang, before capturing silver with Germany. After 105 caps for Germany (29 goals, 27 assists) and participating in five World Championships and the 2018 Winter Olympics, Reimer announced the end of his internationals career in April 2018.

== Career statistics ==
=== Regular season and playoffs ===
			Regular season					Playoffs
Season	Team	League	GP	G	A	Pts	PIM	GP	G	A	Pts	PIM
1999–2000	ESV Kaufbeuren	GER U20	23	8	6	14	12	—	—	—	—	—
2000–01	ESV Kaufbeuren	GER U20	26	28	10	38	47	—	—	—	—	—
2001–02	ESV Kaufbeuren	GER U20	2	1	0	1	6	—	—	—	—	—
2001–02	ESV Kaufbeuren	GER.3	51	14	12	26	36	12	5	3	8	18
2002–03	ESV Kaufbeuren	GER U20	1	0	3	3	12	—	—	—	—	—
2002–03	ESV Kaufbeuren	GER.2	51	18	19	37	30	—	—	—	—	—
2003–04	ESV Kaufbeuren	GER.2	48	20	21	41	89	—	—	—	—	—
2003–04	DEG Metro Stars	DEL	1	0	0	0	0	—	—	—	—	—
2004–05	DEG Metro Stars	DEL	52	10	12	22	24	—	—	—	—	—
2004–05	Füchse Duisburg	GER.2	—	—	—	—	—	11	6	4	10	14
2005–06	DEG Metro Stars	DEL	49	10	12	22	20	14	3	7	10	18
2006–07	DEG Metro Stars	DEL	52	12	17	29	24	9	3	7	10	14
2007–08	DEG Metro Stars	DEL	45	19	14	33	28	13	7	2	9	12
2008–09	DEG Metro Stars	DEL	51	15	25	40	42	16	4	5	9	16
2009–10	DEG Metro Stars	DEL	56	20	23	43	52	2	0	0	0	0
2010–11	DEG Metro Stars	DEL	52	21	22	43	38	9	3	2	5	6
2011–12	DEG Metro Stars	DEL	50	24	23	47	55	7	5	3	8	2
2012–13	Thomas Sabo Ice Tigers	DEL	52	21	24	45	46	3	0	0	0	2
2013–14	Thomas Sabo Ice Tigers	DEL	50	33	32	65	18	6	3	1	4	4
2014–15	Thomas Sabo Ice Tigers	DEL	52	29	33	62	44	8	2	3	5	0
2015–16	Thomas Sabo Ice Tigers	DEL	52	26	38	64	53	12	4	3	7	35
2016–17	Thomas Sabo Ice Tigers	DEL	52	26	28	54	18	13	5	3	8	10
2017–18	Thomas Sabo Ice Tigers	DEL	43	13	18	31	16	12	0	5	5	2
2018–19	Thomas Sabo Ice Tigers	DEL	52	17	18	35	22	8	5	1	6	2
2019–20	Thomas Sabo Ice Tigers	DEL	47	17	22	39	16	—	—	—	—	—
2020–21	Nürnberg Ice Tigers	DEL	35	7	9	16	14	—	—	—	—	—
2020–21	ESV Kaufbeuren	GER.2	3	1	4	5	0	—	—	—	—	—
2021–22	Nürnberg Ice Tigers	DEL	42	15	21	36	18	3	1	1	2	4
2022–23	Nürnberg Ice Tigers	DEL	47	14	28	42	20	2	0	1	1	0
DEL totals			932	349	419	768	568	137	45	45	90	127

=== International ===
Year	Team	Event	Result	GP	G	A	Pts	PIM
2011	Germany	WC	7th	7	2	1	3	4
2012	Germany	WC	12th	7	3	2	5	2
2013	Germany	OGQ	DNQ	2	1	0	1	0
2015	Germany	WC	10th	7	2	1	3	0
2016	Germany	WC	7th	8	4	1	5	2
2016	Germany	OGQ	Q	3	1	2	3	0
2017	Germany	WC	8th	8	2	2	4	4
2018	Germany	OG	2nd place, silver medalist(s)	5	1	0	1	2
Senior totals				47	16	9	25	14
