= Andrew Joudrey =

Canadian ice hockey player (born 1984)

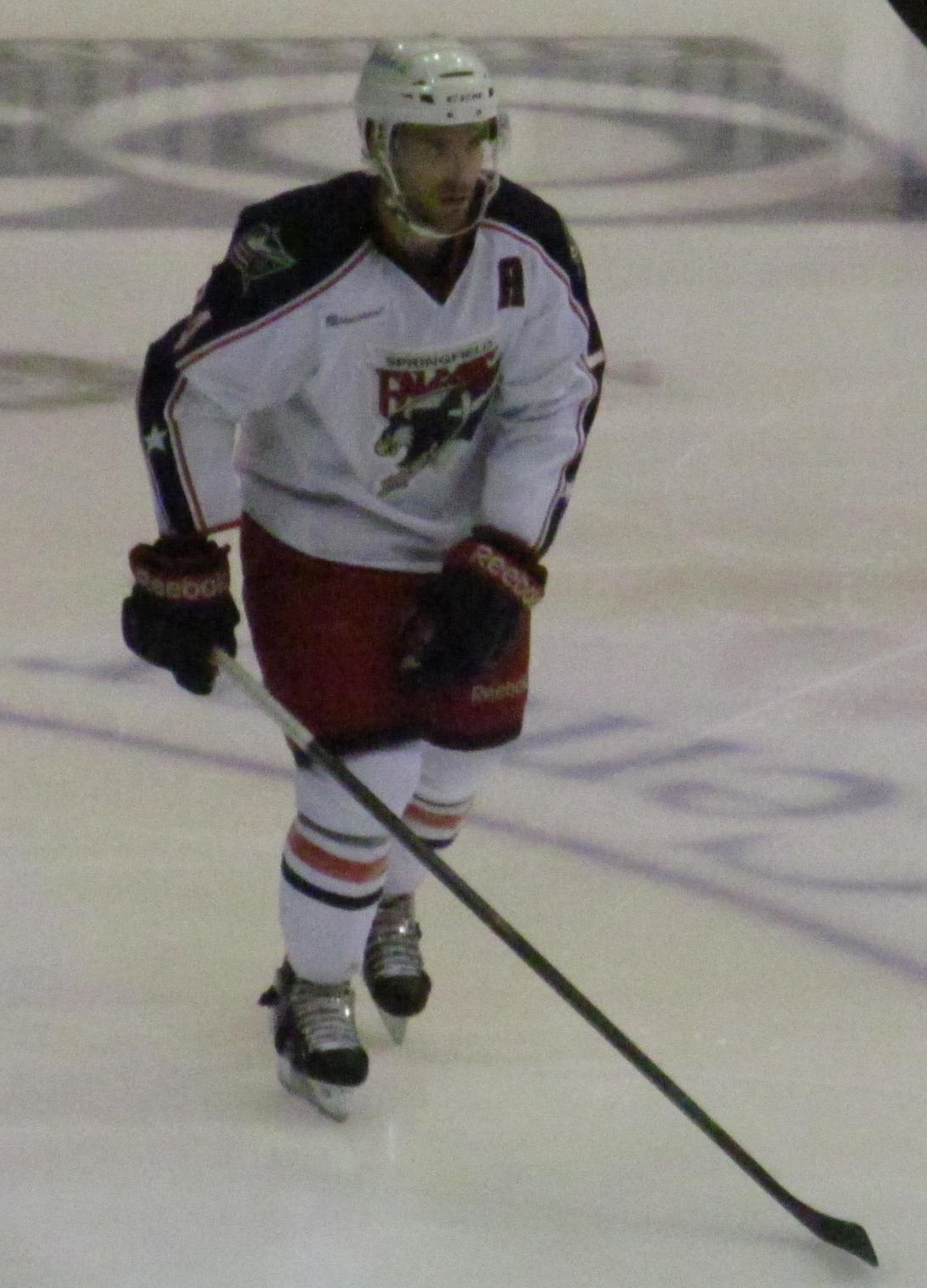
- Born: July 15, 1984 (age 42) Bedford, Nova Scotia, Canada
- Height: 5 ft 10 in (178 cm)
- Weight: 185 lb (84 kg; 13 st 3 lb)
- Position: Centre
- Shot: Left
- Played for: Columbus Blue Jackets; Adler Mannheim
- NHL draft: 249th overall, 2003; Washington Capitals
- Playing career: 2007–2017

Andrew David Joudrey (born July 15, 1984) is a former Canadian professional ice hockey forward who most recently played for the Adler Mannheim in the Deutsche Eishockey Liga (DEL). Joudrey was selected by the Washington Capitals in the 8th round (249th overall) of the 2003 NHL entry draft.

== Playing career ==
As a youth, Joudrey played in the 1997 and 1998 Quebec International Pee-Wee Hockey Tournaments with a minor ice hockey team from Bedford, Nova Scotia.

Joudrey twice won the AHL's Calder Cup while playing with the Hershey Bears, an affiliate of the Capitals. For his final season on the Bears, he was named team captain.

On July 1, 2011, the free-agent Joudrey signed a two-year, two-way contract with the Columbus Blue Jackets. Upon completion of his contract, Joudrey opted to remain with the Blue Jackets affiliate, the Springfield Falcons, re-signing to a one-year AHL contract on July 23, 2013.

After three seasons primarily with the Falcons, Joudrey signed his first contract abroad, agreeing to a one-year deal with German club, Adler Mannheim of the DEL on June 19, 2014. In the 2014–15 season, Joudrey made a seamless transition to European hockey helping lead the club as an Alternate Captain to capture the DEL Championship with 29 points in 52 games. He was signed to a two-year contract extension on April 29, 2015.

On July 28, 2017, Joudrey announced his retirement from professional hockey and was named President of the Madison Capitols of the United States Hockey League.

== Career statistics ==
| | | | Regular season | | | | | Playoffs |
| Season | Team | League | GP | G | A | Pts | PIM | GP | G | A | Pts | PIM |
|---|---|---|---|---|---|---|---|---|---|---|---|---|
| 2000–01 | Dartmouth Subways AAA | Midget | 82 | 51 | 70 | 121 | — | — | — | — | — | — |
| 2001–02 | Notre Dame Hounds | SJHL | 57 | 24 | 38 | 62 | 14 | — | — | — | — | — |
| 2002–03 | Notre Dame Hounds | SJHL | 53 | 27 | 51 | 78 | 16 | — | — | — | — | — |
| 2003–04 | University of Wisconsin | WCHA | 42 | 7 | 15 | 22 | 2 | — | — | — | — | — |
| 2004–05 | University of Wisconsin | WCHA | 41 | 7 | 17 | 24 | 18 | — | — | — | — | — |
| 2005–06 | University of Wisconsin | WCHA | 37 | 8 | 10 | 18 | 14 | — | — | — | — | — |
| 2006–07 | University of Wisconsin | WCHA | 40 | 9 | 20 | 29 | 18 | — | — | — | — | — |
| 2006–07 | Hershey Bears | AHL | 5 | 2 | 1 | 3 | 0 | 10 | 0 | 2 | 2 | 0 |
| 2007–08 | Hershey Bears | AHL | 61 | 11 | 14 | 25 | 22 | 5 | 0 | 1 | 1 | 0 |
| 2008–09 | Hershey Bears | AHL | 69 | 7 | 20 | 27 | 22 | 22 | 1 | 3 | 4 | 6 |
| 2009–10 | Hershey Bears | AHL | 78 | 15 | 19 | 34 | 11 | 21 | 1 | 2 | 3 | 4 |
| 2010–11 | Hershey Bears | AHL | 66 | 7 | 7 | 14 | 20 | 6 | 0 | 1 | 1 | 0 |
| 2011–12 | Springfield Falcons | AHL | 73 | 14 | 11 | 25 | 18 | — | — | — | — | — |
| 2011–12 | Columbus Blue Jackets | NHL | 1 | 0 | 0 | 0 | 0 | — | — | — | — | — |
| 2012–13 | Springfield Falcons | AHL | 73 | 9 | 13 | 22 | 26 | 6 | 1 | 2 | 3 | 2 |
| 2013–14 | Springfield Falcons | AHL | 67 | 12 | 20 | 32 | 38 | 2 | 1 | 1 | 2 | 0 |
| 2014–15 | Adler Mannheim | DEL | 52 | 11 | 18 | 29 | 22 | 15 | 5 | 3 | 8 | 18 |
| 2015–16 | Adler Mannheim | DEL | 48 | 7 | 7 | 14 | 18 | 3 | 0 | 0 | 0 | 4 |
| 2016–17 | Adler Mannheim | DEL | 52 | 5 | 5 | 10 | 43 | 7 | 0 | 1 | 1 | 2 |
| AHL totals | | | 491 | 76 | 105 | 181 | 157 | 72 | 4 | 12 | 16 | 12 |
| NHL totals | | | 1 | 0 | 0 | 0 | 0 | — | — | — | — | — |
| DEL totals | | | 152 | 23 | 30 | 53 | 83 | 25 | 5 | 4 | 9 | 24 |
