= Brandon Buck =

Canadian ice hockey player (born 1988)

- Born: August 16, 1988 (age 37) Delaware, Ontario, Canada
- Height: 6 ft 1 in (185 cm)
- Weight: 191 lb (87 kg; 13 st 9 lb)
- Position: Left wing
- Played for: Norfolk Admirals; Houston Aeros; Sparta Warriors; KHL Medveščak Zagreb; EHC Basel; ERC Ingolstadt; HC Davos; Vienna Capitals; Thomas Sabo Ice Tigers
- NHL draft: Undrafted
- Playing career: 2009–2020

Brandon Buck (born August 16, 1988) is a Canadian former professional ice hockey Forward player who is currently retired. He most recently played under contract for the then Thomas Sabo Ice Tigers of the Deutsche Eishockey Liga (DEL).

== Playing career ==
Undrafted, Buck played major junior hockey with the Guelph Storm of the Ontario Hockey League.

On June 14, 2011 Buck left North America and pursued a European career, signing for Norwegian club, Sparta Warriors of the GET-ligaen. He previously played in the American Hockey League with the Norfolk Admirals and the Houston Aeros.

As a free agent on July 6, 2012, Buck signed for Croatian team, KHL Medveščak Zagreb, who competed in their last season in Austrian Hockey League that season. After the season in Austria on April 19, 2013, Buck and his teammate, Kyle Greentree from KHL Medveščak, moved to the Swiss National League B with EHC Basel.

On July 18, 2014, Buck continued his journeyman European career, moving to the German DEL, in signing a contract with ERC Ingolstadt. In the 2014–15 season, Buck scored an impressive 28 goals and 59 points in 51 games. He led the club again offensively in the playoffs, scoring 20 points in 18 games in a defeat in the Championship final. After initially signing a two-year extension earlier in the season, Buck's importance to the club was signalled after he was signed to a further contract to remain in Ingolstadt through to the 2020 season on August 8, 2015. He amassed a total of 186 points (79 goals, 107 assists) in 183 appearances for ERC before leaving the team in December 2017 to move to HC Davos of the Swiss National League. In February 2018, Buck parted ways with Davos and signed with the Vienna Capitals of the Austrian Hockey League (EBEL).

On April 22, 2018, Buck returned to the DEL as a free agent, securing an optional three-year deal with the Thomas Sabo Ice Tigers.

== International play ==
Brandon Buck has played several times for the Canadian national team. He played for Team Canada in the Deutschland Cup 2014 & 2016, he also participated in the scouting tournaments of Team Canada's olympic preparation.

== Career statistics ==
			Regular season					Playoffs
Season	Team	League	GP	G	A	Pts	PIM	GP	G	A	Pts	PIM
2006–07	Guelph Storm	OHL	67	3	9	12	52	3	0	0	0	2
2007–08	Guelph Storm	OHL	59	29	31	60	40	10	5	3	8	11
2008–09	Guelph Storm	OHL	66	24	40	64	30	4	3	2	5	0
2008–09	Norfolk Admirals	AHL	6	1	1	2	4	—	—	—	—	—
2009–10	Florida Everblades	ECHL	47	18	21	39	22	9	2	2	4	4
2009–10	Houston Aeros	AHL	21	0	3	3	4	—	—	—	—	—
2010–11	Houston Aeros	AHL	56	3	13	16	8	—	—	—	—	—
2011–12	Sparta Warriors	GET	45	16	26	42	26	7	3	3	6	2
2012–13	KHL Medvescak Zagreb	EBEL	54	24	29	53	36	4	1	4	5	0
2013–14	EHC Basel	NLB	38	15	33	48	32	4	4	1	5	4
2014–15	ERC Ingolstadt	DEL	51	28	31	59	6	18	10	10	20	8
2015–16	ERC Ingolstadt	DEL	41	20	28	48	26	—	—	—	—	—
2016–17	ERC Ingolstadt	DEL	45	13	31	44	30	2	1	1	2	6
2017–18	ERC Ingolstadt	DEL	26	7	6	13	10	—	—	—	—	—
2017–18	HC Davos	NL	11	2	1	3	4	—	—	—	—	—
2017–18	Vienna Capitals	EBEL	6	2	1	3	6	11	2	4	6	14
2018–19	Thomas Sabo Ice Tigers	DEL	44	16	13	29	14	8	0	3	3	4
2019–20	Thomas Sabo Ice Tigers	DEL	51	19	18	37	34	—	—	—	—	—
AHL totals			83	4	17	21	16	—	—	—	—	—
