= Daniel Pietta =

German ice hockey player (born 1986)

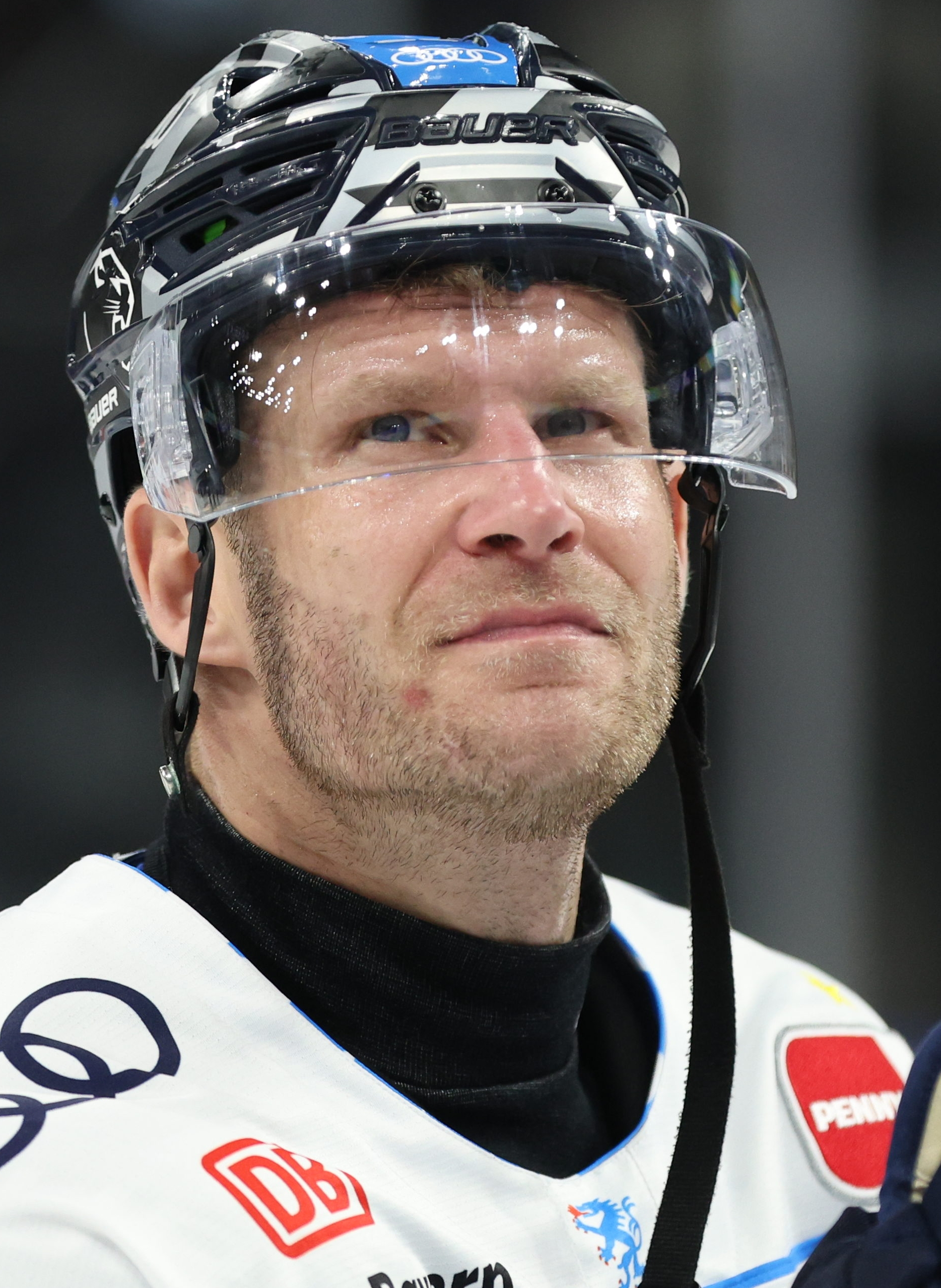
- Pietta in 2024
- Born: 9 December 1986 (age 39) Krefeld, West Germany
- Height: 6 ft 0 in (183 cm)
- Weight: 207 lb (94 kg; 14 st 11 lb)
- Position: Left wing
- Shoots: Left
- DEL team Former teams: ERC Ingolstadt; Krefeld Pinguine; Leksands IF
- National team: Germany
- Playing career: 2004–present

Daniel Pietta (born 9 December 1986) is a German professional ice hockey forward. He currently plays with ERC Ingolstadt in the Deutsche Eishockey Liga (DEL). He previously played with Krefeld Pinguine from 2003 to 2020.

== Playing career ==
After 17 seasons in the DEL playing exclusively with Krefeld Pinguine, Pietta left his hometown club to embark on a new challenge in signing a one-year contract with ERC Ingolstadt on 17 November 2020.

== International career ==
He most recently represented Germany at the 2018 IIHF World Championship.

== Career statistics ==
=== Regular season and playoffs ===
			Regular season					Playoffs
Season	Team	League	GP	G	A	Pts	PIM	GP	G	A	Pts	PIM
2001–02	Krefeld Pinguine	DNL	40	25	37	62	74	2	0	3	3	14
2002–03	Krefeld Pinguine	DNL	33	22	33	55	92	2	0	0	0	4
2003–04	Krefeld Pinguine	DNL	28	27	34	61	110	2	0	0	0	34
2003–04	Krefeld Pinguine	DEL	5	0	0	0	0	—	—	—	—	—
2003–04	Grefrather EC	GER.4	1	0	0	0	4	—	—	—	—	—
2004–05	Krefeld Pinguine	DEL	6	0	0	0	2	—	—	—	—	—
2004–05	Füchse Duisburg	GER.2	46	9	10	19	75	12	1	4	5	6
2005–06	Krefeld Pinguine	DEL	47	3	3	6	18	5	0	0	0	2
2006–07	Krefeld Pinguine	DEL	51	5	13	18	18	2	0	0	0	0
2007–08	Krefeld Pinguine	DEL	56	11	21	32	50	—	—	—	—	—
2008–09	Krefeld Pinguine	DEL	52	13	10	23	32	7	3	2	5	12
2009–10	Krefeld Pinguine	DEL	52	16	37	53	66	—	—	—	—	—
2010–11	Krefeld Pinguine	DEL	50	16	26	42	90	8	1	3	4	4
2011–12	Krefeld Pinguine	DEL	52	17	30	47	50	—	—	—	—	—
2012–13	Krefeld Pinguine	DEL	45	13	25	38	32	9	2	8	10	26
2013–14	Krefeld Pinguine	DEL	41	16	32	48	59	5	0	3	3	4
2014–15	Krefeld Pinguine	DEL	52	17	42	59	38	3	2	1	3	4
2015–16	Krefeld Pinguine	DEL	47	15	37	52	22	—	—	—	—	—
2016–17	Krefeld Pinguine	DEL	51	14	30	44	96	—	—	—	—	—
2017–18	Krefeld Pinguine	DEL	43	12	30	42	6	—	—	—	—	—
2017–18	Leksands IF	Allsv	8	3	5	8	4	9	2	5	7	10
2018–19	Krefeld Pinguine	DEL	52	15	38	53	24	—	—	—	—	—
2019–20	Krefeld Pinguine	DEL	51	18	31	49	28	—	—	—	—	—
2020–21	ERC Ingolstadt	DEL	30	5	14	19	28	3	0	2	2	4
2021–22	ERC Ingolstadt	DEL	50	11	29	40	36	2	0	1	1	0
2022–23	ERC Ingolstadt	DEL	51	13	22	35	14	16	2	10	12	16
2023–24	ERC Ingolstadt	DEL	51	7	28	35	22	7	0	2	2	6
2024–25	ERC Ingolstadt	DEL	49	13	18	31	12	12	1	2	3	6
DEL totals			984	250	516	766	743	79	11	34	45	84

=== International ===
Year	Team	Event	Result	GP	G	A	Pts	PIM
2003	Germany	WJC18 D1	13th	5	3	1	4	0
2004	Germany	WJC18 D1	11th	5	8	3	11	6
2006	Germany	WJC D1	11th	5	0	0	0	4
2012	Germany	WC	12th	4	0	0	0	0
2013	Germany	OGQ	NQ	3	0	0	0	2
2013	Germany	WC	9th	5	0	0	0	0
2014	Germany	WC	14th	7	0	0	0	0
2015	Germany	WC	10th	7	1	1	2	2
2018	Germany	WC	11th	7	0	0	0	2
2022	Germany	OG	10th	2	0	0	0	0
Junior totals				15	11	4	15	10
Senior totals				35	1	1	2	6
