= Daniel Sparre =

Canadian-German ice hockey player

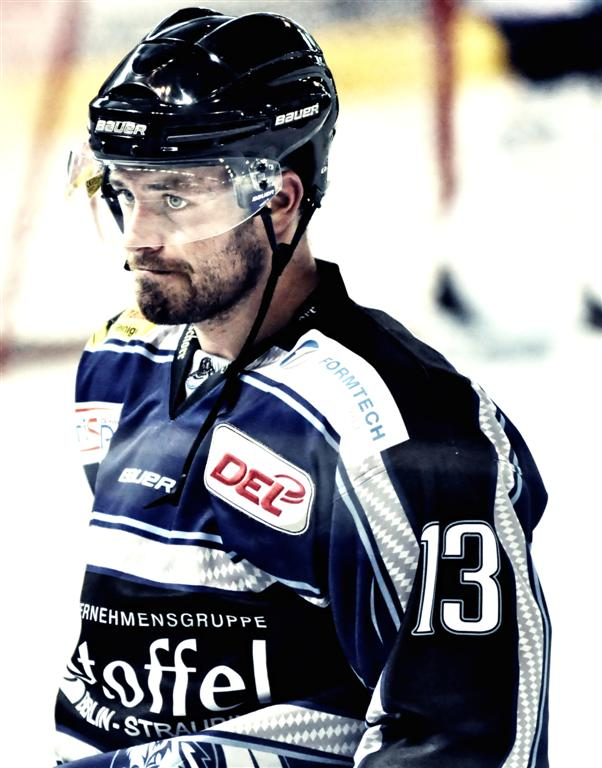
- Born: October 16, 1984 (age 40); Brampton, Ontario, Canada
- Height: 5 ft 11 in (180 cm)
- Weight: 181 lb (82 kg; 12 st 13 lb)
- Position: Winger
- Shoots: Left
- team Former teams: Free Agent; Hartford Wolf Pack; Springfield Falcons; Iserlohn Roosters; Kölner Haie; Straubing Tigers; EHC München; Adler Mannheim; Grizzlys Wolfsburg
- NHL draft: Undrafted
- Playing career: 2005–present

Daniel Sparre (born October 16, 1984) is a Canadian-German professional ice hockey player. He is currently an unrestricted free agent who was most recently under contract with ERC Ingolstadt in the Deutsche Eishockey Liga (DEL). He is of German descent and holds a German passport.

== Playing career ==
Sparre started his professional career in the 2005-06 season with the Hartford Wolf Pack in the American Hockey League, followed by stints with ECHL’s Charlotte Checkers, Texas Wildcatters and Columbia Inferno as well as AHL’s Springfield Falcons.

In 2008, he decided to continue his career abroad and signed with Pontebba in Italy.

Sparre then moved to Germany for the 2009-10 season, joining the Iserlohn Roosters of the country’s top-tier competition Deutsche Eishockey Liga (DEL). Following his one-year stint in Iserlohn, Sparre played for two other DEL sides in the following years, Kölner Haie and Straubing Tigers.

On May 7, 2013, after two seasons with the Tigers, Sparre signed with DEL rival, EHC München. He had his contract renewed in 2014 and 2015. Shortly after winning the 2015-16 DEL championship with München, he signed a three-year deal with fellow DEL team Adler Mannheim, but parted ways with the team following the conclusion of the 2017-18 season. In September 2018, Sparre was picked up by the Grizzlys Wolfsburg.

After concluding his solitary season with the Grizzlys in 2018–19, registering 40 points in 48 games, Sparre left the club as a free agent on March 8, 2019. Sparre agreed to continue in the DEL, signing a one-year deal with his 7th club, ERC Ingolstadt, on April 15, 2019. Three months later for personal reasons in wanting to remain in North America, Sparre approached Ingolstadt for a mutual termination of his contract which was granted on July 19, 2019.
