= Denis Reul =

German ice hockey player

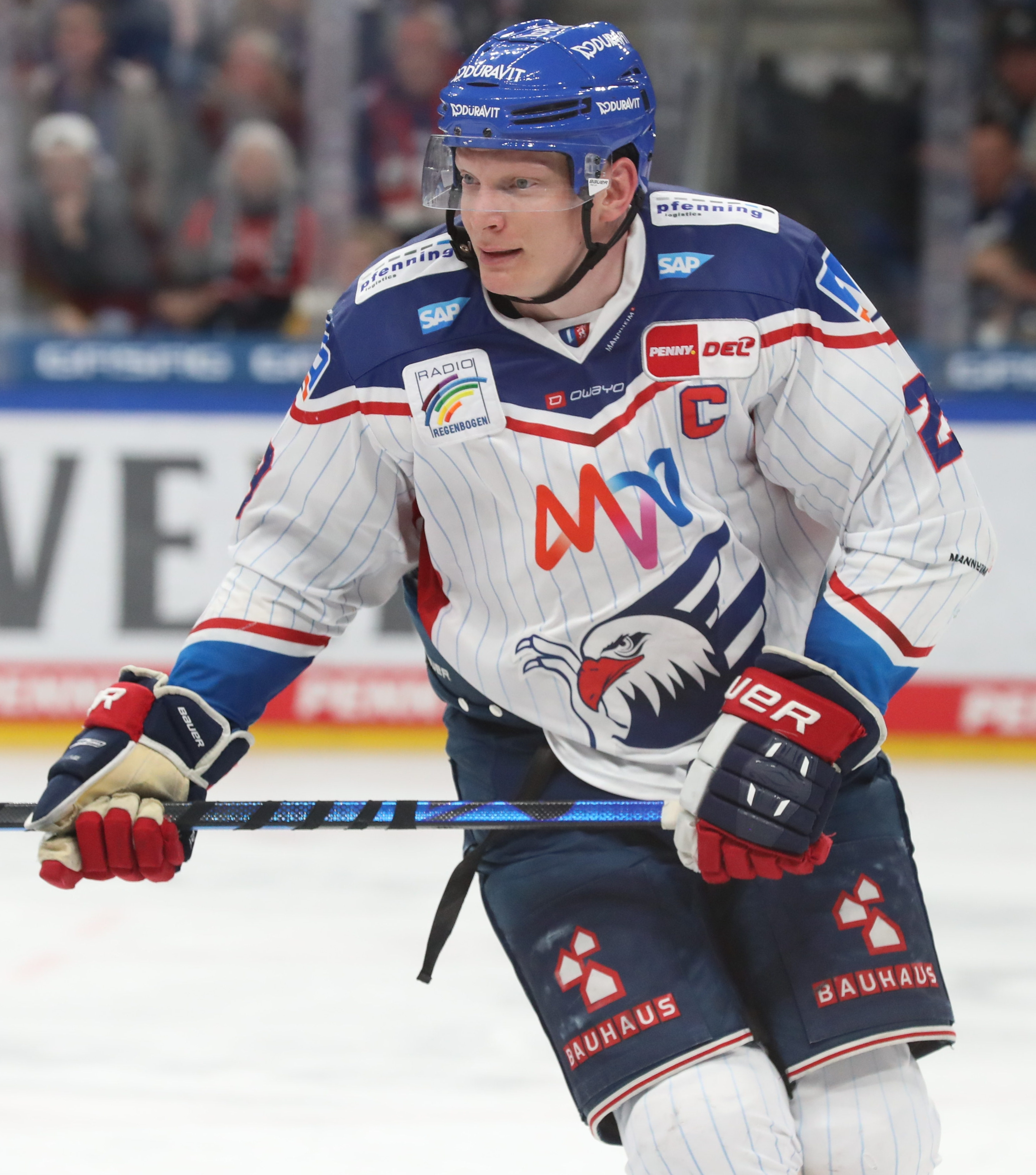
- Born: 29 June 1989 (age 37) Marktredwitz, West Germany
- Height: 6 ft 4 in (193 cm)
- Weight: 238 lb (108 kg; 17 st 0 lb)
- Position: Defence
- Shot: Right
- Played for: Providence Bruins; Adler Mannheim; Augsburger Panther
- National team: Germany
- NHL draft: 130th overall, 2007; Boston Bruins
- Playing career: 2007–2025

Denis Reul (born 29 June 1989) is a German former professional ice hockey player. He most recently played under contract for Augsburger Panther in the Deutsche Eishockey Liga (DEL).

== Playing career ==
Reul was selected by the Boston Bruins in the 5th round (130th overall) of the 2007 NHL entry draft after playing with Mannheim in the lower German divisions. After he was selected by the Bruins, Reul moved to North America and played junior with Lewiston MAINEiacs of the Quebec Major Junior Hockey League.

After completing his second season with the MAINEiacs in 2008–09, Reul then joined the Bruins' American Hockey League affiliate, the Providence Bruins on an amateur tryout. Without a contract offer from Boston, Reul returned to Germany and signed with Adler Mannheim of the Deutsche Eishockey Liga (DEL) on 10 July 2009.

On 26 October 2010, Reul extended his contract for another two years with Adler Mannheim.

On 24 August 2025, Reul announced his retirement from professional hockey.

== Career statistics ==
=== Regular season and playoffs ===
			Regular season					Playoffs
Season	Team	League	GP	G	A	Pts	PIM	GP	G	A	Pts	PIM
2004–05	Mannheimer ERC II	GER.4	1	0	0	0	0	—	—	—	—	—
2004–05	Jungadler Mannheim	GER U18	33	0	3	3	16	8	1	0	1	12
2005–06	Jungadler Mannheim	GER U18	36	6	13	19	40	5	0	1	1	4
2006–07	Jungadler Mannheim	GER U18	34	9	16	25	82	6	0	1	1	16
2006–07	Heilbronner Falken	GER.3	16	0	1	1	16	—	—	—	—	—
2007–08	Lewiston MAINEiacs	QMJHL	67	3	11	14	99	6	0	0	0	4
2008–09	Lewiston MAINEiacs	QMJHL	60	4	14	18	91	4	0	0	0	10
2008–09	Providence Bruins	AHL	5	0	1	1	6	—	—	—	—	—
2009–10	Adler Mannheim	DEL	54	0	8	8	62	2	0	0	0	0
2009–10	Heilbronner Falken	GER.2	9	0	0	0	28	—	—	—	—	—
2010–11	Adler Mannheim	DEL	51	2	5	7	117	6	0	2	2	8
2011–12	Adler Mannheim	DEL	47	2	5	7	99	14	0	5	5	0
2012–13	Adler Mannheim	DEL	31	1	4	5	32	4	0	1	1	0
2013–14	Adler Mannheim	DEL	39	0	15	15	54	5	0	1	1	4
2014–15	Adler Mannheim	DEL	46	2	9	11	44	15	2	2	4	10
2015–16	Adler Mannheim	DEL	16	0	3	3	26	3	0	0	0	2
2016–17	Adler Mannheim	DEL	52	3	11	14	28	7	0	0	0	4
2017–18	Adler Mannheim	DEL	39	0	5	5	20	9	0	0	0	4
2018–19	Adler Mannheim	DEL	47	0	8	8	22	14	1	5	6	16
2019–20	Adler Mannheim	DEL	50	7	7	14	28	—	—	—	—	—
2020–21	Adler Mannheim	DEL	36	1	8	9	49	6	2	0	2	2
2021–22	Adler Mannheim	DEL	35	2	5	7	14	9	0	1	1	4
2022–23	Adler Mannheim	DEL	55	2	11	13	25	12	0	1	1	0
2023–24	Adler Mannheim	DEL	50	0	7	7	15	7	1	1	2	2
2024–25	Augsburger Panther	DEL	50	1	1	2	24	—	—	—	—	—
DEL totals			698	23	112	135	659	113	6	19	25	56

=== International ===
Year	Team	Event	GP	G	A	Pts	PIM
2006	Germany	U17	5	0	1	1	8
2006	Germany	WJC18	6	0	2	2	6
2007	Germany	WJC18	6	1	3	4	4
2009	Germany	WJC	6	0	0	0	27
2011	Germany	WC	3	0	0	0	2
2012	Germany	WC	7	0	0	0	12
2014	Germany	WC	4	0	0	0	0
2016	Germany	WC	8	1	1	2	10
2017	Germany	WC	8	0	0	0	4
2019	Germany	WC	7	0	0	0	2
Junior totals			23	1	6	7	45
Senior totals			37	1	1	2	30

== Awards and honours ==
Award	Year
DEL
Champion (Adler Mannheim)	2015, 2019
