= Adam Mitchell (ice hockey) =

Canadian-German ice hockey player

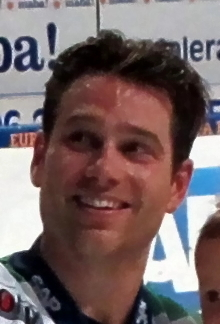
- Born: December 1, 1982 (age 43) Port Elgin, Ontario, Canada
- Height: 5 ft 11 in (180 cm)
- Weight: 187 lb (85 kg; 13 st 5 lb)
- Position: Right wing
- Shoots: Right
- DEL2 team Former teams: Löwen Frankfurt; Hannover Scorpions; Adler Mannheim; Hamburg Freezers; Straubing Tigers
- NHL draft: Undrafted
- Playing career: 2005–present

Adam Mitchell (born December 1, 1982) is a Canadian-German professional ice hockey player. He is currently playing for Löwen Frankfurt in the DEL2. Born in Port Elgin, Ontario, he was granted German citizenship in September 2014.

== Playing career ==
Mitchell played collegiately at Colgate University, serving as team captain as a senior. Upon graduation in 2005, he turned pro and started his overseas career in Germany. After spending two and a half years with minor league team EV Landsberg, he was picked up by the Hannover Scorpions of the German top-flight Deutsche Eishockey Liga (DEL) in December 2007. He won the German championship with the Scorpions in 2010.

Prior to the 2011-12 campaign, he joined fellow DEL team Adler Mannheim on a two-year deal. On June 20, 2013, out of contract from Adler Mannheim, Mitchell was signed to a one-year contract with the Hamburg Freezers. He eventually stayed with the Freezers until May 2016, when the organization folded. On June 2, 2016, Mitchell signed a deal with fellow DEL club Straubing Tigers.
