= Bernhard Ebner =

German ice hockey player

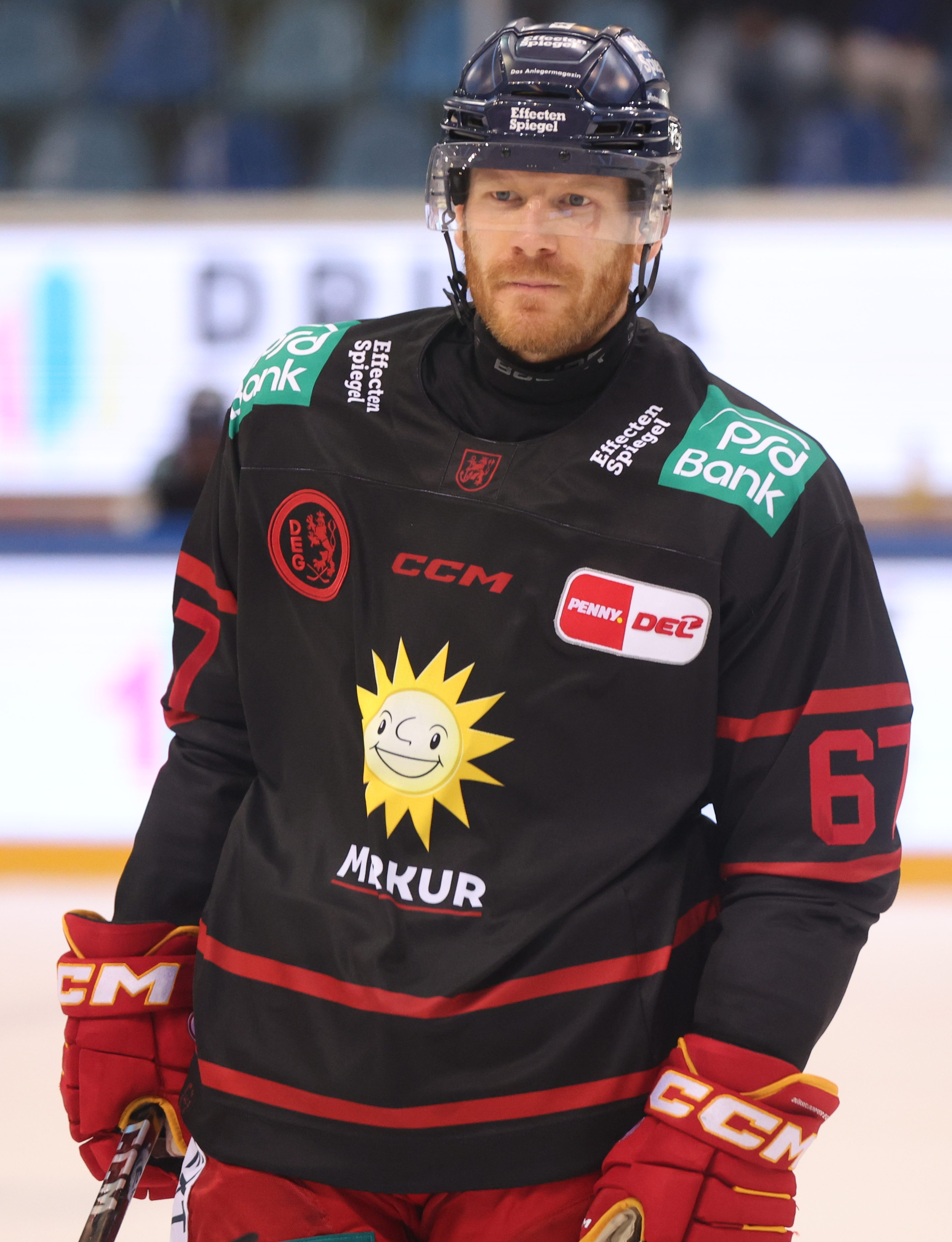
- Ebner in 2024
- Born: 12 September 1990 (age 34); Schongau, Bavaria, West Germany
- Height: 1.88 m (6 ft 2 in)
- Weight: 92 kg (203 lb; 14 st 7 lb)
- Position: Defence
- Shoots: Left
- DEL team: Düsseldorfer EG
- National team: Germany
- Playing career: 2008–present

Bernhard Ebner (born 12 September 1990 in Schongau) is a German professional ice hockey player. He currently plays for Düsseldorfer EG in the Deutsche Eishockey Liga (German Ice Hockey League).

Ebner has also played internationally for the German national team. He represented Germany at the 2018 IIHF World Championship.
