= Alexander Preibisch =

German ice hockey player

- Born: 30 April 1991 (age 35) Cologne, Germany
- Height: 5 ft 9 in (175 cm)
- Weight: 77 kg (170 lb; 12 st 2 lb)
- Position: Right wing
- Shoots: Right
- DEL team Former teams: Bietigheim Steelers; Düsseldorfer EG
- Playing career: 2009–present

Alexander Preibisch (born 30 April 1991) is a German professional ice hockey player. He is currently playing under contract with Bietigheim Steelers in the Deutsche Eishockey Liga (DEL). He previously played six seasons in the DEL with Düsseldorfer EG.
