= Mathias Lange =

Austrian ice hockey player

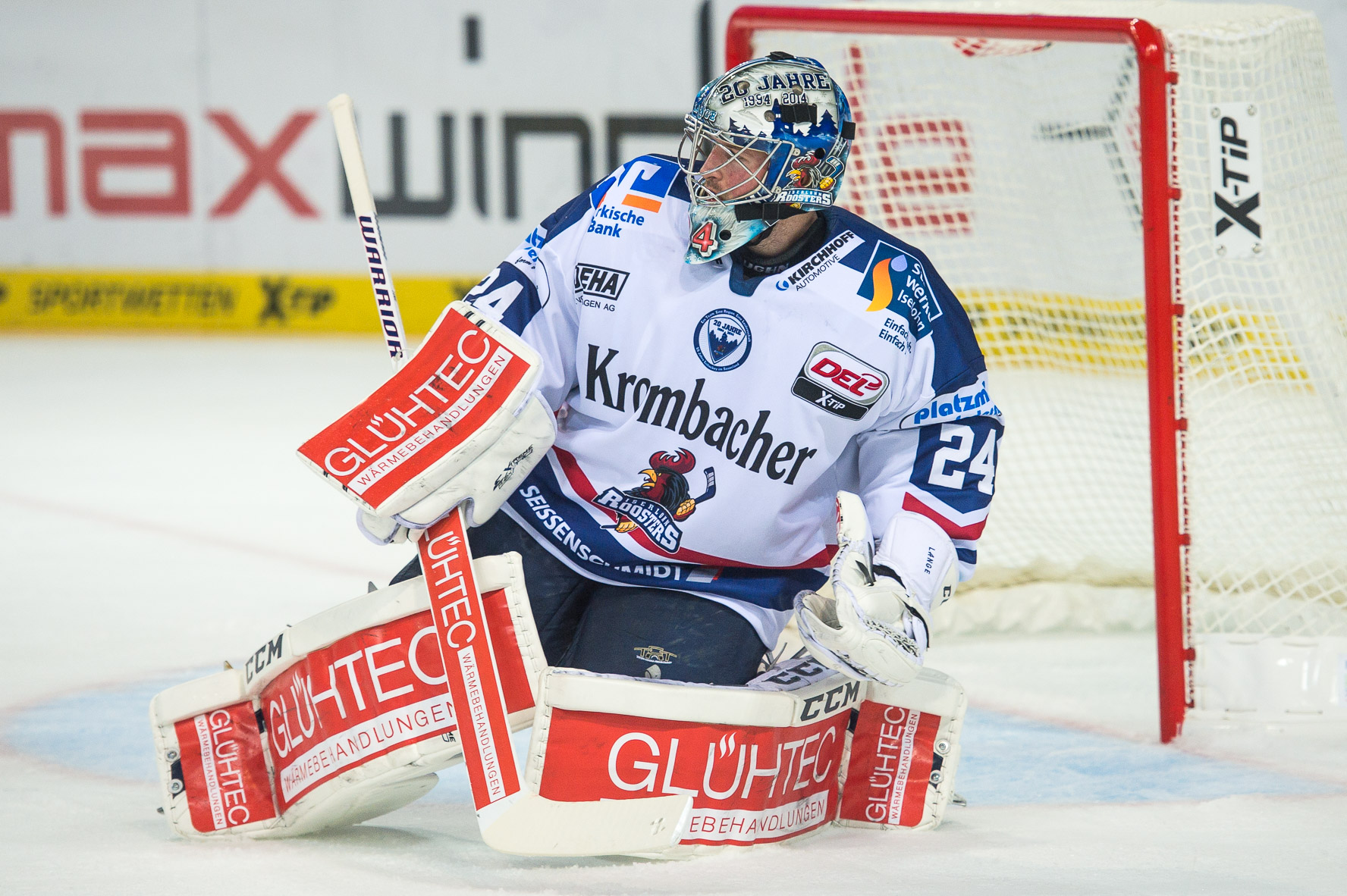
- Mathias Lange in 2014
- Born: April 13, 1985 (age 41) Klagenfurt, Austria
- Height: 5 ft 11 in (180 cm)
- Weight: 185 lb (84 kg; 13 st 3 lb)
- Position: Goaltender
- Caught: Left
- Played for: EC KAC; DEG Metro Stars; Iserlohn Roosters
- National team: Austria
- NHL draft: Undrafted
- Playing career: 2001–2019
- Coaching career
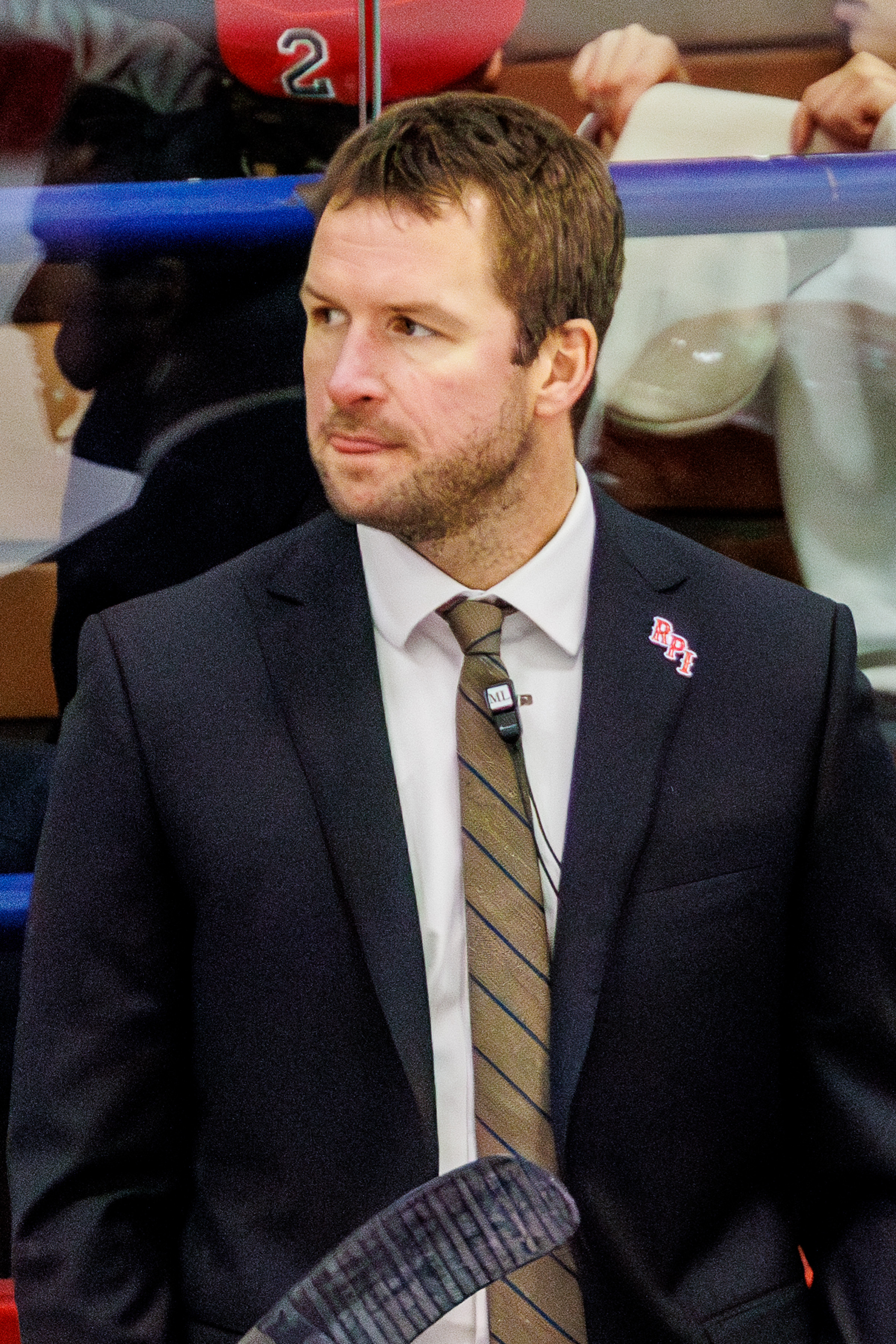
- RPI coach Lange in 2023

Current position
- Title: Assistant coach
- Team: Rensselaer
- Conference: ECAC Hockey

Biographical details
- Education: Rensselaer Polytechnic Institute

Coaching career (HC unless noted)
- 2019–2021: Rensselaer (dir. of hockey ops)
- 2021–Present: Rensselaer (assistant)

Mathias Robert Lange (born April 13, 1985) is an Austrian former professional ice hockey goaltender. He last played for the Iserlohn Roosters of the Deutsche Eishockey Liga (DEL).

== Playing career ==
Lange joined the Roosters after previously playing with SC Bietigheim-Bissingen of the 2nd Bundesliga. On July 27, 2013, Lange signed a one-year contract to be the backup goaltender with the Iserlohn Roosters of the DEL.

Lange played with the Roosters for 6 seasons before leaving as a free agent following the 2018–19 season on March 9, 2019.

Lange ended his professional playing career following his tenure with the Roosters, returning to North America in accepting a position with his former collegiate team R.P.I. as an operations co-ordinator. On August 10, 2021, Rensselaer announced the appointment of Mathias Lange as the Men's Assistant Hockey Coach.

== International play ==
Lange competed in the 2013 IIHF World Championship as a member of the Austria men's national ice hockey team. He made his Olympic debut on February 14, 2014 in the 2014 Winter Olympics in Sochi, Russia, playing for the Austrian team.

== Awards and honors ==
Award	Year
College
All-ECAC Hockey Rookie Team	2005–06
