= Dennis Endras =

German ice hockey player (born 1985)

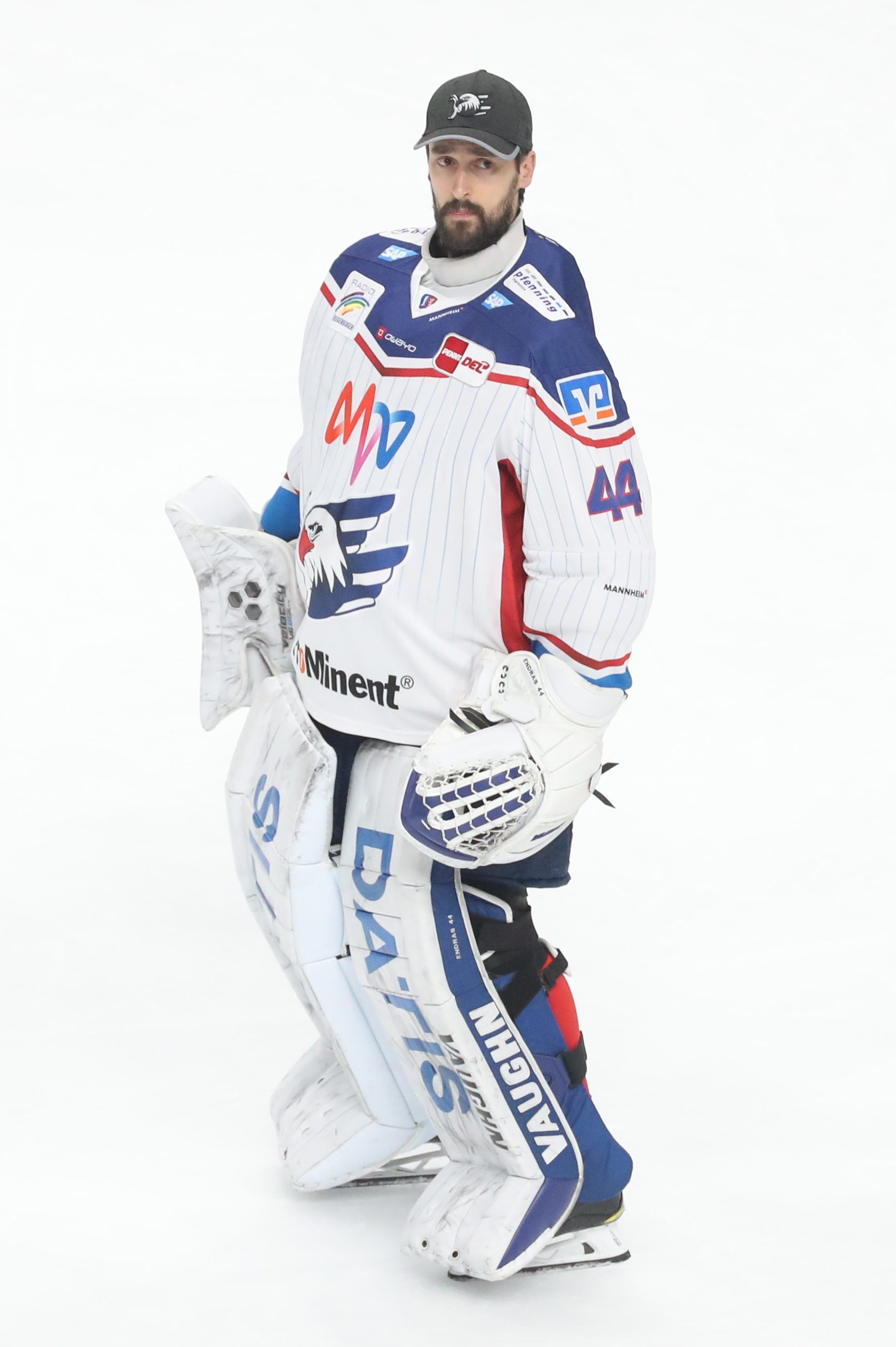
- Dennis Endras in 2022
- Born: July 14, 1985 (age 41) Immenstadt, West Germany
- Height: 6 ft 0 in (183 cm)
- Weight: 176 lb (80 kg; 12 st 8 lb)
- Position: Goaltender
- Catches: Left
- DEL team Former teams: Augsburger Panther; Frankfurt Lions; Houston Aeros; HIFK; Adler Mannheim
- National team: Germany
- NHL draft: Undrafted
- Playing career: 2003–present

Dennis Endras (born 14 July 1985) is a German professional ice hockey goaltender. He is currently playing with Augsburger Panther of the Deutsche Eishockey Liga (DEL).

== Playing career ==
Endras began playing for EHC Bayreuth in the Oberliga, the third-tier of ice hockey in Germany, in 2003–04. He played for Bayreuth again in 2004–05, but also made his Deutsche Eishockey Liga (DEL) debut that season with the Augsburger Panther. Over the next three seasons he spent time playing in the DEL and the 2nd Bundesliga for EV Landsberg, the Ravensburg Tower Stars, and the Frankfurt Lions.

He earned a permanent DEL position for the 2008–09 season with Augsburg, recording a 24–20–0 record.

In July 2010, Endras signed a contract with the Minnesota Wild of the NHL. On September 25, 2011, the Wild placed Endras on waivers so they could assign him to start the season with the Houston Aeros of the AHL. Endras subsequently played 6 games with the Aeros before leaving for HIFK Helsinki of the Finnish SM-liiga.

Coming back to Germany, Endras signed a contract with the Adler Mannheim in the Deutsche Eishockey Liga on May 25, 2012.

== International play ==
Medal record

Representing Germany

Ice hockey

Olympic Games
| Silver medal – second place | 2018 Pyeongchang | |

Endras has played internationally for the German national team at the 2009 and 2010 World Championships and was selected for the 2010 Olympics. At the 2010 World Championship, held in Germany, Endras was named the tournament's most valuable player. He became the first German selected MVP of the tournament, and the first to appear on the tournament's All-Star team since 1987.

== Awards and honours ==
| Award | Year |
|---|---|
IIHF
| Ice Hockey World Championship All-Star Team | 2010 |
| Ice Hockey World Championship Best Goaltender | 2010 |
| Ice Hockey World Championship Most Valuable Player | 2010 |
DEL
| Goaltender of the Year | 2013 |
| Champion (Adler Mannheim) | 2015, 2019 |
