= Tomáš Sýkora =

Czech ice hockey player

- Born: November 20, 1978 (age 46); Přerov, Czechoslovakia
- Height: 6 ft 2 in (188 cm)
- Weight: 214 lb (97 kg; 15 st 4 lb)
- Position: Forward
- Shoots: Left
- Czech Extraliga team: HC Zlín
- Playing career: 1999–present

Tomáš Sýkora (born November 20, 1978, in Přerov) is a Czech professional ice hockey player. He played with HC Zlín in the Czech Extraliga during the 2010–11 Czech Extraliga season.
