= Jochen Reimer =

German ice hockey player

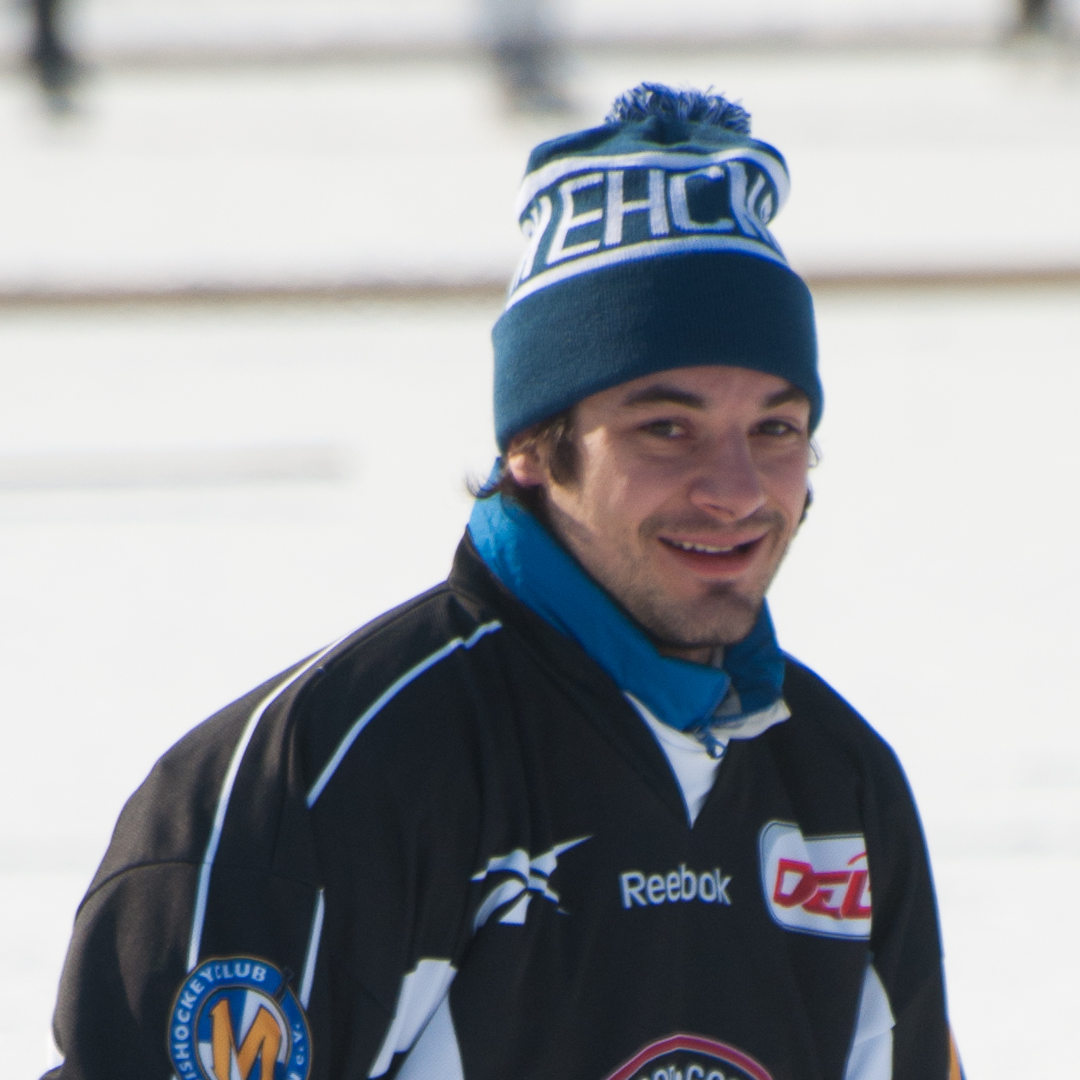
- Born: September 6, 1985 (age 39); Mindelheim, West Germany
- Height: 6 ft 0 in (183 cm)
- Weight: 198 lb (90 kg; 14 st 2 lb)
- Position: Goaltender
- Caught: Left
- Played for: DEG Metro Stars; EHC München; Grizzly Adams Wolfsburg; Thomas Sabo Ice Tigers; ERC Ingolstadt
- Playing career: 2006–2020

Jochen Reimer (born September 6, 1985) is a German former professional ice hockey goaltender who played in the Deutsche Eishockey Liga (DEL). He previously played with the Thomas Sabo Ice Tigers after a second tenure with EHC München from Grizzly Adams Wolfsburg on April 20, 2011.

After three seasons with the Ice Tigers, Reimer left as a free agent to sign a one-year deal in splitting the starting duties with Timo Pielmeier at ERC Ingolstadt on May 31, 2017.

On November 6, 2020, Reimer announced his retirement from professional hockey after 14 seasons.

He participated at the 2011 IIHF World Championship as a member of the Germany men's national ice hockey team.
