= 2015–16 DEL season =

- League: Deutsche Eishockey Liga
- Sport: Ice hockey
- Duration: 11 September 2015–22 April 2016
- Games: 364
- Teams: 14
- Total attendance: 2,419,630
- Average attendance: 6,647

Regular season
- Season champions: EHC München
- Season MVP: Patrick Reimer
- Top scorer: Patrick Reimer (64 points)

Finals
- Champions: EHC München
- Runners-up: EHC Wolfsburg
- Finals MVP: Michael Wolf

DEL seasons
- ← 2014–15 2016–17 →

The 2015–16 Deutsche Eishockey Liga season was the 22nd season since the founding of the Deutsche Eishockey Liga.

== Teams ==
Teams of the 2015–16 DEL season

Team	City	Arena
Augsburger Panther	Augsburg	Curt Frenzel Stadium
Eisbären Berlin	Berlin	Mercedes-Benz Arena
Düsseldorfer EG	Düsseldorf	ISS Dome
Hamburg Freezers	Hamburg	Barclaycard Arena
ERC Ingolstadt	Ingolstadt	Saturn Arena
Iserlohn Roosters	Iserlohn	Eissporthalle Iserlohn
Kölner Haie	Cologne	Lanxess Arena
Krefeld Pinguine	Krefeld	König Palast
Adler Mannheim	Mannheim	SAP Arena
EHC München	Munich	Olympia Eishalle
Thomas Sabo Ice Tigers	Nuremberg	Nuremberg Arena
Schwenninger Wild Wings	Villingen-Schwenningen	Helios Arena
Straubing Tigers	Straubing	Eisstadion am Pulverturm
EHC Wolfsburg	Wolfsburg	Eisarena Wolfsburg

== Regular season ==
Pos	Team	Pld	W	OTW	OTL	L	GF	GA	GD	Pts	Qualification
1	EHC München	52	25	6	7	14	160	124	+36	94	Advanced to playoffs
2	Eisbären Berlin	52	27	4	3	18	152	136	+16	92	Advanced to playoffs
3	Iserlohn Roosters	52	23	5	12	12	162	143	+19	91	Advanced to playoffs
4	EHC Wolfsburg	52	25	4	4	19	151	118	+33	87	Advanced to playoffs
5	Düsseldorfer EG	52	26	3	3	20	152	132	+20	87	Advanced to playoffs
6	Thomas Sabo Ice Tigers	52	23	5	4	20	161	152	+9	83	Advanced to playoffs
7	Kölner Haie	52	20	8	1	23	146	138	+8	77	Advanced to pre-playoffs
8	ERC Ingolstadt	52	23	0	7	22	155	161	−6	76	Advanced to pre-playoffs
9	Straubing Tigers	52	22	3	3	24	147	159	−12	75	Advanced to pre-playoffs
10	Adler Mannheim	52	20	5	3	24	138	146	−8	73	Advanced to pre-playoffs
11	Hamburg Freezers	52	18	6	6	22	142	166	−24	72	
12	Augsburger Panther	52	20	4	1	27	158	185	−27	69	
13	Krefeld Pinguine	52	15	5	6	26	136	164	−28	61	
14	Schwenninger Wild Wings	52	15	4	2	31	143	179	−36	55	

Source: DEL
Rules for classification: 1) points; 2) head-to-head points; 3) head-to-head goal difference; 4) head-to-head number of goals scored.

=== Results ===
==== Matches 1–26 ====
Home \ Away	AUG	BER	DÜS	HAM	ING	ISE	KÖL	KRE	MAN	MUN	NÜR	SCH	STR	WOL
Augsburg		4–2	4–8	4–1	2–4	4–1	2–7	3–5	0–3	4–6	1–3	5–1	4–3	1–6
Berlin	7–3		2–1	5–2	2–1	1–2	5–2	0–4	6–2	5–3	5–2	7–8 ^{OT}	7–5	3–2
DEG	2–4	2–0		4–1	4–8	3–5	2–1	3–1	1–4	0–3	6–4	2–1	4–2	0–3
Hamburg	5–3	3–0	4–3		4–2	1–2 ^{SO}	3–4 ^{OT}	4–3 ^{SO}	2–3	5–4	1–2	3–2	3–1	1–2
Ingolstadt	3–2	1–2	2–4	5–4		2–5	4–1	2–1	0–4	4–2	4–1	4–2	4–3	5–6 ^{SO}
Iserlohn	7–5	3–2	6–5	3–2	4–3 ^{SO}		6–1	3–0	4–5 ^{OT}	5–1	2–3 ^{SO}	6–2	6–2	1–0
Köln	2–3	6–1	3–6	6–1	3–4	4–3 ^{SO}		6–2	5–2	3–2 ^{OT}	5–2	2–3	1–2	3–0
Krefeld	3–0	1–2 ^{OT}	1–2	6–5 ^{OT}	3–2 ^{OT}	1–2	3–4		5–3	2–3	0–4	3–5	3–8	5–2
Mannheim	2–6	2–1	3–4	2–1 ^{SO}	3–1	2–1 ^{OT}	3–0	4–2		1–3	2–3	1–0	4–5	7–3
Munich	3–4 ^{OT}	2–1	3–4 ^{SO}	4–3 ^{OT}	6–3	3–2	1–2	6–2	4–2		3–4 ^{OT}	4–5 ^{SO}	2–3	4–3 ^{SO}
Nürnberg	2–6	3–2 ^{SO}	3–0	1–2 ^{SO}	5–4	4–3 ^{OT}	2–4	6–3	5–3	4–1		1–5	3–4	5–2
Schwenningen	4–5	2–3	3–1	2–4	4–2	4–3 ^{OT}	1–4	6–5 ^{OT}	2–4	4–2	1–3		5–2	2–3
Straubing	3–2	1–4	2–1	2–5	2–4	2–1	3–4 ^{OT}	4–3 ^{OT}	1–4	5–2	3–0	2–3		2–4
Wolfsburg	2–5	2–3	2–0	0–2	6–2	2–4	2–3	1–4	1–2 ^{OT}	2–3 ^{SO}	2–0	4–1	8–1	

==== Matches 27–52 ====
Home \ Away	AUG	BER	DÜS	HAM	ING	ISE	KÖL	KRE	MAN	MUN	NÜR	SCH	STR	WOL
Augsburg		0–1	1–5	6–2	4–3	4–3	4–5 ^{SO}	2–1	5–1	4–6	0–3	4–1	2–1	2–1
Berlin	4–2		2–7	2–3 ^{SO}	2–5	3–0	3–1	2–1 ^{OT}	4–0	2–5	2–6	2–4	6–2	1–0
DEG	4–5 ^{SO}	3–4 ^{OT}		7–1	4–5	7–4	0–3	0–1 ^{OT}	3–0	4–1	1–2	4–3	2–1	5–3
Hamburg	5–6	3–5	4–2		3–1	2–5	5–2	3–2 ^{SO}	2–4	2–1 ^{SO}	5–4 ^{SO}	3–0	6–4	1–5
Ingolstadt	1–6	1–4	1–2	3–4		4–1	3–4 ^{OT}	4–1	3–1	1–3	5–3	6–1	6–2	2–3 ^{OT}
Iserlohn	6–0	4–3 ^{OT}	1–2 ^{SO}	6–3	2–1 ^{SO}		0–1	6–2	2–3 ^{SO}	2–3 ^{OT}	4–2	1–4	3–2	3–2
Köln	4–2	4–3	3–1	3–1	3–4	2–0		3–4	2–3	3–4	4–3 ^{SO}	1–2	2–5	4–2
Krefeld	3–2	2–3	1–2	3–1	2–1	2–1 ^{SO}	3–2		4–7	1–2	6–7	5–2	1–2	4–1
Mannheim	1–2 ^{SO}	3–2	3–2	3–1	5–2	3–4	1–2	3–4 ^{SO}		1–2	1–3	5–3	1–4	4–5 ^{SO}
Munich	6–3	3–0	1–2	3–0	3–2 ^{OT}	2–1 ^{SO}	3–0	6–1	5–2		4–0	3–2	0–1	3–4 ^{SO}
Nürnberg	6–4	1–2	3–4 ^{OT}	5–3	2–4	9–3	3–1	1–3	6–3	2–4		4–2	4–1	1–3
Schwenningen	6–1	7–8 ^{OT}	2–4	2–3	4–3	4–5	4–3 ^{SO}	2–4	4–2	0–5	6–3		1–3	1–3
Straubing	7–2	4–7	2–1	4–3	3–4	5–4 ^{SO}	1–2 ^{SO}	4–2	4–2	2–1	1–2 ^{OT}	5–2		2–1 ^{SO}
Wolfsburg	8–1	3–2	0–2	4–0	4–1	3–0	4–0	5–2	2–0	3–2	2–1	5–2	5–3	

== Playoffs ==
=== Bracket ===
First round
7	Kölner Haie	2
10	Adler Mannheim	1
8	ERC Ingolstadt	0
9	Straubing Tigers	2

Quarterfinals
1	EHC München	4
9	Straubing Tigers	1
2	Eisbären Berlin	3
7	Kölner Haie	4
3	Iserlohn Roosters	2
6	Thomas Sabo Ice Tigers	4
4	EHC Wolfsburg	4
5	Düsseldorfer EG	1

Semifinals
1	EHC München	4
7	Kölner Haie	1
(Pairings are re-seeded after the first and second round)
4	EHC Wolfsburg	4
6	Thomas Sabo Ice Tigers	2

Finals
1	EHC München	4
4	EHC Wolfsburg	0

=== Playoff qualification ===
The playoff qualification were played between 9 and 13 March 2016 in a best-of-three mode.

==== Kölner Haie vs. Adler Mannheim ====
9 March	Kölner Haie	6–3	Adler Mannheim	Lanxess Arena, Cologne	Recap
Philip Gogulla – 07:55; Charlie Stephens – 13:06		First period	No scoring
Gogulla – 20:49; Patrick Hager – 23:00		Second period	22:43 – Christoph Ullmann; 35:19 – Sinan Akdag; 38:11 – Ullmann
Gogulla (ENG) – 59:01; Moritz Müller (ENG) – 59:35		Third period	No scoring
Gustaf Wesslau (42 saves / 45 shots)		Goalie stats	Youri Ziffzer (17 saves / 18 shots); Raymond Emery (6 saves / 9 shots)

11 March	Adler Mannheim	5–2	Kölner Haie	SAP Arena, Mannheim	Recap
No scoring		First period	No Scoring
Jon Rheault (PP) – 25:13; Christoph Ullmann – 26:13; Matt Lashoff – 29:39; Jochen Hecht – 34:47		Second period	39:40 – Johannes Salmonsson (PP)
Ullmann – 43:02		Third period	49:58 – Dragan Umicevic (PP)
Youri Ziffzer (18 saves / 20 shots)		Goalie stats	Gustaf Wesslau (23 saves / 28 shots); Daniar Dshunussow (5 saves / 5 shots)

13 March	Kölner Haie	4–2	Adler Mannheim	Lanxess Arena, Cologne	Recap
Jean-Francois Boucher – 17:23		First period	No scoring
Patrick Hager – 25:08; Andreas Falk – 36:50		Second period	38:29 – Marcel Goc
Falk – 53:55		Third period	56:00 – Jonathan Rheault (PP)
Gustaf Wesslau (28 saves / 30 shots)		Goalie stats	Youri Ziffzer (34 saves / 38 shots)

Köln won series 2–1

==== ERC Ingolstadt vs. Straubing Tigers ====
9 March	ERC Ingolstadt	3–4	Straubing Tigers	Saturn Arena, Ingolstadt	Recap
No Scoring		First period	02:13 – Sean O`Connor; 14:00 – Martin Hinterstocker
Petr Tatíček – 27:34		Second period	31:41 – Maury Edwards; 33:36 – Thomas Brandl
John Laliberte – 40:31; Tatíček – 50:47		Third period	No scoring
Timo Pielmeier (29 saves / 33 shots)		Goalie stats	Matt Climie (25 saves / 28 shots)

11 March	Straubing Tigers	2–1	ERC Ingolstadt	Eisstadion am Pulverturm, Straubing	Recap
No scoring		First period	17:43 – Dustin Friesen
No scoring		Second period	No scoring
Steven Zalewski – 58:07		Third period	No scoring
Maury Edwards (PP) – 65:44		overtime period	No scoring
Matt Climie (32 saves / 33 shots)		Goalie stats	Timo Pielmeier (33 saves / 35 shots)

Straubing won series 2–0

=== Quarterfinals ===
The quarterfinals were played between 15 and 28 March 2016 in a best-of-seven mode.

==== EHC München vs. Straubing Tigers ====
15 March	EHC München	5–0	Straubing Tigers	Olympia Eishalle, Munich	Recap
Steve Pinizzotto (EA) – 04:37; Michael Wolf – 17:20		First period	No scoring
Matt Smaby – 32:32		Second period	No scoring
Keith Aucoin (PP) – 47:20; Jeremy Dehner – 47:50		Third period	No scoring
David Leggio (23 saves / 23 shots)		Goalie stats	Matt Climie (39 saves / 44 shots); Dustin Strahlmeier (5 saves / 5 shots)

18 March	Straubing Tigers	1–2	OT	EHC München	Eisstadion am Pulverturm, Straubing	Recap
No scoring		First period		No scoring
No scoring		Second period		No scoring
Austin Madaisky – 44:23		Third period		54:24 – Matt Smaby
No scoring		First overtime period		64:12 – Yannic Seidenberg
Matt Climie (28 saves / 30 shots)		Goalie stats		David Leggio (27 saves / 28 shots)

20 March	EHC München	4–0	Straubing Tigers	Olympia Eishalle, Munich	Recap
Konrad Abeltshauser – 09:17; Jérôme Samson – 13:29		First period	No scoring
Mads Christensen (PP) – 21:11; Christensen – 26:37		Second period	No scoring
No scoring		Third period	No scoring
David Leggio (23 saves / 23 shots)		Goalie stats	Matt Climie (41 saves / 45 shots)

22 March	Straubing Tigers	2–1	EHC München	Eisstadion am Pulverturm, Straubing	Recap
No scoring		First period	No scoring
Martin Hinterstocker – 22:48		Second period	No scoring
Maury Edwards – 50:16		Third period	57:39 – Keith Aucoin (EA)
Matt Climie (29 saves / 30 shots)		Goalie stats	David Leggio (30 saves / 32 shots)

24 March	EHC München	2–1	Straubing Tigers	Olympia Eishalle, Munich	Recap
No scoring		First period	No scoring
No scoring		Second period	29:17 – Blaine Down (PP)
Michael Wolf – 41:06; Wolf (PP) – 49:39		Third period	No scoring
David Leggio (22 saves / 23 shots)		Goalie stats	Matt Climie (48 saves / 50 shots)

Munich won series 4–1

==== Eisbären Berlin vs. Kölner Haie ====
15 March	Eisbären Berlin	0–3	Kölner Haie	Mercedes-Benz Arena, Berlin	Recap
No scoring		First period	No scoring
No scoring		Second period	29:25 – Philip Gogulla
No scoring		Third period	42:20 – Patrick Hager; 59:06 – Alexander Weiss (ENG)
Petri Vehanen (19 saves / 21 shots)		Goalie stats	Gustaf Wesslau (30 saves / 30 shots)

18 March	Kölner Haie	0–1	OT	Eisbären Berlin	Lanxess Arena, Cologne	Recap
No scoring		First period		No scoring
No scoring		Second period		No scoring
No scoring		Third period		No scoring
No scoring		First overtime period		62:40 – Laurin Braun
Gustaf Wesslau (30 saves / 31 shots)		Goalie stats		Petri Vehanen (36 saves / 36 shots)

20 March	Eisbären Berlin	5–1	Kölner Haie	Mercedes-Benz Arena, Berlin	Recap
Florian Busch – 00:51; André Rankel – 16:37		First period	No scoring
T. J. Mulock – 32:18; Jonas Müller – 36:10		Second period	No scoring
Constantin Braun (PP) – 52:03		Third period	46:26 – Mirco Lüdemann
Petri Vehanen (31 saves / 32 shots)		Goalie stats	Gustaf Wesslau (42 saves / 47 shots)

22 March	Kölner Haie	4–0	Eisbären Berlin	Lanxess Arena, Cologne	Recap
Fredrik Eriksson (PP) – 08:36; Philip Gogulla (PP2) – 11:53		First period	No scoring
Gogulla – 33:50		Second period	No scoring
Shawn Lalonde (PP) – 57:37		Third period	No scoring
Gustaf Wesslau (28 saves / 28 shots)		Goalie stats	Petri Vehanen (29 saves / 33 shots)

24 March	Eisbären Berlin	4–1	Kölner Haie	Mercedes-Benz Arena, Berlin	Recap
André Rankel – 00:37		First period	01:17 – Nickolas Latta
Darin Olver (PP) – 36:26		Second period	No scoring
Florian Busch – 41:38; Marcel Noebels – 46:26		Third period	No scoring
Petri Vehanen (24 saves / 25 shots)		Goalie stats	Gustaf Wesslau (40 saves / 44 shots)

26 March	Kölner Haie	5–1	Eisbären Berlin	Lanxess Arena, Cologne	Recap
Fredrik Eriksson – 01:01		First period	No scoring
Torsten Ankert – 38:00		Second period	22:38 – Petr Pohl
Alexander Sulzer (PP) – 42:03; Johannes Salmonsson – 52:23; Philip Gogulla – 54:09		Third period	No scoring
Gustaf Wesslau (42 saves / 43 shots)		Goalie stats	Petri Vehanen (25 saves / 30 shots)

28 March	Eisbären Berlin	2–3	Kölner Haie	Mercedes-Benz Arena, Berlin	Recap
No scoring		First period	05:52 – Patrick Hager
Micki DuPont (PP) – 36:44; Mark Olver – 38:30		Second period	31:53 – Philip Gogulla (PP); 33:52 – Dragan Umicevic
No scoring		Third period	No scoring
Petri Vehanen (23 saves / 26 shots)		Goalie stats	Gustaf Wesslau (42 saves / 44 shots)

Köln won series 4–3

==== Iserlohn Roosters vs. Thomas Sabo Ice Tigers ====
16 March	Iserlohn Roosters	4–0	Thomas Sabo Ice Tigers	Eissporthalle Iserlohn, Iserlohn	Recap
Brodie Dupont – 00:29; Jason Jaspers – 01:39		First period	No scoring
Mike York (PP) – 36:45		Second period	No scoring
Jason Jaspers (ENG) – 54:17		Third period	No scoring
Mathias Lange (32 saves / 32 shots)		Goalie stats	Tyler Beskorowany (44 saves / 47 shots)

18 March	Thomas Sabo Ice Tigers	4–2	Iserlohn Roosters	Nuremberg Arena, Nürnberg	Recap
Leonhard Pföderl (PP) – 17:05		First period	15:23 – Bobby Raymond (PP)
Steven Reinprecht – 28:52		Second period	No scoring
Dave Steckel – 36:54; Patrick Reimer (ENG) – 59:43		Third period	59:12 – Brooks Macek (EA)
Tyler Beskorowany (22 saves / 24 shots)		Goalie stats	Mathias Lange (35 saves / 38 shots)

20 March	Iserlohn Roosters	1–4	Thomas Sabo Ice Tigers	Eissporthalle Iserlohn, Iserlohn	Recap
No scoring		First period	10:25 – Brandon Segal
Cody Sylvester – 39:29		Second period	20:22 – Steven Reinprecht
No scoring		Third period	49:42 – Marius Möchel (SH); 55:52 – Dave Steckel
Chet Pickard (31 saves / 35 shots)		Goalie stats	Tyler Beskorowany (34 saves / 35 shots)

22 March	Thomas Sabo Ice Tigers	7–1	Iserlohn Roosters	Nuremberg Arena, Nürnberg	Recap
Patrick Reimer – 09:18; Patrick Buzas – 17:31		First period	No scoring
Marius Möchel – 27:13; Dave Steckel (SH) – 39:13		Second period	No scoring
Marco Nowak – 44:09; Dany Heatley – 45:45; Alexander Oblinger – 50:10		Third period	56:51 – Luigi Caporusso
Tyler Beskorowany (30 saves / 31 shots)		Goalie stats	Chet Pickard (14 saves / 17 shots); Mathias Lange (26 saves / 30 shots)

24 March	Iserlohn Roosters	4–2	Thomas Sabo Ice Tigers	Eissporthalle Iserlohn, Iserlohn	Recap
Brodie Dupont – 10:18; Mike York (PP) – 11:24		First period	19:26 – Yasin Ehliz (PP)
No scoring		Second period	No scoring
Boris Blank (PP) – 42:41; Louie Caporusso (ENG) – 59:59		Third period	55:28 – Steven Reinprecht
Mathias Lange (28 saves / 30 shots)		Goalie stats	Tyler Beskorowany (35 saves / 38 shots)

26 March	Thomas Sabo Ice Tigers	3–2	Iserlohn Roosters	Nuremberg Arena, Nürnberg	Recap
Leonhard Pföderl – 18:30		First period	No scoring
Kurtis Foster – 24:26; Pföderl – 32:15		Second period	No scoring
No scoring		Third period	42:14 – Brooks Macek; 59:34 – Macek (SH, EA)
Tyler Beskorowany (31 saves / 33 shots)		Goalie stats	Mathias Lange (28 saves / 31 shots)

Nürnberg won series 4–2

==== EHC Wolfsburg vs. Düsseldorfer EG ====
16 March	EHC Wolfsburg	1–4	Düsseldorfer EG	Eis Arena Wolfsburg, Wolfsburg	Recap
No scoring		First period	No scoring
No scoring		Second period	22:22 – Tim Schuele; 38:49 – Marcel Brandt
Brent Aubin – 41:26		Third period	54:18 – Alexander Preibisch; 57:14 – Chris Minard
Felix Brueckmann (28 saves / 32 shots)		Goalie stats	Mathias Niederberger (25 saves / 26 shots)

18 March	Düsseldorfer EG	2–3	EHC Wolfsburg	ISS Dome, Düsseldorf	Recap
Drayson Bowman – 04:15		First period	01:47 – Kurtis McLean
Norm Milley – 22:45		Second period	21:01 – Tim Hambly (PP); 39:00 – Jeff Likens
No scoring		Third period	No scoring
Mathias Niederberger (28 saves / 31 shots)		Goalie stats	Felix Brueckmann (28 saves / 30 shots)

20 March	EHC Wolfsburg	5–1	Düsseldorfer EG	Eis Arena Wolfsburg, Wolfsburg	Recap
No scoring		First period	10:17 – Ken André Olimb (PP)
James Sharrow (SH) – 27:11; Tyler Haskins – 35:50		Second period	No scoring
Gerrit Fauser – 53:05; Fauser – 55:22; Sebastian Furchner – 58:06		Third period	No scoring
Felix Brueckmann (27 saves / 28 shots)		Goalie stats	Mathias Niederberger (28 saves / 33 shots)

22 March	Düsseldorfer EG	0–1	OT	EHC Wolfsburg	ISS Dome, Düsseldorf	Recap
No scoring		First period		No scoring
No scoring		Second period		No scoring
No scoring		Third period		No scoring
No scoring		First overtime period		50:10 – Brent Aubin
Mathias Niederberger (30 saves / 31 shots)		Goalie stats		Felix Brueckmann (22 saves / 22 shots)

24 March	EHC Wolfsburg	4–1	Düsseldorfer EG	Eis Arena Wolfsburg, Wolfsburg	Recap
No scoring		First period	09:14 – Bernhard Ebner (PP)
Jeff Likens (PP) – 23:31; Gerrit Fauser (PP) – 24:44; Likens – 26:51		Second period	No scoring
Mark Voakes – 40:19		Third period	No scoring
Felix Brueckmann (18 saves / 19 shots)		Goalie stats	Mathias Niederberger (37 saves / 41 shots)

Wolfsburg won series 4–1

=== Semifinals ===
The semifinals were played between 30 March and 13 April 2016 in a best-of-seven mode.

==== EHC München vs. Kölner Haie ====
30 March	EHC München	5–1	Kölner Haie	Olympia Eishalle, Munich	Recap
No scoring		First period	10:29 – Marcel Ohmann
Mads Christensen – 21:30; Jérôme Samson – 24:20; Frank Mauer – 38:54		Second period	No scoring
Michael Wolf (PS) – 52:13; Mauer (ENG) – 56:35		Third period	No scoring
David Leggio (25 saves / 26 shots)		Goalie stats	Gustaf Wesslau (47 saves / 51 shots)

1 April	Kölner Haie	5–1	EHC München	Lanxess Arena, Cologne	Recap
Patrick Hager – 03:58; Nickolas Latta – 06:04; Ryan Jones – 18:49		First period	No scoring
Hager (PP2) – 48:09		Second period	36:51 – Steve Pinizzotto
Jones (SH) – 38:54		Third period	No scoring
Gustaf Wesslau (37 saves / 38 shots)		Goalie stats	David Leggio (22 saves / 27 shots)

3 April	EHC München	3–1	Kölner Haie	Olympia Eishalle, Munich	Recap
Michael Wolf – 07:14		First period	No scoring
Wolf (PP) – 27:08; Frank Mauer – 38:34		Second period	No scoring
No scoring		Third period	58:21 – Alexander Weiss
David Leggio (24 saves / 25 shots)		Goalie stats	Gustaf Wesslau (42 saves / 45 shots)

6 April	Kölner Haie	1–5	EHC München	Lanxess Arena, Cologne	Recap
No scoring		First period	08:27 – Jeremy Dehner
No scoring		Second period	25:34 – Jérôme Samson; 33:16 – Samson
Patrick Hager (PP) – 46:22		Third period	40:24 – Dominik Kahun; 47:56 – Michael Wolf
Gustaf Wesslau (31 saves / 36 shots)		Goalie stats	David Leggio (26 saves / 27 shots)

8 April	EHC München	5–4	Kölner Haie	Olympia Eishalle, Munich	Recap
Jason Jaffray (PP) – 03:13; Frank Mauer – 08:06; Mads Christensen (PP) – 11:30		First period	09:36 – Philip Gogulla
No scoring		Second period	22:49 – Ryan Jones (PP)
Dominik Kahun – 43:00; Mauer – 59:37		Third period	48:56 – Andreas Falk; 59:26 – Dragan Umicevic (PP)
David Leggio (28 saves / 32 shots)		Goalie stats	Gustaf Wesslau (37 saves / 42 shots)

Munich won series 4–1

==== EHC Wolfsburg vs. Thomas Sabo Ice Tigers ====
30 March	EHC Wolfsburg	6–2	Thomas Sabo Ice Tigers	Eis Arena Wolfsburg, Wolfsburg	Recap
Robbie Bina – 16:02		First period	10:20 – Yasin Ehliz
Sebastian Furchner – 23:44; Kurtis McLean (PP) – 26:49; Brent Aubin – 28:43; Mark Voakes (PP) – 35:35		Second period	34:20 – Saša Martinović
Daniel Widing – 44:23		Third period	No scoring
Felix Brueckmann (34 saves / 36 shots)		Goalie stats	Tyler Beskorowany (18 saves / 23 shots); Andreas Jenike (6 saves / 7 shots)

1 April	Thomas Sabo Ice Tigers	1–3	EHC Wolfsburg	Nuremberg Arena, Nürnberg	Recap
Brandon Segal – 17:49		First period	06:14 – Brent Aubin
No scoring		Second period	38:56– Jeff Likens
No scoring		Third period	59:21 – Mark Voakes (ENG)
Tyler Beskorowany (16 saves / 18 shots)		Goalie stats	Sebastian Vogl (31 saves / 32 shots)

3 April	EHC Wolfsburg	3–0	Thomas Sabo Ice Tigers	Eis Arena Wolfsburg, Wolfsburg	Recap
Daniel Widing – 12:55		First period	No scoring
No scoring		Second period	No scoring
Mark Voakes (SH, ENG) – 58:59; Voakes (SH, ENG) – 59:46		Third period	No scoring
Felix Brueckmann (21 saves / 21 shots)		Goalie stats	Tyler Beskorowany (17 saves / 18 shots)

5 April	Thomas Sabo Ice Tigers	5–4	EHC Wolfsburg	Nuremberg Arena, Nürnberg	Recap
No scoring		First period	03:42 – Gerrit Fauser (PP2)
Patrick Reimer (SH) – 30:16; Matt Murley – 37:10		Second period	27:56 – Brent Aubin; 28:22 – Christoph Hoehenleitner; 38:53 – Höhenleitner
Kurtis Foster – 41:29; Murley – 44:57; Saša Martinović – 51:27		Third period	No scoring
Tyler Beskorowany (29 saves / 33 shots)		Goalie stats	Felix Brueckmann (33 saves / 38 shots)

8 April	EHC Wolfsburg	2–3	2OT	Thomas Sabo Ice Tigers	Eis Arena Wolfsburg, Wolfsburg	Recap
No scoring		First period		No scoring
Tyson Mulock – 29:05; Christoph Höhenleitner – 32:02		Second period		No scoring
No scoring		Third period		47:48 – Derek Joslin; 48:18 – Brandon Segal
No scoring		Second overtime period		85:28 – Patrick Reimer
Felix Brueckmann (47 saves / 50 shots)		Goalie stats		Tyler Beskorowany (32 saves / 34 shots)

10 April	Thomas Sabo Ice Tigers	1–2	EHC Wolfsburg	Nuremberg Arena, Nürnberg	Recap
No scoring		First period	No scoring
No scoring		Second period	26:14 – Sebastian Furchner; 35:12 – James Sharrow (SH)
Daniel Heatley – 43:38		Third period	No scoring
Tyler Beskorowany (21 saves / 23 shots)		Goalie stats	Felix Brueckmann (33 saves / 34 shots)

Wolfsburg won series 4–2

=== Final ===
The finals were played between 15 and 28 April 2016 in a best-of-seven mode.

15 April	EHC München	2–1	OT	EHC Wolfsburg	Olympia Eishalle, Munich	Recap
Jérôme Samson – 11:22		First period		No scoring
No scoring		Second period		No scoring
No scoring		Third period		46:48 – Andy Reiss
Jeremy Dehner (PP) – 61:40		First overtime period		No scoring
David Leggio (21 saves / 22 shots)		Goalie stats		Felix Brueckmann (46 saves / 48 shots)

17 April	EHC Wolfsburg	4–5	EHC München	Eis Arena Wolfsburg, Wolfsburg	Recap
Brent Aubin – 01:57; Vincenz Mayer – 05:48		First period	08:14 – Jeremy Dehner
No scoring		Second period	32:40 – Steve Pinizzotto; 33:25 – Yannic Seidenberg
James Sharrow – 54:31; Mark Voakes (EA) – 58:44		Third period	52:42 – Jason Jaffray (PP); 53:47 – Dominik Kahun (PP)
Felix Brueckmann (26 saves / 31 shots)		Goalie stats	David Leggio (17 saves / 21 shots)

19 April	EHC München	4–1	EHC Wolfsburg	Olympia Eishalle, Munich	Recap
Uli Maurer – 10:40		First period	No scoring
Jeremy Dehner – 29:29		Second period	No scoring
Mads Christensen (PP) – 51:50; Jason Jaffray (ENG) – 59:02		Third period	56:58 – Tim Hambly (PP)
David Leggio (29 saves / 30 shots)		Goalie stats	Felix Brueckmann (31 saves / 34 shots)

22 April	EHC Wolfsburg	3–5	EHC München	Eis Arena Wolfsburg, Wolfsburg	Recap
Mark Voakes (SH) – 16:36; Gerrit Fauser – 17:37		First period	09:04 – Toni Söderholm; 17:16 – Michael Wolf (PP)
Voakes – 33:37 (PP)		Second period	36:08– Maximilian Kastner
No scoring		Third period	47:42 – Keith Aucoin; 50:48 – Steve Pinizzotto
Felix Brueckmann (27 saves / 32 shots)		Goalie stats	David Leggio (18 saves / 21 shots)

Munich won series 4–0
