= Andy Reiss =

German ice hockey player

André Reiss
- Born: May 17, 1986 (age 38); Hannover, West Germany
- Height: 1.85 m (6 ft 1 in)
- Weight: 86 kg (190 lb; 13 st 8 lb)
- Position: Defence
- Shoots: Left
- Oberliga team Former teams: Hannover Scorpions; Augsburger Panther; Grizzlys Wolfsburg
- National team: Germany
- NHL draft: Undrafted
- Playing career: 2002–present

André "Andy" Reiss (German: André Reiß; born August 5, 1986) is a German professional ice hockey defenceman. He is currently playing for the Hannover Scorpions of the Oberliga.

== Career ==
Reiss began his career with the Hannover Scorpions of the Deutsche Eishockey Liga and played with the team from 2002 to 2013. On March 25, 2013, it was announced that Reiss signed with Augsburger Panther on a one-year contract for the 2013–14 season.

After two seasons with the Panthers, Reiss signed a free agent contract for two-years in a return with EHC Wolfsburg of the DEL on April 14, 2015.

Reiss represented Germany in the 2008 IIHF World Championship.

== Career statistics ==
			Regular season					Playoffs
Season	Team	League	GP	G	A	Pts	PIM	GP	G	A	Pts	PIM
2002–03	Hannover Scorpions	DEL	3	0	0	0	0	—	—	—	—	—
2003–04	Oshawa Generals	OHL	42	0	1	1	8	3	0	0	0	0
2004–05	Hannover Scorpions	DEL	19	0	2	2	4	—	—	—	—	—
2004–05	Fischtown Pinguins	2.GBun	18	0	2	2	24	—	—	—	—	—
2005–06	Hannover Scorpions	DEL	15	0	1	1	8	—	—	—	—	—
2005–06	Hannover Indians	3.GBun	17	8	6	14	49	8	1	4	5	37
2006–07	Hannover Scorpions	DEL	39	1	2	3	8	5	0	0	0	2
2006–07	Fischtown Pinguins	2.GBun	4	0	0	0	0	—	—	—	—	—
2006–07	Grizzly Adams Wolfsburg	2.GBun	10	0	2	2	54	6	2	0	2	4
2007–08	Hannover Scorpions	DEL	53	2	7	9	32	3	0	1	1	4
2007–08	EHC München	2.GBun	1	0	0	0	0	—	—	—	—	—
2008–09	Hannover Scorpions	DEL	49	8	12	20	40	11	0	1	1	4
2009–10	Hannover Scorpions	DEL	51	9	14	23	59	11	1	2	3	10
2010–11	Hannover Scorpions	DEL	51	4	9	13	30	5	1	2	3	8
2011–12	Hannover Scorpions	DEL	38	2	7	9	53	—	—	—	—	—
2012–13	Hannover Scorpions	DEL	40	1	6	7	8	—	—	—	—	—
2013–14	Augsburger Panther	DEL	50	8	12	20	16	—	—	—	—	—
2014–15	Augsburger Panther	DEL	49	3	13	16	30	—	—	—	—	—
2015–16	Grizzlys Wolfsburg	DEL	39	2	8	10	10	15	1	2	3	2
2016–17	ESC Wedemark Scorpions	Ger.3	7	2	3	5	41	2	0	2	2	4
2017–18	Kassel Huskies	DEL2	48	3	20	23	14	6	1	3	4	0
DEL totals			496	40	93	133	298	50	3	8	11	30
