= Philip Gogulla =

German ice hockey player

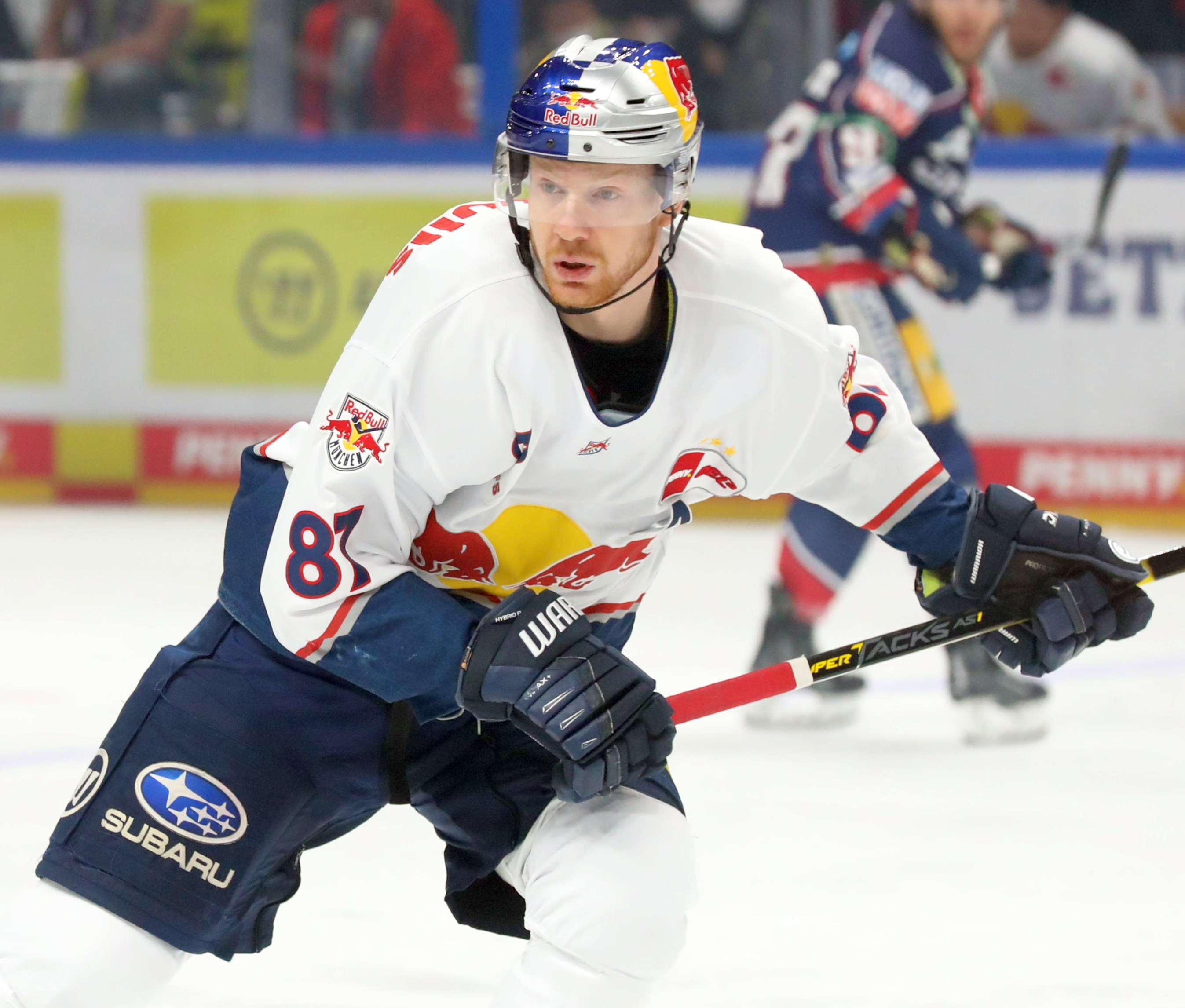
- Born: 31 July 1987 (age 38) Düsseldorf, West Germany
- Height: 6 ft 2 in (188 cm)
- Weight: 200 lb (91 kg; 14 st 4 lb)
- Position: Left wing
- Shoots: Left
- DEL team Former teams: Düsseldorfer EG; Kölner Haie; Portland Pirates; EHC München
- National team: Germany
- NHL draft: 48th overall, 2005; Buffalo Sabres
- Playing career: 2004–present

Philip Gogulla (born 31 July 1987) is a German professional ice hockey forward who is currently playing with Düsseldorfer EG of the Deutsche Eishockey Liga (DEL).

== Playing career ==
Gogulla began his professional career with the Krefeld Pinguine at the age of 15 in 2002, although his professional league debut in the DEL came first with the Kölner Haie two years later. He has since become a regular player for the team, and also represented the Germany national ice hockey team on several occasions.

Gogulla was drafted in the second round, 48th overall, by the Buffalo Sabres in the 2005 NHL entry draft. He signed an entry-level contract with the Buffalo Sabres on 1 June 2007, to prevent him from re-entering the NHL entry draft in 2007, although there was some confusion as to whether he had signed. NHL rules state prospects must be signed before 5:00pm EDT on 1 June or the team's rights to the player expire and he is free to re-enter the draft or become a free agent. Gogulla was signed by this deadline, but the contract had to be approved by the NHL. There was a delay in the approval process meaning the deal could not be announced and so it was assumed that the management had failed to sign Gogulla in time. On 2 June 2007, the deal was approved and announced as a three-year entry-level contract.

In the first two seasons of his deal, Gogulla remained in Köln on loan from the Sabres. On 22 March 2008, he ended the longest German hockey game ever and the second longest worldwide, scoring 8:16 into the sixth overtime period for a 5–4 victory over the Mannheim Eagles.

In the 2009–10 season, Gogulla stayed in North America after attending the Buffalo Sabres' 2009 prospects camp held at Dwyer Arena, home of the Niagara University Purple Eagles, from 6–10 July 2009. Upon completing his third NHL training camp he was reassigned to the AHL affiliate Portland Pirates.

Gogulla spent the entirety of the season with the Pirates and contributed 15 goals and 35 points in 76 games. Gogulla was recalled by the Sabres to their taxi squad for the playoffs following the conclusion of the Pirates post-season. Despite being unable to make his NHL debut, Gogulla was still named to the German extended squad to take part in the Vancouver Winter Olympics.

On 8 June 2010, as a restricted free agent from the Sabres, Gogulla opted to return to Kölner Haie and the DEL and signed a three-year deal to start in the 2010–11 season.

On May 18, 2018, after securing a release from his contract with the Sharks following his 13th season with the club, Gogulla signed with just his second DEL club, agreeing to a one-year contract with hometown team Düsseldorfer EG. In the 2018–19 season, Gogulla scored at a point-per-game pace to lead Düsseldorfer with 52 points in 52 games. After a first round seven game defeat to Augsburger Panther, Gogulla opted to leave the club at the conclusion of his contract despite an offer to remain with Düsseldorfer EG on April 6, 2019.

On April 29, 2019, Gogulla agreed to a one-year contract with perennial contending club EHC München.

== Career statistics ==
=== Regular season and playoffs ===
			Regular season					Playoffs
Season	Team	League	GP	G	A	Pts	PIM	GP	G	A	Pts	PIM
2002–03	Krefeld Pinguine	DNL	32	11	23	34	42	2	0	0	0	2
2003–04	Krefeld Pinguine	DNL	35	35	44	79	22	2	0	2	2	27
2004–05	Kölner Haie	DNL	7	4	5	9	18	—	—	—	—	—
2004–05	Kölner Haie	DEL	47	1	1	2	14	7	0	0	0	2
2004–05	Essen Mosquitoes	GER.2	3	0	0	0	0	—	—	—	—	—
2005–06	Kölner Haie	DEL	48	7	15	22	49	9	3	2	5	40
2006–07	Kölner Haie	DEL	44	8	13	21	26	7	0	0	0	8
2007–08	Kölner Haie	DEL	51	11	33	44	30	14	3	9	12	6
2008–09	Kölner Haie	DEL	48	17	21	38	58	—	—	—	—	—
2009–10	Portland Pirates	AHL	76	15	20	35	27	3	0	0	0	0
2010–11	Kölner Haie	DEL	52	13	33	46	50	5	2	2	4	0
2011–12	Kölner Haie	DEL	52	20	26	46	64	6	1	4	5	10
2012–13	Kölner Haie	DEL	46	11	21	32	14	12	4	5	9	8
2013–14	Kölner Haie	DEL	41	5	14	19	60	17	4	8	12	4
2014–15	Kölner Haie	DEL	52	14	12	26	26	—	—	—	—	—
2015–16	Kölner Haie	DEL	52	20	26	46	10	15	9	8	17	0
2016–17	Kölner Haie	DEL	51	17	29	46	18	7	0	4	4	2
2017–18	Kölner Haie	DEL	51	11	20	31	16	6	2	0	2	2
2018–19	Düsseldorfer EG	DEL	52	26	26	52	18	7	1	4	5	2
2019–20	EHC Red Bull München	DEL	46	11	24	35	22	—	—	—	—	—
2020–21	EHC Red Bull München	DEL	35	14	13	27	22	2	0	0	0	2
2021–22	EHC Red Bull München	DEL	53	15	12	27	22	11	2	2	4	2
2022–23	Düsseldorfer EG	DEL	56	9	38	47	16	7	3	5	8	6
2023–24	Düsseldorfer EG	DEL	51	7	14	21	14	—	—	—	—	—
2024–25	Düsseldorfer EG	DEL	51	8	9	17	16	—	—	—	—	—
DEL totals			979	245	400	645	565	132	34	53	87	94

=== International ===
Year	Team	Event	GP	G	A	Pts	PIM
2004	Germany	U17	5	1	3	4	2
2004	Germany	WJC18 D1	5	2	5	7	16
2005	Germany	WJC18	6	1	2	3	4
2006	Germany	WJC D1	5	1	6	7	30
2006	Germany	WC D1	5	1	3	4	8
2007	Germany	WJC	6	0	6	6	8
2007	Germany	WC	6	0	5	5	4
2008	Germany	WC	6	1	3	4	6
2009	Germany	OGQ	3	1	1	2	2
2009	Germany	WC	6	0	1	1	2
2010	Germany	WC	7	1	0	1	0
2011	Germany	WC	7	0	2	2	4
2012	Germany	WC	7	2	7	9	4
2013	Germany	OGQ	3	0	3	3	0
2013	Germany	WC	7	0	3	3	2
2016	Germany	WC	8	2	5	7	2
2017	Germany	WC	5	2	1	3	2
Junior totals			27	5	22	27	60
Senior totals			70	10	34	44	36
