= Jeff Likens =

American ice hockey player (born 1985)

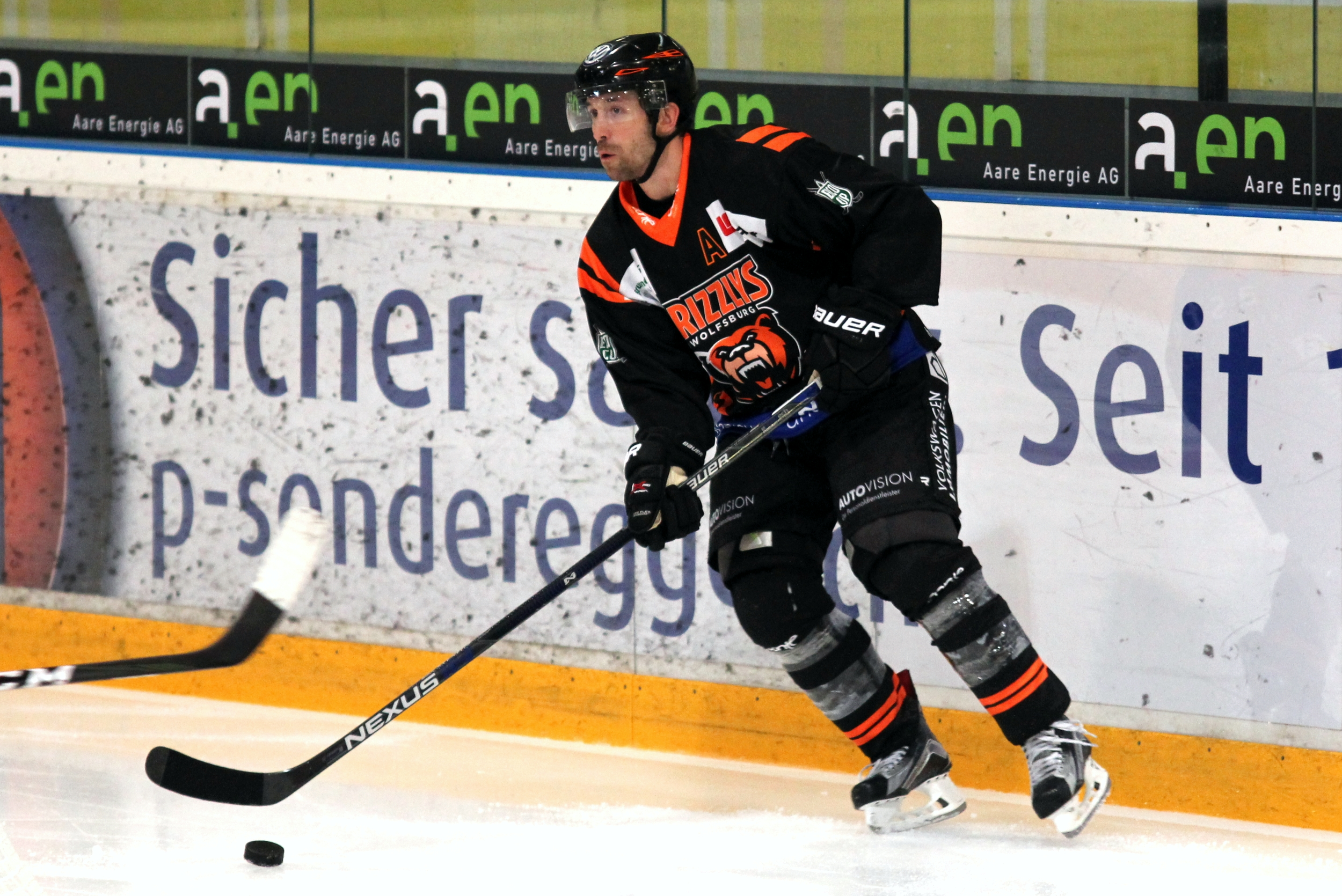
- Born: August 28, 1985 (age 40) Barrington, Illinois, U.S.
- Height: 5 ft 11 in (180 cm)
- Weight: 183 lb (83 kg; 13 st 1 lb)
- Position: Defense
- Shot: Right
- Played for: Manchester Monarchs; Augsburger Panther; Thomas Sabo Ice Tigers; ERC Ingolstadt; Grizzlys Wolfsburg
- NHL draft: Undrafted
- Playing career: 2007–2021

Jeff Likens (born August 28, 1985) is an American former professional ice hockey defenseman who played most notably in the Deutsche Eishockey Liga (DEL).

== Playing career ==
After spending two years playing for the US National Development Team Program, Likens spent four years playing for the University of Wisconsin–Madison before turning pro in 2007 with the American Hockey League's Manchester Monarchs. He also had a spell in the ECHL with the Reading Royals. In 2008, Likens moved to Germany and signed for Augsburger Panther. After two seasons, Liken left the Panthers and signed a one-year contract on April 12, 2010, for the Thomas Sabo Ice Tigers.

On April 8, 2011, Likens left the Ice Tigers after one season and joined ERC Ingolstadt on a one-year deal. After completing the 2012–13 season, his second with Ingolstadt, Likens was out of contract and signed a one-year deal with fellow DEL club, EHC Wolfsburg on April 17, 2013.

== Career statistics ==
=== Regular season and playoffs ===
			Regular season					Playoffs
Season	Team	League	GP	G	A	Pts	PIM	GP	G	A	Pts	PIM
2001–02	U.S. National Development Team	NAHL	46	0	6	6	24	—	—	—	—	—
2002–03	U.S. National Development Team	NAHL	10	3	2	5	19	—	—	—	—	—
2003–04	University of Wisconsin	WCHA	39	4	13	17	38	—	—	—	—	—
2004–05	University of Wisconsin	WCHA	39	3	14	17	54	—	—	—	—	—
2005–06	University of Wisconsin	WCHA	43	1	15	16	62	—	—	—	—	—
2006–07	University of Wisconsin	WCHA	40	1	5	6	42	—	—	—	—	—
2006–07	Manchester Monarchs	AHL	10	3	3	6	2	6	0	2	2	4
2007–08	Manchester Monarchs	AHL	56	2	21	23	28	4	0	0	0	6
2007–08	Reading Royals	ECHL	15	0	5	5	6	—	—	—	—	—
2008–09	Augsburger Panther	DEL	52	6	23	29	60	4	0	0	0	8
2009–10	Augsburger Panther	DEL	56	6	24	30	66	14	3	5	8	20
2010–11	Thomas Sabo Ice Tigers	DEL	52	9	16	25	78	2	0	0	0	10
2011–12	ERC Ingolstadt	DEL	52	10	19	29	93	9	1	4	5	6
2012–13	ERC Ingolstadt	DEL	52	1	13	14	66	6	0	1	1	10
2013–14	Grizzly Adams Wolfsburg	DEL	51	9	11	20	74	11	2	1	3	18
2014–15	Grizzly Adams Wolfsburg	DEL	52	6	27	33	80	11	2	3	5	24
2015–16	Grizzlys Wolfsburg	DEL	52	5	24	29	76	15	4	3	7	43
2016–17	Grizzlys Wolfsburg	DEL	51	3	28	31	64	18	0	6	6	43
2017–18	Grizzlys Wolfsburg	DEL	51	2	17	19	62	7	0	4	4	6
2018–19	Grizzlys Wolfsburg	DEL	52	4	13	17	50	—	—	—	—	—
2019–20	Grizzlys Wolfsburg	DEL	50	1	9	10	65	—	—	—	—	—
2020–21	Grizzlys Wolfsburg	DEL	37	1	5	6	44	9	1	0	1	10
DEL totals			660	63	229	292	878	107	13	27	40	198

=== International ===
Medal record

Representing United States

Ice hockey

World Junior Championships
Gold medal – first place	2004 Helsinki	

Year	Team	Event	Result	GP	G	A	Pts	PIM
2003	United States	U18	4th	6	0	2	2	2
2004	United States	WJC	1st place, gold medalist(s)	6	0	1	1	8
2005	United States	WJC	4th	7	0	4	4	0
Junior totals				19	0	7	7	10
