= David Leggio =

American ice hockey player (born 1984)

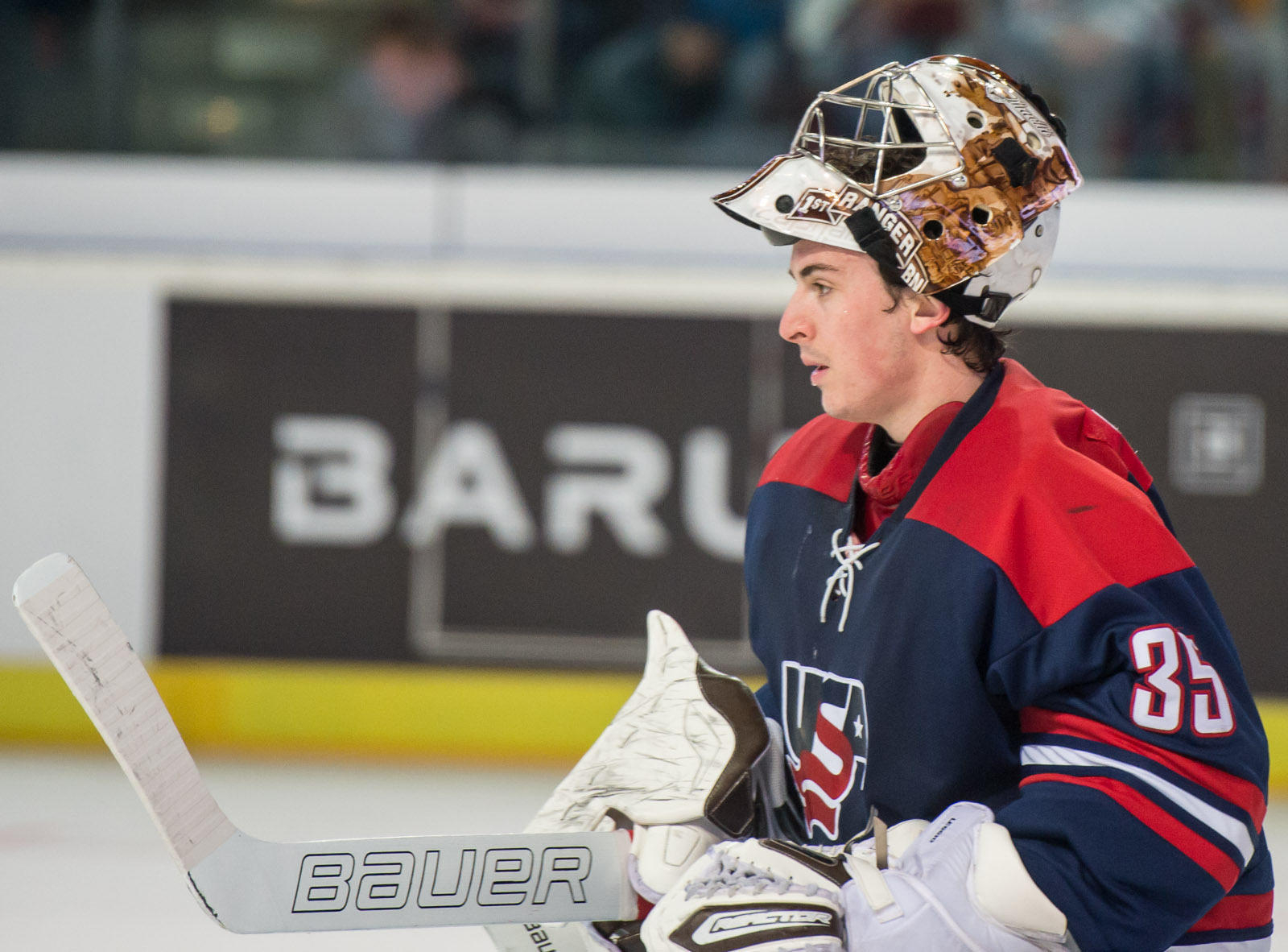
- Leggio with Team USA in 2014
- Born: July 31, 1984 (age 42) Williamsville, New York, U.S.
- Height: 5 ft 11 in (180 cm)
- Weight: 179 lb (81 kg; 12 st 11 lb)
- Position: Goaltender
- Caught: Left
- Played for: Binghamton Senators; Albany River Rats; TPS; Portland Pirates; Rochester Americans; Hershey Bears; Bridgeport Sound Tigers; EHC München; Grizzlys Wolfsburg
- National team: United States
- NHL draft: Undrafted
- Playing career: 2008–2019

David Leggio (born July 31, 1984) is an American former professional ice hockey goaltender. Leggio spent most of his playing career in the American Hockey League.

Leggio is perhaps best known for a controversial play in which he intentionally dislodged his own net to force a play dead when faced against a two-man breakaway, forcing the American Hockey League to implement a rule change to prevent similar incidents. Leggio would employ a similar strategy in a Deutsche Eishockey Liga game a few years later, prompting the league to likewise implement a ban on the maneuver.

== Playing career ==
Leggio played for four years at Clarkson University, where he amassed a record of 59–29–12 with a .922 save percentage and allowed an average of 2.3 goals per game. In his college career, he had 8 shutouts. At Clarkson, Leggio helped Clarkson win the Eastern College Athletic Conference tournament championship in 2007 and the Eastern College Athletic Conference regular season title in 2008.

Leggio's pro career began with an amateur tryout with the Binghamton Senators of the American Hockey League (AHL) at the end of the 2007–08 season, but for the 2008–09 season, he found himself with the Florida Everblades of the ECHL, sharing goaltending duties with Anton Khudobin on the way to winning the Brabham Cup as regular-season champions.

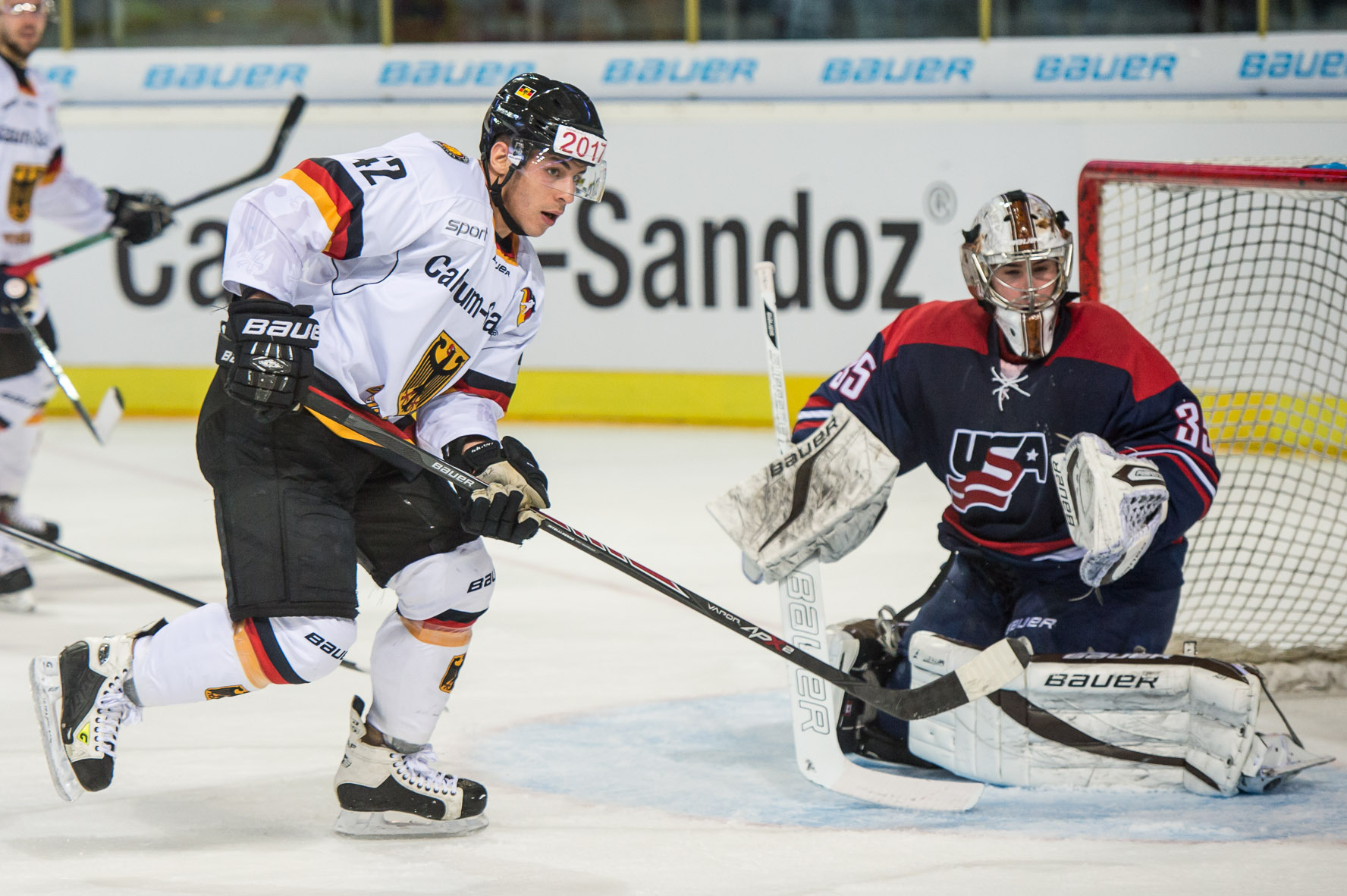
Leggio with Team USA

Leggio moved to Finland in 2009–10 to play for TPS in the top Finnish league, the SM-liiga, which bans net dislodging. Leggio played in 30 games in his season in Finland. He also played in 7 of TPS's playoff games, leading the league in postseason goals against average at 1.57 and helping TPS to the league title.

On August 8, 2010, Leggio returned to the United States, signing as a free agent to a one-year contract with the Portland Pirates of the AHL. Three months later, the Buffalo Sabres, the NHL team with which Portland was affiliated, converted Leggio's AHL contract to an NHL two-way contract, but kept Leggio in Portland. In 2010–11, he played 36 regular-season games for Portland and 9 in the postseason. Leggio was re-signed to the Sabres organization in June 2011, where he was assigned to the Rochester Americans (Buffalo changed minor-league affiliations from Portland to Rochester in 2011). Leggio saw action in 54 games for Rochester in the 2011–12 season, winning a career-high 28, but he went 0-3 in the postseason. Similarly, he saw 64 games for the Americans in the 2012–13 season, again winning a new career-high of 38, but also going 0-2 in the postseason.

On July 8, 2013, Leggio signed a one-year, two-way contract with the Washington Capitals organization. He spent the duration of the 2013–14 season with the Capitals AHL affiliate, the Hershey Bears.

On July 1, 2014, Leggio continued his journeyman career in signing a one-year two-way contract with the New York Islanders. During the 2014–15 season, on November 2, 2014 Leggio, at the time with the Isles' AHL affiliate Bridgeport Sound Tigers, earned a degree of notoriety for strategically dislodging his goal net during a two player breakaway, under the assumption that the penalty shot he would face as a result of the flagrant foul would be easier to defend than the breakaway (although, ironically, the 2-on-0 was swiftly marred by a mishandled pass during its fast-paced approach to the net). He stopped Dana Tyrell's penalty shot attempt as a penalty for dislodging the net. The league immediately passed a rule imposing a game misconduct penalty on any goaltender who attempted the move again.

On March 2, 2015, Leggio was traded by the Islanders to the Arizona Coyotes in exchange for Mark Louis; he was assigned to their AHL affiliate, in a return to the Portland Pirates.

As an unsigned free agent, Leggio accepted a tryout offer from the Winnipeg Jets on August 28, 2015. Upon his release from the Jets, Leggio opted for a second stint in Europe, agreeing to an initial one-year contract with German club EHC München of the DEL on October 22, 2015. While in Munich, Leggio pulled the same intentional dislodging of the goalposts (as the DEL had not yet outlawed the maneuver) in a game against the Fischtown Pinguins on December 9, 2017. The DEL changed its rules immediately thereafter, automatically awarding a goal if the net is intentionally dislodged. Leggio was also fined an undisclosed amount for the play.

Leggio suffered a severe concussion during a March 3, 2018 game, ending his season. He briefly considered retirement but eventually recovered with the help of doctors in his hometown. He then signed with injury-hit Grizzlys Wolfsburg early in the season. Leggio collected 12 wins through 31 games in the 2018–19 season with Wolfsburg, leaving the club as a free agent on March 8, 2019.

== International play ==
Leggio represented the United States at the 2018 Olympics.

== Personal life ==
Leggio received a degree in business from Clarkson University in 2008. He started working as a business banking relationship manager at Five Star Bank in February 2020. He also owns a company that hosts instructional groups and clinics for aspiring ice hockey goaltenders.

== Career statistics ==
=== Regular season and playoffs ===
			Regular season									Playoffs
Season	Team	League	GP	W	L	OT	MIN	GA	SO	GAA	SV%	GP	W	L	MIN	GA	SO	GAA	SV%
2004–05	Clarkson University	ECAC	5	2	1	0	182	9	0	2.97	.908	—	—	—	—	—	—	—	—
2005–06	Clarkson University	ECAC	23	11	9	3	1446	62	1	2.57	.913	—	—	—	—	—	—	—	—
2006–07	Clarkson University	ECAC	37	24	7	5	2167	78	2	2.16	.930	—	—	—	—	—	—	—	—
2007–08	Clarkson University	ECAC	38	22	12	4	2211	81	5	2.20	.920	—	—	—	—	—	—	—	—
2007–08	Binghamton Senators	AHL	1	0	1	0	30	2	0	4.06	.778	—	—	—	—	—	—	—	—
2008–09	Florida Everblades	ECHL	39	27	7	3	2284	86	4	2.26	.916	11	6	5	734	30	0	2.45	.885
2008–09	Albany River Rats	AHL	1	0	1	0	60	7	0	7.00	.788	—	—	—	—	—	—	—	—
2009–10	TPS	SM-l	30	12	13	3	1598	78	1	2.93	.901	7	5	2	419	11	1	1.58	.942
2010–11	Portland Pirates	AHL	36	22	12	0	1993	93	3	2.80	.911	9	5	4	510	27	0	3.18	.900
2011–12	Rochester Americans	AHL	54	28	24	2	3243	142	2	2.63	.917	3	0	3	175	11	0	3.76	.876
2012–13	Rochester Americans	AHL	64	38	24	1	3799	162	4	2.56	.924	2	0	2	125	8	0	3.84	.830
2013–14	Hershey Bears	AHL	45	23	18	3	2688	118	2	2.63	.913	—	—	—	—	—	—	—	—
2014–15	Bridgeport Sound Tigers	AHL	23	7	13	0	1267	83	1	3.93	.861	—	—	—	—	—	—	—	—
2014–15	Portland Pirates	AHL	5	1	2	1	274	11	0	2.41	.908	—	—	—	—	—	—	—	—
2015–16	EHC München	DEL	23	14	8	0	1369	46	4	2.02	.927	14	12	2	854	25	2	1.76	.930
2016–17	EHC München	DEL	24	16	8	0	1447	57	1	2.36	.902	—	—	—	—	—	—	—	—
2017–18	EHC München	DEL	25	15	10	0	1499	65	2	2.60	.914	—	—	—	—	—	—	—	—
2018–19	Grizzlys Wolfsburg	DEL	31	12	17	0	1799	85	5	2.83	.906	—	—	—	—	—	—	—	—
AHL totals			229	119	95	7	13,355	618	12	2.66	.917	14	5	9	610	46	0	3.41	.887
Liiga totals			30	12	13	3	1,598	78	1	2.93	.901	7	5	2	419	11	1	1.58	.942

=== International ===
Year	Team	Event	Result	GP	W	L	OT	MIN	GA	SO	GAA	SV%
2014	United States	WC	6th	1	0	0	0	29	1	0	2.08	.875
Senior totals				1	0	0	0	29	1	0	2.08	.875

== Awards and honors ==
Season	Award
2006–07	NCAA (ECAC) Champion
	NCAA (ECAC) Clarkson Team MVP
	All-ECAC Hockey First Team
	NCAA (ECAC) Goaltender of the Year
2007–08	NCAA (ECAC) Knight Club Award
	All-ECAC Hockey Second Team
2008–09	ECHL Goaltender of the Month (January)
	ECHL Goaltender Of The Week (01/12–01/18)
2009–10	SM-liiga Champion
2012–13	AHL Goalie of the Month (March)

Awards and achievements
Preceded by Mark DeKanich	Ken Dryden Award; 2006–07	Succeeded by Kyle Richter
