= Jeremy Dehner =

American ice hockey player (born 1987)

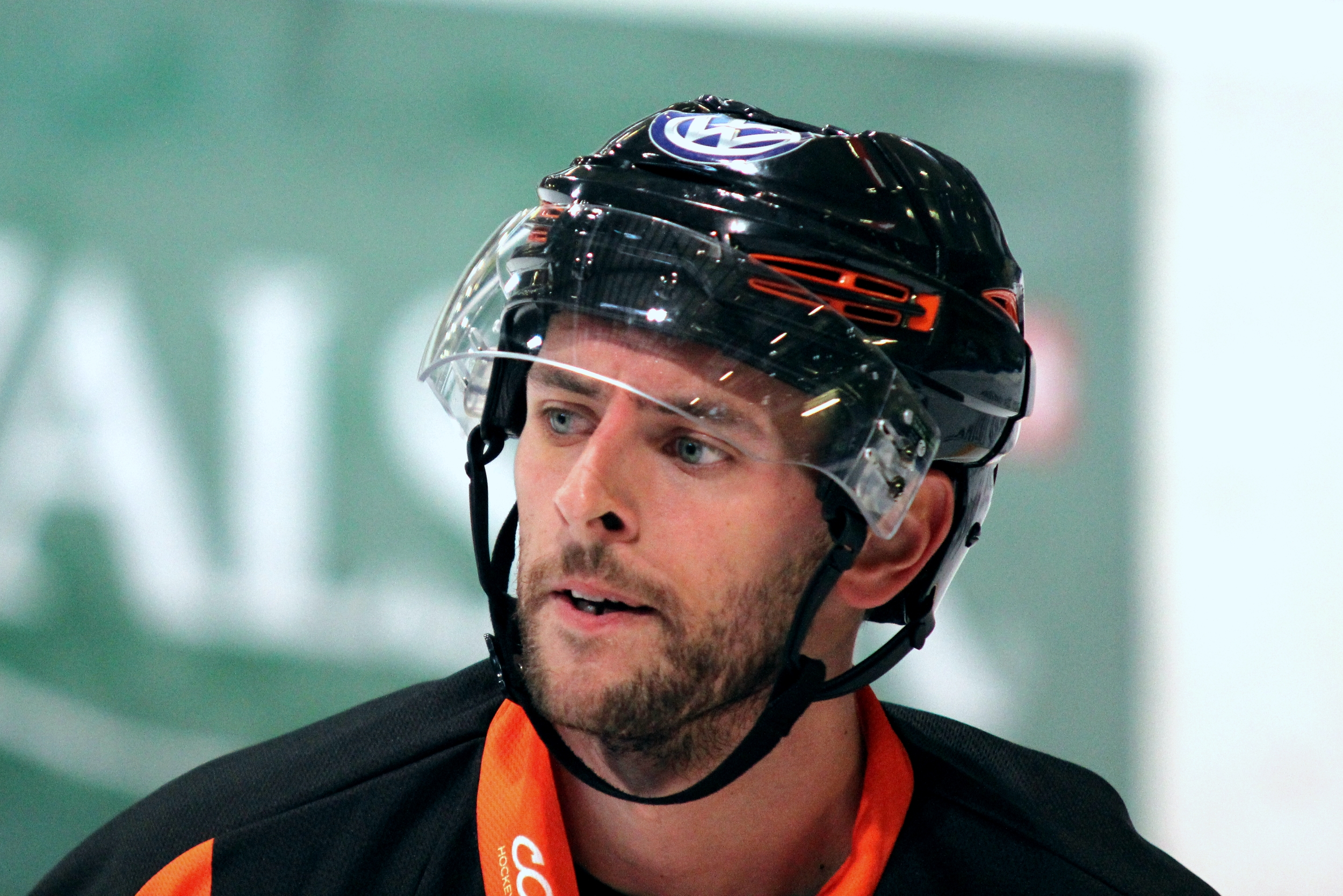
- Born: April 25, 1987 (age 39) Madison, Wisconsin, U.S.
- Height: 5 ft 9 in (175 cm)
- Weight: 180 lb (82 kg; 12 st 12 lb)
- Position: Defense
- Shoots: Left
- ECHL team Former teams: Florida Everblades; Norfolk Admirals; Jokerit; EHC München; Grizzlys Wolfsburg
- NHL draft: Undrafted
- Playing career: 2010–present

Jeremy Dehner (born April 25, 1987) is an American professional ice hockey defenseman who is currently playing for Florida Everblades in the ECHL. He formerly played in the Deutsche Eishockey Liga (DEL).

== Playing career ==
Dehner originally played with UMass Lowell's college team River Hawks of the NCAA before turning professional with the Norfolk Admirals of the AHL.

Dehner left North America to pursue a European career, signing with Finnish club Jokerit of the SM-liiga. Dehner established himself amongst the blueline with Jokerit over four seasons with the club. Upon their acceptance into the Kontinental Hockey League, Dehner left Finland to sign a contract in Germany with EHC München of the DEL on June 18, 2014. After capturing the German championship with the München team in 2016, he left the club and was picked up by fellow DEL side EHC Wolfsburg in July 2016.

After concluding his third season with the Grizzlys in 2018–19, Dehner mutually opted with the club not to take up the further year option on his contract, leaving as a free agent on March 8, 2019.

Dehner returned to play professionally in North America for the first time since 2010, agreeing to a contract with the Florida Everblades of the ECHL on October 7, 2019, to start the 2019–20 season. Dehner made just 10 appearances through the course of the season with the Everblades, before ending his contract and returning to Finland, playing 1 Liiga game with HIFK before the season was cancelled due to COVID-19.

== Personal ==
Former NHLers Gary Suter and Olympic medalist Bob Suter are Dehner's uncles. His cousin is Minnesota Wild's alternate captain Ryan Suter.

== Career statistics ==
			Regular season					Playoffs
Season	Team	League	GP	G	A	Pts	PIM	GP	G	A	Pts	PIM
2004–05	Green Bay Gamblers	USHL	55	2	12	17	55	—	—	—	—	—
2005–06	Green Bay Gamblers	USHL	54	8	31	39	38	1	0	0	0	2
2006–07	UMass-Lowell	HE	36	3	13	16	19	—	—	—	—	—
2007–08	UMass-Lowell	HE	31	1	15	16	12	—	—	—	—	—
2008–09	UMass-Lowell	HE	38	3	23	26	18	—	—	—	—	—
2009–10	UMass-Lowell	HE	34	6	15	21	22	—	—	—	—	—
2009–10	Norfolk Admirals	AHL	8	0	1	1	6	—	—	—	—	—
2010–11	Jokerit	SM-l	60	4	21	25	8	7	0	1	1	2
2011–12	Jokerit	SM-l	60	4	14	18	24	9	0	3	3	0
2012–13	Jokerit	SM-l	53	3	12	15	10	6	1	1	2	2
2013–14	Jokerit	Liiga	40	3	3	6	14	2	0	0	0	0
2014–15	EHC München	DEL	16	0	6	6	14	4	1	1	2	12
2015–16	EHC München	DEL	31	3	10	13	18	14	5	6	11	6
2016–17	Grizzlys Wolfsburg	DEL	45	6	19	25	14	18	2	7	9	6
2017–18	Grizzlys Wolfsburg	DEL	51	7	27	34	34	7	0	3	3	0
2018–19	Grizzlys Wolfsburg	DEL	51	4	23	27	12	—	—	—	—	—
2019–20	Florida Everblades	ECHL	10	1	4	5	6	—	—	—	—	—
2019–20	HIFK	Liiga	1	0	0	0	0	—	—	—	—	—
Liiga totals			214	14	50	64	56	24	1	5	6	4

== Awards and honors ==
Award	Year
College
All-Hockey East Second Team	2009–10
