= Likens =

Likens is a surname. Notable people with the surname include:

- Gene Likens (born 1935), American limnologist and ecologist
- Jeff Likens (born 1985), American ice hockey defenseman
- Rob Likens (born 1967), American football coach
- Sylvia Likens (1949–1965), American murder victim
