= Hinterstocker =

Hinterstocker is a German surname. Notable people with the surname include:

- Benjamin Hinterstocker (born 1979), German ice hockey coach
- Hermann Hinterstocker (born 1956), German ice hockey player
- Ludwig Hinterstocker (1931–2020), German footballer
- Martin Hinterstocker (disambiguation), multiple people
