= Marius Möchel =

German ice hockey player (born 1991)

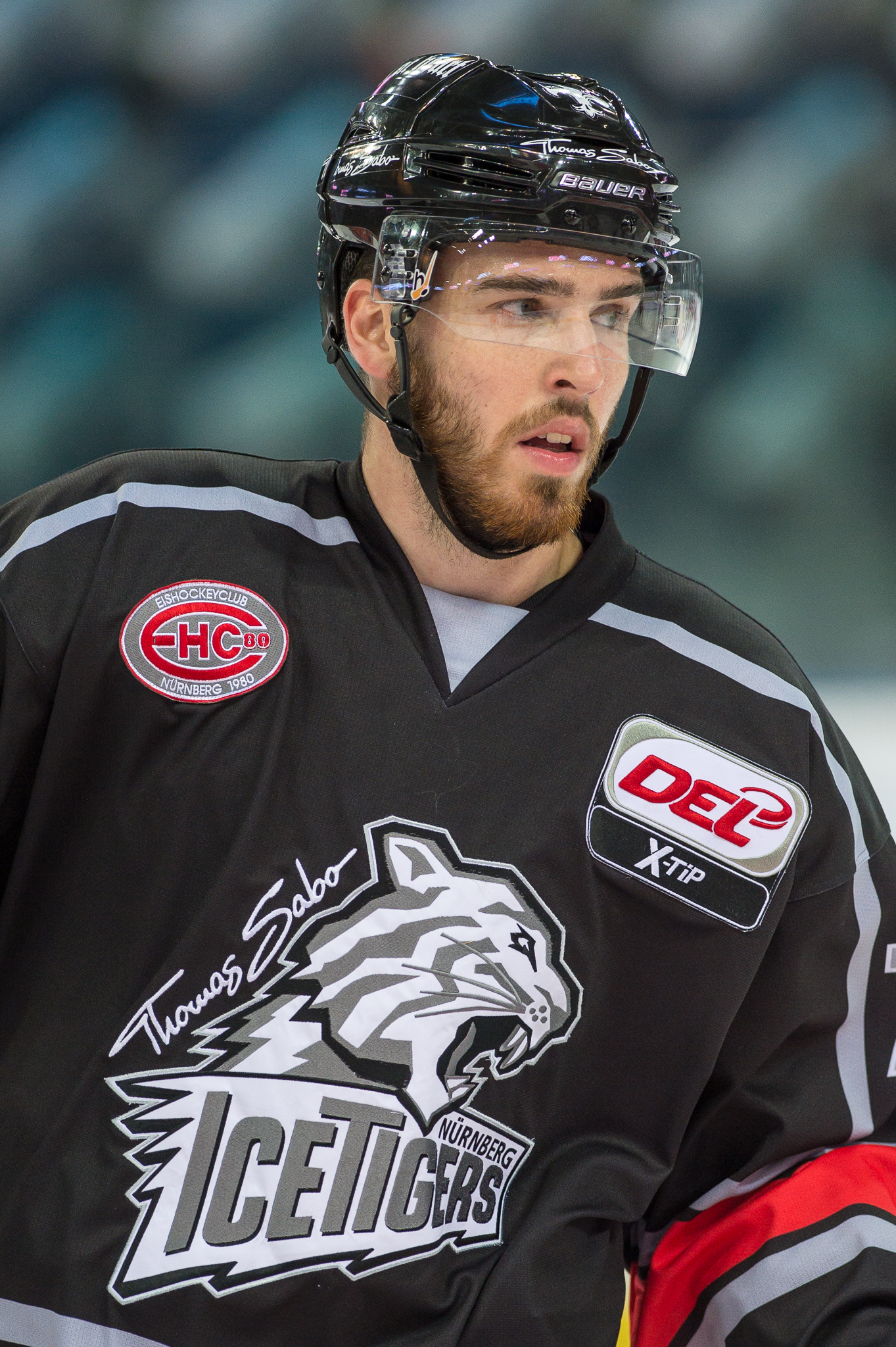
- Möchel playing for the Ice Tigers
- Born: May 28, 1991 (age 34) Nuremberg, Germany
- Height: 6 ft 3 in (191 cm)
- Weight: 187 lb (85 kg; 13 st 5 lb)
- Position: Forward, Defence
- Shoots: Left
- DEL2 team Former teams: Starbulls Rosenheim; EHC München; Hamburg Freezers; Thomas Sabo Ice Tigers; Grizzlys Wolfsburg; Schwenninger Wild Wings
- Playing career: 2011–present

Marius Möchel (born May 28, 1991) is a German professional ice hockey player. He is currently playing for the Starbulls Rosenheim of the DEL2 in Germany. He has formerly played in the DEL with EHC München, Hamburg Freezers, Thomas Sabo Ice Tigers, Grizzlys Wolfsburg and Schwenninger Wild Wings in the Deutsche Eishockey Liga (DEL).

After four seasons with the Ice Tigers, Möchel left following the 2017–18 campaign, signing a two-year contract with his fourth DEL club, in Grizzlys Wolfsburg, on April 17, 2018.
