= Mark Voakes =

Canadian ice hockey player

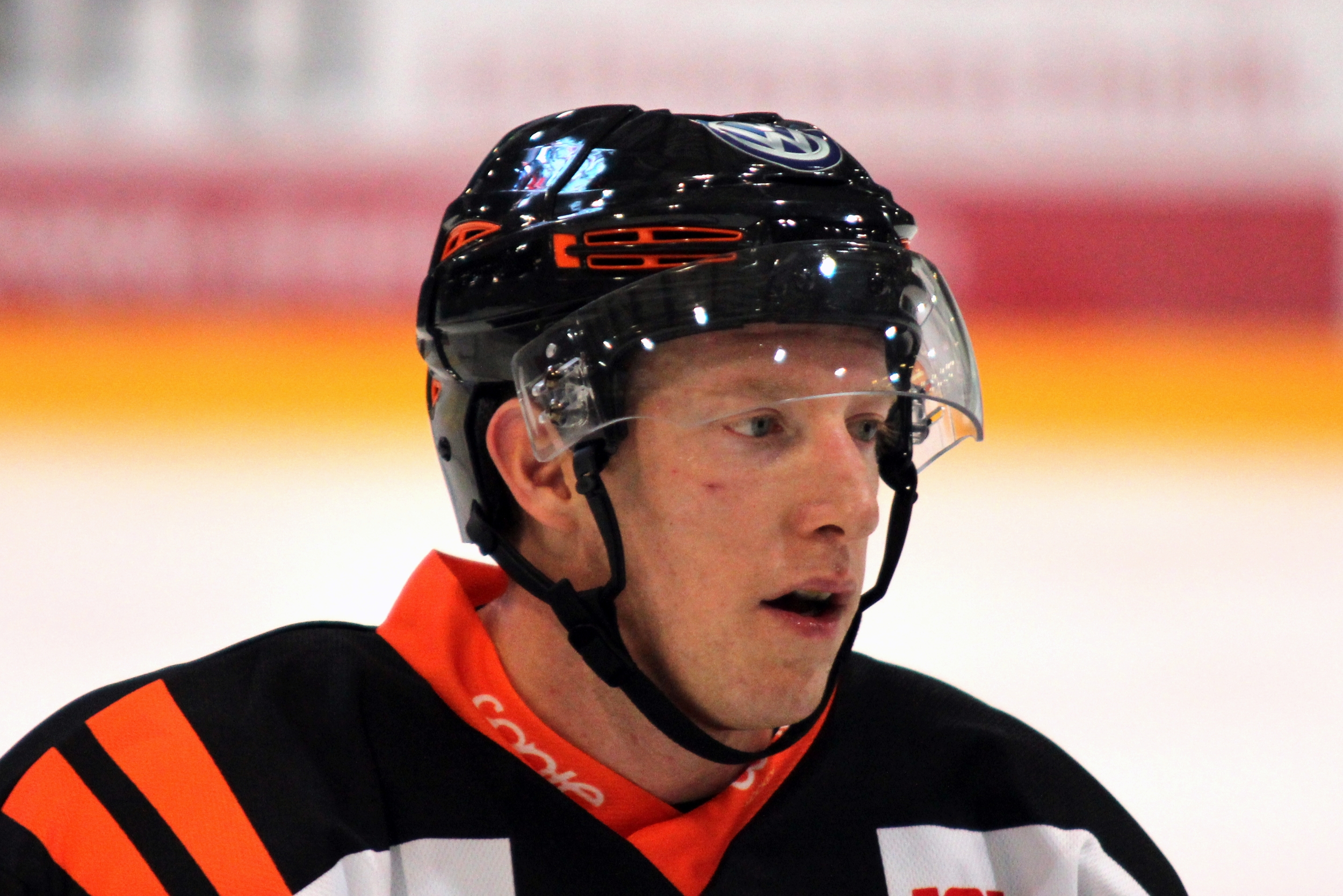
- Born: April 6, 1984 (age 41) St. Thomas, Ontario, Canada
- Height: 6 ft 0 in (183 cm)
- Weight: 181 lb (82 kg; 12 st 13 lb)
- Position: Centre
- Shot: Left
- Played for: Portland Pirates; Rochester Americans; Krefeld Pinguine; Grizzlys Wolfsburg; EHC München
- NHL draft: Undrafted
- Playing career: 2009–2021

Mark Voakes (born April 6, 1984) is a Canadian former professional ice hockey player. He most notably played in the Deutsche Eishockey Liga (DEL).

== Playing career ==
Prior to turning professional, Voakes attended Wilfrid Laurier University where he played four seasons of Canadian Interuniversity Sport hockey. During the summer of 2011, the Rochester Americans announced that they had signed Voakes to an American Hockey League contract.

On June 1, 2012, Voakes signed his first European contract on an initial one-year deal with Krefeld Pinguine of the German DEL. After two years with the Krefeld team, he signed with fellow DEL side EHC Wolfsburg prior to the 2014–15 campaign. In January 2016, he put pen to paper on a contract extension that will keep him at the club through the 2017–18 season.

On May 7, 2018, Voakes left Wolfsburg as a free agent and agreed to a one-year contract with reigning champions, EHC München.
