= Dragan Umicevic =

Swedish ice hockey player

Dragan Umičević
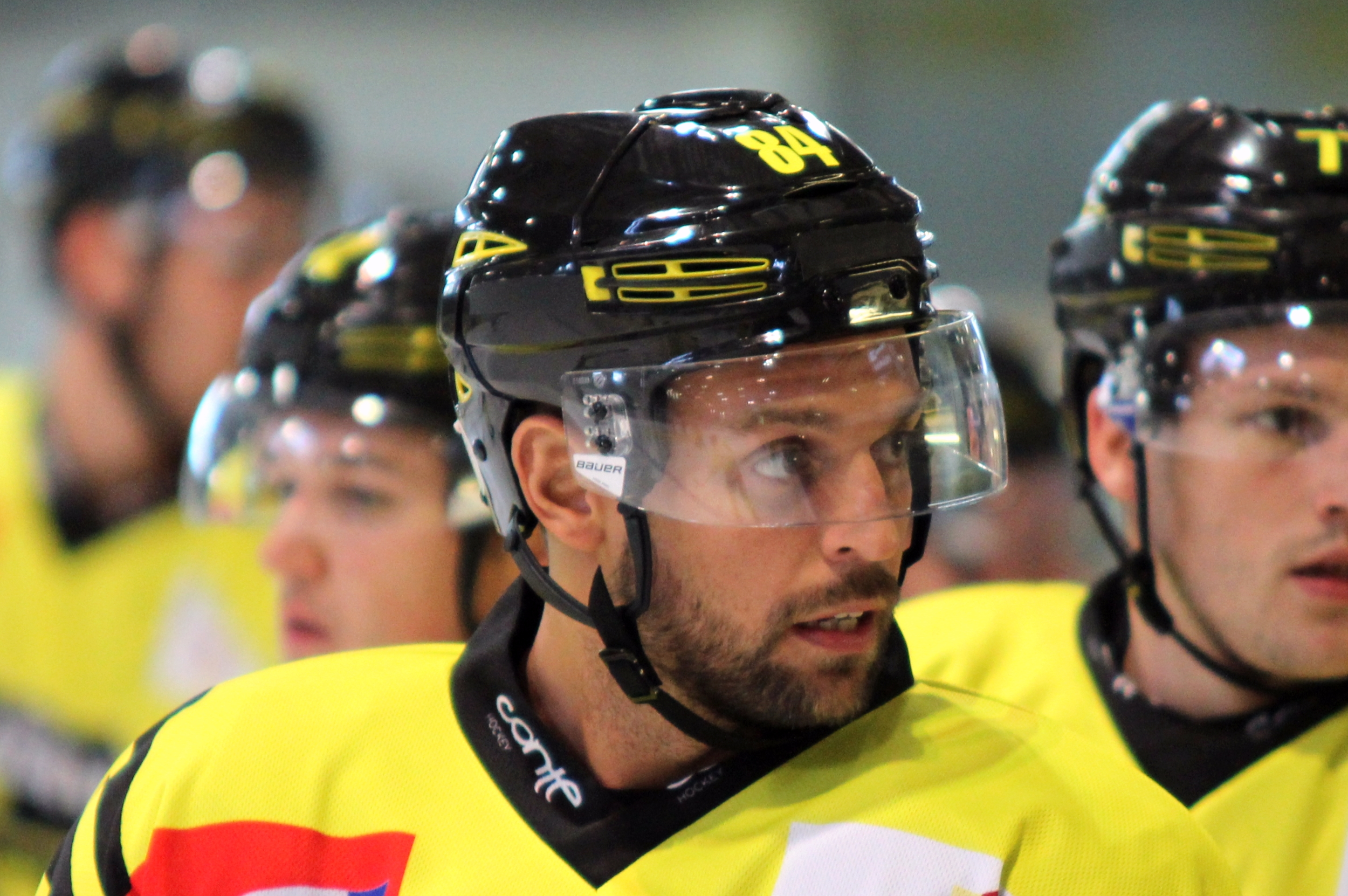
- Born: 9 October 1984 (age 41) Dubica, SR Bosnia and Herzegovina, SFR Yugoslavia
- Height: 6 ft 0 in (183 cm)
- Weight: 203 lb (92 kg; 14 st 7 lb)
- Position: Right Wing
- Shoots: Right
- Allsv team Former teams: Södertälje SK; Djurgårdens IF; CSKA Moscow; Färjestad BK; Frölunda HC; Ässät Pori; Tappara; EHC Biel; Kölner Haie; Krefeld Pinguine; Black Wings Linz
- NHL draft: 184th overall, 2003; Edmonton Oilers
- Playing career: 2001–present

Dragan Umičević (Serbian Cyrillic: Драган Умичевић; born 9 October 1984) is a Swedish professional ice hockey player of Serbian descent. He is currently playing for Södertälje SK in the HockeyAllsvenskan (Allsv). Umicevic has represented the Sweden national ice hockey team in 2006 and 2007. With Södertälje SK he won the team's internal scoring league in the 2008–09 Elitserien season. Umičević was drafted by the Edmonton Oilers in the sixth round of the 2003 NHL entry draft, 184th overall.

== Playing career ==
Aside from 9 games in Russia in 2007, Umicevic played in Sweden until 2012. He then moved to the Finnish SM-Liiga, where he was known as a playmaker.

At the end of the 2013–14 season he moved to the NLA in Switzerland and signed with EHC Biel for the playoffs. He scored 6 goals and 10 assists in 15 games, earning him a one-year contract with Biel for 2014-15.

For the 2015–16 season, Umicevic signed a one-year contract with the DEL team Kölner Haie. In August 2016, he signed a two-year deal with another German team, Krefeld Pinguine.

Following the 2017–18 season, Umicevic opted to leave as a free agent and sign a new two-year contract in the neighbouring EBEL with Austrian club Steinbach Black Wings Linz on May 1, 2018.

== Career statistics ==
=== Regular season and playoffs ===
| | | | Regular season | | | | | Playoffs |
| Season | Team | League | GP | G | A | Pts | PIM | GP | G | A | Pts | PIM |
|---|---|---|---|---|---|---|---|---|---|---|---|---|
| 2000–01 | Södertälje SK | J18 Allsv | 14 | 8 | 5 | 13 | 49 | 2 | 0 | 0 | 0 | 0 |
| 2000–01 | Södertälje SK | J20 | 1 | 0 | 0 | 0 | 0 | 3 | 0 | 1 | 1 | 2 |
| 2001–02 | Södertälje SK | J20 | 36 | 20 | 31 | 51 | 41 | 2 | 0 | 0 | 0 | 2 |
| 2001–02 | Södertälje SK | SEL | 3 | 1 | 0 | 1 | 0 | — | — | — | — | — |
| 2002–03 | Södertälje SK | J20 | 24 | 14 | 19 | 33 | 28 | — | — | — | — | — |
| 2002–03 | Södertälje SK | SEL | 22 | 2 | 3 | 5 | 4 | — | — | — | — | — |
| 2003–04 | Södertälje SK | J20 | 9 | 3 | 5 | 8 | 24 | — | — | — | — | — |
| 2003–04 | IF Björklöven | Allsv | 21 | 8 | 8 | 16 | 45 | — | — | — | — | — |
| 2004–05 | Södertälje SK | J20 | 4 | 2 | 9 | 11 | 4 | — | — | — | — | — |
| 2004–05 | Södertälje SK | SEL | 47 | 6 | 13 | 19 | 20 | 10 | 0 | 1 | 1 | 6 |
| 2005–06 | Södertälje SK | SEL | 43 | 6 | 16 | 22 | 14 | — | — | — | — | — |
| 2006–07 | Djurgårdens IF | SEL | 51 | 13 | 15 | 28 | 18 | — | — | — | — | — |
| 2007–08 | CSKA Moscow | RSL | 9 | 2 | 0 | 2 | 4 | — | — | — | — | — |
| 2007–08 | Södertälje SK | SEL | 39 | 10 | 7 | 17 | 28 | — | — | — | — | — |
| 2008–09 | Södertälje SK | SEL | 53 | 12 | 19 | 31 | 41 | — | — | — | — | — |
| 2009–10 | Färjestad BK | SEL | 55 | 11 | 25 | 36 | 30 | 7 | 3 | 3 | 6 | 0 |
| 2010–11 | Färjestad BK | SEL | 40 | 7 | 16 | 23 | 22 | — | — | — | — | — |
| 2010–11 | Frölunda HC | SEL | 3 | 0 | 0 | 0 | 0 | — | — | — | — | — |
| 2011–12 | Malmö Redhawks | Allsv | 43 | 5 | 23 | 28 | 28 | 6 | 3 | 6 | 9 | 2 |
| 2012–13 | Ässät | SM-l | 9 | 1 | 5 | 6 | 0 | — | — | — | — | — |
| 2012–13 | Tappara | SM-l | 12 | 3 | 5 | 8 | 4 | 15 | 0 | 9 | 9 | 33 |
| 2013–14 | Ässät | Liiga | 52 | 5 | 33 | 38 | 16 | — | — | — | — | — |
| 2013–14 | EHC Biel | NLA | 3 | 2 | 2 | 4 | 0 | — | — | — | — | — |
| 2014–15 | EHC Biel | NLA | 44 | 10 | 20 | 30 | 26 | 1 | 0 | 0 | 0 | 0 |
| 2015–16 | Kölner Haie | DEL | 47 | 7 | 35 | 42 | 20 | 15 | 2 | 9 | 11 | 8 |
| 2016–17 | Krefeld Pinguine | DEL | 44 | 11 | 19 | 30 | 12 | — | — | — | — | — |
| 2017–18 | Krefeld Pinguine | DEL | 40 | 9 | 31 | 40 | 12 | — | — | — | — | — |
| 2018–19 | EHC Black Wings Linz | EBEL | 50 | 11 | 28 | 39 | 6 | 6 | 1 | 2 | 3 | 0 |
| 2019–20 | EHC Black Wings Linz | EBEL | 50 | 13 | 52 | 65 | 24 | 3 | 0 | 6 | 6 | 4 |
| 2020–21 | Black Wings 1992 | ICEHL | 47 | 14 | 50 | 64 | 26 | — | — | — | — | — |
| 2021–22 | Black Wings Linz | ICEHL | 18 | 3 | 14 | 17 | 4 | — | — | — | — | — |
| 2021–22 | Södertälje SK | Allsv | 17 | 2 | 5 | 7 | 39 | — | — | — | — | — |
| SEL totals | | | 364 | 68 | 114 | 182 | 177 | 17 | 3 | 4 | 7 | 6 |
| DEL totals | | | 131 | 27 | 85 | 112 | 44 | 15 | 2 | 9 | 11 | 8 |
| ICEHL totals | | | 165 | 41 | 144 | 185 | 60 | 9 | 1 | 8 | 9 | 4 |

=== International ===
| Year | Team | Event | GP | G | A | Pts | PIM |
|---|---|---|---|---|---|---|---|
| 2002 | Sweden | WJC18 | 8 | 2 | 1 | 3 | 8 |
| Junior totals | | | 8 | 2 | 1 | 3 | 8 |
