= Steve Pinizzotto =

Canadian ice hockey player

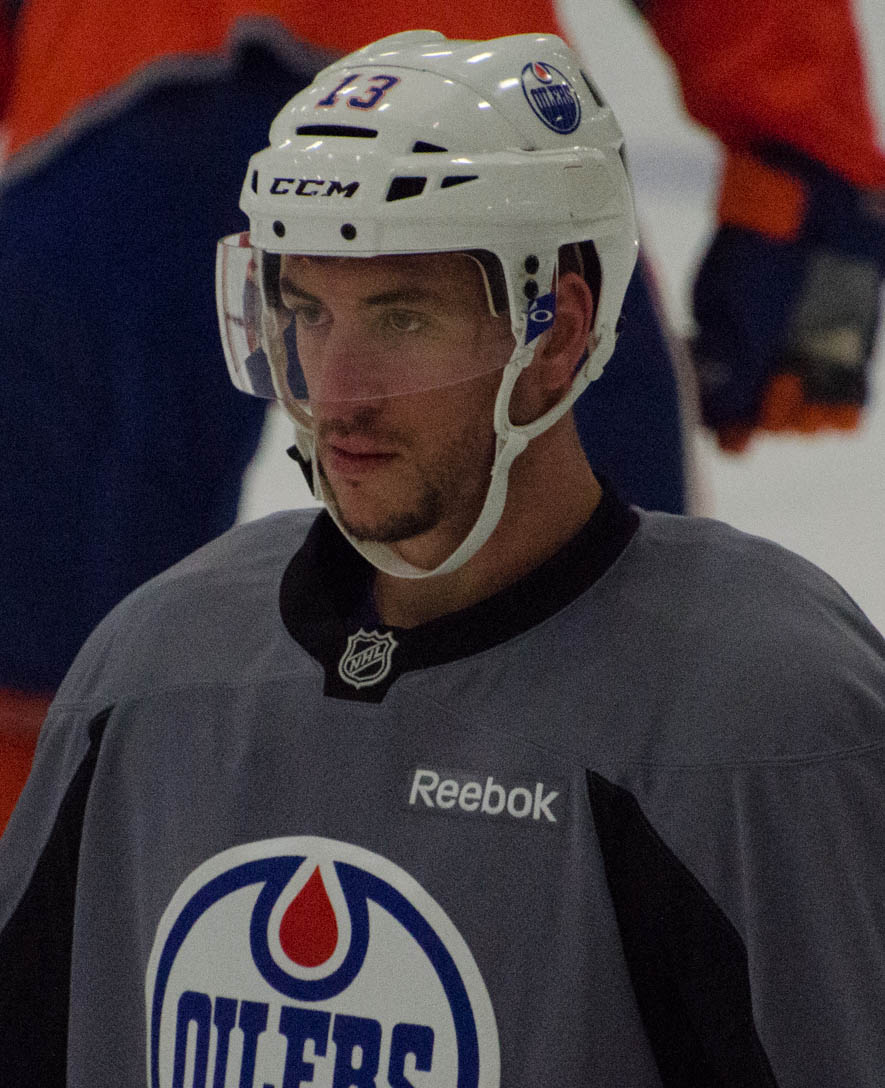
- Pinizzotto with the Edmonton Oilers
- Born: April 26, 1984 (age 42) Toronto, Ontario, Canada
- Height: 6 ft 1 in (185 cm)
- Weight: 205 lb (93 kg; 14 st 9 lb)
- Position: Right wing
- Shot: Right
- Played for: Vancouver Canucks; Edmonton Oilers; EHC München; Kölner Haie
- NHL draft: Undrafted
- Playing career: 2007–2019

Steven Pinizzotto (born April 26, 1984) is a Canadian former professional ice hockey right winger who played in the National Hockey League (NHL) with the Vancouver Canucks and the Edmonton Oilers.

== Playing career ==
=== Junior and college ===
In 2000–01, Pinizzotto joined with the Ontario Provincial Junior Hockey League (OPJHL) Oakville Blades. He was a late bloomer, having missed the OHL Draft due to his small size (he was only 5'7" at the time). He stayed with the team for 4 seasons, leading them to the West Division championship in 2003–2004. In 2004–05 Pinizzotto was named team captain and Most Valuable Player of the Year, leading in scoring with 33 goals and 62 assists for a total of 95 points. Pinizzotto recorded 78 goals, 137 assists, 215 points over 170 games, 457 penalty minutes, and led the team with the best plus-minus rating during his tenure with the Blades. It was enough for Tigers coach Wayne Wilson of the Rochester Institute of Technology to offer Pinizzotto an NCAA scholarship for ice hockey.

In 2005–06, Pinizzotto joined the Rochester Institute of Technology (RIT) Tigers of the NCAA Independent Conference, where he recorded 7 goals and 6 assists in 20 games. His next season, 2006–07 RIT joined the Atlantic Hockey conference, since the program moved to the NCAA Division I level, Pinizzotto recorded 13 goals and 31 assists in 34 games.

In 2006–07, Pinizzotto led the RIT team with 44 points on 13 goals and 31 assists in only 34 games and 76 penalty minutes. He was fifth in the country with 0.91 assists per game and 12th in all of Division I, averaging 1.29 points per contest. RIT won the Atlantic Hockey regular season championship with a Tiger offense and power play finishing second overall in the nation. Pinizzotto scored eight goals and added 17 assists on the power play. Pinizzotto was the team leader and among the RIT Division I leaders, recording 22 goals and 40 assists for 62 points in 58 career games for RIT, and known to be dangerous on the power play.

=== Hershey Bears ===
In March 2007, after playing only 2 years with RIT, Pinizzotto became the first RIT ice hockey player to sign a National Hockey League (NHL) contract shortly after RIT Coach Wayne Wilson told Pinizzotto to call Steve Richmond of the Washington Capitals He signed a two-year entry-level contract with the Washington Capitals in March 2007. In later years Pinizzotto played with and against the Vancouver Canucks' Chris Tanev, also an RIT alum. Beginning the 2007–08 season with the Washington Capitals' ECHL farm team, the South Carolina Stingrays where recorded 15 goals, 17 assists for 32 points in 40 games and 58 penalty minutes.

In 2009–10, Pinizzotto played a full season with the Hershey Bears American Hockey League (AHL) picking up 41 points (13–28–41). He was a team-best plus-40 with 124 penalty minutes in 69 regular season games Pinizzotto would go on to help the Hershey Bears win the Calder Cup two years in a row.

In March 2009, Pinizzotto was called up to the Capitals as an injury reserve. Despite taking part in the pre-game warmup against the Toronto Maple Leafs on March 23, he remained on standby. By the latter part of the season was sent back to Hershey, without appearing for the Capitals, and remained for duration of the season.

=== Vancouver Canucks ===
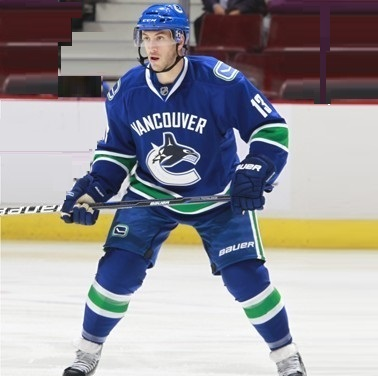
With the Vancouver Canucks

On July 3, 2011, Pinizzotto signed a one-year, two-way deal ($600,000) with the Vancouver Canucks after receiving contract offers from 9 other NHL teams. Pinizzotto was slated to fill a 4th line spot with the Canucks right out of training camp. The Canucks saw him as a Raffi Torres replacement. His combination of physicality, puck-handling ability, scoring, skating well, finishing checks, going hard to the net, and defensive ability impressed coach Alain Vigneault. He recorded a 2-assist, 5-hit effort in a preseason home opener against the Calgary Flames, and finished the preseason tied for the highest plus/minus on the team at plus-3 and 5 points in 4 games. Pinizzotto, who made the team out of training camp, suffered a left shoulder injury on an ill-timed hit on Douglas Murray during their last preseason game against the San Jose Sharks on September 25, 2011. His shoulder was popped back into place but after being on IR for 6 weeks, he tweaked his shoulder in practice just before a team road trip. Pinizzotto's injury caused him to miss the entire season. In his absence Vancouver claimed Dale Weise on waivers.

On July 2, 2012, Pinizzotto re-signed with the Canucks. During the 2012 NHL lockout, he was assigned to the Chicago Wolves where he tallied four goals, eight assists, and 29 penalty minutes in 24 games. Pinizzotto was lauded for being a strong skater, going hard to the net, and his heavy shot. His offensive side, strong penalty-killing skills, and aggressive play also attracted attention.

At the minor league level, Pinizzotto consistently showed grit and strong two-way play with a combination of physicality and scoring, tallying 38 goals, 72 assists, 110 points, and 408 penalty minutes in his 234 career AHL games with Chicago and Hershey. With Hershey, he was a strong contributor to their 2009 and 2010 Calder Cup Championship.

Vancouver protected Pinizzotto, believing with a high degree of probability he would be picked up on waivers. On March 13, 2013, Pinizzotto was headed to Vancouver for his NHL opportunity. He was a sought-after commodity when he signed with Vancouver and always attracted a lot of interest for his grit, tenacity, and decent skill level. The Canucks were anxious to get Pinizzotto back into their lineup and bring a physical presence to the game.

Pinizzotto made his NHL debut on March 14, 2013, against the Nashville Predators after travelling all day, arriving from Chicago just hours before game time. In his first shift of the game, he sent Nashville's Kevin Klein crashing to the ice with a big hit, leading to a fight with the defenceman.

=== Edmonton Oilers and Florida Panthers ===
On August 4, 2013, Pinizzotto was signed by the Florida Panthers to a one-year, two-way deal. Following training camp, Pinizzotto played 21 games for Florida's AHL affiliate, the San Antonio Rampage, where he scored 7 points (6–1–7) and racked up 67 penalty minutes. Pinizzotto became known on the team for his work ethic and perseverance.

On January 17, 2014, the Panthers traded Pinizzotto (along with Jack Combs) to the Edmonton Oilers in exchange for Derek Nesbitt and Ryan Martindale. Sent to the Oilers' minor-league affiliate in Oklahoma City, Pinizzotto impressed Oklahoma City Barons coach Todd Nelson with his hard-nosed two-way style and energy.

In April 2014, the 6'1", 205-pound forward got a call from the Edmonton Oilers to play wing. The 29-year-old veteran had already made a strong presence in the NHL, having had 12 games with 29 penalty minutes for Vancouver, while adding a physical dimension with skill. Pinizzotto impressed the Oilers in his first game with the organization. With his work ethic and penalty-kill abilities, Pinizzotto was called up to play 6 games with the Oilers. He played six games with the Oilers, and recorded his first two NHL points and 15 penalty minutes.

On June 12, 2014, Pinizzotto was re-signed by the Oilers to a one-year extension. Pinizzotto had a strong camp and played 4 pre-season games, scoring 2 points, recording 21 penalty minutes, and finishing +2, earning a roster spot after the last round of cuts.

On November 17, 2014, Pinizzotto was called up by the Oilers from their AHL affiliate, the Oklahoma City Barons. Pinizzotto made his 2014–15 season debut on November 19, 2014, against his previous team, the Vancouver Canucks, with a Gordie Howe hat trick. At 2:27 into the game, Pinizzotto dropped his gloves with Derek Dorsett, then less than 5 minutes into the second period, Pinizzotto scored his 1st NHL goal when he beat Ryan Miller with a wrist shot from the top of the faceoff circle to open the scoring for the Oilers. Pinizzotto finalized the Gordie Howe hat trick when he assisted on Boyd Gordon’s goal. On Hockey Night in Canada Coach's Corner intermission show, Don Cherry and Ron MacLean broadcast the replay of Pinizzotto's Gordie Howe hat trick, as did multiple broadcasters.

=== DEL ===
On May 26, 2015, Pinizzotto, an impending free agent, opted to sign his first contract abroad, agreeing to a three-year deal with EHC München of the German league Deutsche Eishockey Liga (DEL).

Pinizzotto claimed the DEL championship in each of his three seasons in Munich, before leaving after his contract. On June 13, 2018, Pinizzotto opted to continue his career in Germany, agreeing to a one-year contract with Kölner Haie for the 2018–19 season.

== Playing style ==
Pinizzotto was known as an energy winger, known for his physicality, puck-handling ability, and scoring, skating well, finishing checks, going hard to the net, and defensive ability. Pinizzotto missed the 2011–12 season with the Canucks. He was a hardworking, gritty, two-way player with a combination of physicality and scoring, having 38 goals, 72 assists, 110 points, and 408 penalty minutes in his 234 career AHL games with Chicago and Hershey, where he was a strong contributor for their 2009 and 2010 Calder Cup Championships.

== Personal life ==
Pinizzotto was born in Toronto, Ontario to Linda and Leo Pinizzotto. He has Canadian and German dual citizenship because his mother, who though born in Canada is of German descent. She is a real estate agent in Mississauga, Ontario. His father is Italian. Pinizzotto has two older brothers, Jason, an Ontario Hockey League (OHL) third-round draft pick for the Barrie Colts and professional hockey player for the SC Bietigheim-Bissingen in Germany, and Marc, who played pro hockey for the Black Dragons Erfurt in Thüringen, Germany.

Pinizzotto credits his strong dedication to hockey to his family. He grew up in Mississauga but played his minor hockey within the Greater Toronto Hockey League, competing with the Toronto Red Wings and Toronto Marlboros with stars like Rick Nash, David Clarkson, and Chris Campoli. He also excelled in AAA rep baseball, playing for the Ontario Baseball Association (OBA). After graduating from high school at Lorne Park Secondary School, and competing in junior hockey, Pinizzotto received a hockey scholarship to the Rochester Institute of Technology, where he studied packaging design while playing college hockey.

In 2000, Pinizzotto was invited to appear in a Nike Hockey commercial at the age of 17. Markus Näslund, former Vancouver Canucks star, and Ilya Kovalchuk, the first overall pick in the 2001 NHL Entry Draft for the Atlanta Thrashers, starred in the commercial. Pinizzotto can be seen in the centre front of the scene when the Zamboni gates open with Näslund and Kovalchuk.

On June 11th, 2026, Marc, while serving as police constable serving with the Toronto Police Service Emergency Task Force, was shot and killed by a gunman during a search warrant connected to racial and anti-semetic shootings across North America. Both Pinizzotto brothers, joined by the rest of the Pinizzotto family, law enforcement and first responders from across the world, paid tribute to Marc, on June 24th, 2026, 13 days after the shooting. The city of Mississauga, Ontario dedicated a park to Marc in the area where he grew up.

== Career statistics ==
			Regular season					Playoffs
Season	Team	League	GP	G	A	Pts	PIM	GP	G	A	Pts	PIM
2000–01	Oakville Blades	OPJHL	5	2	1	3	2	—	—	—	—	—
2001–02	Oakville Blades	OPJHL	34	10	16	26	40	—	—	—	—	—
2002–03	Oakville Blades	OPJHL	44	16	24	40	152	—	—	—	—	—
2003–04	Oakville Blades	OPJHL	39	17	34	51	177	—	—	—	—	—
2004–05	Oakville Blades	OPJHL	48	33	62	95	86	—	—	—	—	—
2005–06	RIT Tigers	NCAA Indep.	20	7	6	13	32	—	—	—	—	—
2006–07	RIT Tigers	AHA	34	13	31	44	76	—	—	—	—	—
2006–07	Hershey Bears	AHL	5	0	0	0	4	—	—	—	—	—
2007–08	South Carolina Stingrays	ECHL	40	15	17	32	58	10	1	2	3	34
2007–08	Hershey Bears	AHL	23	0	4	4	12	5	0	0	0	13
2008–09	Hershey Bears	AHL	45	4	7	11	61	21	3	2	5	28
2008–09	South Carolina Stingrays	ECHL	11	4	6	10	19	—	—	—	—	—
2009–10	Hershey Bears	AHL	69	13	28	41	124	21	5	3	8	33
2010–11	Hershey Bears	AHL	68	17	25	42	178	6	2	2	4	6
2012–13	Chicago Wolves	AHL	24	4	8	12	29	—	—	—	—	—
2012–13	Vancouver Canucks	NHL	12	0	0	0	29	1	0	0	0	0
2013–14	San Antonio Rampage	AHL	21	6	1	7	67	—	—	—	—	—
2013–14	Oklahoma City Barons	AHL	30	6	12	18	116	1	0	0	0	14
2013–14	Edmonton Oilers	NHL	6	0	2	2	15	—	—	—	—	—
2014–15	Oklahoma City Barons	AHL	25	1	10	11	117	—	—	—	—	—
2014–15	Edmonton Oilers	NHL	18	2	2	4	30	—	—	—	—	—
2015–16	EHC München	DEL	42	13	5	18	151	13	4	12	16	66
2016–17	EHC München	DEL	26	4	13	17	114	9	2	2	4	49
2017–18	EHC München	DEL	39	13	17	30	100	12	3	5	8	20
2018–19	Kölner Haie	DEL	17	3	3	6	34	—	—	—	—	—
NHL totals			36	2	4	6	74	1	0	0	0	0

== Awards and honors ==
Award	Year
Oakville Blades MVP	2005–06
