= Martin Hinterstocker (ice hockey, born 1989) =

German ice hockey player

- Born: 3 September 1989 (age 36) Garmisch-Partenkirchen, West Germany
- Height: 6 ft 0 in (183 cm)
- Weight: 181 lb (82 kg; 12 st 13 lb)
- Position: Left wing
- Shot: Left
- Played for: DEG Metro Stars; EHC München; Augsburger Panther; Straubing Tigers
- Playing career: 2006–2016

Martin Hinterstocker (born 3 September 1989) is a German professional ice hockey forward who currently plays for the Straubing Tigers in the Deutsche Eishockey Liga (DEL). He joined the Augsburger Panther from EHC Red Bull München during the 2014–15 season. He then signed as a free agent to a one-year deal with the Straubing Tigers on 3 June 2015.

== Career statistics ==
=== Regular season and playoffs ===
			Regular season					Playoffs
Season	Team	League	GP	G	A	Pts	PIM	GP	G	A	Pts	PIM
2005–06	Starbulls Rosenheim	3.GBun	2	0	1	1	2	—	—	—	—	—
2006–07	Starbulls Rosenheim	3.GBun	19	2	4	6	4	—	—	—	—	—
2007–08	DEG Metro Stars	DEL	35	0	1	1	2	—	—	—	—	—
2007–08	ESC Moskitos Essen	2.GBun	14	1	0	1	4	6	0	1	1	2
2007–08	DEG Eishockey II	4.GBun	5	4	8	12	4	3	3	0	3	2
2008–09	DEG Metro Stars	DEL	50	0	2	2	8	12	0	0	0	0
2008–09	EHC München	2.GBun	1	0	1	1	16	—	—	—	—	—
2009–10	DEG Metro Stars	DEL	40	1	2	3	0	3	0	1	1	0
2010–11	DEG Metro Stars	DEL	52	2	4	6	8	9	0	0	0	0
2011–12	DEG Metro Stars	DEL	49	0	6	6	8	7	0	0	0	2
2012–13	EHC München	DEL	50	7	13	20	16	—	—	—	—	—
2013–14	EHC München	DEL	21	4	6	10	4	—	—	—	—	—
2014–15	EHC München	DEL	2	0	0	0	2	—	—	—	—	—
2014–15	Augsburger Panther	DEL	38	3	0	3	20	—	—	—	—	—
DEL totals			337	17	34	51	68	31	0	1	1	2

=== International ===
Year	Team	Event	Result	GP	G	A	Pts	PIM
2007	Germany	WJC18	8th	6	0	1	1	0
Junior totals				6	0	1	1	0
