= Martin Hinterstocker =

Martin Hinterstocker may refer to:

- Martin Hinterstocker (ice hockey, born 1954), bronze medalist at the 1976 Winter Olympics for West Germany
- Martin Hinterstocker (ice hockey, born 1989), participated 2007 IIHF World U18 Championships for Germany
