= Youri Ziffzer =

German ice hockey player

Yuri Ziffzer
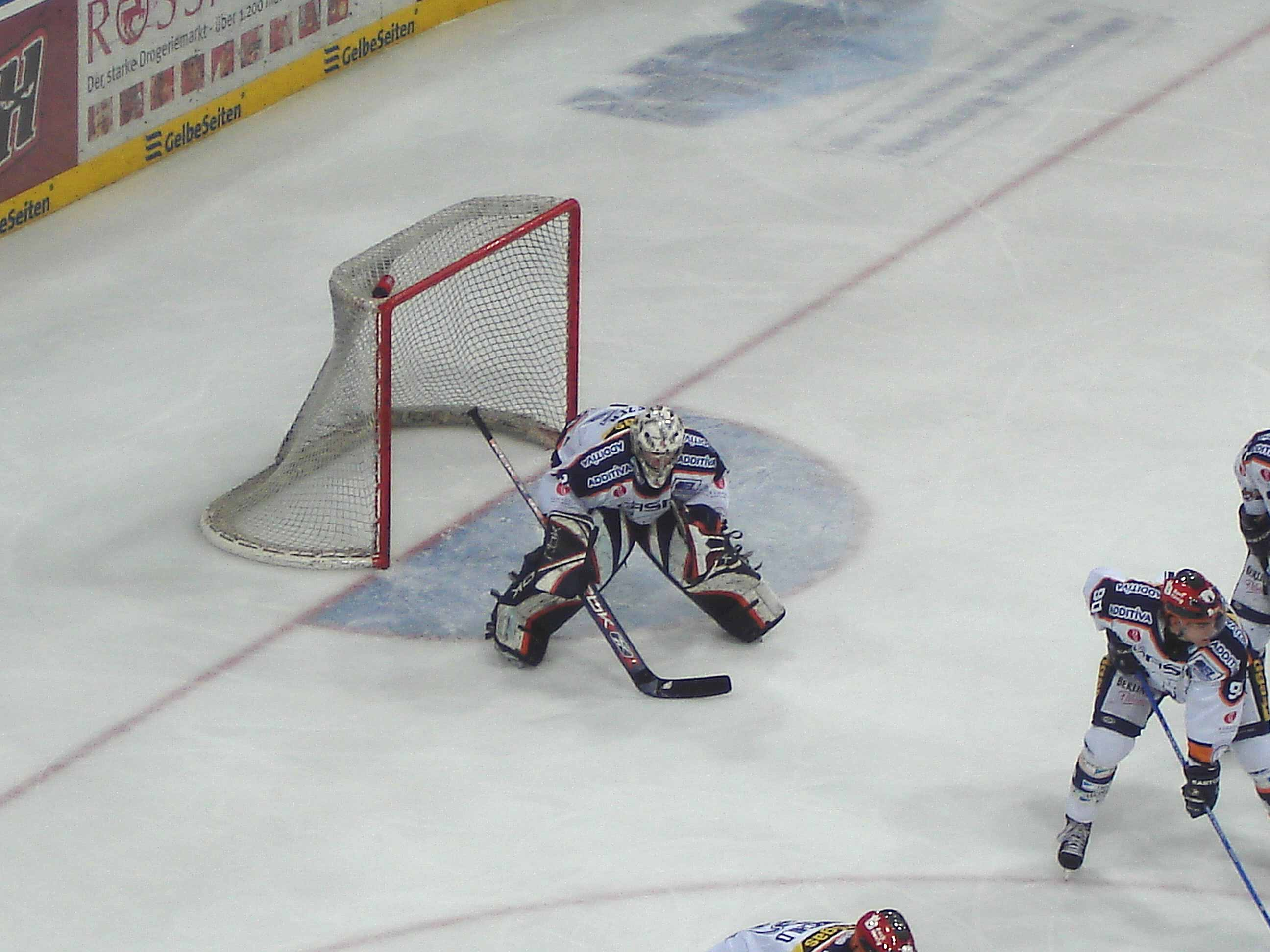
- Born: 21 August 1986 (age 39) Singapore, Singapore
- Height: 6 ft 2 in (188 cm)
- Weight: 187 lb (85 kg; 13 st 5 lb)
- Position: Goalie
- Caught: Left
- Played for: Eisbären Berlin; Hamburg Freezers; Hannover Scorpions; Kölner Haie; Adler Mannheim
- Playing career: 2003–2017

Youri Ziffzer (born 21 August 1986) is a German ice hockey executive and former professional ice hockey goaltender who is currently an assistant general manager for Adler Mannheim in the Deutsche Eishockey Liga (DEL). He previously played three seasons with Kölner Haie before signing as a free agent with Mannheim on May 2, 2014.
