= Gustaf Wesslau =

Swedish ice hockey player

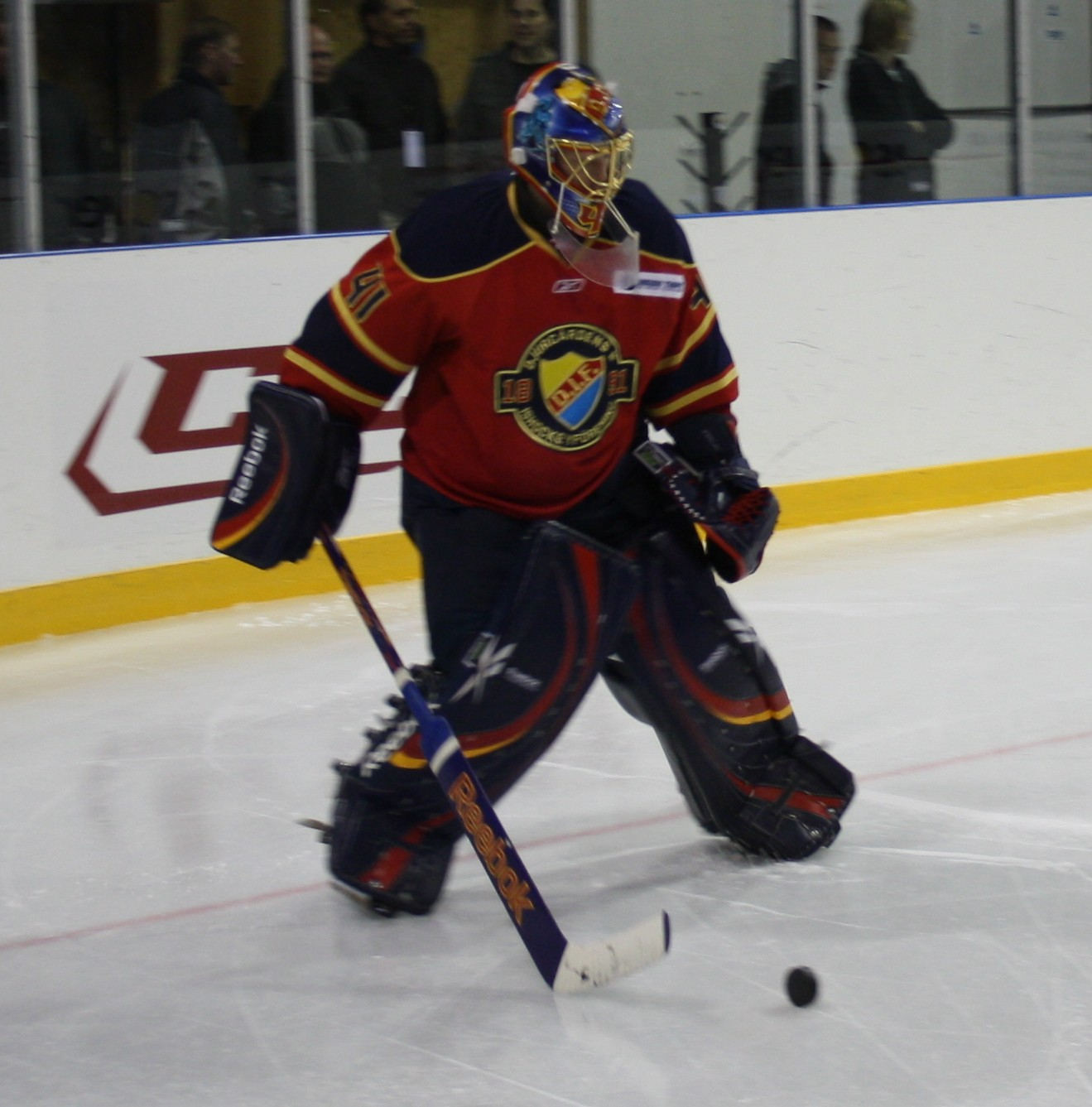
- Gustaf Wesslau playing for Djurgårdens IF during the 2009 Nordic Trophy tournament
- Born: February 5, 1985 (age 41) Upplands Väsby, Sweden
- Height: 6 ft 4 in (193 cm)
- Weight: 194 lb (88 kg; 13 st 12 lb)
- Position: Goaltender
- Catches: Left
- team Former teams: Free Agent; Malmö Redhawks; Djurgårdens IF; Springfield Falcons; HV71; Kölner Haie
- NHL draft: Undrafted
- Playing career: 2008–present

Gustaf Wesslau (born February 5, 1985) is a Swedish professional ice hockey goaltender who is currently an unrestricted free agent. He most recently played for Kölner Haie in the Deutsche Eishockey Liga (DEL).

== Playing career ==
Wesslau is a product of AIK, a club near the capital city of Stockholm. He represented his country at all youth team levels from U16 to U20 and made his debut on AIK's men's team during the 2003–04 season. He later played for other teams of the first and second division in Sweden, including the Malmö Redhawks, Almtuna IS, Borås HC and Djurgårdens IF.

He was signed by the Columbus Blue Jackets of the National Hockey League (NHL) on May 5, 2010, to a one-year, two-way NHL-American Hockey League contract and played 31 games in the American Hockey League for the Springfield Falcons, then the affiliate of the Blue Jackets.

Wesslau returned to Djurgården on May 2, 2011 and later signed a three-year deal with HV71 in 2012.

At the conclusion of his contract with HV71, having appeared in 132 regular season games as the club's starting goaltender, Wesslau left as a free agent to sign a one-year contract in Germany with Kölner Haie of the Deutsche Eishockey Liga (DEL) on March 26, 2015. In December 2015, he was handed a contract extension through 2018. He received 2016-17 DEL Regular Season Goaltender of the Year honors.
