= 2010–11 DEL season =

2010–11 Deutsche Eishockey Liga season
- League: Deutsche Eishockey Liga
- Sport: Ice Hockey
- Teams: 14

Regular season
- Season champions: Grizzly Adams Wolfsburg
- Top scorer: Darin Olver

Finals
- Champions: Eisbären Berlin

DEL seasons
- ← 2009–10 2011–12 →

The 2010–11 Deutsche Eishockey Liga season is the 17th season since the founding of the Deutsche Eishockey Liga (English: German Ice Hockey League). As reigning champions of the 2. Bundesliga, EHC München were promoted to the DEL.

Prior to the season, the league was plagued by financial uncertainty and as a result the two Hesse teams, the Kassel Huskies and Frankfurt Lions, lost their licenses through insolvency.

== Teams ==
Teams of the 2010–11 DEL season

Team	City	Arena
Augsburger Panther	Augsburg	Curt Frenzel Stadium
Eisbären Berlin	Berlin	O2 World
DEG Metro Stars	Düsseldorf	ISS Dome
Hamburg Freezers	Hamburg	Color Line Arena
Hannover Scorpions	Hanover	TUI Arena
ERC Ingolstadt	Ingolstadt	Saturn Arena
Iserlohn Roosters	Iserlohn	Eissporthalle Iserlohn
Kölner Haie	Cologne	Lanxess Arena
Krefeld Pinguine	Krefeld	König Palast
Adler Mannheim	Mannheim	SAP Arena
Thomas Sabo Ice Tigers	Nuremberg	Nuremberg Arena
Straubing Tigers	Straubing	Eisstadion am Pulverturm
Wolfsburg Grizzly Adams	Wolfsburg	Eisarena Wolfsburg
EHC München	Munich	Olympia Eishalle

== Regular season ==
	Team	GP	W	OTW	SOW	OTL	SOL	L	Goals	Points
1.	Grizzly Adams Wolfsburg	52	26	3	2	2	6	13	156:116	96
2.	DEG Metro Stars	52	26	3	3	1	2	17	174:158	93
3.	Eisbären Berlin	52	24	1	5	1	5	16	161:138	90
4.	Krefeld Pinguine	52	23	0	4	3	6	16	143:130	86
5.	Hannover Scorpions	52	24	1	1	4	1	21	154:160	81
6.	ERC Ingolstadt	52	19	6	3	1	3	20	153:143	79
7.	Adler Mannheim	52	20	2	5	4	1	20	131:137	79
8.	EHC München	52	18	4	4	2	4	20	163:161	76
9.	Kölner Haie	52	16	3	6	1	6	20	159:162	73
10.	Thomas Sabo Ice Tigers	52	20	2	2	2	2	24	138:165	72
11.	Hamburg Freezers	52	15	4	4	3	5	21	135:161	69
12.	Iserlohn Roosters	52	17	1	3	5	4	22	150:159	68
13.	Straubing Tigers	52	15	5	4	3	1	24	145:159	67
14.	Augsburger Panther	52	16	0	4	3	4	25	162:175	63

GP = Games Played, W = Wins, OTW = Overtime win, SOW = Shootout win, OTL = Overtime loss, SOL = Shootout loss, L = Loss
Color code: = Direct Playoff qualification, = Playoff qualification round, = No playoff

== Playoffs ==
=== Playoff qualifications ===
The playoff qualifications were played between March 16 and 18, 2011 in the Best-of-three mode.

			Series	1	2	3
Adler Mannheim	–	Thomas Sabo Ice Tigers	2:0	3:2	3:2	–
EHC München	–	Kölner Haie	0:2	3:4 3OT	3:4	–

OT = Overtime

=== Playoff brackets ===
Quarterfinals
1.	Grizzly Adams Wolfsburg	3
9.	Kölner Haie	0
4.	Krefeld Pinguine	3
5.	Hannover Scorpions	2
2.	DEG Metro Stars	3
7.	Adler Mannheim	1
3.	Eisbären Berlin	3
6.	ERC Ingolstadt	1

Semifinals
1.	Grizzly Adams Wolfsburg	3
4.	Krefeld Pinguine	0
2.	DEG Metro Stars	2
3.	Eisbären Berlin	3

Finals
1.	Grizzly Adams Wolfsburg	0
3.	Eisbären Berlin	3

=== Quarterfinals ===
The quarterfinals were played in the Best-of-five mode starting March 23 until March 31.

			Series	1	2	3	4	5
Grizzly Adams Wolfsburg	–	Kölner Haie	3:0	4:1	5:1	4:2	−	−
DEG Metro Stars	–	Adler Mannheim	3:1	2:7	3:2	1:0	5:2	−
Eisbären Berlin	–	ERC Ingolstadt	3:1	5:3	4:3	2:3	4:1	−
Krefeld Pinguine	–	Hannover Scorpions	3:2	6:4	3:5	3:4 OT	3:2	5:1

=== Semifinals ===
The semifinals were played in the Best-of-five mode, from April 3 to April 12, 2011.

			Series	1	2	3	4	5
Grizzly Adams Wolfsburg	–	Krefeld Pinguine	3:0	4:2	4:3 OT	2:1 2OT	–	−
DEG Metro Stars	–	Eisbären Berlin	2:3	3:2 OT	1:5	4:2	3:4 OT	1:3

=== Finals ===
The finals were played in the Best-of-five mode, from April 14 to April 19, 2011.

			Series	1	2	3	4	5
Grizzly Adams Wolfsburg	–	Eisbären Berlin	0:3	2:4	4:5	4:5	–	–

The Eisbären Berlin won the title for the 5th time.
