= Eis Arena Wolfsburg =

Arena in Wolfsburg, Germany

Coordinates: 52°26′14″N 10°48′51″E

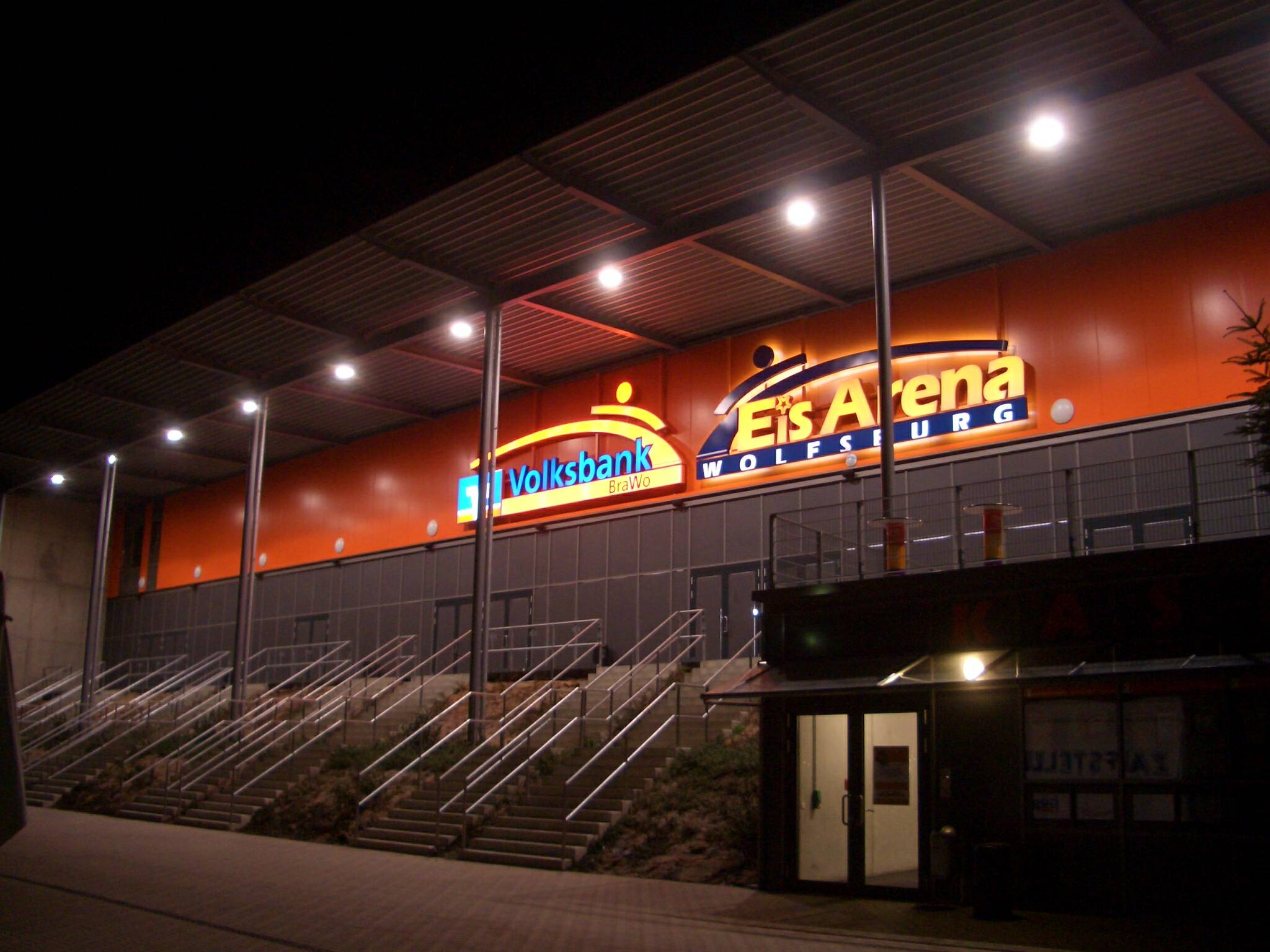
Eisarena Wolfsburg

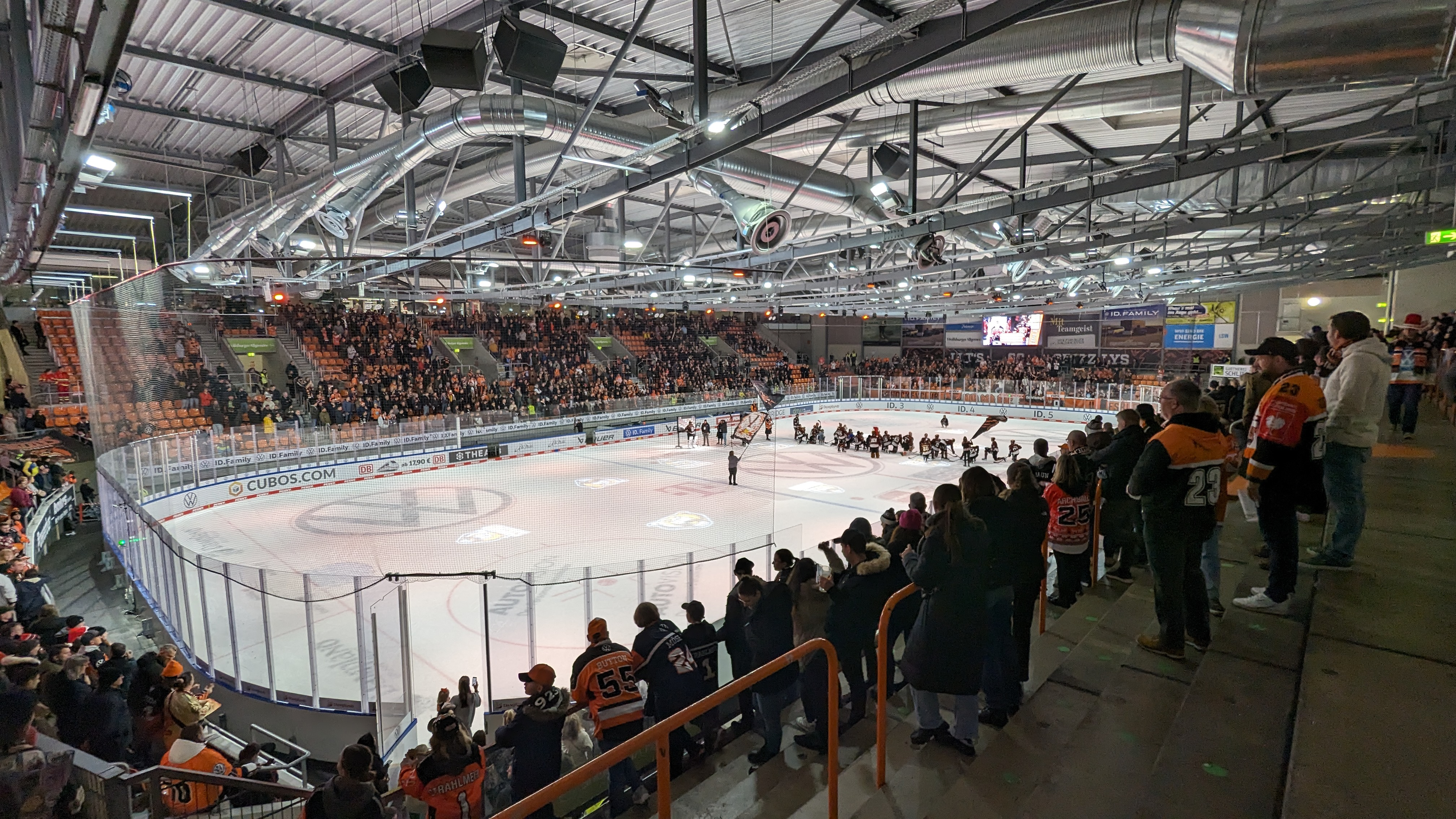
Interior, 2023

Eis Arena Wolfsburg is an arena in Wolfsburg, Germany. It is primarily used for the ice hockey club EHC Wolfsburg Grizzly Adams. Eisarena Wolfsburg opened in 2006 and holds up to 4,500 attendees.
