= 2011–12 DEL season =

- League: Deutsche Eishockey Liga
- Sport: Ice Hockey
- Games: 728
- Teams: 14
- Total attendance: 2,205,541 (6,059 per game)

Regular season
- Season champions: Eisbären Berlin
- Top scorer: (United States) Norm Milley (EHC Wolfsburg)

Finals
- Champions: Eisbären Berlin
- Runners-up: Adler Mannheim

DEL seasons
- ← 2010–11 2012–13 →

The 2011–12 Deutsche Eishockey Liga season was the 18th season since the founding of the Deutsche Eishockey Liga. Eisbären Berlin won the league championship after posting the top record during the regular season.

== Teams ==
Teams of the 2011–12 DEL season

| Team | City | Arena |
|---|---|---|
| Augsburger Panther | Augsburg | Curt Frenzel Stadium |
| Eisbären Berlin | Berlin | O2 World |
| DEG Metro Stars | Düsseldorf | ISS Dome |
| Hamburg Freezers | Hamburg | Color Line Arena |
| Hannover Scorpions | Hanover | TUI Arena |
| ERC Ingolstadt | Ingolstadt | Saturn Arena |
| Iserlohn Roosters | Iserlohn | Eissporthalle Iserlohn |
| Kölner Haie | Cologne | Lanxess Arena |
| Krefeld Pinguine | Krefeld | König Palast |
| Adler Mannheim | Mannheim | SAP Arena |
| EHC München | Munich | Olympia Eishalle |
| Thomas Sabo Ice Tigers | Nuremberg | Nuremberg Arena |
| Straubing Tigers | Straubing | Eisstadion am Pulverturm |
| Grizzly Adams Wolfsburg | Wolfsburg | Eisarena Wolfsburg |

== Regular season ==
| | Team | GP | W | OTW | SOW | OTL | SOL | L | Goals | Points |
|---|---|---|---|---|---|---|---|---|---|---|
| 1. | Eisbären Berlin | 52 | 26 | 3 | 4 | 2 | 1 | 16 | 171:140 | 95 |
| 2. | ERC Ingolstadt | 52 | 26 | 3 | 2 | 2 | 3 | 16 | 168:150 | 93 |
| 3. | EHC Wolfsburg | 52 | 25 | 2 | 4 | 1 | 3 | 17 | 174:122 | 91 |
| 4. | Adler Mannheim | 52 | 23 | 4 | 3 | 3 | 4 | 15 | 171:148 | 90 |
| 5. | Hamburg Freezers | 52 | 22 | 3 | 3 | 2 | 3 | 19 | 149:149 | 83 |
| 6. | Straubing Tigers | 52 | 20 | 4 | 4 | 1 | 3 | 20 | 161:151 | 80 |
| 7. | DEG Metro Stars | 52 | 18 | 2 | 5 | 5 | 4 | 17 | 162:167 | 80 |
| 8. | Augsburger Panther | 52 | 20 | 5 | 1 | 1 | 6 | 19 | 135:131 | 79 |
| 9. | Kölner Haie | 52 | 21 | 0 | 4 | 5 | 2 | 20 | 135:145 | 78 |
| 10. | Iserlohn Roosters | 52 | 19 | 1 | 5 | 4 | 4 | 19 | 150:150 | 77 |
| 11. | EHC München | 52 | 17 | 2 | 4 | 4 | 4 | 21 | 124:135 | 71 |
| 12. | Krefeld Pinguine | 52 | 18 | 0 | 4 | 2 | 5 | 23 | 126:153 | 69 |
| 13. | Thomas Sabo Ice Tigers | 52 | 13 | 5 | 0 | 2 | 4 | 28 | 122:165 | 55 |
| 14. | Hannover Scorpions | 52 | 12 | 2 | 4 | 2 | 1 | 31 | 119:161 | 51 |

GP = Games Played, W = Wins, OTW = Overtime win, SOW = Shootout win, OTL = Overtime loss, SOL = Shootout loss, L = Loss
Color code: = Direct Playoff qualification, = Playoff qualification round, = No playoff

== Playoffs ==
=== Playoff qualifications ===
The playoff qualifications were played between March 14, and 16, 2012 in a Best-of-three mode.

| | | | 1 | 2 | 3 |
|---|---|---|---|---|---|
| DEG Metro Stars | 2–0 | Iserlohn Roosters | 4–1 | 7–4 | – |
| Augsburger Panther | 0–2 | Kölner Haie | 1–5 | 1–3 | – |

=== Playoff bracket ===
Quarterfinals
1 | Eisbären Berlin | 4
9 | Kölner Haie | 0
3 | EHC Wolfsburg | 0
6 | Straubing Tigers | 4
(Pairings are reseeded after the first round)
4 | Adler Mannheim | 4
5 | Hamburg Freezers | 1
2 | ERC Ingolstadt | 4
7 | DEG Metro Stars | 1

Semifinals
1 | Eisbären Berlin | 3
6 | Straubing Tigers | 1
2 | ERC Ingolstadt | 1
4 | Adler Mannheim | 3

Final
1 | Eisbären Berlin | 3
4 | Adler Mannheim | 2

=== Quarterfinals ===
The quarterfinals will be played in a Best-of-seven mode starting March 21 until April 3, 2012.

| | | | 1 | 2 | 3 | 4 | 5 | 6 | 7 |
|---|---|---|---|---|---|---|---|---|---|
| Eisbären Berlin | 4–0 | Kölner Haie | 5–1 | 4–2 | 3–1 | 3–0 | – | – | – |
| Adler Mannheim | 4–1 | Hamburg Freezers | 4–0 | 8–1 | 1–2 | 3–1 | 3–1 | – | – |
| EHC Wolfsburg | 0–4 | Straubing Tigers | 1–2 | 0–7 | 1–3 | 3–7 | – | – | – |
| ERC Ingolstadt | 4–1 | DEG Metro Stars | 5–3 | 1–5 | 3–2 (OT) | 6–1 | 4–3 | – | – |

=== Semifinals ===
The semifinals were played in a Best-of-five mode starting April 5 to 11, 2012.

| | | | 1 | 2 | 3 | 4 | 5 |
|---|---|---|---|---|---|---|---|
| Eisbären Berlin | 3–1 | Straubing Tigers | 4–1 | 4–1 | 1–3 | 4–2 | |
| ERC Ingolstadt | 1–3 | Adler Mannheim | 1–4 | 3–4 | 3–0 | 2–6 | |

=== Finals ===
The finals will be played in a Best-of-five mode starting April 15 to 24, 2012.

| | | | 1 | 2 | 3 | 4 | 5 |
|---|---|---|---|---|---|---|---|
| Eisbären Berlin | 3–2 | Adler Mannheim | 2–0 | 1–4 | 1–2 | 6–5 (OT) | 3–1 |
