= Grizzlys Wolfsburg =

- City: Wolfsburg, Germany
- League: Deutsche Eishockey Liga
- Founded: 1975
- Home arena: Volksbank BraWo Eisarena (capacity: 4,660)
- Colors: Orange, black, white
- General manager: Karl-Heinz Fliegauf
- Head coach: Tyler Haskins
- Website: grizzlys.de

The Grizzlys Wolfsburg are a professional ice hockey club of the German professional ice hockey league Deutsche Eishockey Liga. They play their games at Eis Arena Wolfsburg.

== History ==
Wolfsburg earned their first promotion to the DEL in 2004. However, after one season, they were relegated back to 2.Bundesliga due to their arena not meeting league standards. In 2006, Eis Arena Wolfsburg opened, allowing the club to return to the DEL, where they have remained since.

The 2010–11 season marked the first time the club advanced to the league championship series, but they were swept by Eisbären Berlin.

== Honors ==
=== Winners ===
- Deutscher Eishockey-Pokal: 2009

=== Runners-up ===
- Deutsche Eishockey Liga Championship: 2011, 2016, 2017

== Season records ==
Season	Games	Won	Lost	Tie	OTL	SOL	Points	Goals for	Goals against	Rank	Playoffs
2004–05	52	19	29	0	4	-	58	134	174	13	Relegated
2007–08	56	19	34	-	2	1	55	152	202	13	No playoffs
2008–09	52	26	20	-	5	1	83	180	141	7	Lost in Quarterfinals
2009–10	56	33	19	-	2	2	97	192	152	3	Lost in Semi-finals
2010–11	52	31	13	-	2	6	96	156	116	1	Lost in Finals
2011–12	52	25	17	-	1	3	91	174	122	3	Lost in quarterfinals
2012–13	52	19	23	-	2	2	73	142	150	10	Lost in semi-finals
2013–14	52	25	19	-	2	1	88	151	125	6	Lost in semi-finals
2014–15	52	28	18	-	3	3	84	152	136	7	Lost in Semi-finals
2015–16	52	25	19	-	3	1	87	151	118	4	Lost in finals
2016–17	52	30	16	-	5	1	91	153	128	5	Lost in finals
2017–18	52	25	20	-	5	2	76	153	146	7	Lost in quarterfinals
2018–19	52	17	25	-	5	5	59	134	182	12	No playoffs
2019–20	52	26	23	-	2	1	74	147	150	9	Cancelled due to the COVID-19 pandemic.
2020–21	38	21	14	-	2	1	58	104	94	6	Lost in Finals
2021–22	56	27	15	-	2	3	104	166	139	3	Lost in Semi-finals
2022–23	56	30	17	-	5	4	93	172	150	5	Lost in Semi-finals
2023–24	52	26	19	-	5	0	87	152	145	4	Lost in Quarterfinals
2024–25	52	17	24	-	2	3	68	142	165	11	No playoffs
2025–26	52	23	22	-	4	3	73	156	153	8	Lost in pre-playoffs

== Players ==
=== Current roster ===
Updated 11 April 2025.

No.	Nat	Player	Pos	S/G	Age	Acquired	Birthplace
25	(Canada)	Darren Archibald (A)	RW	L	36	2021	Newmarket, Ontario, Canada
27	(Canada)	Nick Caamano	LW	L	28	2024	Ancaster, Ontario, Canada
40	(Germany)	Julian Chrobot	F	L	25	2023	Augsburg, Germany
13	(Germany)	Lucas Dumont	F	R	29	2022	Leonberg, Germany
30	(Germany)	Luca Erdmann	G	R	21	2024	Salzgitter, Germany
23	(Germany)	Gerrit Fauser (A)	C	L	37	2013	Nuremberg, Germany
71	(Canada)	Justin Feser	C	L	34	2023	Red Deer, Alberta, Canada
16	(Canada)	Tanner Kaspick	C	L	28	2025	Brandon, Manitoba, Canada
5	(Germany)	Björn Krupp	D	L	35	2021	Buffalo, New York, United States
7	(Canada)	Jimmy Lambert	RW	R	29	2025	Newcastle, England
93	(Canada)	Spencer Machacek (C)	RW	R	37	2018	Lethbridge, Alberta, Canada
28	(Germany)	Jimmy Martinovic	D	L	24	2023	Füssen, Germany
44	(Canada)	Julian Melchiori	D	L	34	2024	Richmond Hill, Ontario, Canada
51	(United States)	Andy Miele	C	L	38	2023	Grosse Pointe Woods, Michigan, United States
24	(Germany)	Janik Möser	D	L	30	2020	Mannheim, Germany
6	(Canada)	Ryan O'Connor	D	R	34	2023	Hamilton, Ontario, Canada
95	(Germany)	Fabio Pfohl	D	L	30	2019	Waldkraiburg, Germany
2	(United States)	John Ramage	D	R	35	2023	Mississauga, Ontario, Canada
50	(Germany)	Julius Ramoser	F	L	24	2024	Bolzano, Italy
91	(Germany)	Timo Ruckdäschel	F	L	21	2023	Kösching, Germany
1	(Germany)	Dustin Strahlmeier	G	L	34	2020	Gelsenkirchen, Germany
26	(Canada)	Phil Varone	C	L	35	2024	Vaughan, Ontario, Canada
22	(Slovakia)	Robin Veber	RW	L	22	2024	Wolfsburg, Germany
67	(Germany)	Hannibal Weitzmann	G	L	30	2023	Berlin, Germany
97	(United States)	Matt White	LW	L	37	2023	Whittier, California, United States
52	(Germany)	Sven Ziegler	RW	R	32	2025	Nürnberg, Germany
