= Stefan Schauer =

German ice hockey player

- Born: January 12, 1983 (age 42); Schongau, West Germany
- Height: 6 ft 1 in (185 cm)
- Weight: 187 lb (85 kg; 13 st 5 lb)
- Position: Defence
- Shot: Left
- Played for: SC Riessersee; Kölner Haie; EV Duisburg; Nürnberg Ice Tigers
- National team: Germany
- NHL draft: 162nd overall, 2001; Ottawa Senators
- Playing career: 2000–2007

Stefan Schauer (born 12 January 1983 in Schongau, West Germany) is a retired German ice hockey defenceman. He was drafted 162nd overall by the Ottawa Senators in the 5th round of the 2001 NHL entry draft.

== Career ==
Schauer played 203 games in the DEL, getting 29 points. He played for Kölner Haie and the Nürnberg Ice Tigers. He also played 127 games in the German second division for EV Duisburg and SC Riessersee, getting 30 points.

=== International ===
Schauer represented Germany at the 2003 World Junior Championships, the 2005 World Championships, and at the 2006 Olympic Winter Games.

== Career statistics ==
=== Regular season and playoffs ===
			Regular season					Playoffs
Season	Team	League	GP	G	A	Pts	PIM	GP	G	A	Pts	PIM
1999–2000	SC Riessersee	GER.2	3	0	0	0	0	—	—	—	—	—
1999–2000	SC Riessersee	GER U20	30	7	14	21	82	—	—	—	—	—
2000–01	SC Riessersee	GER.2	39	1	2	3	12	5	0	1	1	0
2000–01	SC Riessersee	DNL	11	1	7	8	24	—	—	—	—	—
2001–02	SC Riessersee	GER.2	52	2	20	22	64	—	—	—	—	—
2002–03	Kölner Haie	DEL	28	0	1	1	14	15	1	0	1	2
2002–03	EV Duisburg	GER.2	23	1	4	5	10	—	—	—	—	—
2003–04	Kölner Haie	DEL	45	1	1	2	41	5	0	0	0	4
2003–04	EV Duisburg	GER.2	8	0	0	0	10	—	—	—	—	—
2003–04	Kölner Haie	DEL	45	1	1	2	41	5	0	0	0	4
2004–05	Nürnberg Ice Tigers	DEL	51	2	6	8	89	6	1	1	2	10
2005–06	Nürnberg Ice Tigers	DEL	45	2	6	8	89	—	—	—	—	—
2006–07	Sinupret Ice Tigers	DEL	34	2	8	10	59	—	—	—	—	—
GER.2 totals			127	4	26	30	96	5	0	1	1	0
DEL totals			203	7	22	29	292	26	2	1	3	16

=== International ===
Year	Team	Event	GP	G	A	Pts	PIM
2000	Germany	U17		1	1	2
2000	Germany	WJC18	6	0	3	3	6
2001	Germany	WJC18	6	2	0	2	18
2002	Germany	WJC D1	5	0	0	0	4
2003	Germany	WJC	6	1	1	2	6
2005	Germany	WC	6	0	1	1	2
2006	Germany	OG	5	0	0	0	4
Junior totals			23	3	4	7	34
Senior totals			11	0	1	1	6
