= Kai Wissmann =

German ice hockey player (born 1996)

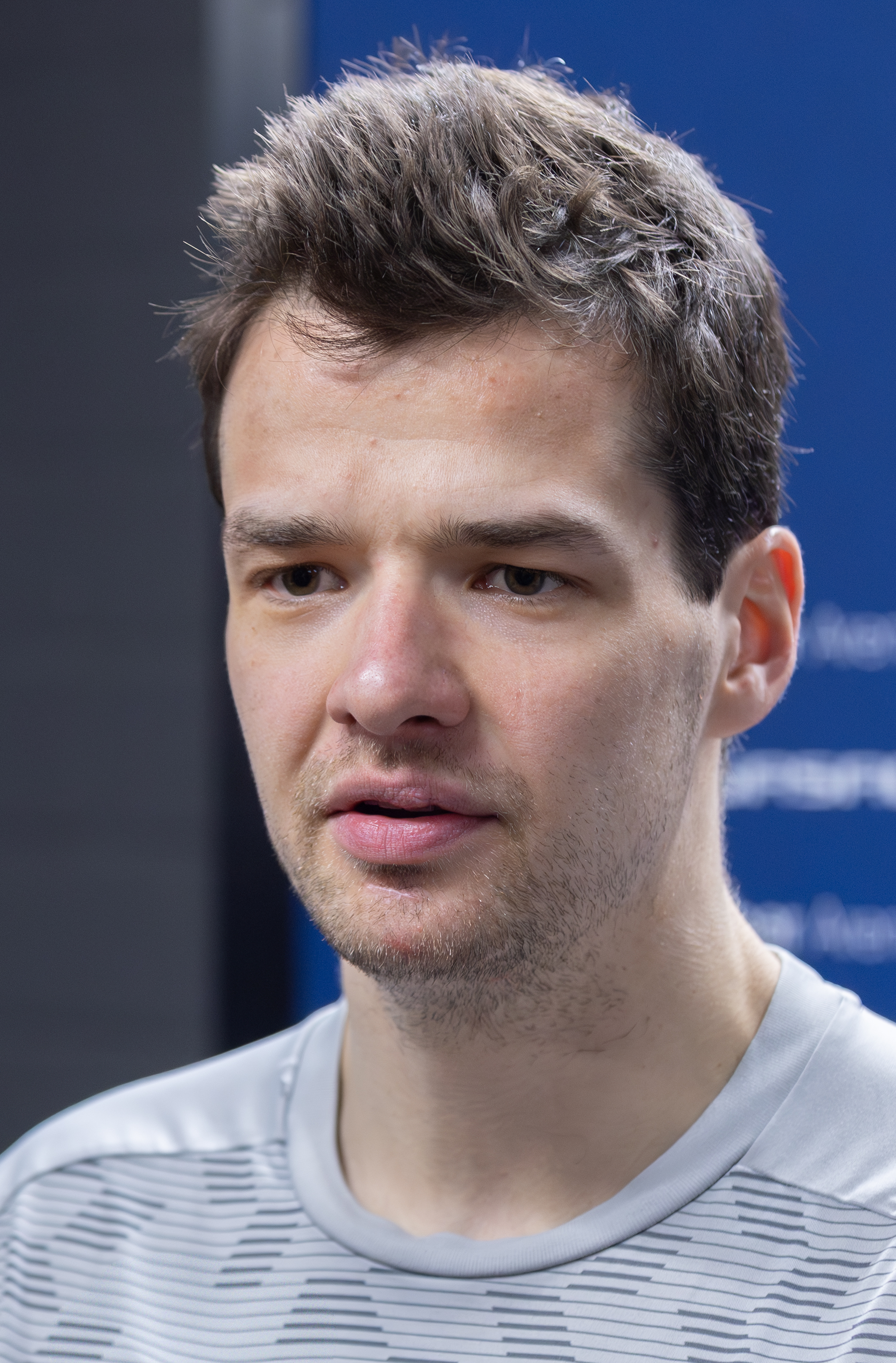
- Born: 22 October 1996 (age 29) Villingen-Schwenningen, Germany
- Height: 6 ft 4 in (193 cm)
- Weight: 207 lb (94 kg; 14 st 11 lb)
- Position: Defence
- Shoots: Right
- DEL team Former teams: Eisbären Berlin; Dresdner Eislöwen; Providence Bruins
- National team: Germany
- NHL draft: Undrafted
- Playing career: 2014–present
Medal record
Men's ice hockey
Representing Germany
World Championship
Silver medal – second place	2023 Finland/Latvia

Kai Wissmann (born 22 October 1996) is a German professional ice hockey player who is a defenceman for Eisbären Berlin of the Deutsche Eishockey Liga (DEL). He also spent one season with the Providence Bruins, the American Hockey League (AHL) affiliate of the Boston Bruins of the National Hockey League (NHL).

== Playing career ==
=== Eisbären Berlin ===
Wissmann moved from his hometown club Schwenninger ERC to Eisbären Berlin in the summer of 2012, where he initially played in the youth program. In early October 2014, he made his DEL debut for Eisbären in a game against Düsseldorfer EG. Between 2014 and 2016, he gained playing experience with the Dresdner Eislöwen in the DEL2 thanks to a development license. From then on, he was a permanent member of the Eisbären roster. At the end of the 2020–21 season, Wissmann and Eisbären won their 100th German Championship, after finishing first in the DEL North division. Wissmann and his team also finished the 2021–22 regular season in first place, leading the plus/minus record with +31. In the playoff final, the Eisbären defeated EHC Red Bull Munich 3-1 and Wissmann won his second German championship title.

=== Providence Bruins ===
After the season, Wissmann received a one-year entry-level contract from the Boston Bruins of the National Hockey League (NHL). However, during the season he played exclusively for their farm team, the Providence Bruins, in the American Hockey League (AHL). He played 31 games for Providence, recording nine points.

=== Return to Eisbären Berlin ===
The contract between the Bruins and Wissmann was not renewed, and he returned to Berlin to play for the Eisbären in June 2023. With the Eisbären, he was named team captain before the 2023–24 season and celebrated winning his third championship title with the team at the end of the season. He won his fourth and fifth titles in the 2024–25 and 2025–26 seasons.

== International play ==
Wissmann played for the German national team at the World Championships in 2022, 2023, and 2024. In 2023, he celebrated winning the silver medal with the team, contributing significantly with nine points.

== Career statistics ==
=== Regular season and playoffs ===
			Regular season					Playoffs
Season	Team	League	GP	G	A	Pts	PIM	GP	G	A	Pts	PIM
2008–09	Schwenninger ERC U16	Schüler-BL	8	0	0	0	2	—	—	—	—	—
2009–10	Schwenninger ERC U16	Schüler-BL	28	6	11	17	38	—	—	—	—	—
2010–11	Schwenninger ERC U16	Schüler-BL	24	9	6	15	20	—	—	—	—	—
2011–12	Schwenninger ERC U16	Schüler-BL	30	15	25	40	32	—	—	—	—	—
2012–13	Eisbären Juniors Berlin U18	DNL	32	3	8	11	18	7	1	1	2	8
2012–13	ECC Preussen Juniors Berlin U18	Jugend-BL	2	1	0	1	2	—	—	—	—	—
2013–14	Eisbären Juniors Berlin U18	DNL	35	10	22	32	54	8	2	4	6	16
2014–15	Eisbären Juniors Berlin U19	DNL Q	8	6	8	14	4	—	—	—	—	—
2014–15	Eisbären Juniors Berlin U19	DNL	4	1	0	1	14	2	0	1	1	0
2014–15	Eisbären Berlin	DEL	7	0	1	1	0	3	0	0	0	0
2014–15	Dresdner Eislöwen	DEL2	24	0	7	7	37	4	0	0	0	2
2015–16	Eisbären Berlin	DEL	14	0	0	0	6	—	—	—	—	—
2015–16	Dresdner Eislöwen	DEL2	25	2	5	7	20	9	0	1	1	29
2016–17	Eisbären Berlin	DEL	51	1	6	7	47	6	0	0	0	6
2017–18	Eisbären Berlin	DEL	52	0	17	17	14	18	0	8	8	10
2018–19	Eisbären Berlin	DEL	18	0	3	3	16	8	0	1	1	0
2019–20	Eisbären Berlin	DEL	50	1	12	13	34	—	—	—	—	—
2020–21	Eisbären Berlin	DEL	38	0	7	7	28	9	0	3	3	14
2021–22	Eisbären Berlin	DEL	55	4	16	20	24	12	1	6	7	8
2022–23	Providence Bruins	AHL	31	1	8	9	18	—	—	—	—	—
2023–24	Eisbären Berlin	DEL	44	5	25	30	30	13	2	8	10	8
2024–25	Eisbären Berlin	DEL	50	8	38	46	45	11	4	2	6	2
2025–26	Eisbären Berlin	DEL	12	3	5	8	4	14	1	9	10	52
DEL totals			391	22	130	152	248	94	8	37	45	100

=== International ===
Year	Team	Event	GP	G	A	Pts	PIM
2014	Germany U18	WJC-18	6	0	3	3	4
2015	Germany U20	WJC-20	6	0	0	0	16
2016	Germany U20	WJC-20 (D1)	5	2	0	2	0
2022	Germany	WC	8	2	5	7	0
2023	Germany	WC	10	1	8	9	2
2024	Germany	WC	8	1	2	3	2
2026	Germany	OG	5	0	0	0	4
2026	Germany	WC	7	0	1	1	0
Junior totals			17	2	3	5	20
Senior totals			38	4	16	20	8

== Awards and honours ==
Award	Year
DEL
Champion	2021, 2022, 2024, 2025, 2026
