= Leonhard Pföderl =

German ice hockey player (born 1993)

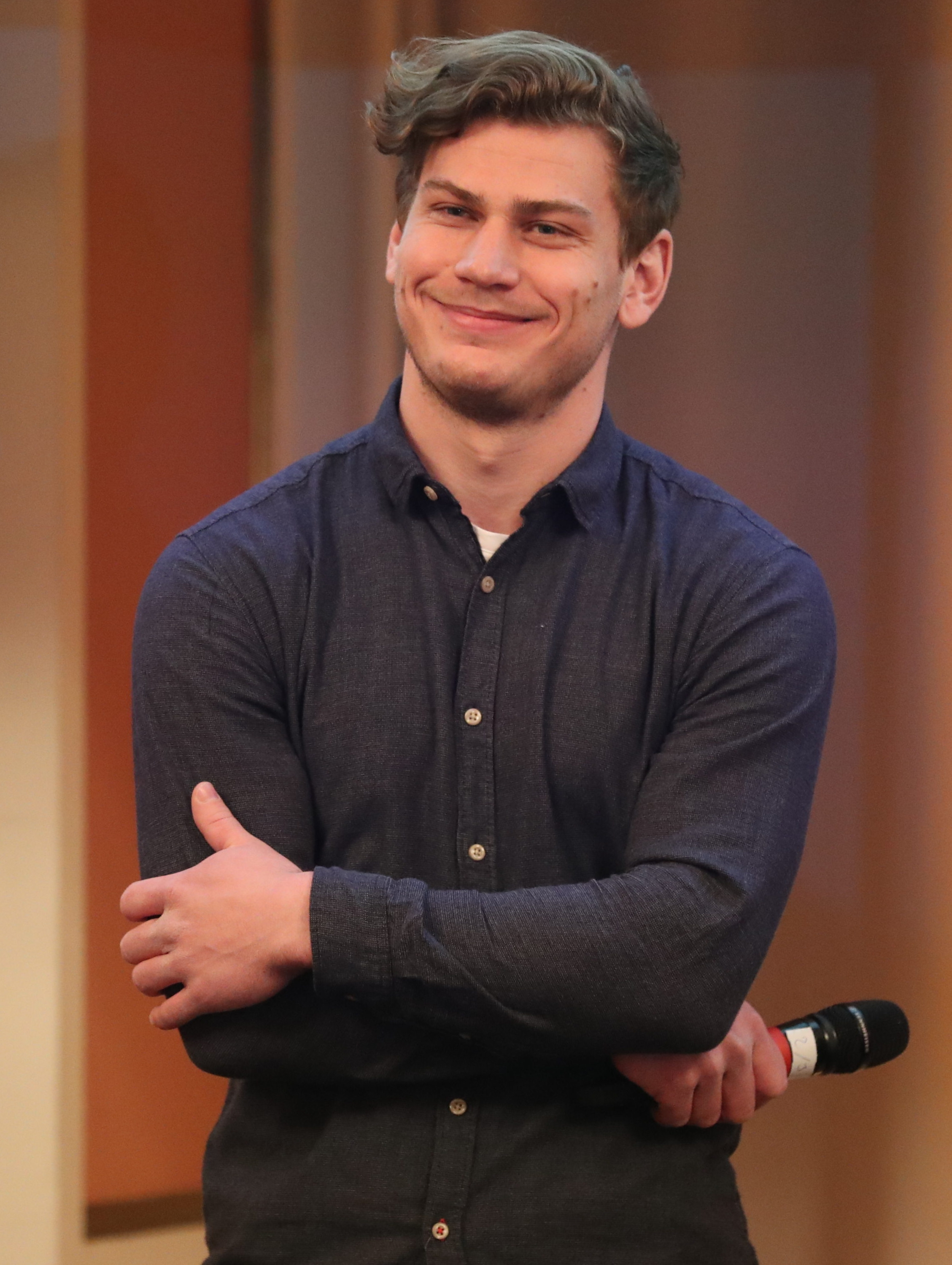
- Pföderl in 2022
- Born: 1 September 1993 (age 32) Bad Tölz, Germany
- Height: 6 ft 0 in (183 cm)
- Weight: 187 lb (85 kg; 13 st 5 lb)
- Position: Right Wing
- Shoots: Right
- DEL team Former teams: Eisbären Berlin; Thomas Sabo Ice Tigers
- National team: Germany
- Playing career: 2012–present

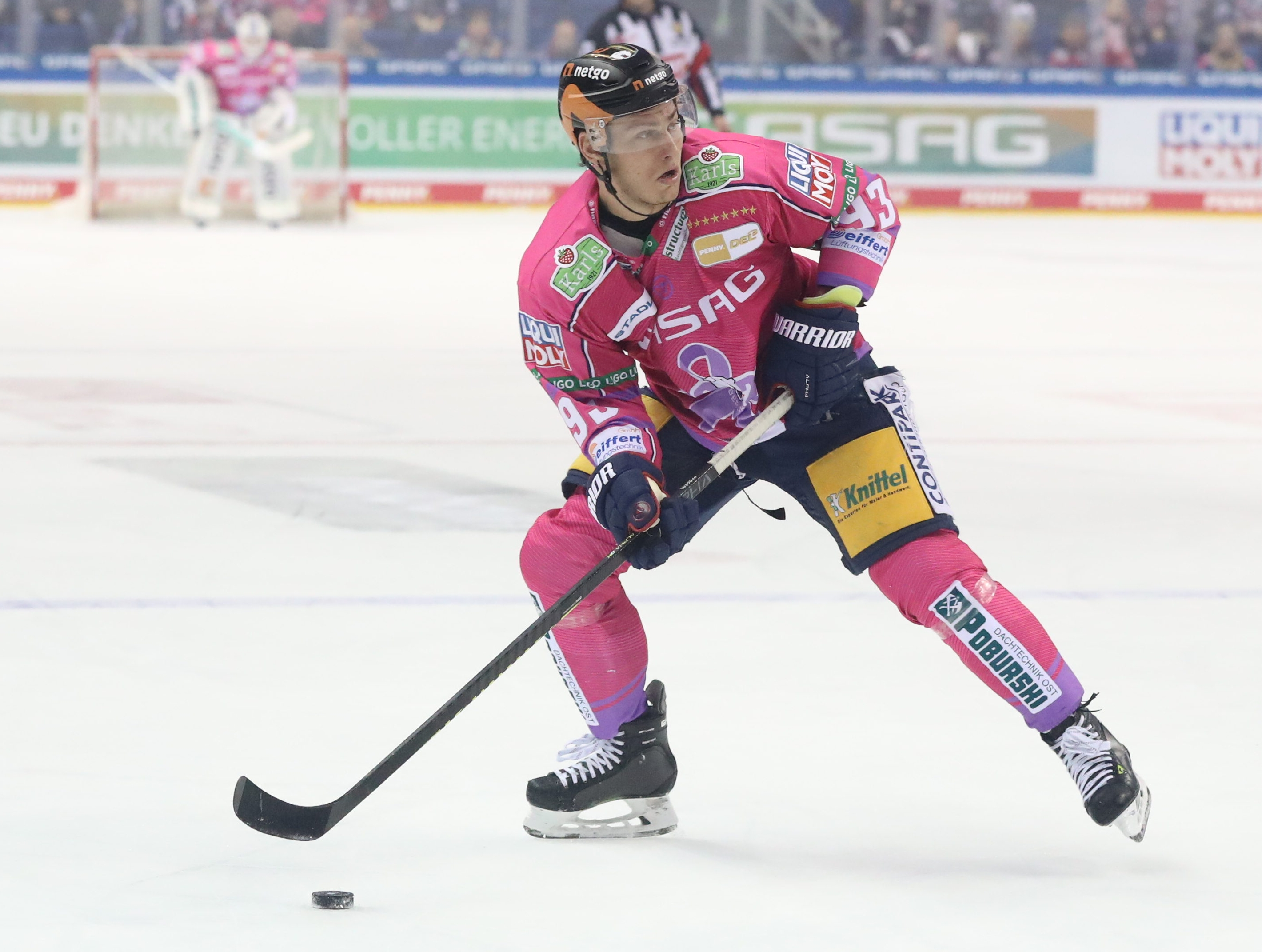
Leonhard Pföderl, 2021

Leonhard Pföderl (born 1 September 1993) is a German professional ice hockey forward. He is currently playing for Eisbären Berlin in the Deutsche Eishockey Liga (DEL) and he competed in the 2018 Winter Olympics, capturing a silver medal.

== Playing career ==
During the 2015–16 season, his fourth with the Thomas Sabo Ice Tigers, Pföderl agreed to a three-year contract extension on 24 February 2016.

After completing the 2018–19 season, his seventh in the DEL with the Ice Tigers, Pföderl left as a free agent in securing a multi-year contract with fellow German club, Eisbären Berlin on April 3, 2019.

== Career statistics ==
=== Regular season and playoffs ===
			Regular season					Playoffs
Season	Team	League	GP	G	A	Pts	PIM	GP	G	A	Pts	PIM
2008–09	Tölzer Löwen	DNL	33	15	23	38	10	4	2	3	5	2
2009–10	Tölzer Löwen	DNL	34	32	24	56	50	4	1	2	3	4
2009–10	Tölzer Löwen	3.GBun	12	0	1	1	8	—	—	—	—	—
2010–11	Tölzer Löwen	DNL	10	11	8	19	16	3	1	1	2	2
2010–11	Tölzer Löwen	3.GBun	36	10	19	29	20	7	2	7	9	4
2011–12	Tölzer Löwen	DNL	3	3	1	4	0	1	2	0	2	10
2011–12	Tölzer Löwen	3.GBun	33	11	10	21	55	15	4	6	10	8
2012–13	Thomas Sabo Ice Tigers	DEL	23	3	1	4	6	—	—	—	—	—
2012–13	Tölzer Löwen	3.GBun	12	4	7	11	6	10	5	5	10	10
2013–14	Thomas Sabo Ice Tigers	DEL	52	8	3	11	14	5	2	2	4	0
2013–14	Tölzer Löwen	3.GBun	2	1	3	4	8	—	—	—	—	—
2014–15	Thomas Sabo Ice Tigers	DEL	50	11	15	26	8	8	7	0	7	2
2014–15	Tölzer Löwen	3.GBun	1	0	1	1	0	—	—	—	—	—
2015–16	Thomas Sabo Ice Tigers	DEL	51	18	15	33	22	12	3	3	6	2
2016–17	Thomas Sabo Ice Tigers	DEL	52	22	26	48	18	1	0	0	0	2
2017–18	Thomas Sabo Ice Tigers	DEL	48	23	12	35	10	12	10	6	16	0
2018–19	Thomas Sabo Ice Tigers	DEL	51	17	17	34	18	8	2	0	2	2
2019–20	Eisbären Berlin	DEL	45	21	16	37	6	—	—	—	—	—
2020–21	Eisbären Berlin	DEL	34	20	17	37	20	6	3	2	5	4
2021–22	Eisbären Berlin	DEL	40	16	25	41	12	11	6	5	11	4
2022–23	Eisbären Berlin	DEL	48	17	14	31	11	—	—	—	—	—
2023–24	Eisbären Berlin	DEL	50	15	30	45	10	15	5	10	15	2
2024–25	Eisbären Berlin	DEL	51	26	45	71	18	14	8	10	18	0
DEL totals			595	217	236	453	173	92	46	38	84	18

Medal record

Representing Germany

Ice hockey

Olympic Games
Silver medal – second place	2018 Pyeongchang	

=== International ===
Year	Team	Event	Result	GP	G	A	Pts	PIM
2011	Germany	WJC18	6th	6	2	3	5	0
2012	Germany	WJC D1A	11th	5	3	3	6	0
2013	Germany	WJC	9th	6	1	1	2	0
2018	Germany	OG	2nd place, silver medalist(s)	3	1	0	1	0
2019	Germany	WC	6th	7	0	1	1	0
2021	Germany	WC	4th	10	2	3	5	2
2022	Germany	OG	10th	4	0	1	1	0
2022	Germany	WC	7th	7	3	3	6	0
2024	Germany	WC	6th	8	3	6	9	2
2025	Germany	WC	9th	6	0	0	0	2
Junior totals				17	6	7	13	0
Senior totals				45	9	14	23	6

== Awards and honours ==
Award	Year
DNL
Most Goals (32)	2010
DEL
Champion (Eisbären Berlin)	2021, 2022, 2024, 2025, 2026
Player of the year	2025
