= Pötzsch =

Pötzsch is a German language surname. It stems from a reduced form of the male given name Peter – and may refer to:

- Anett Pötzsch (1960), German former figure skater
- Oliver Pötzsch (1970), German author of popular fiction
