= Schongau, Bavaria =

Schongau
- Town
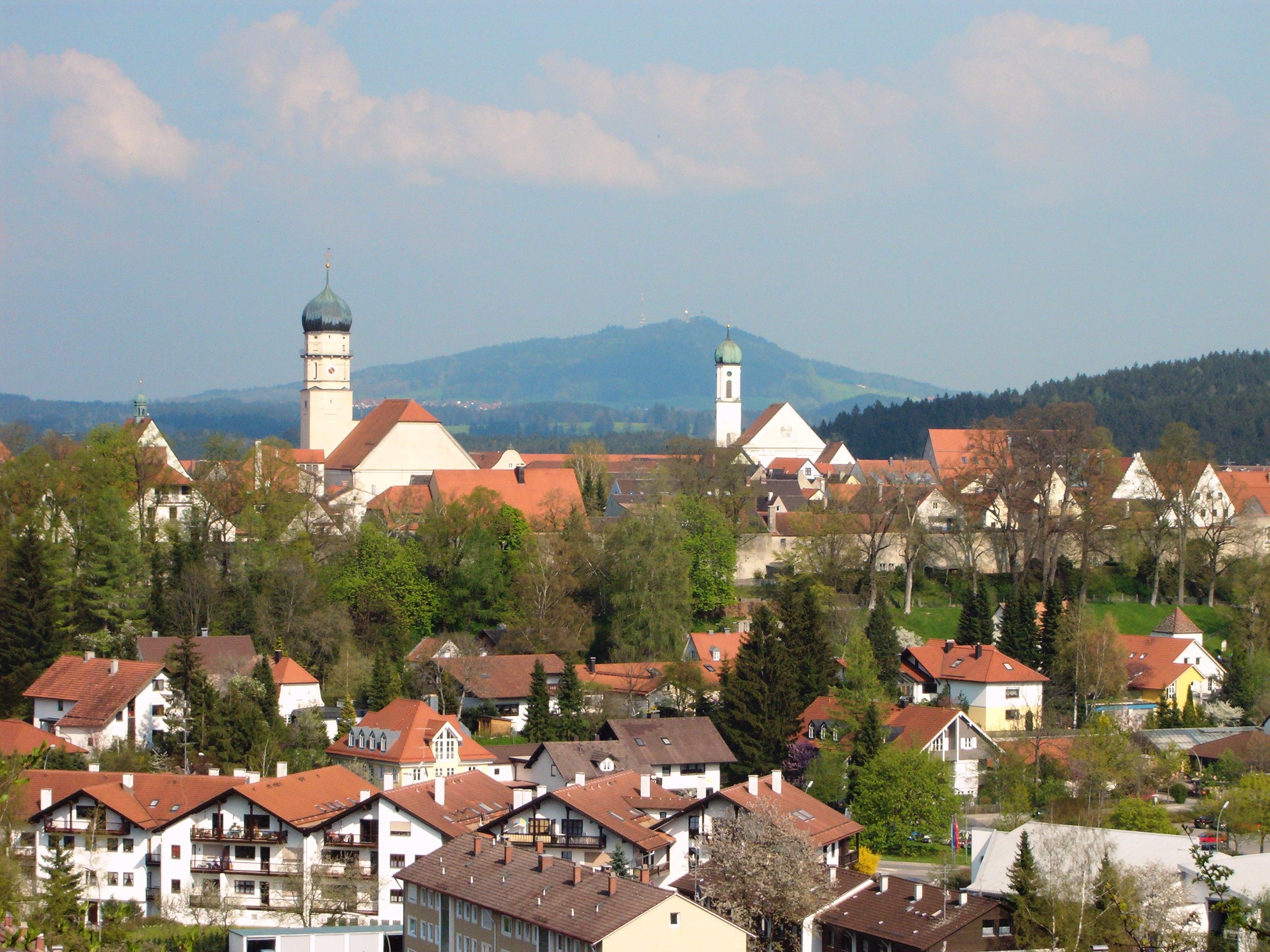
- General view of Schongau

- Coat of arms

- Location of Schongau within Weilheim-Schongau district
- Interactive map of Schongau
- Location within Germany Location within Bavaria
- Coordinates: 47°49′N 10°54′E
- Country: Germany
- State: Bavaria
- Admin. region: Upper Bavaria
- District: Weilheim-Schongau

Government
  - Mayor (2026–32): Thomas Schleich (UWV)
  - Governing parties: UWV

Area
  - Total: 21.34 km^{2} (8.24 sq mi)
- Elevation: 726 m (2,382 ft)

Population (2025-12-31)
  - Total: 12,676
  - Density: 594.0/km^{2} (1,538/sq mi)
- Time zone: UTC+01:00 (CET)
  - Summer (DST): UTC+02:00 (CEST)
- Postal codes: 86956
- Dialling codes: 08861
- Vehicle registration: WM, SOG
- Website: www.schongau.de

Schongau (German pronunciation: [ˈʃoːnɡaʊ]) is a town in Bavaria, southern Germany, near the Alps. It is located along the Lech, between Landsberg am Lech and Füssen. It has about 12,000 inhabitants. Schongau has a well-preserved old wall around the center.

== History ==
Schongau originated from the town currently known as Altenstadt (lit.: old town). In the 13th century, a large number of the inhabitants moved only a few kilometres into a new settlement founded on the Lech and took the name Schongau with them. The hillside was far better situated to defend it. The town of Schongau is located in close proximity to the former Roman road to Augsburg, Via Claudia Augusta (47 AD), and got its name from the Romans. In the Middle Ages, it was an important hub and commercial centre on the Verona-Augsburg-Nuremberg route and on the salt road from Berchtesgadener Land into the Allgäu.

Lechrain, populated by the Alemanni, was under the rule of the Swabian Welfs until the 12th century. After the death of Welf VI in 1191, the Welf territories in Swabia changed hands to the Hohenstaufen. Emperor Frederick Barbarossa gave it to the Hohenstaufen. When the last Staufer ruler Conradin moved to Italy in 1267 to defend his power against Charles of Anjou, his ally Duke Ludwig II of Bavaria unexpectedly denied his help and demanded the payment of debts, which is why Conradin had to give away a large part of his possessions as the Duke of Swabia (called the Konradinian donation). In this way, the Bavarian dukes of Wittelsbach, who were ambitious to extend their influence into the Alamannian settlements up to Lech, came to rule the Lechrain in 1268.

Emperor Ludwig the Bavarian had given Schongau the right to mint in 1331. Duke Christoph der Starke liked to stay in the city. Christophstrasse in the historic centre of the town is named after him. On 22 May 1493, a devastating fire destroyed large parts of the Oberstadt (upper town) and the ducal palace; it was not until 1514 that reconstruction was completed. Schongau was involved several times in martial conflicts and was often a transit camp for friendly and hostile troops.

Through trade and the diligence of its citizens, Schongau experienced a period of prosperity until the time of the European discovery of the Americas, which resulted in the relocation of the great trade routes. As a result, the city became so poor that significant buildings such as the castle and balehouse fell into partial decay or were demolished. After the Second World War, the city and the surrounding area gained a considerable number of residents due to refugees and developed into a district with relatively low unemployment due to the prosperous middle class.

The city had the first railroad connection with the Landsberg am Lech railway line to Schongau on 16 November 1886. The railway connection in the direction of Weilheim was opened on January 12, 1917, with the section from Peissenberg to Schongau on the railway line Weilheim-Schongau. The Kaufbeuren-Schongau railway line existed from 1923 to 1977; it was built because of mining in Peiting.

Schongau used to be a county of the same name. Due to the Bavarian district reform in 1972, it merged with the Weilheim district into today's Weilheim-Schongau county. In the town there are still some institutions from the county authority, and the name Altlandkreis Schongau (lit.: old county of Schongau) is still occasionally used.

== Transport ==
The town has a railway station, Schongau, on the Schongau–Peißenberg line.

Since 2025 Schongau is part of the MVV, joining as part of the expansion of the Munich based inter communal transit authority.

== Popular culture ==
Schongau and the nearby area is the setting of the Oliver Pötzsch novel The Hangman's Daughter.

== Twin towns ==
Schongau is twinned with the following towns:

- Colmar, France, since 1962
- Lucca, Italy, since 1962
- Sint-Niklaas, Belgium, since 1962
- Abingdon, United Kingdom, since 1970
- Gogolin, Poland, since 1996

== Mayor ==
Since May 1, 2026, the mayor of Schongau has been Thomas Schleich (UWV). He was elected with 66,7% of votes in March 2026. He succeeded Falk Sluyterman van Langeweyde (SPD) who ran for Landrat.

== Education ==
Schongau has two secondary schools, Pfaffenwinkel Realschule and Welfen-Gymnasium Schongau. Tertiary education is available through two vocational schools, Berufliches Schulzentrum Schongau and a branch of the Heimerer Schulen, which trains gerontological nursing.

On 8 July 2026, an attack took place at Welfen-Gymnasium, in which two 13-year-old female pupils were stabbed and heavily injured, following a failed shooting attempt. A 16-year-old male former pupil was arrested by police, who noted that he had been previously investigated in December 2025 for threats and glorification of mass shootings online. A manifesto was found in the pupil's belongings, declaring beliefs in accelerationist fascism and incel ideology. Der Spiegel also linked the attack to the True Crime Community. Classes resumed the following day.

== People ==
- Franz Rupp (1901–1992), pianist
- Reinhold Bocklet (1943–2025), CSU politician
- Günther Sigl (born 1947), rock musician
- Luitpold Braun, CSU politician
- Chris Pfeiffer (1970–2022), motorbike stunt rider
- Andreas Loth (born 1972), ice hockey player
- Markus Aspelmeyer (born 1975), quantum physicist
- Michael Kreitl (born 1975), ice hockey player
- Steffen Bilger (born 1979), Member of the Bundestag
- Stefan Schauer (born 1983), ice hockey player
- Bernhard Ebner (born 1990), ice hockey player
- Simon Jocher (born 1997), alpine ski racer
