= Frederik Tiffels =

German ice hockey player (born 1995)

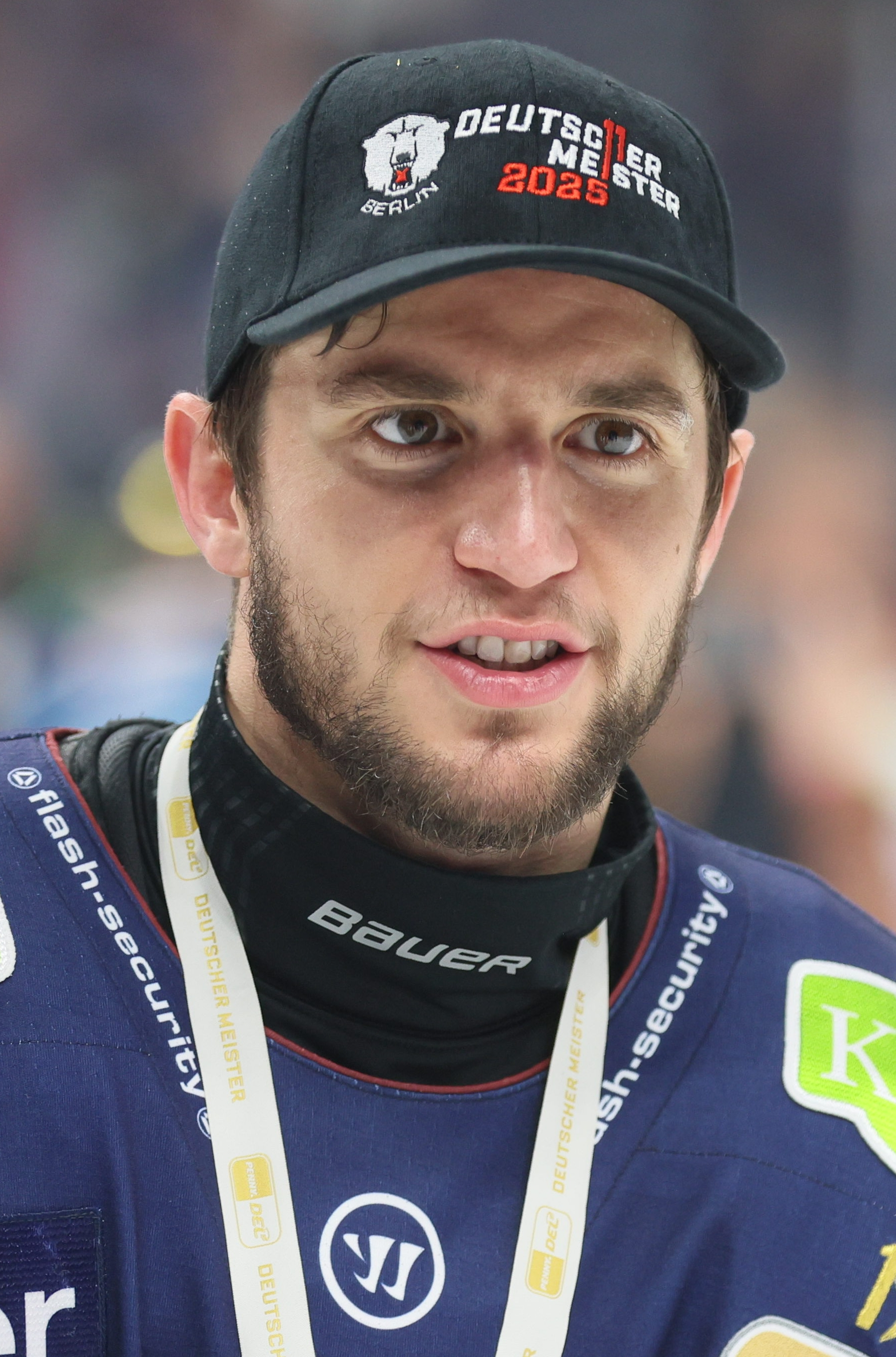
- Tiffels with the Eisbären Berlin in 2025
- Born: 20 May 1995 (age 31) Cologne, Germany
- Height: 6 ft 1 in (185 cm)
- Weight: 201 lb (91 kg; 14 st 5 lb)
- Position: Left wing
- Shoots: Left
- DEL team Former teams: Eisbären Berlin; Kölner Haie; EHC München
- National team: Germany
- NHL draft: 167th overall, 2015; Pittsburgh Penguins
- Playing career: 2017–present

Frederik Tiffels (born 20 May 1995) is a German professional ice hockey player who is a left winger for Eisbären Berlin of the Deutsche Eishockey Liga (DEL). He was drafted 167th overall in the 2015 NHL entry draft by the Pittsburgh Penguins.

== Playing career ==
Tiffels played as a youth in his native Germany, with Jungadler Mannheim, before opting to continue his development as a junior in the United States. He played in the United States Hockey League with the Muskegon Lumberjacks, Fargo Force, and the Cedar Rapids RoughRiders before committing to a collegiate career with the Western Michigan Broncos in the National Collegiate Hockey Conference.

After completion of his junior season with the Broncos in 2016–17, Tiffels concluded his collegiate career by agreeing to a two-year, entry-level contract with the defending Stanley Cup champions, the Pittsburgh Penguins, on 22 June 2017. In the 2017–18 season, he saw the ice in 12 AHL contests (two goals, one assist) for the Wilkes-Barre/Scranton Penguins, while appearing in 44 ECHL games (16 goals, 17 assists) for the Wheeling Nailers.

On 22 September 2018, he inked a three-year deal with Kölner Haie of the German Deutsche Eishockey Liga (DEL).

Following two seasons with EHC München, Tiffels, as a free agent, opted to continue his career in the DEL by joining his third club, Eisbären Berlin, on a one-year contract for the 2023–24 season on 29 May 2023.

== International play ==
Tiffels participated for the German national team at the 2017 IIHF World Championship and the 2018 IIHF World Championship.

Medal record

Representing Germany

Ice hockey

World Championships
Silver medal – second place	2023 Finland/Latvia	

== Career statistics ==
=== Regular season and playoffs ===
			Regular season					Playoffs
Season	Team	League	GP	G	A	Pts	PIM	GP	G	A	Pts	PIM
2010–11	Jungadler Mannheim	DNL	36	9	23	32	12	4	0	0	0	2
2011–12	Jungadler Mannheim	DNL	36	6	22	28	6	8	3	5	8	0
2012–13	Muskegon Lumberjacks	USHL	50	3	22	25	10	3	1	0	1	0
2013–14	Muskegon Lumberjacks	USHL	13	3	2	5	4	—	—	—	—	—
2013–14	Fargo Force	USHL	12	1	4	5	2	—	—	—	—	—
2013–14	Cedar Rapids RoughRiders	USHL	31	9	8	27	4	4	1	0	1	2
2014–15	Western Michigan University	NCHC	32	11	10	21	14	—	—	—	—	—
2015–16	Western Michigan University	NCHC	36	7	10	17	25	—	—	—	—	—
2016–17	Western Michigan University	NCHC	37	9	12	21	12	—	—	—	—	—
2017–18	Wilkes–Barre/Scranton Penguins	AHL	12	2	1	3	2	—	—	—	—	—
2017–18	Wheeling Nailers	ECHL	44	16	17	33	6	—	—	—	—	—
2018–19	Kölner Haie	DEL	27	6	16	22	14	11	4	5	9	6
2019–20	Kölner Haie	DEL	51	9	18	27	29	—	—	—	—	—
2020–21	Kölner Haie	DEL	37	12	23	35	22	—	—	—	—	—
2021–22	EHC München	DEL	45	12	37	49	12	11	0	6	6	2
2022–23	EHC München	DEL	55	6	22	28	20	13	1	3	4	2
2023–24	Eisbären Berlin	DEL	50	12	26	38	35	15	2	7	9	2
2024–25	Eisbären Berlin	DEL	50	14	24	38	14	14	4	15	19	6
AHL totals			12	2	1	3	2	—	—	—	—	—
DEL totals			315	71	166	237	146	64	11	36	47	18

=== International ===
Year	Team	Event	Result	GP	G	A	Pts	PIM
2011	Germany	U17	9th	5	2	2	4	0
2011	Germany	U18	6th	6	0	0	0	2
2012	Germany	U17	9th	5	2	0	2	6
2012	Germany	U18	6th	6	2	0	2	25
2013	Germany	WJC	9th	6	0	0	0	2
2014	Germany	WJC	9th	7	3	2	5	12
2015	Germany	WJC	10th	6	2	2	4	2
2017	Germany	WC	8th	8	2	0	2	6
2018	Germany	WC	11th	7	2	0	2	6
2019	Germany	WC	6th	8	2	2	4	4
2021	Germany	WC	4th	6	1	1	2	0
2022	Germany	OG	10th	4	0	0	0	0
2023	Germany	WC	2nd place, silver medalist(s)	10	3	3	6	0
2024	Germany	WC	6th	8	1	1	2	27
2025	Germany	WC	9th	7	2	1	3	6
2026	Germany	OG	6th	5	2	2	4	0
2026	Germany	WC	10th	7	3	6	9	0
Junior totals				41	11	6	17	49
Senior totals				70	18	16	34	49

== Awards and honours ==
Award	Year	Ref
DEL
Champion	2024, 2025, 2026	
