= Hangman's Daughter =

Hangman's Daughter may refer to:

- The Hangman's Daughter, a novel by Oliver Pötzsch
- Hangman's Daughter, a former subsidiary of Hangman Records
- The Hangman's Beautiful Daughter, album by The Incredible String Band
- From Dusk Till Dawn 3: The Hangman's Daughter, 2000 horror film
