= Marcel Noebels =

German ice hockey player (born 1992)

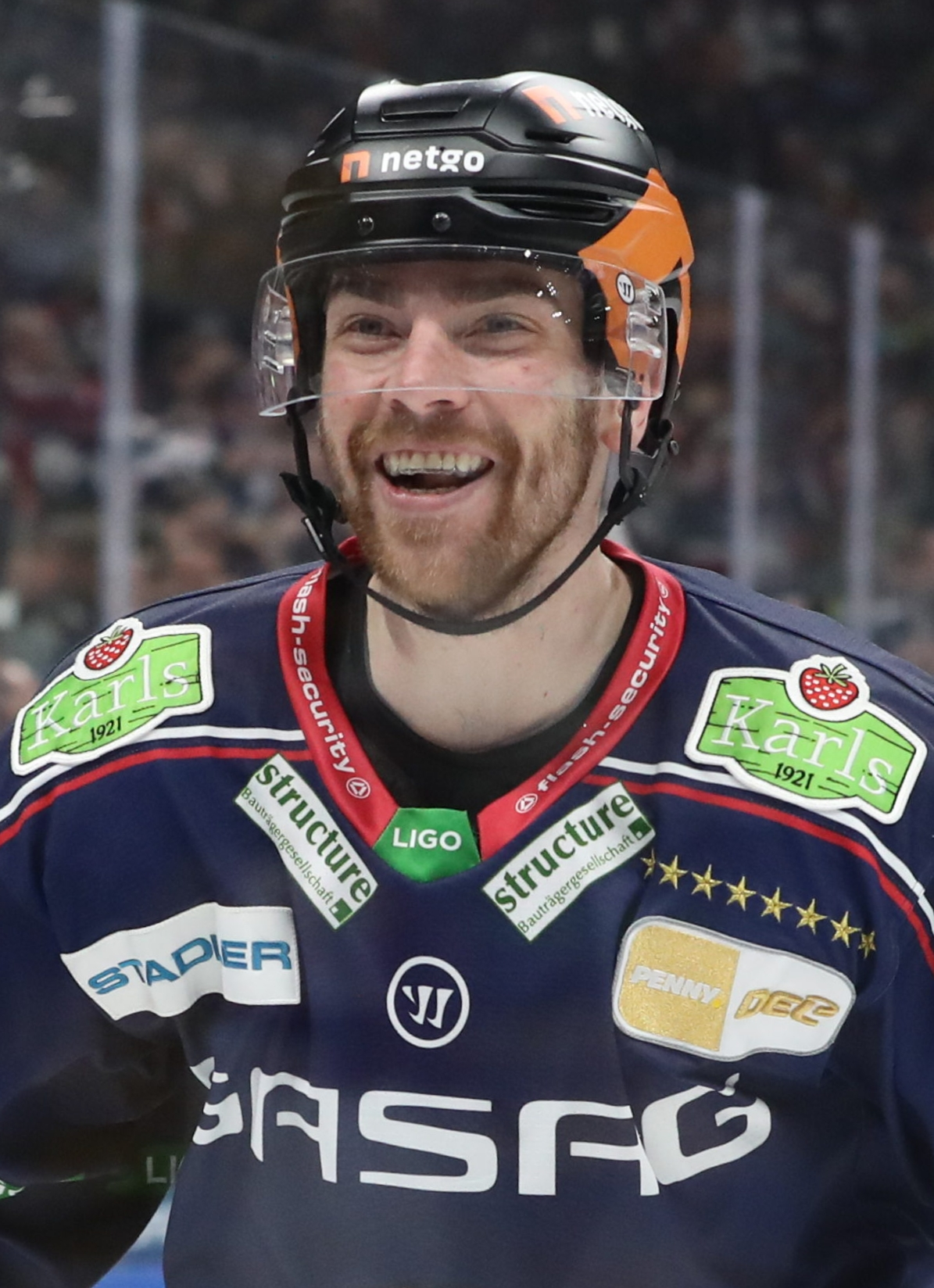
- Noebels with the Eisbären Berlin in 2022
- Born: March 14, 1992 (age 34) Tönisvorst, Germany
- Height: 6 ft 2 in (188 cm)
- Weight: 210 lb (95 kg; 15 st 0 lb)
- Position: Centre
- Shoots: Left
- DEL team Former teams: Kölner Haie; Krefeld Pinguine Eisbären Berlin
- National team: Germany
- NHL draft: 118th overall, 2011; Philadelphia Flyers
- Playing career: 2009–present

Marcel Noebels (born March 14, 1992) is a German professional ice hockey forward who currently plays for Kölner Haie of the Deutsche Eishockey Liga (DEL).

== Playing career ==
He made his professional debut with the Krefeld Pinguine during the 2009–10 season.

Noebels was drafted by the Philadelphia Flyers in the 4th round, 118th overall, of the 2011 NHL entry draft. He was signed to an entry-level contract by the Flyers on July 18, 2011.

Noebels split the 2012–13 season between the Trenton Titans of the ECHL and the Adirondack Phantoms of the American Hockey League (AHL), and spent the entire 2013–14 season with the Phantoms. Assigned to the Reading Royals before the 2014–15 season, Noebels left the team shortly after reporting to Reading, and the Flyers placed him on unconditional waivers for the purposes of terminating his contract on October 10, 2014. On October 13 he signed with Eisbären Berlin. He represented Germany at the 2018 IIHF World Championship.

== Career statistics ==
=== Regular season and playoffs ===
| | | | Regular season | | | | | Playoffs |
| Season | Team | League | GP | G | A | Pts | PIM | GP | G | A | Pts | PIM |
|---|---|---|---|---|---|---|---|---|---|---|---|---|
| 2007–08 | Jungadler Mannheim | DNL | 36 | 12 | 18 | 30 | 22 | 8 | 3 | 5 | 8 | 4 |
| 2008–09 | Jungadler Mannheim | DNL | 36 | 22 | 26 | 48 | 26 | 7 | 6 | 11 | 17 | 6 |
| 2009–10 | Krefeld Pinguine | DNL | 25 | 17 | 36 | 53 | 52 | 5 | 3 | 3 | 6 | 31 |
| 2009–10 | Krefeld Pinguine | DEL | 33 | 1 | 2 | 3 | 29 | — | — | — | — | — |
| 2010–11 | Seattle Thunderbirds | WHL | 66 | 28 | 26 | 54 | 23 | — | — | — | — | — |
| 2011–12 | Seattle Thunderbirds | WHL | 31 | 10 | 14 | 24 | 18 | — | — | — | — | — |
| 2011–12 | Portland Winterhawks | WHL | 31 | 10 | 24 | 34 | 8 | 22 | 8 | 15 | 23 | 6 |
| 2012–13 | Trenton Titans | ECHL | 31 | 11 | 19 | 30 | 14 | — | — | — | — | — |
| 2012–13 | Adirondack Phantoms | AHL | 43 | 13 | 10 | 23 | 6 | — | — | — | — | — |
| 2013–14 | Adirondack Phantoms | AHL | 52 | 3 | 8 | 11 | 29 | — | — | — | — | — |
| 2014–15 | Eisbären Berlin | DEL | 35 | 7 | 13 | 20 | 40 | 3 | 1 | 1 | 2 | 2 |
| 2015–16 | Eisbären Berlin | DEL | 52 | 11 | 22 | 33 | 43 | 7 | 1 | 1 | 2 | 2 |
| 2016–17 | Eisbären Berlin | DEL | 5 | 3 | 1 | 4 | 2 | 14 | 3 | 5 | 8 | 8 |
| 2017–18 | Eisbären Berlin | DEL | 52 | 11 | 19 | 30 | 10 | 18 | 6 | 8 | 14 | 12 |
| 2018–19 | Eisbären Berlin | DEL | 49 | 9 | 25 | 34 | 24 | 8 | 2 | 4 | 6 | 8 |
| 2019–20 | Eisbären Berlin | DEL | 52 | 23 | 26 | 49 | 16 | — | — | — | — | — |
| 2020–21 | Eisbären Berlin | DEL | 36 | 6 | 36 | 42 | 12 | 9 | 1 | 9 | 10 | 12 |
| 2021–22 | Eisbären Berlin | DEL | 50 | 20 | 36 | 56 | 14 | 12 | 1 | 9 | 10 | 0 |
| 2022–23 | Eisbären Berlin | DEL | 55 | 16 | 40 | 56 | 12 | — | — | — | — | — |
| 2023–24 | Eisbären Berlin | DEL | 50 | 13 | 34 | 47 | 8 | 12 | 4 | 10 | 14 | 8 |
| 2024–25 | Eisbären Berlin | DEL | 45 | 10 | 21 | 31 | 6 | 14 | 6 | 5 | 11 | 4 |
| DEL totals | | | 514 | 130 | 275 | 405 | 216 | 97 | 25 | 52 | 77 | 56 |

Medal record

Representing Germany

Ice hockey

Olympic Games
| Silver medal – second place | 2018 Pyeongchang | |

World Championships
| Silver medal – second place | 2023 Finland/Latvia | |

=== International ===
| Year | Team | Event | Result | GP | G | A | Pts | PIM |
|---|---|---|---|---|---|---|---|---|
| 2009 | Germany | U17 | 6th | 5 | 2 | 0 | 2 | 4 |
| 2009 | Germany | WJC18 | 10th | 6 | 0 | 0 | 0 | 0 |
| 2010 | Germany | WJC18 D1 | 11th | 5 | 9 | 10 | 19 | 0 |
| 2011 | Germany | WJC | 10th | 6 | 1 | 2 | 3 | 0 |
| 2012 | Germany | WJC D1 | 11th | 5 | 4 | 5 | 9 | 6 |
| 2013 | Germany | WC | 9th | 3 | 0 | 0 | 0 | 0 |
| 2014 | Germany | WC | 14th | 7 | 1 | 0 | 1 | 0 |
| 2016 | Germany | WC | 7th | 7 | 0 | 3 | 3 | 2 |
| 2018 | Germany | OG | 2nd place, silver medalist(s) | 7 | 1 | 0 | 1 | 2 |
| 2018 | Germany | WC | 11th | 7 | 0 | 1 | 1 | 2 |
| 2019 | Germany | WC | 6th | 8 | 0 | 0 | 0 | 0 |
| 2021 | Germany | WC | 4th | 10 | 3 | 5 | 8 | 2 |
| 2022 | Germany | OG | 10th | 4 | 0 | 0 | 0 | 0 |
| 2022 | Germany | WC | 7th | 8 | 0 | 6 | 6 | 0 |
| 2023 | Germany | WC | 2nd place, silver medalist(s) | 10 | 3 | 5 | 8 | 2 |
| 2025 | Germany | WC | 9th | 2 | 0 | 0 | 0 | 0 |
| Junior totals | | | | 27 | 16 | 17 | 33 | 10 |
| Senior totals | | | | 73 | 8 | 20 | 28 | 10 |

== Awards and honors ==
| Award | Year |
|---|---|
ECHL
| All-Star Game | 2013 |
DEL
| Forward of the Year | 2020, 2021 |
| Player of the Year | 2020, 2021 |
| Champion (Eisbären Berlin) | 2021, 2022, 2024, 2025, 2026 |
