= 2024–25 DEL season =

- League: Deutsche Eishockey Liga
- Sport: Ice hockey
- Duration: 19 September 2024 – TBD
- Games: 364
- Teams: 14
- Total attendance: 2,832,364

Regular season
- Season champions: ERC Ingolstadt
- Season MVP: Leonhard Pföderl
- Top scorer: Ty Ronning (73 points)
- Relegated to DEL2: Düsseldorfer EG

Finals
- Champions: Eisbären Berlin
- Runners-up: Kölner Haie
- Finals MVP: Ty Ronning

DEL seasons
- ← 2023–24 2025–26 →

The 2024–25 Deutsche Eishockey Liga season was the 31st season since the founding of the Deutsche Eishockey Liga. It started on 19 September 2024.

Eisbären Berlin were the defending champions and captured the title again with a win over the Kölner Haie. The Augsburger Panther were originally relegated last year, but kept their place since the winning team from the second division did not apply for a license.

== Format ==
The teams played a double round-robin for 52 games each. After the regular season, places one to six were qualified for the playoffs while place seven to ten played in the pre-playoffs. The playoffs were played in a best of seven mode. The last team from the regular season was relegated to DEL2.

== Teams ==
Locations of the Teams of the 2024–25 DEL season

Team	City	Arena	Capacity
Augsburger Panther	Augsburg	Curt Frenzel Stadium	6,218
Eisbären Berlin	Berlin	Uber Arena	14,200
Fischtown Pinguins	Bremerhaven	Eisarena Bremerhaven	4,674
Düsseldorfer EG	Düsseldorf	PSD Bank Dome	13,400
Löwen Frankfurt	Frankfurt	Eissporthalle Frankfurt	6,000
ERC Ingolstadt	Ingolstadt	Saturn Arena	4,815
Iserlohn Roosters	Iserlohn	Eissporthalle Iserlohn	5,000
Kölner Haie	Cologne	Lanxess Arena	18,500
Adler Mannheim	Mannheim	SAP Arena	13,600
EHC Red Bull München	Munich	SAP Garden	11,000
Nürnberg Ice Tigers	Nuremberg	Arena Nürnberger Versicherung	7,810
Schwenninger Wild Wings	Villingen-Schwenningen	Helios Arena	5,300
Straubing Tigers	Straubing	Eisstadion am Pulverturm	6,000
Grizzlys Wolfsburg	Wolfsburg	Eis Arena Wolfsburg	4,660

== Regular season ==
=== Standings ===
Pos	Team	Pld	W	OTW	OTL	L	GF	GA	GD	Pts	Qualification or relegation
1	ERC Ingolstadt	52	33	5	4	10	191	128	+63	113	Advance to Playoffs, Regular season winners and Champions Hockey League
2	Eisbären Berlin (C)	52	29	7	6	10	203	150	+53	107	Advance to Playoffs and Champions Hockey League
3	Fischtown Pinguins	52	26	4	8	14	162	112	+50	94	Advance to Playoffs and Champions Hockey League (Note: With Eisbären Berlin finishing second and winning 2024–25 DEL, the third CHL qualifying spot went to next best club in 2024–25 DEL regular standings not already qualified, Fischtown Pinguins.)
4	Adler Mannheim	52	26	4	5	17	160	138	+22	91	Playoffs
5	EHC Red Bull München	52	25	4	5	18	157	145	+12	88	Playoffs
6	Kölner Haie	52	25	3	6	18	156	148	+8	87	Playoffs
7	Straubing Tigers	52	21	6	1	24	159	158	+1	76	Pre-playoffs
8	Nürnberg Ice Tigers	52	15	9	10	18	144	162	−18	73	Pre-playoffs
9	Schwenninger Wild Wings	52	15	10	6	21	160	155	+5	71	Pre-playoffs
10	Löwen Frankfurt	52	17	6	6	23	149	170	−21	69	Pre-playoffs
11	Grizzlys Wolfsburg	52	17	6	5	24	142	165	−23	68	
12	Iserlohn Roosters	52	11	6	8	27	140	180	−40	53	
13	Augsburger Panther	52	12	6	3	31	135	185	−50	51	
14	Düsseldorfer EG (R)	52	11	5	8	28	136	198	−62	51	Relegated to DEL2

Source: DEL
Rules for classification: 1) points; 2) head-to-head points; 3) head-to-head goal difference; 4) head-to-head number of goals scored.
(C) Play-off Champions and Champions Hockey League; (R) Relegated

=== Results ===
Home \ Away	AUG	BER	BRE	DÜS	FRA	ING	ISE	KÖL	MAN	MUN	NÜR	SCH	STR	WOL	AUG	BER	BRE	DÜS	FRA	ING	ISE	KÖL	MAN	MUN	NÜR	SCH	STR	WOL
Augsburger Panther	—	2–3	2–5	6–1	4–1	3–2 (Note: Overtime)	1–2 (Note: Shootout)	7–6	1–4	4–5	5–4	2–4	0–4	3–4	—	2–4	2–6	5–1	2–1	2–5	2–5	3–4	1–3	3–5	4–3	5–3	4–1	6–2
Eisbären Berlin	6–2	—	4–3	4–3	5–2	0–4	6–3	2–3	4–3	1–4	6–2	3–4	6–2	5–4	5–0	—	3–4	10–2	2–3	1–6	3–2	5–4	5–2	2–3	2–1	7–3	4–2	6–3
Fischtown Pinguins	4–1	2–1	—	2–1	3–0	0–5	5–0	0–2	1–2	4–5	6–7	3–0	3–0	4–1	1–2	5–4	—	5–1	5–1	1–3	5–2	4–1	5–3	4–0	1–0	2–1	4–5	5–1
Düsseldorfer EG	4–3	3–5	1–3	—	0–3	4–1	3–4	3–6	0–2	0–8	2–3	3–2	3–4	2–5	7–2	3–2	1–3	—	4–3	2–3	6–1	4–7	4–5	1–2	4–3	4–3	3–2	3–0
Löwen Frankfurt	4–3	2–5	1–7	2–7	—	5–3	6–2	5–1	3–1	2–3	3–2	1–2	2–5	4–3	5–4	5–1	2–4	4–8	—	3–2	5–4	0–2	5–1	4–5	2–1	4–3	6–4	3–5
ERC Ingolstadt	4–1	2–4	4–2	4–3	2–0	—	5–1	5–4	3–2	3–2	4–0	5–3	5–2	7–5	4–1	3–1	2–3	7–1	2–3	—	5–1	1–4	6–2	4–2	3–2	0–4	3–2	5–1
Iserlohn Roosters	4–3	1–4	4–0	2–1	3–4	3–5	—	2–1	3–4	5–7	6–2	3–4	2–5	1–3	1–3	5–6	2–3	6–3	3–4	4–5	—	3–2	2–4	0–3	4–3	4–3	1–4	4–2
Kölner Haie	3–1	2–6	1–3	5–1	4–3	2–3	0–4	—	3–1	3–2	5–6	2–3	2–0	2–1	2–3	5–3	4–1	5–3	3–2	2–5	3–2	—	4–7	2–3	4–2	2–4	3–4	3–2
Adler Mannheim	6–1	3–9	1–0	4–2	0–2	1–3	4–1	4–1	—	4–1	5–4	4–3	3–0	3–4	6–2	4–5	2–1	6–0	3–0	4–3	2–3	1–4	—	4–1	4–2	3–2	4–1	1–2
EHC Red Bull München	2–4	2–3	1–2	1–2	5–4	5–1	2–1	4–6	5–4	—	4–0	4–2	2–5	7–4	3–2	2–3	3–1	1–4	5–3	0–4	1–3	1–2	2–0	—	3–4	5–2	3–1	3–2
Nürnberg Ice Tigers	4–1	2–3	0–9	6–3	3–2	6–2	0–4	3–2	4–1	4–1	—	4–1	3–4	4–0	4–1	2–5	2–1	5–4	0–4	5–4	4–3	1–3	1–2	2–1	—	3–7	2–5	2–1
Schwenninger Wild Wings	1–2	4–3	2–1	2–4	7–3	3–6	2–1	2–0	6–2	4–3	3–2	—	1–2	4–2	4–2	3–6	6–4	4–2	7–2	4–5	4–1	5–2	2–5	6–0	0–2	—	3–4	3–2
Straubing Tigers	9–1	2–4	4–2	7–2	2–1	2–5	6–2	1–2	2–6	2–6	1–4	2–0	—	2–4	3–4	3–4	4–3	4–2	3–2	1–4	5–4	4–3	2–1	6–3	2–4	4–1	—	3–2
Grizzlys Wolfsburg	2–1	2–3	2–1	4–0	4–1	6–3	4–3	1–2	3–1	1–2	1–2	4–3	5–3	—	2–0	1–3	6–5	2–1	1–7	3–4	3–2	2–6	4–6	1–4	4–3	4–1	5–2	—

Source: DEL
Legend: Blue = home team win; Yellow = draw; Red = away team win.

== Playoffs ==
The playoffs will be held between 9 March and 29 April 2025. The first round will be played in a best-of-three mode, afterwards it will be best-of-seven.

=== Bracket ===
First round
7	Straubing Tigers	2
10	Löwen Frankfurt	0
8	Nürnberg Ice Tigers	2
9	Schwenninger Wild Wings	1

Quarterfinals
1	ERC Ingolstadt	4
8	Nürnberg Ice Tigers	2
2	Eisbären Berlin	4
7	Straubing Tigers	1
3	Fischtown Pinguins	2
6	Kölner Haie	4
4	Adler Mannheim	4
5	EHC Red Bull München	2

Semifinals
1	ERC Ingolstadt	2
6	Kölner Haie	4
(Pairings are re-seeded after the first and second round)
2	Eisbären Berlin	4
4	Adler Mannheim	0

Finals
2	Eisbären Berlin	4
6	Kölner Haie	1

=== Pre-playoffs ===
The pre-playoffs were played between 9 and 13 March 2025 in a best-of-three mode.

==== Straubing Tigers vs Löwen Frankfurt ====
9 March 2025	Straubing Tigers	2–1	Löwen Frankfurt	Eisstadion am Pulverturm, Straubing	Recap
Josh Melnick – 08:05		First period	06:10 – Reid McNeill
Joshua Samanski – 32:20		Second period	No scoring
No scoring		Third period	No scoring
Zane McIntyre (19 saves / 20 shots)		Goalie stats	Cody Brenner (30 saves / 32 shots)

11 March 2025	Löwen Frankfurt	0–1	Straubing Tigers	Eissporthalle Frankfurt, Frankfurt	Recap
No scoring		First period	No scoring
No scoring		Second period	No scoring
No scoring		Third period	40:28 – Josh Melnick (PP)
Cody Brenner (31 saves / 32 shots)		Goalie stats	Zane McIntyre (16 saves / 16 shots)

Straubing won series 2–0

==== Nürnberg Ice Tigers vs Schwenninger Wild Wings ====
9 March 2025	Nürnberg Ice Tigers	4–3	Schwenninger Wild Wings	Arena Nürnberger Versicherung, Nuremberg	Recap
Ryan Stoa – 07:13; Owen Headrick – 16:56		First period	06:44 – Brett Ritchie (PP)
Cole Maier – 27:32; Cody Haiskanen (EA) – 34:04		Second period	33:21 – Zachary Senyshyn; 34:19 – Alexander Karachun
No scoring		Third period	No scoring
Leon Hungerecker (34 saves / 37 shots)		Goalie stats	Joacim Eriksson (28 saves / 32 shots)

11 March 2025	Schwenninger Wild Wings	3–1	Nürnberg Ice Tigers	Helios Arena, Villingen-Schwenningen	Recap
Brett Ritchie (PP) – 08:30		First period	15:36 – Jeremy McKenna
Brett Ritchie – 20:28		Second period	No scoring
Brandon McMillan (EN) – 59:51		Third period	No scoring
Joacim Eriksson (24 saves / 25 shots)		Goalie stats	Leon Hungerecker (32 saves / 35 shots)

13 March 2025	Nürnberg Ice Tigers	4–2	Schwenninger Wild Wings	Arena Nürnberger Versicherung, Nuremberg	Recap
Ryan Stoa – 11:24		First period	No scoring
No scoring		Second period	No scoring
Cole Maier – 47:51; Jeremy McKenna – 58:04; Ryan Stoa (EA) – 58:52		Third period	50:26 – Boaz Bassen; 54:17 – Jordan Murray
Leon Hungerecker (17 saves / 19 shots)		Goalie stats	Joacim Eriksson (30 saves / 34 shots)

Nuremberg won series 2–1

=== Quarterfinals ===
The quarterfinals were played between 16 and 28 March 2025 in a best-of-seven mode.

==== ERC Ingolstadt vs Nürnberg Ice Tigers ====
16 March 2025	ERC Ingolstadt	5–4	OT	Nürnberg Ice Tigers	Saturn Arena, Ingolstadt	Recap
No scoring		First period		06:07 – Eugen Alanov; 08:01 – Jeremy McKenna
Austen Keating – 23:54; Morgan Ellis – 25:46; Abbott Girduckis – 30:42; Wayne Simpson (PP) – 37:40		Second period		No scoring
No scoring		Third period		51:59 – Evan Barratt (PP); 52:56 – Charlie Gerard
Wojciech Stachowiak – 66:56		First overtime period		No scoring
Christian Heljanko (20 saves / 24 shots)		Goalie stats		Leon Hungerecker (39 saves / 44 shots)

18 March 2025	Nürnberg Ice Tigers	1–3	ERC Ingolstadt	Arena Nürnberger Versicherung, Nuremberg	Recap
No scoring		First period	12:24 – Kenny Agostino
Jeremy McKenna (PP) – 31:05		Second period	38:11 – Kenny Agostino (PP)
No scoring		Third period	58:07 – Riley Sheen (EN)
Leon Hungerecker (18 saves / 21 shots)		Goalie stats	Christian Heljanko (41 saves / 42 shots)

21 March 2025	ERC Ingolstadt	5–6	OT	Nürnberg Ice Tigers	Saturn Arena, Ingolstadt	Recap
Wojciech Stachowiak – 05:13; Austen Keating – 16:49		First period		08:09 – Will Graber (PP)
Daniel Schmölz – 25:47		Second period		22:15 – Evan Barratt; 27:55 – Cole Maier; 37:24 – Owen Headrick (PP)
Myles Powell (PP) – 45:40; Wayne Simpson (PP) – 46:42		Third period		54:47 – Owen Headrick (PP)
No scoring		First overtime period		64:27 – Hayden Shaw
Christian Heljanko (28 saves / 33 shots)		Goalie stats		Leon Hungerecker (26 saves / 31 shots)

23 March 2025	Nürnberg Ice Tigers	3–2	OT	ERC Ingolstadt	Arena Nürnberger Versicherung, Nuremberg	Recap
No scoring		First period		16:24 – Wayne Simpson (PP)
William Graber (PP) – 21:47		Second period		37:08 – Kenny Agostino (PP)
Constantin Braun (PP) – 51:35		Third period		No scoring
Jeremy McKenna – 64:21		First overtime period		No scoring
Leon Hungerecker (38 saves / 40 shots)		Goalie stats		Devin Williams (18 saves / 21 shots)

26 March 2025	ERC Ingolstadt	5–3	Nürnberg Ice Tigers	Saturn Arena, Ingolstadt	Recap
No scoring		First period	No scoring
Johannes Krauß – 22:02; Wojciech Stachowiak – 27:21; Leon Hüttl – 39:22		Second period	20:47 – Hayden Shaw; 24:43 – Cole Maier
Leon Hüttl – 52:46; Wayne Simpson – 56:24		Third period	53:43 – Constantin Braun (PP)
Christian Heljanko (23 saves / 26 shots)		Goalie stats	Leon Hungerecker (36 saves / 41 shots)

28 March 2025	Nürnberg Ice Tigers	0–6	ERC Ingolstadt	Arena Nürnberger Versicherung, Nuremberg	Recap
No scoring		First period	08:39 – Myles Powell (PP); 10:55 – Enrico Henriquez Morales; 17:00 – Wojciech Stachowiak; 19:08 – Abbott Girduckis
No scoring		Second period	36:02 – Wojciech Stachowiak; 37:12 – Kenny Agostino
No scoring		Third period	No scoring
Leon Hungerecker (10 saves / 14 shots)		Goalie stats	Christian Heljanko (21 saves / 21 shots)

Ingolstadt won series 4–2

==== Eisbären Berlin vs Straubing Tigers ====
16 March 2025	Eisbären Berlin	5–1	Straubing Tigers	Uber Arena, Berlin	Recap
Zach Boychuk – 15:54		First period	No scoring
Lean Bergmann (SH) – 25:28; Ty Ronning – 38:11		Second period	No scoring
Marcel Noebels – 42:10; Kai Wissmann – 55:08		Third period	45:50 – Travis St. Denis
Jonas Stettmer (25 saves / 26 shots)		Goalie stats	Zane McIntyre (12 saves / 16 shots)

19 March 2025	Straubing Tigers	2–4	Eisbären Berlin	Eisstadion am Pulverturm, Straubing	Recap
No scoring		First period	No scoring
Joshua Samanski (PP) – 22:19; Travis St. Denis – 29:18		Second period	23:19 – Liam Kirk; 25:12 – Zach Boychuk (PP); 29:03 – Marcel Noebels
No scoring		Third period	59:50 – Gabriel Fontaine (EN)
Zane McIntyre (20 saves / 24 shots)		Goalie stats	Jonas Stettmer (38 saves / 40 shots)

21 March 2025	Eisbären Berlin	1–2	Straubing Tigers	Uber Arena, Berlin	Recap
No scoring		First period	No scoring
Liam Kirk – 21:42		Second period	No scoring
No scoring		Third period	41:34 – Mike Connolly; 45:16 – Philip Samuelsson
Jonas Stettmer (38 saves / 40 shots)		Goalie stats	Florian Bugl (25 saves / 26 shots)

23 March 2025	Straubing Tigers	3–4	2OT	Eisbären Berlin	Eisstadion am Pulverturm, Straubing	Recap
No scoring		First period		06:51 – Liam Kirk; 10:25 – Gabriel Fontaine (PP)
Josh Melnick (PP) – 22:57; Tim Fleischer (PP) – 39:56		Second period		35:00 – Kai Wissmann (SH)
Justin Scott (PP) – 50:14		Third period		No scoring
No scoring		Second overtime period		83:08 – Korbinian Geibel
Florian Bugl (25 saves / 29 shots)		Goalie stats		Jonas Stettmer (56 saves / 59 shots)

25 March 2025	Eisbären Berlin	4–1	Straubing Tigers	Uber Arena, Berlin	Recap
Ty Ronning (PP) – 05:34		First period	No scoring
Gabriel Fontaine – 27:30		Second period	No scoring
Ty Ronning – 46:31; Ty Ronning (EA) – 57:35		Third period	45:50 – Mario Zimmermann
Jonas Stettmer (31 saves / 32 shots)		Goalie stats	Florian Bugl (20 saves / 24 shots)

Berlin won series 4–1

==== Fischtown Pinguins vs Kölner Haie ====
16 March 2025	Fischtown Pinguins	0–5	Kölner Haie	Eisarena Bremerhaven, Bremerhaven	Recap
No scoring		First period	16:13 – Brady Austin
No scoring		Second period	22:52 – Gregor MacLeod (PP); 35:33 – Parker Tuomie (PP)
No scoring		Third period	52:39 – Louis-Marc Aubry (EN); 59:20 – Josh Currie
Kristers Gudļevskis		Goalie stats	Július Hudáček

18 March 2025	Kölner Haie	5–2	Fischtown Pinguins	Lanxess Arena, Cologne	Recap
Josh Currie – 09:07; Alexandre Grenier – 18:14		First period	08:34 – Žiga Jeglič (EA)
Josh Currie – 22:46; Brady Austin – 33:19		Second period	24:40 – Max Görtz
Alexandre Grenier (EN) – 58:57		Third period	No scoring
Július Hudáček (25 saves / 27 shots)		Goalie stats	Kristers Gudļevskis (25 saves / 30 shots)

21 March 2025	Fischtown Pinguins	2–3	OT	Kölner Haie	Eisarena Bremerhaven, Bremerhaven	Recap
No scoring		First period		01:40 – Moritz Müller
No scoring		Second period		24:02 – Marco Münzenberger
Miha Verlič – 40:28; Phillip Bruggisser (PP) – 51:32		Third period		No scoring
No scoring		First overtime period		61:08 – Marco Münzenberger
Kristers Gudļevskis (25 saves / 28 shots)		Goalie stats		Július Hudáček (28 saves / 30 shots)

24 March 2025	Kölner Haie	2–5	Fischtown Pinguins	Lanxess Arena, Cologne	Recap
Gregor MacLeod (PP) – 11:45; Juhani Tyrväinen (PP) – 15:27		First period	No scoring
No scoring		Second period	23:44 – Ross Mauermann (PP); 31:45 – Christian Wejse (PP)
No scoring		Third period	46:07 – Felix Maegaard Scheel; 53:06 – Žiga Jeglič; 59:11 – Miha Verlič
Július Hudáček (20 saves / 25 shots)		Goalie stats	Kristers Gudļevskis (29 saves / 30 shots)

26 March 2025	Fischtown Pinguins	4–3	Kölner Haie	Eisarena Bremerhaven, Bremerhaven	Recap
Matthew Abt – 11:28; Nicholas Jensen – 15:16		First period	14:02 – Alexandre Grenier (PP)
Jan Urbas (PP) – 38:32		Second period	35:49 – Alexandre Grenier
Jan Urbas (PP) – 51:04		Third period	49:08 – Josh Currie (PP)
Kristers Gudļevskis (24 saves / 27 shots)		Goalie stats	Tobias Ančička (32 saves / 36 shots)

28 March 2025	Kölner Haie	3–1	Fischtown Pinguins	Lanxess Arena, Cologne	Recap
No scoring		First period	No scoring
No scoring		Second period	37:18 – Max Görtz
Tim Wohlgemuth – 49:04; Alexandre Grenier – 58:03; Alexandre Grenier (EN) – 59:22		Third period	No scoring
Tobias Ančička (27 saves / 28 shots)		Goalie stats	Kristers Gudļevskis (30 saves / 33 shots)

Cologne won series 4–2

==== Adler Mannheim vs EHC Red Bull München ====
16 March 2025	Adler Mannheim	2–1	OT	EHC Red Bull München	SAP Arena, Mannheim	Recap
Nick Cicek – 06:51		First period		No scoring
No scoring		Second period		24:22 – Markus Eisenschmid (PP)
No scoring		Third period		No scoring
Tom Kühnhackl – 67:07		First overtime period		No scoring
Arno Tiefensee (22 saves / 34 shots)		Goalie stats		Mathias Niederberger (20 saves / 21 shots)

19 March 2025	EHC Red Bull München	5–2	Adler Mannheim	SAP Garden, Munich	Recap
Taro Hirose – 10:47		First period	17:06 – Kristian Reichel
Filip Varejcka – 25:24; Tobias Rieder – 32:04		Second period	No scoring
Markus Eisenschmid (PP) – 41:51; Maximilian Kastner (SH) – 55:42		Third period	46:05 – Tobias Fohrler
Evan Fitzpatrick (18 saves / 20 shots)		Goalie stats	Arno Tiefensee (24 saves / 29 shots)

21 March 2025	Adler Mannheim	2–5	EHC Red Bull München	SAP Arena, Mannheim	Recap
Tom Kühnhackl – 13:15		First period	00:54 – Markus Eisenschmid; 05:58 – Yasin Ehliz; 15:09 – Chris DeSousa
No scoring		Second period	34:57 – Yasin Ehliz (PP)
Leon Gawanke (PP) – 55:25		Third period	41:24 – Tobias Rieder (PP)
Arno Tiefensee (18 saves / 23 shots)		Goalie stats	Evan Fitzpatrick (28 saves / 30 shots)

23 March 2025	EHC Red Bull München	0–2	Adler Mannheim	SAP Garden, Munich	Recap
No scoring		First period	02:43 – Marc Michaelis (PP)
No scoring		Second period	35:52 – Jyrki Jokipakka
No scoring		Third period	No scoring
Evan Fitzpatrick (21 saves / 23 shots)		Goalie stats	Arno Tiefensee (37 saves / 37 shots)

25 March 2025	Adler Mannheim	4–3	2OT	EHC Red Bull München	SAP Arena, Mannheim	Recap
John Gilmour (PP) – 08:19		First period		04:27 – Filip Varejcka
No scoring		Second period		22:19 – Nico Krämmer
Matthias Plachta (PP) – 42:01; Kris Bennett – 44:12		Third period		51:59 – Adam Brooks
Matthias Plachta – 85:41		Second overtime period		No scoring
Arno Tiefensee (41 saves / 44 shots)		Goalie stats		Evan Fitzpatrick (38 saves / 42 shots)

28 March 2025	EHC Red Bull München	1–2	Adler Mannheim	SAP Garden, Munich	Recap
No scoring		First period	03:13 – Kristian Reichel
No scoring		Second period	27:18 – Marc Michaelis
Andreas Eder (EA) – 58:13		Third period	No scoring
Evan Fitzpatrick (21 saves / 23 shots)		Goalie stats	Arno Tiefensee (38 saves / 39 shots)

Mannheim won series 4–2

=== Semifinals ===
The quarterfinals will be played between 1 and 14 April 2025 in a best-of-seven mode.

==== ERC Ingolstadt vs Kölner Haie ====
2 April 2025	ERC Ingolstadt	7–0	Kölner Haie	Saturn Arena, Ingolstadt	Recap
Wayne Simpson – 03:49; Daniel Schmölz – 04:24; Daniel Pietta – 14:48; Wojciech Stachowiak – 18:57		First period	No scoring
Alex Breton – 21:34		Second period	No scoring
Austen Keating (PP) – 44:58; Riley Sheen – 58:32		Third period	No scoring
Christian Heljanko (18 saves / 18 shots)		Goalie stats	Július Hudáček (4 saves / 9 shots)

4 April 2025	Kölner Haie	5–2	ERC Ingolstadt	Lanxess Arena, Cologne	Recap
No scoring		First period	No scoring
Maximilian Kammerer – 21:01; Alexandre Grenier (PP) – 29:07; Maximilian Kammerer – 34:20		Second period	26:46 – Kenny Agostino
Alexandre Grenier (EN) – 56:40; Alexandre Grenier (EN) – 57:20		Third period	50:14 – Austen Keating
Július Hudáček (27 saves / 29 shots)		Goalie stats	Christian Heljanko (14 saves / 17 shots)

6 April 2025	ERC Ingolstadt	0–2	Kölner Haie	Saturn Arena, Ingolstadt	Recap
No scoring		First period	07:35 – Josh Currie (PP)
No scoring		Second period	No scoring
No scoring		Third period	59:59 – Frederik Storm (EN)
Christian Heljanko (10 saves / 12 shots)		Goalie stats	Július Hudáček (39 saves / 39 shots)

9 April 2025	Kölner Haie	2–1	ERC Ingolstadt	Lanxess Arena, Cologne	Recap
Maximilian Kammerer – 14:59		First period	No scoring
No scoring		Second period	No scoring
Gregor MacLeod – 49:18		Third period	52:55 – Leon Hüttl
Július Hudáček (43 saves / 44 shots)		Goalie stats	Christian Heljanko (23 saves / 25 shots)

11 April 2025	ERC Ingolstadt	3–0	Kölner Haie	Saturn Arena, Ingolstadt	Recap
Daniel Schmölz – 19:10		First period	No scoring
Austen Keating (PP) – 36:51		Second period	No scoring
Mat Bodie (EN) – 57:39		Third period	No scoring
Christian Heljanko (18 saves / 18 shots)		Goalie stats	Július Hudáček (23 saves / 26 shots)

14 April 2025	Kölner Haie	3–2	OT	ERC Ingolstadt	Lanxess Arena, Cologne	Recap
Moritz Müller – 14:59		First period		06:19 – Austen Keating; 09:24 – Wayne Simpson
No scoring		Second period		No scoring
Gregor MacLeod – 45:53		Third period		No scoring
Justin Schütz – 69:04		First overtime period		No scoring
Július Hudáček (37 saves / 39 shots)		Goalie stats		Christian Heljanko (26 saves / 29 shots)

Cologne won series 4–2

==== Eisbären Berlin vs Adler Mannheim ====
1 April 2025	Eisbären Berlin	3–1	Adler Mannheim	Uber Arena, Berlin	Recap
No scoring		First period	No scoring
Liam Kirk – 21:07		Second period	No scoring
Ty Ronning – 44:37; Frederik Tiffels (EA) – 59:38		Third period	56:52 – Marc Michaelis (PP, EA)
Jake Hildebrand (23 saves / 24 shots)		Goalie stats	Arno Tiefensee (20 saves / 23 shots)

4 April 2025	Adler Mannheim	0–2	Eisbären Berlin	SAP Arena, Mannheim	Recap
No scoring		First period	No scoring
No scoring		Second period	30:21 – Marcel Noebels; 34:43 – Eric Hördler
No scoring		Third period	No scoring
Arno Tiefensee (19 saves / 21 shots)		Goalie stats	Jake Hildebrand (25 saves / 25 shots)

6 April 2025	Eisbären Berlin	5–1	Adler Mannheim	Uber Arena, Berlin	Recap
Leonhard Pföderl (PP) – 15:02		First period	No scoring
Kai Wissmann – 31:52; Ty Ronning (PP) – 38:55		Second period	No scoring
Leonhard Pföderl (EN) – 56:57; Yannick Veilleux (EN) – 59:29		Third period	50:01 – Austin Ortega
Jake Hildebrand (36 saves / 37 shots)		Goalie stats	Arno Tiefensee (14 saves / 17 shots)

8 April 2025	Adler Mannheim	2–6	Eisbären Berlin	SAP Arena, Mannheim	Recap
No scoring		First period	11:11 – Leonhard Pföderl; 18:51 – Frederik Tiffels
Austin Ortega (PP) – 31:04		Second period	27:19 – Ty Ronning
Kristian Reichel – 40:55		Third period	47:55 – Lean Bergmann; 53:48 – Frederik Tiffels; 54:49 – Lean Bergmann
Arno Tiefensee (32 saves / 38 shots)		Goalie stats	Jake Hildebrand (21 saves / 23 shots)

Berlin won series 4–0

=== Final ===
The final was played between 17 and 29 April 2025 in a best-of-seven mode.

17 April 2025	Eisbären Berlin	5–1	Kölner Haie	Uber Arena, Berlin	Recap
Liam Kirk – 00:25		First period	No scoring
Marcel Noebels – 32:20		Second period	No scoring
Kai Wissmann (PP2) – 49:58; Liam Kirk – 50:49; Leonhard Pföderl – 55:32		Third period	23:56 – Alexandre Grenier
Jake Hildebrand (26 saves / 27 shots)		Goalie stats	Július Hudáček (28 saves / 33 shots)

19 April 2025	Kölner Haie	2–1	OT	Eisbären Berlin	Lanxess Arena, Cologne	Recap
Parker Tuomie (PP) – 03:37		First period		No scoring
No scoring		Second period		22:56 – Leonhard Pföderl (PP)
No scoring		Third period		No scoring
Gregor MacLeod – 73:06		First overtime period		No scoring
Július Hudáček (28 saves / 29 shots)		Goalie stats		Jake Hildebrand (29 saves / 31 shots)

21 April 2025	Eisbären Berlin	7–0	Kölner Haie	Uber Arena, Berlin	Recap
Leonhard Pföderl (PP) – 06:42; Leonhard Pföderl (SH) – 09:14		First period	No scoring
Ty Ronning – 21:06; Leonhard Pföderl – 28:54; Yannick Veilleux – 29:10		Second period	No scoring
Lean Bergmann (PP) – 41:24; Jonas Müller (PP) – 56:19		Third period	No scoring
Jake Hildebrand (18 saves / 18 shots)		Goalie stats	Július Hudáček (12 saves / 16 shots)

23 April 2025	Kölner Haie	0–7	Eisbären Berlin	Lanxess Arena, Cologne	Recap
No scoring		First period	09:38 – Liam Kirk; 15:32 – Marcel Noebels
No scoring		Second period	26:39 – Manuel Wiederer; 38:34 – Blaine Byron
No scoring		Third period	41:10 – Ty Ronning; 57:00 – Liam Kirk; 59:12 – Eric Hördler
Július Hudáček (29 saves / 29 shots)		Goalie stats	Jake Hildebrand (28 saves / 35 shots)

25 April 2025	Eisbären Berlin	7–0	Kölner Haie	Uber Arena, Berlin	Recap
Zach Boychuk – 02:52; Gabriel Fontaine – 03:11; Ty Ronning – 07:51; Marcel Noebels – 11:17		First period	No scoring
Yannick Veilleux – 23:45; Zach Boychuk – 29:21		Second period	No scoring
Frederik Tiffels – 53:52		Third period	No scoring
Jake Hildebrand (12 saves / 12 shots)		Goalie stats	Tobias Ančička (20 saves / 25 shots)

Berlin won series 4–1

== Statistics ==
=== Scoring leaders ===
List shows the top skaters sorted by points, then goals.

Player	Team	GP	G	A	Pts	+/−	PIM	POS
(United States) Ty Ronning	Eisbären Berlin	47	37	36	73	+32	19	F
(Germany) Leonhard Pföderl	Eisbären Berlin	51	26	45	71	+24	18	F
(United States) Evan Barratt	Nürnberg Ice Tigers	50	19	43	62	0	45	F
(Canada) Chris DeSousa	EHC Red Bull München	50	27	25	52	+16	74	F
(United States) Matt White	Grizzlys Wolfsburg	52	18	31	49	−9	6	F
(Sweden) Maksim Matushkin	Löwen Frankfurt	50	13	36	49	+2	52	D
(Canada) Tyson Spink	Schwenninger Wild Wings	52	23	25	48	+15	43	F
(Canada) Brendan O'Donnell	Düsseldorfer EG	52	20	28	48	−36	38	F
(Canada) Alex Breton	ERC Ingolstadt	52	20	28	48	+25	22	D
(Germany) Justin Schütz	Kölner Haie	48	26	20	46	+20	32	F

=== Leading goaltenders ===
Only the top five goaltenders, based on save percentage.

Player	Team	TOI	GA	GAA	SA	Sv%	SO
(Latvia) Kristers Gudļevskis	Fischtown Pinguins	1693	54	1.91	713	92.96	5
(Canada) Evan Fitzpatrick	EHC Red Bull München	234	8	2.05	99	92.52	1
(Germany) Maximilian Franzreb	Fischtown Pinguins	1401	53	2.27	634	92.29	2
(Germany) Erik Eder	ERC Ingolstadt	49	1	2.21	11	91.67	0
(Germany) Cody Brenner	Löwen Frankfurt	1098	45	2.46	486	91.53	1

== Awards ==
The awards were announced on 10 March 2025.

Award	Player
Player of the year	(Germany) Leonhard Pföderl
Goaltender of the year	(Latvia) Kristers Gudļevskis
Defenceman of the year	(Canada) Alex Breton
Forward of the year	(Germany) Leonhard Pföderl
Youth player of the year	(Germany) Kevin Bicker
Coach of the year	(Canada) Mark French
Finals MVP	(Canada) Ty Ronning
