= Wojciech Stachowiak =

German-Polish ice hockey player (born 1999)

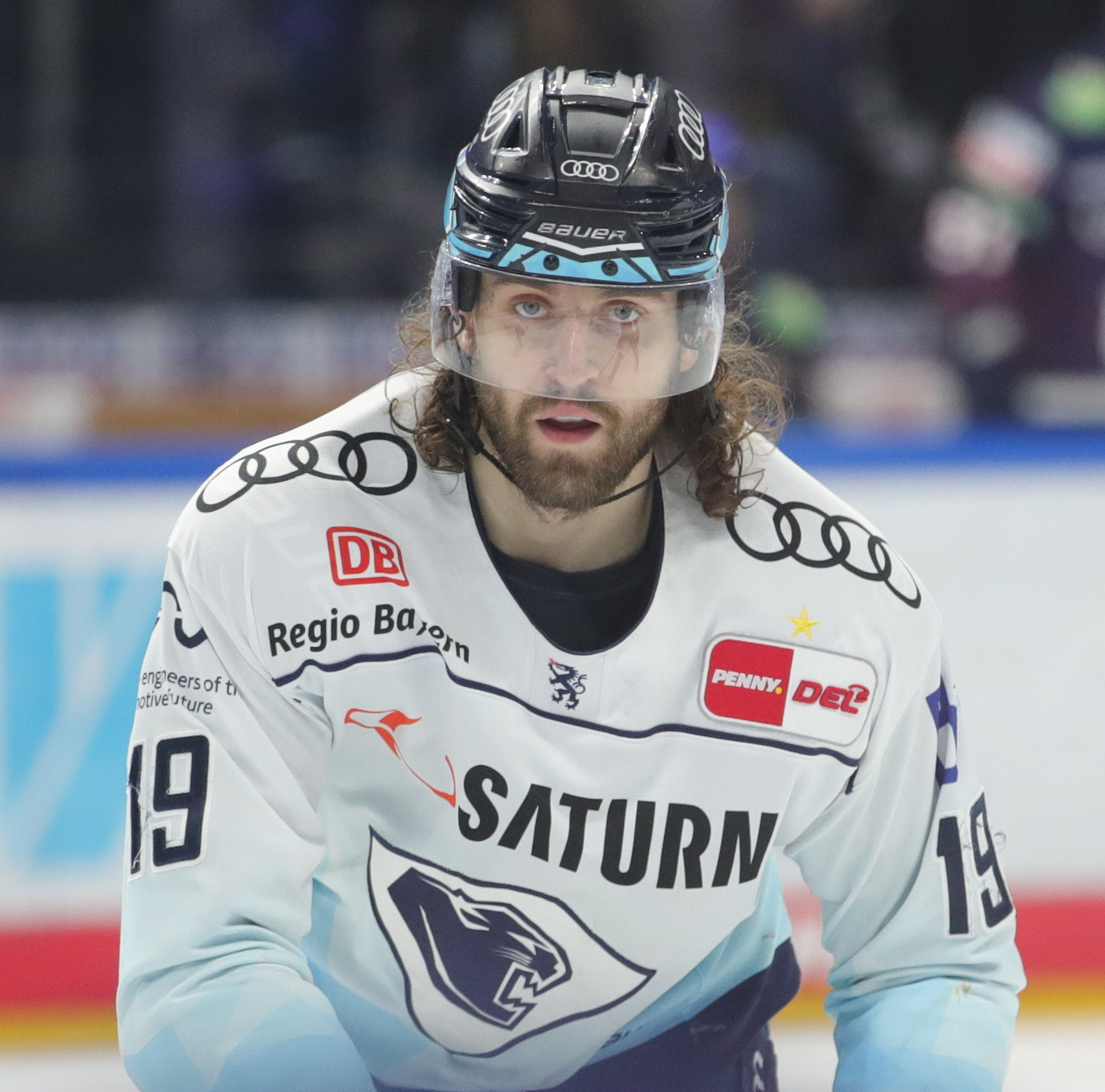
- Stachowiak with ERC Ingolstadt in 2023
- Born: 3 July 1999 (age 27) Gdańsk, Poland
- Height: 185 cm (6 ft 1 in)
- Weight: 85 kg (187 lb; 13 st 5 lb)
- Position: Winger
- Shoots: Left
- SHL team Former teams: Örebro HK; ERC Ingolstadt; Syracuse Crunch; Grand Rapids Griffins
- National team: Germany
- NHL draft: Undrafted
- Playing career: 2020–present

Wojciech Stachowiak (born 3 July 1999) is a German–Polish professional ice hockey player who is a winger for Örebro HK in the Swedish Hockey League (SHL).

== Playing career ==
Stachowiak played college hockey for the Michigan State Spartans from 2018 to 2020.

On 22 May 2025, Stachowiak signed a one-year contract with the Tampa Bay Lightning. On 12 March 2026, Stachowiak was traded to the Detroit Red Wings, alongside Michael Milne, in exchange for Ian Mitchell. Assigned to AHL affiliate, the Grand Rapids Griffins, Stachowiak increased his offensive output posting 15 points through 10 regular season appearances.

As a free agent at the conclusion of his contract with the Red Wings, Stachowiak opted to return to Europe after agreeing to a two-year contract with Swedish club, Örebro HK of the SHL, on 21 August 2026.

== International play ==
Stachowiak represented the Germany national team at the 2026 Winter Olympics, and the 2023, 2024, and 2025 IIHF World Championship.

== Personal life ==
Stachowiak moved from Poland to Germany at age 11.

== Career statistics ==
=== Regular season and playoffs ===
			Regular season					Playoffs
Season	Team	League	GP	G	A	Pts	PIM	GP	G	A	Pts	PIM
2012–13	ES Weißwasser U16	Schüler-BL	4	0	0	0	0	—	—	—	—	—
2013–14	ES Weißwasser U16	Schüler-BL	29	16	13	29	12	—	—	—	—	—
2014–15	Krefelder EV 1981 U16	Schüler-BL	29	27	32	59	8	5	4	1	5	2
2014–15	Krefelder EV 1981 U19	DNL2	2	1	0	1	2	—	—	—	—	—
2015–16	Krefelder EV 1981 U19	DNL	44	15	21	36	12	3	1	2	3	0
2016–17	Jungadler Mannheim U19	DNL	33	19	34	53	12	4	2	3	5	4
2017–18	Jungadler Mannheim U19	DNL	14	13	14	27	22	—	—	—	—	—
2017–18	Central Illinois Flying Aces	USHL	38	9	10	19	14	—	—	—	—	—
2018–19	Michigan State University	NCAA	27	4	0	4	4	—	—	—	—	—
2019–20	Michigan State University	NCAA	13	0	1	1	0	—	—	—	—	—
2019–20	ERC Ingolstadt	DEL	8	0	1	1	4	—	—	—	—	—
2020–21	ERC Ingolstadt	DEL	25	3	3	6	10	5	1	0	1	0
2021–22	ERC Ingolstadt	DEL	47	2	3	5	14	2	0	0	0	0
2021–22	Ravensburg Towerstars	DEL2	5	4	1	5	0	—	—	—	—	—
2022–23	ERC Ingolstadt	DEL	56	16	18	34	13	16	3	2	5	2
2023–24	ERC Ingolstadt	DEL	51	11	17	28	28	7	2	3	5	4
2024–25	ERC Ingolstadt	DEL	52	10	20	30	40	12	6	5	11	11
2025–26	Syracuse Crunch	AHL	38	9	8	17	28	—	—	—	—	—
2025–26	Grand Rapids Griffins	AHL	10	4	11	15	4	8	0	3	3	8
DEL totals			239	42	62	104	109	42	12	10	22	17
AHL totals			48	13	19	32	32	8	0	3	3	8

=== International ===
Year	Team	Event	GP	G	A	Pts	PIM
2023	Germany	WC	10	2	4	6	4
2024	Germany	WC	8	2	7	9	4
2025	Germany	WC	7	3	3	6	2
2026	Germany	OG	2	0	1	1	2
Senior totals			27	7	15	22	12
