= Hudáček =

Hudáček is a Czech and Slovak family name. Notable people with the surname include:

- Július Hudáček (born 1988), Slovak hockey player
- Libor Hudáček (born 1990), Slovak hockey player
- Vladimír Hudáček (born 1971), Czech hockey player
