= Moritz Müller =

German ice hockey player (born 1986)

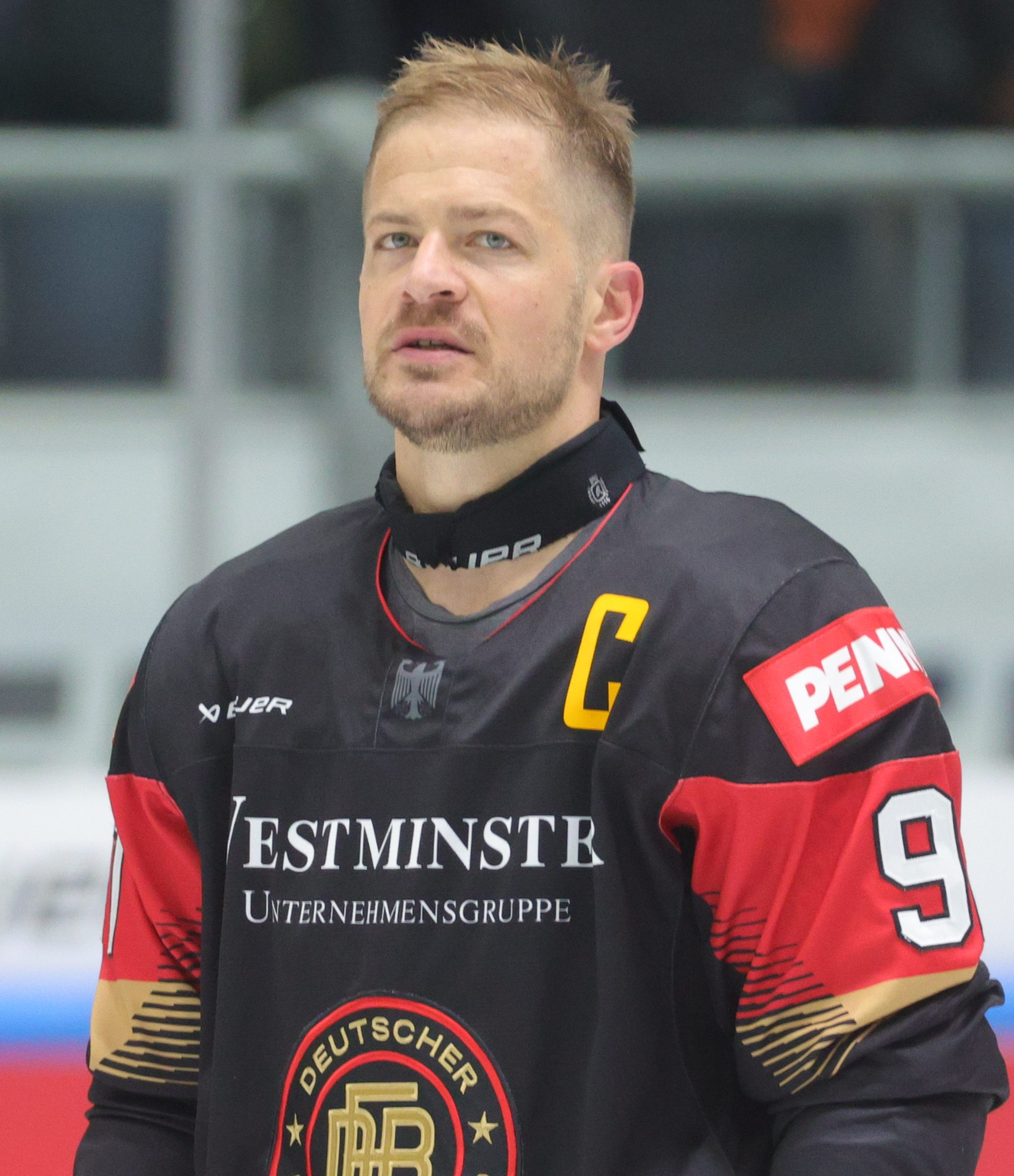
- Müller in 2024
- Born: 19 November 1986 (age 39) Frankfurt am Main, West Germany
- Height: 6 ft 2 in (188 cm)
- Weight: 205 lb (93 kg; 14 st 9 lb)
- Position: Defence
- Shoots: Left
- DEL team: Kölner Haie
- National team: Germany
- NHL draft: Undrafted
- Playing career: 2004–present

Moritz Müller (born 19 November 1986) is a German professional ice hockey player who is a defenceman and captain for Kölner Haie of the Deutsche Eishockey Liga (DEL).

== International career ==
Medal record

Representing Germany

Ice hockey

Olympic Games
Silver medal – second place	2018 Pyeongchang	

World Championships
Silver medal – second place	2023 Finland/Latvia	

He represented Germany at the 2018 IIHF World Championship and won silver.

== Career statistics ==
=== Regular season and playoffs ===
			Regular season					Playoffs
Season	Team	League	GP	G	A	Pts	PIM	GP	G	A	Pts	PIM
2002–03	ES Weißwasser	DNL	22	16	5	21	28	—	—	—	—	—
2002–03	Kölner Haie	DNL	10	0	1	1	16	3	1	0	1	0
2003–04	Kölner Haie	DNL	35	22	38	60	20	4	0	3	3	29
2003–04	Kölner Haie	DEL	2	0	0	0	0	—	—	—	—	—
2004–05	Kölner Haie	DEL	42	0	0	0	36	7	0	1	1	0
2004–05	Essen Mosquitoes	2.GBun	8	1	1	2	4	—	—	—	—	—
2005–06	Kölner Haie	DEL	44	0	3	3	14	9	0	2	2	0
2005–06	Essen Mosquitoes	2.GBun	12	2	7	9	24	—	—	—	—	—
2006–07	Kölner Haie	DEL	44	3	8	11	55	6	0	0	0	2
2007–08	Kölner Haie	DEL	55	2	9	11	61	13	0	3	3	20
2008–09	Kölner Haie	DEL	50	2	11	13	56	—	—	—	—	—
2009–10	Kölner Haie	DEL	56	1	14	15	34	3	0	1	1	14
2010–11	Kölner Haie	DEL	52	1	15	16	58	4	0	0	0	10
2011–12	Kölner Haie	DEL	52	6	16	22	55	6	0	1	1	8
2012–13	Kölner Haie	DEL	52	3	14	17	50	12	0	3	3	10
2013–14	Kölner Haie	DEL	34	2	4	6	59	17	0	3	3	20
2014–15	Kölner Haie	DEL	45	2	10	12	70	—	—	—	—	—
2015–16	Kölner Haie	DEL	52	2	7	9	58	15	1	1	2	26
2016–17	Kölner Haie	DEL	51	0	4	4	40	7	0	0	0	2
2017–18	Kölner Haie	DEL	50	2	11	13	58	6	0	3	3	0
2018–19	Kölner Haie	DEL	35	1	9	10	38	10	0	2	2	20
2019–20	Kölner Haie	DEL	33	0	7	7	40	—	—	—	—	—
2020–21	Kölner Haie	DEL	38	3	8	11	42	—	—	—	—	—
2020–21	Kassel Huskies	DEL2	4	1	4	5	2	—	—	—	—	—
2021–22	Kölner Haie	DEL	50	6	21	27	20	5	1	3	4	4
2022–23	Kölner Haie	DEL	47	3	14	17	16	6	1	2	3	2
2023–24	Kölner Haie	DEL	49	0	10	10	58	3	0	1	1	2
2024–25	Kölner Haie	DEL	52	3	10	13	29	17	2	4	6	20
DEL totals			985	42	205	247	947	146	5	30	30	160

=== International ===
Year	Team	Event	Result	GP	G	A	Pts	PIM
2004	Germany	WJC18 D1	11th	5	3	2	5	4
2005	Germany	WJC	9th	6	0	0	0	24
2006	Germany	WJC D1	11th	5	3	4	7	4
2009	Germany	OGQ	Q	3	0	1	1	2
2009	Germany	WC	15th	6	1	0	1	2
2013	Germany	OGQ	DNQ	3	1	0	1	2
2013	Germany	WC	9th	7	0	0	0	2
2014	Germany	WC	14th	6	0	0	0	2
2015	Germany	WC	10th	7	0	2	2	0
2016	Germany	WC	7th	8	0	3	3	4
2016	Germany	OGQ	Q	3	1	1	2	0
2017	Germany	WC	8th	8	0	3	3	8
2018	Germany	OG	2nd place, silver medalist(s)	7	0	0	0	0
2018	Germany	WC	11th	7	0	1	1	4
2019	Germany	WC	6th	8	0	0	0	2
2021	Germany	WC	4th	10	1	1	2	6
2022	Germany	OG	10th	4	0	1	1	0
2022	Germany	WC	7th	8	0	2	2	4
2023	Germany	WC	2nd place, silver medalist(s)	10	1	5	6	2
2024	Germany	WC	6th	8	0	0	0	4
2026	Germany	OG	6th	5	0	1	1	0
Junior totals				16	6	6	12	32
Senior totals				118	5	21	26	44
