= Michael Kreitl =

German ice hockey player

- Born: December 6, 1975 (age 49) Schongau, Germany
- Height: 6 ft 4 in (193 cm)
- Weight: 227 lb (103 kg; 16 st 3 lb)
- Position: Forward
- Shoots: Left
- 3.GBun team Former teams: EC Peiting; Augsburger Panther
- Playing career: 1993–present

Michael Kreitl (born December 6, 1975) is a German professional ice hockey forward who currently plays for EC Peiting of the German Oberliga.
