= Lean Bergmann =

German ice hockey player (born 1998)

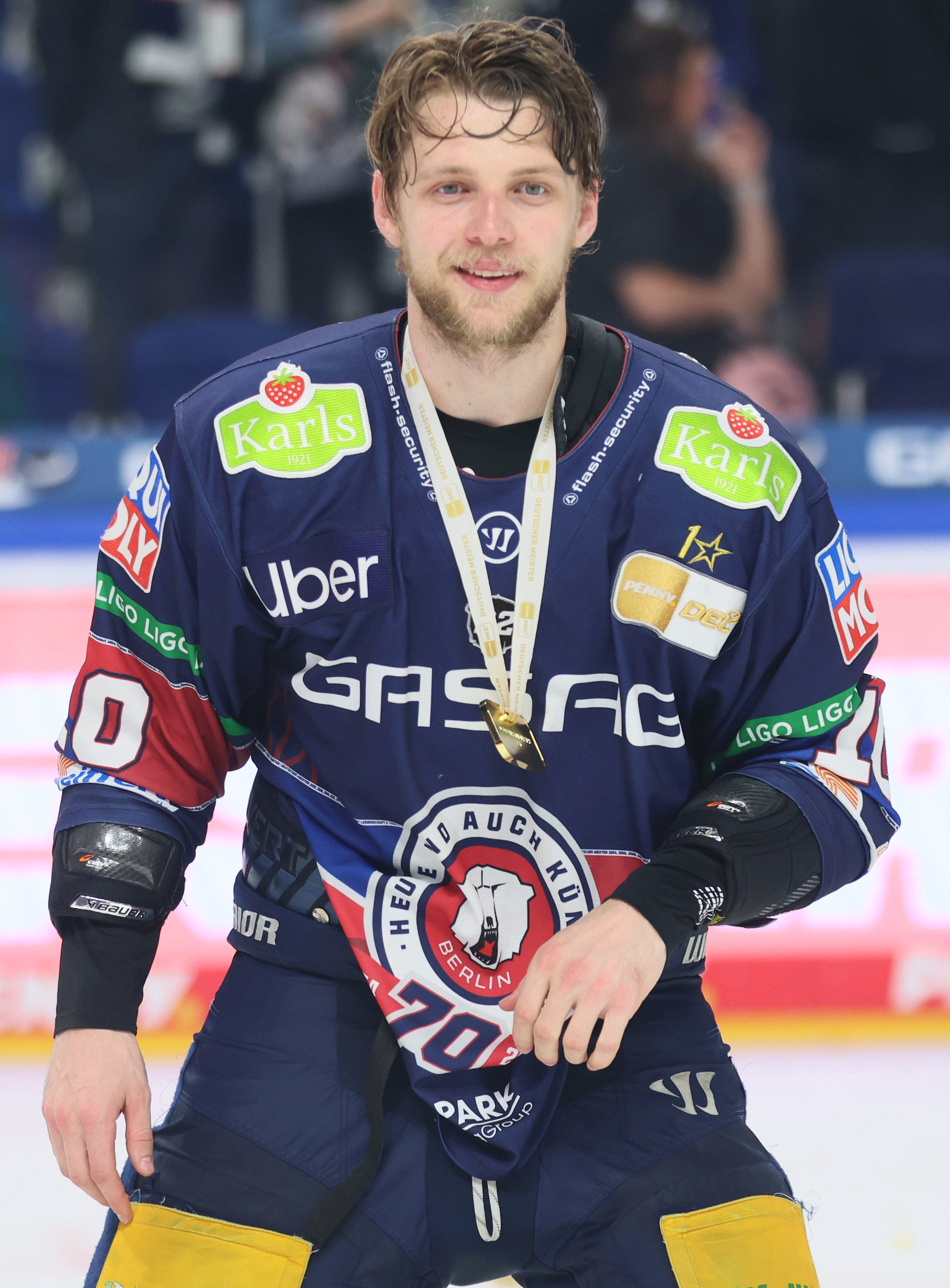
- Bergmann in 2025
- Born: 4 October 1998 (age 27) Hemer, Germany
- Height: 6 ft 2 in (188 cm)
- Weight: 205 lb (93 kg; 14 st 9 lb)
- Position: Forward
- Shoots: Left
- DEL team Former teams: Eisbären Berlin; Iserlohn Roosters; San Jose Sharks; Adler Mannheim
- National team: Germany
- NHL draft: Undrafted
- Playing career: 2018–present

Lean Bergmann (born 4 October 1998) is a German professional ice hockey forward who is currently playing with Eisbären Berlin in the Deutsche Eishockey Liga (DEL). He has previously played with the San Jose Sharks in the National Hockey League (NHL). He also plays internationally for the German national team.

== Playing career ==
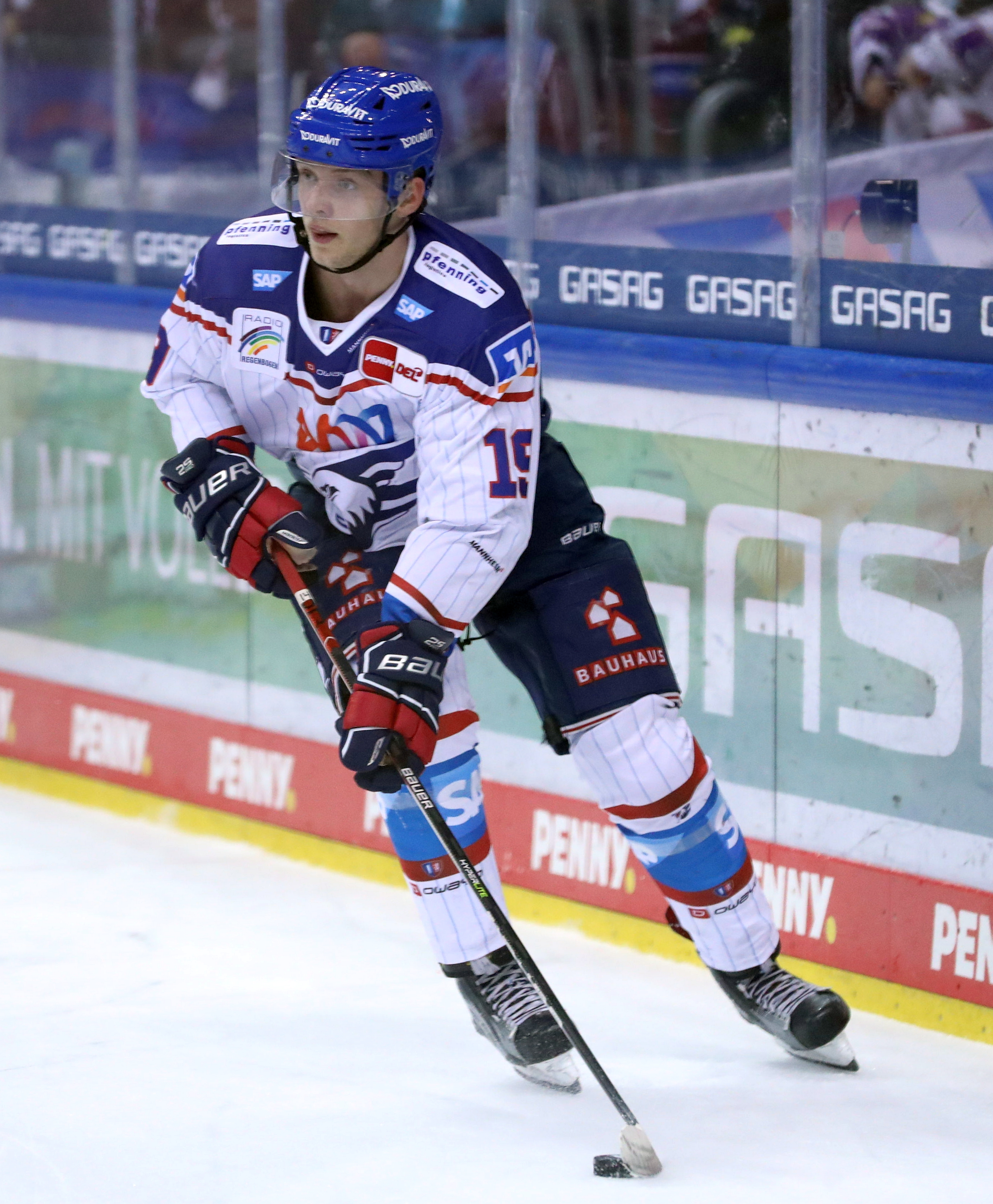
Lean Bergmann with Adler Mannheim in 2021

Bergmann played at the under-16 level in his native Germany with Mannheimer ERC. As a 15-year-old, Bergmann opted to further his development by moving to Sweden and playing in the J18 and J20 Elit junior levels with Frölunda HC and Almtuna IS.

During the 2015–16 season, Bergmann left Almtuna and Sweden on 4 January 2016 to pursue his North American ambition by signing for the remainder of the season with the Sioux Falls Stampede of the United States Hockey League (USHL).

Following 2 1/2 seasons in the USHL with the Stampede and the Green Bay Gamblers, Bergmann was not selected in his eligible NHL entry draft years. He returned to Germany to embark on his professional career, agreeing to a one-year contract with his hometown club, the Iserlohn Roosters of the top-tiered Deutsche Eishockey Liga (DEL) on 26 July 2018.

In his rookie professional season in 2018–19, Bergmann quickly adapted to show his scoring abilities with the Roosters, finishing third among teammates with 20 goals in 50 regular season games. As the youngest DEL player to reach the 20-goal plateau, Bergman was signed in the midst of the campaign to a lucrative one-year contract with contending club Adler Mannheim for the 2019–20 season on 17 January 2019.

In the off-season, before he could commence his contract with Championship-winning Adler Mannheim, Bergmann gained the interest of NHL teams as an undrafted prospect. On 28 May 2019, he was signed by the San Jose Sharks to a three-year entry-level contract. Bergmann made his NHL debut with the Sharks on 2 October 2019 against the Vegas Golden Knights.

Following his second season within the Sharks organization, having appeared in just 13 games with San Jose, Bergmann was placed on unconditional waivers in order to mutually terminate the remaining year of his contract with the Sharks on 23 July 2021. On 26 July 2021, Bergmann as a free agent returned to the German DEL, re-joining Adler Mannheim on a two-year contract.

At the conclusion of his contract with Mannheim, Bergmann left as a free agent to sign a two-year contract with his third DEL club, Eisbären Berlin, on 10 May 2023.

== International play ==
Bergmann made his senior international debut, representing Germany at the 2019 IIHF World Championship in Slovakia. He finished the tournament scoreless in 5 appearances, as Germany placed 6th.

== Career statistics ==
=== Regular season and playoffs ===
			Regular season					Playoffs
Season	Team	League	GP	G	A	Pts	PIM	GP	G	A	Pts	PIM
2013–14	Frölunda HC	J18	4	1	1	2	0	—	—	—	—	—
2013–14	Frölunda HC	J18 Allsv	5	2	0	2	2	—	—	—	—	—
2014–15	Frölunda HC	J18	11	3	3	6	20	—	—	—	—	—
2014–15	Almtuna IS	J18	8	8	1	9	14	—	—	—	—	—
2014–15	Almtuna IS	J18 Allsv	13	4	9	13	35	—	—	—	—	—
2014–15	Almtuna IS	SWE.2 U20	—	—	—	—	—	2	0	0	0	0
2015–16	Almtuna IS	J18	16	14	10	24	16	—	—	—	—	—
2015–16	Almtuna IS	SWE.2 U20	13	7	8	15	12	—	—	—	—	—
2015–16	Sioux Falls Stampede	USHL	28	5	7	12	25	3	0	0	0	12
2016–17	Sioux Falls Stampede	USHL	41	7	9	16	95	—	—	—	—	—
2017–18	Green Bay Gamblers	USHL	56	11	14	25	132	2	0	0	0	2
2018–19	Iserlohn Roosters	DEL	50	20	9	29	87	—	—	—	—	—
2019–20	San Jose Sharks	NHL	12	0	1	1	4	—	—	—	—	—
2019–20	San Jose Barracuda	AHL	31	8	9	17	49	—	—	—	—	—
2020–21	San Jose Sharks	NHL	1	0	0	0	4	—	—	—	—	—
2020–21	San Jose Barracuda	AHL	32	2	5	7	37	—	—	—	—	—
2021–22	Adler Mannheim	DEL	32	9	5	14	36	—	—	—	—	—
2022–23	Iserlohn Roosters	DEL	26	4	7	11	36	—	—	—	—	—
2022–23	Adler Mannheim	DEL	6	3	3	6	11	10	1	0	1	26
2023–24	Eisbären Berlin	DEL	15	3	3	6	8	14	2	2	4	36
2024–25	Eisbären Berlin	DEL	48	10	11	21	36	12	4	1	5	10
DEL totals			177	49	38	87	214	36	7	3	10	72
NHL totals			13	0	1	1	8	—	—	—	—	—

=== International ===
Year	Team	Event	Result	GP	G	A	Pts	PIM
2019	Germany	WC	6th	5	0	0	0	0
2021	Germany	WC	4th	6	1	0	1	0
2022	Germany	OG	10th	2	0	1	1	2
Senior totals				13	1	1	2	2

== Awards and honours ==
Award	Year
DEL
Champion (Eisbären Berlin)	2024, 2025, 2026
