= Reinhold Bocklet =

German politician (1943–2025)

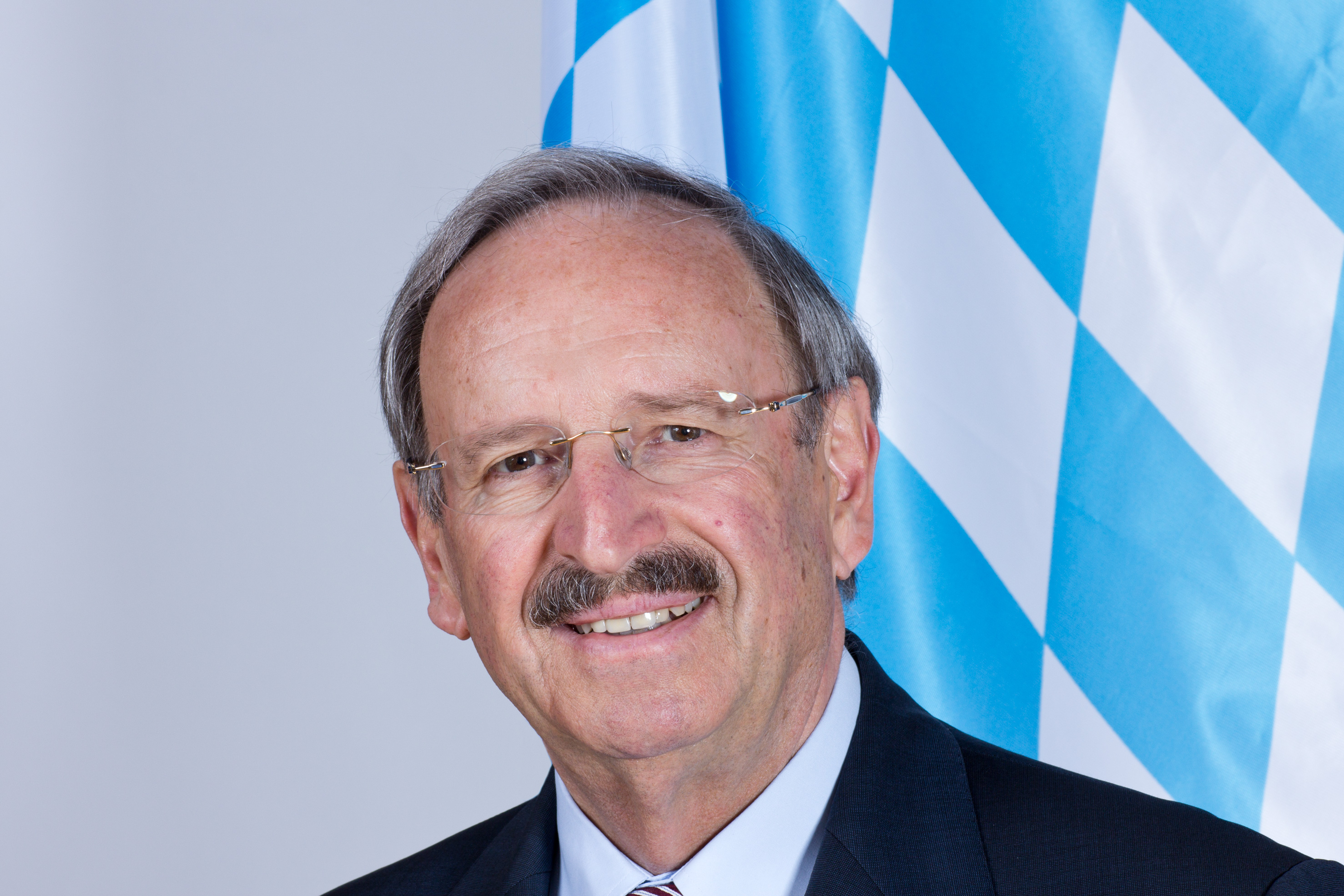
Bocklet in 2012

Reinhold Bocklet (5 April 1943 – 23 August 2025) was a German politician who was a representative of the Christian Social Union of Bavaria.

== Life and career ==
Bocklet was born in Schongau, Gau Munich-Upper Bavaria on 5 April 1943. He was Vice President of the Landtag of Bavaria from 2009. He died on 23 August 2025, at the age of 82.

== See also ==
- List of Bavarian Christian Social Union politicians
