= Ryan Stoa =

American ice hockey player (born 1987)

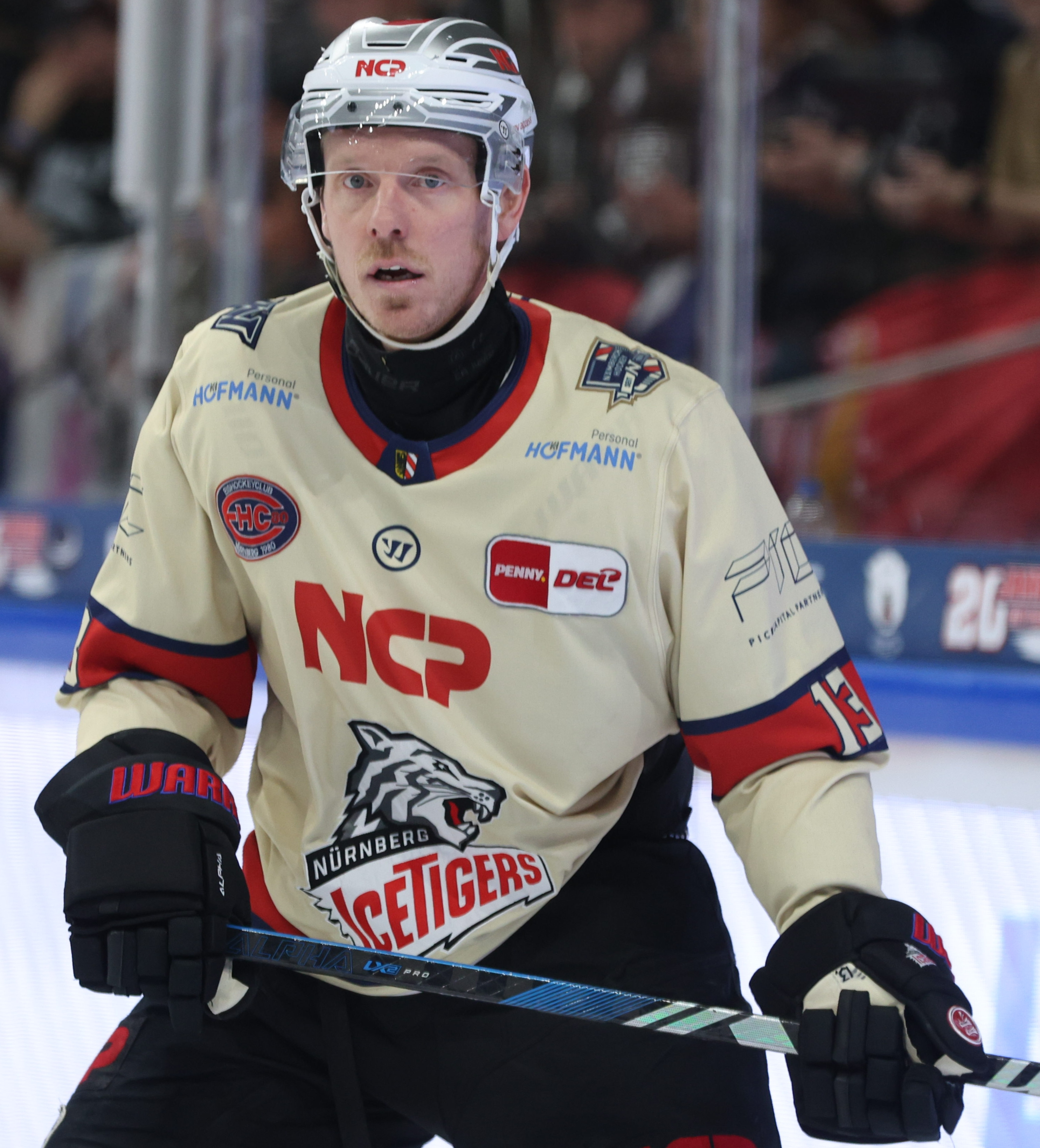
- Stoa with the Nürnberg Ice Tigers in 2025
- Born: April 13, 1987 (age 39) Bloomington, Minnesota, U.S.
- Height: 6 ft 3 in (191 cm)
- Weight: 200 lb (91 kg; 14 st 4 lb)
- Position: Left wing
- Shoots: Left
- team Former teams: Free agent Colorado Avalanche; Washington Capitals; Metallurg Novokuznetsk; Neftekhimik Nizhnekamsk; Spartak Moscow; Traktor Chelyabinsk; Örebro HK; HV71; Djurgårdens IF; Nürnberg Ice Tigers
- National team: United States
- NHL draft: 34th overall, 2005; Colorado Avalanche
- Playing career: 2009–present

Ryan James Stoa (born April 13, 1987) is an American professional ice hockey left wing who is currently an unrestricted free agent. He most recently played under contract with the Nürnberg Ice Tigers of the Deutsche Eishockey Liga (DEL).

== Playing career ==
=== Amateur ===
Stoa was drafted in the 2nd round (34th overall) in the 2005 NHL entry draft by the Colorado Avalanche. Prior to being drafted, Ryan played high school hockey at Bloomington Kennedy High School, earning All-Lake Conference Honorable Mention honors during the 2002–03 season. He was then selected to the U.S. Development Program playing in the Under 17 and 18 National Team from 2003–2005.

Stoa committed to play collegiate hockey for the University of Minnesota in the Western Collegiate Hockey Association. In 2005–06, his freshman year, Stoa finished second to Phil Kessel in freshman scoring with 25 points for the Golden Gophers. At the start of the 2007–08 season, in his junior year, Stoa was redshirted when he suffered a season-ending knee injury. In the following season, Stoa returned as the Gophers captain to lead the WCHA in scoring with 46 points in 36 games to be named the Gophers Most Valuable Player. Stoa was also selected to the WCHA First All-Star Team and named first-team All-American by the American Hockey Coaches Association, College Hockey News and Inside College Hockey. On March 27, 2009, Stoa forwent his senior year and signed a two-year, entry-level contract with the Colorado Avalanche.

=== Professional ===
Despite making an impression with the Avalanche in the pre-season, Stoa was assigned to the Avalanche's AHL affiliate, the Lake Erie Monsters to begin the 2009–10 season. On October 13, 2009, he scored his first professional goal with Lake Erie against the San Antonio Rampage in a 4–1 defeat. Stoa made his NHL debut with the Avalanche against the Calgary Flames on December 13, 2009. In his fifth recall to the Avalanche, Stoa scored his first NHL goal in a 5–2 defeat to the Chicago Blackhawks on April 9, 2010. Stoa finished the season scoring 40 points with the Monsters, co-leading the AHL with 23 goals among rookies.

On July 7, 2012, Stoa signed as a free agent to a one-year deal with the Washington Capitals. Assigned to AHL affiliate, the Hershey Bears, for the 2012–13 season, Stoa missed two-months to injury before returning to finish with 19 points in 46 games. On April 15, 2013, Stoa was re-signed by the Capitals on a one-year extension.

For a second successive season within the Capitals organization, Stoa was assigned to the Bears to begin the 2013–14 season. In 67 games, Stoa matched his career high 40 points from his rookie campaign and was recalled by the Capitals in the latter half of the season. He made his debut with Washington, marking a return to the NHL after a two-year absence, in a 6–4 defeat to the Philadelphia Flyers on March 5, 2014. In his three-game stint with the Capital, Stoa was scoreless.

On July 15, 2014, Stoa opted to sign abroad as a free agent on a one-year deal with Russian club, Metallurg Novokuznetsk of the KHL. In his debut season, Stoa established himself amongst the forwards, contributing with 15 goals and 30 points in 60 games. He was signed to a one-year extension during the 2014–15 season on February 27, 2015.

In the following 2015–16 season, Stoa was elevated to the leadership group amongst Metallurg. Despite the club languishing in the standings, he was leading the club with 15 goals in just 33 games before he was traded to Neftekhimik Nizhnekamsk for financial considerations on November 21, 2015. Following the 2015–16 season, he transferred from Nizhnekamsk to fellow KHL team HC Spartak Moscow.

Following the 2017–18 season, his second with Spartak, Stoa left as a free agent to sign a one-year contract with his fourth KHL club, Traktor Chelyabinsk on May 23, 2018.

After five well travelled seasons in the KHL, Stoa left Russia as a free agent, opting to continue his career in Sweden by agreeing to a one-year contract with Örebro HK of the SHL on July 15, 2019.

As a free agent heading into the start of the 2020–21 season, Stoa opted to remain in the SHL, signing with HV71 on December 2, 2020. After 11 scoreless games with HV71, Stoa was released from his contract and transferred to fellow SHL club, Djurgårdens IF. He made 13 appearances, posting 3 goals and 8 points, before leaving the club following a first-round playoff exit.

On June 30, 2021, Stoa left Sweden and signed a one-year contract with German club, Nürnberg Ice Tigers of the DEL.

== International play ==
Medal record

Representing United States

Ice hockey

World Junior Championships
Bronze medal – third place	2007 Mora	

IIHF U18 Championships
Gold medal – first place	2005 České Budějovice	

A part of the U.S. development program, Stoa was named to the United States Team for the 2005 U18 World Championships. Using his imposing frame, Stoa recorded 3 assists in 6 games to help the U.S. capture Gold. Stoa was also named to the U.S. Team for the 2007 World Junior Championships in Mora, Sweden. Stoa played a checking role with the Americans, and scored 2 points in 7 games to help earn Bronze.

== Career statistics ==
=== Regular season and playoffs ===
			Regular season					Playoffs
Season	Team	League	GP	G	A	Pts	PIM	GP	G	A	Pts	PIM
2002–03	Bloomington Kennedy High School	HS-MN		14	22	36		—	—	—	—	—
2003–04	U.S. NTDP U17	USDP	18	9	8	17		—	—	—	—	—
2003–04	U.S. NTDP U18	NAHL	42	10	12	22	26	—	—	—	—	—
2004–05	U.S. NTDP U18	NAHL	15	10	13	23	20	—	—	—	—	—
2004–05	U.S. NTDP U18	USDP	23	4	11	15	16	—	—	—	—	—
2005–06	University of Minnesota	WCHA	41	10	15	25	43	—	—	—	—	—
2006–07	University of Minnesota	WCHA	41	12	12	24	44	—	—	—	—	—
2007–08	University of Minnesota	WCHA	2	1	1	2	2	—	—	—	—	—
2008–09	University of Minnesota	WCHA	36	24	22	46	76	—	—	—	—	—
2009–10	Lake Erie Monsters	AHL	54	23	17	40	42	—	—	—	—	—
2009–10	Colorado Avalanche	NHL	12	2	1	3	0	1	0	0	0	2
2010–11	Lake Erie Monsters	AHL	48	16	17	33	55	7	1	0	1	4
2010–11	Colorado Avalanche	NHL	25	2	2	4	20	—	—	—	—	—
2011–12	Lake Erie Monsters	AHL	75	16	20	36	65	—	—	—	—	—
2012–13	Hershey Bears	AHL	46	11	8	19	43	4	1	0	1	0
2013–14	Hershey Bears	AHL	67	16	24	40	51	—	—	—	—	—
2013–14	Washington Capitals	NHL	3	0	0	0	0	—	—	—	—	—
2014–15	Metallurg Novokuznetsk	KHL	60	15	15	30	40	—	—	—	—	—
2015–16	Metallurg Novokuznetsk	KHL	33	15	8	23	12	—	—	—	—	—
2015–16	Neftekhimik Nizhnekamsk	KHL	20	3	3	6	8	2	0	1	1	0
2016–17	Spartak Moscow	KHL	57	22	14	36	60	—	—	—	—	—
2017–18	Spartak Moscow	KHL	53	15	15	30	36	4	0	0	0	0
2018–19	Traktor Chelyabinsk	KHL	59	11	16	27	30	—	—	—	—	—
2019–20	Örebro HK	SHL	52	19	18	37	34	—	—	—	—	—
2020–21	HV71	SHL	11	0	0	0	4	—	—	—	—	—
2020–21	Djurgårdens IF	SHL	13	3	5	8	4	3	0	0	0	0
2021–22	Nürnberg Ice Tigers	DEL	46	15	18	33	36	—	—	—	—	—
2022–23	Nürnberg Ice Tigers	DEL	32	14	4	18	18	2	0	0	0	2
2023–24	Nürnberg Ice Tigers	DEL	52	17	13	30	20	2	0	2	2	0
2024–25	Nürnberg Ice Tigers	DEL	52	12	15	27	31	9	3	3	6	6
NHL totals			40	4	3	7	20	1	0	0	0	2
KHL totals			282	81	71	152	186	6	0	1	1	0
DEL totals			182	58	50	108	105	13	3	5	8	8

=== International ===
Year	Team	Event	Result	GP	G	A	Pts	PIM
2005	United States	WJC18	1st place, gold medalist(s)	6	0	3	3	2
2007	United States	WJC	3rd place, bronze medalist(s)	7	1	1	2	8
2018	United States	OG	7th	5	0	0	0	0
Junior totals				13	1	4	5	10
Senior totals				5	0	0	0	0

== Awards and honors ==
Award	Year
College
WCHA First All-Star Team	2008–09
AHCA West First-Team All-American	2008–09
