= The Hangman's Daughter =

Novel by Oliver Pötzsch

- The cover of the book
- Author: Oliver Pötzsch
- Original title: Die Henkerstochter
- Translator: Lee Chadeayne
- Illustrator: Ben Gibson
- Language: German
- Series: The Hangman's Daughter
- Genre: Historical novel
- Publisher: Ullstein Taschenbuch
- Publication date: 2008
- Publication place: Germany
- English publication date: 2010

The Hangman's Daughter (original title in German: Die Henkerstochter) is a novel by Oliver Pötzsch. First published in Germany by Ullstein Verlag in 2008, it was translated into English and issued digitally under the AmazonCrossing imprint in 2010. A paper edition was released in English by Houghton Mifflin Harcourt in 2010.

The book is set beginning in 1659, while its prologue briefly recounts events from 1624.

The characters continue in the sequels The Dark Monk (2009) (German: Die Henkerstochter und der schwarze Mönch), The Beggar King (2010) (German: Die Henkerstochter und der König der Bettler), The Poisoned Pilgrim (German: Der Hexer und die Henkerstochter) (2012), The Werewolf of Bamberg (2015) (German: Die Henkerstochter und der Teufel von Bamberg) and The Play of Death (2017) (German: Die Henkerstochter und das Spiel des Todes) and The Council of Twelve (2018) (German: Die Henkerstochter und der Rat der Zwölf). The most recent novel in the series is The Hangman's Daughter and the Curse of the Plague (German: Die Henkerstochter und der Fluch der Pest) (2020).

The series had sold over 800,000 copies in all formats by the time the fourth title in the series, The Poisoned Pilgrim, was published in 2012.

The primary setting for each of the books in the series is the Bavarian town of Schongau, which is located along the River Lech, between Landsberg am Lech and Füssen. The main entrance to the town is the Hof Gate, inside of which live the respected tradesmen, hence the houses look sturdier and are built exclusively of stone. Those with wealth had been able to move away from the pungent tanners' quarter, on the banks of the Lech, or the butchers' quarter to the east.

== Main characters ==
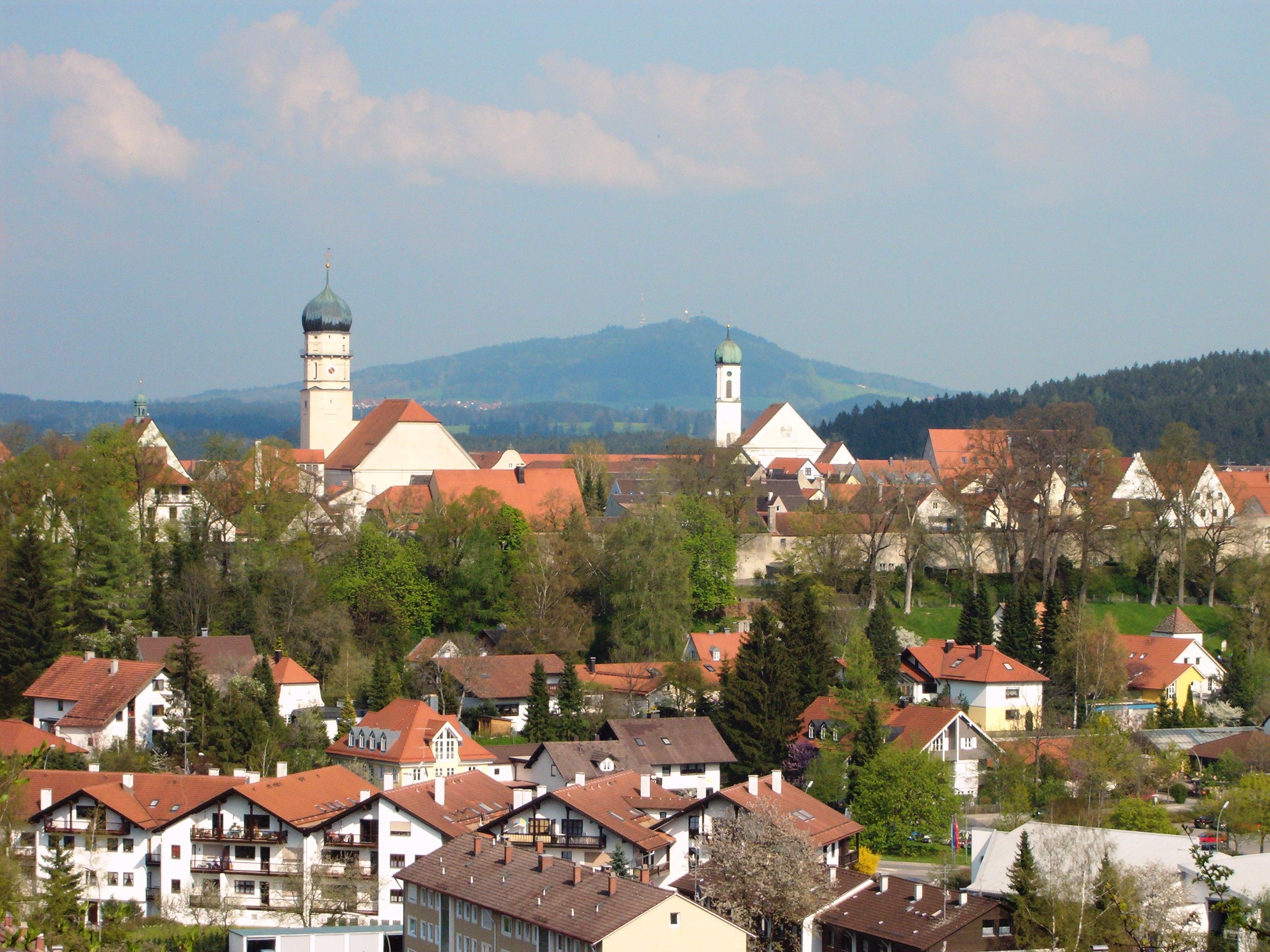
The main setting of the series is Schongau in Bavaria

- Jakob Kuisl, the town's hangman. He is married to Anna Maria. The couple are parents to Magdalena (for whom the book is named) and twins Georg and Barbara
- Simon Fronwieser, the son of the town's physician Bonifaz Fronwieser
- Konrad Weber, the parish priest
- Resl, server at the Goldener Stern Inn

=== Aldermen ===
- Johann Lechner, court clerk
- Karl Semer, burgomaster and landlord of the inn
- Matthias Holzhofer, burgomaster
- Johann Püchner, burgomaster
- Wilhelm Hardenberg, superintendent of the Holy Ghost almshouse
- Jakob Schreevogl, stovemaker and trial witness. He is married to Maria. They are guardians of Clara
- Michael Berchtholdt, baker and trial witness
- Georg Augustin, wagon driver and trial witness
