= Július Hudáček =

Slovak ice hockey player

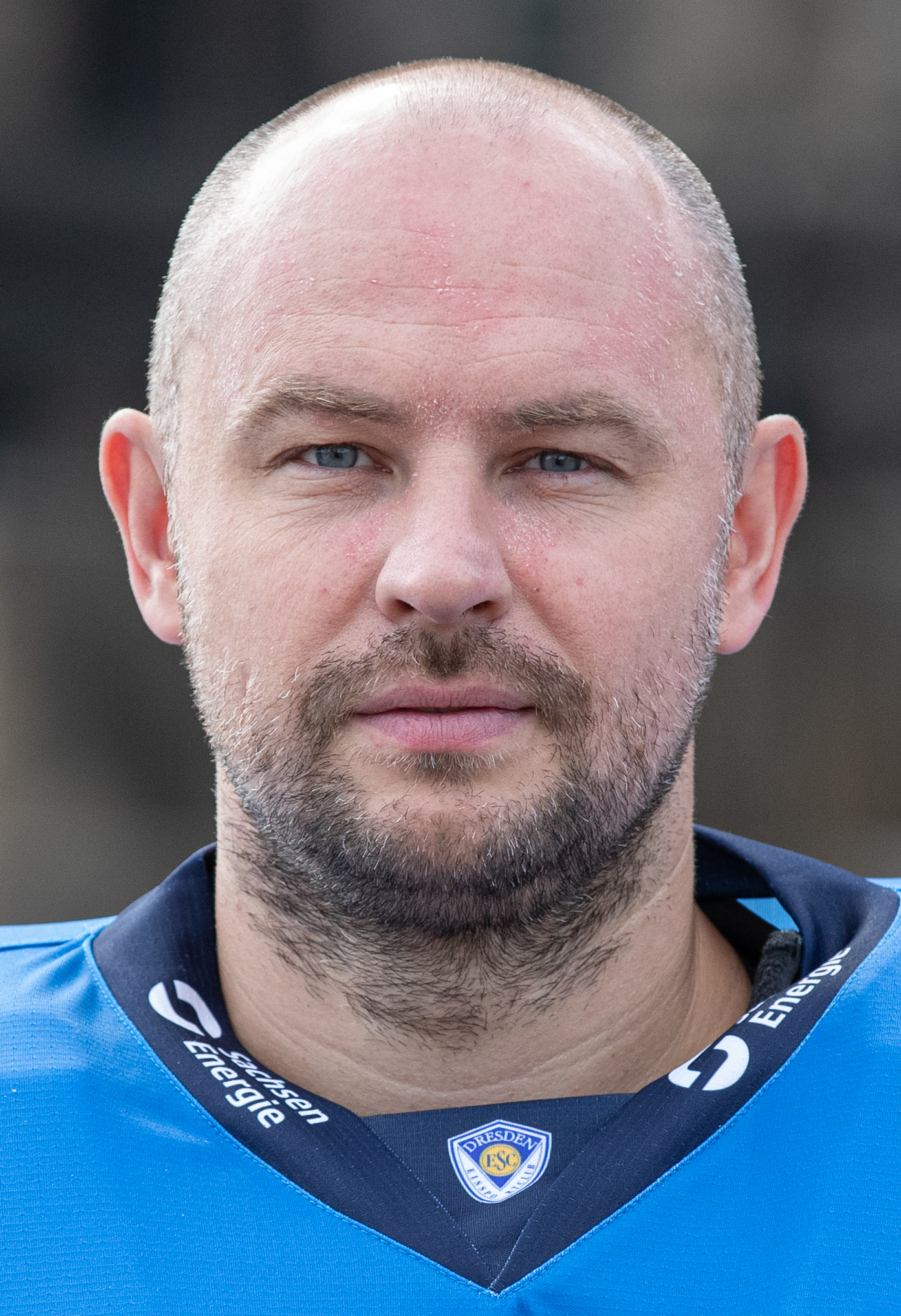
- Július Hudáček in 2025
- Born: 9 August 1988 (age 38) Spišská Nová Ves, Czechoslovakia
- Height: 6 ft 0 in (183 cm)
- Weight: 196 lb (89 kg; 14 st 0 lb)
- Position: Goaltender
- Catches: Right
- Slovak Extraliga team Former teams: HK Poprad; Löwen Frankfurt; HC Košice; Frölunda HC; HC Sibir Novosibirsk; HC Pardubice; Örebro HK; Severstal Cherepovets; Spartak Moscow; Dinamo Riga; HC Sparta Praha; Barys Astana; Kölner Haie; Fischtown Penguins
- National team: Slovakia
- Playing career: 2003–present

Medal record

Men's ice hockey

Representing Slovakia

World Championships
Silver medal – second place	2012 Finland/Sweden	

Július Hudáček (born 9 August 1988) is a Slovak professional ice hockey player who is a goaltender for HK Poprad of the Slovak Extraliga.

== Playing career ==
Hudáček spent several seasons in the Slovak Extraliga, first tending net for HK Spišská Nová Ves in 2003–04, then briefly with Poprad for the 2004–05 season, before returning again to HK Spišská Nová Ves. From 2008-2011, he played primarily with HC Košice, spending some time with HK 2016 Trebišov and HC 46 Bardejov.

From 2011-2013, he played in Sweden, primarily for Frölunda HC.

After a brief stint with HC Sibir Novosibirsk of the Kontinental Hockey League and then with HC CSOB Pardubice of the Czech Extraliga in 2013-14, he returned to Sweden to play for Örebro HK where he played until 2017. At Örebro, he was well-known for post-game on-ice comedic and acrobatic performances after team wins, known as "Hudashows".

After three seasons in Sweden, Hudáček opted for a return to the KHL for the 2017–18 season in securing a one-year deal with Russian club, Severstal Cherepovets, on April 27, 2017. Establishing himself as Severstal's starting goaltender, Hudáček appeared in 48 games with a 2.24 goals against average and .920 save percentage. He was selected to take part in the 2018 KHL All-Star Game and earned goaltender of the week honours for the week of March 2, 2018.

As a free agent, Hudáček opted to continue his KHL career by signing a one-year contract with his third Russian club, HC Spartak Moscow, on May 4, 2018.

== Awards and honors ==
Award	Year
Slovak
Champion	2009, 2010, 2011
