= Oliver Pötzsch =

German author of popular fiction

Oliver Pötzsch (born 20 December 1970) is a German author of popular fiction. He was among the first writers to achieve bestselling status by publishing e-books. His works include The Hangman's Daughter (German: Die Henkerstochter), the first book in the series of the same name.

== Early life ==
Pötzsch was born in Munich. His mother was an elementary school teacher. He is a descendant from a long line of hangmen.

== Bibliography ==
=== The Hangman's Daughter series ===
- The Hangman's Daughter (2008, German: Die Henkerstochter)
- The Dark Monk (2009, German: Die Henkerstochter und der schwarze Mönch)
- The Beggar King (2010, German: Die Henkerstochter und der König der Bettler)
- The Poisoned Pilgrim (2012, German: Der Hexer und die Henkerstochter)
- The Werewolf of Bamberg (2014, German: Die Henkerstochter und der Teufel von Bamberg)
- The Play of Death (2016, German: Die Henkerstochter und das Spiel des Todes)
- The Council of Twelve (2018, German: Der Rat der Zwölf)

=== A Leopold von Herzfeldt Case series ===
- The Gravedigger's Almanac (2025)

=== Other works ===
- Die Ludwig-Verschwörung (2011)
- Die Burg der Könige (2013)
- Ritter Kuno Kettenstrumpf (2014)
- Ritter Kuno Kettenstrumpf und die geheimnisvolle Flaschenpost (2015)
- Die Schwarzen Musketiere − Das Buch der Nacht (2015)
- Die Schwarzen Musketiere − Das Schwert der Macht (2016)
- Der Spielmann: Die Geschichte des Johann Georg Faustus (2018)
- Das Buch des Totengräbers (2023)

== Personal life ==
Pötzsch is married to Katrin, with whom he has two children.
