= German Development League =

The German Development League (German: Deutsche Nachwuchsliga, DNL) is the elite junior league of the German Ice Hockey Federation. It was founded in 2000 in cooperation with the national hockey associations. Its objective is to educate and care for young German ice hockey players, as well as to serve as an introduction into the German professional leagues of the sport, including the Deutsche Eishockey Liga (DEL).

There are presently 15 DNL teams and 16 DNL2 teams. Until 2010, the DNL included players up to the age of 17 (U18). For the 2010/11 season, the age groups were frozen for the first time, and U19 teams then played in the DNL. After the age groups were frozen again for the 2018/19 season, U20 teams have been taking part since then. Since 2018, the U20 and U17 teams have played in three or two divisions.

== Teams ==
DNL Team	Championships
Augsburger EV	
Düsseldorfer EG	
EC Bad Tölz	
Eisbären Juniors Berlin	
ESV Kaufbeuren	
EV Landshut	2011
EV Regensburg	
ESC Dresden	
Jungadler Mannheim	2009, 2010, 2012, 2013, 2014, 2015
Kölner EC Die Haie	
Krefelder EV 81	
Starbulls Rosenheim	
