= 2018–19 DEL season =

- League: Deutsche Eishockey Liga
- Sport: Ice hockey
- Duration: 14 September 2018 – 30 April 2019
- Games: 364
- Teams: 14

Regular season
- Season champions: Adler Mannheim
- Season MVP: Danny aus den Birken
- Top scorer: Jeremy Williams (57 points)

Finals
- Champions: Adler Mannheim
- Runners-up: EHC Red Bull München
- Finals MVP: Dennis Endras

DEL seasons
- ← 2017–18 2019–20 →

The 2018–19 Deutsche Eishockey Liga season was the 25th season since the founding of the Deutsche Eishockey Liga running from 14 September 2018 to 30 April 2019.

All 14 clubs from the previous year and the Löwen Frankfurt applied for a license. The season saw the same teams as last year, as all teams were given their license.

After a points-per-game record during the regular season with 2,23 points per game, the Adler Mannheim won the title for their seventh time defeating EHC Red Bull München 4–1 in the finals.

== Player and staff awards ==
During the season, Danny aus den Birken, goalkeeper of EHC Red Bull München was selected as both DEL Player of the Year and Goalie of the Year. Philipp Gogulla from Düsseldorfer EG was awarded as forward of the year whereas Joonas Lehtivouri from the Adler Mannheim was elected as defenceman of the year. For the award of Rookie of the Year, the later NHL first round pick Moritz Seider was chosen by the DEL-fans. The lineup is completed by Don Jackson (RB München) as coach of the year. After the playoffs, Adler Mannheim's goalkeeper Dennis Endras was awarded with the MVP of the playoffs-title.

== Teams ==
Teams of the 2018–19 DEL season

Team	City	Arena	Capacity
Augsburger Panther	Augsburg	Curt Frenzel Stadium	6,218
Eisbären Berlin	Berlin	Mercedes-Benz Arena	14,200
Fischtown Pinguins	Bremerhaven	Eisarena Bremerhaven	4,674
Düsseldorfer EG	Düsseldorf	ISS Dome	13,400
ERC Ingolstadt	Ingolstadt	Saturn Arena	4,815
Iserlohn Roosters	Iserlohn	Eissporthalle Iserlohn	5,000
Kölner Haie	Cologne	Lanxess Arena	18,500
Krefeld Pinguine	Krefeld	König Palast	9,000
Adler Mannheim	Mannheim	SAP Arena	13,600
EHC Red Bull München	Munich	Olympia Eishalle	6,256
Thomas Sabo Ice Tigers	Nuremberg	Arena Nürnberger Versicherung	7,810
Schwenninger Wild Wings	Villingen-Schwenningen	Helios Arena	6,215
Straubing Tigers	Straubing	Eisstadion am Pulverturm	6,000
Grizzlys Wolfsburg	Wolfsburg	Eis Arena Wolfsburg	4,660

== Regular season ==
=== Standings ===
Pos	Team	Pld	W	OTW	OTL	L	GF	GA	GD	Pts	Qualification
1	Adler Mannheim	52	35	2	7	8	194	117	+77	116	Playoffs
2	EHC Red Bull München	52	31	5	6	10	176	118	+58	109	Playoffs
3	Augsburger Panther	52	24	4	6	18	149	139	+10	86	Playoffs
4	Kölner Haie	52	23	6	5	18	147	139	+8	86	Playoffs
5	ERC Ingolstadt	52	23	7	3	19	158	152	+6	86	Playoffs
6	Düsseldorfer EG	52	18	9	11	14	151	136	+15	83	Playoffs
7	Fischtown Pinguins	52	21	6	6	19	169	161	+8	81	Pre-playoffs
8	Straubing Tigers	52	21	6	6	19	159	151	+8	81	Pre-playoffs
9	Eisbären Berlin	52	20	6	2	24	146	164	−18	74	Pre-playoffs
10	Thomas Sabo Ice Tigers	52	18	4	3	27	158	168	−10	65	Pre-playoffs
11	Krefeld Pinguine	52	12	11	3	26	141	170	−29	61	
12	Grizzlys Wolfsburg	52	15	2	10	25	134	182	−48	59	
13	Iserlohn Roosters	52	15	2	7	28	162	189	−27	56	
14	Schwenninger Wild Wings	52	10	8	3	31	111	169	−58	49	

Source: DEL
Rules for classification: 1) points; 2) head-to-head points; 3) head-to-head goal difference; 4) head-to-head number of goals scored.

=== Results ===
==== Matches 1–26 ====
Home \ Away	AUG	BER	BRE	DÜS	ING	ISE	KÖL	KRE	MAN	MUN	NÜR	SCH	STR	WOL
Augsburger Panther	—	1–2 (OT)	4–1	1–2 (OT)	6–3	4–2	4–1	3–2	1–5	0–2	5–2	8–1	2–5	6–0
Eisbären Berlin	1–2	—	5–2	3–2 (SO)	1–3	4–3	0–4	5–3	4–1	2–4	5–4	5–3	0–1 (SO)	3–2 (OT)
Fischtown Pinguins	4–0	2–3	—	3–4	4–5	4–1	2–6	5–3	2–1 (OT)	6–2	2–1	3–0	3–1	4–3
Düsseldorfer EG	5–3	5–1	2–3 (SO)	—	2–3 (OT)	5–1	4–3	3–4 (OT)	2–3	3–1	4–3 (OT)	4–0	1–3	7–3
ERC Ingolstadt	1–3	2–4	3–0	3–2 (OT)	—	3–4 (OT)	6–0	7–4	4–3 (OT)	0–4	4–1	6–0	1–4	2–1 (OT)
Iserlohn Roosters	6–7	3–2	4–2	6–3	4–2	—	1–3	2–3 (OT)	2–3	8–3	6–3	5–2	2–4	5–2
Kölner Haie	4–5 (OT)	3–2	3–2 (SO)	2–3 (OT)	1–2	2–1 (OT)	—	2–3	2–4	3–4 (SO)	4–1	3–1	0–1	2–0
Krefeld Pinguine	3–2	1–3	3–4 (OT)	3–2 (OT)	4–7	6–5 (OT)	4–5	—	0–2	2–5	2–0	4–2	2–3 (OT)	4–3
Adler Mannheim	4–0	2–3	4–1	1–2 (OT)	3–1	6–2	5–3	3–0	—	4–5 (SO)	4–2	3–1	6–1	6–3
EHC Red Bull München	2–1	3–1	2–3 (OT)	5–4 (OT)	2–4	6–2	2–1 (OT)	1–2	0–1 (SO)	—	4–1	4–2	3–1	5–1
Thomas Sabo Ice Tigers	0–1	4–3	6–2	2–3	3–4	7–1	2–3	3–4	1–4	1–4	—	0–2	5–2	5–1
Schwenninger Wild Wings	0–3	0–1 (SO)	2–3	0–3	3–4	5–3	1–4	4–5 (OT)	4–0	4–3 (OT)	3–2 (OT)	—	2–5	3–2 (SO)
Straubing Tigers	2–4	5–3	1–2	2–3 (OT)	4–2	2–1	3–1	2–3 (SO)	5–6	1–3	3–7	2–1	—	1–2
Grizzlys Wolfsburg	4–2	4–2	3–6	4–3	4–3	1–3	3–5	2–3 (SO)	4–3 (OT)	0–4	2–3 (OT)	3–0	2–5	—

Source: DEL
Legend: Blue = home team win; Yellow = draw; Red = away team win.

==== Matches 27–52 ====
Home \ Away	AUG	BER	BRE	DÜS	ING	ISE	KÖL	KRE	MAN	MUN	NÜR	SCH	STR	WOL
Augsburger Panther	—	3–0	3–2 (SO)	3–6	4–2	3–2 (SO)	2–1	4–0	2–6	3–2	2–3 (SO)	3–1	3–2 (OT)	6–2
Eisbären Berlin	0–1	—	5–3	2–0	2–4	4–3 (SO)	5–4	6–3	0–7	2–6	2–5	1–3	4–0	1–4
Fischtown Pinguins	5–0	4–5	—	4–3	6–5 (OT)	2–3	2–3	5–2	4–5 (OT)	4–3 (OT)	4–2	3–4 (OT)	1–3	8–1
Düsseldorfer EG	4–3	4–5 (OT)	5–4 (SO)	—	3–2 (SO)	3–2	3–4 (SO)	1–2	1–2	2–5	1–3	3–4 (OT)	2–3 (OT)	3–1
ERC Ingolstadt	3–2 (OT)	2–3	2–4	1–0	—	3–2	3–2	4–0	1–6	2–4	3–0	4–1	6–4	3–2 (OT)
Iserlohn Roosters	2–4	2–5	3–5	4–2	1–2	—	3–4 (SO)	5–2	1–2	3–5	8–2	5–4	3–4	7–6 (OT)
Kölner Haie	6–1	2–5	5–4 (OT)	2–3 (OT)	5–2	2–1	—	3–0	1–5	1–6	6–3	3–1	2–1	0–3
Krefeld Pinguine	5–4 (OT)	6–2	2–3	2–4	2–3 (SO)	4–1	1–3	—	5–4	3–2 (OT)	2–4	3–5	0–1	5–2
Adler Mannheim	5–3	6–2	6–5	2–5	7–2	4–3	2–3 (SO)	4–2	—	1–2	4–3	1–2	6–3	5–1
EHC Red Bull München	4–1	4–3 (OT)	1–4	4–1	3–2	5–1	5–2	2–0	1–3	—	7–2	1–2 (SO)	4–3	3–1
Thomas Sabo Ice Tigers	5–3	6–4	7–3	3–2	1–2	5–2	1–2	4–3	1–4	4–1	—	4–3 (SO)	2–3 (OT)	0–7
Schwenninger Wild Wings	3–6	3–5	2–5	0–1	5–1	4–3	2–3	2–1	0–4	5–3	3–8	—	2–1 (OT)	0–3
Straubing Tigers	2–1 (OT)	7–3	5–0	2–3	7–2	4–5	7–4	3–4 (OT)	4–3 (SO)	5–6	6–5 (SO)	5–2	—	5–4
Grizzlys Wolfsburg	2–1	3–2	4–0	2–3 (SO)	5–7	5–4 (OT)	2–4	4–5 (OT)	5–3	0–4	0–5	1–2 (SO)	6–1	—

Source: DEL
Legend: Blue = home team win; Yellow = draw; Red = away team win.

== Playoffs ==
The playoffs started on 6 March 2019.

=== Bracket ===
First round
7	Fischtown Pinguins	1
10	Thomas Sabo Ice Tigers	2
8	Straubing Tigers	0
9	Eisbären Berlin	2

Quarterfinals
1	Adler Mannheim	4
10	Thomas Sabo Ice Tigers	1
2	EHC Red Bull München	4
9	Eisbären Berlin	2
3	Augsburger Panther	4
6	Düsseldorfer EG	3
4	Kölner Haie	4
5	ERC Ingolstadt	3

Semifinals
1	Adler Mannheim	4
4	Kölner Haie	0
(Pairings are re-seeded after the first and second round)
2	EHC Red Bull München	4
3	Augsburger Panther	3

Finals
1	Adler Mannheim	4
2	EHC Red Bull München	1

=== Pre-playoffs ===
The playoff qualification were played between 6 and 10 March 2019 in a best-of-three mode.

==== Fischtown Pinguins vs. Thomas Sabo Ice Tigers ====
6 March	Fischtown Pinguins	1–3	Thomas Sabo Ice Tigers	Eisarena Bremerhaven, Bremerhaven	Recap
No scoring		First period	04:11 – Chris Brown; 13:37 – Patrick Reimer (PP2)
Chad Nehring – 35:05		Second period	27:18 – Tim Bender
No scoring		Third period	No scoring
Tomáš Pöpperle (24 saves / 27 shots)		Goalie stats	Niklas Treutle (28 saves / 29 shots)

8 March	Thomas Sabo Ice Tigers	3–4	2OT	Fischtown Pinguins	Arena Nürnberger Versicherung, Nuremberg	Recap
Leonhard Pföderl (PP2) – 08:32; Chris Brown (PP) – 09:12		First period		No scoring
No scoring		Second period		No scoring
Brandon Segal – 43:05		Third period		44:15 – Brock Hooton; 44:31 – Justin Feser; 51:23 – William Weber
No scoring		Second overtime period		99:14 – Maxime Fortunus
Niklas Treutle (52 saves / 56 shots)		Goalie stats		Tomáš Pöpperle (35 saves / 38 shots)

10 March	Fischtown Pinguins	2–3	OT	Thomas Sabo Ice Tigers	Eisarena Bremerhaven, Bremerhaven	Recap
Chad Nehring – 09:04		First period		No scoring
No scoring		Second period		47:59 – Shawn Lalonde (PP)
Alex Friesen (EA) – 59:31		Third period		49:07 – Tom Gilbert
No scoring		First overtime period		63:36 – Dane Fox
Tomáš Pöpperle (19 saves / 22 shots)		Goalie stats		Niklas Treutle (32 saves / 34 shots)

Nürnberg won series 2–1

==== Straubing Tigers vs. Eisbären Berlin ====
6 March	Straubing Tigers	2–3	Eisbären Berlin	Eisstadion am Pulverturm, Straubing	Recap
No scoring		First period	No scoring
Vladislav Filin – 23:25		Second period	29:08 – Martin Buchwieser
Antoine Laganière – 46:23		Third period	40:42 – Austin Ortega
No scoring		overtime period	70:31 – Ortega
Jeff Zatkoff (41 saves / 44 shots)		Goalie stats	Kevin Poulin (37 saves / 39 shots)

8 March	Eisbären Berlin	4–2	Straubing Tigers	Mercedes-Benz Arena, Berlin	Recap
Marcel Noebels – 01:35; Jamie MacQueen – 17:45		First period	No scoring
André Rankel – 30:36		Second period	24:52 – Sandro Schönberger
James Sheppard – 50:21		Third period	53:36 – Stephan Daschner
Kevin Poulin (39 saves / 41 shots)		Goalie stats	Jeff Zatkoff (35 saves / 39 shots)

Berlin won series 2–0

=== Quarterfinals ===
The quarterfinals were played between 12 and 31 March 2019 in a best-of-seven mode.

==== Adler Mannheim vs. Thomas Sabo Ice Tigers ====
13 March	Adler Mannheim	7–2	Thomas Sabo Ice Tigers	SAP Arena, Mannheim	Recap
Andrew Desjardins (PP) – 11:27		First period	15:42 – Patrick Reimer (PP)
Markus Eisenschmid – 22:38; Andrew Desjardins – 23:57; Markus Eisenschmid – 24:37		Second period	38:19 – Leonhard Pföderl
Luke Adam – 45:19; Tommi Huhtala – 53:50; Andrew Desjardins – 59:28		Third period	No scoring
Dennis Endras (17 saves / 19 shots)		Goalie stats	Niklas Treutle (35 saves / 42 shots)

15 March	Thomas Sabo Ice Tigers	2–4	Adler Mannheim	Arena Nürnberger Versicherung, Nuremberg	Recap
No scoring		First period	06:34 – Luke Adam; 18:28 – Markus Eisenschmid (PP)
Daniel Weiss – 36:46		Second period	21:50 – Markus Eisenschmid; 38:05 – Tommi Huhtala
Shawn Lalonde – 48:02		Third period	No scoring
Niklas Treutle (33 saves / 37 shots)		Goalie stats	Dennis Endras (25 saves / 27 shots)

17 March	Adler Mannheim	4–1	Thomas Sabo Ice Tigers	SAP Arena, Mannheim	Recap
Markus Eisenschmid (PP) – 12:43		First period	05:54 – Chris Brown (PP)
Mark Katic – 23:56; Ben Smith – 35:59		Second period	No scoring
Luke Adam – 51:54		Third period	No scoring
Dennis Endras (23 saves / 24 shots)		Goalie stats	Andreas Jenike (39 saves / 43 shots)

22 March	Thomas Sabo Ice Tigers	4–3	OT	Adler Mannheim	Arena Nürnberger Versicherung, Nuremberg	Recap
No scoring		First period		No scoring
Brandon Segal – 31:57		Second period		27:45 – Matthias Plachta (PP); 34:49 – Mark Katic (PP)
Daniel Weiss (PP) – 53:03; Patrick Reimer – 56:27		Third period		59:32 – Andrew Desjardins (EA)
Patrick Reimer – 65:09		First overtime period		No scoring
Niklas Treutle (41 saves / 44 shots)		Goalie stats		Dennis Endras (23 saves / 27 shots)

24 March	Adler Mannheim	7–4	Thomas Sabo Ice Tigers	SAP Arena, Mannheim	Recap
Garrett Festerling (PP2) – 11:53; Ben Smith (PP) – 19:12		First period	12:51 – Chad Bassen (PP); 19:52 – Patrick Reimer (PP)
Chad Kolarik – 29:36; Markus Eisenschmid – 38:34		Second period	29:14 – Patrick Reimer
David Wolf (PP) – 42:05; Denis Reul (EA) – 45:08; Mark Katic (EN) – 58:06		Third period	50:31 – Eric Stephan
Dennis Endras (17 saves / 21 shots)		Goalie stats	Niklas Treutle (32 saves / 39 shots)

Mannheim won series 4–1

==== EHC Red Bull München vs. Eisbären Berlin ====
13 March	EHC Red Bull München	3–2	OT	Eisbären Berlin	Olympia Eishalle, Munich	Recap
No scoring		First period		No scoring
No scoring		Second period		No scoring
Frank Mauer – 45:36; Justin Shugg – 54:26		Third period		44:53 – Sean Backman; 47:05 – Brendan Ranford
Justin Shugg (PP) – 70:08		First overtime period		No scoring
Danny aus den Birken (28 saves / 30 shots)		Goalie stats		Kevin Poulin (46 saves / 49 shots)

15 March	Eisbären Berlin	4–0	EHC Red Bull München	Mercedes-Benz Arena, Berlin	Recap
Sean Backman (PP) – 08:11; Austin Ortega – 16:11		First period	No scoring
Brendan Ranford (PP) – 25:04; Sean Backman – 26:20		Second period	No scoring
No scoring		Third period	No scoring
Kevin Poulin (40 saves / 40 shots)		Goalie stats	Danny aus den Birken (23 saves / 27 shots)

17 March	EHC Red Bull München	4–1	Eisbären Berlin	Olympia Eishalle, Munich	Recap
Keith Aulie – 05:09		First period	No scoring
Yasin Ehliz (SH) – 23:09; Patrick Hager (PP) – 30:52		Second period	33:38 – Sean Backman (PP)
Frank Mauer – 49:23		Third period	No scoring
Danny aus den Birken (24 saves / 25 shots)		Goalie stats	Kevin Poulin (29 saves / 33 shots)

22 March	Eisbären Berlin	2–5	EHC Red Bull München	Mercedes-Benz Arena, Berlin	Recap
No scoring		First period	00:28 – Justin Shugg; 17:39 – Daryl Boyle
No scoring		Second period	33:37 – Frank Mauer; 39:43 – Derek Joslin
James Sheppard – 51:17; André Rankel – 58:36		Third period	49:10 – Yasin Ehliz
Kevin Poulin (24 saves / 29 shots)		Goalie stats	Danny aus den Birken (32 saves / 34 shots)

24 March	EHC Red Bull München	0–3	Eisbären Berlin	Olympia Eishalle, Munich	Recap
No scoring		First period	11:35 – Jamie MacQueen (PP)
No scoring		Second period	No scoring
No scoring		Third period	48:16 – Austin Ortega; 48:53 – Austin Ortega
Danny aus den Birken (22 saves / 25 shots)		Goalie stats	Kevin Poulin (29 saves / 29 shots)

29 March	Eisbären Berlin	3–4	EHC Red Bull München	Mercedes-Benz Arena, Berlin	Recap
James Sheppard (PP) – 08:33		First period	05:27 – Maximilian Kastner; 13:25 – Mads Christensen; 16:53 – Michael Wolf (PP2); 17:40 – Justin Shugg (PP)
Marcel Noebels – 29:19; Jamie MacQueen (PP) – 33:46		Second period	No scoring
No scoring		Third period	No scoring
Kevin Poulin (24 saves / 28 shots)		Goalie stats	Danny aus den Birken (22 saves / 25 shots)

Munich won series 4–2

==== Augsburger Panther vs. Düsseldorfer EG ====
12 March	Augsburger Panther	7–1	Düsseldorfer EG	Curt Frenzel Stadium, Augsburg	Recap
Matthew White – 10:47		First period	No scoring
Patrick McNeill – 25:38 (PP); Daniel Schmölz – 32:08		Second period	No scoring
Matthew White – 44:23; Simon Sezemsky – 49:05; Scott Valentine – 52:35; Simon Sezemsky – 55:59		Third period	53:29 – Alexander Barta
Olivier Roy (22 saves / 23 shots)		Goalie stats	Mathias Niederberger (29 saves / 36 shots)

15 March	Düsseldorfer EG	4–1	Augsburger Panther	ISS Dome, Düsseldorf	Recap
Jaedon Descheneau – 07:52; Manuel Strodel – 12:18		First period	No scoring
No scoring		Second period	No scoring
Jaedon Descheneau (EA) – 47:09; John Henrion (EN) – 59:37		Third period	48:56 – Braden Lamb (PP2)
Mathias Niederberger (19 saves / 20 shots)		Goalie stats	Olivier Roy (29 saves / 33 shots)

17 March	Augsburger Panther	3–4	Düsseldorfer EG	Curt Frenzel Stadium, Augsburg	Recap
Simon Sezemsky (PP) – 01:00		First period	01:35 – Jaedon Descheneau; 12:37 – Patrick Buzas; 18:10 – Braden Pimm (PP)
Matthew White – 27:38; Drew LeBlanc (SH) – 30:54		Second period	37:18 – Philip Gogulla
No scoring		Third period	No scoring
Olivier Roy (16 saves / 20 shots)		Goalie stats	Mathias Niederberger (33 saves / 36 shots)

22 March	Düsseldorfer EG	1–2	Augsburger Panther	ISS Dome, Düsseldorf	Recap
No scoring		First period	No scoring
Ryan McKiernan (PP) – 35:04		Second period	21:50 – Patrick McNeill; 22:49 – David Stieler
No scoring		Third period	No scoring
Mathias Niederberger (16 saves / 18 shots)		Goalie stats	Olivier Roy (21 saves / 22 shots)

24 March	Augsburger Panther	4–3	OT	Düsseldorfer EG	Curt Frenzel Stadium, Augsburg	Recap
No scoring		First period		18:39 – Ryan McKiernan
Matt Fraser (PP) – 21:08		Second period		35:53 – Marco Nowak (PP); 36:45 – Alexander Barta
Jaroslav Hafenrichter – 42:47; David Stieler (EA) – 59:14		Third period		No scoring
Thomas Holzmann – 61:32		First overtime period		No scoring
Olivier Roy (23 saves / 26 shots)		Goalie stats		Mathias Niederberger (25 saves / 29 shots)

29 March	Düsseldorfer EG	4–3	OT	Augsburger Panther	ISS Dome, Düsseldorf	Recap
No scoring		First period		05:03 – Matt Fraser (PP); 06:06 – Drew LeBlanc (SH)
Jaedon Descheneau – 31:32		Second period		35:33 – Braden Lamb (PP)
Alexander Barta – 49:53; Kevin Marshall (EA) – 59:08		Third period		No scoring
Jaedon Descheneau – 60:36		First overtime period		No scoring
Mathias Niederberger (16 saves / 19 shots)		Goalie stats		Olivier Roy (28 saves / 32 shots)

31 March	Augsburger Panther	2–1	Düsseldorfer EG	Curt Frenzel Stadium, Augsburg	Recap
Daniel Schmölz – 18:46		First period	13:52 – Braden Pimm (PP)
No scoring		Second period	No scoring
Andrew LeBlanc – 43:20		Third period	No scoring
Olivier Roy (17 saves / 18 shots)		Goalie stats	Mathias Niederberger (31 saves / 33 shots)

Augsburg won series 4–3

==== Kölner Haie vs. ERC Ingolstadt ====
12 March	Kölner Haie	2–6	ERC Ingolstadt	Lanxess Arena, Cologne	Recap
No scoring		First period	12:34 – Brandon Mashinter (PP); 16:25 – David Elsner
Jason Akeson – 29:14; Jason Akeson (PP) – 30:17		Second period	23:29 – Joachim Ramoser
No scoring		Third period	42:55 – Thomas Greilinger (PP); 46:58 – Ryan Garbutt; 51:00 – Jerry D'Amigo
Gustaf Wesslau (27 saves / 33 shots)		Goalie stats	Jochen Reimer (27 saves / 29 shots)

15 March	ERC Ingolstadt	4–3	OT	Kölner Haie	Saturn Arena, Ingolstadt	Recap
David Elsner – 17:53		First period		13:40 – Simon Després (PP)
Brandon Mashinter (PP) – 29:46		Second period		20:18 – Frederik Tiffels
Maury Edwards – 47:35		Third period		58:52 – Austin Madaisky (EA)
Thomas Greilinger – 67:12		First overtime period		No scoring
Jochen Reimer (34 saves / 37 shots)		Goalie stats		Gustaf Wesslau (30 saves / 34 shots)

17 March	Kölner Haie	3–2	OT	ERC Ingolstadt	Lanxess Arena, Cologne	Recap
No scoring		First period		No scoring
Sebastian Uvira – 30:37; Rok Tičar – 36:02		Second period		29:23 – David Elsner
No scoring		Third period		43:07 – Jerry D'Amigo (PP)
Ryan Jones – 62:56		First overtime period		No scoring
Gustaf Wesslau (23 saves / 25 shots)		Goalie stats		Jochen Reimer (26 saves / 29 shots)

22 March	ERC Ingolstadt	3–2	OT	Kölner Haie	Saturn Arena, Ingolstadt	Recap
Tim Wohlgemuth – 03:00		First period		No scoring
Brett Olson (PP) – 34:29		Second period		32:39 – Colby Genoway (PP)
No scoring		Third period		54:11 – Alexander Oblinger
Brandon Mashinter – 63:26		First overtime period		No scoring
Jochen Reimer (51 saves / 53 shots)		Goalie stats		Gustaf Wesslau (25 saves / 28 shots)

24 March	Kölner Haie	4–2	ERC Ingolstadt	Lanxess Arena, Cologne	Recap
Fabio Pfohl – 17:20		First period	03:34 – Darin Olver
Mike Zalewski – 22:40		Second period	23:27 – Tim Wohlgemuth
Frederik Tiffels – 44:49; Jason Akeson (EN) – 59:24		Third period	No scoring
Gustaf Wesslau (18 saves / 20 shots)		Goalie stats	Jochen Reimer (24 saves / 28 shots)

29 March	ERC Ingolstadt	2–5	Kölner Haie	Saturn Arena, Ingolstadt	Recap
No scoring		First period	04:15 – Alexander Oblinger; 11:00 – Felix Schütz (PP); 13:01 – Felix Schütz (PP)
Benedikt Kohl – 26:38; Brett Olson (PP) – 33:07		Second period	No scoring
No scoring		Third period	54:01 – Felix Schütz; 58:23 – Jason Akeson (EN)
Jochen Reimer (22 saves / 27 shots)		Goalie stats	Gustaf Wesslau (34 saves / 36 shots)

31 March	Kölner Haie	3–2	ERC Ingolstadt	Lanxess Arena, Cologne	Recap
Ryan Jones – 03:59		First period	No scoring
Ryan Jones (PP) – 37:22		Second period	25:49– Brandon Mashinter (PP)
Frederik Tiffels – 55:57		Third period	58:59 – Mike Collins (EA)
Gustaf Wesslau (25 saves / 27 shots)		Goalie stats	Timo Pielmeier (20 saves / 23 shots)

Köln won series 4–3

=== Semifinals ===
The semifinals were played between 2 and 16 April 2019 in a best-of-seven mode.

==== Adler Mannheim vs. Kölner Haie ====
2 April	Adler Mannheim	1–0	Kölner Haie	SAP Arena, Mannheim	Recap
Ben Smith – 32:08		First period	No scoring
No scoring		Second period	No scoring
No scoring		Third period	No scoring
Dennis Endras (20 saves / 20 shots)		Goalie stats	Hannibal Weitzmann (21 saves / 22 shots)

5 April	Kölner Haie	1–4	Adler Mannheim	Lanxess Arena, Cologne	Recap
No scoring		First period	08:28 – Markus Eisenschmid (PP)
No scoring		Second period	22:37 – Chad Kolarik; 34:55 – Andrew Desjardins (PP)
Ben Hanowski – 45:21		Third period	55:23 – David Wolf
Hannibal Weitzmann (23 saves / 27 shots)		Goalie stats	Dennis Endras (19 saves / 20 shots)

7 April	Adler Mannheim	4–0	Kölner Haie	SAP Arena, Mannheim	Recap
No scoring		First period	No scoring
Mark Katic – 28:37		Second period	No scoring
Matthias Plachta (PP) – 41:23; Andrew Desjardins – 50:17; Luke Adam – 53:14		Third period	No scoring
Dennis Endras (16 saves / 16 shots)		Goalie stats	Gustaf Wesslau (22 saves / 26 shots)

9 April	Kölner Haie	2–4	Adler Mannheim	Lanxess Arena, Cologne	Recap
No scoring		First period	10:46 – Luke Adam
No scoring		Second period	27:25 – Andrew Desjardins (PP); 27:59 – Garrett Festerling (PP); 31:25 – Ben Smith
Pascal Zerressen – 44:43; Frederik Tiffels (PP) – 53:24		Third period	No scoring
Gustaf Wesslau (17 saves / 21 shots)		Goalie stats	Dennis Endras (19 saves / 21 shots)

Mannheim won series 4–0

==== EHC Red Bull München vs. Augsburger Panther ====
3 April	EHC Red Bull München	2–1	3OT	Augsburger Panther	Olympia Eishalle, Munich	Recap
No scoring		First period		No scoring
No scoring		Second period		No scoring
Mark Voakes (PP) – 53:58		Third period		54:52 – Braden Lamb (PP)
Mark Voakes – 101:12		Third overtime period		No scoring
Danny aus den Birken (36 saves / 37 shots)		Goalie stats		Olivier Roy (51 saves / 53 shots)

5 April	Augsburger Panther	4–3	EHC Red Bull München	Curt Frenzel Stadium, Augsburg	Recap
Matt Fraser – 16:22		First period	17:21 – Mark Voakes
Matthew White – 25:01		Second period	21:41 – John Mitchell
Andrew LeBlanc – 41:45; Andrew LeBlanc (PP) – 59:34		Third period	47:33 – John Mitchell
Olivier Roy (38 saves / 41 shots)		Goalie stats	Danny aus den Birken (25 saves / 29 shots)

7 April	EHC Red Bull München	1–2	3OT	Augsburger Panther	Olympia Eishalle, Munich	Recap
No scoring		First period		09:42 – James Arniel
John Mitchell (PP) – 32:24		Second period		No scoring
No scoring		Third period		No scoring
No scoring		Third overtime period		103:34 – Braden Lamb
Danny aus den Birken (48 saves / 50 shots)		Goalie stats		Olivier Roy (70 saves / 71 shots)

10 April	Augsburger Panther	1–2	EHC Red Bull München	Curt Frenzel Stadium, Augsburg	Recap
No scoring		First period	02:03 – Derek Joslin (PP)
No scoring		Second period	No scoring
David Stieler – 45:47		Third period	44:05 – Derek Joslin
Olivier Roy (25 saves / 27 shots)		Goalie stats	Danny aus den Birken (23 saves / 24 shots)

12 April	EHC Red Bull München	1–0	Augsburger Panther	Olympia Eishalle, Munich	Recap
No scoring		First period	No scoring
Trevor Parkes (PP) – 34:09		Second period	No scoring
No scoring		Third period	No scoring
Danny aus den Birken (20 saves / 20 shots)		Goalie stats	Olivier Roy (31 saves / 32 shots)

14 April	Augsburger Panther	2–0	EHC Red Bull München	Curt Frenzel Stadium, Augsburg	Recap
No scoring		First period	No scoring
Adam Payerl (PP) – 39:56		Second period	No scoring
Adam Payerl (EN) – 59:54		Third period	No scoring
Olivier Roy (33 saves / 33 shots)		Goalie stats	Danny aus den Birken (28 saves / 30 shots)

16 April	EHC Red Bull München	2–0	Augsburger Panther	Olympia Eishalle, Munich	Recap
Mads Christensen – 15:31		First period	No scoring
Patrick Hager – 25:33		Second period	No scoring
No scoring		Third period	No scoring
Danny aus den Birken (22 saves / 22 shots)		Goalie stats	Olivier Roy (31 saves / 33 shots)

Munich won series 4–3

=== Final ===
The final was played between 18 and 30 April 2019 in a best-of-seven mode.

18 April	Adler Mannheim	1–2	EHC Red Bull München	SAP Arena, Mannheim	Recap
No scoring		First period	No scoring
Ben Smith (PP) – 24:00		Second period	No scoring
No scoring		Third period	47:14 – Matt Stajan (SH)
No scoring		overtime period	78:21 – Frank Mauer
Dennis Endras (26 saves / 28 shots)		Goalie stats	Danny aus den Birken (40 saves / 41 shots)

20 April	EHC Red Bull München	0–3	Adler Mannheim	Olympia Eishalle, Munich	Recap
No scoring		First period	01:21 – Chad Kolarik
No scoring		Second period	No scoring
No scoring		Third period	43:33 – Markus Eisenschmid (PP); 56:11 – Ben Smith (SH, EN)
Danny aus den Birken (16 saves / 19 shots)		Goalie stats	Dennis Endras (23 saves / 23 shots)

22 April	Adler Mannheim	4–1	EHC Red Bull München	SAP Arena, Mannheim	Recap
Matthias Plachta – 00:05; Andrew Desjardins (PP2) – 06:54		First period	No scoring
Andrew Desjardins – 25:24		Second period	30:22 – Patrick Hager (PP)
Tommi Huhtala – 55:32		Third period	No scoring
Dennis Endras (15 saves / 16 shots)		Goalie stats	Danny aus den Birken (21 saves / 25 shots)

24 April	EHC Red Bull München	0–4	Adler Mannheim	Olympia Eishalle, Munich	Recap
No scoring		First period	No scoring
No scoring		Second period	23:52 – Cody Lampl; 24:36 – Ben Smith; 25:58 – Phil Hungerecker
No scoring		Third period	41:32 – Matthias Plachta
Danny aus den Birken (21 saves / 25 shots)		Goalie stats	Dennis Endras (20 saves / 20 shots)

26 April	Adler Mannheim	5–4	OT	EHC Red Bull München	SAP Arena, Mannheim	Recap
Marcel Goc – 05:37; Cody Lampl – 11:48		First period		No scoring
Matthias Plachta – 23:01; Tommi Huhtala – 30:09		Second period		25:17 – Trevor Parkes (PP); 38:27 – Andreas Eder
No scoring		Third period		45:42 – Patrick Hager (PP); 47:29 – Yasin Ehliz
Thomas Larkin – 73:37		First overtime period		No scoring
Dennis Endras (20 saves / 24 shots)		Goalie stats		Danny aus den Birken (34 saves / 38 shots)

Mannheim won series 4–1

== Statistics ==
=== Scoring leaders ===
List shows the top skaters sorted by points, then goals.

Player	GP	G	A	Pts	+/−	PIM	POS
Jeremy Williams	52	30	27	57	+13	22	F
Jon Matsumoto	52	22	34	56	+1	18	F
Daniel Pietta	52	15	38	53	+8	24	F
Jacob Berglund	51	32	20	52	+4	46	F
Michael Connolly	52	15	37	52	+14	36	F
Chad Costello	52	17	35	52	+3	20	F
Philip Gogulla	52	26	26	52	+5	18	F
Mark Zengerle	46	14	38	52	+7	24	F
Jaedon Descheneau	52	19	32	51	−5	30	F
Chad Nehring	49	16	33	49	+1	36	F

=== Leading goaltenders ===
Only the top five goaltenders, based on save percentage, who have played at least 40% of their team's minutes, are included in this list.

Player	TOI	GA	GAA	SA	Sv%	SO
Mathias Niederberger	1976	72	2.19	1013	92.9	2
Danny aus den Birken	2099	67	1.91	907	92.6	5
Olivier Roy	2030	82	2.42	991	91.7	5
Kevin Poulin	2482	115	2.78	1351	91.5	4
Dustin Strahlmeier	2673	124	2.78	1437	91.4	3
