= 2015 Karjala Tournament =

2015 Karjala Tournament (Euro Hockey Games)
Tournament details
- Host countries: Finland; Sweden
- Cities: Helsinki; Örnsköldsvik
- Venues: 2 (in 2 host cities)
- Dates: 5–8 November 2015
- Teams: 4

Final positions
- Champions: Sweden (4th title)
- Runners-up: Finland
- Third place: Russia
- Fourth place: Czech Republic

Tournament statistics
- Games played: 6
- Goals scored: 35 (5.83 per game)
- Attendance: 42,301 (7,050 per game)
- Scoring leader(s): (Sweden) Linus Omark (Russia) Vadim Shipachyov (4 points)

The 2015 Karjala Tournament was played between 5 and 8 November 2015. The Czech Republic, Finland, Sweden and Russia played a round-robin for a total of three games per team and six games in total. Five of the matches were played in the Hartwall Areena in Helsinki, Finland, and one match in the Fjällräven Center in Örnsköldsvik, Sweden. The tournament was won by Sweden. The tournament was part of 2015–16 Euro Hockey Tour.

== Standings ==
Pos	Team	Pld	W	OTW	OTL	L	GF	GA	GD	Pts
1	Sweden	3	2	0	0	1	12	10	+2	6
2	Finland	3	2	0	0	1	6	5	+1	6
3	Russia	3	1	0	1	1	10	9	+1	4
4	Czech Republic	3	0	1	0	2	7	11	−4	2

Source: eurohockey

== Games ==
All times are local. Helsinki – (Eastern European Time – UTC+2) Örnsköldsvik – (Central European Time – UTC+1)

5 November 2015; 18:30	Finland	2–1 (1–1, 0–0, 1–0)	Russia	Hartwall Arena, Helsinki; Attendance: 7,631

Game reference

Juha Metsola
Goalies
Ilya Sorokin
Referees:
(Sweden) Mikael Sjöqvist
(Sweden) Marcus Linde
Linesmen:
(Finland) Pasi Nieminen
(Finland) Hannu Sormunen

	0–1	15:22 – I. Kovalchuck (I. Grigorenko, M. Grigoryev)
L. Kukkonen (T. Huhtala, A. Ohtamaa) – 16:56	1–1
P. Kontiola (S. Lepistö, J. Hietanen)(PP) – 49:58	2–1

2 min
Penalties
14 min
25
Shots
23

5 November 2015; 19:15	Sweden	6–2 (2–0, 2–0, 2–2)	Czech Republic	Fjällräven Center, Örnsköldsvik; Attendance: 5,735

Game reference

Viktor Fasth
Goalies
Jakub Kovář
Referees:
(Russia) Roman Gofman
(Russia) Alexei Ravodin
Linesmen:
(Sweden) Johannes Käck
(Sweden) Emil Yletyinen

J. Fransson (R. Rosén, R. Gynge)(PP) – 03:24	1–0
J. Ericsson (L. Omark, N. Danielsson)(PP) – 04:02	2–0
J. Lundqvist (D. Axelsson, M. Johansson) – 32:27	3–0
R. Rosén (R. Gynge, N. Danielsson) – 37:15	4–0
	4–1	50:59 – M. Gulaš (J. Buchtele)
M. Sörensen (J. Ericsson) – 53:29	5–1
	5–2	56:11 – J. Hruska
J. Lundqvist (S. Kronwall, J. Fransson) – 58:43	6–2

14 min
Penalties
16 min
27
Shots
22

7 November 2015; 13:00	Russia	6–3 (1–0, 3–2, 2–1)	Sweden	Hartwall Arena, Helsinki; Attendance: 4,377

Game reference

Vasily Koshechkin
Goalies
Henrik Karlsson
Referees:
(Finland) Mikko Kaukokari
(Finland) Stefan Fonselius
Linesmen:
(Finland) Hannu Sormunen
(Finland) Henri Neva

D. Apalkov (N. Gusev, V. Kartayev) – 09:03	1–0
	1–1	21:51 – L. Omark (D. Axelsson, S. Kronwall)
S. Mozyakin (V. Shipachyov) – 28:19	2–1
	2–2	30:03 – A. Engqvist (J. Ahnelöv, L. Omark)
N. Prokhorkin (D. Zaripov) – 38:43	3–2
V. Shipachyov (E. Dadonov) – 39:37	4–2
	4–3	43:26 R. Rosén (J. Fransson, M. Lundberg)(DP)
V. Shipachyov (S. Mozyakin, E. Dadonov) – 46:56	5–3
I. Kovalchuk (D. Apalkov)(EN) – 58:51	6–3

4 min
Penalties
4 min
37
Shots
25

7 November 2015; 17:00	Czech Republic	1–2 (0–0, 1–1, 0–1)	Finland	Hartwall Arena, Helsinki; Attendance: 9,879

Game reference

Dominik Furch
Goalies
Harri Säteri
Referees:
(Sweden) Mikael Sjöqvist
(Sweden) Marcus Linde
Linesmen:
(Finland) Joonas Saha
(Finland) Jani Pesonen

M. Gulaš (R. Šimek) – 29:58	1–0
	1–1	36:16 - T. Huhtala (H. Pesonen, A. Elorinne)
	1–2	41:20 – K. Kuusela (T. Huhtala, S. Lepistö)

2 min
Penalties
2 min
22
Shots
23

8 November 2015; 13:00	Russia	3–4 GWS (0–0, 1–1, 2–2) (OT 0–0) (SO: 0–1)	Czech Republic	Hartwall Arena, Helsinki; Attendance: 3,384

Game reference

Ilya Sorokin
Goalies
Jakub Kovář
Referees:
(Finland) Aleksi Rantala
(Finland) Jari-Pekka Pajula
Linesmen:
(Finland) Masi Puolakka
(Finland) Pasi Nieminen

	0–1	20:26 – T. Zohorna (V. Sobotka, L. Radil)
S. Shirokov (S. Mozyakin) – 24:51	1–1
M. Grigoryev (A. Tsvetkov, S. Shirokov) – 44:07	2–1
	2–2	49:41 – M. Doudera (J. Kovář) (PP)
	2–3	51:47 – M. Gulaš (D. Kubalík, M. Doudera)
V. Antipin (V. Shipachyov, E. Dadonov)(PP) – 55:41	3–3

V. Shipachyov
S. Mozyakin (miss)
S. Shirokov (miss)
Shootout
(miss) M. Gulaš
V. Sobotka
J. Kovář
6 min
Penalties
12 min
15
Shots
34

8 November 2015; 17:00	Finland	2–3 (0–1, 1–1, 1–1)	Sweden	Hartwall Arena, Helsinki; Attendance: 11,295

Game reference

Juha Metsola
Goalies
Viktor Fasth
Referees:
(Czech Republic) Jan Hribik
(Czech Republic) René Hradil
Linesmen:
(Finland) Sakari Suominen
(Finland) Markus Hägerström

	0–1	13:46 – J. Lundqvist (M. Johansson, D. Axelsson)
	0–2	23:43 – J. Ericsson (S. Kronwall, J. Norman)
S. Lepistö (J. Hietanen, O. Osala) (PP) – 34:48	1–2
	1–3	49:13 – L. Omark (P. Hersley) (PP)
K. Kuusela (T. Koivisto) (PP) – 59:52	2–3

4 min
Penalties
8 min
29
Shots
24

== Scoring leaders ==
Pos	Player	Country	GP	G	A	Pts	+/−	PIM	POS
1	Vadim Shipachyov	Russia	3	2	2	4	0	0	FW
2	Linus Omark	Sweden	3	2	2	4	+1	0	FW
3	Joel Lundqvist	Sweden	3	3	0	3	+1	2	FW
4	Milan Gulaš	Czech Republic	3	3	0	3	+1	4	FW
5	Jimmie Ericsson	Sweden	3	2	1	3	+2	0	FW
6	Robert Rosén	Sweden	3	2	1	3	-1	2	FW
7	Johan Fransson	Sweden	3	1	2	3	+1	0	DF
8	Sami Lepistö	Finland	3	1	2	3	0	0	DF
9	Sergei Mozyakin	Russia	3	1	2	3	+2	2	FW
10	Tommi Huhtala	Finland	3	1	2	3	+3	2	FW

GP = Games played; G = Goals; A = Assists; Pts = Points; +/− = Plus/minus; PIM = Penalties in minutes; POS = Position

Source: Swehockey

== Goaltending leaders ==
Pos	Player	Country	TOI	GA	GAA	Sv%	SO
1	Harri Säteri	Finland	60:00	1	1.00	95.45	0
2	Viktor Fasth	Sweden	120:00	4	2.00	92.16	0
3	Juha Metsola	Finland	118:18	4	2.03	91.49	0
4	Ilya Sorokin	Russia	123:56	5	2.42	91.38	0
5	Jakub Kovář	Czech Republic	125:00	9	4.32	78.57	0

TOI = Time On Ice (minutes:seconds); SA = Shots against; GA = Goals against; GAA = Goals against average; Sv% = Save percentage; SO = Shutouts

Source: Swehockey
