= Matthias Plachta =

German ice hockey player (born 1991)

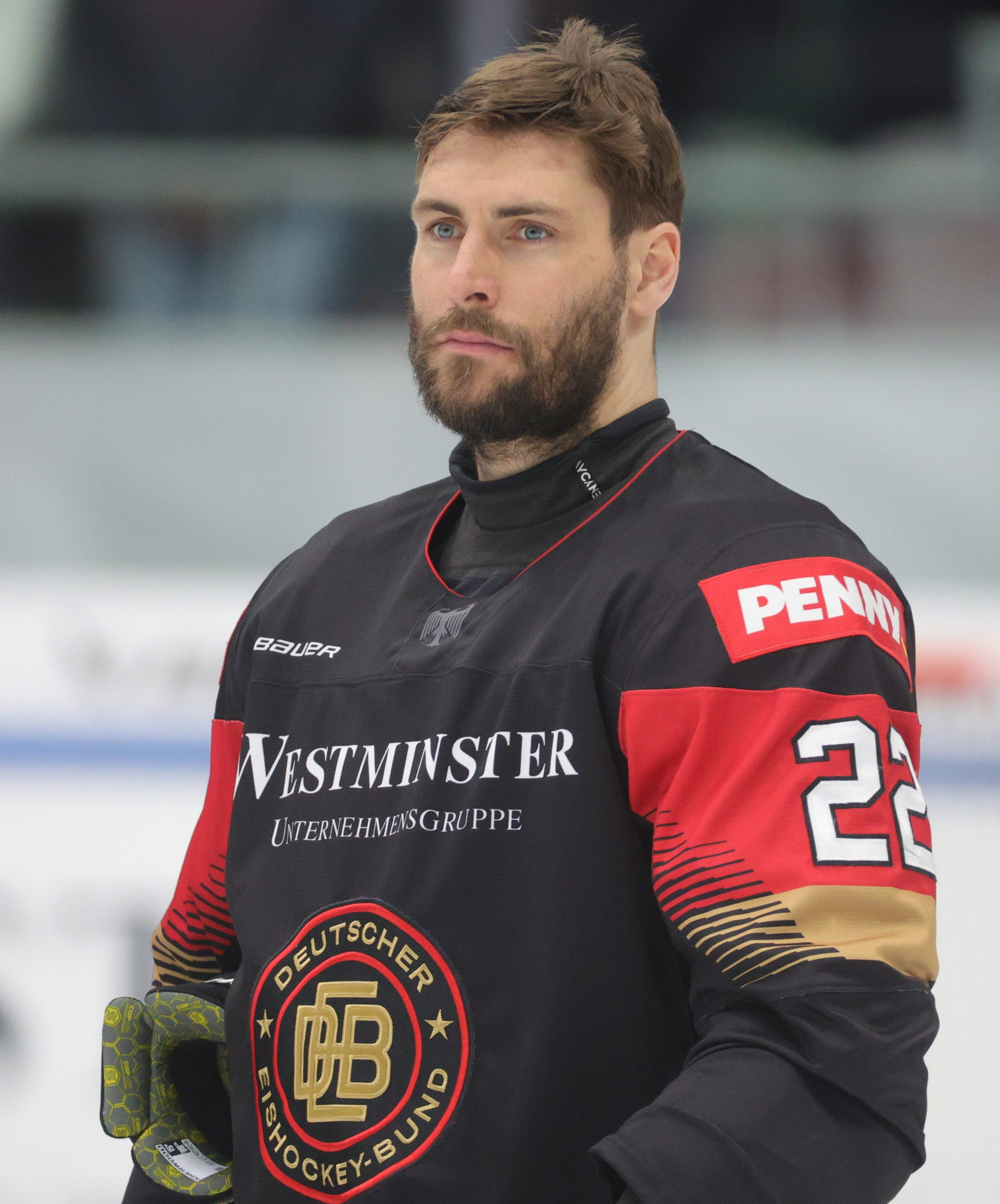
- Plachta in 2024
- Born: 16 May 1991 (age 35) Freiburg im Breisgau, Germany
- Height: 6 ft 2 in (188 cm)
- Weight: 205 lb (93 kg; 14 st 9 lb)
- Position: Forward
- Shoots: Left
- DEL team Former teams: Adler Mannheim; Springfield Falcons; Wilkes-Barre/Scranton Penguins
- National team: Germany
- NHL draft: Undrafted
- Playing career: 2009–present

Matthias Plachta (born 16 May 1991) is a German professional ice hockey forward who is currently playing for Adler Mannheim of the Deutsche Eishockey Liga (DEL). He is the son of Jacek Płachta, a former player and coach of the Poland men's national ice hockey team.

== Playing career ==
Plachta played for Schwenningen and Mannheim as a junior and made his debut in Germany's second division for Heilbronn during the 2008–09 season. The following season, he logged first minutes in Germany's top-flight Deutsche Eishockey Liga (DEL) with Adler Mannheim. After six seasons in the DEL, including winning the title with Mannheim in 2015, and having secured a role in the German national team, Plachta was signed to a one-year entry-level contract with the Arizona Coyotes of the National Hockey League (NHL) on 28 May 2015.

In his debut North American season in 2015–16, Plachta was assigned to Arizona's AHL affiliate, the Springfield Falcons. In 46 games with the Falcons, Plachta compiled two goals and 7 points before the Coyotes traded him on trade deadline day along with a conditional 7th-round draft pick in 2017 to the Pittsburgh Penguins in exchange for Sergei Plotnikov on 29 February 2016. Plachta played a total of 30 contests for Pittsburgh's AHL affiliate Wilkes-Barre Scranton Penguins during the season.

Having not been allowed to play in the NHL during the season, and with Pittsburgh opting not to extend a qualifying offer, Plachta returned to Germany, returning to Adler Mannheim on 30 June 2016 with the signing of a four-year deal.

== International play ==
He represented Germany at the 2018 IIHF World Championship.

== Career statistics ==
=== Regular season and playoffs ===
			Regular season					Playoffs
Season	Team	League	GP	G	A	Pts	PIM	GP	G	A	Pts	PIM
2006–07	Jungadler Mannheim	DNL	31	3	4	7	0	6	1	0	1	0
2007–08	Jungadler Mannheim	DNL	34	11	23	34	24	8	5	4	9	12
2008–09	Jungadler Mannheim	DNL	25	15	21	36	26	8	6	6	12	6
2008–09	Heilbronner Falken	GER.2	10	0	0	0	2	3	1	0	1	0
2009–10	Heilbronner Falken	GER.2	43	6	8	14	59	6	0	0	0	2
2009–10	Adler Mannheim	DEL	3	0	0	0	0	—	—	—	—	—
2010–11	Adler Mannheim	DEL	45	7	7	14	8	6	0	0	0	2
2010–11	Heilbronner Falken	GER.2	4	1	2	3	4	—	—	—	—	—
2011–12	Adler Mannheim	DEL	49	4	3	7	32	14	0	1	1	6
2012–13	Adler Mannheim	DEL	42	12	10	22	14	6	2	2	4	2
2013–14	Adler Mannheim	DEL	45	4	8	12	38	3	0	0	0	2
2014–15	Adler Mannheim	DEL	47	14	21	35	73	15	5	4	9	6
2015–16	Springfield Falcons	AHL	46	2	5	7	16	—	—	—	—	—
2015–16	Wilkes–Barre/Scranton Penguins	AHL	20	2	5	7	22	10	1	1	2	19
2016–17	Adler Mannheim	DEL	35	14	15	29	24	7	6	1	7	12
2017–18	Adler Mannheim	DEL	52	12	21	33	56	9	2	3	5	31
2018–19	Adler Mannheim	DEL	40	16	16	32	18	14	5	7	12	10
2019–20	Adler Mannheim	DEL	48	14	30	44	22	—	—	—	—	—
2020–21	Adler Mannheim	DEL	33	11	17	28	28	6	0	3	3	0
2021–22	Adler Mannheim	DEL	38	11	22	33	26	9	3	2	5	4
2022–23	Adler Mannheim	DEL	53	13	35	48	31	12	6	3	9	18
2023–24	Adler Mannheim	DEL	36	21	24	45	20	7	1	5	6	6
2024–25	Adler Mannheim	DEL	51	12	18	30	32	10	2	7	9	16
DEL totals			617	165	247	412	422	118	32	39	71	115

Medal record

Representing Germany

Ice hockey

Olympic Games
Silver medal – second place	2018 Pyeongchang	

=== International ===
Year	Team	Event	Result	GP	G	A	Pts	PIM
2008	Germany	U17	9th	5	2	0	2	6
2009	Germany	WJC18	10th	6	3	2	5	6
2010	Germany	WJC D1	11th	5	2	5	7	4
2011	Germany	WJC	10th	6	1	1	2	16
2014	Germany	WC	14th	6	1	0	1	0
2015	Germany	WC	10th	7	2	0	2	0
2017	Germany	WC	8th	8	1	0	1	2
2018	Germany	OG	2nd place, silver medalist(s)	7	1	1	2	4
2018	Germany	WC	11th	7	0	5	5	4
2019	Germany	WC	6th	8	2	3	5	0
2021	Germany	WC	4th	10	4	4	8	16
2022	Germany	OG	10th	4	0	1	1	2
2022	Germany	WC	7th	7	3	1	4	4
Junior totals				22	8	8	16	32
Senior totals				64	14	15	29	32

== Awards and honours ==
Award	Year
DEL
Champion (Adler Mannheim)	2015, 2019
