= David Elsner =

German ice hockey player

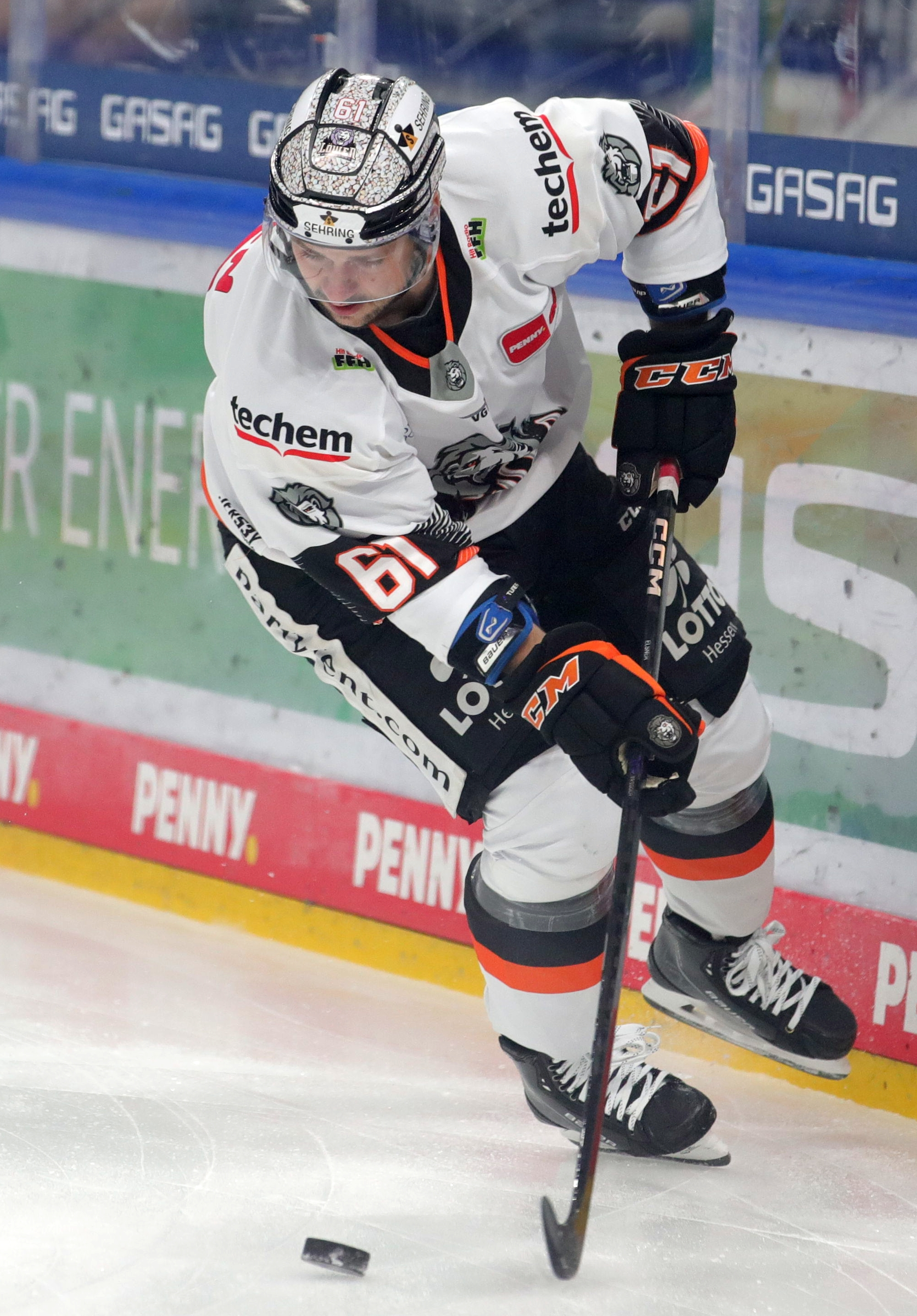
- Born: 22 March 1992 (age 34) Landshut, Germany
- Height: 6 ft 0 in (183 cm)
- Weight: 183 lb (83 kg; 13 st 1 lb)
- Position: Right wing
- Shoots: Right
- Oberliga team Former teams: 1. EV Weiden; Thomas Sabo Ice Tigers; ERC Ingolstadt; Straubing Tigers; Löwen Frankfurt
- NHL draft: 194th overall, 2010; Nashville Predators
- Playing career: 2011–present

David Elsner (born 22 March 1992) is a German professional ice hockey right winger currently playing for 1. EV Weiden of the Oberliga.

== Playing career ==
Born in Landshut, Germany, Elsner began his professional career with his hometown team the Landshut Cannibals. He was then drafted 194th overall by the Nashville Predators in the 2010 NHL entry draft. Elsner made his DEL debut for ERC Ingolstadt during the 2010-11 DEL season where he played three games and scored one goal.

In 2011, Elsner moved to Canada to play in the Ontario Hockey League for the Sault Ste. Marie Greyhounds for one season before returning to Landshut the following year. On 26 April 2013 Elsner moved to the Thomas Sabo Ice Tigers of the DEL. On 18 May 2015 Elsner returned to Ingolstadt. He would sign a further extension at Ingolstadt in 2016, 2017, and 2019.

Returning to his former club, Löwen Frankfurt in their first season in the top flight DEL in the 2022–23 season, Elsner contributed with 9 goals and 11 points through 42 regular season games. Following their defeat in the playoff qualifiers to Düsseldorfer EG, Elsner left at the conclusion of his contract on 19 March 2023.

== Career statistics ==
=== Regular season and playoffs ===
			Regular season					Playoffs
Season	Team	League	GP	G	A	Pts	PIM	GP	G	A	Pts	PIM
2007–08	EV Landshut	DNL	36	11	8	19	12	3	1	0	1	4
2008–09	EV Landshut	DNL	36	17	18	35	46	9	2	8	10	10
2009–10	EV Landshut	DNL	17	10	7	17	63	5	2	4	6	12
2009–10	Landshut Cannibals	2.GBun	29	6	3	9	6	6	0	0	0	16
2010–11	EV Landshut	DNL	6	2	4	6	6	9	5	4	9	2
2010–11	Landshut Cannibals	2.GBun	31	4	1	5	65	6	0	1	1	6
2010–11	ERC Ingolstadt	DEL	3	1	0	1	0	—	—	—	—	—
2011–12	Sault Ste. Marie Greyhounds	OHL	48	7	7	14	10	—	—	—	—	—
2012–13	Landshut Cannibals	2.GBun	47	12	20	32	107	6	1	1	2	10
2013–14	Thomas Sabo Ice Tigers	DEL	36	3	5	8	30	3	0	0	0	4
2013–14	EV Landshut	DEL2	2	2	1	3	2	—	—	—	—	—
2014–15	Thomas Sabo Ice Tigers	DEL	19	0	1	1	16	—	—	—	—	—
2014–15	Löwen Frankfurt	DEL2	29	12	14	26	67	10	6	6	12	6
2015–16	ERC Ingolstadt	DEL	33	3	5	3	22	2	0	0	0	0
2015–16	ESV Kaufbeuren	DEL2	8	0	1	1	2	—	—	—	—	—
2016–17	ERC Ingolstadt	DEL	49	10	9	19	35	2	3	0	3	0
2017–18	ERC Ingolstadt	DEL	49	7	8	15	31	5	1	1	2	2
2018–19	ERC Ingolstadt	DEL	50	15	14	29	18	7	3	1	4	2
2019–20	ERC Ingolstadt	DEL	47	12	13	25	12	—	—	—	—	—
2020–21	ERC Ingolstadt	DEL	34	5	8	13	2	4	0	0	0	0
2021–22	Straubing Tigers	DEL	36	7	8	15	2	4	1	1	2	0
2022–23	Löwen Frankfurt	DEL	42	9	2	11	19	—	—	—	—	—
DEL totals			398	72	73	145	187	27	8	3	11	8

=== International ===
Year	Team	Event	Result	GP	G	A	Pts	PIM
2009	Germany	U17	6th	5	0	0	0	6
2010	Germany	WJC18-D1	11th	5	0	4	4	14
2012	Germany	WJC-D1	11th	5	4	5	9	8
Junior totals				15	4	9	13	28

== See also ==
- List of select Jewish ice hockey players
