= Mark Katic =

Canadian ice hockey player

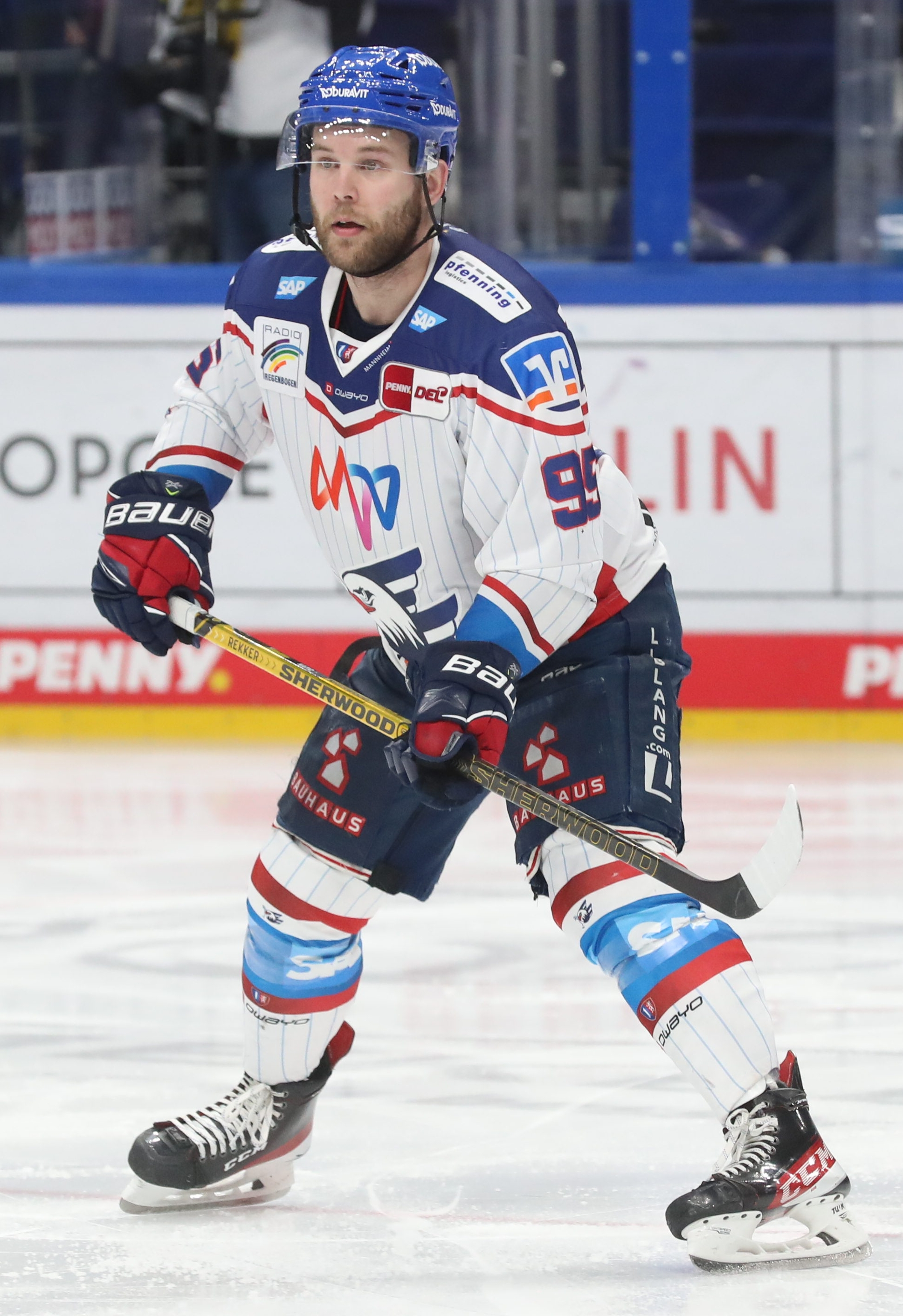
- Born: May 9, 1989 (age 37) Timmins, Ontario, Canada
- Height: 5 ft 11 in (180 cm)
- Weight: 185 lb (84 kg; 13 st 3 lb)
- Position: Defence
- Shot: Left
- Played for: New York Islanders; Eisbären Berlin; KHL Medveščak Zagreb; Skellefteå AIK; Adler Mannheim; EC VSV
- National team: Croatia
- NHL draft: 62nd overall, 2007; New York Islanders
- Playing career: 2009–2026

Mark Katic (born May 9, 1989) is a Canadian born Croatian former professional ice hockey player. Katic last played for EC VSV in the ICE Hockey League (ICEHL). Katic played previously with the New York Islanders of the National Hockey League (NHL). Katic is of Croatian descent.

== Playing career ==
Katic was selected by the New York Islanders in the third round (62nd overall) of the 2007 NHL entry draft.

He made his NHL debut on February 24, 2011, when he was called up from the Bridgeport Sound Tigers, on an emergency basis, to play defence in an away game against the Philadelphia Flyers. In his first NHL game he recorded an assist and logged 15:37 of ice time, although the Flyers beat the Islanders 4–3 in overtime.

On July 4, 2012, it was announced that Katic has signed a contract with six time German champion Eisbären Berlin. He helped the Eisbären team win the 2012-13 national German championship.

On June 12, 2013, it was announced that Katic has signed a contract with KHL Medveščak Zagreb from Croatia, newest member of KHL. In December 2016, Katic won the Spengler Cup with Team Canada. He left Zagreb on February 13, 2017, and transferred to Skellefteå AIK of the Swedish Hockey League (SHL). In the 2017–18 campaign, Katic won silver in the SHL.

In April 2018, Katic inked a two-year deal with German DEL side, Adler Mannheim.

Katic remained with Adler Mannheim for five seasons before leaving as a free agent to sign in the neighbouring ICEHL, on a one-year contract with EC VSV, on April 28, 2023.

On April 10, 2026, it was announced that they defender had retired from professional hockey.

== International Play ==
Born in Canada, Katic represents Croatia in international play. He previously represented Canada in the Ivan Hlinka Memorial Tournament and the Spengler Cup tournaments.

== Career statistics ==
			Regular season					Playoffs
Season	Team	League	GP	G	A	Pts	PIM	GP	G	A	Pts	PIM
2005–06	Sarnia Sting	OHL	51	5	29	34	33	—	—	—	—	—
2006–07	Sarnia Sting	OHL	68	5	35	40	31	4	1	3	4	8
2007–08	Sarnia Sting	OHL	45	5	26	31	28	6	0	3	3	8
2008–09	Sarnia Sting	OHL	63	13	41	54	45	4	1	0	1	6
2009–10	Bridgeport Sound Tigers	AHL	48	3	11	14	16	—	—	—	—	—
2010–11	Bridgeport Sound Tigers	AHL	63	4	26	30	37	—	—	—	—	—
2010–11	New York Islanders	NHL	11	0	1	1	4	—	—	—	—	—
2011–12	Bridgeport Sound Tigers	AHL	14	0	4	4	6	1	0	0	0	0
2012–13	Eisbären Berlin	DEL	47	6	13	19	22	13	1	0	1	0
2013–14	KHL Medveščak Zagreb	KHL	44	1	10	11	18	4	0	0	0	32
2014–15	KHL Medveščak Zagreb	KHL	32	4	5	9	37	—	—	—	—	—
2015–16	KHL Medveščak Zagreb	KHL	52	3	7	10	8	—	—	—	—	—
2016–17	KHL Medveščak Zagreb	KHL	57	6	20	26	24	—	—	—	—	—
2016–17	Skellefteå AIK	SHL	4	0	2	2	25	7	1	0	1	0
2017–18	Skellefteå AIK	SHL	51	4	17	21	28	16	0	3	3	2
2018–19	Adler Mannheim	DEL	51	3	29	32	0	14	4	10	14	2
2019–20	Adler Mannheim	DEL	51	6	30	36	4	—	—	—	—	—
2020–21	Adler Mannheim	DEL	33	4	13	17	6	6	1	2	3	0
2021–22	Adler Mannheim	DEL	31	6	14	20	10	9	0	8	8	0
2022–23	Adler Mannheim	DEL	50	5	14	19	8	4	1	0	1	2
NHL totals			11	0	1	1	4	—	—	—	—	—
DEL totals			263	30	113	143	50	46	7	20	27	4

== Awards and honours ==
Award	Year
OHL
All-Rookie Team	2006
CHL Top Prospects Game	2007
DEL
Champion (Eisbären Berlin)	2013
Champion (Adler Mannheim)	2019
International
Spengler Cup	2016
