= Cody Lampl =

American and German ice hockey player

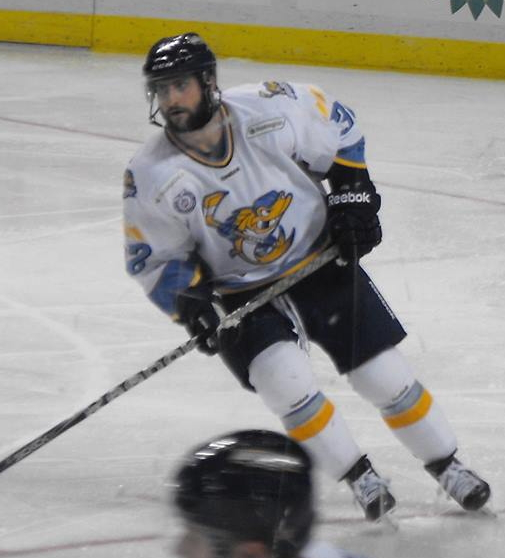
- Born: June 19, 1986 (age 39); Ketchum, Idaho, U.S.
- Height: 5 ft 10 in (178 cm)
- Weight: 165 lb (75 kg; 11 st 11 lb)
- Position: Defense
- Shot: Right
- Played for: Abbotsford Heat; Grand Rapids Griffins; St. John's IceCaps; Fischtown Pinguins; Adler Mannheim; Straubing Tigers
- NHL draft: Undrafted
- Playing career: 2009–2024

Cody Lampl (born June 19, 1986) is an American-German former professional ice hockey defenseman who played in the Deutsche Eishockey Liga (DEL).

His grandparents emigrated from Germany to the United States and he holds a German passport.

== Playing career ==
On September 12, 2011, shortly before the start of the 2011-12 season, the Idaho Steelheads traded Lampl to the Utah Grizzlies in return for future considerations.

On August 21, 2012, Lampl joined the Toledo Walleye of the ECHL, agreeing to a one-year contract as a free agent.

Lampl received an invitation to participate in the St. John's IceCaps training camp ahead of the 2013–14 season. Just before the season opener, he signed a one-year AHL contract with the team on October 5, 2013.

On August 12, 2014, Lampl rejoined the Toledo Walleye, signing a one-year contract for the 2014–15 season. He spent the entire year with the team, achieving personal bests with 8 goals and 30 points over 62 games. Following the team's exit in the Conference Finals, Lampl agreed to terms with German club Fischtown Pinguins of the DEL2 on May 29, 2015. The Pinguins were later awarded a license to compete in Germany’s top-tier league, the Deutsche Eishockey Liga (DEL), beginning with the 2016–17 season.

Following three seasons with Fischtown, Lampl signed a two-year deal with Adler Mannheim as a free agent on April 16, 2018.

Lampl played three seasons with Adler Mannheim before joining his third team in the DEL, the Straubing Tigers, by signing a one-year contract on May 7, 2021.

== Career statistics ==
| | | | Regular season | | | | | Playoffs |
| Season | Team | League | GP | G | A | Pts | PIM | GP | G | A | Pts | PIM |
|---|---|---|---|---|---|---|---|---|---|---|---|---|
| 2003–04 | Sioux Falls Stampede | USHL | 17 | 1 | 2 | 3 | 8 | — | — | — | — | — |
| 2003–04 | Danville Wings | USHL | 33 | 2 | 7 | 9 | 12 | 5 | 0 | 1 | 1 | 2 |
| 2004–05 | Chicago Steel | USHL | 55 | 4 | 18 | 22 | 30 | 8 | 0 | 0 | 0 | 2 |
| 2005–06 | Colorado College | WCHA | 20 | 0 | 0 | 0 | 8 | — | — | — | — | — |
| 2006–07 | Colorado College | WCHA | 37 | 2 | 7 | 9 | 24 | — | — | — | — | — |
| 2007–08 | Colorado College | WCHA | 13 | 1 | 2 | 3 | 8 | — | — | — | — | — |
| 2008–09 | Colorado College | WCHA | 16 | 3 | 5 | 8 | 43 | — | — | — | — | — |
| 2008–09 | Las Vegas Wranglers | ECHL | 3 | 0 | 1 | 1 | 0 | — | — | — | — | — |
| 2009–10 | Idaho Steelheads | ECHL | 44 | 1 | 12 | 13 | 45 | 12 | 0 | 2 | 2 | 4 |
| 2010–11 | Idaho Steelheads | ECHL | 53 | 0 | 15 | 15 | 50 | 5 | 0 | 0 | 0 | 17 |
| 2010–11 | Abbotsford Heat | AHL | 1 | 0 | 0 | 0 | 2 | — | — | — | — | — |
| 2011–12 | Utah Grizzlies | ECHL | 50 | 1 | 12 | 13 | 98 | 3 | 0 | 1 | 1 | 0 |
| 2012–13 | Toledo Walleye | ECHL | 64 | 6 | 9 | 15 | 127 | 6 | 1 | 1 | 2 | 4 |
| 2012–13 | Grand Rapids Griffins | AHL | 1 | 0 | 1 | 1 | 0 | — | — | — | — | — |
| 2013–14 | St. John's IceCaps | AHL | 38 | 0 | 0 | 0 | 32 | — | — | — | — | — |
| 2014–15 | Toledo Walleye | ECHL | 62 | 8 | 22 | 30 | 112 | 21 | 2 | 5 | 7 | 14 |
| 2015–16 | Fischtown Pinguins | DEL2 | 50 | 8 | 21 | 29 | 124 | 7 | 3 | 1 | 4 | 0 |
| 2016–17 | Fischtown Pinguins | DEL | 47 | 7 | 23 | 30 | 120 | 6 | 0 | 2 | 2 | 8 |
| 2017–18 | Fischtown Pinguins | DEL | 52 | 7 | 13 | 20 | 26 | 7 | 1 | 2 | 3 | 33 |
| 2018–19 | Adler Mannheim | DEL | 34 | 1 | 6 | 7 | 10 | 2 | 2 | 0 | 2 | 0 |
| 2019–20 | Adler Mannheim | DEL | 45 | 0 | 6 | 6 | 44 | — | — | — | — | — |
| 2020–21 | Adler Mannheim | DEL | 2 | 0 | 0 | 0 | 0 | — | — | — | — | — |
| 2021–22 | Straubing Tigers | DEL | 46 | 2 | 11 | 13 | 64 | 4 | 0 | 0 | 0 | 2 |
| 2022–23 | Straubing Tigers | DEL | 46 | 2 | 3 | 5 | 54 | 3 | 0 | 0 | 0 | 0 |
| 2023–24 | Straubing Tigers | DEL | 29 | 0 | 1 | 1 | 13 | 9 | 0 | 0 | 0 | 29 |
| AHL totals | | | 40 | 0 | 1 | 1 | 34 | — | — | — | — | — |
| DEL totals | | | 301 | 19 | 63 | 82 | 331 | 31 | 3 | 4 | 7 | 72 |

== Awards and honors ==
| Award | Year |
|---|---|
DEL
| Champion (Adler Mannheim) | 2019 |
