= Kevin Poulin =

Canadian ice hockey player (born 1990)

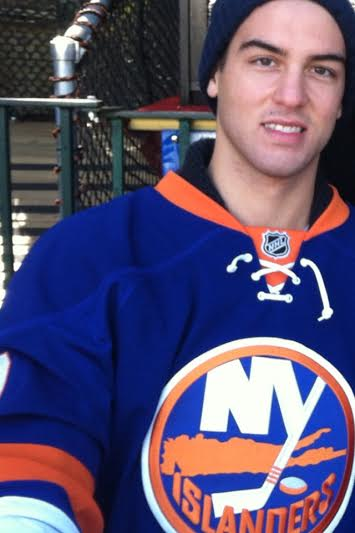
- Poulin with the New York Islanders in 2013
- Born: April 12, 1990 (age 36) Montreal, Quebec, Canada
- Height: 6 ft 2 in (188 cm)
- Weight: 210 lb (95 kg; 15 st 0 lb)
- Position: Goaltender
- Caught: Left
- Played for: New York Islanders; Barys Astana; KHL Medveščak Zagreb; EHC Kloten; Eisbären Berlin; IF Björklöven
- National team: Canada
- NHL draft: 126th overall, 2008; New York Islanders
- Playing career: 2010–2023

Kevin Bureau-Poulin (born April 12, 1990) is a Canadian former professional ice hockey goaltender. Poulin was selected by the National Hockey League (NHL)'s New York Islanders in the fifth round, 126th overall, of the 2008 NHL entry draft.

== Playing career ==
Poulin first played major junior hockey in 2006 for the Victoriaville Tigres of the Quebec Major Junior Hockey League (QMJHL), posting a 3.34 Goals against average (GAA) and a .896 save percentage in 24 games. In 2008, Poulin was drafted by the New York Islanders in the fifth round, 126th overall, in the 2008 NHL entry draft. He continued to play in Victoriaville until his final year of major junior in 2010, posting 2.63 GAA and .916 save percentage, his best career QMJHL numbers.

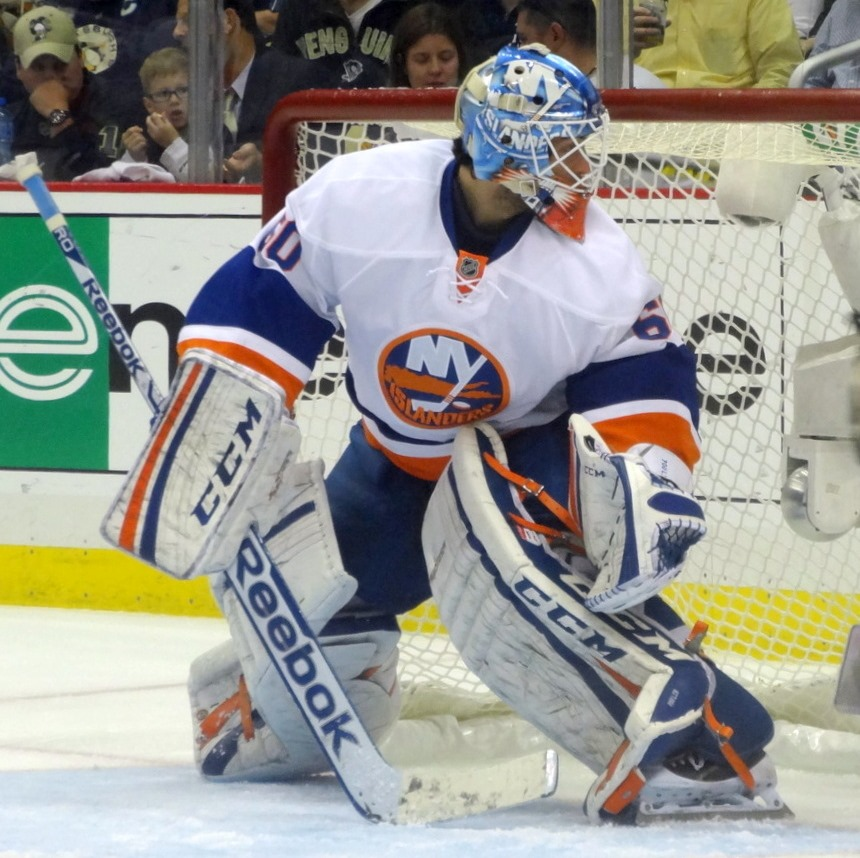
With the Islanders during the 2013 Stanley Cup playoffs

Poulin began the 2010–11 season playing with the Islanders' American Hockey League (AHL) affiliate, the Bridgeport Sound Tigers, but on January 4, 2011, was recalled to the NHL due to an injury to Rick DiPietro. Poulin made his NHL debut on January 6, 2011, in relief against the Edmonton Oilers. His first NHL start was two days later on January 8 against the Colorado Avalanche. On February 8, he injured his knee during warmups and later had season ending surgery. On February 23, 2013, Poulin was recalled to replace DiPietro, who was placed on waivers a day before and then cleared waivers prior to being sent to the Sound Tigers.

As the backup for Evgeni Nabokov during the 2012–13 season, Poulin had one win, three losses and a 3.02 GAA and .893 save percentage in four starts for the Islanders, as well as relieving Nabokov once. Entering the Stanley Cup playoffs for the first time since 2007 as the eighth seed in the Eastern Conference against the top-seeded Pittsburgh Penguins, Poulin replaced Nabokov in Game 1. and Game 5, The Islanders were eliminated in six games. Poulin finished the playoffs with a 1.15 GAA and .933 save percentage.

On September 27, 2015, the Islanders placed Poulin on waivers for assignment to the AHL, where he was claimed by the Tampa Bay Lightning. On November 12, 2015, after playing no games for the Lightning, Poulin was traded to the Calgary Flames in exchange for future considerations.

On October 27, 2016, Poulin was signed by Barys Astana of the Kontinental Hockey League (KHL). He made 14 appearances for the club throughout the 2016–17 season. In October 2017, he was acquired by KHL Medveščak Zagreb, a Croatian team competing in the Austrian Hockey League. In late December 2017, he helped Team Canada win the prestigious Spengler Cup in Davos, coming up with an impressive performance in the championship game.

On January 14, 2018, Poulin left Medveščak Zagreb to join EHC Kloten of the Swiss National League for the remainder of the 2017–18 season. During the 2018–19 season Poulin posted a 22–20–0 record, with a 2.80 GAA and 0.915 save percentage for Eisbären Berlin.

Having returned to North America prior to the 2019–20 season, on December 26, 2019, the Grand Rapids Griffins signed Poulin to a professional tryout (PTO). He made 3 appearances with the Griffins before he was released from his try-out. On February 7, 2020, he was signed to his second PTO, joining the Ontario Reign, affiliate to the Los Angeles Kings. He was later signed to a one-year NHL contract with the Kings for the remainder of the season to serve as the Reign's backup on February 22, 2020. He appeared in 4 games with the Reign before the remainder of the 2019–20 season was cancelled due to the COVID-19 pandemic.

As a free agent from the Kings, Poulin opted to return to Europe by agreeing to an optional two-year contract with Swedish second-tier club, IF Björklöven of the HockeyAllsvenskan, on July 7, 2020. In the 2020–21 season, Poulin as the starting goaltender led IF Björklöven to a third-place finish in the regular season, posting 20 wins through 30 appearances. He helped IF Björklöven advance to the qualification finals, before losing to Timrå IK.

On June 29, 2021, Poulin opted to end his tenure in Sweden, agreeing to a one-year contract with the Montreal Canadiens, AHL affiliate and hometown club the Laval Rocket. He split time with Rocket and the Canadiens' ECHL affiliate, the Trois-Rivières Lions. He was re-signed by the Rocket to a one-year contract extension for the 2022–23 season on July 19, 2022.

== International play ==
Medal record

Representing Canada

Ice hockey

Olympic Games
Bronze medal – third place	2018 Pyeongchang	

During the 2017–18 season, Poulin was selected to represent Canada at the 2018 Winter Olympics in Pyeongchang, South Korea. Poulin collected 3 wins in 4 games to help Canada claim the bronze medal.

== Career statistics ==
=== Regular season and playoffs ===
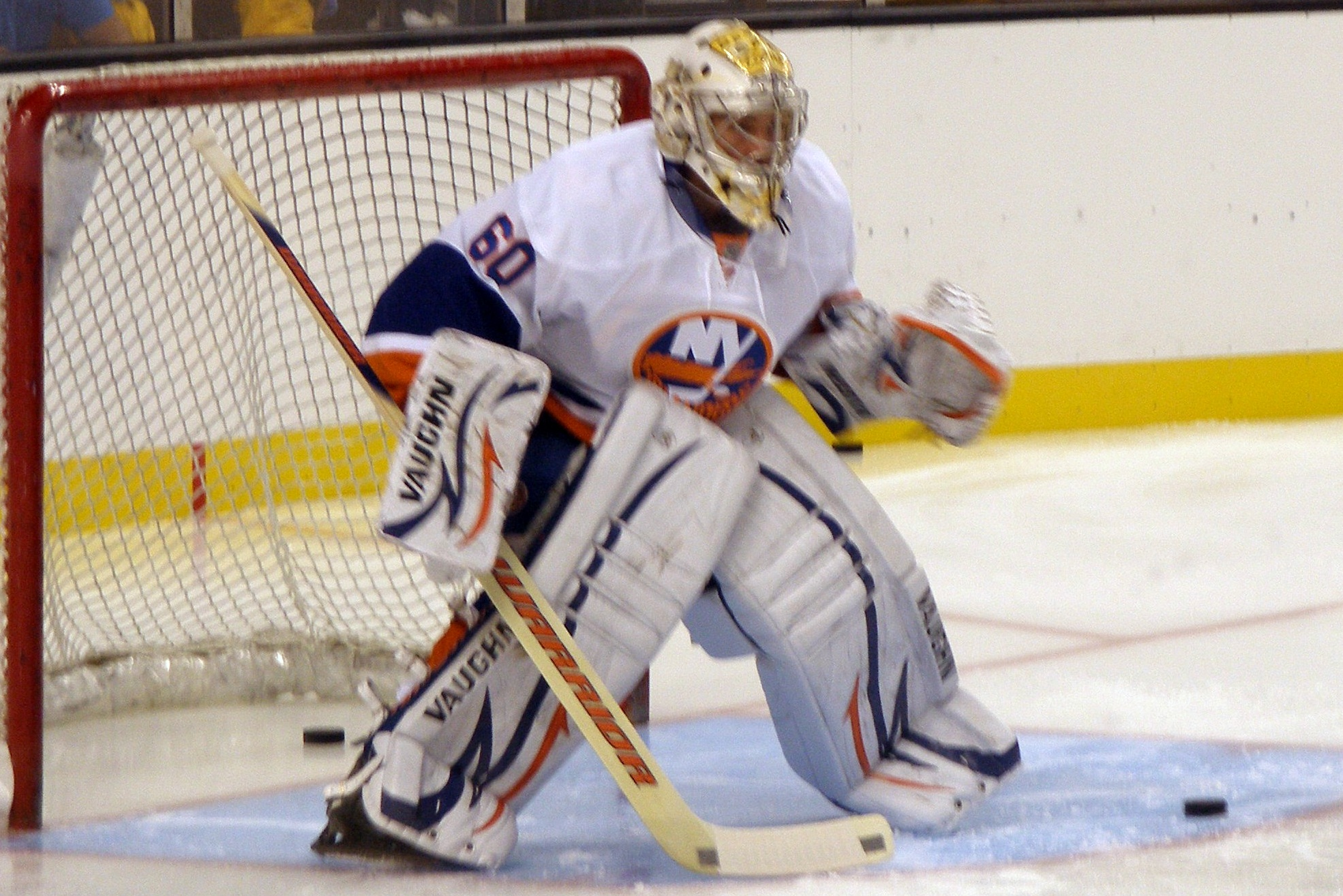
2010 preseason with the Islanders

			Regular season									Playoffs
Season	Team	League	GP	W	L	T/OT	MIN	GA	SO	GAA	SV%	GP	W	L	MIN	GA	SO	GAA	SV%
2006–07	Victoriaville Tigres	QJMHL	24	10	6	0	1220	68	0	3.34	.896	2	0	0	41	5	0	7.20	.808
2007–08	Victoriaville Tigres	QJMHL	52	18	23	3	2734	171	0	3.75	.885	6	2	4	279	27	0	5.80	.846
2008–09	Victoriaville Tigres	QJMHL	39	18	16	3	1220	114	1	3.01	.905	4	0	4	249	18	0	4.34	.903
2009–10	Victoriaville Tigres	QJMHL	54	35	16	0	3105	136	7	2.63	.916	16	10	6	971	46	0	2.84	.918
2010–11	Bridgeport Sound Tigers	AHL	15	10	5	0	903	33	2	2.19	.932	—	—	—	—	—	—	—	—
2010–11	New York Islanders	NHL	10	4	2	1	491	20	0	2.44	.924	—	—	—	—	—	—	—	—
2011–12	Bridgeport Sound Tigers	AHL	49	26	18	4	2943	137	3	2.79	.912	3	0	3	194	10	0	3.09	.917
2011–12	New York Islanders	NHL	6	2	4	0	296	15	0	3.04	.907	—	—	—	—	—	—	—	—
2012–13	Bridgeport Sound Tigers	AHL	32	15	14	3	1824	98	1	3.22	.904	—	—	—	—	—	—	—	—
2012–13	New York Islanders	NHL	5	1	3	0	258	13	0	3.02	.893	2	0	0	52	1	0	1.15	.933
2013–14	New York Islanders	NHL	28	11	16	1	1625	89	0	3.29	.891	—	—	—	—	—	—	—	—
2013–14	Bridgeport Sound Tigers	AHL	15	2	12	1	904	40	0	2.65	.910	—	—	—	—	—	—	—	—
2014–15	Bridgeport Sound Tigers	AHL	45	16	21	7	2612	125	2	2.87	.912	—	—	—	—	—	—	—	—
2014–15	New York Islanders	NHL	1	0	0	1	65	3	0	2.77	.885	—	—	—	—	—	—	—	—
2015–16	Stockton Heat	AHL	29	14	11	3	1701	81	2	2.86	.909	—	—	—	—	—	—	—	—
2016–17	Laval Predators	LNAH	1	0	1	0	59	5	0	5.06	.853	—	—	—	—	—	—	—	—
2016–17	Barys Astana	KHL	14	6	6	0	768	34	1	2.66	.909	—	—	—	—	—	—	—	—
2017–18	KHL Medveščak Zagreb	EBEL	22	—	—	—	1274	64	0	3.01	.913	—	—	—	—	—	—	—	—
2017–18	EHC Kloten	NL	2	1	1	0	119	7	0	3.53	.868	—	—	—	—	—	—	—	—
2018–19	Eisbären Berlin	DEL	43	22	20	0	2462	115	3	2.80	.915	8	4	4	499	20	2	2.00	.930
2019–20	Grand Rapids Griffins	AHL	3	0	1	2	189	7	0	2.22	.915	—	—	—	—	—	—	—	—
2019–20	Ontario Reign	AHL	4	2	1	0	199	10	0	3.01	.914	—	—	—	—	—	—	—	—
2020–21	IF Björklöven	Allsv	30	20	9	0	1638	61	3	2.23	.915	16	8	8	932	57	0	3.67	.881
2021–22	Trois-Rivières Lions	ECHL	8	2	5	1	481	26	0	3.24	.894	—	—	—	—	—	—	—	—
2021–22	Laval Rocket	AHL	30	18	8	3	1747	68	2	2.34	.920	1	0	1	59	4	0	4.07	.867
2022–23	Laval Rocket	AHL	28	12	12	3	1625	86	0	3.18	.890	—	—	—	—	—	—	—	—
NHL totals			50	18	25	3	2736	140	0	3.07	.899	2	0	0	52	1	0	1.15	.933

=== International ===
Year	Team	Event	Result	GP	W	L	T	MIN	SH	GA	SO	GAA	SV%
2017	Canada	SC	1st place, gold medalist(s)	3	3	0	0	180	102	3	1	1.00	.971
2018	Canada	OG	3rd place, bronze medalist(s)	4	2	1	0	213	83	8	2	2.25	.904
Senior totals				7	5	1	0	393	185	11	3	1.68	.941

== Awards and honours ==
Awards	Year
QMJHL
Second All-Star Team	2009–10
