= Tommi Huhtala =

Finnish ice hockey player

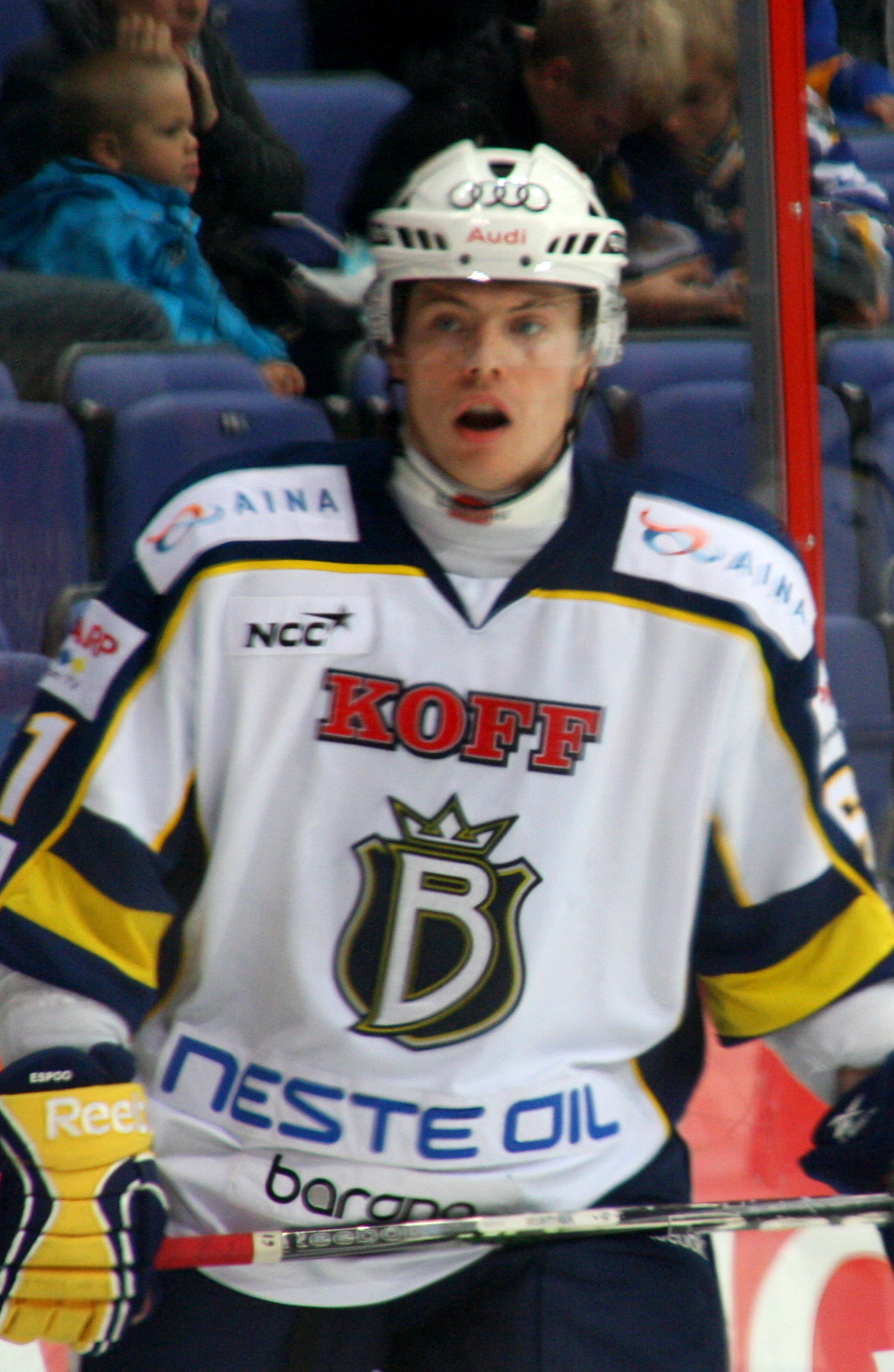
- Born: December 7, 1987 (age 38) Tampere, Finland
- Height: 6 ft 0 in (183 cm)
- Weight: 198 lb (90 kg; 14 st 2 lb)
- Position: Left wing
- Shot: Left
- Played for: Ilves; Porin Ässät; Espoo Blues; Jokerit; Adler Mannheim; HV71
- National team: Finland
- Playing career: 2005–2023

Medal record

Representing Finland

Ice hockey

World Championships
Silver medal – second place	2014 Belarus	

Tommi Huhtala (born December 7, 1987) is a Finnish professional ice hockey left winger who currently plays for Kiekko-Espoo in the Mestis.

== Playing career ==
He previously played with Espoo Blues of the Liiga. On April 7, 2014, Huhtala left the Blues to sign a two-year contract with fellow Finnish club, Jokerit for their inaugural Kontinental Hockey League season in 2014–15.

After four seasons in the KHL with Jokerit, Huhtala left as a free agent to sign a two-year contract with German outfit, Adler Mannheim of the DEL, on April 13, 2018.

== Career statistics ==
			Regular season					Playoffs
Season	Team	League	GP	G	A	Pts	PIM	GP	G	A	Pts	PIM
2002–03	Ilves U16	U16 SM-sarja	14	10	8	18	0	6	3	3	6	2
2003–04	Ilves U18	U18 SM-sarja	30	11	16	27	39	—	—	—	—	—
2003–04	Ilves U20	U20 SM-liiga	1	0	0	0	0	—	—	—	—	—
2004–05	Ilves U18	U18 SM-sarja	3	0	3	3	4	—	—	—	—	—
2004–05	Ilves U20	U20 SM-liiga	32	9	4	13	51	10	2	0	2	10
2005–06	Ilves U20	U20 SM-liiga	10	4	2	6	6	—	—	—	—	—
2005–06	Ilves	SM-liiga	42	2	1	3	63	3	1	0	1	2
2005–06	Suomi U20	Mestis	5	0	2	2	0	—	—	—	—	—
2006–07	Ilves U20	U20 SM-liiga	11	5	5	10	22	5	0	3	3	14
2006–07	Ilves	SM-liiga	51	2	3	5	48	7	0	0	0	0
2007–08	Porin Ässät U20	U20 SM-liiga	3	2	4	6	2	12	8	7	15	4
2007–08	Porin Ässät	SM-liiga	51	6	7	13	20	—	—	—	—	—
2008–09	Porin Ässät	SM-liiga	57	12	16	28	63	—	—	—	—	—
2009–10	Porin Ässät	SM-liiga	52	16	9	25	56	—	—	—	—	—
2010–11	Porin Ässät	SM-liiga	34	11	13	24	64	6	3	2	5	4
2011–12	Espoo Blues	SM-liiga	55	11	17	28	57	15	4	0	4	72
2012–13	Espoo Blues	SM-liiga	54	22	10	32	109	—	—	—	—	—
2013–14	Espoo Blues	Liiga	60	23	20	43	32	6	2	2	4	16
2014–15	Jokerit	KHL	55	12	5	17	31	10	5	1	6	8
2015–16	Jokerit	KHL	24	5	5	10	4	—	—	—	—	—
2016–17	Jokerit	KHL	50	15	10	25	18	4	2	0	2	4
2017–18	Jokerit	KHL	39	8	3	11	14	10	1	0	1	36
2018–19	Adler Mannheim	DEL	41	13	13	26	14	12	4	4	8	4
2019–20	Adler Mannheim	DEL	51	14	13	27	40	—	—	—	—	—
2020–21	Adler Mannheim	DEL	28	3	7	10	4	3	2	1	3	4
2021–22	HV71	HockeyAllsvenskan	48	13	14	27	26	14	4	3	7	14
2022–23	Kiekko-Espoo	Mestis	42	17	29	46	30	16	4	8	12	6
KHL totals			168	40	23	63	67	24	8	1	9	48
SM-liiga totals			456	105	96	201	512	37	10	4	14	94
DEL totals			120	30	33	63	58	15	6	5	11	8

== Awards and honours ==
Award	Year
DEL
Champion (Adler Mannheim)	2019
