= Olivier Roy (ice hockey) =

Canadian ice hockey player (born 1991)

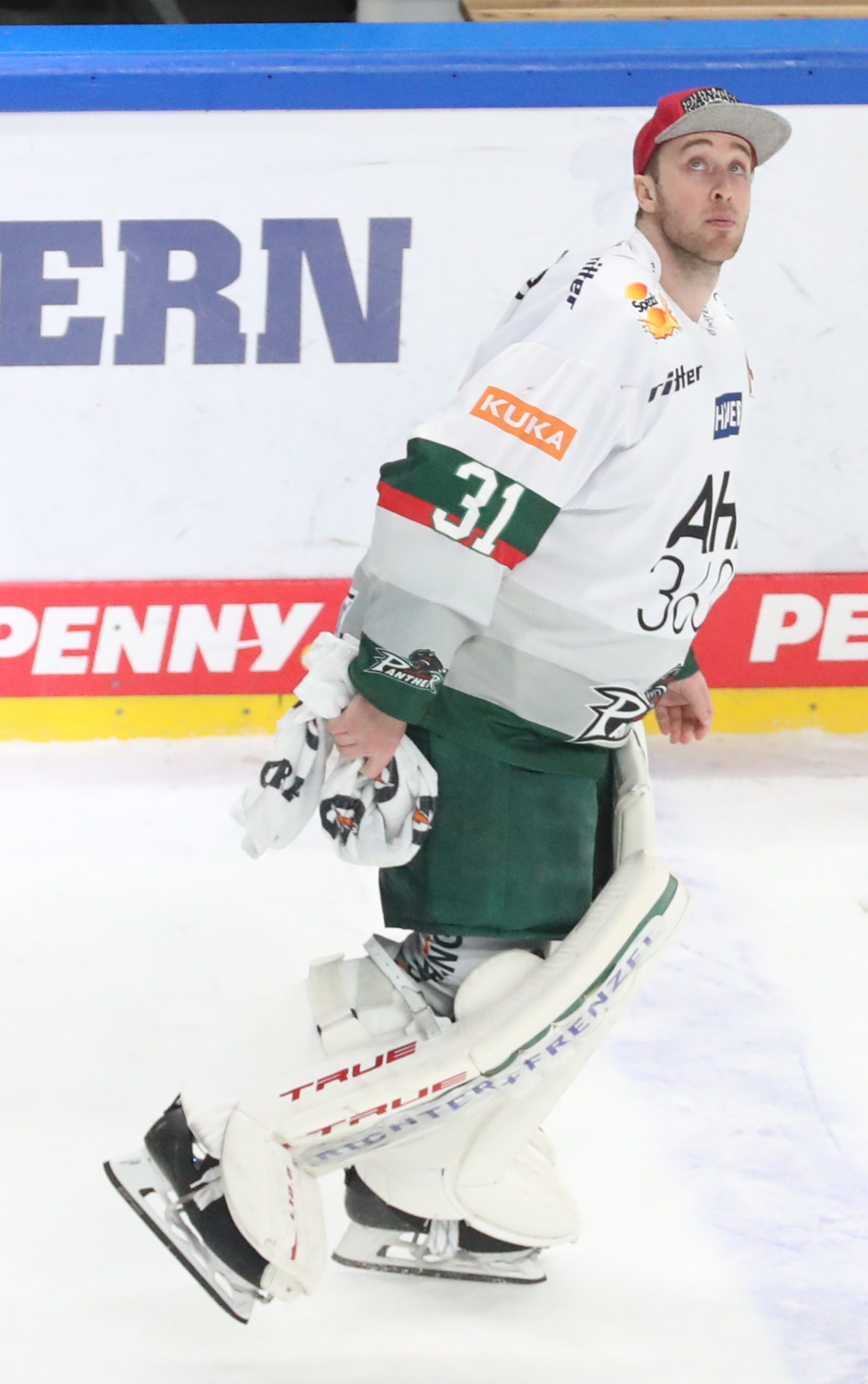
- Roy with the Augsburger Panther in 2022
- Born: July 12, 1991 (age 35) Causapscal, Quebec, Canada
- Height: 6 ft 0 in (183 cm)
- Weight: 180 lb (82 kg; 12 st 12 lb)
- Position: Goaltender
- Catches: Left
- ICEHL team Former teams: HC Pustertal Wölfe; Oklahoma City Barons; Abbotsford Heat; HDD Olimpija Ljubljana; EC VSV; Augsburger Panther; Fehérvár AV19
- NHL draft: 133rd overall, 2009; Edmonton Oilers
- Playing career: 2010–present

Olivier Bellavance-Roy (French pronunciation: [ʁwa]; born July 12, 1991) is a Canadian professional ice hockey goaltender currently playing for HC Pustertal Wölfe of the ICE Hockey League (ICEHL).

Roy was originally drafted in the fifth round, 133rd overall, in the 2009 NHL entry draft by the Edmonton Oilers. His playing style is modeled after several players, including Marc-André Fleury and Rick DiPietro. He is of no relation to former NHL goaltender and head coach Patrick Roy.

== Playing career ==
=== Amateur ===
Roy was selected in the third round, 44th overall, by the Quebec Major Junior Hockey League (QMJHL)'s Cape Breton Screaming Eagles in the 2007 QMJHL Entry Draft. In his first season with Cape Breton, Roy recorded four shutouts and ultimately won the RDS Cup as the League's top rookie.

Roy then played for Team Quebec in the 2008 ADT Canada-Russia Challenge, and was named Team Quebec's Player of the Game in their 5–3 win over Team Russia in the first game of the series.

Roy was ranked as the second-best North American goaltender available by the NHL Central Scouting Bureau going into the 2009 NHL entry draft in Montreal, and on June 27, he was selected by the Edmonton Oilers in the fifth round, 133rd overall.

Roy played for Canada at the 2011 World Junior Ice Hockey Championships, along with goaltender Mark Visentin, and started the opening game of the tournament against Russia. After three seasons with Cape Breton, Roy was traded to the Acadie-Bathurst Titan for the 2010–11 season, but struggled during the playoffs. In 2012, his rights were traded to the Baie-Comeau Drakkar.

=== Professional ===
On March 30, 2011, He signed a three-year, entry-level contract with the Edmonton Oilers. On November 8, 2013, Roy was traded by the Oilers to the Calgary Flames along with Ladislav Šmíd in exchange for Roman Horák and Laurent Brossoit.

On September 30, 2014, as a free agent and without an NHL offer, Roy signed a one-year ECHL contract with the Idaho Steelheads.

As a free agent, Roy opted to pursue a European career, and signed a one-year deal with Slovenian club, HDD Olimpija Ljubljana, a member of the Austrian Hockey League (EBEL), on July 30, 2015. After one year with Olimpija, he headed to fellow EBEL team EC VSV.

After five seasons in Germany with Augsburger, Roy left as a free agent to sign a one-year deal with Hungarian club, Fehérvár AV19 of the ICEHL, on May 13, 2022.

== Career statistics ==
=== Regular season and playoffs ===
			Regular season									Playoffs
Season	Team	League	GP	W	L	T/OT	MIN	GA	SO	GAA	SV%	GP	W	L	MIN	GA	SO	GAA	SV%
2007–08	Cape Breton Screaming Eagles	QMJHL	47	27	15	3	2428	116	4	2.87	.896	11	5	6	707	30	1	2.55	.914
2008–09	Cape Breton Screaming Eagles	QMJHL	54	35	13	3	2935	137	3	2.80	.906	11	7	4	739	30	0	2.43	.910
2009–10	Cape Breton Screaming Eagles	QMJHL	54	32	21	0	3155	138	5	2.62	.908	5	1	4	311	19	0	3.66	.877
2009–10	Springfield Falcons	AHL	3	1	1	0	140	6	0	2.57	.913	—	—	—	—	—	—	—	—
2010–11	Acadie-Bathurst Titan	QMJHL	45	29	13	2	2603	121	2	2.79	.911	3	0	2	105	12	0	6.88	.739
2011–12	Stockton Thunder	ECHL	40	16	18	5	2388	99	4	2.49	.925	8	4	4	488	20	0	2.46	.919
2011–12	Oklahoma City Barons	AHL	3	1	0	0	128	5	0	2.34	.937	—	—	—	—	—	—	—	—
2012–13	Oklahoma City Barons	AHL	22	9	9	1	1190	55	0	2.77	.902	—	—	—	—	—	—	—	—
2012–13	Stockton Thunder	ECHL	9	7	2	0	545	11	1	1.21	.961	22	12	9	1261	59	0	2.81	.911
2013–14	Oklahoma City Barons	AHL	4	2	2	0	219	12	0	3.29	.897	—	—	—	—	—	—	—	—
2013–14	Alaska Aces	ECHL	20	13	7	0	1199	42	4	2.10	.922	8	6	1	450	17	1	2.27	.896
2013–14	Abbotsford Heat	AHL	12	5	6	1	615	34	0	3.31	.902	—	—	—	—	—	—	—	—
2014–15	Idaho Steelheads	ECHL	40	25	10	3	2262	92	4	2.44	.911	5	2	3	284	15	0	3.17	.891
2015–16	HDD Olimpija Ljubljana	EBEL	42	—	—	—	2366	128	0	3.20	.918	—	—	—	—	—	—	—	—
2016–17	EC VSV	EBEL	35	—	—	—	2047	88	0	2.58	.927	—	—	—	—	—	—	—	—
2017–18	Eispiraten Crimmitschau	DEL2	21	12	—	—	1193	62	0	3.12	.921	—	—	—	—	—	—	—	—
2017–18	Augsburger Panther	DEL	23	11	12	0	1385	63	0	2.73	.917	—	—	—	—	—	—	—	—
2018–19	Augsburger Panther	DEL	36	18	15	0	2030	82	5	2.42	.917	14	7	7	923	28	1	2.00	.930
2019–20	Augsburger Panther	DEL	34	17	17	0	2005	76	2	2.27	.924	—	—	—	—	—	—	—	—
2020–21	Augsburger Panther	DEL	10	3	6	0	529	29	0	3.29	.901	—	—	—	—	—	—	—	—
2021–22	Augsburger Panther	DEL	33	13	18	0	1899	87	2	2.75	.910	—	—	—	—	—	—	—	—
AHL totals			44	18	18	2	2292	112	0	2.93	.905	—	—	—	—	—	—	—	—

Medal record

Representing Canada

Ice hockey

World Junior Championships
Silver medal – second place	2011 Buffalo	

=== International ===
Year	Team	Event	Result	GP	W	L	T	MIN	GA	SO	GAA	SV%
2011	Canada	WJC	2nd place, silver medalist(s)	3	2	1	0	185	11	0	3.57	.875
Junior totals				3	2	1	0	185	11	0	3.57	.875

== Awards and honours ==
Award	Year
QMJHL
Rookie of the Year	2008
Raymond Lagacé Trophy (Defensive Rookie of the Year)	2008
All-Rookie Team	2008
CHL All-Rookie Team	2008
CHL Top Prospects Game	2009
ECHL
Kelly Cup (Alaska Aces)	2014
All-Star Game	2015

Awards and achievements
Preceded by T. J. Brennan	Winner of the Raymond Lagacé Trophy; 2007–08	Succeeded by Dmitri Kulikov
Preceded by Jakub Voracek	Winner of the RDS Cup; 2007–08	Succeeded by Dmitri Kulikov
