= David Stieler =

Czech-German ice hockey player

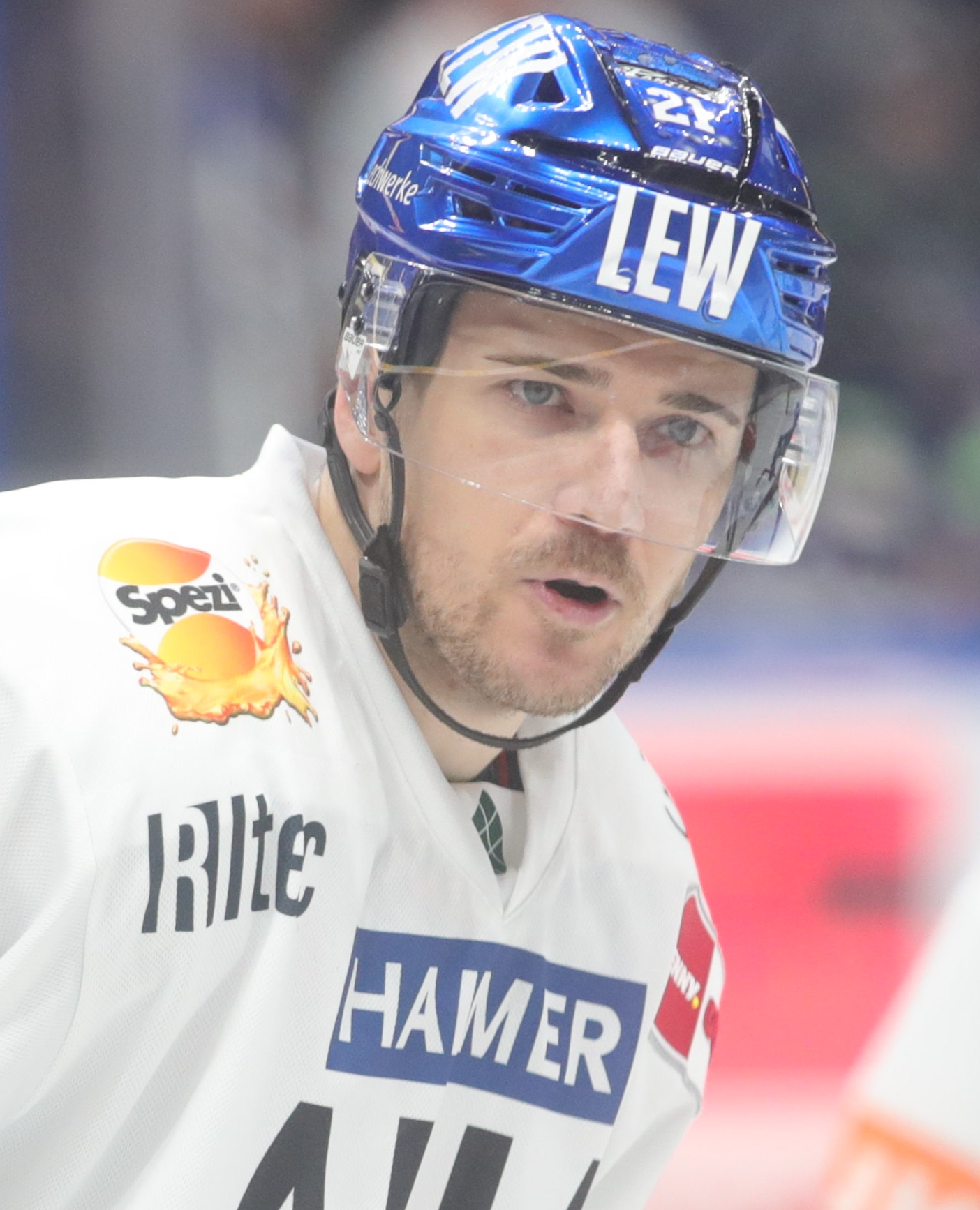
- Stieler in 2023
- Born: July 20, 1988 (age 37) Kladno, Czechoslovakia
- Height: 5 ft 11 in (180 cm)
- Weight: 179 lb (81 kg; 12 st 11 lb)
- Position: Forward
- Shoots: Left
- team Former teams: Free Agent; HC Kladno; BK Mladá Boleslav; HK 36 Skalica; Augsburger Panther
- NHL draft: Undrafted
- Playing career: 2008–present

David Stieler (born July 20, 1988) is a Czech-German professional ice hockey player, who is currently an unrestricted free agent. He most recently played with German club Augsburger Panther of the Deutsche Eishockey Liga (DEL).

Born in Czechoslovakia, he is of German origin and holds a German passport.

== Playing career ==
A product of HC Kladno, Stieler took his game to Canada in 2006, playing for the Swift Current Broncos in the WHL until 2008.

He played with HC Kladno in the Czech Extraliga during the 2010–11 Czech Extraliga season and spent the following 2011-12 campaign on loan at BK Mlada Boleslav.

From 2012 to 2014, he played for HK 36 Skalica in the Slovakian Extraliga, tallying 22 goals and 37 assists in 122 contests.

Stieler dominated the 2014–15 season in the German Oberliga Süd, scoring 46 goals and dishing out 73 assists in 43 games for EV Regensburg, while being named Player of the Year by eishockeynews.de.

He signed with German DEL2 side Fischtown Pinguins for the 2015-16 campaign and made 56 appearances for the team, scoring 27 goals while assisting on 30 others. His performances caught the eye of teams from Germany's top-tier Deutsche Eishockey Liga (DEL). In April 2016, Stieler put pen to paper on a contract with DEL side Augsburger Panther.

In his seventh season with the Augsburger Panther in 2022–23, Stieler contributed with 7 goals and 22 points through 49 regular season games; however was unable to help prevent the Panthers from finishing in a relegation position. Stieler left the club after his contract on 16 March 2023.
