= Pascal Zerressen =

German ice hockey player

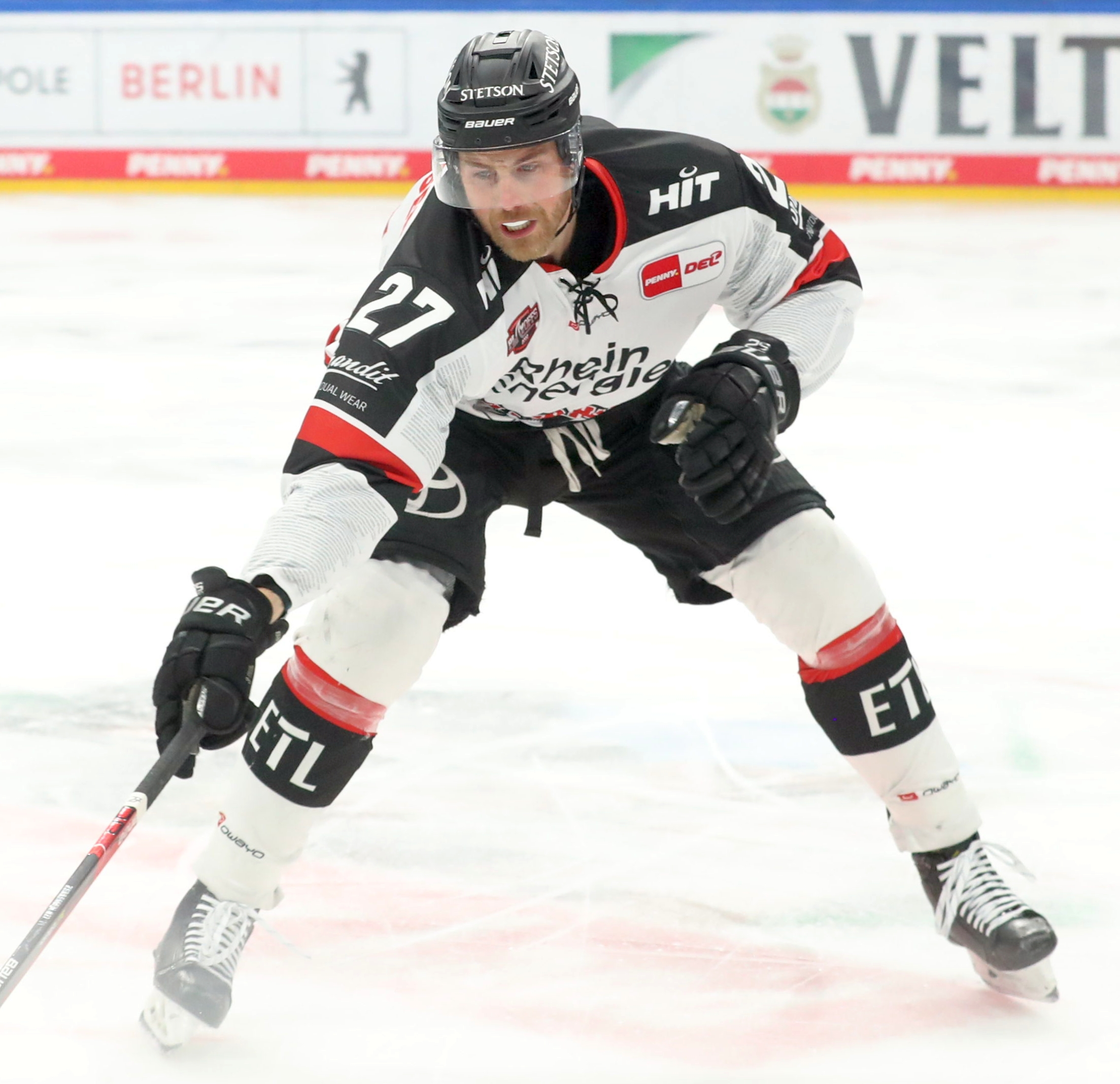
- Born: November 22, 1992 (age 32); Tönisvorst, Germany
- Height: 6 ft 5 in (196 cm)
- Weight: 214 lb (97 kg; 15 st 4 lb)
- Position: Defence
- Shoots: Left
- DEL2 team Former teams: Starbulls Rosenheim; SC Riessersee; Kölner Haie; Krefeld Pinguine; Bietigheim Steelers
- Playing career: 2010–present

Pascal Zerressen (born November 22, 1992) is a German professional ice hockey defenceman. He is currently playing for Starbulls Rosenheim in the DEL2.

Zerressen originally played with Krefeld in the Deutsche Eishockey Liga (DEL) before joining fellow German club, Kölner Haie.

He played nine seasons in Cologne, before returning on a one-year contract to Krefeld Pinguine upon their relegation to the DEL2 on 18 May 2022.

== Career statistics ==
=== International ===
Year	Team	Event	GP	G	A	Pts	PIM
2010	Germany	U18	5	1	1	2	2
2012	Germany	WJC-D1	5	0	1	1	0
Junior totals			10	1	2	3	2
