= Danny aus den Birken =

German ice hockey player (born 1985)

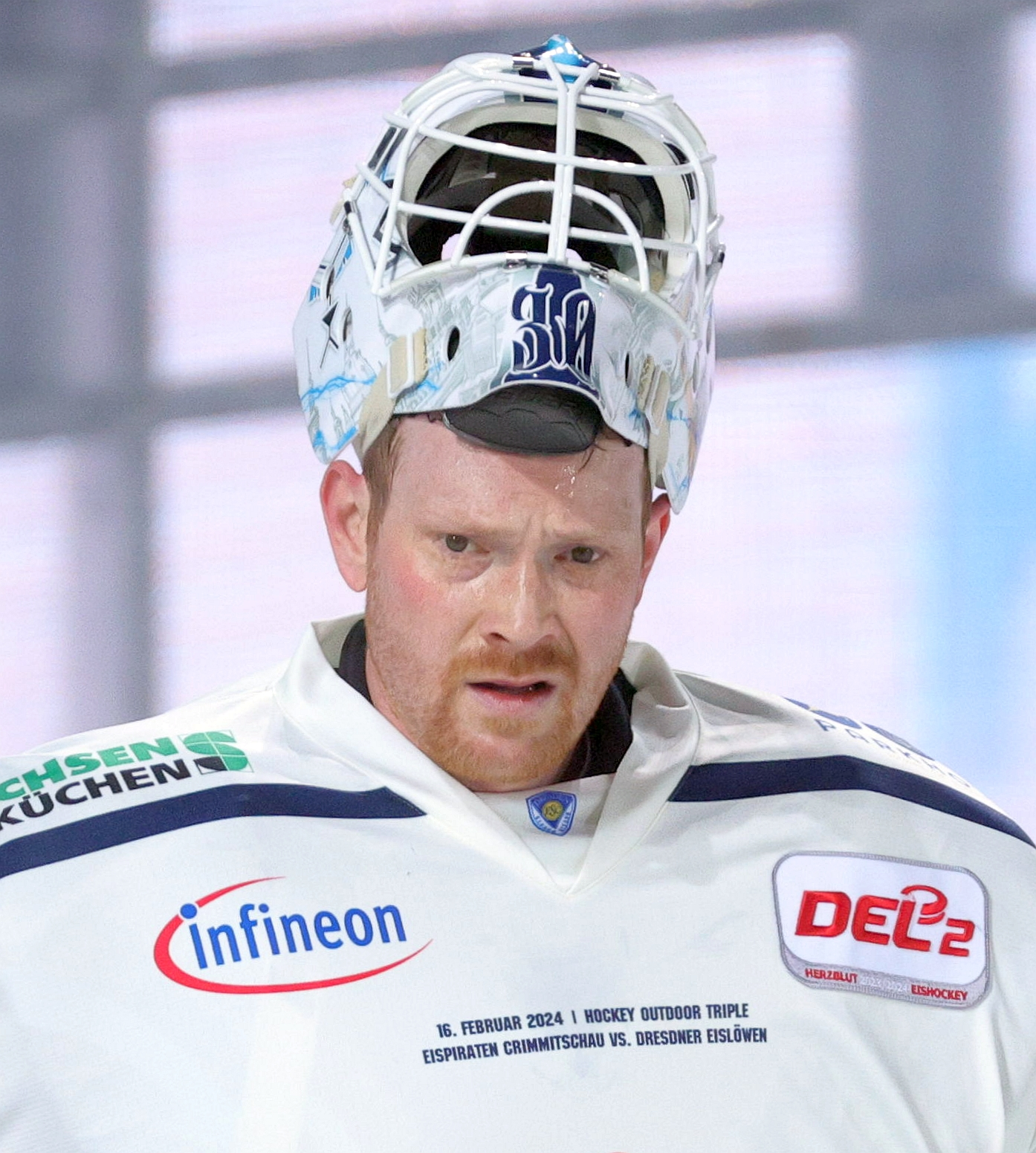
- Danny aus den Birken in 2024
- Born: 15 February 1985 (age 41) Düsseldorf, West Germany
- Height: 6 ft 1 in (185 cm)
- Weight: 196 lb (89 kg; 14 st 0 lb)
- Position: Goaltender
- Caught: Left
- Played for: Adler Mannheim; Iserlohn Roosters; Kölner Haie; EHC München
- National team: Germany
- Playing career: 2003–present

Danny aus den Birken (born 15 February 1985) is a German professional ice hockey goaltender. He most notably played in the Deutsche Eishockey Liga (DEL). now playing in the Deutsche Eishockey Liga 2 for Dresdner Eislöwen (DEL2).

== Playing career ==
He previously played with Kölner Haie for parts of five seasons before he joined EHC Red Bull München as a free agent on 10 April 2015.

aus den Birken, played eight seasons with München, collecting four DEL titles with the club before leaving at the conclusion of the 2022–23 season and ending his 20 year professional playing career.

He instantly moved into a goaltending coaching role with EC Bad Nauheim of the DEL2.

== Career statistics ==
Medal record

Representing Germany

Ice hockey

Olympic Games
Silver medal – second place	2018 Pyeongchang	

=== International ===
Year	Team	Event	GP	W	L	T	MIN	GA	SO	GAA	SV%
2014	Germany	WC	1	—	—	—	—	—	—	5.20	.861
2015	Germany	WC	1	—	—	—	—	—	—	6.76	.790
2018	Germany	OG	6	3	2	0	376	17	0	2.71	.897
Senior totals			8	—	—	—	376	17	—	6.00	.840

== Awards and honors ==
Award	Year
International
Olympic Best Goaltender	2018
