= Curt Frenzel Stadium =

Stadium in Augsburg, Germany

Coordinates: 48°22′26″N 10°53′11″E

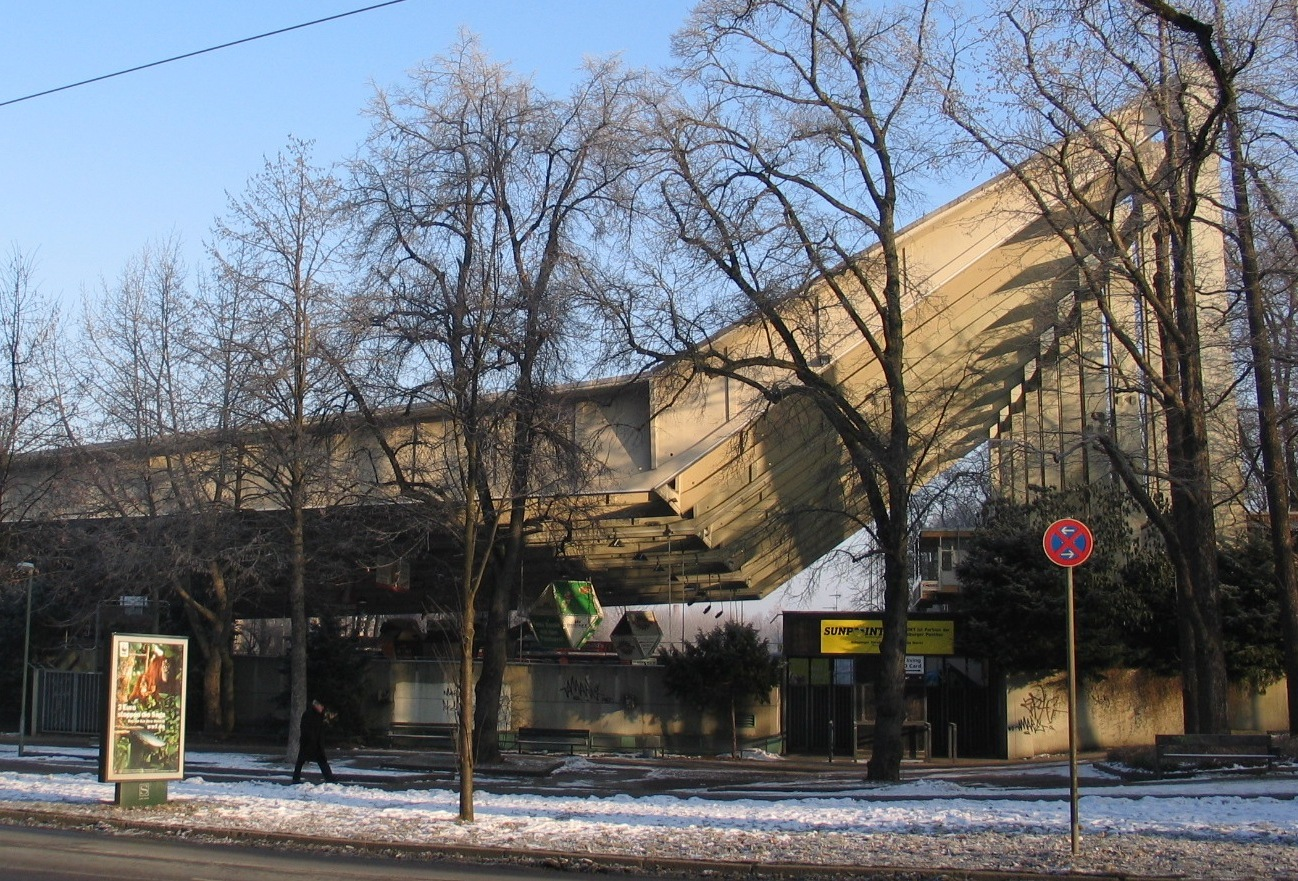

The Curt Frenzel Stadium (Curt-Frenzel-Stadion) is an arena in Augsburg, Germany. It is used for ice hockey in the German DEL as home arena for the Augsburger Panther. It holds 6,218 people. It was renamed in 1971 after Curt Frenzel, club president of the Panther, who died in 1970. Until 2013 the stadium was only covered by a roof. Not having walls, the stadium was the only in German professional ice hockey partly being an outdoor arena. Along with a complete renovation the arena was closed for the DEL season 2013/14. The renovation had begun in 2010 and was scheduled to be completed in 2012. However, after the first stand had been completed, fans discovered that they were not able to see parts of the ice. The stand had to be rebuilt, causing an estimate of 2,5 million Euro extra cost and leading to a not yet settled lawsuit against the responsible architect.
