= 2019–20 DEL season =

- League: Deutsche Eishockey Liga
- Sport: Ice hockey
- Duration: 13 September 2019 – 10 March 2020
- Games: 364
- Teams: 14

Regular season
- Season champions: EHC Red Bull München
- Top scorer: Wayne Simpson (56 points)

DEL seasons
- ← 2018–19 2020–21 →

The 2019–20 Deutsche Eishockey Liga season was the 26th season since the founding of the Deutsche Eishockey Liga running from 13 September 2019 to 10 March 2020. The season was ended prematurely due to the COVID-19 pandemic in Germany, and EHC Red Bull München, which had won the regular season, was selected by the DEL for the 2020–21 Champions Hockey League, as final regular season standings in lieu of playoffs were used to determine DEL nominations to the league.

The season saw the same 14 teams as the previous year, as all teams were given a license.

== Teams ==
Teams of the 2019–20 DEL season

Team	City	Arena	Capacity
Augsburger Panther	Augsburg	Curt Frenzel Stadium	6,218
Eisbären Berlin	Berlin	Mercedes-Benz Arena	14,200
Fischtown Pinguins	Bremerhaven	Eisarena Bremerhaven	4,674
Düsseldorfer EG	Düsseldorf	ISS Dome	13,400
ERC Ingolstadt	Ingolstadt	Saturn Arena	4,815
Iserlohn Roosters	Iserlohn	Eissporthalle Iserlohn	5,000
Kölner Haie	Cologne	Lanxess Arena	18,500
Krefeld Pinguine	Krefeld	König Palast	9,000
Adler Mannheim	Mannheim	SAP Arena	13,600
EHC Red Bull München	Munich	Olympia Eishalle	6,256
Thomas Sabo Ice Tigers	Nuremberg	Arena Nürnberger Versicherung	7,810
Schwenninger Wild Wings	Villingen-Schwenningen	Helios Arena	6,215
Straubing Tigers	Straubing	Eisstadion am Pulverturm	6,000
Grizzlys Wolfsburg	Wolfsburg	Eis Arena Wolfsburg	4,660

== Regular season ==
=== Standings ===
Pos	Team	Pld	W	OTW	OTL	L	GF	GA	GD	Pts	Qualification
1	EHC Red Bull München	52	31	5	5	11	174	128	+46	108	Playoffs
2	Adler Mannheim	52	28	6	6	12	180	132	+48	102	Playoffs
3	Straubing Tigers	52	26	8	4	14	175	136	+39	98	Playoffs
4	Eisbären Berlin	52	25	7	5	15	169	144	+25	94	Playoffs
5	Düsseldorfer EG	52	20	10	5	17	131	116	+15	85	Playoffs
6	Fischtown Pinguins	52	21	6	9	16	157	148	+9	84	Playoffs
7	ERC Ingolstadt	52	19	10	4	19	164	161	+3	81	Pre-playoffs
8	Thomas Sabo Ice Tigers	52	22	6	3	21	152	158	−6	81	Pre-playoffs
9	Grizzlys Wolfsburg	52	19	7	3	23	147	150	−3	74	Pre-playoffs
10	Augsburger Panther	52	20	2	8	22	142	152	−10	72	Pre-playoffs
11	Kölner Haie	52	16	4	9	23	124	153	−29	65	
12	Krefeld Pinguine	52	14	1	8	29	134	170	−36	52	
13	Iserlohn Roosters	52	12	5	5	30	116	163	−47	51	
14	Schwenninger Wild Wings	52	11	3	6	32	119	173	−54	45	

Source: DEL
Rules for classification: 1) points; 2) head-to-head points; 3) head-to-head goal difference; 4) head-to-head number of goals scored.

=== Results ===
==== Matches 1–26 ====
Home \ Away	AUG	BER	BRE	DÜS	ING	ISE	KÖL	KRE	MAN	MUN	NÜR	SCH	STR	WOL
Augsburger Panther	—	1–2	0–4	3–4 (SO)	2–3	1–0	5–3	3–0	4–1	1–2	5–1	3–2	4–5	1–2 (OT)
Eisbären Berlin	4–0	—	4–5 (OT)	3–1	4–5 (SO)	4–0	3–2 (OT)	6–2	5–1	3–5	6–2	2–1	5–2	4–1
Fischtown Pinguins	4–2	5–0	—	0–6	4–3	1–2 (SO)	4–3 (OT)	4–3 (OT)	4–5 (SO)	1–2	4–2	3–1	2–4	3–4 (OT)
Düsseldorfer EG	3–2	4–0	0–1	—	1–2 (SO)	4–2	1–4	2–1 (SO)	5–4 (SO)	1–2	3–0	3–2 (OT)	3–2	5–2
ERC Ingolstadt	2–1	2–4	4–3 (OT)	3–2	—	3–2	3–1	4–5	1–2	4–7	1–5	6–3	2–3	6–3
Iserlohn Roosters	5–3	3–1	5–1	2–3 (OT)	0–3	—	3–4	2–3	0–5	1–0	4–1	1–4	2–3 (SO)	1–5
Kölner Haie	1–3	3–4 (OT)	2–5	4–1	2–3 (OT)	2–3 (OT)	—	2–1	2–1 (OT)	0–3	2–3	2–1	3–4 (OT)	4–2
Krefeld Pinguine	3–4 (OT)	1–4	1–2	4–3	1–2	3–1	2–3	—	1–4	5–8	4–5	3–0	3–4 (SO)	2–3
Adler Mannheim	8–3	4–1	3–0	5–3	4–1	5–7	1–2 (OT)	3–6	—	2–7	2–0	3–0	4–3	5–2
EHC Red Bull München	6–0	4–2	1–0	3–2	5–4 (OT)	5–2	3–1	2–1	2–3 (OT)	—	4–1	2–1 (SO)	3–1	3–2
Thomas Sabo Ice Tigers	5–4 (SO)	2–3 (SO)	6–2	3–0	1–3	2–1 (OT)	4–0	4–2	1–4	1–5	—	4–1	3–2	2–4
Schwenninger Wild Wings	3–4 (SO)	5–4	3–2 (OT)	2–3 (SO)	4–10	4–1	4–5	5–2	6–1	2–4	3–5	—	2–0	0–4
Straubing Tigers	7–3	5–3	5–4 (SO)	2–3	4–1	5–0	6–2	4–3 (OT)	3–1	5–1	5–2	5–0	—	5–3
Grizzlys Wolfsburg	2–3	5–6 (OT)	2–5	2–3	2–0	3–2 (SO)	1–2	3–2	1–3	3–5	2–4	5–3	1–3	—

Source: DEL
Legend: Blue = home team win; Yellow = draw; Red = away team win.

==== Matches 27–52 ====
Home \ Away	AUG	BER	BRE	DÜS	ING	ISE	KÖL	KRE	MAN	MUN	NÜR	SCH	STR	WOL
Augsburger Panther	—	3–5	3–4 (OT)	2–0	3–4 (OT)	4–1	4–1	2–1	4–2	5–2	6–3	3–1	4–2	2–4
Eisbären Berlin	3–2	—	4–3	1–2 (OT)	6–2	4–2	4–5 (OT)	1–5	4–3 (OT)	4–3	2–0	5–1	1–2	5–6 (SO)
Fischtown Pinguins	2–6	2–3	—	3–2	4–2	3–2	2–1 (OT)	4–1	3–4 (SO)	4–6	5–1	4–1	5–4 (SO)	3–4
Düsseldorfer EG	1–0	2–1	3–2 (OT)	—	6–5	5–1	4–1	3–2 (OT)	1–3	2–3	2–3 (SO)	2–3 (OT)	1–4	2–1 (SO)
ERC Ingolstadt	3–2 (SO)	1–4	4–3	3–2 (OT)	—	2–1 (OT)	2–1	1–4	4–3 (OT)	6–4	3–4 (SO)	4–3	2–4	5–3
Iserlohn Roosters	1–6	5–2	4–3	0–1	2–3	—	2–3	2–4	1–4	2–4	5–4 (OT)	3–1	5–2	2–3
Kölner Haie	2–3	5–3	1–5	1–2	2–3 (SO)	4–1	—	1–3	4–5 (SO)	1–2	3–5	4–2	4–1	5–0
Krefeld Pinguine	7–4	0–2	2–3	3–4	4–1	3–4 (SO)	8–2	—	1–6	1–4	3–4	3–2 (OT)	3–4 (OT)	1–5
Adler Mannheim	4–0	7–3	7–2	2–6	4–3 (SO)	2–0	4–3	3–0	—	1–2	5–1	4–2	2–1 (OT)	3–2
EHC Red Bull München	5–4 (OT)	2–3 (SO)	2–1	2–3	2–3 (OT)	7–5	4–1	6–1	2–4	—	2–3 (OT)	3–2 (OT)	3–6	4–5 (SO)
Thomas Sabo Ice Tigers	5–2	5–3	1–3	3–2 (OT)	4–1	4–5 (OT)	6–3	1–0	2–7	2–1	—	5–2	2–3	3–5
Schwenninger Wild Wings	5–1	5–3	4–6	1–2	2–4	2–3	1–0	4–6	2–1	2–0	4–6	—	3–2 (OT)	3–2
Straubing Tigers	3–2	1–2	1–4	2–1	7–6	1–4	3–2 (OT)	5–3	5–4 (SO)	2–3 (OT)	2–1	5–1	—	5–1
Grizzlys Wolfsburg	1–0 (OT)	1–2 (OT)	2–1 (SO)	4–1	1–7	4–1	1–4	5–1	4–2	5–1	2–4	3–0	4–1	—

Source: DEL
Legend: Blue = home team win; Yellow = draw; Red = away team win.

== Playoffs ==
The playoffs were cancelled as a result of the COVID-19 pandemic in Germany.

== Statistics ==
=== Scoring leaders ===
List shows the top skaters sorted by points, then goals.

Player	GP	G	A	Pts	+/−	PIM	POS
Wayne Simpson	52	21	35	56	+4	20	F
Chad Costello	52	20	34	54	−1	28	F
Borna Rendulić	50	27	22	49	+24	51	F
Marcel Noebels	52	23	26	49	+14	16	F
Daniel Pietta	51	18	31	49	+2	28	F
Drew LeBlanc	42	11	38	49	+8	8	F
Jan Urbas	50	27	21	48	+13	20	F
Daniel Fischbuch	52	19	29	48	+2	24	F
Mark Voakes	47	12	36	48	+18	30	F
Chris Bourque	51	17	30	47	+26	34	F

=== Leading goaltenders ===
Only the top five goaltenders, based on save percentage, who have played at least 40% of their team's minutes, are included in this list.

Player	TOI	GA	GAA	SA	Sv%	SO
Mathias Niederberger	2747	94	2.05	1347	93.0	5
Oskar Östlund	659	31	2.82	432	92.8	0
Danny aus den Birken	1168	43	2.21	591	92.7	1
Andreas Jenike	1532	73	2.86	980	92.6	0
Olivier Roy	2005	76	2.27	1008	92.5	2
