= 2013–14 DEL season =

- League: Deutsche Eishockey Liga
- Sport: Ice Hockey
- Games: 364
- Teams: 14
- Total attendance: 2,308,736 (6,343 per game)

Regular season
- Season champions: Hamburg Freezers
- Top scorer: (Canada) Adam Courchaine (Krefeld Pinguine) (74 points)

Finals
- Champions: ERC Ingolstadt
- Runners-up: Kölner Haie

DEL seasons
- ← 2012–13 2014–15 →

The 2013–14 Deutsche Eishockey Liga season was the 20th season since the founding of the Deutsche Eishockey Liga.

== Teams ==
Teams of the 2013–14 DEL season

Team	City	Arena
Augsburger Panther	Augsburg	Curt Frenzel Stadium
Eisbären Berlin	Berlin	O2 World
DEG Metro Stars	Düsseldorf	ISS Dome
Hamburg Freezers	Hamburg	Color Line Arena
ERC Ingolstadt	Ingolstadt	Saturn Arena
Iserlohn Roosters	Iserlohn	Eissporthalle Iserlohn
Kölner Haie	Cologne	Lanxess Arena
Krefeld Pinguine	Krefeld	König Palast
Adler Mannheim	Mannheim	SAP Arena
Red Bull München	Munich	Olympia Eishalle
Thomas Sabo Ice Tigers	Nuremberg	Nuremberg Arena
Schwenninger Wild Wings	Villingen-Schwenningen	Helios Arena
Straubing Tigers	Straubing	Eisstadion am Pulverturm
Grizzly Adams Wolfsburg	Wolfsburg	Eisarena Wolfsburg

== Regular season ==
	Team	GP	W	OTW	SOW	OTL	SOL	L	Goals	Points
1	Hamburg Freezers	52	30	3	0	5	1	13	162:116	102
2	Krefeld Pinguine	52	29	1	2	2	0	18	169:136	95
3	Thomas Sabo Ice Tigers	52	24	2	4	3	4	15	182:152	91
4	Adler Mannheim	52	26	1	3	2	2	18	148:123	90
5	Kölner Haie	52	23	2	5	3	3	16	147:118	89
6	EHC Wolfsburg	52	25	4	1	2	1	19	151:125	88
7	EHC München	52	21	3	4	1	3	20	167:155	81
8	Eisbären Berlin	52	20	3	5	0	4	20	152:152	80
9	ERC Ingolstadt	52	21	3	0	4	2	22	138:149	75
10	Iserlohn Roosters	52	19	4	2	2	3	22	147:149	74
11	Augsburger Panther	52	18	2	3	1	4	24	147:179	69
12	Straubing Tigers	52	17	2	1	3	6	23	136:153	63
13	Schwenninger Wild Wings	52	12	0	5	2	3	30	136:190	51
14	Düsseldorfer EG	52	10	1	3	1	2	35	101:186	41

GP = Games Played, W = Wins, OTW = Overtime win, SOW = Shootout win, OTL = Overtime loss, SOL = Shootout loss, L = Loss
Color code: = Direct Playoff qualification, = Playoff qualification round, = No playoff qualification

== Playoffs ==
=== Playoff qualification ===
The playoff qualification was played between 9–14 March 2014 in a best-of-three mode.

			1	2	3
EHC München	1–2	Iserlohn Roosters	5–3	2–3	1–4
Eisbären Berlin	1–2	ERC Ingolstadt	1–0	1–4	2–3 (OT)

==== EHC München vs. Iserlohn Roosters ====
9 March 2014; 14:30	EHC München	5–3 (2–1, 1–1, 2–1)	Iserlohn Roosters	Olympia Eishalle, Munich; Attendance: 3,125

Game reference

Mika Noronen
Goalies
Erik Ersberg
Referees:
Daniel Piechaczek
Georg Jablukov
Linesmen:
Dominic Erdle
Thorsten Lajoie

D. Richmond (R. Duncan) – 00:45	1–0
	1–1	02:46 – B. Macek (B. Raedeke, C. Connolly)
D. Haydar (J. Urbas, F. Petermann) – 03:57	2–1
	2–2	24:24 – C. Danielsmeier (R. Raymond, T. Mulock)
J. Urbas (A. Barta, D. Haydar) (PP) – 31:22	3–2
D. Richmond (R. Duncan, N. Palmieri) – 47:34	4–2
	4–3	49:38 – B. Macek (L. Kopitz)
A. Barta (J. Urbas) (ENG) – 59:59	5–3

0 min
Penalties
10 min
43
Shots
23

12 March 2014; 19:30	Iserlohn Roosters	3–2 (2–0, 0–0, 1–2)	EHC München	Eissporthalle Iserlohn, Iserlohn; Attendance: 4,997

Game reference

Erik Ersberg
Goalies
Mika Noronen
Referees:
Daniel Piechaczek
Georg Jablukov
Linesmen:
Thomas Gemeinhardt
André Schrader

M. Wolf – 03:28	1–0
R. Raymond (B. Raedeke, A. Foster) (PP) – 06:50	2–0
C. Teubert (J. Giuliano, L. Kopitz) – 50:59	3–0
	3–1	54:07 – N. Palmieri (G. Lewis, R. Duncan)
	3–2	54:32 – F. Carciola (D. Bois, D. Richmond)

10 min
Penalties
28 min
49
Shots
29

14 March 2014; 19:30	EHC München	1–4 (1–0, 0–1, 0–3)	Iserlohn Roosters	Olympia Eishalle, Munich; Attendance: 5,133

Game reference

Mika Noronen
Goalies
Mathias Lange
Referees:
Georg Jablukov
Daniel Piechaczek
Linesmen:
Andreas Flad
Martin Holzer

N. Palmieri (D. Sparre, G. Lewis) – 01:37	1–0
	1–1	31:35 – B. Macek (M. Brennan)
	1–2	42:45 – J. Giuliano (C. Teubert, A. Foster)
	1–3	46:56 – B. Dupont
	1–4	55:19 – B. Macek (D. Orendorz)

33 min
Penalties
14 min
48
Shots
34

==== Eisbären Berlin vs. ERC Ingolstadt ====
10 March 2014; 19:30	Eisbären Berlin	1–0 (0–0, 1–0, 0–0)	ERC Ingolstadt	O2 World, Berlin; Attendance: 11,400

Game reference
Rob Zepp	Goalies	Timo Pielmeier	Referees: Marcus Brill; Lars Brüggemann; Linesmen: Marcus Höfer; Sirko Hunnius
A. Rankel (T. J. Mulock, C. Braun) (PP) – 39:54 / 1–0			Referees: Marcus Brill; Lars Brüggemann; Linesmen: Marcus Höfer; Sirko Hunnius
8 min	Penalties	8 min	Referees: Marcus Brill; Lars Brüggemann; Linesmen: Marcus Höfer; Sirko Hunnius
28	Shots	28	Referees: Marcus Brill; Lars Brüggemann; Linesmen: Marcus Höfer; Sirko Hunnius

12 March 2014; 19:30	ERC Ingolstadt	4–1 (2–1, 1–0, 1–0)	Eisbären Berlin	Saturn Arena, Ingolstadt; Attendance: 2,880

Game reference

Timo Pielmeier
Goalies
Rob Zepp
Referees:
Marcus Brill
Lars Brüggemann
Linesmen:
Benjamin Hoppe
Christoffe Hurtik

	0–1	16:33 – M. Christensen (T. J. Mulock, J. Sharrow) (EA)
Ž. Jeglič (T. Greilinger, T. Conboy) – 18:30	1–1
J. Laliberte (T. Turnbull, T. Conboy) – 19:02	2–1
M. Périard (J. Laliberte, D. Hahn) – 20:30	3–1
T. Turnbull (J. Laliberte) (ENG) – 59:52	4–1

10 min
Penalties
2 min
26
Shots
33

14 March 2014; 19:30	Eisbären Berlin	2–3 OT (2–1, 0–0, 0–1) (OT 0–1)	ERC Ingolstadt	O2 World, Berlin; Attendance: 11,700

Game reference

Rob Zepp
Goalies
Timo Pielmeier
Referees:
Stephan Bauer
Lars Brüggemann
Linesmen:
Sirko Hunnius
Marcus Höfer

F. Busch (J. Sharrow) – 10:35	1–0
	1–1	14:25 – C. Gawlik (B. Schopper, B. Barta)
H. Haase – 16:41	2–1
	2–2	54:14 – T. Hambly (R. Sabolič, Ž. Jeglič)
	2–3	67:16 – B. Schopper (Ž. Jeglič)

14 min
Penalties
18 min
33
Shots
38

=== Bracket ===
There was a reseeding after the first round.

Quarterfinals
1	Hamburg Freezers	4
10	Iserlohn Roosters	2
3	Thomas Sabo Ice Tigers	2
6	EHC Wolfsburg	4
(Pairings are reseeded after the first round)
4	Adler Mannheim	1
5	Kölner Haie	4
9	ERC Ingolstadt	4
2	Krefeld Pinguine	1

Semifinals
1	Hamburg Freezers	2
9	ERC Ingolstadt	4
5	Kölner Haie	4
6	EHC Wolfsburg	1

Final
9	ERC Ingolstadt	4
5	Kölner Haie	3

==== Quarterfinals ====
The quarterfinals were played between 16 and 28 March 2014 in a Best-of-seven mode.

===== Hamburg Freezers vs. Iserlohn Roosters =====
16 March 2014; 14:30	Hamburg Freezers	4–1 (2–0, 1–0, 1–1)	Iserlohn Roosters	O_{2} World, Hamburg; Attendance: 10,117

Game reference

Sébastien Caron
Goalies
Mathias Lange
Referees:
Roland Aumüller
Markus Schütz
Linesmen:
Seedo Janssen
Mikolaj Ponomarjow

T. Oppenheimer (J. Jakobsen, N. Krämmer) – 01:15	1–0
G. Festerling (J. Flaake, D. Wolf) – 05:20	2–0
D. Wolf (G. Festerling, T. Oppenheimer) – 39:29	3–0
D. Wolf (J. Flaake, M. Roy) (PP) – 44:31	4–0
	4–1	58:23 – T. Gödtel (B. Dupont, T. Mulock)

10 min
Penalties
12 min
38
Shots
26

19 March 2014; 19:30	Iserlohn Roosters	3–0 (2–0, 0–0, 1–0)	Hamburg Freezers	Eissporthalle Iserlohn, Iserlohn; Attendance: 4,997

Game reference

Mathias Lange
Goalies
Sébastien Caron
Referees:
Stephan Bauer
Willi Schimm
Linesmen:
Eugen Berger
Thomas Gemeinhardt

J. Giuliano (A. Foster) (PP) – 03:11	1–0
C. Hommel (T. Gödtel, C. Danielsmeier) – 18:10	2–0
B. Macek (T. Mulock, M. Lange) – 56:54	3–0

4 min
Penalties
24 min
36
Shots
40

21 March 2014; 19:30	Hamburg Freezers	3–4 (0–1, 2–2, 1–1)	Iserlohn Roosters	O_{2} World, Hamburg; Attendance: 12,800

Game reference

Sébastien Caron
Goalies
Mathias Lange
Referees:
Daniel Piechaczek
Gordon Schukies
Linesmen:
Marcus Höfer
Sirko Hunnius

	0–1	03:58 – A. Foster (D. Frosch, J. Giuliano)
D. Wolf (J. Flaake, M. Roy) – 20:11	1–1
	1–2	34:56 – M. Sertich (B. Dupont)
G. Festerling (J. Flaake, D. Wolf) – 35:43	2–2
	2–3	36:08 – B. Dupont (M. Sertich, M. Wolf)
	2–4	46:12 – B. Raedeke (R. Raymond, T. Mulock)
D. Wolf (K. Schmidt, J. Flaake) – 58:31	3–4

4 min
Penalties
2 min
47
Shots
29

23 March 2014; 14:30	Iserlohn Roosters	0–4 (0–1, 0–1, 0–2)	Hamburg Freezers	Eissporthalle Iserlohn, Iserlohn; Attendance: 4,997

Game reference

Erik Ersberg
Goalies
Dimitrij Kotschnew
Referees:
Roland Aumüller
Markus Schütz
Linesmen:
Andreas Kowert
Robert Schelewski

0–1	11:20 – J. Jakobsen (M. Madsen, C. Schubert)
0–2	21:09 – P. Dupuis (T. Oppenheimer, C. Schubert)
0–3	52:37 – G. Festerling (J. Flaake)
0–4	59:40 – D. Westcott (J. Jakobsen)

28 min
Penalties
35 min
25
Shots
30

25 March 2014; 19:30	Hamburg Freezers	3–1 (0–0, 1–1, 2–0)	Iserlohn Roosters	O_{2} World, Hamburg; Attendance: 7,104

Game reference

Dimitrij Kotschnew
Goalies
Erik Ersberg
Referees:
Stephan Bauer
Willi Schimm
Linesmen:
Marcus Höfer
Sirko Hunnius

P. Dupuis (M. Pettinger, T. Oppenheimer) – 24:46	1–0
	1–1	30:26 – B. Raedeke (T. Mulock, B. Macek)
M. Roy (D. Wolf, K. Schmidt) – 55:23	2–1
M. Pettinger (J. Jakobsen, A. Mitchell) (ENG) – 59:58	3–1

8 min
Penalties
10 min
48
Shots
24

28 March 2014; 19:30	Iserlohn Roosters	0–1 (0–0, 0–1, 0–0)	Hamburg Freezers	Eissporthalle Iserlohn, Iserlohn; Attendance: 4,997

Game reference
Mathias Lange	Goalies	Dimitrij Kotschnew	Referees: Daniel Piechaczek; Gordon Schukies; Linesmen: Eugen Berger; Thomas Gemeinhardt
0–1 / 24:34 – J. Flaake (D. Wolf)			Referees: Daniel Piechaczek; Gordon Schukies; Linesmen: Eugen Berger; Thomas Gemeinhardt
0 min	Penalties	2 min	Referees: Daniel Piechaczek; Gordon Schukies; Linesmen: Eugen Berger; Thomas Gemeinhardt
36	Shots	25	Referees: Daniel Piechaczek; Gordon Schukies; Linesmen: Eugen Berger; Thomas Gemeinhardt

Hamburg won the series 4–2.

===== Thomas Sabo Ice Tigers vs. EHC Wolfsburg =====
16 March 2014; 14:30	Thomas Sabo Ice Tigers	1–4 (0–2, 0–1, 1–1)	EHC Wolfsburg	Nuremberg Arena, Nuremberg; Attendance: 5,939

Game reference

Andreas Jenike
Goalies
Sebastian Vogl
Referees:
Marcus Brill
Daniel Piechaczek
Linesmen:
Andreas Flad
Martin Holzer

	0–1	08:59 – S. Furchner (T. Haskins, N. Milley) (PP)
	0–2	09:37 – C. Bassen (A. Brocklehurst, P. Pohl)
	0–3	27:25 – N.Milley (M. Rosa, C. Hoehenleitner)
F. Eriksson – 57:52	1–3
	1–4	59:14 – S. Furchner (T. Haskins, S. Vogl) (ENG)

10 min
Penalties
12 min
29
Shots
19

19 March 2014; 19:30	EHC Wolfsburg	4–0 (3–0, 1–0, 0–0)	Thomas Sabo Ice Tigers	Eisarena Wolfsburg, Wolfsburg; Attendance: 2,163

Game reference

Sebastian Vogl
Goalies
Andreas Jenike
Referees:
Georg Jablukov
Markus Schütz
Linesmen:
Seedo Janssen
Nikolaj Ponomarjow

T. Haskins (S. Furchner) (PP) – 07:27	1–0
S. Furchner (R. Bina, B. Kohl) (PP) – 17:04	2–0
M. Rosa (T. Haskins, S. Furchner) – 19:48	3–0
R. Abid (M. Dzieduszycki, M. Rosa) – 28:32	4–0

14 min
Penalties
20 min
31
Shots
29

21 March 2014; 19:30	Thomas Sabo Ice Tigers	5–2 (0–0, 1–0, 4–2)	EHC Wolfsburg	Nuremberg Arena, Nuremberg; Attendance: 6,797

Game reference

Tyler Weiman
Goalies
Sebastian Vogl
Referees:
Willi Schimm
Lars Brüggemann
Linesmen:
Benjamin Hoppe
Christoffer Hurtik

Y. Ehliz (S. Reinprecht, F. Eriksson) (PP) – 08:25	1–0
P. Reimer (S. Reinprecht) – 23:38	2–0
L. Pföderl (J. Pollock) – 25:38	3–0
	3–1	47:24 – A. Polaczek (T. Haskins, N. Milley)
	3–2	48:24 – M. Rosa (V. Mayer, S. Furchner)
E. Kaufmann – 51:37	4–2
P. Reimer (Y. Ehliz, S. Reinprecht) (ENG) – 59:05	5–2

6 min
Penalties
10 min
38
Shots
20

23 March 2014; 14:30	EHC Wolfsburg	5–4 OT2 (1–1, 2–1, 1–2) (OT 0–0, 1–0)	Thomas Sabo Ice Tigers	Eisarena Wolfsburg, Wolfsburg; Attendance: 3,415

Game reference

Sebastian Vogl
Goalies
Tyler Weiman
Referees:
Marcus Brill
Daniel Piechaczek
Linesmen:
Marcus Höfer
Sirko Hunnius

R. Abid (C. Bassen) – 13:16	1–0
	1–1	14:51 – M. Hussey
P. Pohl (M. Rosa, R. Abid) (PP) – 25:41	2–1
T. Haskins (B. Kohl, C. Bassen) – 27:49	3–1
	3–2	38:32 – E. Kaufmann (C. James, L. Pföderl)
J. Likens (S. Danner, A. Wurm) – 41:50	4–2
	4–3	49:43 – F. Eriksson (P. Reimer, S. Regier)
	4–4	56:15 – M. Pfleger (J. Jaspers, F. Eriksson)
N. Milley (S. Furchner) – 89:36	5–4

6 min
Penalties
4 min
32
Shots
38

25 March 2014; 19:30	Thomas Sabo Ice Tigers	6–2 (1–1, 4–1, 1–0)	EHC Wolfsburg	Nuremberg Arena, Nuremberg; Attendance: 5,064

Game reference

Tyler Weiman
Goalies
Daniar Zhunusov
Referees:
Georg Jablukov
Marian Rohatsch
Linesmen:
Andreas Flad
Martin Holzer

	0–1	05:11 – R. Abid (B. Kohl)
C. James (J. Jaspers, L. Pföderl) – 06:21	1–1
L. Pföderl (C. James, J. Jaspers) – 26:08	2–1
J. Pollock (S. Regier, E. Kaufmann) (PP) – 29:11	3–1
E. Kaufmann (S. Regier, J. Pollock) (PP) – 31:20	4–1
	4–2	32:10 – M. Rosa (K. Keller, R. Abid)
E. Kaufmann (P. Buzas) – 54:00	5–2
J. Jaspers (S. Regier, C. James) (PP) – 56:37	6–2

6 min
Penalties
14 min
27
Shots
26

28 March 2014; 19:30	EHC Wolfsburg	8–3 (3–2, 2–1, 3–0)	Thomas Sabo Ice Tigers	Eisarena Wolfsburg, Wolfsburg; Attendance: 3,354

Game reference

Sebastian Vogl
Goalies
Tyler Weiman
Referees:
Lars Brüggemann
Willi Schimm
Linesmen:
Seedo Janssen
Nikolaj Ponomarjow

N. Milley (B. Palin, T. Haskins) – 02:40	1–0
	1–1	08:16 – P. Reimer (J. Pollock)
	1–2	10:53 – Y. Stastny (S. Reinprecht) (PP)
S. Furchner (T. Haskins, N. Milley) – 16:08	2–2
S. Danner (B. Kohl, C. Höhenleitner) – 16:30	3–2
	3–3	23:19 – F. Eriksson (J. Jaspers)
R. Bina (A. Wurm, C. Höhenleitner) – 29:51	4–3
M. Rosa (M. Dzieduszycki, A. Brocklehurst) (PP2) – 33:44	5–3
T. Haskins (S. Furchner, S. Vogl) – 46:09	6–3
G. Fauser (R. Abid, M. Dzieduszycki) – 53:00	7–3
M. Dzieduszycki (R. Abid, M. Rosa) – 54:13	8–3

18 min
Penalties
24 min
35
Shots
26

Wolfsburg won the series 4–2.

===== Adler Mannheim vs. Kölner Haie =====
16 March 2014; 14:30	Adler Mannheim	0–1 (0–0, 0–1, 0–0)	Kölner Haie	SAP Arena, Mannheim; Attendance: 12,934

Game reference
Dennis Endras	Goalies	Danny aus den Birken	Referees: Stephan Bauer; Lars Brüggemann; Linesmen: Benjamin Hoppe; Christoffer Hurtik
0–1 / 27:24 – P. Gogulla (R. Collins, J. Tripp)			Referees: Stephan Bauer; Lars Brüggemann; Linesmen: Benjamin Hoppe; Christoffer Hurtik
4 min	Penalties	4 min	Referees: Stephan Bauer; Lars Brüggemann; Linesmen: Benjamin Hoppe; Christoffer Hurtik
40	Shots	25	Referees: Stephan Bauer; Lars Brüggemann; Linesmen: Benjamin Hoppe; Christoffer Hurtik

19 March 2014; 19:30	Kölner Haie	3–2 OT (0–0, 2–1, 0–1) (OT 1–0)	Adler Mannheim	Lanxess Arena, Cologne; Attendance: 13,114

Game reference

Danny aus den Birken
Goalies
Dennis Endras
Referees:
Daniel Piechaczek
Florian Zehetleitner
Linesmen:
Andreas Kowert
Robert Schelewski

	0–1	27:05 – K. Hospelt (J. Sifers, S. Wagner) (PP)
A. Falk (R. Collins, M. Mueller) (PP) – 35:11	1–1
R. Collins (P. Gogulla, M. Hannula) – 38:12	2–1
	2–2	54:18 – K. Hospelt (C. Fischer, K. Magowan)
A. Falk (R. Tičar, M. Mueller) – 78:49	3–2

4 min
Penalties
8 min
47
Shots
42

21 March 2014; 19:30	Adler Mannheim	2–1 OT2 (0–1, 1–0, 0–0) (OT 0–0, 1–0)	Kölner Haie	SAP Arena, Mannheim; Attendance: 13,600

Game reference

Felix Brueckmann
Dennis Endras
Goalies
Danny aus den Birken
Referees:
Roland Aumüller
Georg Jablukov
Linesmen:
Andreas Flad
Martin Holzer

	0–1	00:47 – C. Minard (M. Hannula, C. Stephens)
J. Sifers (S. Gamache, R. Arendt) – 31:05	1–1
S. Gamache (J. Rheault, D. Reul) – 81:39	2–1

8 min
Penalties
8 min
49
Shots
51

23 March 2014; 14:30	Kölner Haie	2–1 (0–0, 2–1, 0–0)	Adler Mannheim	Lanxess Arena, Cologne; Attendance: 18,032

Game reference

Danny aus den Birken
Goalies
Dennis Endras
Referees:
Stephan Bauer
Lars Brüggemann
Linesmen:
Eugen Berger
Thomas Gemeinhardt

M. Ohmann (R. Collins) – 23:00	1–0
	1–1	26:55 – K. Hospelt (C. Fischer, J. Hecht)
C. Minard (R. Collins, A. Falk) (PP) – 34:50	2–1

8 min
Penalties
6 min
45
Shots
31

26 March 2014; 19:30	Adler Mannheim	1–2 (1–1, 0–1, 0–0)	Kölner Haie	SAP Arena, Mannheim; Attendance: 12,005

Game reference

Dennis Endras
Goalies
Danny aus den Birken
Referees:
Daniel Piechaczek
Florian Zehetleitner
Linesmen:
Benjamin Hoppe
Christoffer Hurtik

R. Arendt (S. Gamache, J. Rheault) – 01:21	1–0
	1–1	06:29 – J. Tripp (M. Mueller)
	1–2	36:25 – A. Falk (M. Mueller, B. Krupp)

2 min
Penalties
6 min
39
Shots
36

Köln won the series 4–1.

===== Krefeld Pinguine vs. ERC Ingolstadt =====
16 March 2014; 14:30	Krefeld Pinguine	5–0 (2–0, 3–0, 0–0)	ERC Ingolstadt	König Palast, Krefeld; Attendance: 7,581

Game reference

Tomáš Duba
Goalies
Timo Pielmeier
Markus Janka
Referees:
Georg Jablukov
Marian Rohatsch
Linesmen:
Andreas Kowert
Robert Schelewski

D. Fischer (J. Meyers, K. Clark) (PP) – 09:19	1–0
C. Kretschmann (S. Akdag, B. Blank) – 10:20	2–0
A. Courchaine (K. Clark, N. St. Pierre) – 20:15	3–0
M. Schymainski (F. Méthot, N. St. Pierre) – 22:52	4–0
H. Vasiļjevs (M. Robar, D. Fischer) – 32:58	5–0

84 min
Penalties
81 min
27
Shots
30

19 March 2014; 19:30	ERC Ingolstadt	5–1 (2–0, 2–0, 1–1)	Krefeld Pinguine	Saturn Arena, Ingolstadt; Attendance: 3,456

Game reference

Timo Pielmeier
Goalies
Tomáš Duba
Referees:
Lars Brüggemann
Gordon Schukies
Linesmen:
Markku Büse
Stefan Velkoski

E. Rinke-Leitans (T. Bouck, T. Hambly) (PP) – 09:25	1–0
J. Laliberte (D. Hahn, T. Turnbull) – 17:34	2–0
T. Turnbull (D. Hahn, J. Laliberte) – 27:17	3–0
P. Hager – 27:24	4–0
P. Köppchen (T. Greilinger) (PP) – 47:17	5–0
	5–1	50:44 – K. Clark (J. Meyers, A. Courchaine) (PP)

10 min
Penalties
10 min
28
Shots
32

21 March 2014; 19:30	Krefeld Pinguine	2–3 OT (2–1, 0–1, 0–0) (OT 0–1)	ERC Ingolstadt	König Palast, Krefeld; Attendance: 8,029

Game reference

Tomáš Duba
Goalies
Timo Pielmeier
Referees:
Marcus Brill
Stephan Bauer
Linesmen:
Eugen Berger
Thomas Gemeinhardt

	0–1	03:37 – T. Greilinger (J. Laliberte) (PP)
H. Vasiļjevs (D. Pietta, D. Fischer) (PP) – 06:15	1–1
F. Méthot (M. Voakes, M. Schymainski) – 14:52	2–1
	2–2	39:19 – P. Hager (T. Greilinger, T. Hambly) (SH)
	2–3	63:34 – R. Sabolič (T. Greilinger)

10 min
Penalties
28 min
41
Shots
27

23 March 2014; 14:30	ERC Ingolstadt	5–2 (4–0, 1–1, 0–1)	Krefeld Pinguine	Saturn Arena, Ingolstadt; Attendance: 4,663

Game reference

Timo Pielmeier
Goalies
Tomáš Duba
Gerald Kuhn
Referees:
Georg Jablukov
Marian Rohatsch
Linesmen:
Christian Höck
Martin Holzer

T. Greilinger (T. Bouck, D. Hahn) – 00:26	1–0
P. Hager (A. Oblinger, C. Gawlik) – 01:34	2–0
T. Greilinger (M. Périard, T. Bouck) (PP2) – 08:45	3–0
J. Ross (Ž. Jeglič, P. Köppchen) (PP) – 09:28	4–0
T. Bouck (D. Hahn, M. Périard) (PP) – 31:30	5–0
	5–1	33:15 – J. Meyers (A. Driendl)
	5–2	50:14 – I. Sofron (D. Fischer, H. Vasiļjevs) (PP)

18 min
Penalties
20 min
30
Shots
41

26 March 2014; 19:30	Krefeld Pinguine	4–5 (3–1, 0–3, 1–1)	ERC Ingolstadt	König Palast, Krefeld; Attendance: 7,502

Game reference

Tomáš Duba
Goalies
Timo Pielmeier
Referees:
Lars Brüggemann
Gordon Schukies
Linesmen:
Andreas Kowert
Robert Schelewski

K. Clark (D. Pietta, A. Courchaine) (PP) – 02:49	1–0
J. Perrault (H. Vasiļjevs, F. Méthot) – 06:03	2–0
I. Sofron (D. Pietta, A. Courchaine) (PP) – 11:59	3–0
	3–1	12:25 – P. Köppchen (D. Hahn, T. Greilinger)
	3–2	23:09 – R. Sabolič (Ž. Jeglič, T. Turnbull)
	3–3	29:32 – J. Laliberte (T. Greilinger, P. Köppchen)
	3–4	30:51 – J. Laliberte (T. Greilinger, T. Turnbull) (PP)
K. Clark (A. Courchaine, I. Sofron) (PP) – 42:00	4–4
	4–5	53:13 – T. Greilinger (D. Hahn, J. Laliberte)

6 min
Penalties
10 min
33
Shots
20

Ingolstadt won the series 4–1.

==== Semifinals ====
The semifinals were played between 2–13 April 2014 in a Best-of-seven mode.

===== Hamburg Freezers vs. ERC Ingolstadt =====
2 April 2014; 19:30	Hamburg Freezers	1–3 (0–1, 1–1, 0–1)	ERC Ingolstadt	O_{2} World, Hamburg; Attendance: 7,023

Game reference

Dimitrij Kotschnew
Goalies
Timo Pielmeier
Referees:
Lars Brüggemann
Georg Jablukov
Linesmen:
Marcus Höfer
Sirko Hunnius

	0–1	17:19 – R. Sabolič (B. Schopper, P. Köppchen) (SH)
J. Bettauer (M. Madsen, M. Pettinger) (PP) – 29:11	1–1
	1–2	29:37 – D. Hahn (T. Greilinger, M. Périard)
	1–3	59:49 – T. Turnbull (R. Sabolič) (ENG)

4 min
Penalties
10 min
37
Shots
28

4 April 2014; 19:30	ERC Ingolstadt	5–0 (0–0, 2–0, 3–0)	Hamburg Freezers	Saturn Arena, Ingolstadt; Attendance: 4,815

Game reference

Timo Pielmeier
Goalies
Dimitrij Kotschnew
Referees:
Daniel Piechaczek
Stephan Bauer
Linesmen:
Andreas Flad
Martin Holzer

T. Turnbull – 34:38	1–0
C. Gawlik (J. Ross, P. Köppchen) – 35:37	2–0
T. Turnbull (Ž. Jeglič, T. Conboy) – 40:41	3–0
R. Sabolič (Ž. Jeglič, T. Turnbull) (ENG) – 55:45	4–0
J. Ross (A. Oblinger, P. Hager) – 57:27	5–0

12 min
Penalties
10 min
21
Shots
28

6 April 2014; 14:30	Hamburg Freezers	2–1 (1–1, 1–0, 0–0)	ERC Ingolstadt	O_{2} World, Hamburg; Attendance: 12,022

Game reference

Sébastien Caron
Goalies
Timo Pielmeier
Referees:
Georg Jablukov
Florian Zehetleitner
Linesmen:
Thomas Gemeinhardt
Andre Schrader

	0–1	01:39 – C. Gawlik (P. Hager) (SH)
M. Pettinger (D. Wolf, A. Mitchell) – 13:50	1–1
M. Madsen (D. Wolf, D. Westcott) (PP) – 32:03	2–1

12 min
Penalties
10 min
29
Shots
22

8 April 2014; 19:30	ERC Ingolstadt	5–2 (0–1, 2–1, 3–0)	Hamburg Freezers	Saturn Arena, Ingolstadt; Attendance: 4,815

Game reference

Timo Pielmeier
Goalies
Sébastien Caron
Referees:
Lars Brüggemann
Marcus Brill
Linesmen:
Benjamin Hoppe
Christoffer Hurtik

	0–1	18:45 – M. Madsen (PS)
J. Laliberte (D. Hahn, M. Périard) (PP) – 26:56	1–1
D. Hahn (T. Greilinger, T. Turnbull) (PP) – 35:40	2–1
	2–2	38:49 – J. Flaake (D. Wolf, D. Westcott)
Ž. Jeglič (M. Périard, T. Bouck) – 43:01	3–2
T. Turnbull (J. Ross, M. Périard) (PP) – 53:22	4–2
Ž. Jeglič (T. Turnbull, D. Dinger) – 58:54	5–2

20 min
Penalties
57 min
39
Shots
39

11 April 2014; 19:30	Hamburg Freezers	2–0 (1–0, 0–0, 1–0)	ERC Ingolstadt	O_{2} World, Hamburg; Attendance: 9,827

Game reference
Sébastien Caron	Goalies	Timo Pielmeier	Referees: Stephan Bauer; Daniel Piechaczek; Linesmen: Thomas Gemeinhardt; Andre Schrader
C. Schubert (D. Westcott, P. Dupuis) – 10:10 / 1–0; M. Pettinger (S. Caron) (ENG) – 58:41 / 2–0			Referees: Stephan Bauer; Daniel Piechaczek; Linesmen: Thomas Gemeinhardt; Andre Schrader
18 min	Penalties	10 min	Referees: Stephan Bauer; Daniel Piechaczek; Linesmen: Thomas Gemeinhardt; Andre Schrader
25	Shots	35	Referees: Stephan Bauer; Daniel Piechaczek; Linesmen: Thomas Gemeinhardt; Andre Schrader

13 April 2014; 14:30	ERC Ingolstadt	5–3 (2–1, 1–1, 2–1)	Hamburg Freezers	Saturn Arena, Ingolstadt; Attendance: 4,815

Game reference

Timo Pielmeier
Goalies
Sébastien Caron
Referees:
Lars Brüggemann
Daniel Piechaczek
Linesmen:
Thomas Gemeinhardt
Andre Schrader

	0–1	04:25 – G. Festerling (K. Schmidt, M. Roy)
C. Gawlik (A. Oblinger, M. Périard) – 07:07	1–1
M. Périard (P. Hager, A. Oblinger) – 07:32	2–1
R. Sabolič (J. Ross, Ž. Jeglič) (PP) – 34:36	3–1
	3–2	34:57 – A. Mitchell (J. Jakobsen)
J. Laliberte (T. Conboy) – 42:18	4–2
	4–3	58:07 – T. Oppenheimer (P. Dupuis, J. Bettauer)
T. Turnbull (A. Oblinger, J. Laliberte) (PP, ENG) – 58:47	5–3

2 min
Penalties
6 min
26
Shots
26

Ingolstadt won the series 4–2.

===== Kölner Haie vs. EHC Wolfsburg =====
2 April 2014; 19:30	Kölner Haie	1–4 (0–0, 0–2, 1–2)	EHC Wolfsburg	Lanxess Arena, Cologne; Attendance: 10,081

Game reference

Danny aus den Birken
Goalies
Sebastian Vogl
Referees:
Daniel Piechaczek
Gordon Schukies
Linesmen:
Andreas Kowert
Robert Schelewski

	0–1	30:14 – P. Pohl (B. Kohl, V. Mayer)
	0–2	31:16 – R. Abid (J. Likens, M. Rosa)
	0–3	42:53 – N. Milley (T. Haskins, A. Wurm)
A. Weiss (J. Tripp) – 45:17	1–3
	1–4	57:36 – J. Likens (N. Milley, T. Haskins)

12 min
Penalties
10 min
34
Shots
27

4 April 2014; 19:30	EHC Wolfsburg	1–4 (1–1, 0–2, 0–1)	Kölner Haie	Eisarena Wolfsburg, Wolfsburg; Attendance: 3,750

Game reference

Sebastian Vogl
Goalies
Danny aus den Birken
Referees:
Marcus Brill
Georg Jablukov
Linesmen:
Nikolaj Ponomarjow
Seedo Janssen

M. Rosa (R. Abid, M. Dzieduszycki) – 04:43	1–0
	1–1	05:29 – M. Lüdemann (R. Collins, P. Gogulla)
	1–2	23:57 – M. Hannula (M. Mueller, A. Falk)
	1–3	31:48 – P. Riefers (R. Tičar, M. Ohmann)
	1–4	42:31 – C. Minard (R. Collins, B. Krupp)

8 min
Penalties
12 min
27
Shots
29

6 April 2014; 14:30	Kölner Haie	3–0 (0–0, 1–0, 2–0)	EHC Wolfsburg	Lanxess Arena, Cologne; Attendance: 15,352

Game reference

Danny aus den Birken
Goalies
Sebastian Vogl
Referees:
Andreas Aumüller
Lars Brüggemann
Linesmen:
Benjamin Hoppe
Christoffer Hurtik

A. Holmqvist (M. Mueller, R. Collins) (PP) – 32:31	1–0
C. Minard (M. Hannula) – 58:55	2–0
Y. Hagos (A. Holmqvist, A. Weiss) (PP) – 59:15	3–0

8 min
Penalties
18 min
31
Shots
31

8 April 2014; 19:30	EHC Wolfsburg	2–3 (2–1, 0–1, 0–1)	Kölner Haie	Eisarena Wolfsburg, Wolfsburg; Attendance: 3,300

Game reference

Sebastian Vogl
Goalies
Danny aus den Birken
Referees:
Daniel Piechaczek
Gordon Schukies
Linesmen:
Marcus Höfer
Sirko Hunnius

	0–1	08:35 – C. Minard (A. Holmqvist, R. Collins) (PP)
S. Furchner (N. Milley, T. Haskins) – 09:24	1–1
R. Abid (M. Rosa, A. Brocklehurst) – 15:33	2–1
	2–2	37:44 – M. Mueller (A. Holmqvist, A. Falk)
	2–3	52:43 – D. Tjärnqvist (R. Collins, P. Gogulla)

10 min
Penalties
12 min
33
Shots
42

10 April 2014; 19:30	Kölner Haie	2–1 2OT (0–0, 1–0, 0–1) (OT: 0–0, 1–0)	EHC Wolfsburg	Lanxess Arena, Cologne; Attendance: 12,338

Game reference

Danny aus den Birken
Goalies
Sebastian Vogl
Referees:
Marcus Brill
Georg Jablukov
Linesmen:
Andreas Kowert
Robert Schelewski

P. Gogulla – 23:41	1–0
	1–1	51:24 – M. Dzieduszycki (N. Milley)
M. Ohmann (D. Tjärnqvist, P. Riefers) – 67:28	2–1

20 min
Penalties
24 min
50
Shots
22

Köln won the series 4–1.

==== Final ====
The final was played between 17 and 29 April 2014 in a Best-of-seven mode.

===== Kölner Haie vs. ERC Ingolstadt =====
17 April 2014; 19:30	Kölner Haie	4–2 (0–0, 3–2, 1–0)	ERC Ingolstadt	Lanxess Arena, Cologne; Attendance: 15,167

Game reference

Danny aus den Birken
Goalies
Timo Pielmeier
Referees:
Daniel Piechaczek
Stephan Bauer
Linesmen:
Thomas Gemeinhardt
Andre Schrader

R. Collins (P. Gogulla, C. Minard) – 34:05	1–0
P. Gogulla (C. Minard, D. Tjärnqvist) – 35:05	2–0
R. Collins (A. Weiss, D. Tjärnqvist) – 37:24	3–0
	3–1	37:34 – G. Claaßen (J-F. Boucher, T. Bouck)
	3–2	39:03 – R. Sabolič (P. Köppchen, Ž. Jeglič)
C. Minard (A. Holmqvist, R. Collins) (PP) – 43:40	4–2

12 min
Penalties
14 min
34
Shots
27

19 April 2014; 17:30	ERC Ingolstadt	1–3 (1–2, 0–0, 0–1)	Kölner Haie	Saturn Arena, Ingolstadt; Attendance: 4,815

Game reference

Timo Pielmeier
Goalies
Danny aus den Birken
Referees:
Lars Brüggemann
Florian Zehetleitner
Linesmen:
Benjamin Hoppe
Christoffer Hurtik

D. Hahn (T. Greilinger, T. Conboy) – 02:08	1–0
	1–1	07:33 – M. Lüdemann (A. Falk)
	1–2	15:39 – M. Ohmann (D. Tjärnqvist, P. Riefers)
	1–3	59:44 – C. Minard (R. Collins, P. Gogulla)

6 min
Penalties
10 min
38
Shots
35

21 April 2014; 14:30	Kölner Haie	1–4 (1–1, 0–1, 0–2)	ERC Ingolstadt	Lanxess Arena, Cologne; Attendance: 18,548

Game reference

Danny aus den Birken
Goalies
Timo Pielmeier
Referees:
Lars Brüggemann
Daniel Piechaczek
Linesmen:
Thomas Gemeinhardt
Andre Schrader

	0–1	04:14 – J-F. Boucher (P. Köppchen, B. Barta)
C. Minard (R. Collins, P. Gogulla) – 04:37	1–1
	1–2	38:58 – D. Hahn (T. Turnbull, M. Périard) (PP)
	1–3	55:45 – R. Sabolič (P. Hager, D. Dinger)
	1–4	59:30 – P. Köppchen (J. Laliberte)

22 min
Penalties
22 min
41
Shots
30

22 April 2014; 19:30	ERC Ingolstadt	4–1 (1–0, 1–1, 2–0)	Kölner Haie	Saturn Arena, Ingolstadt; Attendance: 4,815

Game reference

Timo Pielmeier
Goalies
Danny aus den Birken
Referees:
Lars Brüggemann
Daniel Piechaczek
Linesmen:
Thomas Gemeinhardt
Andre Schrader

D. Hahn (T. Greilinger, J. Laliberte) – 08:47	1–0
J-F. Boucher (T. Turnbull, R. Sabolič) – 37:05	2–0
	2–1	38:29 – D. Tjärnqvist (R. Collins) (PP2)
T. Bouck (R. Sabolič) (PP) – 54:44	3–1
R. Sabolič (Ž. Jeglič) (ENG) – 58:38	4–1

10 min
Penalties
8 min
31
Shots
32

25 April 2014; 19:30	Kölner Haie	3–4 OT (2–0, 1–2, 0–1) (OT: 0–1)	ERC Ingolstadt	Lanxess Arena, Cologne; Attendance: 18,571

Game reference

Danny aus den Birken
Goalies
Timo Pielmeier
Referees:
Lars Brüggemann
Daniel Piechaczek
Linesmen:
Thomas Gemeinhardt
Andre Schrader

M. Ohmann (M. Mueller, C. Stephens) – 08:57	1–0
P. Gogulla (M. Hannula, D. Tjärnqvist (PP) – 11:21	2–0
	2–1	30:09 – R. Sabolič (Ž. Jeglič, P. Köppchen)
	2–2	36:53 – T. Greilinger (D. Hahn, J. Laliberte)
T. Ankert (C. Stephens) – 38:33	3–2
	3–3	43:42 – P. Köppchen (B. Barta, J-F. Boucher)
	3–4	69:30 – T. Turnbull (Ž. Jeglič, M. Periard)

12 min
Penalties
14 min
47
Shots
30

27 April 2014; 14:30	ERC Ingolstadt	0–1 OT (0–0, 0–0, 0–0) (OT: 0–1)	Kölner Haie	Saturn Arena, Ingolstadt; Attendance: 4,815

Game reference
Timo Pielmeier	Goalies	Danny aus den Birken	Referees: Lars Brüggemann; Daniel Piechaczek; Linesmen: Thomas Gemeinhardt; Andre Schrader
0–1 / 63:56 – M. Lüdemann (T. Ankert, P. Gogulla)			Referees: Lars Brüggemann; Daniel Piechaczek; Linesmen: Thomas Gemeinhardt; Andre Schrader
40 min	Penalties	65 min	Referees: Lars Brüggemann; Daniel Piechaczek; Linesmen: Thomas Gemeinhardt; Andre Schrader
30	Shots	29	Referees: Lars Brüggemann; Daniel Piechaczek; Linesmen: Thomas Gemeinhardt; Andre Schrader

29 April 2014; 19:30	Kölner Haie	0–2 (0–0, 0–1, 0–1)	ERC Ingolstadt	Lanxess Arena, Cologne; Attendance: 18,666

Game reference
Danny aus den Birken	Goalies	Timo Pielmeier	Referees: Lars Brüggemann; Daniel Piechaczek; Linesmen: Thomas Gemeinhardt; Andre Schrader
0–1 / 36:15 – C. Gawlik (P. Hager, T. Conboy); 0–2 / 40:28 – J. Laliberte			Referees: Lars Brüggemann; Daniel Piechaczek; Linesmen: Thomas Gemeinhardt; Andre Schrader
4 min	Penalties	6 min	Referees: Lars Brüggemann; Daniel Piechaczek; Linesmen: Thomas Gemeinhardt; Andre Schrader
27	Shots	31	Referees: Lars Brüggemann; Daniel Piechaczek; Linesmen: Thomas Gemeinhardt; Andre Schrader

Ingolstadt won the series 4–3.
