= Patrick Buzas =

German-Hungarian ice hockey player

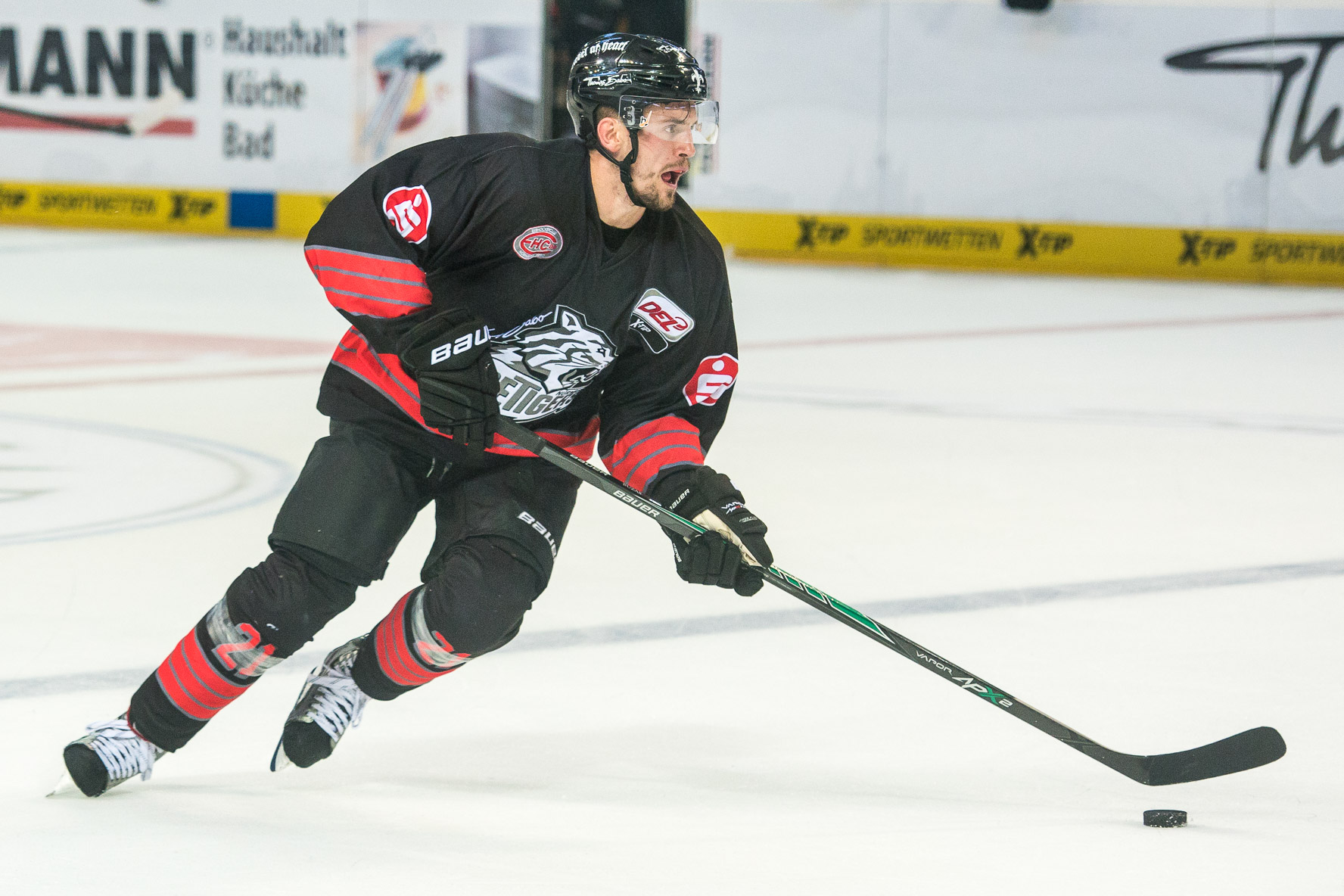
- Born: 17 May 1987 (age 39) Augsburg, Germany
- Height: 6 ft 0 in (183 cm)
- Weight: 187 lb (85 kg; 13 st 5 lb)
- Position: Centre
- Shot: Left
- Played for: Augsburg Panthers; ERC Ingolstadt; Hannover Scorpions; Thomas Sabo Ice Tigers; Düsseldorfer EG
- Playing career: 2005–2021

Patrick Buzas (born 17 May 1987) is a German-Hungarian former professional ice hockey forward. He most recently played for Düsseldorfer EG in the Deutsche Eishockey Liga (DEL). He previously played 6 seasons with the Thomas Sabo Ice Tigers.

On 20 April 2018, Buzas opted to leave the Ice Tigers as a free agent, signing a one-year deal with Düsseldorfer EG, his fifth top flight club.

== Career statistics ==
			Regular season					Playoffs
Season	Team	League	GP	G	A	Pts	PIM	GP	G	A	Pts	PIM
2003–04	Augsburger EV II	Germany4	18	3	4	7	0	—	—	—	—	—
2004–05	Augsburger EV II	Germany4	24	7	13	20	34	—	—	—	—	—
2005–06	EV Landsberg 2000	Germany3	19	3	5	8	14	8	1	0	1	8
2005–06	Augsburger Panther	DEL	44	1	1	2	10	—	—	—	—	—
2006–07	Augsburger Panther	DEL	45	8	15	23	32	—	—	—	—	—
2007–08	Augsburger Panther	DEL	49	14	14	28	42	—	—	—	—	—
2008–09	Augsburger Panther	DEL	51	6	10	16	40	4	0	1	1	0
2010–11	ERC Ingolstadt	DEL	52	5	15	20	8	4	0	0	0	0
2010–11	Landshut Cannibals	Germany2	2	0	4	4	0	—	—	—	—	—
2011–12	Hannover Scorpions	DEL	52	9	9	18	10	—	—	—	—	—
2012–13	Nürnberg Ice Tigers	DEL	18	2	3	5	4	3	0	1	1	0
2013–14	Nürnberg Ice Tigers	DEL	12	4	3	7	4	6	0	1	1	2
2014–15	Nürnberg Ice Tigers	DEL	43	4	4	8	20	7	1	0	1	2
2015–16	Nürnberg Ice Tigers	DEL	44	1	5	6	20	12	1	1	2	8
2016–17	Nürnberg Ice Tigers	DEL	35	1	1	2	16	13	0	0	0	4
2017–18	Nürnberg Ice Tigers	DEL	43	1	6	7	28	12	0	3	3	2
2018–19	Düsseldorfer EG	DEL	52	7	3	10	22	7	1	0	1	16
2019–20	Düsseldorfer EG	DEL	51	4	1	5	28	—	—	—	—	—
2020–21	Düsseldorfer EG	DEL	26	2	4	6	2	—	—	—	—	—
DEL totals			617	69	94	163	286	68	3	7	10	34
