= Brett Palin =

Canadian ice hockey player

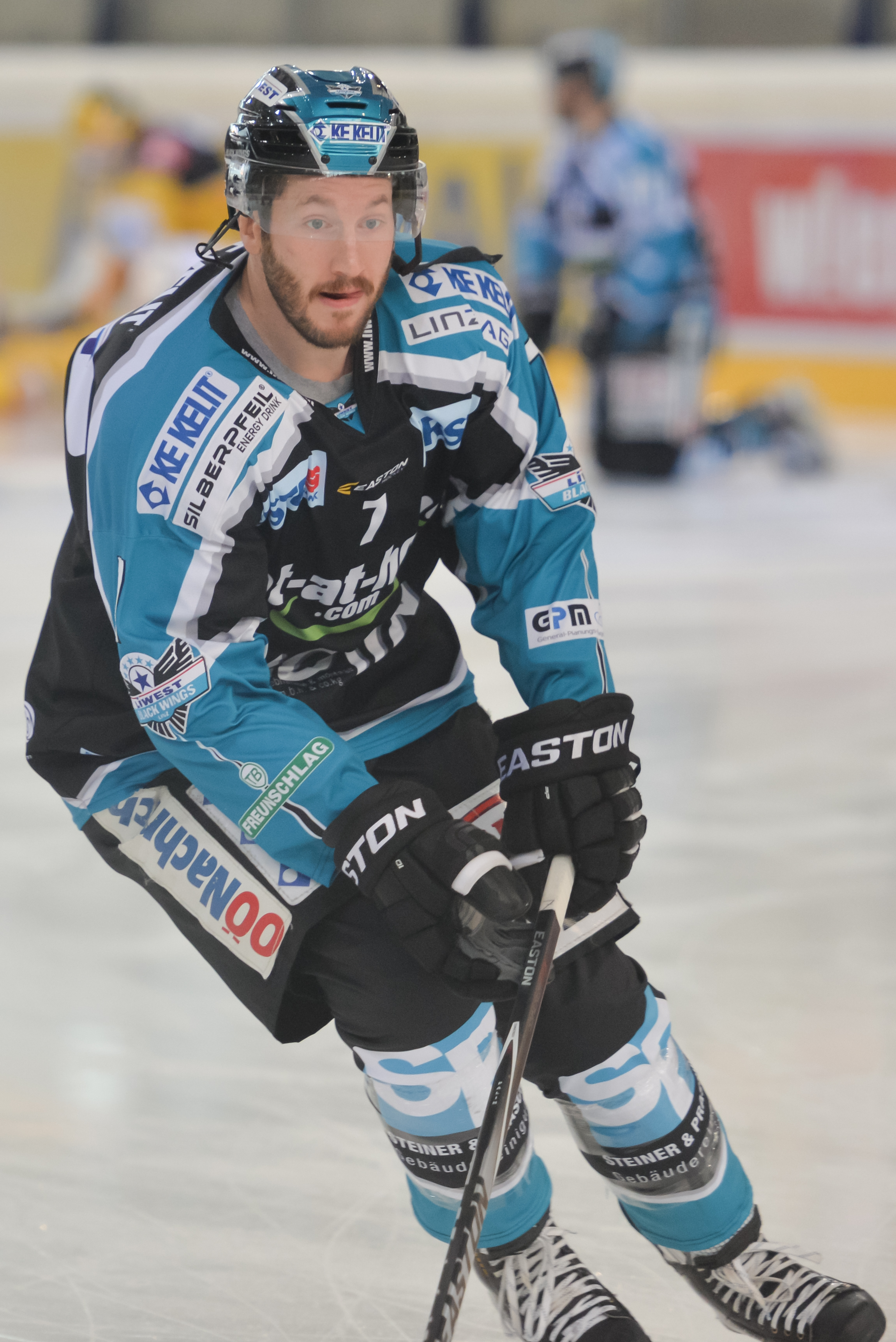
- Born: June 23, 1984 (age 42) Nanaimo, British Columbia, Canada
- Height: 6 ft 2 in (188 cm)
- Weight: 203 lb (92 kg; 14 st 7 lb)
- Position: Defence
- Shot: Right
- Played for: Omaha Ak-Sar-Ben Knights; Quad City Flames; Abbotsford Heat; Milwaukee Admirals; KLH Chomutov; Grizzly Adams Wolfsburg; Mora IK; EHC Black Wings Linz; Fehérvár AV19
- NHL draft: Undrafted
- Playing career: 2005–2018

Brett Palin (born June 23, 1984 in Nanaimo, British Columbia) is a Canadian former professional ice hockey defenceman.

== Playing career ==
Palin played junior hockey with the Kelowna Rockets of the Western Hockey League (WHL), winning the league championship in 2003 and 2005, and the Memorial Cup in 2004. He was a prospect in the Calgary Flames system, having signed with the franchise in 2005 as an undrafted free agent. On July 7, 2010, he signed with the Nashville Predators and was assigned to captain AHL affiliate, the Milwaukee Admirals.

After beginning his European career with KLH Chomutov of the Czech Extraliga for two seasons, Palin signed a one-year contract in Germany with Grizzly Adams Wolfsburg of the Deutsche Eishockey Liga on May 8, 2013.

On June 3, 2015, Palin left the HockeyAllsvenskan after one season with Mora IK and signed a one-year contract with Austrian club, EHC Black Wings Linz of the Austrian Hockey League (EBEL). Palin played two seasons with the Black Wings before concluding his career with Hungarian EBEL club, Fehérvár AV19, in the 2017–18 season.

== Career statistics ==
			Regular season					Playoffs
Season	Team	League	GP	G	A	Pts	PIM	GP	G	A	Pts	PIM
2000–01	Kelowna Rockets	WHL	39	0	0	0	25	—	—	—	—	—
2001–02	Kelowna Rockets	WHL	70	0	1	1	88	15	0	0	0	4
2002–03	Kelowna Rockets	WHL	71	1	17	18	118	19	0	4	4	12
2003–04	Kelowna Rockets	WHL	72	1	16	17	106	17	0	5	5	24
2004–05	Kelowna Rockets	WHL	72	4	21	25	71	24	4	6	10	52
2005–06	Omaha Ak-Sar-Ben Knights	AHL	64	0	5	5	46	—	—	—	—	—
2006–07	Omaha Ak-Sar-Ben Knights	AHL	78	1	9	10	71	6	1	0	1	0
2007–08	Quad City Flames	AHL	67	0	10	10	68	—	—	—	—	—
2008–09	Quad City Flames	AHL	57	5	10	15	40	—	—	—	—	—
2009–10	Abbotsford Heat	AHL	21	0	3	3	17	2	0	0	0	2
2010–11	Milwaukee Admirals	AHL	80	4	14	18	70	13	0	1	1	4
2011–12	Piráti Chomutov	CZE.1	51	6	12	18	79	19	0	3	3	14
2012–13	Piráti Chomutov	ELH	50	6	7	13	58	—	—	—	—	—
2013–14	Grizzly Adams Wolfsburg	DEL	50	7	14	21	56	6	0	1	1	0
2014–15	Mora IK	Allsv	51	4	9	13	55	5	0	1	1	6
2015–16	EHC Black Wings Linz	EBEL	54	5	9	14	37	12	1	4	5	2
2016–17	EHC Black Wings Linz	EBEL	54	2	16	18	42	5	0	1	1	0
2017–18	Fehérvár AV19	EBEL	26	1	6	7	18	—	—	—	—	—
AHL totals			367	10	51	61	312	21	1	1	2	6
