= Thomas Oppenheimer =

German ice hockey player (born 1988)

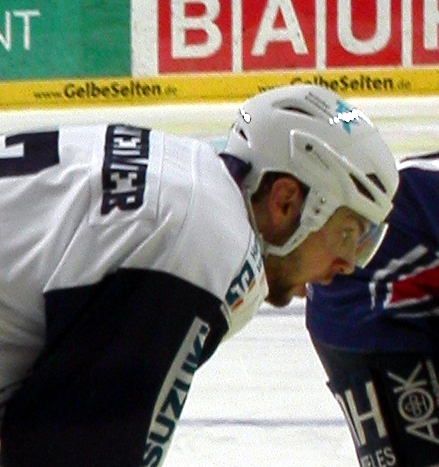
- Born: December 16, 1988 (age 37) Peißenberg, West Germany
- Height: 6 ft 1 in (185 cm)
- Weight: 192 lb (87 kg; 13 st 10 lb)
- Position: Forward
- Shoots: Right
- DEL team Former teams: Free Agent; Frankfurt Lions; Hamburg Freezers; ERC Ingolstadt; Eisbären Berlin
- National team: Germany
- Playing career: 2006–present

Thomas Oppenheimer (born December 16, 1988) is a German professional ice hockey forward who is currently an unrestricted free agent. He previously played under contract with Eisbären Berlin of the Deutsche Eishockey Liga (DEL).

== Playing career ==
A native of Toledo, Ohio, Oppenheimer made his debut in Germany's top-tier Deutsche Eishockey Liga (DEL) in the course of the 2006-07 season. In 2010, he left the Frankfurt Lions to join fellow DEL side Hamburg Freezers and developed into an integral part of the side over the years. In 2015-16, which turned out to be the last season of the Hamburg team, he scored 21 goals in 52 regular season contests along with 13 assists, while serving as an assistant captain.

With the announcement of the Hamburg Freezers ceasing operations and folding in May 2016. A couple of days later, Oppenheimer signed a five-year deal with another DEL club, ERC Ingolstadt, on June 1, 2016. On June 6, 2017, he was traded to fellow DEL team Eisbären Berlin.

== International play ==
Oppenheimer represented the German men's national team at the 2014 and 2015 World Championships.

== Career statistics ==
=== Regular season and playoffs ===
			Regular season					Playoffs
Season	Team	League	GP	G	A	Pts	PIM	GP	G	A	Pts	PIM
2005–06	EC Peiting	3.GBun	28	6	6	12	4	—	—	—	—	—
2006–07	EC Peiting	3.GBun	24	6	6	12	32	—	—	—	—	—
2006–07	Frankfurt Lions	DEL	29	6	4	10	10	8	0	0	0	6
2007–08	Frankfurt Lions	DEL	20	0	2	2	2	1	0	0	0	0
2007–08	SC Riessersee	2.GBun	25	9	9	18	28	—	—	—	—	—
2008–09	Frankfurt Lions	DEL	52	4	7	11	24	5	0	0	0	0
2009–10	Frankfurt Lions	DEL	56	10	8	18	22	4	1	0	1	6
2010–11	Hamburg Freezers	DEL	44	6	5	11	24	—	—	—	—	—
2011–12	Hamburg Freezers	DEL	52	13	9	22	12	5	0	1	1	4
2012–13	Hamburg Freezers	DEL	41	12	13	25	44	3	0	4	4	2
2013–14	Hamburg Freezers	DEL	52	21	17	38	52	12	1	4	5	35
2014–15	Hamburg Freezers	DEL	49	17	13	30	58	7	4	2	6	4
2015–16	Hamburg Freezers	DEL	52	21	13	34	48	—	—	—	—	—
2016–17	ERC Ingolstadt	DEL	52	19	14	33	54	2	0	2	2	6
2017–18	Eisbären Berlin	DEL	38	7	20	27	22	16	1	6	7	16
2018–19	Eisbären Berlin	DEL	1	1	0	1	0	—	—	—	—	—
DEL totals			538	137	125	262	372	63	7	19	26	97

=== International ===
Year	Team	Event	GP	G	A	Pts	PIM
2008	Germany	WJC-D1	5	3	3	6	4
2014	Germany	WC	7	4	2	6	2
2015	Germany	WC	6	0	0	0	4
Junior totals			5	3	3	6	4
Senior totals			13	4	2	6	6
