= Simon Danner =

German professional ice hockey forward

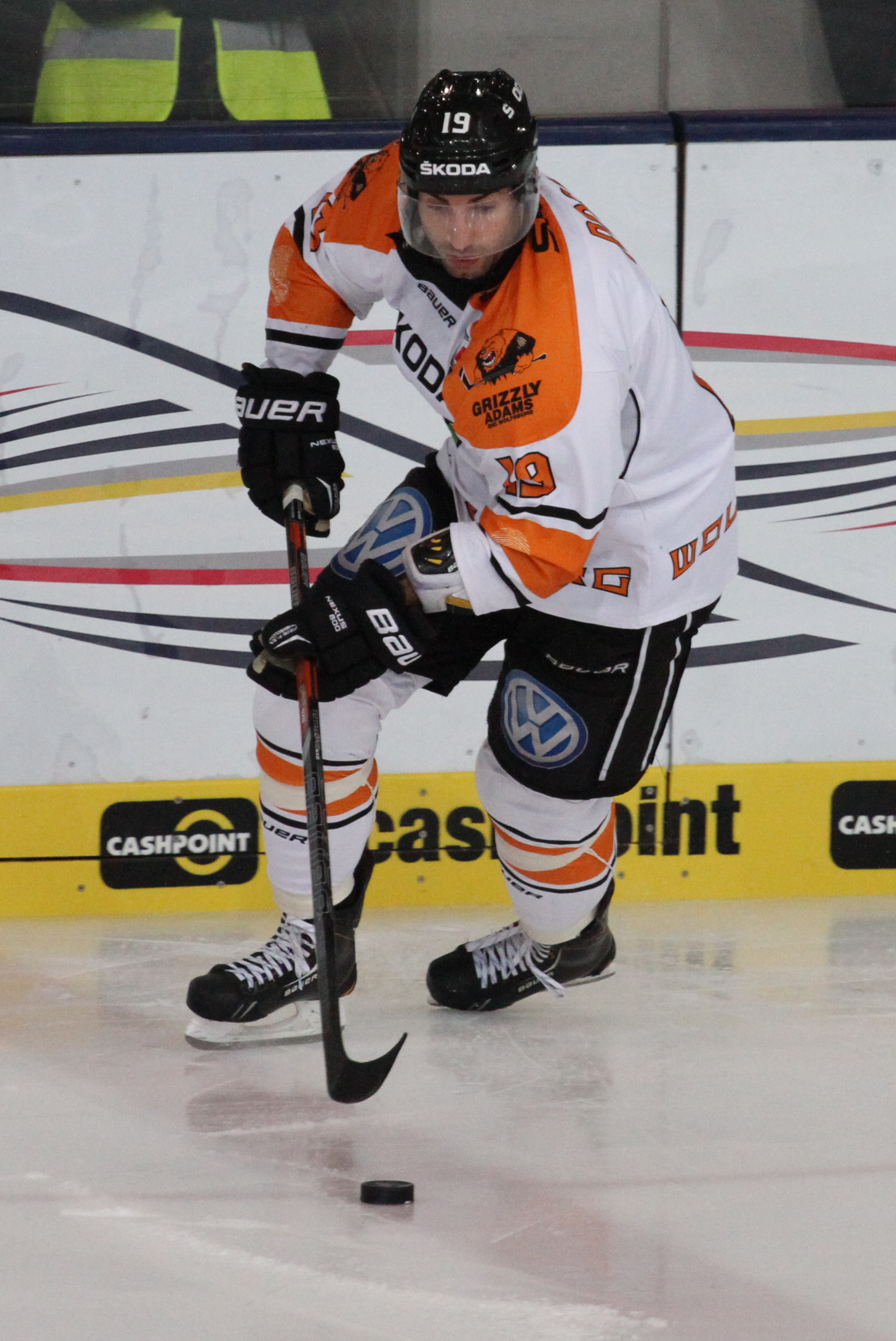
- Born: December 25, 1986 (age 39) Freiburg, Germany
- Height: 6 ft 0 in (183 cm)
- Weight: 181 lb (82 kg; 12 st 13 lb)
- Position: Right wing
- Shoots: Right
- DEL2 team Former teams: EHC Freiburg; Augsburger Panther; Frankfurt Lions; DEG Metro Stars; Grizzly Adams Wolfsburg; Schwenninger Wild Wings
- Playing career: 2003–present

Simon Danner (born December 25, 1986) is a German professional ice hockey forward who currently plays for EHC Freiburg of the DEL2. Danner previously played in the Deutsche Eishockey Liga (DEL) with the DEG Metro Stars after he joined them from the Frankfurt Lions on July 13, 2010. After two seasons with the Metro Stars, Danner signed a one-year contract with Grizzly Adams Wolfsburg on April 2, 2012.

== Career statistics ==
=== Regular season and playoffs ===
			Regular season					Playoffs
Season	Team	League	GP	G	A	Pts	PIM	GP	G	A	Pts	PIM
2002–03	Wölfe Freiburg	2.GBun	16	0	1	1	2	11	0	0	0	0
2003–04	Wölfe Freiburg	DEL	28	0	0	0	4	—	—	—	—	—
2004–05	Wölfe Freiburg	2.GBun	49	9	13	22	56	—	—	—	—	—
2004–05	Augsburger Panther	DEL	1	0	0	0	2	—	—	—	—	—
2005–06	Frankfurt Lions	DEL	32	3	8	11	55	—	—	—	—	—
2005–06	Wölfe Freiburg	2.GBun	23	1	5	6	48	—	—	—	—	—
2006–07	Frankfurt Lions	DEL	52	7	6	13	70	8	0	2	2	20
2006–07	Wölfe Freiburg	3.GBun	4	3	5	8	18	—	—	—	—	—
2007–08	Frankfurt Lions	DEL	56	1	5	6	34	12	1	0	1	4
2007–08	Wölfe Freiburg	3.GBun	6	4	4	8	22	—	—	—	—	—
2008–09	Frankfurt Lions	DEL	52	5	11	16	48	5	0	1	1	2
2009–10	Frankfurt Lions	DEL	45	8	8	16	49	4	0	0	0	0
2010–11	DEG Metro Stars	DEL	50	10	7	17	18	9	3	3	6	4
2011–12	DEG Metro Stars	DEL	49	6	11	17	58	7	0	0	0	4
2012–13	Grizzly Adams Wolfsburg	DEL	4	0	0	0	0	—	—	—	—	—
2013–14	Grizzly Adams Wolfsburg	DEL	47	4	3	7	60	11	1	1	2	6
2014–15	Schwenninger Wild Wings	DEL	42	6	5	11	43	—	—	—	—	—
2015–16	Schwenninger Wild Wings	DEL	50	14	9	23	59	—	—	—	—	—
2016–17	Schwenninger Wild Wings	DEL	52	7	10	17	30	—	—	—	—	—
2017–18	Schwenninger Wild Wings	DEL	48	6	7	13	24	2	1	1	2	0
2018–19	Schwenninger Wild Wings	DEL	52	7	17	24	34	—	—	—	—	—
2019–20	Schwenninger Wild Wings	DEL	3	0	1	1	0	—	—	—	—	—
2019–20	EHC Freiburg	DEL2	10	2	4	6	18	—	—	—	—	—
2020–21	EHC Freiburg	DEL2	47	9	10	19	30	2	2	1	3	0
2021–22	EHC Freiburg	DEL2	44	8	13	21	34	6	2	2	4	0
DEL totals			663	84	108	192	588	60	6	8	14	40

=== International ===
Year	Team	Event	Result	GP	G	A	Pts	PIM
2004	Germany	U18-D1	11th	5	0	0	0	10
2006	Germany	WJC-D1	11th	5	1	1	2	6
Junior totals				10	1	1	2	16
