= Tyler Haskins =

American ice hockey player (born 1986)

- Haskins in 2026
- Born: May 26, 1986 (age 40) Madison, Ohio, U.S.
- Height: 6 ft 0 in (183 cm)
- Weight: 183 lb (83 kg; 13 st 1 lb)
- Position: Center
- Shot: Right
- Played for: Bridgeport Sound Tigers; Grizzlys Wolfsburg
- NHL draft: 162nd overall, 2004; Detroit Red Wings
- Playing career: 2007–2018

Tyler Haskins (born May 26, 1986) is a retired American professional ice hockey forward. He was drafted by the Detroit Red Wings in the fifth round, 162nd overall, of the 2004 NHL entry draft.

== Playing career ==
Haskins began his career playing in the USHL for the Sioux City Musketeers and in the OHL for both the Guelph Storm and the Toronto St. Michael's Majors. From 2007 to 2010, he appeared in 164 AHL games with the Bridgeport Sound Tigers, with a brief period spent playing for the ECHL's Utah Grizzlies. In May 2008, he signed a contract with the New York Islanders, the NHL affiliate of the Sound Tigers.

He joined Grizzlys Wolfsburg, a team competing in Germany's highest professional ice hockey league, the Deutsche Eishockey Liga (DEL), ahead of the 2010–11 season. His leadership qualities and on-ice performance were recognized by the organization, and in 2013, he was named team captain. Throughout his time in Wolfsburg, Haskins attracted interest from several other clubs, who offered him opportunities to continue his career elsewhere. However, he remained loyal to the Grizzlys, valuing his connection to the team and the city. On February 24, 2016, he reaffirmed his commitment to the organization by signing a contract extension that would keep him with Wolfsburg until 2020.

On March 26, 2018, he officially announced his retirement from professional hockey, effective immediately, bringing an end to his playing career. The decision was made in response to multiple concussions he had suffered over the years, which raised serious concerns about his long-term health and well-being. Despite stepping away from the ice, he remained a part of the Grizzlys Wolfsburg organization, transitioning into a new chapter of his career as a scout.

== Career statistics ==
			Regular season					Playoffs
Season	Team	League	GP	G	A	Pts	PIM	GP	G	A	Pts	PIM
2001–02	Sioux City Musketeers	USHL	46	3	8	11	20	12	1	0	1	15
2002–03	Guelph Storm	OHL	54	7	14	21	14	11	3	2	5	10
2003–04	Guelph Storm	OHL	9	1	3	4	2	—	—	—	—	—
2003–04	Toronto St. Michael's Majors	OHL	54	17	24	41	30	18	5	4	9	10
2004–05	Toronto St. Michael's Majors	OHL	62	12	20	32	64	10	6	4	10	20
2005–06	Toronto St. Michael's Majors	OHL	56	24	51	75	112	4	1	4	5	8
2006–07	Saginaw Spirit	OHL	65	11	60	71	90	6	1	1	2	10
2007–08	Utah Grizzlies	ECHL	41	16	27	43	20	15	6	9	15	10
2007–08	Bridgeport Sound Tigers	AHL	25	1	3	4	16	—	—	—	—	—
2008–09	Bridgeport Sound Tigers	AHL	72	10	15	25	53	5	0	1	1	0
2009–10	Bridgeport Sound Tigers	AHL	67	12	18	30	30	5	0	0	0	4
2010–11	Grizzly Adams Wolfsburg	DEL	49	11	28	39	34	9	2	7	9	6
2011–12	Grizzly Adams Wolfsburg	DEL	28	10	17	27	28	—	—	—	—	—
2012–13	Grizzly Adams Wolfsburg	DEL	37	5	21	26	30	12	3	3	6	8
2013–14	Grizzly Adams Wolfsburg	DEL	48	12	24	36	53	11	3	7	10	8
2014–15	Grizzly Adams Wolfsburg	DEL	41	5	21	26	28	8	2	7	9	6
2015–16	Grizzlys Wolfsburg	DEL	49	12	31	43	52	15	1	12	13	8
2016–17	Grizzlys Wolfsburg	DEL	42	7	27	34	46	18	3	11	14	20
2017–18	Grizzlys Wolfsburg	DEL	38	7	26	33	14	—	—	—	—	—
AHL totals			164	23	36	59	99	10	0	1	1	4
DEL totals			332	69	195	264	285	73	14	47	61	56
