= T. J. Mulock =

Canadian-German ice hockey player

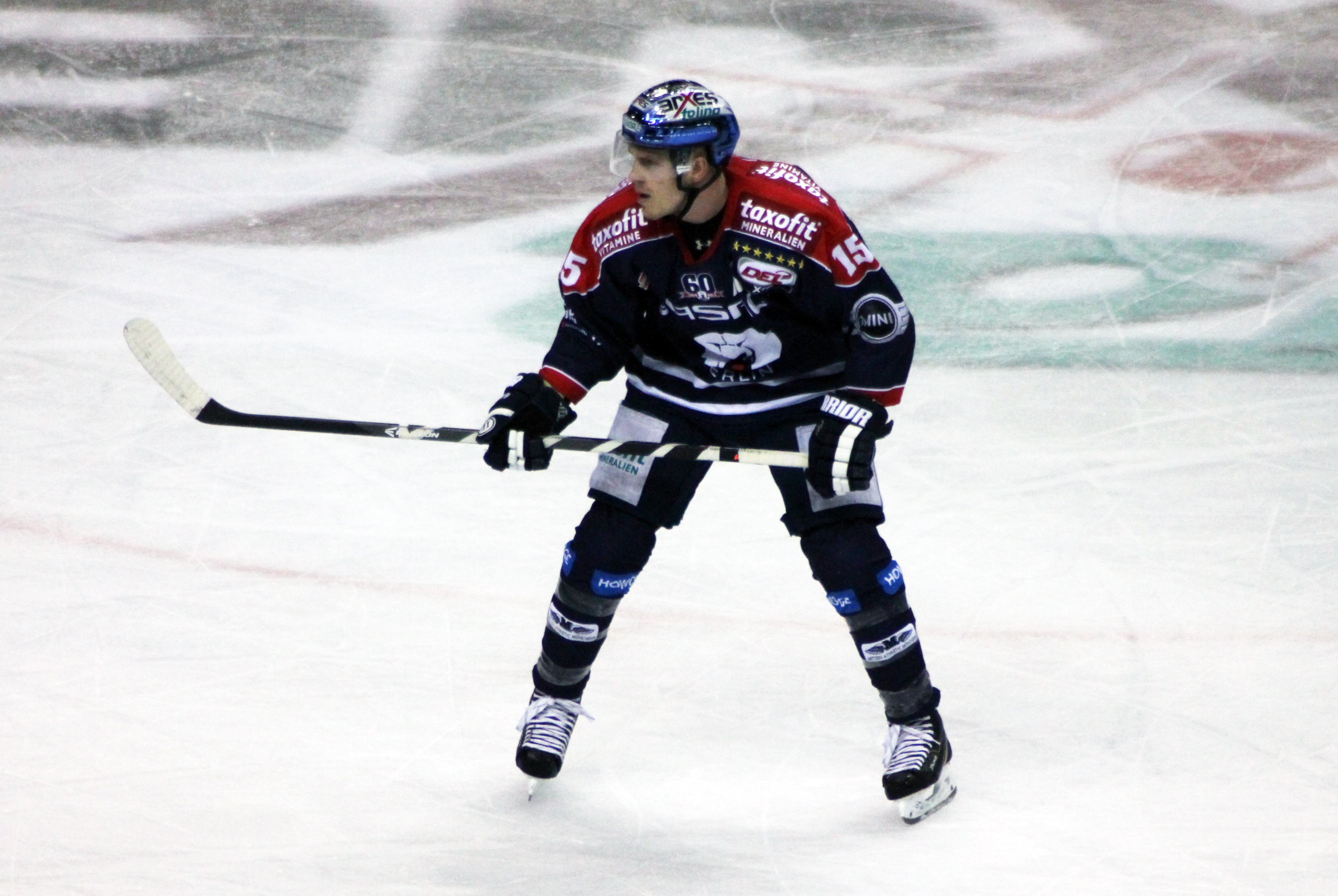
- Born: June 25, 1985 (age 39); Langley, British Columbia, Canada
- Height: 6 ft 0 in (183 cm)
- Weight: 192 lb (87 kg; 13 st 10 lb)
- Position: Right Wing
- Shoots: Right
- DEL team Former teams: Free Agent; Eisbären Berlin; Kölner Haie; Straubing Tigers
- National team: Germany
- NHL draft: Undrafted
- Playing career: 2006–present

Travis James Mulock (born June 25, 1985) is a Canadian-German professional ice hockey forward currently an unrestricted free agent. He most recently played with the Straubing Tigers of the Deutsche Eishockey Liga (DEL).

== Playing career ==
Mulock played junior ice hockey with the Vancouver Giants of the Western Hockey League during the 2001–02 and 2002–03 seasons. The next year he joined the Regina Pats. During the next two seasons he played with the Surrey Eagles of the British Columbia Hockey League. He played his final season of junior hockey in 2005–06 with the Kamloops Blazers. After six season of juniors, Mulock joined Bad Toelz EC of the German third-tier Oberliga. He played with Bad Tölz for three seasons before joining Eisbären Berlin of the German elite league Deutsche Eishockey Liga (DEL) in 2009. In his first season with Berlin in 2009–10, Mulock scored 20 goals to be selected as the DEL's rookie of the year. He won three straight German championships with the Eisbären squad from 2011 to 2013.

Mulock left Berlin after the 2015–16 season and signed a one-year contract with fellow DEL side Kölner Haie on April 20, 2016. Used primarily in a defensive checking role, Mulock recorded a career low in registering just 2 goals and 9 points in 46 games during the 2017–18 season.

On April 23, 2018, Mulock as a free agent signed a one-year contract to continue in the DEL with the Straubing Tigers.

== International play ==
Mulock was selected to play for the German national team at the 2010 Winter Olympics in Vancouver, close to his hometown of Langley. As a Canadian, he was eligible to compete with the German team having played exclusively in Germany for more than two seasons and because he holds dual citizenship to Canada and Germany.

== Personal life ==
His brother Tyson Mulock is also a professional ice hockey player. Their grandfather Horst emigrated from Germany to Canada after World War II.

== Career statistics ==
=== Regular season and playoffs ===
			Regular season					Playoffs
Season	Team	League	GP	G	A	Pts	PIM	GP	G	A	Pts	PIM
2001–02	Vancouver Giants	WHL	40	3	7	10	6	—	—	—	—	—
2002–03	Vancouver Giants	WHL	40	4	5	9	4	—	—	—	—	—
2002–03	Regina Pats	WHL	31	3	7	10	15	4	0	1	1	0
2003–04	Surrey Eagles	BCHL	55	29	47	76	41	13	10	11	21	10
2004–05	Surrey Eagles	BCHL	53	21	60	81	61	26	10	29	39	32
2005–06	Kamloops Blazers	WHL	59	16	29	45	37	—	—	—	—	—
2006–07	Ratinger Ice Aliens	GER.3	17	11	20	31	14	—	—	—	—	—
2006–07	EC Bad Tölz	GER.3	29	21	22	43	26	12	0	7	7	8
2007–08	EC Bad Tölz	GER.3	42	28	51	79	24	8	5	13	18	8
2008–09	EC Bad Tölz	GER.2	43	22	38	60	14	—	—	—	—	—
2009–10	Eisbären Berlin	DEL	48	20	22	42	28	5	0	0	0	2
2010–11	Eisbären Berlin	DEL	34	12	13	25	14	12	6	11	17	8
2011–12	Eisbären Berlin	DEL	48	9	23	32	40	13	3	3	6	4
2012–13	Eisbären Berlin	DEL	43	16	27	43	28	13	7	9	16	6
2013–14	Eisbären Berlin	DEL	52	16	32	48	32	3	0	2	2	0
2014–15	Eisbären Berlin	DEL	52	7	29	36	18	3	0	1	1	2
2015–16	Eisbären Berlin	DEL	52	5	15	20	36	7	1	1	2	0
2016–17	Kölner Haie	DEL	50	4	14	18	41	7	0	0	0	2
2017–18	Kölner Haie	DEL	46	2	7	9	8	6	1	0	1	4
2018–19	Straubing Tigers	DEL	47	1	15	16	20	2	0	1	1	0
2019–20	Straubing Tigers	DEL	44	14	7	21	26	—	—	—	—	—
2020–21	Straubing Tigers	DEL	37	3	5	8	12	3	1	0	1	0
2021–22	Straubing Tigers	DEL	54	4	7	11	16	4	0	0	0	0
DEL totals			607	113	216	329	319	78	19	28	47	28

=== International ===
Year	Team	Event	Result	GP	G	A	Pts	PIM
2009	Germany	OGQ	Q	3	1	1	2	0
2009	Germany	WC	15th	6	0	0	0	0
2010	Germany	OG	11th	4	0	0	0	2
Senior totals				13	1	1	2	2
