= Andreas Falk =

Swedish professional ice hockey player

- Born: February 27, 1983 (age 42); Huddinge, Sweden
- Height: 5 ft 10 in (178 cm)
- Weight: 183 lb (83 kg; 13 st 1 lb)
- Position: Centre
- Shot: Left
- Played for: HV71; Kölner Haie; Luleå HF
- Playing career: 2002–2019

Andreas Falk (born February 27, 1983) is a Swedish former professional ice hockey player, who played in the Swedish Hockey League (SHL). He currently serves as an assistant coach in the SHL with former club, Skellefteå AIK.

== Playing career ==
Falk started his active playing career in 1999 with Huddinge IK youth section. In 2001 he played with the senior team in the Swedish tier two league HockeyAllsvenskan. After two seasons with Huddinge he changed to fellow HockeyAllsvenskan team, Skellefteå AIK. For season 2006–2007 he signed with the Elitserien team HV71 and contributed in winning the Swedish Championship in 2008 with the team.

In 2012, Falk signed with Kölner Haie of the Deutsche Eishockey Liga (DEL) in Germany. He stayed until the end of the 2015–16 campaign before on April 30, 2016, he penned a two-year deal with Luleå HF of the SHL.

== Career statistics ==
=== Regular season and playoffs ===
			Regular season					Playoffs
Season	Team	League	GP	G	A	Pts	PIM	GP	G	A	Pts	PIM
2001–02	Huddinge IK	Allsv	3	0	0	0	4	—	—	—	—	—
2002–03	Huddinge IK	Allsv	38	18	13	31	122	2	0	0	0	25
2003–04	Huddinge IK	Allsv	43	14	12	26	108	—	—	—	—	—
2004–05	Skellefteå AIK	Allsv	32	6	13	19	38	—	—	—	—	—
2005–06	Skellefteå AIK	Allsv	42	8	14	22	60	10	1	3	4	24
2006–07	HV71	SEL	55	6	8	14	63	14	4	2	6	35
2007–08	HV71	SEL	55	2	10	12	81	17	4	2	6	12
2008–09	HV71	SEL	55	10	8	18	90	18	4	7	11	16
2009–10	HV71	SEL	55	13	12	25	62	16	3	3	6	22
2010–11	HV71	SEL	55	9	20	29	56	3	1	0	1	31
2011–12	HV71	SEL	54	7	20	27	72	6	0	3	3	6
2012–13	Kölner Haie	DEL	50	3	27	30	52	12	3	5	8	6
2013–14	Kölner Haie	DEL	50	13	19	32	46	17	3	4	7	34
2014–15	Kölner Haie	DEL	49	3	14	17	82	—	—	—	—	—
2015–16	Kölner Haie	DEL	49	6	8	14	68	15	3	3	6	6
2016–17	Luleå HF	SHL	49	4	14	18	53	2	0	1	1	0
2017–18	Luleå HF	SHL	52	2	10	12	28	3	0	0	0	2
2018–19	HV71	SHL	6	0	0	0	0	—	—	—	—	—
SHL totals			436	53	102	155	505	79	16	18	34	124
DEL totals			198	25	68	93	248	44	9	12	21	46

=== International ===
Year	Team	Event	Result	GP	G	A	Pts	PIM
2003	Sweden	WJC	8th	6	0	4	4	10
Junior totals				6	0	4	4	10

== Awards ==
- Elitserien playoff winner with HV71 in 2008.
- Elitserien playoff silver medal with HV71 in 2009.
