= Tyson Mulock =

Canadian-German ice hockey player (born 1981)

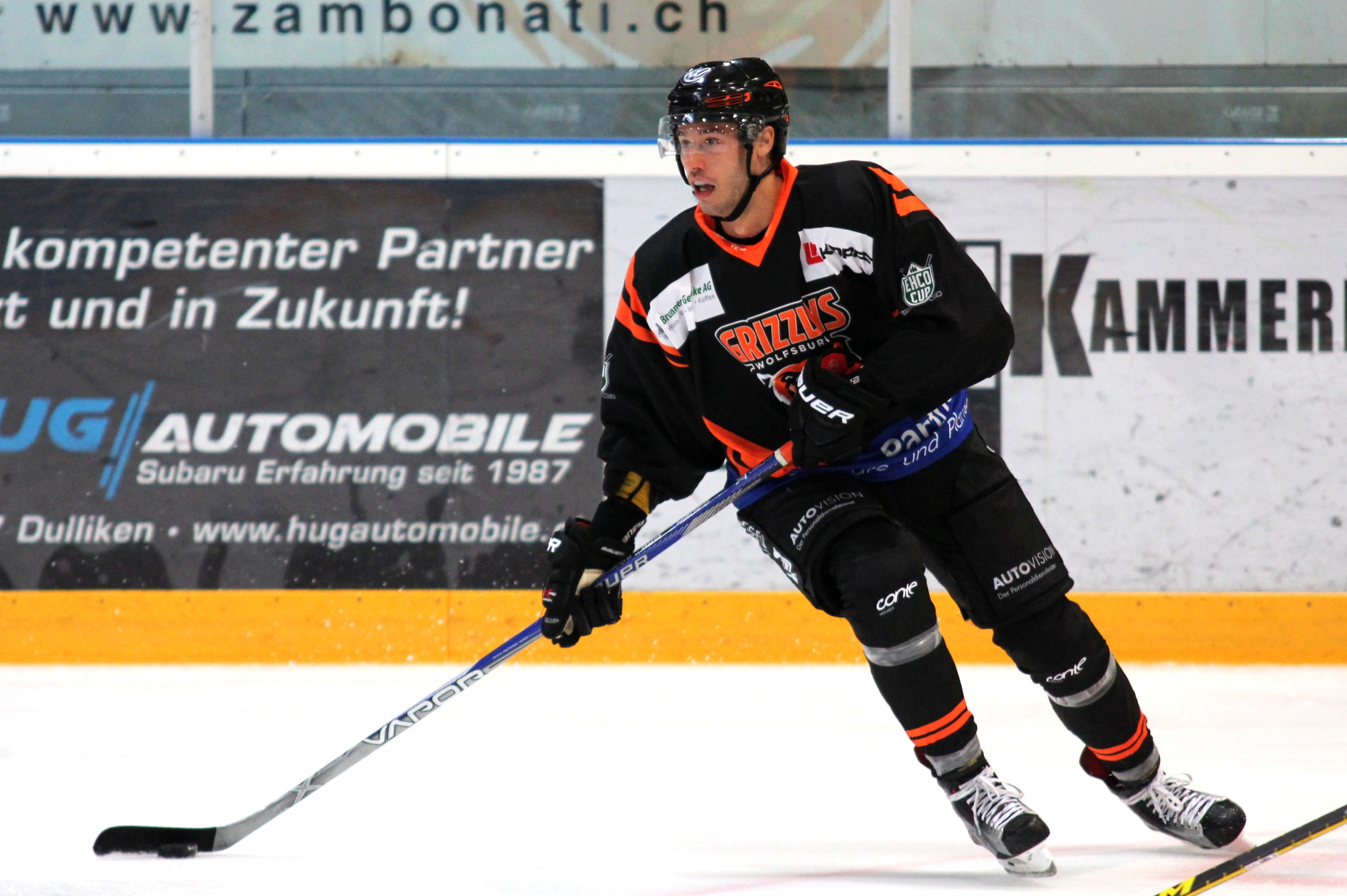
- Born: January 22, 1981 (age 45) North Delta, British Columbia, Canada
- Height: 5 ft 8 in (173 cm)
- Weight: 170 lb (77 kg; 12 st 2 lb)
- Position: Centre
- Shoots: Right
- DEL team Former teams: Free Agent; Eisbären Berlin; Iserlohn Roosters; Grizzlys Wolfsburg
- NHL draft: Undrafted
- Playing career: 2004–present

Tyson Mulock (born January 22,1981) is a Canadian-German professional ice hockey centre who is currently an unrestricted free agent who most recently played for the Grizzlys Wolfsburg of the Deutsche Eishockey Liga (DEL). Mulocks holds a German passport, his grandfather emigrated to Canada after World War II. Tyson's brother T.J. Mulock also plays professionally.

== Playing career ==
Mulock played major junior in the Western Hockey League (WHL) for four seasons with the Medicine Hat Tigers and Regina Pats, beginning in 1999–2000. After a major junior career-high 51 points in 72 games with the Pats in 2002–03, Mulock moved to the Junior A British Columbia Hockey League (BCHL) to play one season with the Nanaimo Clippers. He scored a team-high 89 points in 59 games with the Clippers, helping lead them to a Fred Page Cup in 2004 as BCHL champions with an additional 36 points in 25 playoff games.

Undrafted by an NHL club, Mulock went overseas to Germany to play in the third-tier Oberliga (ObL) with SC Mittelrhein-Neuwied and SC Riessersee. After two seasons in the Oberliga, Mulock moved up to the 2nd Bundesliga (DEL2) where he scored a league-high 101 points with the Essen Mosquitoes. In 2007–08, he signed with the Eisbären Berlin of the top-tier Deutsche Eishockey Liga (DEL).

On April 30, 2013, Mulock left Berlin as a free agent after six seasons, and signed a one-year contract to remain in Germany with the Iserlohn Roosters. After one season with the Roosters, he moved on to fellow DEL side Grizzly Adams Wolfsburg. In January 2016, Mulock signed a contract extension that kept him in Wolfsburg until 2018.

== Career statistics ==
			Regular season					Playoffs
Season	Team	League	GP	G	A	Pts	PIM	GP	G	A	Pts	PIM
1999–00	Medicine Hat Tigers	WHL	59	11	15	26	14	—	—	—	—	—
2000–01	Medicine Hat Tigers	WHL	63	13	21	34	16	—	—	—	—	—
2001–02	Vancouver Giants	WHL	18	2	4	6	9	—	—	—	—	—
2001–02	Regina Pats	WHL	47	14	21	35	23	6	1	3	4	2
2002–03	Regina Pats	WHL	72	19	32	51	42	5	0	2	2	6
2003–04	Nanaimo Clippers	BCHL	59	39	50	89	84	24	17	15	32	28
2004–05	SC Mittelrhein-Neuwied	Germany3	43	31	33	64	66	4	1	1	2	6
2005–06	SC Riessersee	Germany3	50	50	45	95	87	1	3	0	3	0
2006–07	Moskitos Essen	Germany2	52	50	50	100	52	4	2	1	3	8
2007–08	Eisbären Berlin	DEL	56	18	19	37	18	14	2	3	5	0
2008–09	Eisbären Berlin	DEL	52	14	18	32	14	12	4	7	11	6
2009–10	Eisbären Berlin	DEL	55	15	18	33	47	5	0	0	0	0
2010–11	Eisbären Berlin	DEL	39	2	14	16	20	12	2	2	4	4
2011–12	Eisbären Berlin	DEL	47	6	10	16	10	13	2	0	2	2
2012–13	Eisbären Berlin	DEL	51	8	11	19	57	13	2	2	4	12
2013–14	Iserlohn Roosters	DEL	48	16	17	33	12	9	0	5	5	2
2014–15	Grizzly Adams Wolfsburg	DEL	48	11	14	25	33	11	1	8	9	2
2015–16	Grizzly Wolfsburg	DEL	42	10	10	20	4	15	1	1	2	25
2016–17	Grizzly Wolfsburg	DEL	50	4	7	11	10	18	3	4	7	12
2017–18	Grizzly Wolfsburg	DEL	52	6	5	11	6	7	2	1	3	2
DEL totals			540	110	143	253	231	129	19	33	52	67
