= John Laliberte =

American ice hockey player (born 1983)

- Born: August 5, 1983 (age 42) Saco, Maine, U.S.
- Height: 6 ft 2 in (188 cm)
- Weight: 190 lb (86 kg; 13 st 8 lb)
- Position: Left wing
- Shot: left
- Played for: Worcester Sharks; Milwaukee Admirals; Odense Bulldogs; EHC Wolfsburg; ERC Ingolstadt
- NHL draft: 114th overall, 2002; Vancouver Canucks
- Playing career: 2006–2018

John Laliberte (born August 5, 1983) is an American former professional ice hockey Winger. He most notably played for EHC Wolfsburg and ERC Ingolstadt in the Deutsche Eishockey Liga (DEL). He was selected by the Vancouver Canucks in the 4th round (114th overall) of the 2002 NHL entry draft.

== Playing career ==
Laliberte played collegiate hockey for the Boston University Terriers of the Hockey East.

Unsigned from the Canucks, Laliberte played in the American Hockey League with the Worcester Sharks and Milwaukee Admirals before pursuing a European career. After a season in Denmark playing for the Odense Bulldogs of the then AL-Bank Ligaen, Laliberte transferred to the German DEL, signing with the Grizzly Adams Wolfsburg.

After three seasons with the Grizzlys, Laliberte signed a contract with fellow German club, ERC Ingolstadt on May 18, 2012. During the 2013–14 season, on December 14, 2013, Laliberte was signed to a three-year contract extension to remain in Ingolstadt.

Laliberte, who agreed on another one-year contract in Ingolstadt until 2018, has been named twice as captain of the team. Due to his constance in scoring, Laliberte has become one of the topscorers of ERC Ingolstadt's history.

At the conclusion of the 2017–18 season, Laliberte opted to end his contract early and announce his retirement from professional hockey after 12 seasons.

== Personal ==
Laliberte and his wife, Candice, have two children. He lives in Portland, Maine and accepted a new career in a property development post playing career.

== Career statistics ==
			Regular season					Playoffs
Season	Team	League	GP	G	A	Pts	PIM	GP	G	A	Pts	PIM
2000–01	Exeter Snow Devils	EJHL	53	33	42	75	42	—	—	—	—	—
2001–02	New Hampshire Jr. Monarchs	EJHL	35	39	44	83	60	—	—	—	—	—
2002–03	Boston University	HE	26	5	6	11	12	—	—	—	—	—
2003–04	Boston University	HE	35	5	11	16	20	—	—	—	—	—
2004–05	Boston University	HE	40	12	18	30	45	—	—	—	—	—
2005–06	Boston University	HE	33	11	21	32	28	—	—	—	—	—
2006–07	Trenton Titans	ECHL	30	14	13	27	26	—	—	—	—	—
2006–07	Worcester Sharks	AHL	9	0	1	1	2	—	—	—	—	—
2006–07	Milwaukee Admirals	AHL	27	3	7	10	4	4	0	0	0	0
2007–08	Augusta Lynx	ECHL	29	15	13	28	37	—	—	—	—	—
2007–08	Milwaukee Admirals	AHL	43	4	10	14	25	6	1	0	1	4
2008–09	Odense Bulldogs	DEN	44	29	28	57	50	11	8	7	15	8
2009–10	Grizzly Adams Wolfsburg	DEL	56	28	29	57	22	7	4	3	7	8
2010–11	Grizzly Adams Wolfsburg	DEL	48	21	27	48	69	9	5	6	11	12
2011–12	Grizzly Adams Wolfsburg	DEL	52	17	31	48	34	3	1	0	1	4
2012–13	ERC Ingolstadt	DEL	48	19	20	39	36	6	0	2	2	6
2013–14	ERC Ingolstadt	DEL	49	22	19	41	53	21	7	8	15	14
2014–15	ERC Ingolstadt	DEL	40	22	8	30	60	18	6	5	11	14
2015–16	ERC Ingolstadt	DEL	46	16	26	42	63	2	1	0	1	0
2016–17	ERC Ingolstadt	DEL	24	13	15	28	18	2	1	1	2	8
2017–18	ERC Ingolstadt	DEL	52	13	17	30	48	5	2	5	7	2
AHL totals			79	7	18	25	31	10	1	0	1	4
DEL totals			415	171	192	363	403	73	27	30	57	68
