= Dušan Frosch =

Czech ice hockey player

Dusan Frosch
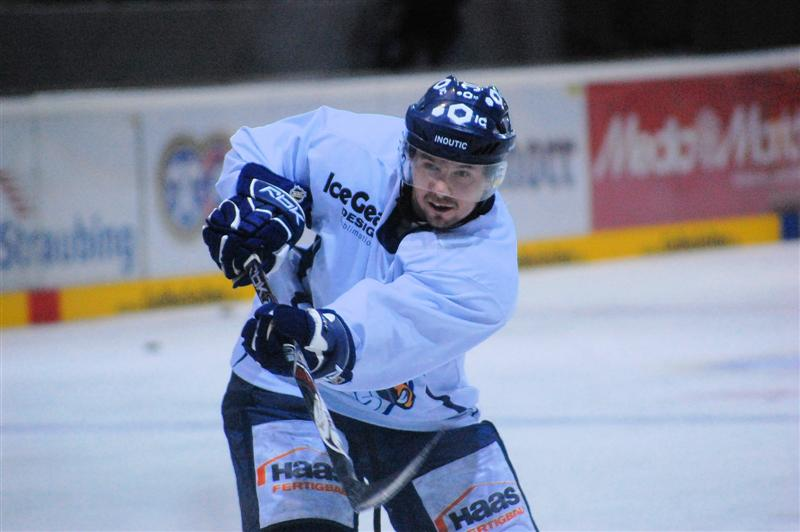
- Born: 8 May 1981 (age 45) Hradec Králové, Czechoslovakia
- Height: 5 ft 9 in (175 cm)
- Weight: 168 lb (76 kg; 12 st 0 lb)
- Position: Right wing
- Shoots: Left
- team Former teams: Free agent HC Oceláři Třinec; Wölfe Freiburg; Straubing Tigers; Kölner Haie; Thomas Sabo Ice Tigers; Iserlohn Roosters
- NHL draft: Undrafted
- Playing career: 2000–present

Dušan Frosch (born 8 May 1981 in Hradec Králové) is a Czech professional ice hockey player. He is currently an unrestricted free agent having last played for Starbulls Rosenheim in the German Oberliga.

Frosch previously played in the Deutsche Eishockey Liga for Wölfe Freiburg, Straubing Tigers, Kölner Haie, Thomas Sabo Ice Tigers and Iserlohn Roosters. He also played eleven games in the Czech Extraliga for HC Oceláři Třinec.

== Career statistics ==
			Regular season					Playoffs
Season	Team	League	GP	G	A	Pts	PIM	GP	G	A	Pts	PIM
1999–00	HC Oceláři Třinec U20	Czech U20	37	5	15	20	24	2	0	0	0	0
1999–00	HC Oceláři Třinec	Czech	1	0	0	0	0	—	—	—	—	—
2000–01	HC Oceláři Třinec U20	Czech U20	45	20	27	47	72	2	0	1	1	2
2000–01	HC Oceláři Třinec	Czech	2	0	1	1	4	—	—	—	—	—
2000–01	TJ Nový Jičín	Czech3	7	2	3	5	6	6	1	3	4	4
2001–02	HC Oceláři Třinec U20	Czech U20	17	14	16	30	28	—	—	—	—	—
2001–02	HC Oceláři Třinec	Czech	8	1	0	1	18	—	—	—	—	—
2001–02	HC Šumperští Draci	Czech2	20	2	4	6	45	—	—	—	—	—
2002–03	HC Hradec Králové	Czech2	39	15	13	28	36	—	—	—	—	—
2003–04	Wölfe Freiburg	DEL	31	1	6	7	6	—	—	—	—	—
2003–04	Blue Devils Weiden	Germany2	3	0	2	2	10	—	—	—	—	—
2004–05	SERC Wild Wings	Germany2	51	14	26	40	44	7	2	1	3	2
2005–06	SERC Wild Wings	Germany2	48	20	38	58	67	10	2	3	5	35
2006–07	SERC Wild Wings	Germany2	44	22	39	61	62	5	0	2	2	12
2007–08	SERC Wild Wings	Germany2	52	33	42	75	46	11	3	5	8	28
2008–09	Straubing Tigers	DEL	51	9	21	30	40	—	—	—	—	—
2009–10	Kölner Haie	DEL	56	13	26	39	50	3	0	0	0	2
2010–11	Nürnberg Ice Tigers	DEL	48	6	25	31	82	2	1	1	2	2
2011–12	Nürnberg Ice Tigers	DEL	45	4	12	16	20	—	—	—	—	—
2012–13	Nürnberg Ice Tigers	DEL	52	6	28	34	22	3	0	0	0	0
2013–14	Iserlohn Roosters	DEL	49	5	9	14	26	9	0	1	1	0
2014–15	EC Bad Nauheim	DEL2	52	23	31	54	62	—	—	—	—	—
2015–16	EC Bad Nauheim	DEL2	48	19	36	55	78	5	0	2	2	10
2016–17	EC Bad Nauheim	DEL2	42	11	19	30	32	—	—	—	—	—
2017–18	EC Bad Nauheim	DEL2	47	11	14	25	36	5	1	2	3	8
2018–19	Starbulls Rosenheim	Germany3	48	13	44	57	46	8	1	1	2	14
2019–20	TEV Miesbach	Germany4	24	7	31	38	24	—	—	—	—	—
2020–21	TEV Miesbach	Germany4	9	6	9	15	10	—	—	—	—	—
2021–22	TEV Miesbach	Germany4	20	0	22	22	20	—	—	—	—	—
Czech totals			11	1	1	2	22	—	—	—	—	—
DEL totals			332	44	127	171	246	17	1	2	3	4
Czech2 totals			59	17	17	34	81	—	—	—	—	—
DEL2 totals			189	64	100	164	208	10	1	4	5	18
