= Brent Raedeke =

Canadian-German ice hockey player

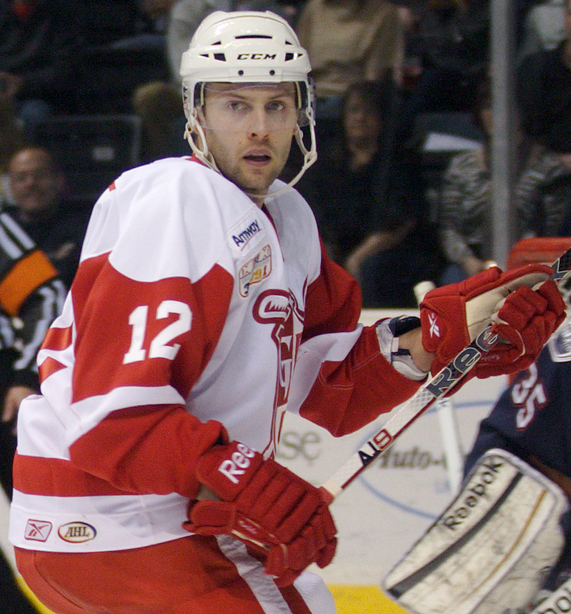
- Raedeke with the Grand Rapids Griffins in 2011
- Born: May 29, 1990 (age 36) Regina, Saskatchewan, Canada
- Height: 6 ft 0 in (183 cm)
- Weight: 190 lb (86 kg; 13 st 8 lb)
- Position: Left wing
- Shoots: Left
- DEL2 team Former teams: EC Bad Nauheim; Grand Rapids Griffins; Iserlohn Roosters; Adler Mannheim
- National team: Germany
- NHL draft: Undrafted
- Playing career: 2009–present

Brent Raedeke (born May 29, 1990) is a German-Canadian professional ice hockey player who is currently playing center for EC Bad Nauheim of the DEL2.

== Playing career ==
He previously played with the Grand Rapids Griffins in the American Hockey League while under contract to the Detroit Red Wings of the National Hockey League. On July 24, 2013, Raedeke left the Red Wings organization after helping the Griffins claim the Calder Cup, and signed a one-year deal as a free agent with the Iserlohn Roosters of the DEL.

On April 30, 2015, after two seasons with the Roosters, Raedeke signed with fellow DEL competitors Adler Mannheim on a two-year contract.

Raedeke played five seasons in Mannheim, in winning the league in the 2018–19 season, before leaving as a free agent following the COVID-19 pandemic affected 2019–20 season.

On August 7, 2020, Raedeke returned to his original German club, the Iserlohn Roosters, in signing a one-year contract.

Following the 2022–23 season, with Iserlohn missing the playoffs for the second consecutive year, Raedeke left the club at the conclusion of his contract on March 10, 2023.

== Career statistics ==
=== Regular season and playoffs ===
| | | | Regular season | | | | | Playoffs |
| Season | Team | League | GP | G | A | Pts | PIM | GP | G | A | Pts | PIM |
|---|---|---|---|---|---|---|---|---|---|---|---|---|
| 2007–08 | Edmonton Oil Kings | WHL | 72 | 15 | 16 | 31 | 62 | — | — | — | — | — |
| 2008–09 | Edmonton Oil Kings | WHL | 70 | 19 | 36 | 55 | 80 | 4 | 1 | 1 | 2 | 6 |
| 2008–09 | Grand Rapids Griffins | AHL | 2 | 0 | 0 | 0 | 0 | — | — | — | — | — |
| 2009–10 | Edmonton Oil Kings | WHL | 39 | 16 | 15 | 31 | 60 | — | — | — | — | — |
| 2009–10 | Brandon Wheat Kings | WHL | 33 | 7 | 18 | 25 | 35 | 15 | 5 | 7 | 12 | 16 |
| 2010–11 | Grand Rapids Griffins | AHL | 67 | 8 | 5 | 13 | 17 | — | — | — | — | — |
| 2011–12 | Grand Rapids Griffins | AHL | 64 | 11 | 10 | 21 | 33 | — | — | — | — | — |
| 2012–13 | Grand Rapids Griffins | AHL | 38 | 3 | 6 | 9 | 43 | — | — | — | — | — |
| 2013–14 | Iserlohn Roosters | DEL | 51 | 18 | 22 | 40 | 50 | 8 | 2 | 2 | 4 | 6 |
| 2014–15 | Iserlohn Roosters | DEL | 52 | 13 | 23 | 36 | 62 | 7 | 2 | 1 | 3 | 10 |
| 2015–16 | Adler Mannheim | DEL | 34 | 3 | 2 | 5 | 78 | 2 | 0 | 1 | 1 | 0 |
| 2016–17 | Adler Mannheim | DEL | 52 | 16 | 17 | 33 | 34 | 7 | 1 | 0 | 1 | 4 |
| 2017–18 | Adler Mannheim | DEL | 34 | 7 | 6 | 13 | 10 | 10 | 1 | 2 | 3 | 4 |
| 2018–19 | Adler Mannheim | DEL | 22 | 4 | 3 | 7 | 33 | 4 | 0 | 0 | 0 | 2 |
| 2019–20 | Adler Mannheim | DEL | 36 | 5 | 2 | 7 | 12 | — | — | — | — | — |
| 2020–21 | Iserlohn Roosters | DEL | 36 | 6 | 6 | 12 | 24 | 3 | 1 | 0 | 1 | 2 |
| 2021–22 | Iserlohn Roosters | DEL | 41 | 6 | 7 | 13 | 24 | — | — | — | — | — |
| 2022–23 | Iserlohn Roosters | DEL | 53 | 3 | 11 | 14 | 26 | — | — | — | — | — |
| 2023–24 | EC Bad Nauheim | DEL2 | 36 | 11 | 15 | 26 | 34 | 2 | 0 | 1 | 1 | 2 |
| AHL totals | | | 171 | 22 | 21 | 43 | 93 | — | — | — | — | — |

=== International ===
| Year | Team | Event | Result | GP | G | A | Pts | PIM |
|---|---|---|---|---|---|---|---|---|
| 2015 | Germany | WC | 10th | 7 | 0 | 0 | 0 | 0 |
| Senior totals | | | | 7 | 0 | 0 | 0 | 0 |

== Awards and honours ==
| Award | Year |
|---|---|
DEL
| Champion (Adler Mannheim) | 2019 |
