= Björn Barta =

German ice hockey player

- Born: May 22, 1980 (age 45) Berlin, Germany
- Height: 1.72 m (5 ft 8 in)
- Weight: 75 kg (165 lb; 11 st 11 lb)
- Position: Left wing
- Shoots: Left
- Oberliga team Former teams: Füchse Duisburg; Kölner Haie; Augsburger Panther; Thomas Sabo Ice Tigers; ERC Ingolstadt
- National team: Germany
- Playing career: 1998–present

Björn Barta (born May 22, 1980 in Berlin) is a German professional ice hockey player. He is currently playing for Füchse Duisburg of the third-tier German Oberliga. He previously played with ERC Ingolstadt of the Deutsche Eishockey Liga (DEL). He re-joined the Panthers from fellow DEL club, the Thomas Sabo Ice Tigers.

== Playing career ==
Barta grew up in West Berlin, skating from the age of three, joined at the age of five with junior club Berlin Schlittschuhclub. Due to the better prospects, he moved as a 13-year-old to the youth section of the Eisbären Berlin. At the age of 17 years, Barta went to the Swedish junior league for Mora IK. After one year, he returned to Germany and signed a contract with the Heilbronner EC. He played as a winger for two years in the 2nd Bundesliga, where he developed into one of the top performers on the team.

In the 2000–01 season, Barta transferred to the league rivals SC Bietigheim-Bissingen on the ice. One year later, he accepted an offer from Kölner Haie and made his debut appearances in the Deutsche Eishockey Liga. First, Barta was loaned to its affiliate partner EV Duisburg, but during the season, he established himself as a winger in the fourth row of the Sharks. At the end of the season, the Berliners celebrated the German championship. However, to get more ice time, he moved to the Augsburger Panther, for whom he played three years. Since the season 2005–06, the attacker played at ERC Ingolstadt, with whom he in the first two years play-offs reached there but was eliminated each case in the quarterfinals. For the 2007–08 season, he signed a contract with league rivals Thomas Sabo Ice Tigers, where he fulfilled his contract until 2012.

Since the 2012–13 season, he returned to play again for ERC Ingolstadt.
