= Derek Hahn =

Canadian ice hockey player

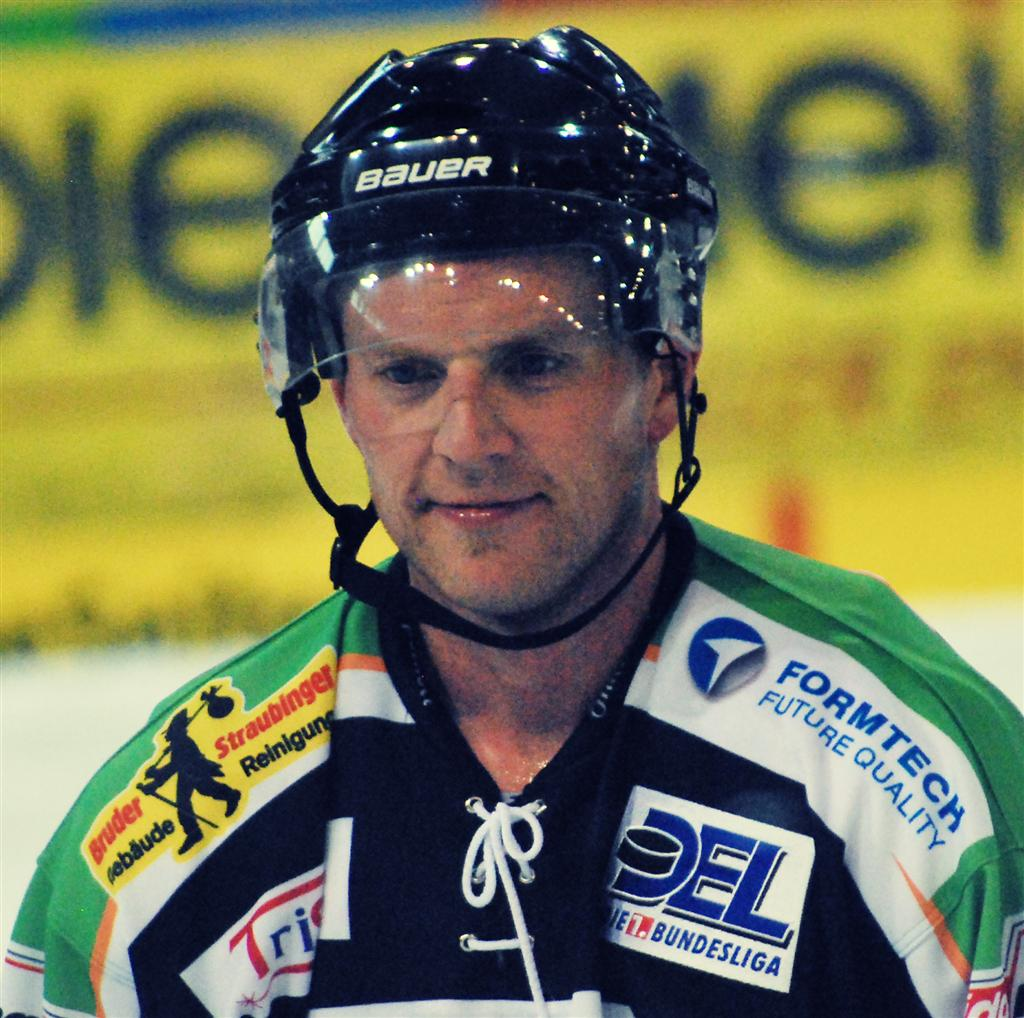
- Born: December 27, 1977 (age 48) Elmira, Ontario, Canada
- Height: 6 ft 0 in (183 cm)
- Weight: 185 lb (84 kg; 13 st 3 lb)
- Position: Centre
- Shot: Right
- Played for: Amarillo Gorillas; Rødovre Mighty Bulls; Frankfurt Lions; Straubing Tigers; ERC Ingolstadt; HC TWK Innsbruck
- NHL draft: Undrafted
- Playing career: 2001–2016

Derek Hahn (born December 27, 1977) is a Canadian former professional ice hockey forward.

== Playing career ==
After playing collegiate hockey with the R.I.T. Tigers, Hahn made his professional debut with the Elmira Jackals in the United Hockey League. After five seasons in the Central Hockey League as a cult player with the Amarillo Gorillas, Hahn embarked on a European career, signing initially in the AL-Bank Ligaen with the Rødovre Mighty Bulls.

Hahn established himself in the Deutsche Eishockey Liga as an offensive force, playing eight seasons with the Frankfurt Lions, Straubing Tigers, and ERC Ingolstadt. In 2014, he helped Ingolstadt capture the German championship, tallying 46 points (12 goals, 34 assists) in 52 games throughout the season. On June 9, 2015, Hahn left Germany, to sign in the neighbouring Austrian League, with HC TWK Innsbruck of the EBEL on a one-year deal.

== Awards and honours ==
Award	Year
CHL Rookie of the Year	2002–03
CHL Most Valuable Player	2006–07
