= Daniel Richmond =

British conservationist and Jamaican cricketer

Sir Robert Daniel Richmond CIE
- Born: 29 October 1878; Jamaica
- Died: 1 May 1948 (aged 69)
- Occupation: Conservationist
- Known for: Chief Conservator of Forests in India

Sir Robert Daniel Richmond CIE (29 October 1878 – 1 May 1948) was Chief Conservator of Forests in India and played cricket for Jamaica.

== Early life and career ==
Richmond was born on 29 October 1878, the son of J Richmond CMG JP. He was educated at Bedford Modern School.

Richmond entered the Indian Forest Service in 1898. After training in England and Germany he joined the service in Madras (1901) becoming District Forest Officer (1903), Principal of the Madras Forest College (1913), and Assistant Inspector-General of Forests to the Government of India (1919–22). He became Conservator of Forests (1923), a Member of the Madras Legislative Council (1923), Chief Conservative of Forests Madras (1927) and retired from the Indian Forest Service in 1932. After retirement he was appointed to the Madras Public Service Commission becoming its Chairman (1935–40).

Richmond was made a Knight Bachelor in 1936 and a Companion of the Order of the Indian Empire in 1932.

== International cricket ==
Richmond played Cricket for Jamaica (where he had been born) and became President of the Madras Cricket Club.

== Family life ==
In 1909 Richmond married Monica, daughter of Sir James Davy KCB. They had one son. Richmond died on 1 May 1948.
