= Dimitrij Kotschnew =

Kazakhstani-born German ice hockey player

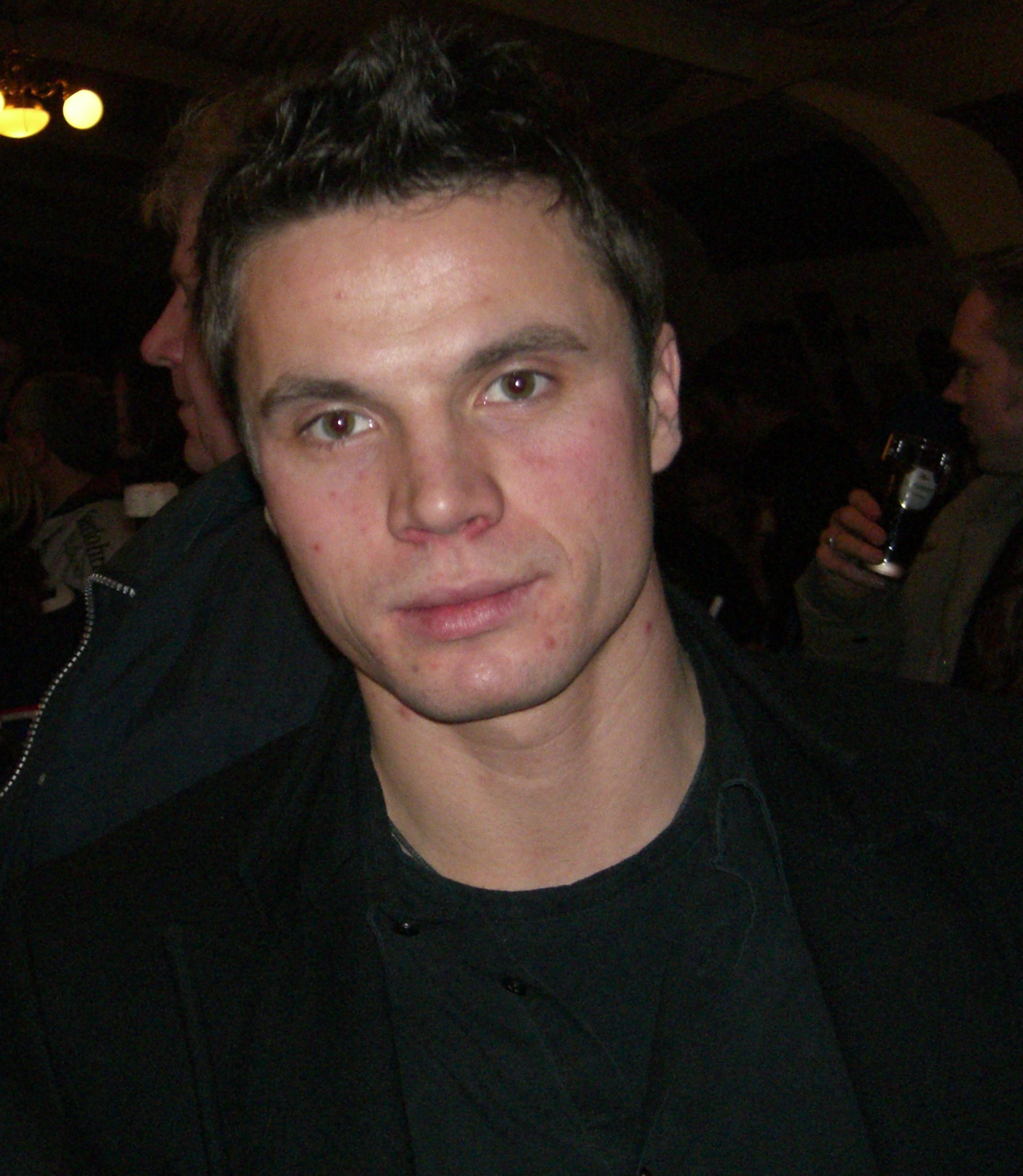
- Kotschnew in 2006
- Born: July 15, 1981 (age 44); Karaganda, Kazakh SSR, Soviet Union
- Height: 1.83 m (6 ft 0 in)
- Weight: 80 kg (176 lb; 12 st 8 lb)
- Position: Goaltender
- Caught: Left
- Played for: Iserlohn Roosters; Nürnberg Ice Tigers; HC Spartak Moscow; Lokomotiv Yaroslavl; Atlant Moscow Oblast; Hamburg Freezers
- National team: Germany
- Playing career: 2000–2016

Dimitrij Alexandrowitsch Kotschnew (Russian: Дмитрий Александрович Кочнев; born July 15, 1981) is a Kazakhstani-born German former professional ice hockey goaltender.

Kotschnew played six seasons for the Iserlohn Roosters over two spells. From 2004 to 2007, he served as their starting goaltender. He has also played in the Kontinental Hockey League. He returned to Germany in 2012, signing for the Hamburg Freezers.

Kotschnew has also played internationally for the German national team.

== Personal life ==
Kotschnew was born in Kazakhstan, however moved to Germany when he was nine years old. Due to his Russian German descent he also holds Russian citizenship.
