= Tim Hambly =

American ice hockey player (born 1983)

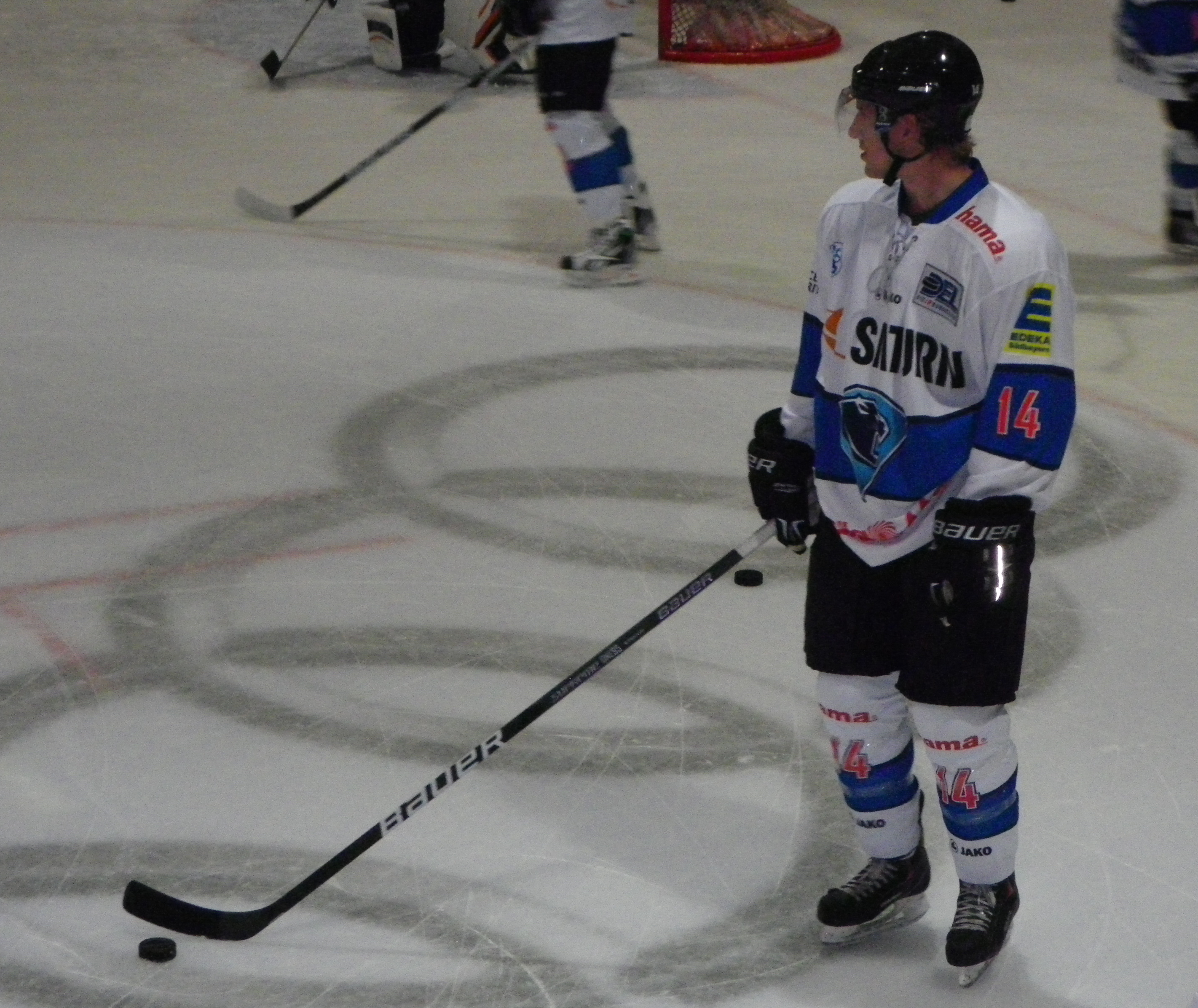
- Born: June 26, 1983 (age 43) White Bear Lake, Minnesota, U.S.
- Height: 6 ft 0 in (183 cm)
- Weight: 190 lb (86 kg; 13 st 8 lb)
- Position: Defense
- Shoots: Left
- DEL team Former teams: Free Agent; Iowa Stars; Omaha Ak-Sar-Ben Knights; Quad City Flames; Rockford IceHogs; ERC Ingolstadt; Grizzlys Wolfsburg; Krefeld Pinguine
- NHL draft: Undrafted
- Playing career: 2005–present

Tim Hambly (born June 26, 1983) is an American ice hockey defenseman. He is currently a free agent, having last played for the Krefeld Pinguine in Germany's Deutsche Eishockey Liga (DEL).

== Playing career ==
Hambly enrolled at the University of Minnesota Duluth in 2001, where he played collegiate hockey for the Bulldogs for four seasons until 2005. During his NCAA career, he appeared in 141 games, contributing 13 goals and 47 assists. In his junior year, Hambly played a key role in one of the program's most successful seasons, helping guide the Bulldogs to the prestigious Frozen Four.

Hambly began his professional ice hockey career in the 2004–05 season with the Las Vegas Wranglers of the East Coast Hockey League, appearing in a total of 39 games over two seasons with the team. During the 2005–06 campaign, he advanced to the American Hockey League (AHL), where he played for both the Iowa Stars and the Omaha Ak-Sar-Ben Knights. He went on to spend three additional seasons in the AHL before making the move to Europe. In 2009–10, Hambly signed with ERC Ingolstadt of the Deutsche Eishockey Liga (DEL), Germany's premier hockey league, and stayed with the team through the 2013–14 season. In his final year with Ingolstadt, he served as an assistant captain and played a key role in helping the club win the DEL championship.

In the 2014–15 season, Hambly continued his career in the DEL by signing with Grizzly Adams Wolfsburg. His performance during that season earned him a contract extension, allowing him to remain with the team for the 2015–16 campaign.
