= Marcel Ohmann =

German ice hockey player

- Born: April 4, 1991 (age 34) Neuss, Germany
- Height: 5 ft 11 in (180 cm)
- Weight: 185 lb (84 kg; 13 st 3 lb)
- Position: Left wing
- Shoots: Left
- DEL team Former teams: Free Agent; Kölner Haie; Grizzlys Wolfsburg
- Playing career: 2009–present

Marcel Ohmann (born April 4, 1991) is a German professional ice hockey player. He is currently an unrestricted free agent who most recently played for the Grizzlys Wolfsburg of the Deutsche Eishockey Liga (DEL).

Ohmaan previously played 8 seasons with Kölner Haie in the DEL. As a free agent following the 2016–17 season, Ohmann left Cologne after 8 professional years, signing a one-year deal with fellow German club, Grizzlys Wolfsburg on May 10, 2017.

After concluding his second season with the Grizzlys in 2018–19, Ohmann opted to leave as a free agent on March 8, 2019.
