= Alexander Oblinger =

German ice hockey player

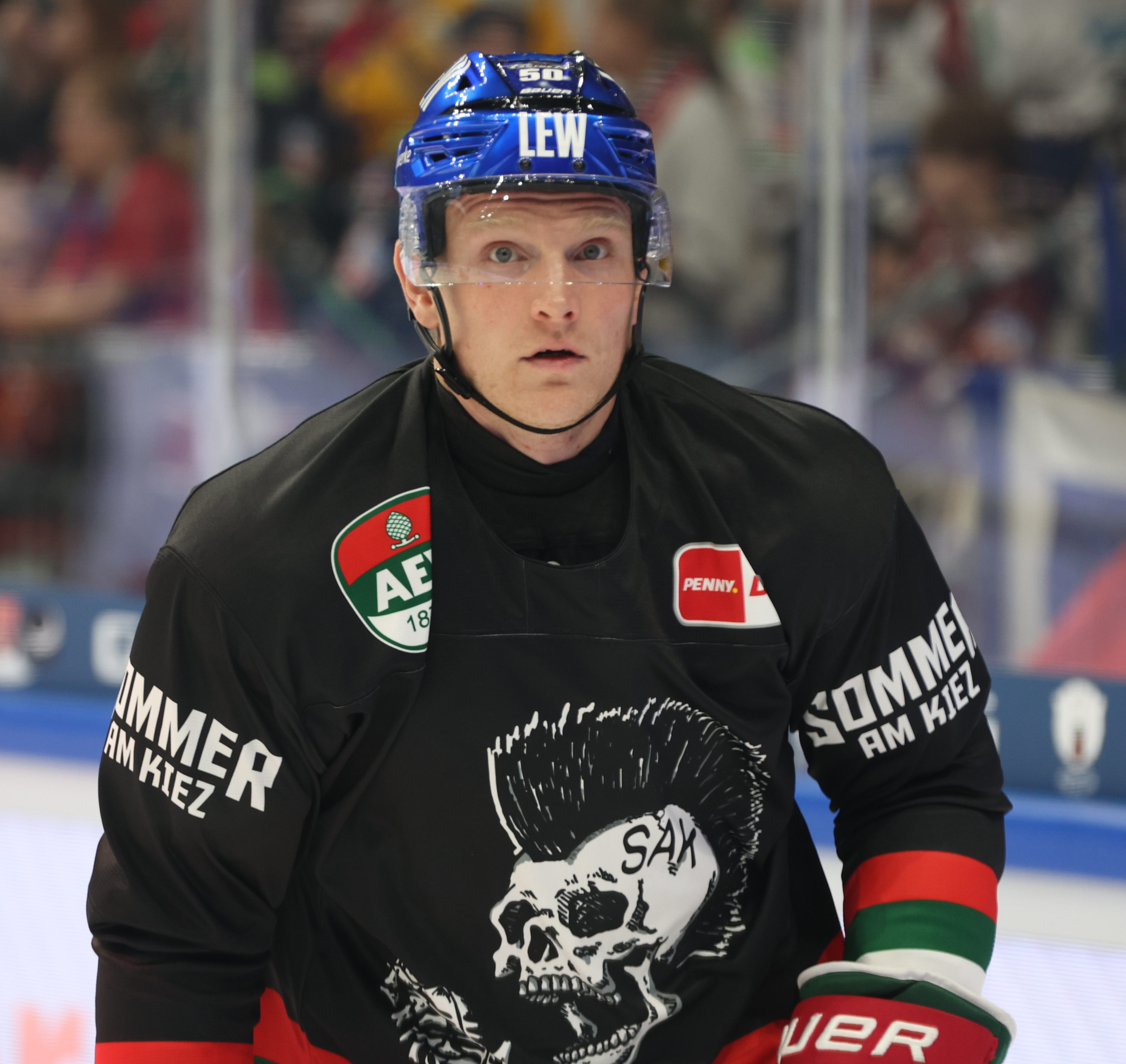
- Alexander Oblinger in 2024
- Born: January 17, 1989 (age 37) Augsburg, Germany
- Height: 6 ft 3 in (191 cm)
- Weight: 216 lb (98 kg; 15 st 6 lb)
- Position: Right wing
- Shoots: Right
- DEL team Former teams: Free agent Eisbären Berlin; Thomas Sabo Ice Tigers; ERC Ingolstadt; Straubing Tigers; Kölner Haie; Augsburger Panther
- Playing career: 2009–present

Alexander Oblinger (born January 17, 1989) is a German professional ice hockey player. He is currently an unrestricted free agent who most recently played for Augsburger Panther in the Deutsche Eishockey Liga (DEL). He formerly played with Eisbären Berlin, Thomas Sabo Ice Tigers and ERC Ingolstadt before joining the Straubing Tigers on a one-year contract on April 17, 2016.

After two seasons with the Tigers, Oblinger left as a free agent to sign a one-year deal with Kölner Haie on April 11, 2018.
