= Philip Riefers =

German ice hockey player

- Born: March 15, 1990 (age 35) Krefeld, West Germany
- Height: 6 ft 3 in (191 cm)
- Weight: 192 lb (87 kg; 13 st 10 lb)
- Position: Right wing
- Shoots: Right
- DEL2 team Former teams: Krefeld Pinguine; Kölner Haie; Augsburger Panther; Adler Mannheim; Grizzlys Wolfsburg; Iserlohn Roosters
- Playing career: 2008–present

Philip Riefers (born March 15, 1990) is a German professional ice hockey player. He is currently playing for Krefeld Pinguine in the DEL2.

== Playing career ==
He formerly joined Kölner Haie after his first stint with Krefeld Pinguine in the Deutsche Eishockey Liga (DEL) in 2011. After finishing the 2014–15 season with Augsburger Panther on April 30, 2015, Riefers signed a two-year contract with fellow German club, Adler Mannheim.

In his only season in Mannheim, Riefers appeared scoreless in 33 games for the 2015–16 campaign. On May 30, 2016, Riefers left Mannheim out of contract to sign a one-year deal with EHC Wolfsburg.
