= Kevin Schmidt (ice hockey) =

Canadian-German ice hockey player

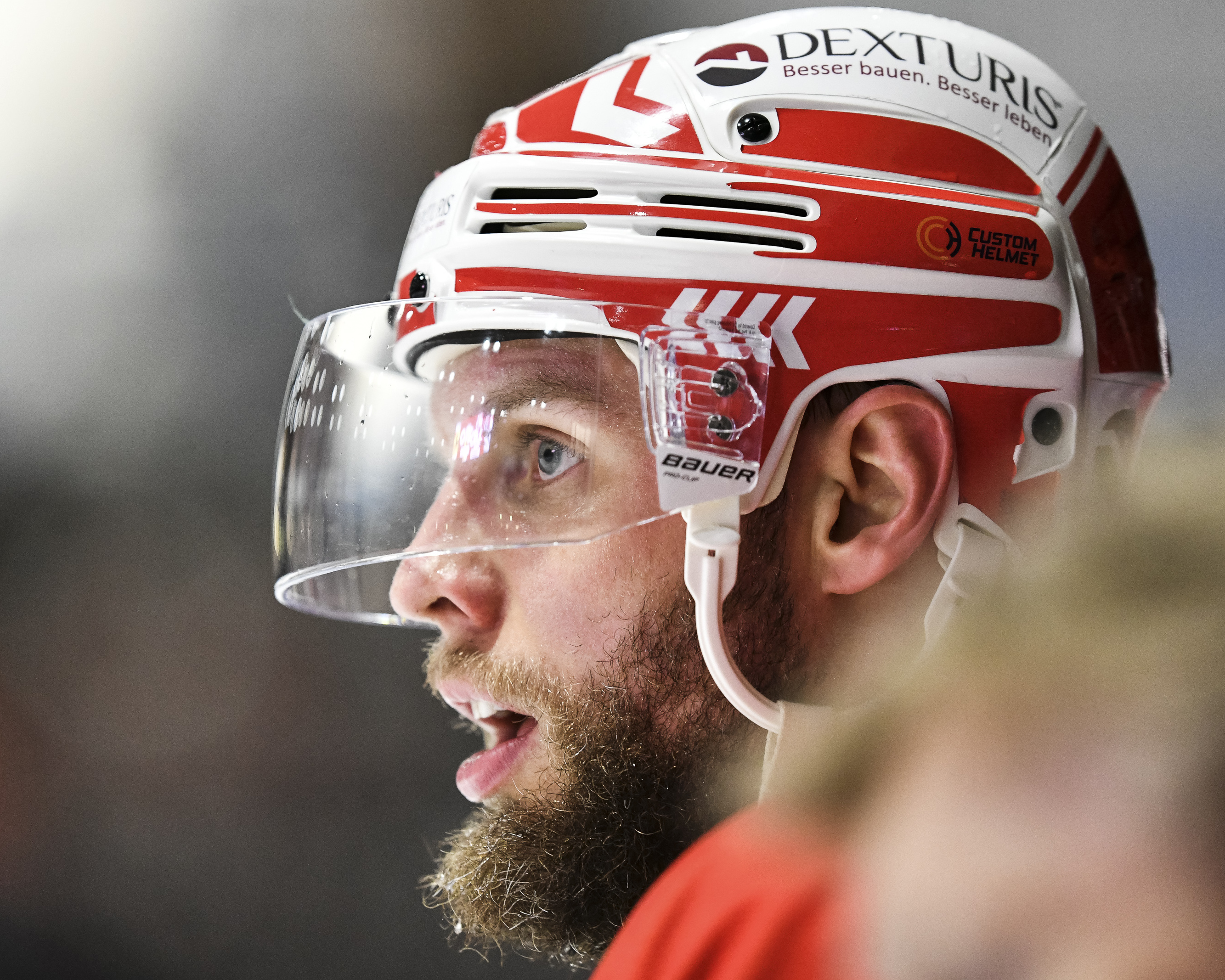
- Schmidt in 2021
- Born: February 14, 1986 (age 39) Markham, Ontario, Canada
- Height: 6 ft 1 in (185 cm)
- Weight: 176 lb (80 kg; 12 st 8 lb)
- Position: Defence
- Shot: Left
- EBEL team Former teams: EC VSV; Wheeling Nailers; Hannover Indians; Hamburg Freezers; Dornbirner EC; Iserlohn Roosters
- Current {{{league_coach}}} coach: Iowa Heartlanders
- NHL draft: Undrafted
- Playing career: 2009–2024
- Coaching career: 2024–present

Kevin Schmidt (born February 14, 1986) is a Canadian-German professional ice hockey defenceman. He is under contract with EC VSV of the Austrian Hockey League (EBEL).

== Early life ==
A native of Markham, Ontario, Schmidt graduated from St. Michael's College School in 2005. He enrolled at Bowling Green State University and played in 147 games for the Falcons during his four-year college career, serving as alternate captain his senior season.

== Career ==
Schmidt spent his first season of professional hockey in the ECHL, recording 30 points (seven goals, 23 assists) in 50 contests for the Wheeling Nailers in 2009–10.

Schmidt moved to the Hannover Indians of the second German division for the 2010–2011 season and was selected by the Hamburg Freezers, a member of Germany's topflight Deutsche Eishockey Liga (DEL), prior to the 2011–2012 campaign. In Hamburg, Schmidt evolved into a solid DEL player and was given contract extension until 2017, in December 2013. However, the Freezers folded in May 2016 and Schmidt had to look for other opportunities after five years with the team.

On June 29, 2016, he signed with Dornbirner EC of the Austrian Hockey League. He opted to return to Germany for the 2017–18 season, joining the Iserlohn Roosters.

== Personal life ==
Schmidt was granted German citizenship in August 2010. His father Horst was born in Stuttgart, Germany, and moved to Canada with his parents as a child.

== Coaching career ==
On June 18, 2024, The Iowa Heartlanders of the ECHL announced that Schmidt would take on an assistant coaching role.
