= Benedikt Schopper =

German ice hockey player

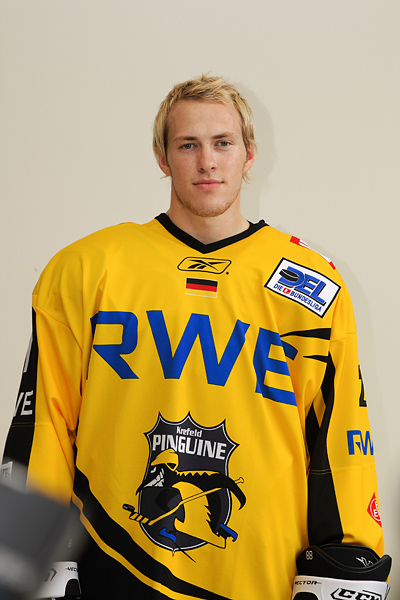
- Born: February 18, 1985 (age 40); Weiden in der Oberpfalz, West Germany
- Height: 6 ft 2 in (188 cm)
- Weight: 176 lb (80 kg; 12 st 8 lb)
- Position: Defence
- Shoots: Left
- Ger.3 team Former teams: Deggendorfer SC; Hannover Scorpions; Krefeld Pinguine; EHC Wolfsburg; ERC Ingolstadt; Straubing Tigers
- National team: Germany
- Playing career: 2004–present

Benedikt Schopper (born February 18, 1985) is a German professional ice hockey defenceman currently playing for the Deggendorfer SC in the Oberliga (Ger.3).

== Playing career ==
Schopper previously joined ERC Ingolstadt from EHC Wolfsburg on a one-year contract on April 16, 2013. After his fifth season playing with ERC Ingolstadt in 2017–18, Schopper concluded his contract and joined his fifth DEL club, agreeing to a one-year deal with the Straubing Tigers on March 28, 2018.

== Career statistics ==
=== International ===
Year	Team	Event	Result	GP	G	A	Pts	PIM
2019	Germany	WC	6th	6	0	0	0	6
Senior totals				6	0	0	0	6
