= Christoph Gawlik =

German ice hockey player

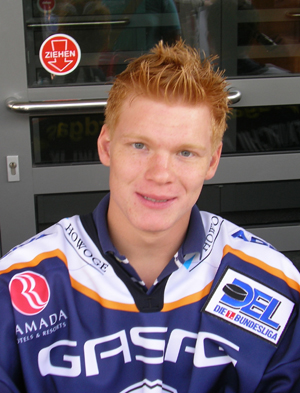
- Gawlik with Eisbären Berlin, 2007
- Born: 10 August 1987 (age 37); Deggendorf, West Germany
- Height: 1.76 m (5 ft 9 in)
- Weight: 83 kg (183 lb; 13 st 1 lb)
- Position: Left wing
- Shoots: Left
- DEL2 team Former teams: Löwen Frankfurt; Adler Mannheim; Eisbären Berlin; Frankfurt Lions; ERC Ingolstadt; Düsseldorfer EG
- National team: Germany
- Playing career: 2003–present

Christoph Gawlik (born 10 August 1987) is a German professional ice hockey player. He currently plays for Löwen Frankfurt in the DEL2. Previously he played with Adler Mannheim, Eisbären Berlin, Frankfurt Lions and ERC Ingolstadt.

Status: Retired.
