= Patrick Pohl =

German ice hockey player

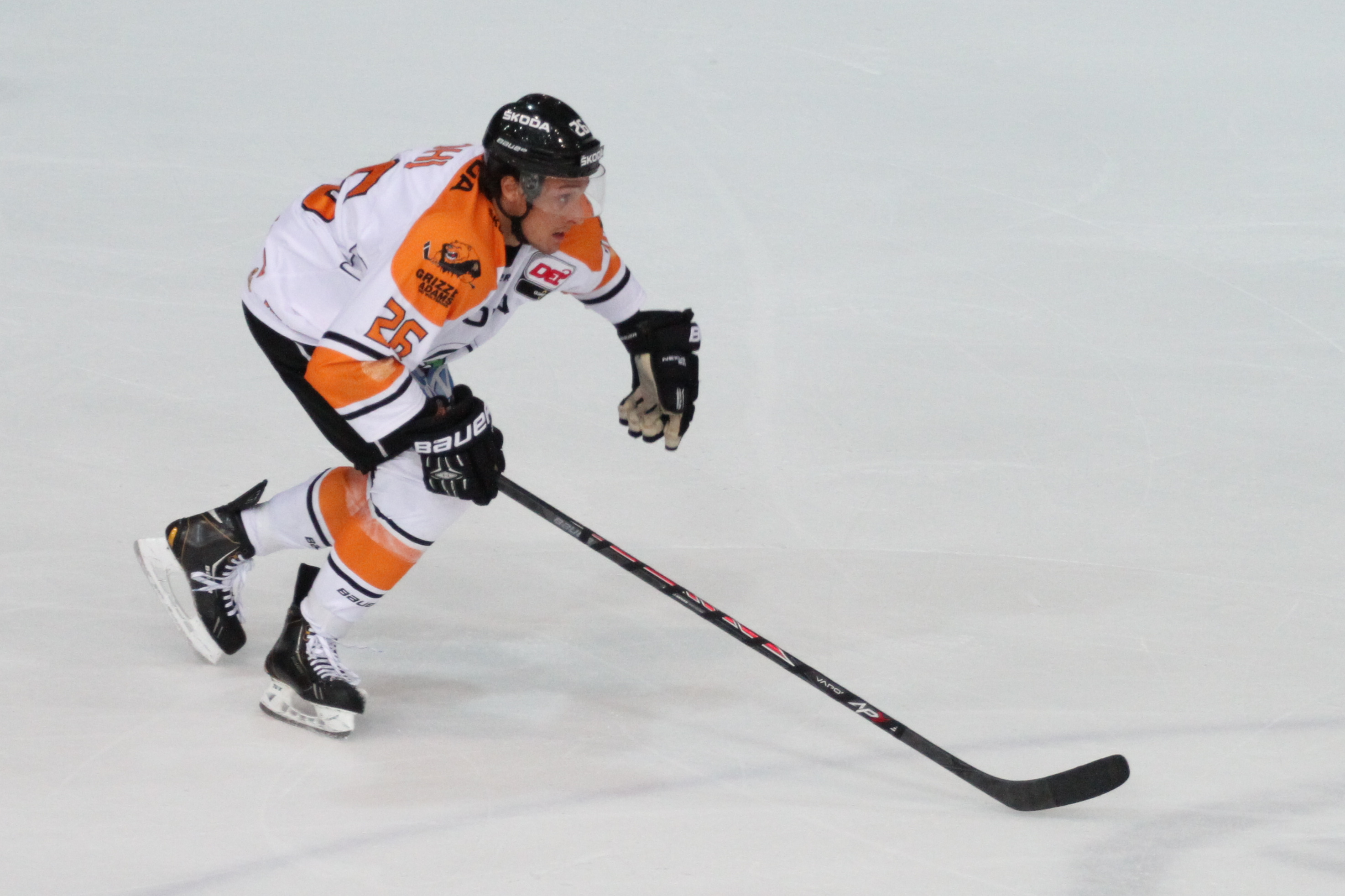
- Born: January 8, 1990 (age 35); Berlin, Germany
- Height: 5 ft 11 in (180 cm)
- Weight: 176 lb (80 kg; 12 st 8 lb)
- Position: Center
- Shoots: Left
- DEL2 team Former teams: Eispiraten Crimmitschau; Eisbären Berlin; Grizzly Adams Wolfsburg; Hamburg Freezers; Schwenninger Wild Wings
- Playing career: 2008–present

Patrick Pohl (born January 8, 1990) is a German professional ice hockey forward who currently plays for Eispiraten Crimmitschau of the DEL2. He has previously played with Eisbären Berlin, Grizzly Adams Wolfsburg and Hamburg Freezers. On June 2, 2015, Pohl left the Freezers and signed a one-year contract with Schwenninger Wild Wings.
