= Armin Wurm =

German ice hockey player

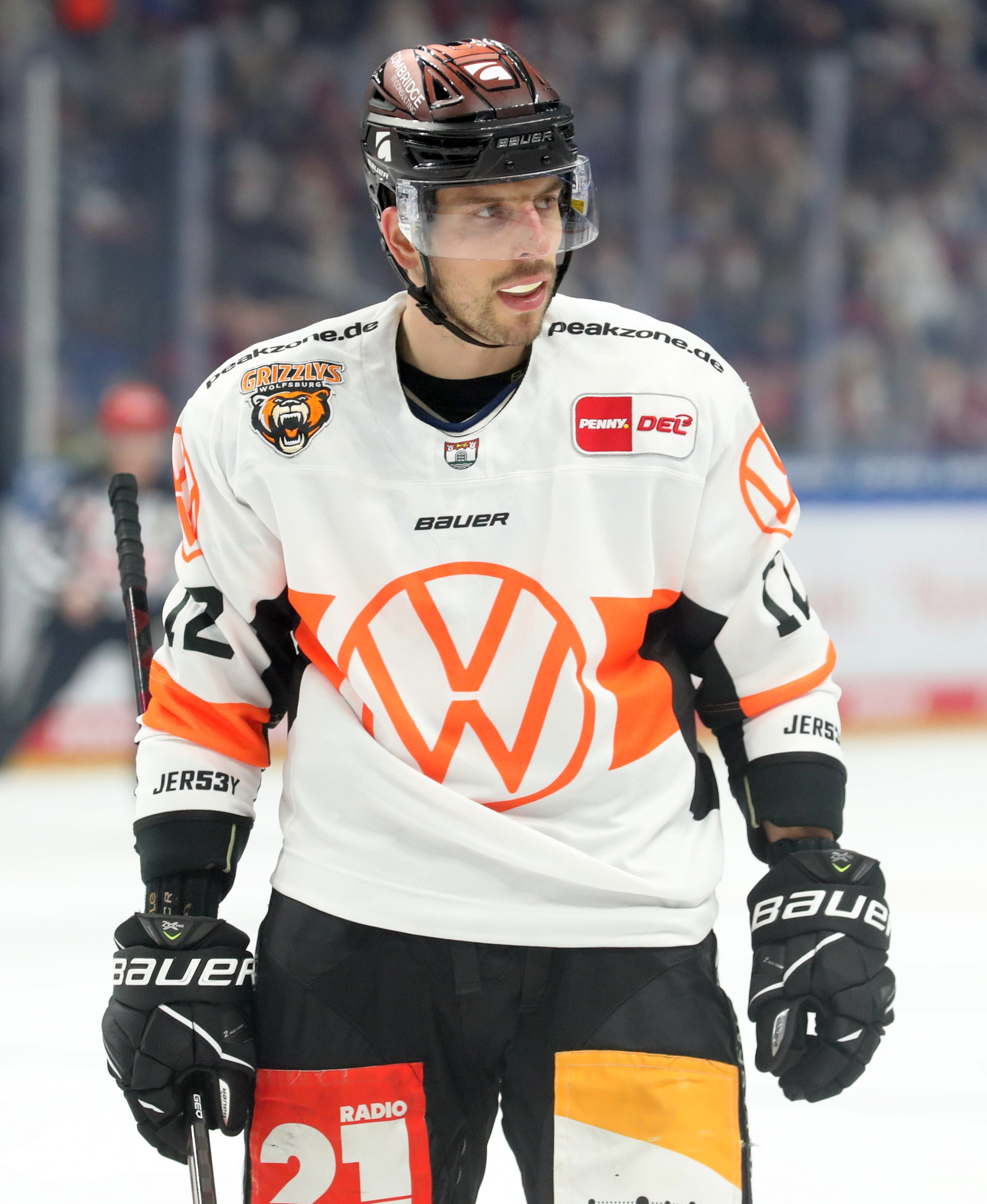
- Born: June 11, 1989 (age 35); Füssen, West Germany
- Height: 6 ft 1 in (185 cm)
- Weight: 187 lb (85 kg; 13 st 5 lb)
- Position: Defence
- Shot: Left
- Played for: Grizzlys Wolfsburg
- Playing career: 2009–2024

Armin Wurm (born June 11, 1989) is a German former professional ice hockey defenceman. He played the entirety of his professional career with Grizzlys Wolfsburg in the Deutsche Eishockey Liga (DEL).
