= 2012–13 DEL season =

- League: Deutsche Eishockey Liga
- Sport: Ice Hockey
- Duration: 14 September 2012–21 April 2013
- Games: 402
- Teams: 14
- Total attendance: 2,595,158 (6,456 per game)
- TV partner(s): Laola1; Servus TV

Regular season
- Season champions: Adler Mannheim
- Top scorer: (Sweden) Carl Ridderwall (Düsseldorfer EG)

Finals
- Champions: Eisbären Berlin

DEL seasons
- ← 2011–12 2013–14 →

The 2012–13 Deutsche Eishockey Liga season was the 19th season since the founding of the Deutsche Eishockey Liga.

== Teams ==
Teams of the 2012–13 DEL season

Team	City	Arena
Augsburger Panther	Augsburg	Curt Frenzel Stadium
Eisbären Berlin	Berlin	O2 World
Düsseldorfer EG	Düsseldorf	ISS Dome
Hamburg Freezers	Hamburg	Color Line Arena
Hannover Scorpions	Hanover	TUI Arena
ERC Ingolstadt	Ingolstadt	Saturn Arena
Iserlohn Roosters	Iserlohn	Eissporthalle Iserlohn
Kölner Haie	Cologne	Lanxess Arena
Krefeld Pinguine	Krefeld	König Palast
Adler Mannheim	Mannheim	SAP Arena
Red Bull München	Munich	Olympia Eishalle
Thomas Sabo Ice Tigers	Nuremberg	Nuremberg Arena
Straubing Tigers	Straubing	Eisstadion am Pulverturm
Grizzly Adams Wolfsburg	Wolfsburg	Eisarena Wolfsburg

== Regular season ==
	Team	GP	W	OTW	SOW	OTL	SOL	L	Goals	Points
1	Adler Mannheim	52	30	1	2	2	1	16	164:125	99
2	Kölner Haie	52	29	3	2	1	1	16	165:137	99
3	Krefeld Pinguine	52	20	6	5	1	5	15	166:145	88
4	Eisbären Berlin	52	23	2	3	3	3	18	180:152	85
5	Hamburg Freezers	52	24	1	2	3	4	18	158:130	85
6	ERC Ingolstadt	52	21	6	2	3	2	18	161:149	84
7	Thomas Sabo Ice Tigers	52	21	1	2	4	4	20	161:159	77
8	Augsburger Panther	52	22	1	3	1	2	23	137:155	77
9	Straubing Tigers	52	21	2	2	1	2	24	133:145	74
10	EHC Wolfsburg	52	19	4	2	2	2	23	142:150	73
11	Hannover Scorpions	52	21	2	1	2	1	25	124:148	72
12	EHC München	52	19	0	3	3	5	22	125:137	71
13	Iserlohn Roosters	52	16	2	2	2	1	29	130:167	59
14	Düsseldorfer EG	52	11	1	4	4	2	30	131:178	49

GP = Games Played, W = Wins, OTW = Overtime win, SOW = Shootout win, OTL = Overtime loss, SOL = Shootout loss, L = Loss
Color code: = Direct Playoff qualification, = Playoff qualification round, = No playoff

== Playoffs ==
=== Playoff qualification ===
The playoff qualification was played between March 13 and 17, 2013 in a Best-of-three mode.

			1	2	3
Thomas Sabo Ice Tigers	1–2	EHC Wolfsburg	3–2	3–4	3–5
Augsburger Panther	0–2	Straubing Tigers	2–3 (OT)	1–4	–

==== Thomas Sabo Ice Tigers vs. EHC Wolfsburg ====
13 March 2013; 19:30	Thomas Sabo Ice Tigers	3–2 (1–0, 0–1, 2–1)	EHC Wolfsburg	Nuremberg Arena; Attendance: 4,078

Game reference

Andreas Jenike
Goalies
Daniar Dshunussow
Referees:
Marcus Brill
Georg Jablukov
Linesmen:
Markku Büse
Stefan Velkoski

S. Rupprich (D. Weiss, P. Buzas) – 05:17	1–0
	1–1	25:43 – G. Moore (J. Mercier, L. Nelson)
E. Kaufmann (Y. Ehliz, E. Chouinard) – 41:56	2–1
	2–2	51:32 – B. Kohl (P. Kohl)
R. Leask (C. James, Y. Stastny) – 54:22	3–2

6 min
Penalties
10 min
28
Shots
31

15 March 2013; 19:30	EHC Wolfsburg	4–3 (3–1, 1–2, 0–0)	Thomas Sabo Ice Tigers	Eisarena Wolfsburg; Attendance: 2,215

Game reference

Daniar Dshunussow
Goalies
Andreas Jenike
Referees:
Marcus Brill
Georg Jablukov
Linesmen:
Thomas Gemeinhardt
Andre Schrader

K. Hospelt (A. Polaczek, B. Kohl) – 06:27	1–0
S. Furchner (A. Polaczek, A. Wurm) – 08:23	2–0
	2–1	08:42 – C. James (Y. Stastny, S. Reinprecht)
A. Brocklehurst (N. Milley, M. Dzieduszycki) (PP) – 11:15	3–1
N. Milley (T. Haskins, M. Dzieduszycki) – 24:12	4–1
	4–2	27:48 – S. Butenschön (E. Kaufmann, E. Chouinard)
	4–3	39:02 – S. Reinprecht (Y. Stastny, J. Pollock)

8 min
Penalties
18 min
30
Shots
35

17 March 2013; 14:30	Thomas Sabo Ice Tigers	3–5 (1–0, 0–3, 2–2)	EHC Wolfsburg	Nuremberg Arena; Attendance: 4,412

Game reference

Andreas Jenike
Goalies
Daniar Dshunussow
Referees:
Lars Brüggemann
Daniel Piechaczek
Linesmen:
Benjamin Hoppe
Christoffer Hurtik

S. Reinprecht (P. Lindlbauer, Y. Stastny) – 06:06	1–0
	1–1	23:44 – N. Milley (T. Haskins)
	1–2	29:15 – N. Milley (M. Dzieduszycki)
	1–3	37:09 – M. Dzieduszycki (N. Milley, S. Furchner) (PP)
	1–4	49:11 – T. Haskins (N. Milley, M. Dzieduszycki)
Y. Stastny (C. Borer, J. Pollock) – 52:55	2–4
	2–5	57:36 – J. Mercier (S. Furchner) (ENG)
J. Pollock (C. Borer) – 58:31	3–5

8 min
Penalties
10 min
27
Shots
20

==== Augsburger Panther vs. Straubing Tigers ====
13 March 2013; 19:30	Augsburger Panther	2–3 OT (0–1, 2–0, 0–1) (OT 0–1)	Straubing Tigers	Curt Frenzel Stadion; Attendance: 5,233

Game reference

Patrick Ehelechner
Goalies
Jason Bacashihua
Referees:
Lars Brüggemann
Daniel Piechaczek
Linesmen:
Robert Hauber
Martin Holzer

	0–1	05:35 – R. Kramer (T. Beechey, B. Down) (PP)
D. Whitmore (S. Tölzer, B. Roloff) – 20:27	1–1
S. Tölzer (C. Bassen, J. Zeiler) – 23:22	2–1
	2–2	46:26 – K. Stewart (B. Down, A. Canzanello)
	2–3	79:29 – M. Endrass (B. Down, T. Beechey)

37 min
Penalties
24 min
28
Shots
35

15 March 2013; 19:30	Straubing Tigers	4–1 (1–0, 2–0, 1–1)	Augsburger Panther	Eisstadion am Pulverturm; Attendance: 5,819

Game reference

Jason Bacashihua
Goalies
Patrick Ehelechner
Leonardo Conti
Referees:
Lars Brüggemann
Daniel Piechaczek
Linesmen:
Christian Höck
Pascal Kretschmer

B. Keil (B. Down, T. Beechey) – 01:27	1–0
T. Beechey (S. Ortolf, B. Down) – 21:46	2–0
T. Beechey (B. Down, B. Keil) – 39:47	3–0
A. Dotzler (R. Röthke, K. Stewart) – 49:32	4–0
	4–1	56:17 – S. Somma (B. Roloff, P. Seifert)

22 min
Penalties
28 min
25
Shots
29

=== Bracket ===
There was a reseeding after the first round.

Quarterfinals
1	Adler Mannheim	2
10	EHC Wolfsburg	4
2	Kölner Haie	4
9	Straubing Tigers	1
(Pairings are reseeded after the first round)
3	Krefeld Pinguine	4
6	ERC Ingolstadt	2
4	Eisbären Berlin	4
5	Hamburg Freezers	2

Semifinals
2	Kölner Haie	3
10	EHC Wolfsburg	0
3	Krefeld Pinguine	0
4	Eisbären Berlin	3

Final
2	Kölner Haie	1
4	Eisbären Berlin	3

=== Quarterfinals ===
The quarterfinals were played between 20 March and 1 April 2013 in a Best-of-seven mode.

==== Adler Mannheim vs. EHC Wolfsburg ====
20 March 2013; 19:30	Adler Mannheim	2–3 OT (1–0, 1–0, 0–2) (OT 0–1)	EHC Wolfsburg	SAP Arena; Attendance: 11,033

Game reference

Dennis Endras
Goalies
Daniar Dshunussow
Sebastian Vogl
Referees:
Lars Brüggemann
Gordon Schukies
Linesmen:
Benjamin Hoppe
Christoffer Hurtik

F. Mauer (J. Sifers, M. Plachta) (PP) – 18:54	1–0
F. Mauer (Y. Lehoux, D. Reul) – 23:32	2–0
	2–1	55:14 – N. Milley (M. Dzieduszycki, A. Brocklehurst) (PP)
	2–2	57:46 – R. Bina (S. Furchner)
	2–3	70:55 – G. Moore (S. Furchner)

18 min
Penalties
28 min
43
Shots
33

22 March 2013; 19:30	EHC Wolfsburg	2–3 OT3 (0–1, 2–1, 0–0) (OT 0–0, 0–0, 0–1)	Adler Mannheim	Eisarena Wolfsburg; Attendance: 3,471

Game reference

Daniar Dshunussow
Goalies
Dennis Endras
Referees:
Georg Jablukov
Markus Schütz
Linesmen:
Sirko Hunnius
Nikolaj Ponomarjow

	0–1	00:07 – Y. Seidenberg (S. Belle)
S. Furchner (K. Hospelt, B. Kohl) (SH) – 29:44	1–1
	1–2	31:36 – D. Janik (C. Ullmann)
K. Hospelt (N. Milley, B. Kohl) – 39:33	2–2
	2–3	105:54 – M. Plachta (D. Janik)

20 min
Penalties
12 min
47
Shots
44

24 March 2013; 14:30	Adler Mannheim	0–1 (0–0, 0–0, 0–1)	EHC Wolfsburg	SAP Arena; Attendance: 13,600

Game reference
Dennis Endras	Goalies	Daniar Dshunussow	Referees: Georg Jablukov; Florian Zehetleitner; Linesmen: Markus Mosler; Matthias Starke
0–1 / 50:32 – B. Schopper			Referees: Georg Jablukov; Florian Zehetleitner; Linesmen: Markus Mosler; Matthias Starke
6 min	Penalties	14 min	Referees: Georg Jablukov; Florian Zehetleitner; Linesmen: Markus Mosler; Matthias Starke
36	Shots	28	Referees: Georg Jablukov; Florian Zehetleitner; Linesmen: Markus Mosler; Matthias Starke

26 March 2013; 19:30	EHC Wolfsburg	3–0 (1–0, 0–0, 2–0)	Adler Mannheim	Eisarena Wolfsburg; Attendance: 3,587

Game reference

Daniar Dshunussow
Goalies
Dennis Endras
Referees:
Lars Brüggemann
Gordon Schukies
Linesmen:
Sirko Hunnius
Nikolaj Ponomarjow

A. Polaczek (K. Hospelt, B. Kohl) (PP) – 18:46	1–0
T. Haskins (M. Dzieduszycki, N. Milley) – 48:59	2–0
G. Moore (ENG) – 58:15	3–0

10 min
Penalties
8 min
25
Shots
27

28 March 2013; 19:30	Adler Mannheim	3–2 OT (0–2, 0–0, 2–0) (OT 1–0)	EHC Wolfsburg	SAP Arena; Attendance: 12,159

Game reference

Dennis Endras
Goalies
Daniar Dshunussow
Referees:
Georg Jablukov
Markus Schütz
Linesmen:
Benjamin Hoppe
Christoffer Hurtik

	0–1	05:48 – T. Haskins (M. Walter, M. Dzieduszycki)
	0–2	15:40 – A. Brocklehurst (M. Dzieduszycki, T. Haskins)
K. Magowan (A. Mitchell, F. Kettemer) – 43:07	1–2
F. Mauer (Y. Lehoux) – 55:05	2–2
F. Kettemer – 62:42	3–2

2 min
Penalties
8 min
40
Shots
34

30 March 2013; 17:30	EHC Wolfsburg	4–3 (1–2, 2–0, 1–1)	Adler Mannheim	Eisarena Wolfsburg; Attendance: 4,119

Game reference

Daniar Dshunussow
Goalies
Dennis Endras
Referees:
Georg Jablukov
Florian Zehetleitner
Linesmen:
Sirko Hunnius
Nikolaj Ponomarjow

G. Moore (M. Dzieduszycki, S. Furchner) (PP) – 09:22	1–0
	1–1	15:08 – C. Ullmann (A. Mitchell)
	1–2	19:59 – Y. Lehoux (A. Mitchell) (PP)
A. Polaczek (T. Haskins, R. Bina) (PP) – 31:28	2–2
V. Mayer (P. Pohl, A. Grygiel) – 35:50	3–2
	3–3	45:15 – F. Mauer
A. Brocklehurst (N. Milley, G. Moore) – 48:37	4–3

12 min
Penalties
12 min
30
Shots
39

==== Kölner Haie vs. Straubing Tigers ====
20 March 2013; 19:30	Kölner Haie	6–1 (2–1, 1–0, 3–0)	Straubing Tigers	Lanxess Arena; Attendance: 9,066

Game reference

Danny aus den Birken
Goalies
Jason Bacashihua
Jan Guryca
Referees:
Marcus Brill
Georg Jablukov
Linesmen:
Andreas Kowert
Alexander Schelewski

	0–1	05:36 – M. Hussey (A. Canzanello, M. Endrass) (PP)
J. Tripp (N. Robinson, C. Stephens) – 06:48	1–1
M. Ohmann (R. Tičar, A. Kranjc) – 07:22	2–1
J. Tripp (A. Holmqvist C. Stephens) – 26:40	3–1
M. Sturm (F. Schütz, M. Lüdemann) – 44:48	4–1
C. Minard (P. Gogulla) – 46:13	5–1
P. Gogulla (A. Weiss, F. Schütz) – 57:35	6–1

18 min
Penalties
18 min
56
Shots
37

22 March 2013; 19:30	Straubing Tigers	5–2 (1–1, 0–0, 4–1)	Kölner Haie	Eisstadion am Pulverturm; Attendance: 5,817

Game reference

Jason Bacashihua
Goalies
Danny aus den Birken
Referees:
Stephan Bauer
Willi Schimm
Linesmen:
Christian Höck
Pascal Kretschmer

B. Down (R. Kramer, T. Beechey) (PP2) – 01:37	1–0
	1–1	13:30 – J. Tripp (C. Stephens)
R. Röthke (B. Down) – 43:12	2–1
A. Dotzler (S. Osterloh) – 50:23	3–1
B. Down (B. Brückner, B. Keil) – 50:59	4–1
	4–2	57:07 – A. Kranjc (C. Minard, A. Falk)
R. Röthke (L. Meunier) (ENG) – 58:39	5–2

24 min
Penalties
12 min
37
Shots
35

24 March 2013; 14:30	Kölner Haie	5–0 (3–0, 0–0, 2–0)	Straubing Tigers	Lanxess Arena; Attendance: 13,431

Game reference

Danny aus den Birken
Goalies
Jason Bacashihua
Referees:
Daniel Piechaczek
Gordon Schukies
Linesmen:
Thomas Gemeinhardt
Andre Schrader

N. Robinson (C. Stephens, J. Tripp) – 11:24	1–0
N. Robinson (A. Kranjc, C. Stephens) – 11:46	2–0
F. Schütz (R. Tičar, M. Sturm) – 12:21	3–0
F. Schütz (M. Sturm, R. Tičar) – 52:20	4–0
G. Claaßen (M. Mueller, P. Riefers) – 59:12	5–0

16 min
Penalties
14 min
46
Shots
32

26 March 2013; 19:30	Straubing Tigers	3–6 (1–0, 0–4, 2–2)	Kölner Haie	Eisstadion am Pulverturm; Attendance: 5,817

Game reference

Jason Bacashihua
Jan Guryca
Goalies
Danny aus den Birken
Referees:
Marcus Brill
Georg Jablukov
Linesmen:
Robert Hauber
Martin Holzer

S. Osterloh (S. Schönberger, D. Whitecotton) – 06:00	1–0
	1–1	23:32 – N. Robinson (M. Mueller, C. Stephens)
	1–2	25:27 – C. Minard (D. Tjernqvist, A. Falk) (PP)
	1–3	27:04 – M. Ohmann (F. Schütz, A. Kranjc) (SH)
	1–4	35:02 – N. Robinson (D. Tjernqvist, A. Holmqvist) (PP)
	1–5	49:27 – F. Schütz (M. Sturm, A. Weiss)
D. Whitecotton (S. Osterloh, M. Hussey) – 51:24	2–5
F. Ondruschka (L. Meunier, R. Röthke) (PP) – 58:25	3–5
	3–6	59:53 – A. Weiss (T. Ankert, M. Lüdemann) (SH, ENG)

8 min
Penalties
10 min
31
Shots
35

28 March 2013; 19:30	Kölner Haie	2–1 OT (0–0, 1–0, 0–1) (OT 1–0)	Straubing Tigers	Lanxess Arena; Attendance: 11,843

Game reference

Danny aus den Birken
Goalies
Jason Bacashihua
Referees:
Stephan Bauer
Willi Schimm
Linesmen:
Andreas Kowert
Alexander Schelewski

M. Sturm (F. Schütz) (PP) – 24:20	1–0
	1–1	51:01 – M. Hussey (D. Whitecotton, M. Endrass)
P. Gogulla – 66:41	2–1

10 min
Penalties
12 min
32
Shots
34

==== Krefeld Pinguine vs. ERC Ingolstadt ====
20 March 2013; 19:30	Krefeld Pinguine	3–1 (2–1, 0–0, 1–0)	ERC Ingolstadt	König Palast; Attendance: 6,528

Game reference

Scott Langkow
Goalies
Ian Gordon
Referees:
Stephan Bauer
Willi Schimm
Linesmen:
Thomas Gemeinhardt
Andre Schrader

	0–1	03:59 – M. Périard (J. Motzko, P. Hager)
H. Vasiļjevs (B. Blank, T. Kůrka) (PP) – 07:27	1–1
J. Meyers (PP) – 09:58	2–1
H. Vasiļjevs (A. Driendl, B. Blank) – 47:33	3–1

49 min
Penalties
51 min
22
Shots
26

22 March 2013; 19:30	ERC Ingolstadt	4–1 (1–1, 2–0, 1–0)	Krefeld Pinguine	Saturn Arena; Attendance: 4,381

Game reference

Ian Gordon
Goalies
Scott Langkow
Tomáš Duba
Christian Wendler
Referees:
Alfred Hascher
Daniel Piechaczek
Linesmen:
Markku Büse
Stefan Velkoski

J. Motzko (D. Hahn, J. Laliberte) (PP) – 11:04	1–0
	1–1	13:05 – M. Voakes (F. Méthot, K. Sonnenburg)
M. Périard (T. Greilinger, D. Hahn) (PP2) – 24:03	2–1
J-F. Boucher (C. Weller, M. Périard) – 30:50	3–1
J. Motzko (M. Périard) – 55:49	4–1

12 min
Penalties
26 min
28
Shots
12

24 March 2013; 14:30	Krefeld Pinguine	4–1 (1–1, 1–0, 2–0)	ERC Ingolstadt	König Palast; Attendance: 7,908

Game reference

Tomáš Duba
Goalies
Ian Gordon
Referees:
Marcus Brill
Lars Brüggemann
Linesmen:
Andreas Kowert
Alexander Schelewski

F. Méthot (D. Pietta, M. Robar) (PP) – 01:44	1–0
	1–1	08:52 – T. Hambly (J. Motzko, D. Hahn) (PP)
H. Vasiļjevs (A. Driendl, B. Blank) – 33:19	2–1
B. Blank (A. Driendl, T. Duba) – 55:46	3–1
B. Blank (D. Pietta, S. Akdag) (ENG) – 59:49	4–1

32 min
Penalties
22 min
20
Shots
26

26 March 2013; 19:30	ERC Ingolstadt	2–5 (1–1, 1–2, 0–2)	Krefeld Pinguine	Saturn Arena; Attendance: 4,635

Game reference

Ian Gordon
Goalies
Tomáš Duba
Referees:
Stephan Bauer
Willi Schimm
Linesmen:
Christian Höck
Pascal Kretschmer

	0–1	12:10 – A. Driendl (H. Vasiļjevs, T. Kůrka) (PP)
P. Hager (B. Barta, J. Motzko) – 17:04	1–1
	1–2	20:44 – H. Vasiļjevs (M. Schymainski, D. Pietta)
T. Greilinger (M. Périard, J. Likens) – 22:14	2–2
	2–3	38:34 – H. Vasiļjevs (B. Blank, K. Sonnenburg)
	2–4	46:50 – B. Blank (M. Robar, A. Driendl)
	2–5	59:14 – M. Schymainski (R. Verwey, D. Pietta) (ENG)

39 min
Penalties
12 min
20
Shots
30

28 March 2013; 19:30	Krefeld Pinguine	1–2 (0–2, 0–0, 1–0)	ERC Ingolstadt	König Palast; Attendance: 7,829

Game reference

Tomáš Duba
Goalies
Markus Janka
Referees:
Alfred Hascher
Daniel Piechaczek
Linesmen:
Thomas Gemeinhardt
Andre Schrader

	0–1	05:10 – T. Greilinger (M. Périard, D. Hahn)
	0–2	17:39 – S. O`Connor (M. Périard, J-F. Boucher)
K. Clark (F. Méthot, D. Pietta) – 50:50	1–2

20 min
Penalties
16 min
25
Shots
31

30 March 2013; 17:30	ERC Ingolstadt	2–7 (1–1, 1–5, 0–1)	Krefeld Pinguine	Saturn Arena; Attendance: 4,351

Game reference

Markus Janka
Ian Gordon
Goalies
Tomáš Duba
Referees:
Marcus Brill
Lars Brüggemann
Linesmen:
Benjamin Hoppe
Christoffer Hurtik

	0–1	05:47 – K. Clark (F. Méthot, M. Robar)
T. Greilinger (D. Hahn) – 15:25	1–1
D. Hahn (J. Ross, J. Laliberte) (PP) – 23:31	2–1
	2–2	31:26 – D. Pietta (PS)
	2–3	32:15 – F. Méthot (K. Clark, T. Kůrka)
	2–4	32:38 – B. Blank (A. Driendl, E. Ostwald)
	2–5	34:02 – T. Kůrka (K. Clark, F. Méthot)
	2–6	36:25 – K. Clark (F. Méthot, T. Kůrka)
	2–7	54:56 – D. Pietta (R. Verwey, M. Schymainski)

30 min
Penalties
34 min
22
Shots
29

==== Eisbären Berlin vs. Hamburg Freezers ====
20 March 2013; 19:30	Eisbären Berlin	6–5 OT (0–4, 2–0, 3–1) (OT 1–0)	Hamburg Freezers	O_{2} World; Attendance: 13,600

Game reference

Rob Zepp
Goalies
Niklas Treutle
Referees:
Andreas Aumüller
Daniel Piechaczek
Linesmen:
Sirko Hunnius
Nikolaj Ponomarjow

	0–1	02:46 – G. Festerling (D. Westcott, J. Flaake)
	0–2	03:38 – E. Schneider (M. Pettinger)
	0–3	12:14 – J. Jakobsen (T. Dolak, C. Schubert)
	0–4	14:16 – T. Dolak (R. Collins, T. Oppenheimer) (PP)
J. Talbot (D. Olver) (PP) – 20:45	1–4
D. Olver (F. Busch, T. Mulock) (PP2) – 39:03	2–4
T. J. Mulock (A. Rankel) – 44:11	3–4
M. Christensen (T. Mulock) – 46:23	4–4
J. Baxmann (D. Olver) – 47:05	5–4
	5–5	56:57 – E. Schneider (R. Collins) (PP2)
T. J. Mulock (PP) – 70:01	6–5

6 min
Penalties
20 min
49
Shots
34

22 March 2013; 19:30	Hamburg Freezers	5–3 (0–1, 1–1, 4–1)	Eisbären Berlin	O_{2} World; Attendance: 9,180

Game reference

Niklas Treutle
Goalies
Rob Zepp
Referees:
Lars Brüggemann
Florian Zehetleitner
Linesmen:
Gregor Brodnicki
Marc Iwert

	0–1	15:00 – A. Rankel (F. Hördler) (PP)
J. Flaake (G. Festerling, D. Wolf) – 24:31	1–1
	1–2	35:54 – B. Tallackson (D. Olver, F. Busch) (PP)
	1–3	45:05 – D. Olver (F. Hördler) (PP)
C. Murphy (T. Dolak, M. Roy) – 56:00	2–3
E. Schneider (T. Oppenheimer, D. Nielsen) – 56:54	3–3
T. Dolak – 58:00	4–3
J. Flaake (M. Pettinger) (ENG) – 59:35	5–3

77 min
Penalties
56 min
36
Shots
27

25 March 2013; 19:30	Eisbären Berlin	4–8 (0–3, 3–4, 1–1)	Hamburg Freezers	O_{2} World; Attendance: 13,800

Game reference

Rob Zepp
Sebastian Elwing
Goalies
Niklas Treutle
Referees:
Stephan Bauer
Willi Schimm
Linesmen:
Sirko Hunnius
Nikolaj Ponomarjow

	0–1	11:26 – B. Reid (M. Pettinger, C. Murphy)
	0–2	16:53 – T. Dolak (M. Roy, K. Schmidt)
	0–3	19:41 – E. Schneider (T. Oppenheimer, M. Roy)
T. Mulock (C. Locke, C. Braun) – 21:57	1–3
	1–4	23:02 – P. Köppchen (T. Oppenheimer)
	1–5	25:29 – T. Dolak (J. Jakobsen, M. Roy)
	1–6	26:05 – R. Collins (PS)
	1–7	35:17 – R. Collins (B. Reid, C. Schubert)
M. Christensen (C. Braun, A. Rankel) (PP) – 39:31	2–7
D. Olver (T. J. Mulock, C. Braun) (PP) – 39:51	3–7
C. Braun (T. J. Mulock, J. Arniel) (PP) – 44:22	4–7
	4–8	53:53 – D. Nielsen (J. Bettauer, R. Collins) (PP)

39 min
Penalties
39 min
30
Shots
29

26 March 2013; 19:30	Hamburg Freezers	2–3 OT (2–2, 0–0, 0–0) (OT 0–1)	Eisbären Berlin	O_{2} World; Attendance: 9,425

Game reference

Niklas Treutle
Goalies
Rob Zepp
Referees:
Andreas Aumüller
Daniel Piechaczek
Linesmen:
Thomas Gemeinhardt
Andre Schrader

B. Reid (C. Murphy, P. Köppchen) – 11:55	1–0
	1–1	14:14 – T. J. Mulock (J. Talbot, C. Locke) (PP2)
D. Wolf (G. Festerling, M. Roy) – 17:22	2–1
	2–2	19:42 – J. Talbot (R. Caldwell, T. J. Mulock)
	2–3	65:21 – J. Talbot (D. Olver, F. Hördler) (PP)

32 min
Penalties
28 min
39
Shots
36

28 March 2013; 19:30	Eisbären Berlin	3–2 (1–0, 1–0, 1–2)	Hamburg Freezers	O_{2} World; Attendance: 13,700

Game reference

Rob Zepp
Goalies
Niklas Treutle
Referees:
Lars Brüggemann
Florian Zehetleitner
Linesmen:
Sirko Hunnius
Nikolaj Ponomarjow

V. Schlenker (C. Locke, A. Rankel) – 03:00	1–0
T. J. Mulock (A. Rankel) – 38:10	2–0
	2–1	45:02 – M. Pettinger (C. Murphy)
	2–2	55:02 – D. Nielsen (R. Collins)
J. Baxmann – 59:59	3–2

8 min
Penalties
10 min
33
Shots
35

30 March 2013; 17:30	Hamburg Freezers	2–3 (0–0, 0–3, 2–0)	Eisbären Berlin	O_{2} World; Attendance: 8,580

Game reference

Niklas Treutle
Goalies
Rob Zepp
Referees:
Stephan Bauer
Willi Schimm
Linesmen:
Thomas Gemeinhardt
Andre Schrader

	0–1	22:00 – B. Tallackson (D. Olver, J. Talbot) (PP)
	0–2	23:33 – J. Baxmann (D. Olver, A. Rankel)
	0–3	39:01 – T. Mulock (T. J. Mulock, J. Sharrow)
T. Dolak (D. Wolf, E. Schneider) – 42:00	1–3
B. Reid (M. Roy, K. Schmidt) – 55:35	2–3

4 min
Penalties
10 min
34
Shots
26

=== Semifinals ===
The semifinals were played between 3 and 12 April 2013 in a Best-of-five mode.

==== Kölner Haie vs. EHC Wolfsburg ====
3 April 2013; 19:30	Kölner Haie	7–2 (3–0, 2–1, 2–1)	EHC Wolfsburg	Lanxess Arena; Attendance: 10,362

Game reference

Danny aus den Birken
Goalies
Daniar Dshunussow
Sebastian Vogl
Referees:
Lars Brüggemann
Andreas Aumüller
Linesmen:
Andreas Kowert
Alexander Schelewski

P. Gogulla (T. Ankert, A. Falk) – 08:06	1–0
M. Sturm (F. Schütz, A. Holmqvist) – 14:16	2–0
A. Weiss (M. Lüdemann, T. Ankert) – 16:17	3–0
M. Ohmann (R. Tičar, G. Claaßen) – 21:45	4–0
M. Sturm (F. Schütz, A. Kranjc) – 23:53	5–0
	5–1	24:06 – L. Nelson (J. Mercier, G. Moore)
C. Stephens (D. Tjernqvist, F. Schütz) (PP) – 48:32	6–1
M. Ohmann (A. Weiss, B. Krupp) – 51:31	7–1
	7–2	56:32 – J. Mercier (G. Moore, L. Nelson)

8 min
Penalties
10 min
39
Shots
27

5 April 2013; 19:30	EHC Wolfsburg	0–1 (0–1, 0–0, 0–0)	Kölner Haie	Eisarena Wolfsburg; Attendance: 4,503

Game reference
Daniar Dshunussow	Goalies	Danny aus den Birken	Referees: Daniel Piechaczek; Gordon Schukies; Linesmen: Sirko Hunnius; Nikolaj Ponomarjow
0–1 / 07:17 – C. Minard (P. Gogulla, A. Falk)			Referees: Daniel Piechaczek; Gordon Schukies; Linesmen: Sirko Hunnius; Nikolaj Ponomarjow
14 min	Penalties	12 min	Referees: Daniel Piechaczek; Gordon Schukies; Linesmen: Sirko Hunnius; Nikolaj Ponomarjow
32	Shots	23	Referees: Daniel Piechaczek; Gordon Schukies; Linesmen: Sirko Hunnius; Nikolaj Ponomarjow

7 April 2013; 14:30	Kölner Haie	4–2 (1–0, 3–1, 0–1)	EHC Wolfsburg	Lanxess Arena; Attendance: 18,287

Game reference

Danny aus den Birken
Goalies
Daniar Dshunussow
Referees:
Georg Jablukov
Marcus Brill
Linesmen:
Thomas Gemeinhardt
Andre Schrader

D. Tjernqvist (A. Holmqvist, P. Gogulla) (PP) – 05:34	1–0
P. Gogulla (D. Tjernqvist, A. Holmqvist) (PP) – 20:35	2–0
N. Robinson (B. Krupp, D. Tjernqvist) – 31:53	3–0
C. Stephens (N. Robinson, A. Holmqvist) – 35:24	4–0
	4–1	37:15 – A. Grygiel (L. Nelson, S. Blanchard)
	4–2	54:46 – L. Nelson (A. Polaczek)

10 min
Penalties
4 min
35
Shots
30

==== Krefeld Pinguine vs. Eisbären Berlin ====
3 April 2013; 19:30	Krefeld Pinguine	2–3 (1–0, 1–3, 0–0)	Eisbären Berlin	König Palast; Attendance: 8,029

Game reference

Tomáš Duba
Goalies
Rob Zepp
Referees:
Stephan Bauer
Willi Schimm
Linesmen:
Thomas Gemeinhardt
Andre Schrader

H. Vasiļjevs (B. Blank, A. Driendl) – 03:42	1–0
	1–1	24:24 – M. Christensen (J. Arniel, J. Baxmann)
	1–2	29:52 – T. J. Mulock (J. Talbot, A. Rankel)
	1–3	38:48 – A. Rankel (T. J. Mulock, C. Braun)
H. Vasiļjevs (M. Robar, S. Hanusch) – 39:31	2–3

10 min
Penalties
14 min
29
Shots
31

5 April 2013; 19:30	Eisbären Berlin	5–2 (1–1, 4–1, 0–0)	Krefeld Pinguine	O_{2} World; Attendance: 14,200

Game reference

Rob Zepp
Goalies
Tomáš Duba
Referees:
Lars Brüggemann
Florian Zehetleitner
Linesmen:
Thomas Gemeinhardt
Andre Schrader

M. Christensen (C. Braun, T. J. Mulock) – 14:12	1–0
	1–1	19:49 – K. Clark (F. Méthot, S. Hanusch)
C. Braun (J. Talbot, A. Rankel) (PP) – 22:13	2–1
J. Talbot (T. J. Mulock, C. Braun) (PP2 – 24:38	3–1
	3–2	32:31 – M. Robar (D. Pietta) (PP)
C. Locke (M. Foy, L. Braun) – 36:25	4–2
M. Christensen (J. Arniel, C. Braun) – 37:17	5–2

12 min
Penalties
14 min
45
Shots
28

7 April 2013; 14:30	Krefeld Pinguine	3–4 (0–2, 2–1, 1–1)	Eisbären Berlin	König Palast; Attendance: 8,029

Game reference

Tomáš Duba
Goalies
Rob Zepp
Referees:
Lars Brüggemann
Daniel Piechaczek
Linesmen:
Andreas Kowert
Alexander Schelewski

	0–1	11:49 – F. Hördler (J. Talbot, C. Braun)
	0–2	16:26 – B. Tallackson (D. Olver, J. Talbot) (PP)
K. Clark (F. Méthot, T. Kůrka) – 22:26	1–2
R. Verwey (D. Pietta, M. Schymainski) – 26:28	2–2
	2–3	29:29 – J. Baxmann (J. Talbot, A. Rankel)
	2–4	42:11 – F. Busch (M. Christensen, J. Sharrow)
H. Vasiļjevs (S. Akdag, B. Blank) (SH) – 43:07	3–4

12 min
Penalties
8 min
22
Shots
30

=== Final ===
The final were played between 14 and 24 April 2013 in a Best-of-five mode.

==== Kölner Haie vs. Eisbären Berlin ====
14 April 2013; 14:30	Kölner Haie	2–4 (0–1, 1–1, 1–2)	Eisbären Berlin	Lanxess Arena; Attendance: 18,366

Game reference

Danny aus den Birken
Goalies
Rob Zepp
Referees:
Daniel Piechaczek
Willi Schimm
Linesmen:
Thomas Gemeinhardt
Andre Schrader

	0–1	09:33 – J. Talbot (T. J. Mulock)
A. Falk (P. Gogulla, A. Holmqvist) – 22:42	1–1
	1–2	38:33 – T. J. Mulock (J. Talbot)
	1–3	46:19 – D. Olver
A. Falk (C. Stephens, J. Tripp) (EA) – 59:08	2–3
	2–4	59:31 – A. Rankel (ENG)

18 min
Penalties
6 min
32
Shots
39

16 April 2013; 20:30	Eisbären Berlin	1–3 (1–2, 0–0, 0–1)	Kölner Haie	O_{2} World; Attendance: 14,200

Game reference

Rob Zepp
Goalies
Danny aus den Birken
Referees:
Lars Brüggemann
Stephan Bauer
Linesmen:
Sirko Hunnius
Nikolaj Ponomarjow

	0–1	01:01 – M. Sturm (A. Holmqvist, F. Schütz) (PP)
R. Caldwell (A. Rankel, C. Braun) (PP) – 02:49	1–1
	1–2	08:26 – A. Falk (P. Gogulla)
	1–3	41:44 – C. Stephens (J. Tripp, N. Robinson)

12 min
Penalties
14 min
27
Shots
43

19 April 2013; 20:30	Kölner Haie	3–6 (1–1, 0–3, 2–2)	Eisbären Berlin	Lanxess Arena; Attendance: 18,649

Game reference

Danny aus den Birken
Goalies
Rob Zepp
Referees:
Lars Brüggemann
Daniel Piechaczek
Linesmen:
Thomas Gemeinhardt
Andre Schrader

	0–1	01:24 – J. Talbot (F. Hördler, F. Busch) (PP)
R. Tičar (M. Ohmann, A. Holmqvist) – 04:39	1–1
	1–2	21:51 – J. Sharrow (F. Busch, B. Tallackson)
	1–3	30:44 – M. Katic (C. Locke, J. Arniel)
	1–4	35:13 – M. Christensen (M. Foy, R. Caldwell)
A. Kranjc (N. Robinson, J. Tripp) (EA) – 56:44	2–4
M. Sturm (J. Tripp, C. Stephens) (EA) – 57:19	3–4
	3–5	58:45 – A. Rankel (J. Talbot, T. J. Mulock) (ENG)
	3–6	59:58 – M. Christensen (ENG)

14 min
Penalties
18 min
34
Shots
29

21 April 2013; 14:30	Eisbären Berlin	4–1 (1–0, 2–1, 1–0)	Kölner Haie	O_{2} World; Attendance: 14,200

Game reference

Rob Zepp
Goalies
Danny aus den Birken
Referees:
Lars Brüggemann
Daniel Piechaczek
Linesmen:
Nikolaj Ponomarjow
Sirko Hunnius

C. Locke (PS) – 08:46	1–0
	1–1	24:50 – R. Tičar (G. Claaßen, A. Holmqvist)
J. Talbot (D. Olver) – 31:32	2–1
T. J. Mulock (C. Braun) – 34:31	3–1
J. Talbot (B. Tallackson, C. Locke) – 46:36	4–1

10 min
Penalties
16 min
34
Shots
31
