= Verweij =

Verweij or Verwey is a Dutch toponymic surname. It is a contraction of "van der Weij" (modern Dutch: van de weide), meaning "from the meadow". Notable people with the surname include:

Verweij

- Ben Verweij (1895–1951), Dutch footballer
- Bull Verweij (1909–2010), Dutch businessman
- Geoffrey Verweij (born 1982), Dutch footballer
- Johan Verweij (born 1950s), New Zealand footballer
- Koen Verweij (born 1990), Dutch speed skater
- Michiel Verweij (born 1964), Dutch classical scholar and historian

Verwey

- Albert Verwey (1865–1937), Dutch poet
- Alvaro Verwey (born 1999), Surinamese football forward
- Bobby Verwey (born 1941), South African golfer
- Evert Verwey (1905–1981), Dutch physical chemist
- John Verwey (born 1957), Canadian darts player
- Kees Verwey (1900–1995), Dutch painter
- Roland Verwey (born 1981), German ice hockey player
- Tobias Verwey (born 1981), Namibian cricketer

== See also ==
- Verwey transition, a mineral phase transition named after Evert Verwey
- Deryagin-Landau and Verwey-Overbeck theory, a colloidal chemistry theory named for Evert Verwey
- Jordaan v Verwey, a South African contract case law
