= Dotzler =

Dotzler is a surname. Notable people with the surname include:

- Alexander Dotzler (born 1984), German professional ice hockey defenseman
- Nick Dotzler (born 1997), professional inline hockey player
- Michael Dotzler (born 1962), professional baseball player
- Gerhardt Dotzler (born 1933), U.S. collegiate hall of fame wrestler
- Hannes Dotzler (born 1990), German cross country skier
- Stefan Dotzler (born 1960), German cross country skier
- William Dotzler (born 1948), US-Politician from Waterloo, Iowa
