= Whitecotton (surname) =

Whitecotton is a surname.

People with the surname include:

- Dustin Whitecotton (born 1979), Canadian ice hockey player and coach
- James H. Whitecotton (born 1854), American politician who served as Speaker of the Missouri House of Representatives
- Joseph Whitecotton (born 1937), American academic anthropologist and ethnohistorian
- Margaret Whitecotton, named plaintiff in the U.S. Supreme Court vaccine law case Shalala v. Whitecotton
- William Whitecotton (fl. 1910s–1940s), owner of the Whitecotton Hotel
