= Aleksander Polaczek =

- Born: August 9, 1980 (age 44); Opole, Poland
- Height: 5 ft 10 in (178 cm)
- Weight: 183 lb (83 kg; 13 st 1 lb)
- Position: Forward
- Shot: Left
- Played for: ERC Ingolstadt; Nürnberg Ice Tigers; Frankfurt Lions; Hamburg Freezers; Grizzly Adams Wolfsburg; Augsburger Panther
- National team: Germany
- Playing career: 1999–2018

Aleksander Polaczek (born, August 9, 1980) is a Polish born former professional ice hockey forward who played in the Deutsche Eishockey Liga (DEL).

== Playing career ==
After playing with the Frankfurt Lions in their final season in 2010, Polaczek signed a one-year contract with the Hamburg Freezers. On February 9, 2011, Polaczek signed a one-year extension with the Freezers to remain through to the 2011–12 season.

Producing only 12 points in a diminished role in 52 games, Polaczek was released as a free agent and signed a one-year deal with Grizzly Adams Wolfsburg on April 2, 2012.

After three seasons with Wolfsburg, Polaczek signed a one-year contract with fellow German club, Augsburger Panther on April 8, 2015.

Upon completion of the 2017–18 season with Augsburger, Polaczek ended his professional career after 19 seasons.

== Career statistics ==
=== Regular season and playoffs ===
| | | | Regular season | | | | | Playoffs |
| Season | Team | League | GP | G | A | Pts | PIM | GP | G | A | Pts | PIM |
|---|---|---|---|---|---|---|---|---|---|---|---|---|
| 1999–00 | Ulm/Neu-Ulm | 3.GBun | 55 | 14 | 2 | 16 | 93 | — | — | — | — | — |
| 2000–01 | ESV Bayreuth | 3.GBun | 41 | 9 | 17 | 26 | 140 | — | — | — | — | — |
| 2001–02 | REV Bremerhaven | 2.GBun | 49 | 9 | 8 | 17 | 148 | 4 | 2 | 0 | 2 | 4 |
| 2002–03 | Fischtown Pinguins | 2.GBun | 31 | 4 | 3 | 7 | 52 | — | — | — | — | — |
| 2003–04 | ERC Ingolstadt | DEL | 50 | 5 | 3 | 8 | 40 | 9 | 1 | 0 | 1 | 2 |
| 2004–05 | ERC Ingolstadt | DEL | 52 | 3 | 8 | 11 | 34 | 8 | 0 | 1 | 1 | 4 |
| 2005–06 | Nürnberg Ice Tigers | DEL | 52 | 3 | 9 | 12 | 64 | 4 | 0 | 0 | 0 | 14 |
| 2006–07 | Nürnberg Ice Tigers | DEL | 49 | 7 | 13 | 20 | 96 | 13 | 1 | 1 | 2 | 30 |
| 2007–08 | Nürnberg Ice Tigers | DEL | 55 | 14 | 5 | 19 | 110 | 5 | 0 | 0 | 0 | 12 |
| 2008–09 | Nürnberg Ice Tigers | DEL | 43 | 9 | 8 | 17 | 101 | 5 | 2 | 1 | 3 | 8 |
| 2009–10 | Frankfurt Lions | DEL | 54 | 8 | 11 | 19 | 62 | 4 | 0 | 0 | 0 | 2 |
| 2010–11 | Hamburg Freezers | DEL | 51 | 11 | 14 | 25 | 90 | — | — | — | — | — |
| 2011–12 | Hamburg Freezers | DEL | 52 | 4 | 8 | 12 | 58 | 5 | 1 | 0 | 1 | 8 |
| 2012–13 | Grizzly Adams Wolfsburg | DEL | 48 | 8 | 13 | 21 | 48 | 12 | 2 | 3 | 5 | 6 |
| 2013–14 | Grizzly Adams Wolfsburg | DEL | 45 | 7 | 4 | 11 | 53 | 4 | 1 | 0 | 1 | 6 |
| 2014–15 | Grizzly Adams Wolfsburg | DEL | 50 | 6 | 5 | 11 | 86 | 9 | 1 | 1 | 2 | 8 |
| 2015–16 | Augsburger Panther | DEL | 51 | 6 | 3 | 9 | 109 | — | — | — | — | — |
| 2016–17 | Augsburger Panther | DEL | 52 | 4 | 5 | 9 | 30 | 7 | 1 | 0 | 1 | 2 |
| 2017–18 | Augsburger Panther | DEL | 44 | 1 | 3 | 4 | 38 | — | — | — | — | — |
| DEL totals | | | 748 | 96 | 112 | 208 | 1019 | 85 | 10 | 7 | 17 | 102 |

=== International ===
| Year | Team | Event | Result | GP | G | A | Pts | PIM |
|---|---|---|---|---|---|---|---|---|
| 2007 | Germany | WC | 9th | 3 | 0 | 0 | 0 | 2 |
| Senior totals | | | | 3 | 0 | 0 | 0 | 2 |
