= Tomáš Duba =

Czech ice hockey player (born 1981)

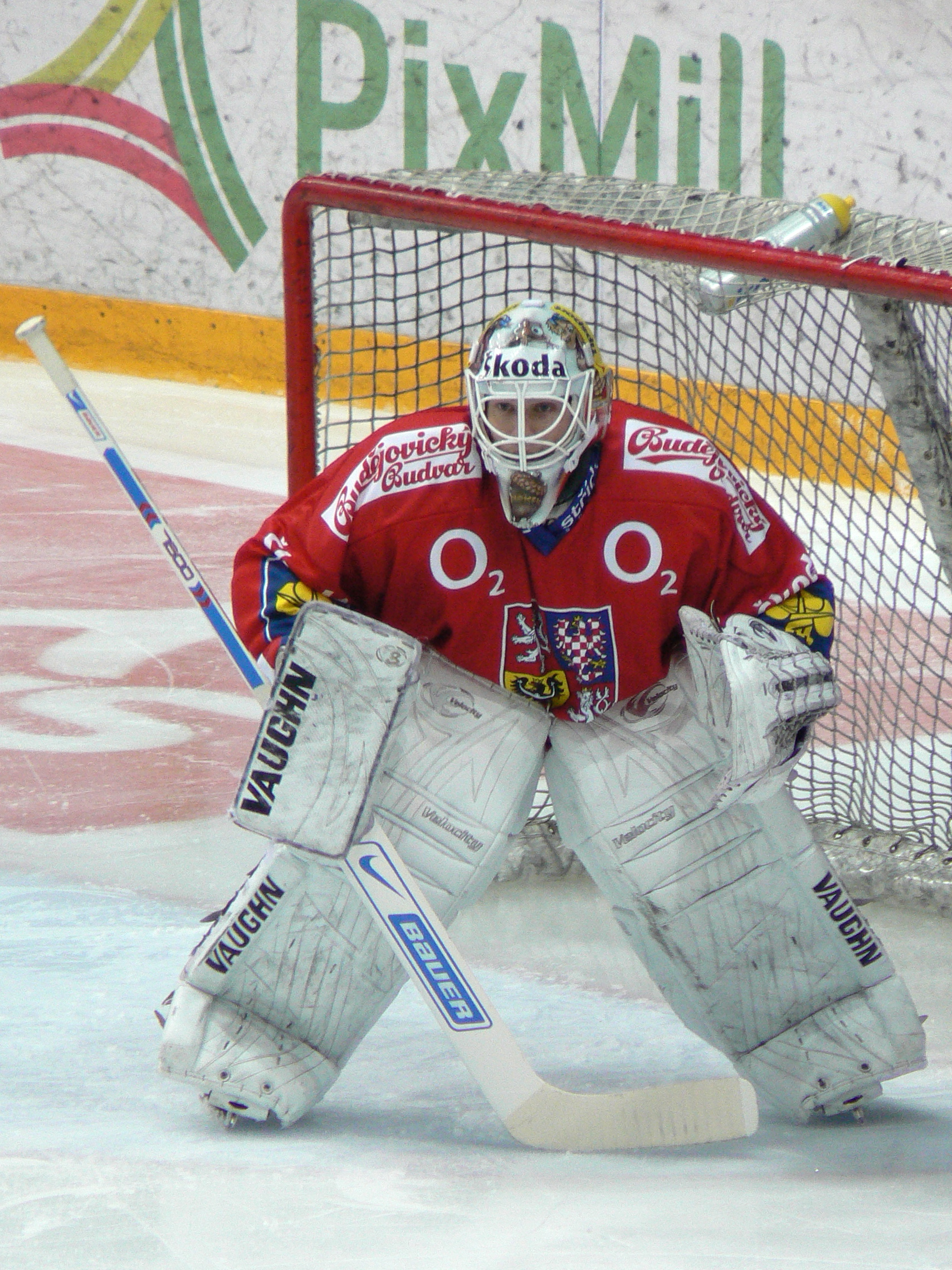
- Born: July 2, 1981 (age 44) Czechoslovakia
- Height: 6 ft 0 in (183 cm)
- Weight: 169 lb (77 kg; 12 st 1 lb)
- Position: Goaltender
- Caught: Left
- Played for: SaiPa; HC Znojemsti Orli; HC Plzeň; Leksands IF; TPS; HC Sparta Praha; Ässät; HC Oceláři Třinec; HC Zlin; Lev Poprad; HC Bolzano; Krefeld Pinguine; EC KAC; High1; Sheffield Steelers
- NHL draft: 217th overall, 2001; Pittsburgh Penguins
- Playing career: 2000–2020

Tomáš Duba (born July 2, 1981, in Prague, Czechoslovakia) is a retired Czech professional ice hockey goaltender, who last played for Sheffield Steelers in the British Elite Ice Hockey League (EIHL).

== Playing career ==
Whilst with HC Sparta Praha as a youth, Duba was drafted in the seventh round of the NHL, 217th overall, by the Pittsburgh Penguins in the 2001 NHL entry draft.

After playing with Ässät of the Finnish SM-liiga, Duba returned on May 1, 2009, back to his native Czech Republic and signed with HC Oceláři Třinec.

On January 20, 2013, Duba left Bolzano HC and signed for the remainder of the 2012–13 season, with Krefeld Pinguine of the German DEL. He then stayed with the Krefeld team through the 2015–16 season. In April 2016, he inked with EC KAC of the Austrian league EBEL.

In August 2019, Duba moved to UK EIHL side Sheffield Steelers. Duba quickly won admiration among Steelers fans, becoming something of a cult figure for his seemingly perennial smile, and, on 8 March 2020, he was part of the Sheffield Steelers team that won the 2020 Challenge Cup with a 4–3 victory over the Cardiff Devils.

In November 2020, Duba hung up his skates - becoming the goaltending coach for Finnish side PEPO.

== International play ==
Duba appeared for the Czech national junior team (Under 20) in the 2000 Junior World Championships and 2001 Junior World Championships in Sweden and Moscow respectively. In 2001 Championships he won an award for the best goalie, while playing for SaiPa in Finland's SM-liiga. After this date, he has played for the Czech national team.
