= Patrick Köppchen =

German ice hockey player

- Born: 21 June 1980 (age 45) Berlin, Germany
- Height: 5 ft 11 in (180 cm)
- Weight: 194 lb (88 kg; 13 st 12 lb)
- Position: Defence
- Shot: Left
- Played for: München Barons; Hamburg Freezers; Hannover Scorpions; ERC Ingolstadt; Nürnberg Ice Tigers; Düsseldorfer EG
- National team: Germany
- Playing career: 2001–2020

Patrick Köppchen (born 21 June 1980) is a German former professional ice hockey defenceman. He most recently played for Düsseldorfer EG in the Deutsche Eishockey Liga (DEL). He previously played with fellow DEL teams Nürnberg Ice Tigers, ERC Ingolstadt, Hamburg Freezers, Hannover Scorpions and Munich Barons.

== Playing career ==
A Berlin native and product of Eisbären Berlin, Köppchen spent the 1997-98 season in the Manitoba Junior Hockey League, playing for the Neepawa Natives. He made his debut in Germany's elite league DEL for the Munich Barons during the 2000-01 season. The Barons relocated to Hamburg in 2002 and became the Hamburg Freezers. Between 2004 and 2011, Köppchen played for the Hannover Scorpions and helped guide the team to the 2010 German championship. He returned to the Hamburg Freezers in 2011.

On 6 April 2013 Köppchen left the Freezers after two seasons and signed a one-year contract with ERC Ingolstadt. Serving as a team captain, he won the German championship with ERC in 2014 and was named MVP of the playoffs.

He parted ways with ERC Ingolstadt in July 2017 and signed with fellow DEL club Nürnberg Ice Tigers. Köppchen reached the playoff-semis with Nürnberg in the 2017–18 season, before in May 2018, he left and was signed as a free agent to a one-year deal with Düsseldorfer EG.

== International play ==
Köppchen competed at the 2002 IIHF World Championship and the 2015 IIHF World Championship as a member of Germany men's national ice hockey team.

== Career statistics ==
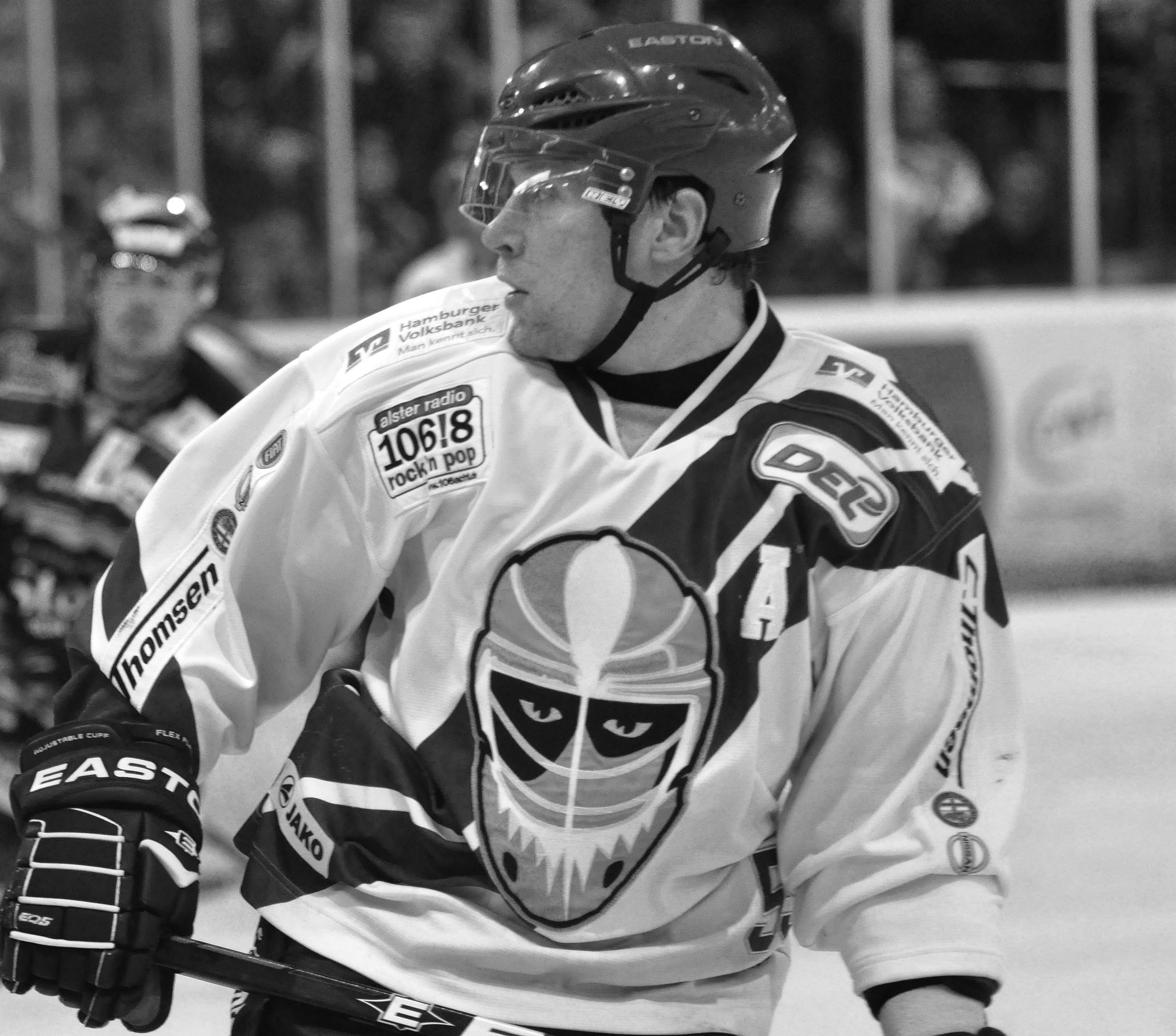
Köppchen during his tenure with the Freezers.

=== Regular season and playoffs ===
			Regular season					Playoffs
Season	Team	League	GP	G	A	Pts	PIM	GP	G	A	Pts	PIM
1998–99	EHC Braunlager	2.GBun	51	1	4	5	54	4	0	0	0	2
1999–00	TSV Erding	3.GBun	63	7	30	37	82	—	—	—	—	—
2000–01	TSV Erding	2.GBun	39	8	16	24	88	6	3	5	8	2
2000–01	München Barons	DEL	4	0	1	1	0	1	0	0	0	0
2001–02	München Barons	DEL	59	3	4	7	32	9	0	0	0	8
2002–03	Hamburg Freezers	DEL	52	2	5	7	34	5	0	0	0	0
2003–04	Hamburg Freezers	DEL	49	1	5	6	24	10	0	1	1	4
2004–05	Hannover Scorpions	DEL	49	4	13	17	38	—	—	—	—	—
2005–06	Hannover Scorpions	DEL	52	2	16	18	66	10	1	5	6	14
2006–07	Hannover Scorpions	DEL	22	2	9	11	10	6	0	1	1	2
2007–08	Hannover Scorpions	DEL	55	1	16	17	36	3	0	0	0	4
2008–09	Hannover Scorpions	DEL	52	2	13	15	24	11	0	1	1	6
2009–10	Hannover Scorpions	DEL	56	2	8	10	24	11	0	2	2	2
2010–11	Hannover Scorpions	DEL	52	1	17	18	28	5	0	3	3	2
2011–12	Hamburg Freezers	DEL	52	1	19	20	34	5	0	0	0	4
2012–13	Hamburg Freezers	DEL	52	1	25	26	34	6	0	2	2	6
2013–14	ERC Ingolstadt	DEL	52	4	8	12	26	21	4	10	14	6
2014–15	ERC Ingolstadt	DEL	52	3	16	19	42	18	0	3	3	2
2015–16	ERC Ingolstadt	DEL	43	1	6	7	14	2	0	1	1	0
2016–17	ERC Ingolstadt	DEL	50	3	18	21	16	2	0	0	0	4
2017–18	Thomas Sabo Ice Tigers	DEL	37	0	10	10	12	12	1	5	6	0
2018–19	Düsseldorfer EG	DEL	46	0	6	6	18	—	—	—	—	—
DEL totals			886	33	215	248	512	137	6	34	40	76

=== International ===
Year	Team	Event	GP	G	A	Pts	PIM
1997	Germany	EJC18	6	0	1	1	0
1998	Germany	EJC18	5	3	2	5	14
1999	Germany	WJC-D1	6	0	2	2	20
2000	Germany	WJC-D1	5	2	0	2	4
2002	Germany	WC	7	0	0	0	0
2015	Germany	WC	7	0	0	0	0
Junior totals			22	5	5	10	38
Senior totals			14	0	0	0	0
