= Colin Murphy (ice hockey) =

Canadian ice hockey player

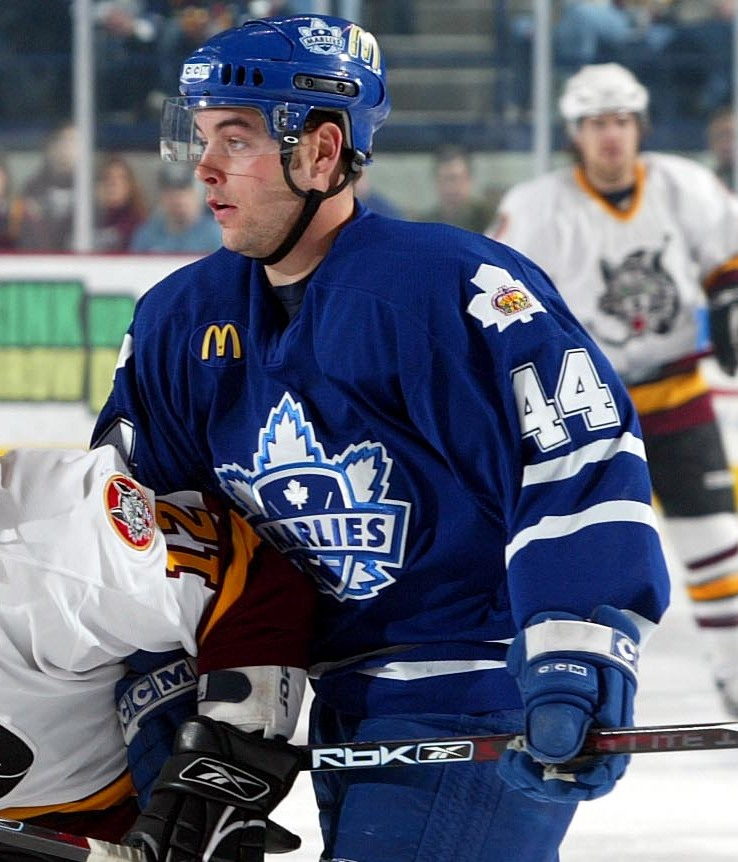
- Murphy with the Toronto Marlies in 2007
- Born: April 11, 1980 (age 45) Fort McMurray, Alberta, Canada
- Height: 6 ft 0 in (183 cm)
- Weight: 195 lb (88 kg; 13 st 13 lb)
- Position: Left wing
- Shot: Left
- Played for: St. John's Maple Leafs; Toronto Marlies; Portland Pirates; Augsburger Panther; Hamburg Freezers
- NHL draft: Undrafted
- Playing career: 2005–2013

Colin Murphy (born April 11, 1980) is a former Canadian professional ice hockey player who played in the American Hockey League and Deutsche Eishockey Liga.

== Playing career ==
Growing up on Alderwood in Abasand in the 1990s, the Family Garage door was dented from numerous puck strikes during the winter from his Two Brothers and himself, relentless in the Pursuit of Greatness. Summers were spent playing ball hockey from garage to garage down the narrow street from 108 Alderwood. He owned the 'net'.

Undrafted, Murphy played collegiate hockey with Michigan Tech of the Western Collegiate Hockey Association. Scoring at a point per game pace with 152 points in 145 games, Murphy was signed as a free agent by the Toronto Maple Leafs on September 14, 2005.

Murphy made his professional debut upon completion of his college career, playing the Leafs affiliate the St. John's Maple Leafs at the end of the 2004–05 season. Colin started his first full pro season in 2005–06 and became the first player to score for new leafs affiliate, the Toronto Marlies.

On August 4, 2008, Murphy was signed by the Buffalo Sabres as an unrestricted free agent. He was then assigned to affiliate, the Portland Pirates for the 2008–09 season.

On May 11, 2009, Murphy signed a one-year contract with German team, Augsburger Panther. Colin finished second on the Panthers in scoring with 57 points for the 2009–10 season before signing with fellow DEL team the Hamburg Freezers on June 28, 2010.

== Awards and honours ==
Award	Year
All-WCHA First Team	2004–05
AHCA West Second-Team All-American	2004–05
Wood Buffalo Sports Hall of Fame	2015

== Career statistics ==
			Regular season					Playoffs
Season	Team	League	GP	G	A	Pts	PIM	GP	G	A	Pts	PIM
2001–02	Michigan Tech	WCHA	38	8	19	27	40	—	—	—	—	—
2002–03	Michigan Tech	WCHA	37	20	20	40	42	—	—	—	—	—
2003–04	Michigan Tech	WCHA	33	15	17	32	28	—	—	—	—	—
2004–05	Michigan Tech	WCHA	37	11	42	53	40	—	—	—	—	—
2004–05	St. John's Maple Leafs	AHL	12	1	7	8	34	5	1	3	4	7
2005–06	Toronto Marlies	AHL	53	16	18	34	44	4	0	0	0	0
2006–07	Toronto Marlies	AHL	73	20	36	56	126	—	—	—	—	—
2007–08	Toronto Marlies	AHL	68	11	27	38	152	11	2	3	5	34
2008–09	Portland Pirates	AHL	50	13	17	30	50	5	0	0	0	4
2009–10	Augsburger Panther	DEL	53	19	38	57	90	14	2	9	11	18
2010–11	Hamburg Freezers	DEL	51	18	30	48	40	—	—	—	—	—
2011–12	Hamburg Freezers	DEL	18	4	4	8	28	—	—	—	—	—
2012–13	Hamburg Freezers	DEL	32	8	8	16	24	6	1	4	5	20
AHL totals			256	61	105	166	406	25	3	6	9	55
