= Ian Gordon (ice hockey) =

Canadian-born German ice hockey player

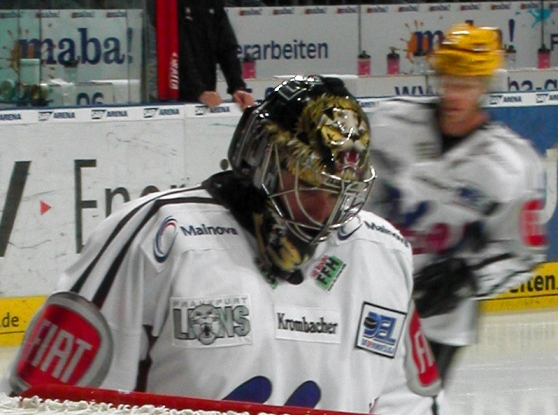
- Born: May 15, 1975 (age 49); North Battleford, Saskatchewan, Canada
- Height: 5 ft 10 in (178 cm)
- Weight: 170 lb (77 kg; 12 st 2 lb)
- Position: Goaltender
- Caught: Left
- Played for: Saint John Flames; Grand Rapids Griffins; Cleveland Lumberjacks; Utah Grizzlies; SERC Wild Wings; Frankfurt Lions; ERC Ingolstadt
- NHL draft: Undrafted
- Playing career: 1995–2013

Ian Gordon (born May 15, 1975) is a Canadian-born German former professional ice hockey goaltender who last played for ERC Ingolstadt of the Deutsche Eishockey Liga.

== Career ==
After playing in the American Hockey League and the International Hockey League, Gordon moved to Germany in 2000, when he signed with the SERC Wild Wings. After three seasons, he transferred to the Frankfurt Lions in 2003, won the German title with the Lions in his first season in Frankfurt, and remained with the team until 2010 when the Lions folded due to financial difficulties. Gordon became a naturalized German citizen on November 18, 2008.

On July 7, 2010, Gordon signed a contract with Ingolstadt. Gordon announced his retirement after the 2012–13 season.
