= Brian Roloff =

American ice hockey player (born 1986)

- Born: August 8, 1986 (age 40) West Seneca, New York, U.S.
- Height: 5 ft 10 in (178 cm)
- Weight: 185 lb (84 kg; 13 st 3 lb)
- Position: Center
- Shot: Left
- Played for: Providence Bruins; Portland Pirates; Augsburger Panther; Ravensburg Towerstars
- NHL draft: Undrafted
- Playing career: 2010–2018

Brian Roloff on the ice during a skirmish

Brian Roloff (born August 8, 1986) is an American ice hockey forward who is currently playing for the Ravensburg Towerstars in Germany's DEL2 league.

== Career ==
Roloff was raised in West Seneca, New York. Before turning professional, he spent two seasons playing junior hockey in the United States Hockey League (USHL) with the Green Bay Gamblers, followed by four years of collegiate hockey at the University of Vermont, where he played for the Vermont Catamounts men's ice hockey team. After finishing his college career, Roloff made his professional debut with five appearances for the Providence Bruins in the AHL after the 2009–10 AHL season. The next year, he signed an AHL Standard Player's Contract with the Portland Pirates.

In 2011, Roloff made the decision to continue his professional hockey career overseas, signing with the Augsburg Panthers, a club competing in the Deutsche Eishockey Liga (DEL), the highest level of professional ice hockey in Germany. Throughout three seasons with the Panthers, Roloff established himself as a key contributor to the team's offense and adapted well to the European style of play. However, during his third season in the Panthers, his progress was hindered by a shoulder injury, which limited his ability to play at full strength. Looking for a fresh start, Roloff joined the Ravensburg Towerstars, a club competing in Germany's second-tier league, the DEL2, ahead of the 2014–15 season. In his debut year with Ravensburg, he made an immediate impact, appearing in 54 games while scoring 25 goals and recording 27 assists. Impressed by his contributions, the Towerstars rewarded him with a contract extension, securing his services for the 2015–16 season.

== Career statistics ==
			Regular season					Playoffs
Season	Team	League	GP	G	A	Pts	PIM	GP	G	A	Pts	PIM
2006–07	University of Vermont	NCAA	38	4	5	9	24	—	—	—	—	—
2007–08	University of Vermont	NCAA	29	3	11	14	8	—	—	—	—	—
2008–09	University of Vermont	NCAA	39	10	19	29	14	—	—	—	—	—
2009–10	University of Vermont	NCAA	39	9	18	27	24	—	—	—	—	—
2009–10	Providence Bruins	AHL	5	0	1	1	2	—	—	—	—	—
2010–11	Portland Pirates	AHL	76	4	20	24	20	7	0	1	1	2
2011–12	Augsburger Panther	DEL	49	13	26	39	29	2	0	1	1	0
2012–13	Augsburger Panther	DEL	46	7	17	24	16	2	0	2	2	2
2013–14	Augsburger Panther	DEL	26	1	5	6	14	—	—	—	—	—
2014–15	Ravensburg Towerstars	DEL2	52	23	27	60	14	4	2	0	2	4
2015–16	Ravensburg Towerstars	DEL2	52	19	51	70	34	11	4	7	11	4
2016–17	Ravensburg Towerstars	DEL2	41	8	15	23	12	—	—	—	—	—
2017–18	Ravensburg Towerstars	DEL2	48	17	31	48	26	2	0	3	3	0
AHL totals			81	4	21	25	22	7	0	1	1	2
DEL totals			121	21	48	69	59	4	0	3	3	2
DEL2 totals			193	67	134	201	86	17	6	10	16	8
