= Aaron Brocklehurst =

Canadian ice hockey player

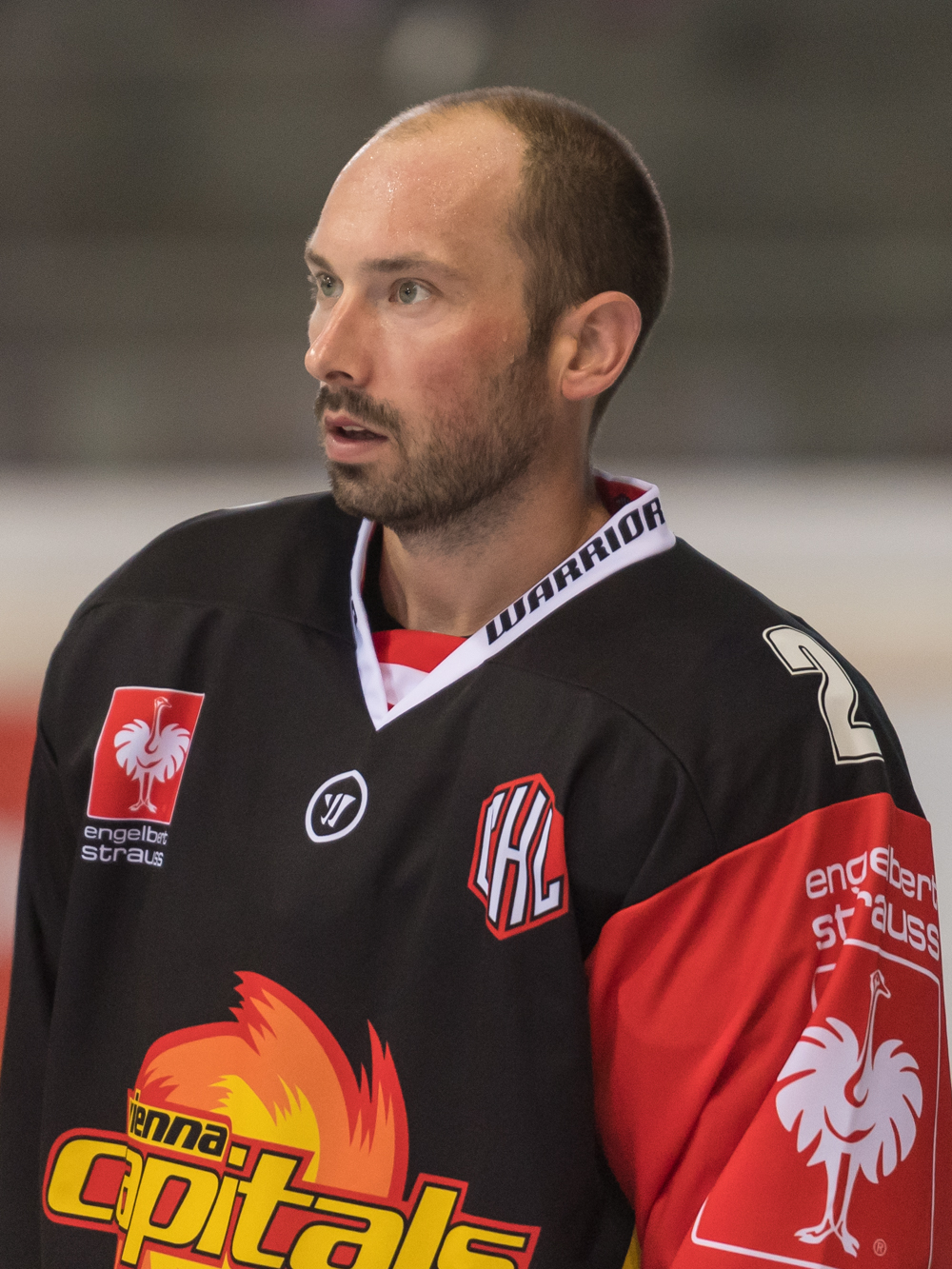
- Born: June 10, 1985 (age 41) Nanaimo, British Columbia, Canada
- Height: 5 ft 11 in (180 cm)
- Weight: 194 lb (88 kg; 13 st 12 lb)
- Position: Defence
- Shot: Left
- Played for: Lake Erie Monsters; Lukko; Pelicans; Grizzly Adams Wolfsburg; ERC Ingolstadt; Alba Volán Székesfehérvár; Hamburg Freezers; Vienna Capitals; EHC Black Wings Linz; Sheffield Steelers
- NHL draft: Undrafted
- Playing career: 2008–2020

Aaron Brocklehurst (born June 10, 1985) is a Canadian professional ice hockey defenceman who last played for the Sheffield Steelers of the Elite Ice Hockey League (EIHL).

== Career ==
After playing in the BCHL, Brocklehurst enrolled at St. Cloud State University in 2004.

He turned pro in 2008 and signed with the Florida Everblades of the ECHL, before transferring to fellow ECHL outfit Victoria Salmon Kings. His 2008-09 season also included a brief stint at AHL's Lake Erie Monsters.

Brocklehurst gained more ECHL experience during the 2009-10 campaign, suiting up for the Gwinnett Gladiators and the Reading Royals.

In the 2010–11 season, Brocklehurst left for Europe and signed with Lukko of the Finnish SM-liiga. After a mid-season transfer to Pelicans, Brocklehurst extended for a further one-year extension. On June 8, 2012, Brocklehurst left Finland and signed a one-year contract in Germany with EHC Wolfsburg of the DEL.

Whilst leading the Wolfsburg defence with 30 points in 48 games during the 2012–13 season, Brocklehurst was re-signed to a one-year extension on February 13, 2013. After two successful and productive seasons from the Grizzly Adams blueline, Brocklehurst opted to transfer to fellow DEL club, ERC Ingolstadt on May 12, 2014.

After one season with Ingolstadt, Brocklehurst left the DEL for the neighbouring league, the EBEL, signing a one-year contract with Hungarian club, Alba Volán Székesfehérvár on July 9, 2015. However, he parted company with the club during the season and headed back to Germany: In February 2016, he agreed on a deal with the Hamburg Freezers for the remainder of the 2015-16 season.

Brocklehurst returned to the EBEL for the 2016–17 season, signing with the Vienna Capitals on July 6, 2016. Brocklehurst remained with the Capitals for two seasons before agreeing to terms with his third EBEL club, EHC Black Wings Linz, on April 16, 2018. In the 2018–19 season with the Black Wings, Brocklehurst continued to contribute from the blueline, posting 6 goals and 28 points in 52 games. He opted to not take up the option of his contract with the Black Wings and left as a free agent following a quarterfinal playoff defeat.

On July 12, 2019, Brocklehurst agreed to a one-year contract with English EIHL club, the Sheffield Steelers.

== Career statistics ==
			Regular season					Playoffs
Season	Team	League	GP	G	A	Pts	PIM	GP	G	A	Pts	PIM
2002–03	Alberni Valley Bulldogs	BCHL	46	4	16	20	30	—	—	—	—	—
2003–04	Alberni Valley Bulldogs	BCHL	14	1	8	9	16	—	—	—	—	—
2003–04	Powell River Kings	BCHL	21	6	5	11	50	—	—	—	—	—
2003–04	Victoria Salsa	BCHL	56	14	26	40	88	5	0	3	3	5
2004–05	St. Cloud State University	WCHA	35	3	4	7	42	—	—	—	—	—
2005–06	St. Cloud State University	WCHA	41	5	18	23	30	—	—	—	—	—
2006–07	St. Cloud State University	WCHA	32	5	6	11	23	—	—	—	—	—
2007–08	St. Cloud State University	WCHA	40	4	18	22	24	—	—	—	—	—
2008–09	Florida Everblades	ECHL	37	4	16	20	30	—	—	—	—	—
2008–09	Lake Erie Monsters	AHL	4	0	0	0	0	—	—	—	—	—
2008–09	Victoria Salmon Kings	ECHL	23	2	7	9	14	9	2	3	5	10
2009–10	Gwinnett Gladiators	ECHL	40	8	11	19	47	—	—	—	—	—
2009–10	Reading Royals	ECHL	27	7	13	20	36	16	1	6	7	18
2010–11	Lukko	SM-l	24	2	11	13	32	—	—	—	—	—
2010–11	Pelicans	SM-l	29	5	6	11	55	—	—	—	—	—
2011–12	Pelicans	SM-l	44	7	12	19	51	17	0	5	5	2
2012–13	Grizzly Adams Wolfsburg	DEL	48	7	23	30	38	12	3	2	5	16
2013–14	Grizzly Adams Wolfsburg	DEL	52	5	22	27	42	11	0	3	3	4
2014–15	ERC Ingolstadt	DEL	49	6	15	21	60	15	2	2	4	8
2015–16	Alba Volán Székesfehérvár	EBEL	42	4	15	19	40	—	—	—	—	—
2015–16	Hamburg Freezers	DEL	8	0	0	0	4	—	—	—	—	—
2016–17	Vienna Capitals	EBEL	52	5	20	25	34	12	3	9	12	16
2017–18	Vienna Capitals	EBEL	54	3	27	30	58	11	0	5	5	5
2018–19	EHC Black Wings Linz	EBEL	52	6	22	28	50	6	1	3	4	8
2019–20	Sheffield Steelers	EIHL	47	2	32	34	74	—	—	—	—	—
AHL totals			4	0	0	0	0	—	—	—	—	—
ECHL totals			127	21	48	69	127	25	3	9	12	28
