= Jean-Francois Boucher =

Canadian ice hockey player

Jean-François Boucher
- Born: December 1, 1985 (age 40) Rosemère, Quebec, Canada
- Height: 6 ft 0 in (183 cm)
- Weight: 205 lb (93 kg; 14 st 9 lb)
- Position: Left wing
- Shoots: Left
- DEL team Former teams: Free Agent; ERC Ingolstadt; Kölner Haie
- NHL draft: Undrafted
- Playing career: 2008–present

Jean-François Boucher (born December 1, 1985) is a Canadian professional ice hockey winger. He is currently an unrestricted free agent who last played for Kölner Haie in the Deutsche Eishockey Liga (DEL).

== Playing career ==
Boucher attended Yale University where he played four seasons (2004 - 2008) of NCAA Division I men's hockey.

Undrafted, he made his professional debut in Germany playing with ERC Ingolstadt of the Deutsche Eishockey Liga during the 2008–09 season. After one season with Ingolstadt, recording just 4 points in 47 games, Boucher returned to North America and played semi-professionally in the LNAH with the Saint-Georges Cool FM 103.5.

After three seasons developing within Quebec, Boucher embarked on a return to Germany with ERC Ingolstadt from the 2012–13 season. Establishing himself amongst the forwards in a depth checking line role, Boucher remained with Ingolstadt and appeared in 172 games with the club.

On June 1, 2015, Boucher left ERC Ingolstadt to sign a one-year contract with fellow DEL club, Kölner Haie.

== Personal ==
He is the oldest child of Olympic speed skating champion Gaétan Boucher and his German wife.
