= Sebastian Osterloh =

German ice hockey player (born 1983)

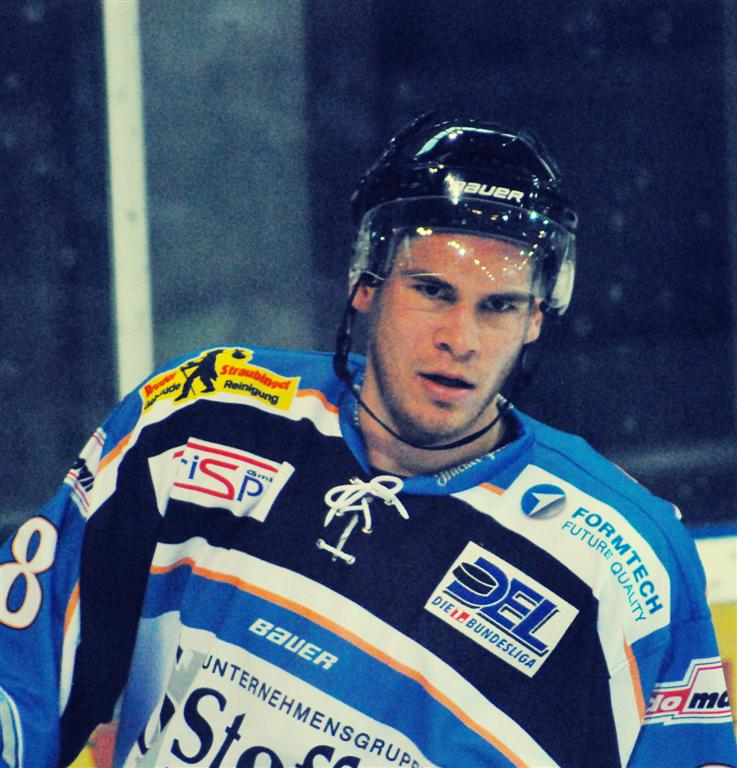
- Born: February 20, 1983 (age 42); Kaufbeuren, West Germany
- Height: 6 ft 1 in (185 cm)
- Weight: 203 lb (92 kg; 14 st 7 lb)
- Position: Defence
- Shot: Left
- DEL2 team Former teams: ESV Kaufbeuren; Grizzly Adams Wolfsburg; Kassel Huskies; Frankfurt Lions; Straubing Tigers
- National team: Germany
- Playing career: 2004–2019

Sebastian Osterloh (born February 20, 1983) is a German professional ice hockey defenceman. He is currently playing for ESV Kaufbeuren of the DEL2. He previously played with the Straubing Tigers in the Deutsche Eishockey Liga (DEL).

== Career statistics ==
			Regular season					Playoffs
Season	Team	League	GP	G	A	Pts	PIM	GP	G	A	Pts	PIM
1999–00	Kölner EC II	Germany4	12	3	4	7	6	—	—	—	—	—
1999–00	Kölner EC U18	Jugend-BL	24	19	16	35	91	—	—	—	—	—
1999–00	Kölner EC U20	Jugend-BL	30	3	8	11	51	—	—	—	—	—
2000–01	Kölner EC U18	DNL	6	1	5	6	37	—	—	—	—	—
2000–01	Kölner EC II	Germany4	27	11	17	28	85	11	3	5	8	34
2001–02	SC Mittelrhein-Neuwied	Germany3	50	3	5	8	105	—	—	—	—	—
2002–03	SC Mittelrhein-Neuwied	Germany3	53	7	18	25	78	3	0	0	0	4
2003–04	Straubing Tigers	Germany2	46	1	5	6	113	—	—	—	—	—
2004–05	Grizzly Adams Wolfsburg	DEL	49	1	2	3	70	—	—	—	—	—
2005–06	Kassel Huskies	DEL	33	3	1	4	71	—	—	—	—	—
2006–07	Frankfurt Lions	DEL	49	5	7	12	121	8	0	1	1	10
2007–08	Frankfurt Lions	DEL	50	3	4	7	74	9	0	1	1	14
2008–09	Frankfurt Lions	DEL	30	1	2	3	41	5	0	0	0	0
2009–10	Frankfurt Lions	DEL	53	1	7	8	81	4	0	0	0	6
2010–11	Straubing Tigers	DEL	15	0	2	2	18	—	—	—	—	—
2011–12	Straubing Tigers	DEL	40	3	3	6	18	8	1	4	5	18
2012–13	Straubing Tigers	DEL	51	2	12	14	40	7	1	1	2	16
2013–14	Straubing Tigers	DEL	44	1	5	6	78	—	—	—	—	—
2014–15	Straubing Tigers	DEL	41	2	4	6	24	—	—	—	—	—
2015–16	Straubing Tigers	DEL	45	1	4	5	32	6	0	0	0	26
2016–17	ESV Kaufbeuren	DEL2	43	6	13	19	64	1	0	0	0	0
2017–18	ESV Kaufbeuren	DEL2	35	2	8	10	48	11	1	4	5	18
2018–19	ESV Kaufbeuren	DEL2	12	0	3	3	18	—	—	—	—	—
DEL totals			500	23	53	76	668	47	2	7	9	90
