= Leonardo Conti (ice hockey) =

German ice hockey player

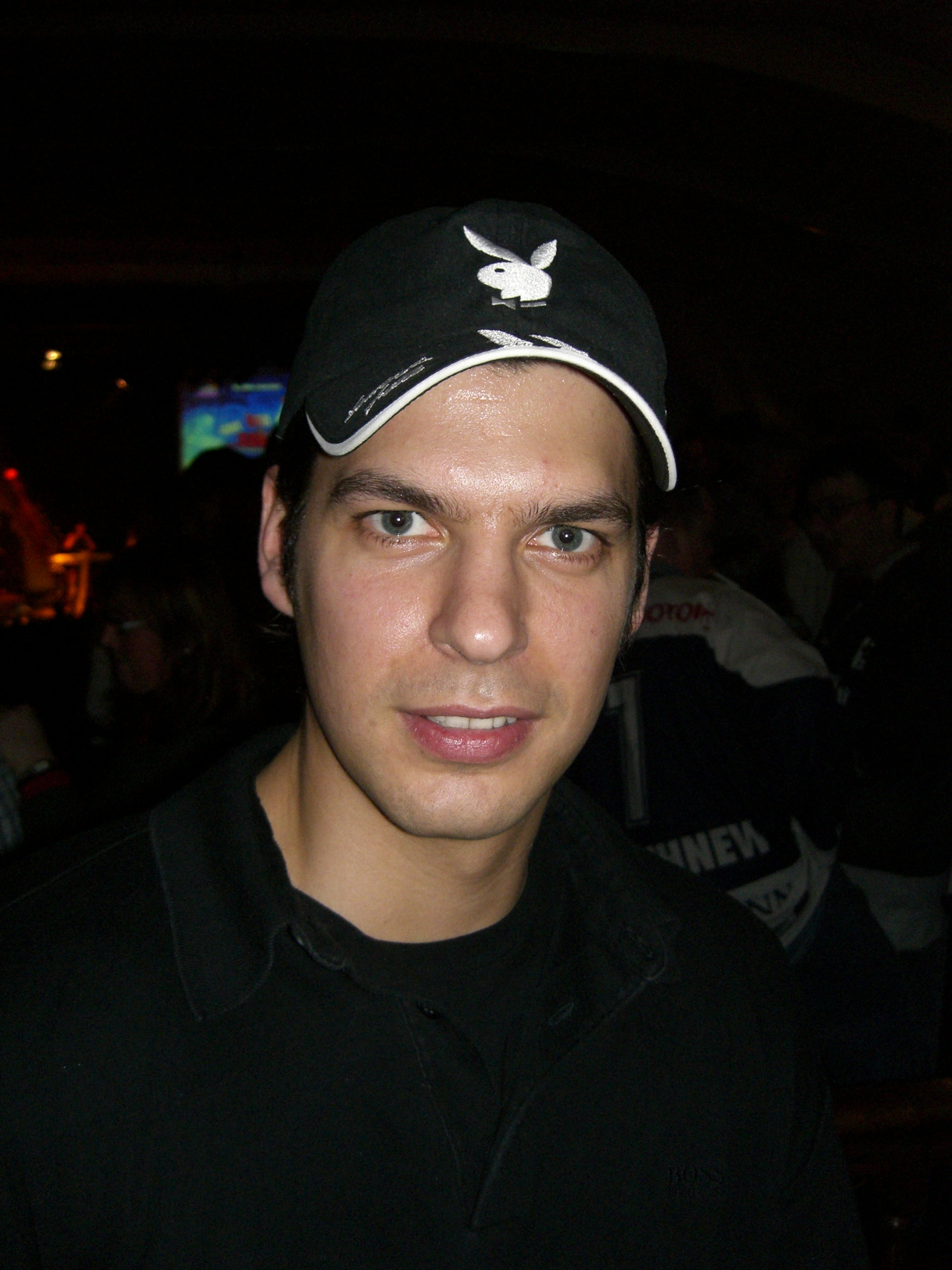
- Born: 15 September 1978 (age 46); Garmisch-Partenkirchen, West Germany
- Height: 6 ft 4 in (193 cm)
- Weight: 224 lb (102 kg; 16 st 0 lb)
- Position: Goaltender
- Caught: Left
- Played for: Augsburger Panther; Kassel Huskies; Frankfurt Lions; ERC Ingolstadt; Iserlohn Roosters
- National team: Germany
- Playing career: 1997–2013

Leonardo Conti (born 15 September 1978) is a German former professional ice hockey goaltender who played in the Deutsche Eishockey Liga.

== Playing career ==
Conti began his career with Augsburger Panther in 1995 for their junior team, eventually moving to the senior team two years later. In 1999, he moved to the Kassel Huskies for one season followed by two seasons with the Frankfurt Lions. In 2002, he spent a season in the 2nd Bundesliga for EC Bad Nauheim before splitting the 2003-04 season with seven games in the DEL for ERC Ingolstadt and one games in the 2nd Bundesliga with the Straubing Tigers. After two seasons with the Iserlohn Roosters, Conti moved to EV Ravensburg of the German Oberliga. They were promoted to the 2nd Bundesliga in 2007 but 2008 he returned to the Oberliga and moved to ESV Kaufbeuren. In 2009, he returned to the Augsburger Panther, ten years after his first spell.

After the conclusion of the 2012–13 season, Conti announced his retirement from an 18-year professional career.
