= Eric Schneider =

Canadian ice hockey player

- Born: September 15, 1977 (age 47); Calgary, Alberta, Canada
- Height: 6 ft 0 in (183 cm)
- Weight: 196 lb (89 kg; 14 st 0 lb)
- Position: Forward
- Shoots: Left
- ChHL team Former teams: Bentley Generals; Rochester Americans; Cleveland Barons; Saint John Flames; San Antonio Rampage; Utah Grizzlies; Hannover Scorpions; Frankfurt Lions; EHC München; Hamburg Freezers; Adler Mannheim
- NHL draft: Undrafted
- Playing career: 1999–present

Eric Schneider (born September 15, 1977) is a Canadian professional ice hockey player. He currently plays in the semi-professional Chinook Hockey League with the Bentley Generals. He last played professionally in the top German tier with Adler Mannheim of the Deutsche Eishockey Liga (DEL).

During the 2002–03 CHL season, Schneider represented the Laredo Bucks in the CHL All-Star game.

== Career statistics ==
			Regular season					Playoffs
Season	Team	League	GP	G	A	Pts	PIM	GP	G	A	Pts	PIM
1995–96	Tri-City Americans	WHL	29	1	8	9	9	—	—	—	—	—
1997–98	Powell River Kings	BCHL	42	25	25	50	83	—	—	—	—	—
1998–99	University of Calgary	CWUAA	43	37	22	59	40	—	—	—	—	—
1999–00	University of Calgary	CWUAA	23	16	19	35	12	—	—	—	—	—
1999–00	Knoxville Speed	UHL	36	19	32	51	15	—	—	—	—	—
1999–00	Kansas City Blades	IHL	11	0	2	2	4	—	—	—	—	—
2000–01	Johnstown Chiefs	ECHL	66	33	37	70	32	4	0	1	1	6
2000–01	Detroit Vipers	IHL	6	0	3	3	2	—	—	—	—	—
2001–02	Rochester Americans	AHL	3	0	0	0	0	—	—	—	—	—
2001–02	Cleveland Barons	AHL	1	0	0	0	0	—	—	—	—	—
2001–02	Saint John Flames	AHL	9	0	0	0	4	—	—	—	—	—
2001–02	Johnstown Chiefs	ECHL	65	38	40	78	40	8	4	4	8	2
2002–03	San Antonio Rampage	AHL	24	7	4	11	27	—	—	—	—	—
2002–03	Laredo Bucks	CHL	44	38	43	81	20	9	3	5	8	8
2003–04	Utah Grizzlies	AHL	8	1	3	4	9	—	—	—	—	—
2003–04	Las Vegas Wranglers	ECHL	44	21	20	41	30	5	0	0	0	2
2003–04	San Antonio Rampage	AHL	4	0	0	0	0	—	—	—	—	—
2004–05	ETC Crimmitschau	2.GBun	46	36	28	64	83	—	—	—	—	—
2005–06	SC Bietigheim-Bissingen	2.GBun	51	37	53	90	107	6	3	4	7	37
2006–07	Hannover Scorpions	DEL	52	17	25	42	74	6	1	2	3	14
2007–08	Hannover Scorpions	DEL	56	24	33	57	56	3	1	0	1	2
2008–09	Hannover Scorpions	DEL	50	22	32	54	67	11	3	9	12	12
2009–10	Frankfurt Lions	DEL	53	16	30	46	48	4	0	2	2	0
2010–11	EHC München	DEL	52	21	35	56	68	2	0	3	3	0
2011–12	EHC München	DEL	52	16	30	46	44	—	—	—	—	—
2012–13	Bentley Generals	ChHL	12	3	10	13	2	—	—	—	—	—
2012–13	Hamburg Freezers	DEL	13	3	6	9	18	4	5	1	6	29
2013–14	Bentley Generals	ChHL	2	3	2	5	0	—	—	—	—	—
2013–14	Adler Mannheim	DEL	8	2	2	4	0	5	0	0	0	2
2014–15	Bentley Generals	ChHL	7	2	2	4	0	9	1	6	7	2
AHL totals			49	8	7	15	40	—	—	—	—	—
DEL totals			336	121	193	314	375	35	10	17	27	59

== Awards and honours ==
Award	Year
Clare Drake Award – CIS Rookie of the Year	1998–99
Most Points in the 2nd Bundesliga	2005–06
