= Benedikt Kohl =

German ice hockey player

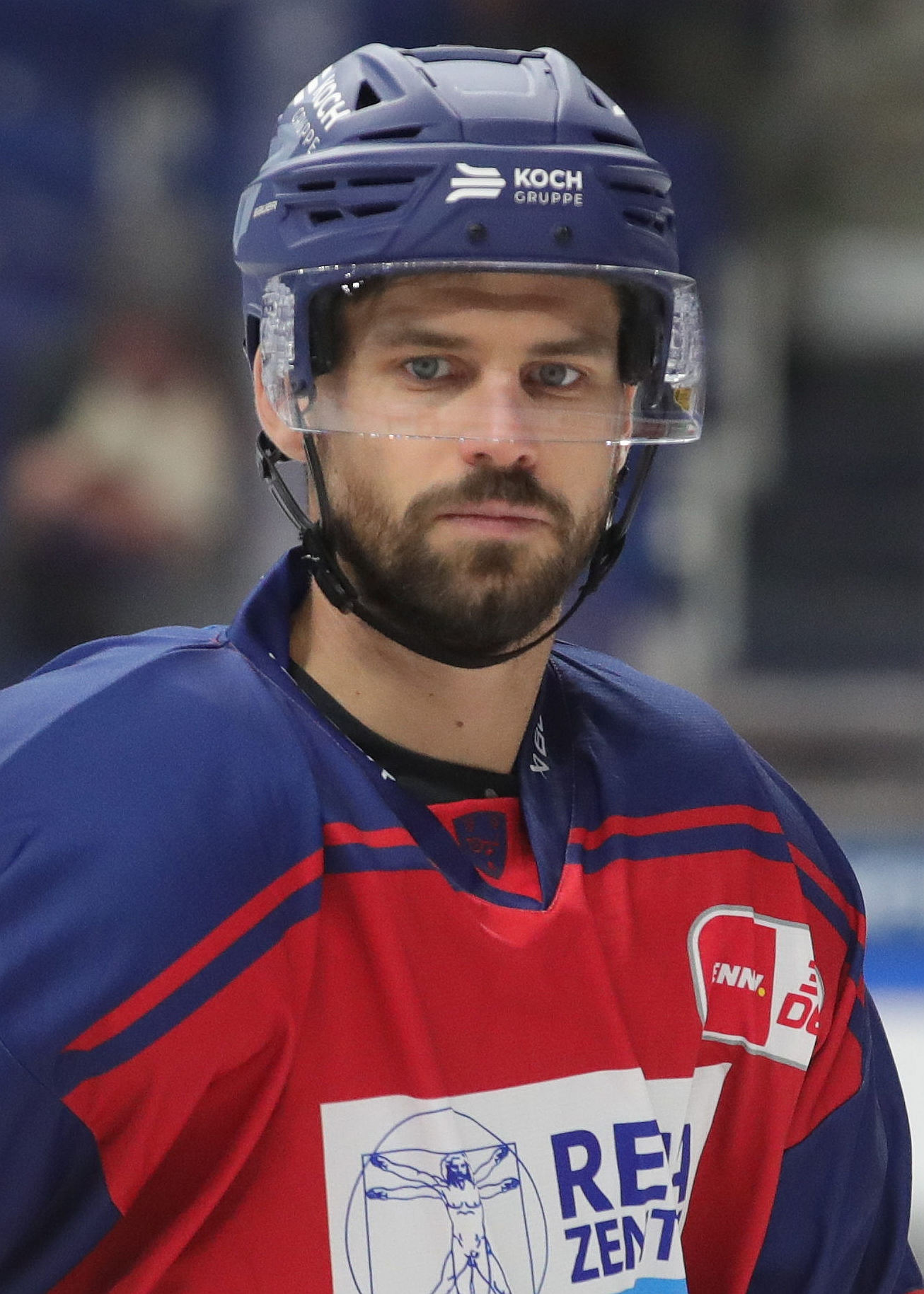
- Kohl with Straubing Tigers in 2023
- Born: March 31, 1988 (age 36); Berchtesgaden, Germany
- Height: 5 ft 11 in (180 cm)
- Weight: 185 lb (84 kg; 13 st 3 lb)
- Position: Defence
- Shoots: Right
- DEL team Former teams: Straubing Tigers; Adler Mannheim; Augsburger Panther; EHC Wolfsburg; ERC Ingolstadt
- National team: Germany
- NHL draft: Undrafted
- Playing career: 2005–present

Benedikt Kohl (born March 31, 1988) is a German professional ice hockey defenceman who plays for the Straubing Tigers of the Deutsche Eishockey Liga (DEL).

== Playing career ==
After three seasons with EHC Wolfsburg, Kohl transferred to his fourth DEL club, ERC Ingolstadt, on a one-year contract on May 8, 2014. During the 2014–15 season, Kohl was signed to a four-year contract extension to remain in Ingolstadt on January 20, 2015.

Kohl played in Ingolstadt for 5 seasons before leaving as a free agent following the 2018–19 season, agreeing to a one-year contract with the Straubing Tigers on April 3, 2019.

== Career statistics ==
=== Regular season and playoffs ===
			Regular season					Playoffs
Season	Team	League	GP	G	A	Pts	PIM	GP	G	A	Pts	PIM
2004–05	ERC Mannheimer	4.GBun	3	0	0	0	2	—	—	—	—	—
2005–06	Heilbronner Falken	3.GBun	3	0	0	0	0	—	—	—	—	—
2006–07	Heilbronner Falken	3.GBun	46	4	11	15	40	11	0	2	2	8
2007–08	Heilbronner Falken	2.GBun	50	3	11	14	36	9	0	2	2	4
2007–08	Adler Mannheim	DEL	1	0	0	0	2	—	—	—	—	—
2008–09	Heilbronner Falken	2.GBun	2	0	0	0	2	—	—	—	—	—
2008–09	Augsburger Panther	DEL	50	1	3	4	34	4	0	0	0	0
2009–10	Augsburger Panther	DEL	56	3	13	16	20	14	0	1	1	4
2010–11	Augsburger Panther	DEL	50	5	16	21	24	—	—	—	—	—
2011–12	Grizzly Adams Wolfsburg	DEL	50	5	14	19	39	4	0	0	0	2
2012–13	Grizzly Adams Wolfsburg	DEL	52	3	11	14	14	12	1	4	5	2
2013–14	Grizzly Adams Wolfsburg	DEL	50	4	19	23	30	11	0	5	5	8
2014–15	ERC Ingolstadt	DEL	50	4	16	20	53	18	1	3	4	2
2015–16	ERC Ingolstadt	DEL	52	4	15	19	35	2	0	0	0	0
2016–17	ERC Ingolstadt	DEL	49	1	10	11	47	1	0	0	0	0
2017–18	ERC Ingolstadt	DEL	31	0	2	2	0	—	—	—	—	—
2018–19	ERC Ingolstadt	DEL	42	4	3	7	12	7	1	1	2	2
2019–20	Straubing Tigers	DEL	48	2	19	21	22	—	—	—	—	—
2020–21	Straubing Tigers	DEL	37	0	5	5	14	3	0	0	0	0
2021–22	Straubing Tigers	DEL	43	1	8	9	12	4	0	0	0	2
2022–23	Straubing Tigers	DEL	38	1	10	11	14	—	—	—	—	—
2023–24	Straubing Tigers	DEL	27	0	3	3	8	1	0	1	1	0
DEL totals			726	38	167	205	380	81	3	15	18	22

=== International ===
Year	Team	Event	GP	G	A	Pts	PIM
2006	Germany	U18	6	0	0	0	2
2007	Germany	WJC	6	0	0	0	0
2008	Germany	WJC-D1	5	0	1	1	2
2013	Germany	OGQ	3	1	0	1	0
2013	Germany	WC	4	0	1	1	0
2014	Germany	WC	6	0	0	0	0
2015	Germany	WC	7	0	1	1	6
Junior totals			17	0	1	1	4
Senior totals			20	1	2	3	6
