= Thomas Dolak =

German ice hockey player

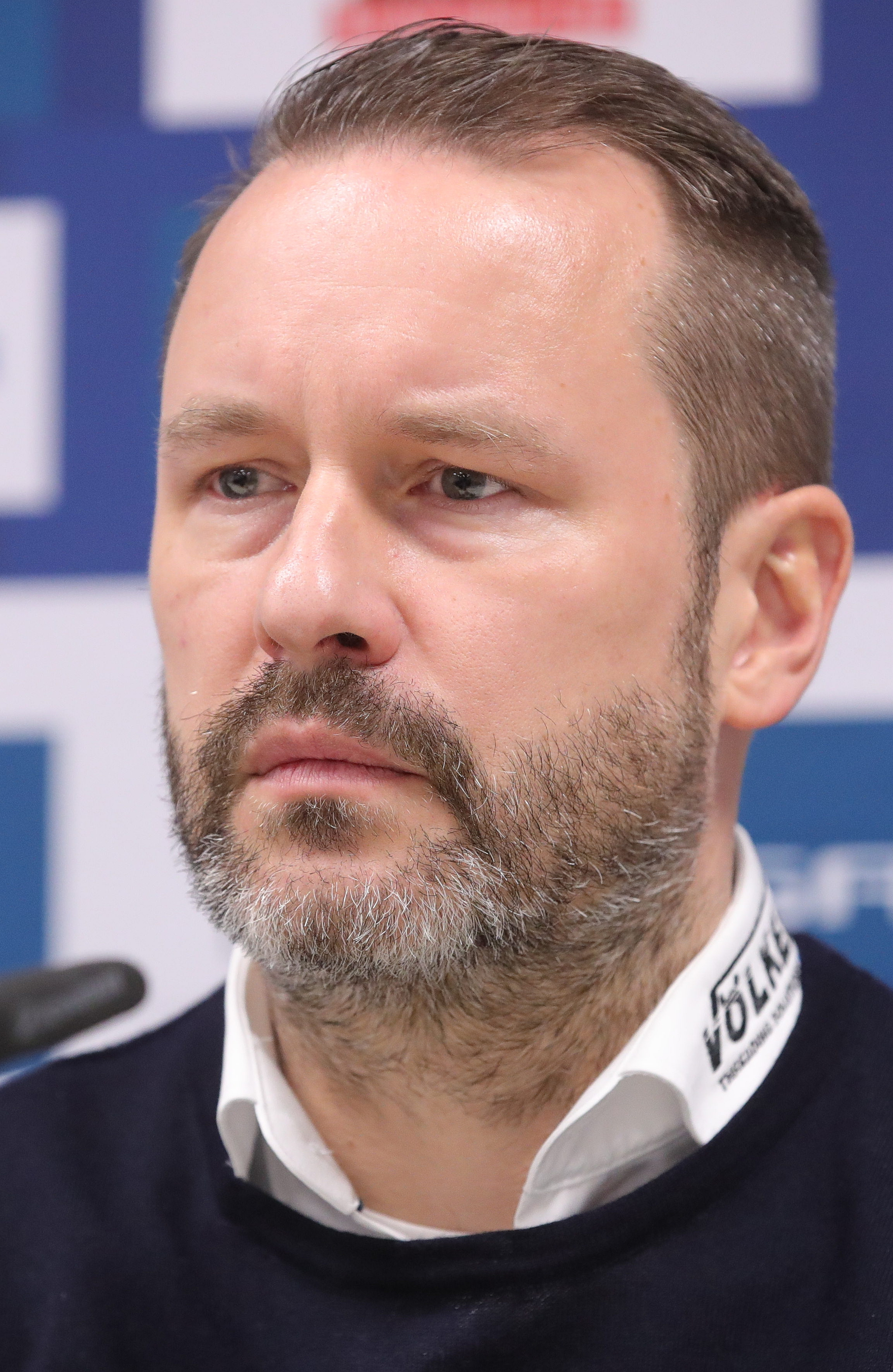
- Thomas Dolak, 2023
- Born: March 25, 1979 (age 45); Gottwaldov, Czechoslovakia
- Height: 5 ft 11 in (180 cm)
- Weight: 187 lb (85 kg; 13 st 5 lb)
- Position: Forward
- Shot: Left
- Played for: EHC Freiburg; Munich Barons; Hannover Scorpions; Dusseldorfer EG; Hamburg Freezers; Kassel Huskies
- National team: Germany
- NHL draft: Undrafted
- Playing career: 1994–2015

Thomas Dolak (born March 25, 1979) is a retired Czech-born German professional ice hockey player. He last played for Dusseldorfer EG in the Deutsche Eishockey Liga (DEL).

== Career statistics ==
			Regular season					Playoffs
Season	Team	League	GP	G	A	Pts	PIM	GP	G	A	Pts	PIM
1994–95	EHC Freiburg	Germany2	2	0	0	0	0	—	—	—	—	—
1994–95	EHC Freiburg U18	Jugend-BL	16	61	66	127	36	—	—	—	—	—
1995–96	EHC Freiburg	Germany2	41	21	25	46	10	—	—	—	—	—
1996–97	EHC Freiburg	Germany2	50	21	40	61	32	—	—	—	—	—
1997–98	Kingston Frontenacs	OHL	3	1	2	3	0	—	—	—	—	—
1997–98	North Bay Centennials	OHL	48	13	29	42	20	—	—	—	—	—
1998–99	Kassel Huskies	DEL	49	5	15	20	10	—	—	—	—	—
1999–00	Kassel Huskies	DEL	56	6	13	19	20	8	1	0	1	6
2000–01	Munich Barons	DEL	59	9	14	23	16	3	0	0	0	0
2001–02	Munich Barons	DEL	60	1	7	8	2	9	0	0	0	6
2002–03	Hamburg Freezers	DEL	51	0	5	5	35	5	0	1	1	0
2003–04	Hannover Scorpions	DEL	51	8	5	13	14	—	—	—	—	—
2004–05	Hannover Scorpions	DEL	52	2	10	12	14	—	—	—	—	—
2005–06	Hannover Scorpions	DEL	49	9	22	31	22	10	1	1	2	4
2006–07	Hannover Scorpions	DEL	52	13	32	45	22	6	1	4	5	0
2007–08	Hannover Scorpions	DEL	47	11	19	30	12	3	1	0	1	0
2008–09	Hannover Scorpions	DEL	50	16	29	45	12	10	1	3	4	0
2009–10	Hannover Scorpions	DEL	56	20	33	53	22	10	4	7	11	6
2010–11	Hannover Scorpions	DEL	51	18	28	46	10	5	2	2	4	4
2011–12	Hamburg Freezers	DEL	45	6	20	26	22	5	0	2	2	2
2012–13	Hamburg Freezers	DEL	47	6	19	25	14	6	5	1	6	4
2014–15	Dusseldorfer EG	DEL	3	0	1	1	0	7	2	2	4	0
DEL totals			778	130	272	402	247	92	18	28	46	34
