= Adrian Grygiel =

Polish-born German ice hockey player

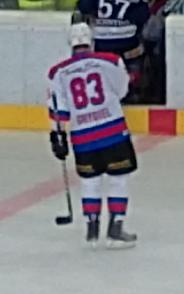
- Born: August 13, 1983 (age 41); Katowice, Poland
- Height: 5 ft 11 in (180 cm)
- Weight: 187 lb (85 kg; 13 st 5 lb)
- Position: Right wing
- Shoots: Right
- DEL2 team Former teams: Eispiraten Crimmitschau; Krefeld Pinguine; Thomas Sabo Ice Tigers; Grizzly Adams Wolfsburg; Augsburger Panther
- Playing career: 2000–present

Adrian Grygiel (born May 8, 1983) is a Polish-born German professional ice hockey player. He is currently playing for Eispiraten Crimmitschau in the DEL2. He has previously played with Krefeld Pinguine, Thomas Sabo Ice Tigers, Grizzly Adams Wolfsburg and Augsburger Panther in the DEL.
