= Alexander Weiss =

German ice hockey player (born 1987)

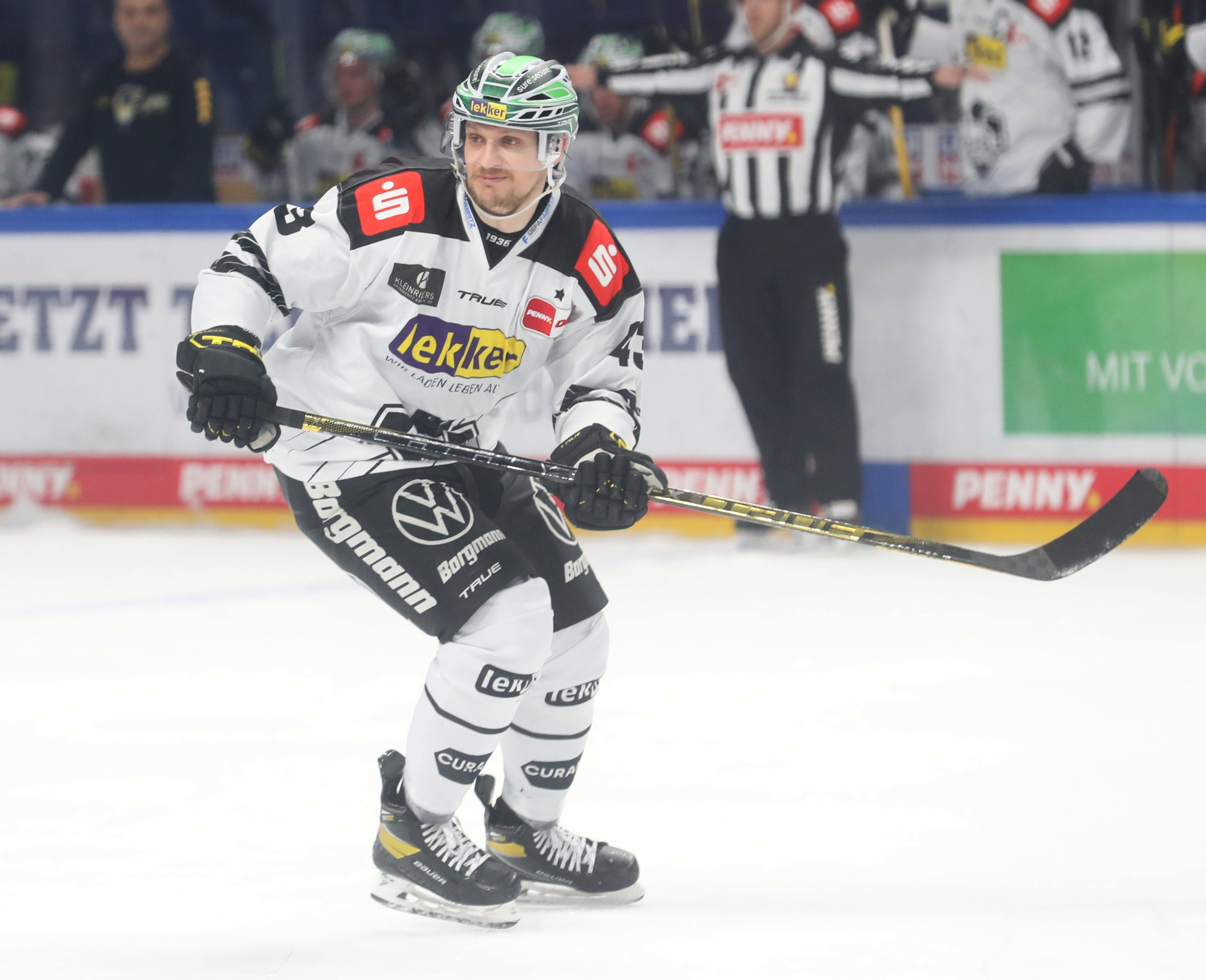
- Born: January 29, 1987 (age 38); Titisee-Neustadt, West Germany
- Height: 5 ft 11 in (180 cm)
- Weight: 170 lb (77 kg; 12 st 2 lb)
- Position: Forward
- Shoots: Left
- DEL team Former teams: Schwenninger Wild Wings; Eisbären Berlin; Kölner Haie; Grizzlys Wolfsburg
- National team: Germany
- Playing career: 2005–present

Alexander Weiss (born January 29, 1987) is a German professional ice hockey forward who currently plays for the Schwenninger Wild Wings of the Deutsche Eishockey Liga (DEL). Weiss originally played with Eisbären Berlin of the DEL.

== Playing career ==
After five seasons with Kölner Haie, Weiss out of contract opted to sign for his third DEL club, agreeing to a three-year deal with Grizzlys Wolfsburg on May 2, 2016.

Weiss enjoyed three seasons with the Wing Wings, leaving at the conclusion of the 2018–19 season, after he was limited to 8 points in 23 games through injury. On March 12, 2019, Weiss joined his fourth DEL club, agreeing to a one-year deal with the Schwenninger Wild Wings.

== Career statistics ==
=== International ===
Year	Team	Event	GP	G	A	Pts	PIM
2007	Germany	WJC	6	0	1	1	2
2014	Germany	WC	6	1	0	1	2
Junior totals			6	0	1	1	2
Senior totals			6	1	0	1	2
