= Steve Hanusch =

German ice hockey player

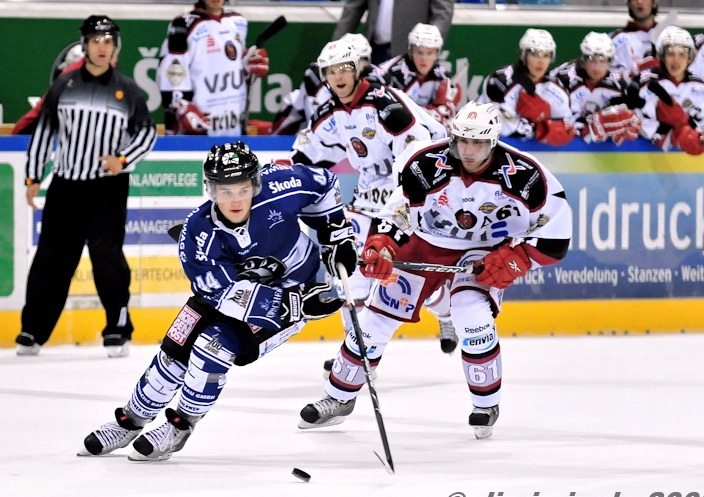
- Born: December 2, 1990 (age 34); Cottbus, Germany
- Height: 5 ft 10 in (178 cm)
- Weight: 191 lb (87 kg; 13 st 9 lb)
- Position: Defence
- Shoots: Left
- DEL2 team Former teams: Dresdner Eislöwen; Eisbären Berlin; Krefeld Pinguine
- Playing career: 2008–present

Steve Hanusch (born December 2, 1990) is a German professional ice hockey defenceman who currently plays for Dresdner Eislöwen of the DEL2. He previously played with Eisbären Berlin before joining Krefeld Pinguine on April 29, 2012. In the midst of the 2016–17 season, his 5th with the Pinguine, Hanusch left the club to sign in the DEL2 with the Kassel Huskies on December 13, 2016.
