= Boris Blank (ice hockey) =

German professional ice hockey player

- Born: July 10, 1978 (age 48) Karaganda, Soviet Union
- Height: 6 ft 0 in (183 cm)
- Weight: 205 lb (93 kg; 14 st 9 lb)
- Position: Left wing
- Shoots: Left
- DEL team Former teams: Free Agent; Essen Mosquitoes; Eisbären Berlin; Kölner Haie; Krefeld Pinguine; Iserlohn Roosters
- National team: Germany
- NHL draft: Undrafted
- Playing career: 2000–present

Boris Blank (born July 10, 1978) is a German professional ice hockey player. He is currently an unrestricted free agent who last played for Iserlohn Roosters in the Deutsche Eishockey Liga (DEL). He joined the Roosters as a free agent on June 25, 2014, after previously playing in nine seasons with the Krefeld Pinguine. In the 2016–17 season with the Roosters, Blank contributed with 8 goals and 16 points in 52 games as Iserlohn finished out of playoff contention. On March 3, 2017, it was announced that Blank's contract would not be renewed after three seasons with the Roosters.
