= Martin Schymainski =

German ice hockey player

- Born: February 24, 1986 (age 39); Duisburg, Germany
- Height: 5 ft 6 in (168 cm)
- Weight: 192 lb (87 kg; 13 st 10 lb)
- Position: Forward
- Shoots: Left
- Germany3 team Former teams: Krefelder EV 1981; Krefeld Pinguine; EV Duisburg; Iserlohn Roosters; Augsburger Panther; EHC München
- Playing career: 2003–present

Martin Schymainski (born. February 24, 1986) is a German professional ice hockey forward who currently plays for Krefelder EV 1981 U23 of the Oberliga (Germany3). On April 28, 2015, Schymainski signed a two-year contract extension to remain with Pinguine.
