= Markus Janka =

German ice hockey player

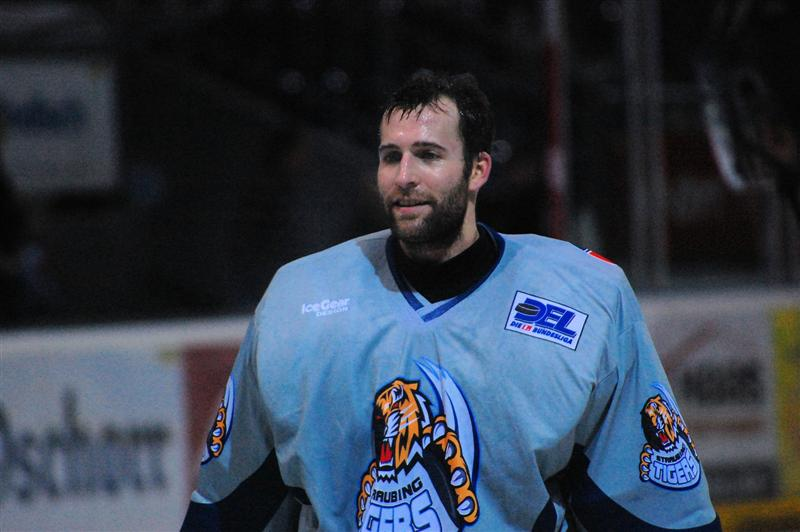
- Janka with Straubing Tigers, October 2008
- Born: 21 March 1980 (age 45); Wolfratshausen, FRG
- Height: 1.77 m (5 ft 10 in)
- Weight: 77 kg (170 lb; 12 st 2 lb)
- Position: Goaltender
- Catches: Left
- DEL team Former teams: Free Agent; Schwenninger Wild Wings; Kassel Huskies; Krefeld Pinguine; Straubing Tigers; ERC Ingolstadt
- Playing career: 2000–present

Markus Janka (born 21 March 1980 in Wolfratshausen) is a German professional ice hockey player who is currently an unrestricted free agent. He most recently played for Schwenninger Wild Wings in the Deutsche Eishockey Liga (German Ice Hockey League). Previously he has also played for the Kassel Huskies, Krefeld Pinguine, Straubing Tigers and ERC Ingolstadt.
