= Alexander Dotzler =

German ice hockey player

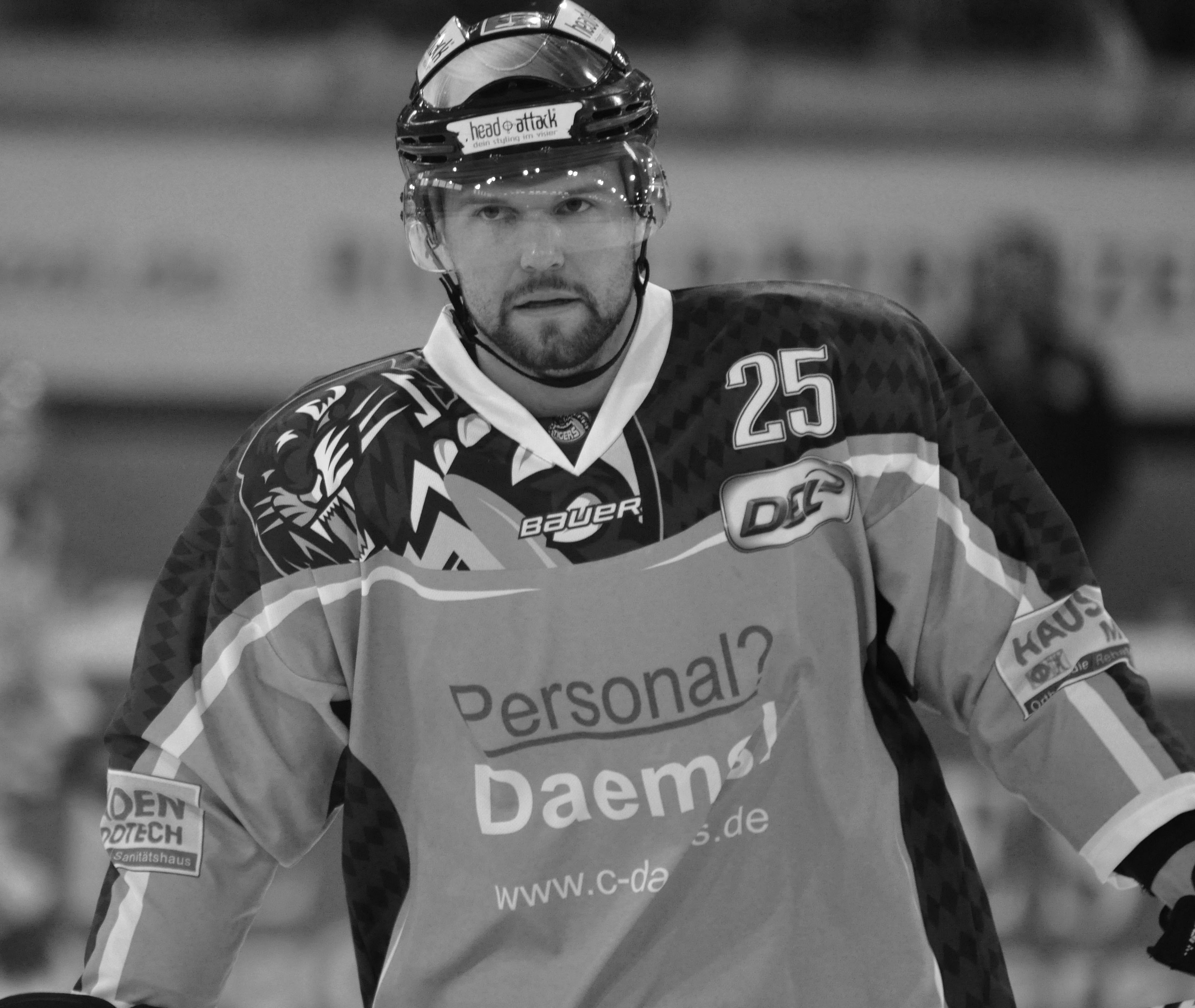
- Born: September 12, 1984 (age 40); Regensburg, Germany
- Height: 5 ft 11 in (180 cm)
- Weight: 196 lb (89 kg; 14 st 0 lb)
- Position: Defence
- Shoots: Left
- DEL2 team Former teams: Dresdner Eislöwen; Grizzlys Wolfsburg; Hamburg Freezers; Straubing Tigers; Iserlohn Roosters
- Playing career: 2001–present

Alexander Dotzler (born September 12, 1984) is a German professional ice hockey defenceman who is currently with the Dresdner Eislöwen of the DEL2. He has previously played in the Deutsche Eishockey Liga (DEL) for the Grizzlys Wolfsburg, Hamburg Freezers, Straubing Tigers and Iserlohn Roosters.

== Career statistics ==
=== Regular season and playoffs ===
			Regular season					Playoffs
Season	Team	League	GP	G	A	Pts	PIM	GP	G	A	Pts	PIM
2000–01	EV Regensburg	3.GBun	10	0	0	0	2	5	0	0	0	0
2001–02	EV Regensburg	2.GBun	40	0	0	0	0	—	—	—	—	—
2002–03	EV Regensburg	2.GBun	38	0	2	2	18	—	—	—	—	—
2003–04	EV Regensburg	2.GBun	45	0	4	4	30	—	—	—	—	—
2004–05	EV Regensburg	2.GBun	49	0	5	5	32	10	0	2	2	2
2005–06	EV Regensburg	2.GBun	49	0	4	4	36	6	0	1	1	4
2006–07	EV Regensburg	2.GBun	51	3	6	9	57	4	0	0	0	4
2007–08	Bietigheim Steelers	2.GBun	52	3	4	7	22	5	0	0	0	2
2008–09	Bietigheim Steelers	2.GBun	43	3	8	11	12	—	—	—	—	—
2008–09	Grizzly Adams Wolfsburg	DEL	1	0	0	0	0	—	—	—	—	—
2009–10	Hamburg Freezers	DEL	56	1	9	10	32	—	—	—	—	—
2010–11	Hamburg Freezers	DEL	51	3	2	5	6	—	—	—	—	—
2011–12	Straubing Tigers	DEL	52	2	4	6	16	3	0	0	0	0
2012–13	Straubing Tigers	DEL	46	1	4	5	18	7	2	0	2	4
2013–14	Straubing Tigers	DEL	47	4	12	16	22	—	—	—	—	—
2014–15	Straubing Tigers	DEL	52	0	1	1	26	—	—	—	—	—
2015–16	Straubing Tigers	DEL	52	0	8	8	34	5	0	0	0	0
2016–17	Grizzlys Wolfsburg	DEL	29	1	1	2	10	15	0	1	1	2
2017–18	Straubing Tigers	DEL	48	1	9	10	26	—	—	—	—	—
2018–19	Straubing Tigers	DEL	10	0	0	0	2	—	—	—	—	—
2018–19	Iserlohn Roosters	DEL	23	1	3	4	8	—	—	—	—	—
DEL totals			467	14	53	67	200	30	2	1	3	6

=== International ===
Year	Team	Event	GP	G	A	Pts	PIM
2002	Germany	WJC18	8	0	0	0	6
Junior totals			8	0	0	0	6
