= Jens Baxmann =

German ice hockey player (born 1985)

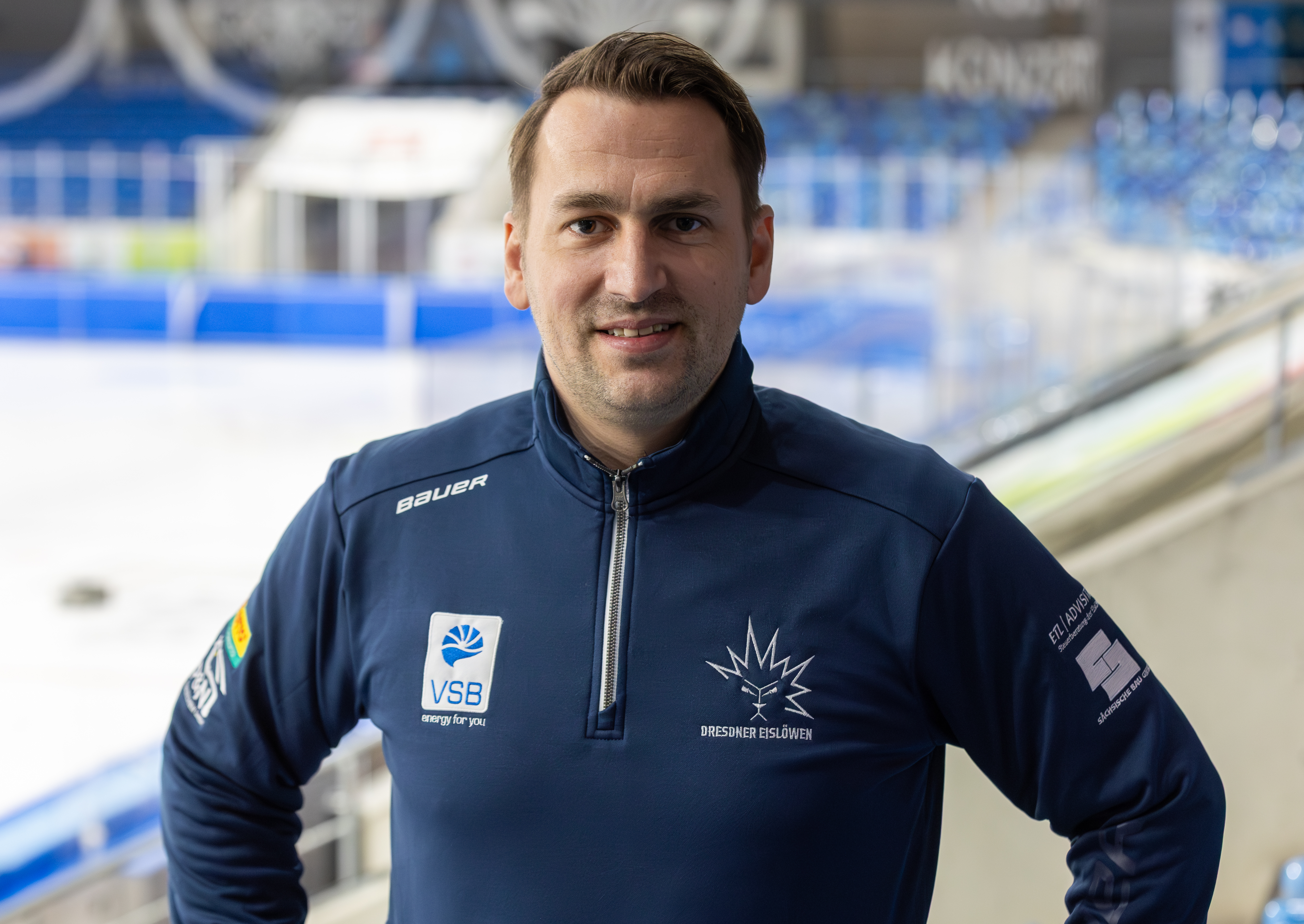
- Baxmann in 2026
- Born: 24 March 1985 (age 41) Wernigerode, East Germany
- Height: 1.81 m (5 ft 11 in)
- Weight: 86 kg (190 lb; 13 st 8 lb)
- Position: Defence
- Shot: Left
- Played for: Eisbären Berlin; Iserlohn Roosters
- National team: Germany
- Playing career: 2003–2022

Jens Baxmann (born 24 March 1985) is a German former professional ice hockey defenceman who played in the Deutsche Eishockey Liga (DEL). Baxmann spent the majority of his professional career, playing as a stalwart on the blueline with Eisbären Berlin before spending two seasons with the Iserlohn Roosters.

On April 2, 2019, having concluded his 16th season with Eisbären Berlin in 2018–19, Baxmann left the club as a free agent, opting to continue his career in agreeing to a two-year contract with fellow German club, the Iserlohn Roosters.

Baxmann has also played internationally for the German national team.
