= Vincent Schlenker =

German ice hockey player

- Born: December 17, 1992 (age 32); Villingen-Schwenningen, Germany
- Height: 1.90 m (6 ft 3 in)
- Weight: 88 kg (194 lb; 13 st 12 lb)
- Position: Forward
- Shoots: Right
- DEL team: Eisbären Berlin
- NHL draft: Undrafted
- Playing career: 2011–present

Vincent Schlenker (born December 17, 1992) is a German professional ice hockey player. He is currently playing for the Eisbären Berlin (Berlin Polar Bears) in the Deutsche Eishockey Liga (German Ice Hockey League).
