= Roland Verwey =

German ice hockey player (born 1981)

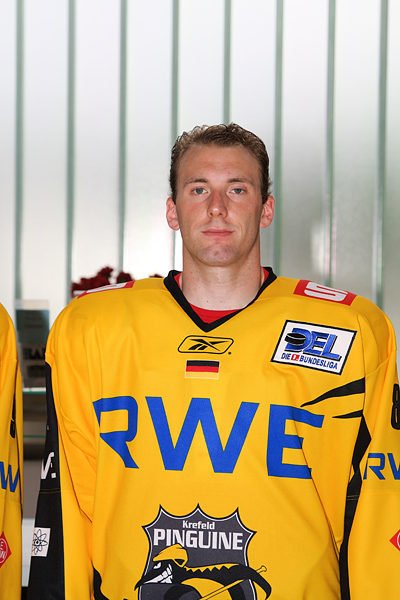
- Born: December 27, 1981 (age 43); Duisburg, West Germany
- Height: 6 ft 2 in (188 cm)
- Weight: 225 lb (102 kg; 16 st 1 lb)
- Position: Forward
- Shoots: Left
- DEL team: Krefeld Pinguine
- NHL draft: Undrafted
- Playing career: 1999–present

Roland Verwey (born December 27, 1981) is a German professional ice hockey player. He is currently playing for Krefeld Pinguine in the Deutsche Eishockey Liga (DEL).

== Career statistics ==
			Regular season					Playoffs
Season	Team	League	GP	G	A	Pts	PIM	GP	G	A	Pts	PIM
1994–95	Krefelder EV 1981 U16	Schüler-BL	11	6	3	9	0	—	—	—	—	—
1997–98	EV Duisburg	Germany2	—	—	—	—	—	2	0	0	0	0
1998–99	ESC Moskitos Essen	Germany2	1	0	0	0	0	—	—	—	—	—
1999–00	Moskitos Essen	DEL	26	0	0	0	0	—	—	—	—	—
1999–00	ESC Moskitos Essen U20	Junioren-BL	38	33	23	56	176	—	—	—	—	—
2001–02	Iserlohn Roosters	DEL	59	2	1	3	22	—	—	—	—	—
2002–03	Iserlohn Roosters	DEL	52	0	0	0	28	—	—	—	—	—
2003–04	Iserlohn Roosters	DEL	50	5	6	11	32	—	—	—	—	—
2003–04	EV Duisburg	Germany2	2	0	1	1	4	4	0	1	1	18
2004–05	Iserlohn Roosters	DEL	52	4	7	11	62	—	—	—	—	—
2004–05	Füchse Duisburg	Germany2	—	—	—	—	—	12	2	4	6	16
2005–06	Krefeld Pinguine	DEL	52	7	10	17	44	5	0	0	0	0
2006–07	Krefeld Pinguine	DEL	52	12	15	27	70	2	0	0	0	2
2007–08	Krefeld Pinguine	DEL	51	15	17	32	48	—	—	—	—	—
2008–09	Krefeld Pinguine	DEL	50	8	16	24	52	7	2	2	4	2
2009–10	Krefeld Pinguine	DEL	54	11	15	26	77	—	—	—	—	—
2010–11	Krefeld Pinguine	DEL	49	9	9	18	36	8	5	0	5	6
2011–12	Krefeld Pinguine	DEL	44	9	11	20	65	—	—	—	—	—
2012–13	Krefeld Pinguine	DEL	38	7	11	18	46	9	1	2	3	4
2013–14	Krefeld Pinguine	DEL	48	5	7	12	53	5	0	0	0	16
DEL totals			677	94	125	219	635	36	8	4	12	30
