= Patrick Seifert =

German ice hockey player

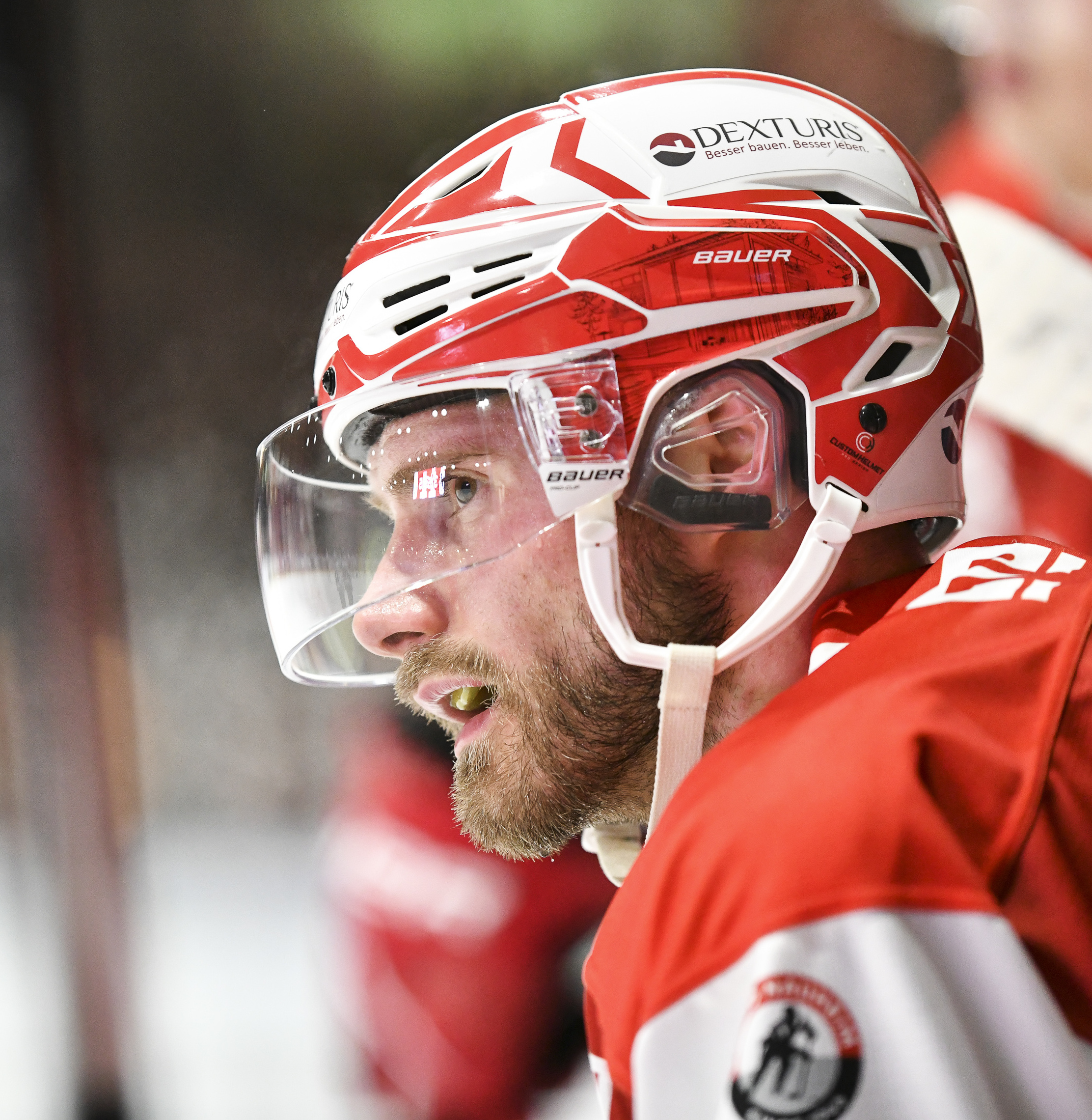
- Patrick Seifert
- Born: April 22, 1990 (age 35) Augsburg, West Germany
- Height: 6 ft 0 in (183 cm)
- Weight: 183 lb (83 kg; 13 st 1 lb)
- Position: Defence
- Shoots: Left
- DEL2 team Former teams: Ravensburg Towerstars; Augsburger Panther; Grizzlys Wolfsburg; Krefeld Pinguine
- Playing career: 2006–present

Patrick Seifert (born April 22, 1990) is a German professional ice hockey defenceman who is currently playing for the Ravensburg Towerstars of the DEL2. He most recently played for Krefeld Pinguine of the Deutsche Eishockey Liga (DEL).

== Playing career ==
After seven seasons within the Augsburger Panther organization, Seifert left as a free agent to sign a two-year contract with Grizzlys Wolfsburg of the DEL on April 14, 2015.

Seifert enjoyed a career best season in the final year of his contract with Wolfsburg in 2016–17, appearing in 44 games from the blueline in contributing with 3 goals and 12 points. As a free agent, Seifert opted to join his third DEL club in agreeing to a one-year contract with Krefeld Pinguine on May 5, 2017.

In the 2018–19 season, his second with the Krefeld, Trettenes contributed with 4 points in 24 games before leaving as a free agent at the conclusion of the year.
