= Jan Guryca =

French ice hockey player

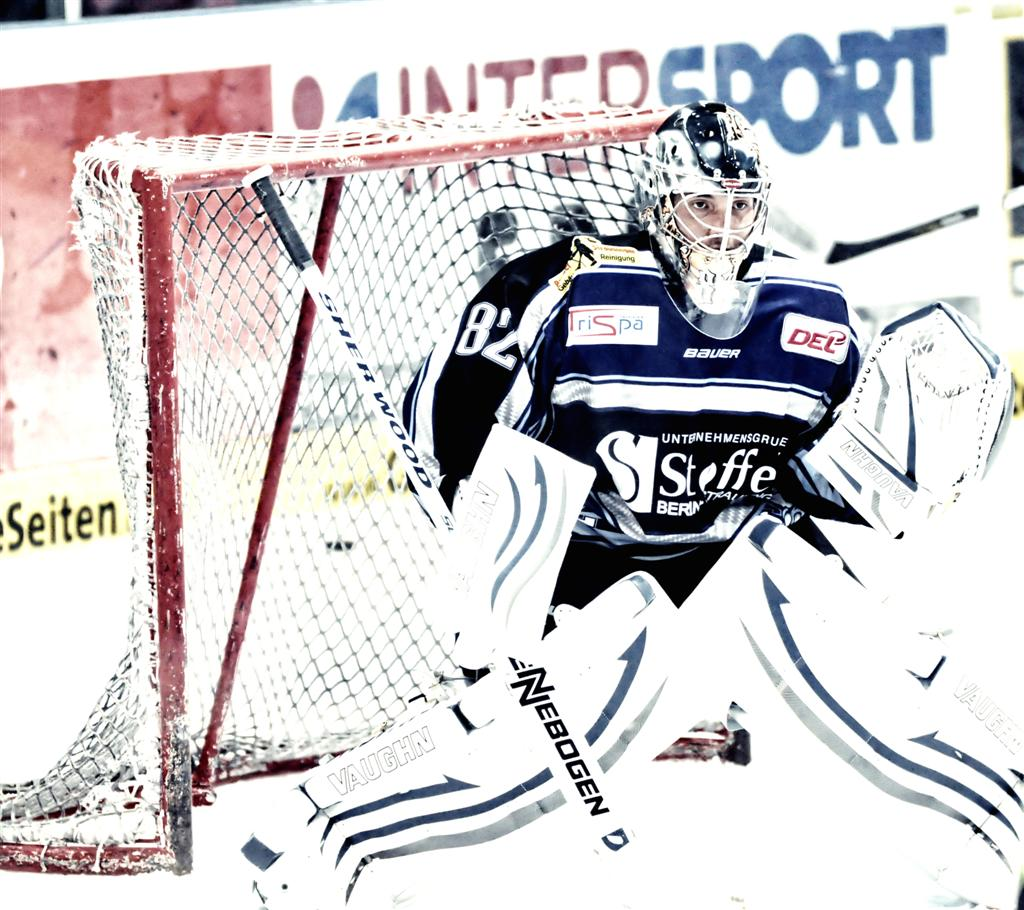
- Guryca filtered
- Born: October 28, 1982 (age 42); Chamonix, France
- Height: 5 ft 11 in (180 cm)
- Weight: 183 lb (83 kg; 13 st 1 lb)
- Position: Goaltender
- Catches: Left
- DEL team: Straubing Tigers
- NHL draft: Undrafted
- Playing career: 2001–present

Jan Guryca (born October 28, 1982) is a French professional ice hockey goaltender. He is currently playing for Straubing Tigers in the Deutsche Eishockey Liga (DEL).
