= Daniar Dshunussow =

German ice hockey player

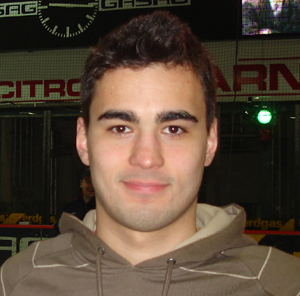
- Born: March 12, 1986 (age 39); Berlin, Germany
- Height: 6 ft 3 in (191 cm)
- Weight: 198 lb (90 kg; 14 st 2 lb)
- Position: Goaltender
- Catches: Left
- DEL team Former teams: Free Agent; Eisbären Berlin; Hamburg Freezers; EHC Wolfsburg; Iserlohn Roosters; Kölner Haie
- Playing career: 2005–present

Daniar Dshunussow қаз: Данияр Жүнісов (born March 12, 1986) is a Kazakh-German professional ice hockey goaltender who is currently an unrestricted free agent. He most recently played for Kölner Haie in the Deutsche Eishockey Liga (DEL). He joined the Sharks as a free agent, signing a one-year contract on April 10, 2015, after spending the 2014–15 season with the Iserlohn Roosters.

== Awards and honours ==
Award	Year
DEL
Best goals against average (2.39)	2009–10
Best save percentage (.934)	2009–10
