= Dustin Whitecotton =

Canadian ice hockey player and coach

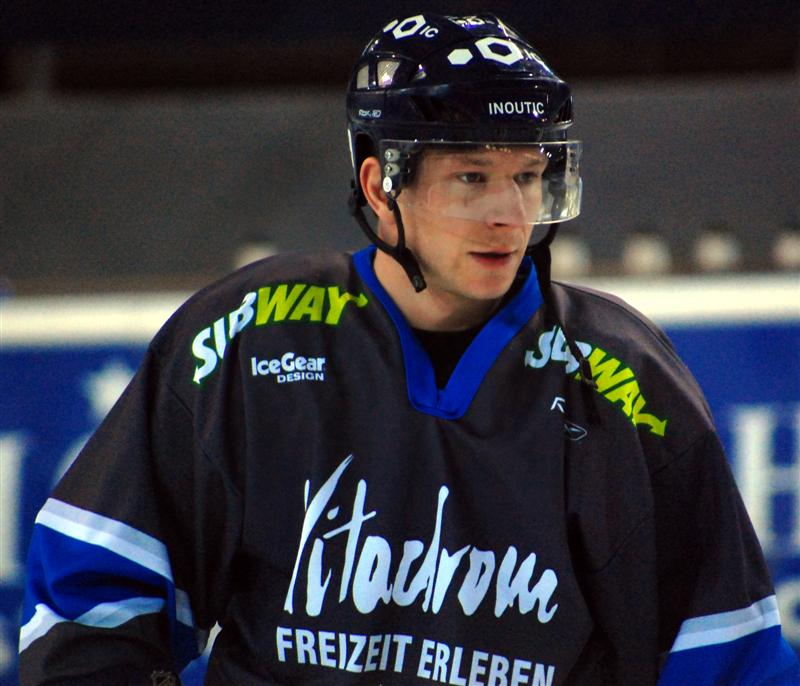
- Born: May 3, 1979 (age 46) Cherryville, British Columbia, Canada
- Height: 5 ft 10 in (178 cm)
- Weight: 179 lb (81 kg; 12 st 11 lb)
- Position: Centre
- Shot: Left
- Played for: Rochester Americans; Grand Rapids Griffins; Lowell Lock Monsters; Schwenninger Wild Wings; Straubing Tigers; Belfast Giants; Deggendorfer SC; Dragons de Rouen
- NHL draft: Undrafted
- Playing career: 2000–2016

Dustin Whitecotton (born May 3, 1979) is a Canadian ice hockey coach and a retired professional ice hockey player. He is currently head coach of Vipiteno Broncos, an Italian team of the Alps Hockey League.

== Collegiate career ==
After playing junior hockey for the Vernon Vipers of the British Columbia Hockey League, Whitecotton signed to play US college hockey for Miami University in Oxford, Ohio. Whitecotton became a fixture on Miami and helped his team in his freshman season advance to the 1997 NCAA Division I Men's Ice Hockey Tournament, playing with teammates and future NHL players Dan Boyle and center Randy Robitaille. Miami lost to Cornell 4–2 in the regional quarterfinals played at Van Andel Arena in Grand Rapids, Michigan. Whitecotton was honored as the team Most Valuable Player in his senior, 1999–00, season with 12 goals and 39 points, serving as a team captain, and honored by the Central Collegiate Hockey Association (CCHA) as First-Team Academic All-CCHA

== Professional career ==
He made his pro debut in the American Hockey League (AHL) for the Rochester Americans at the end of the 1999–2000 season. Until 2003, he played for different teams in the AHL, UHL and ECHL, before taking his game abroad. He landed his first overseas job in Germany, spending the 2003–04 season with second-division side Weiden. From 2004 to 2008, representing the Schwenninger Wild Wings, he established himself as one of the best forwards of Germany's second-tier league and was picked up by the Straubing Tigers of the top-flight Deutsche Eishockey Liga (DEL) in 2008. During his five-year stint with the Tigers, Whitecotton made a total of 235 DEL appearances with 41 goals and 77 assists.

He signed for the Belfast Giants of the British Elite Ice Hockey League (EIHL) for the 2013–2014 season and helped the Giants capture the EIHL title. After spending the 2014–15 season with German Oberliga side Deggendorfer SC and the 2015-16 campaign with the Dragons de Rouen of France, Whitecotton called it a career.

== Coaching career ==
Whitecotton started his career behind the bench in July 2016, when he was appointed head coach of German Oberliga team EV Lindau. He is currently the head coach of the Wipptal Broncos in northern Italy.
