= 2017–18 DEL season =

- League: Deutsche Eishockey Liga
- Sport: Ice hockey
- Duration: 8 September 2017–April 2018
- Games: 364
- Teams: 14

Regular season
- Season champions: EHC Red Bull München
- Top scorer: Keith Aucoin (63 points)

Finals
- Champions: EHC Red Bull München
- Runners-up: Eisbären Berlin

DEL seasons
- ← 2016–17 2018–19 →

The 2017–18 Deutsche Eishockey Liga season was the 24th season since the founding of the Deutsche Eishockey Liga.

EHC Red Bull München defended their title to win the third consecutive title.

== Teams ==
Teams of the 2017–18 DEL season

Team	City	Arena
Augsburger Panther	Augsburg	Curt Frenzel Stadium
Eisbären Berlin	Berlin	Mercedes-Benz Arena
Fischtown Pinguins	Bremerhaven	Eisarena Bremerhaven
Düsseldorfer EG	Düsseldorf	ISS Dome
ERC Ingolstadt	Ingolstadt	Saturn Arena
Iserlohn Roosters	Iserlohn	Eissporthalle Iserlohn
Kölner Haie	Cologne	Lanxess Arena
Krefeld Pinguine	Krefeld	König Palast
Adler Mannheim	Mannheim	SAP Arena
EHC Red Bull München	Munich	Olympia Eishalle
Thomas Sabo Ice Tigers	Nuremberg	Arena Nürnberger Versicherung
Schwenninger Wild Wings	Villingen-Schwenningen	Helios Arena
Straubing Tigers	Straubing	Eisstadion am Pulverturm
Grizzlys Wolfsburg	Wolfsburg	Eis Arena Wolfsburg

== Regular season ==
=== Standings ===
Pos	Team	Pld	W	OTW	OTL	L	GF	GA	GD	Pts	Qualification
1	EHC Red Bull München	52	30	6	5	11	183	128	+55	107	Playoffs
2	Eisbären Berlin	52	29	4	6	13	169	131	+38	101	Playoffs
3	Thomas Sabo Ice Tigers	52	25	10	5	12	152	126	+26	100	Playoffs
4	ERC Ingolstadt	52	20	6	7	19	147	137	+10	79	Playoffs
5	Adler Mannheim	52	21	6	3	22	151	149	+2	78	Playoffs
6	Kölner Haie	52	21	5	4	22	148	142	+6	77	Playoffs
7	Grizzlys Wolfsburg	52	19	6	7	20	153	146	+7	76	Pre-playoffs
8	Iserlohn Roosters	52	21	6	1	24	138	154	−16	76	Pre-playoffs
9	Fischtown Pinguins	52	21	4	4	23	146	163	−17	75	Pre-playoffs
10	Schwenninger Wild Wings	52	19	7	3	23	123	130	−7	74	Pre-playoffs
11	Düsseldorfer EG	52	17	4	9	22	133	154	−21	68	
12	Augsburger Panther	52	17	4	6	25	151	158	−7	65	
13	Straubing Tigers	52	17	2	6	27	137	177	−40	61	
14	Krefeld Pinguine	52	11	6	10	25	141	177	−36	55	

Source: DEL
Rules for classification: 1) Points; 2) Goal difference; 3) Goals scored; 4) Head-to-head points; 5) Head-to-head goal difference; 6) Head-to-head number of goals scored.

=== Results ===
==== Matches 1–26 ====
Home \ Away	AUG	BER	BRE	DÜS	ING	ISE	KÖL	KRE	MAN	MUN	NÜR	SCH	STR	WOL
Augsburger Panther	—	7–4	3–1	2–0	1–2 (SO)	2–4	7–4	1–4	2–3	0–3	4–0	3–5	5–4	3–2 (OT)
Eisbären Berlin	2–1 (OT)	—	4–1	3–4 (SO)	6–1	2–3	3–2	4–3	3–4	5–4 (SO)	2–4	3–1	3–1	2–1
Fischtown Pinguins	3–4	2–7	—	2–5	1–5	1–2	3–2	6–3	2–1 (OT)	3–2	4–5 (SO)	1–0	3–1	3–2 (OT)
Düsseldorfer EG	2–4	2–4	3–2	—	0–2	6–1	2–3 (OT)	1–4	4–3 (SO)	6–4	2–0	1–3	3–2	1–2 (SO)
ERC Ingolstadt	4–2	2–3	0–4	1–3	—	5–0	1–6	2–5	0–1	2–5	3–2	5–3	2–4	3–0
Iserlohn Roosters	3–1	3–6	2–1 (SO)	1–5	4–1	—	5–4 (SO)	5–1	1–0	3–6	4–0	1–2 (OT)	4–3 (OT)	2–4
Kölner Haie	6–3	2–4	5–4 (OT)	3–2 (OT)	2–6	4–1	—	3–2	0–1	2–6	2–3	4–5 (SO)	5–1	5–1
Krefeld Pinguine	5–7	3–2 (SO)	2–4	4–2	5–3	3–5	5–3	—	6–2	2–3 (OT)	1–2 (SO)	4–5	4–0	1–3
Adler Mannheim	3–2 (SO)	1–4	2–4	5–4	3–1	2–5	2–6	4–1	—	1–4	2–1 (OT)	4–3 (SO)	5–2	6–3
EHC Red Bull München	5–2	4–2	5–3	5–1	0–4	1–2	3–2	3–2 (OT)	4–2	—	3–2 (OT)	3–1	6–3	2–5
Thomas Sabo Ice Tigers	2–1	2–1 (SO)	5–4	5–3	4–2	4–1	5–2	3–2	1–2 (SO)	2–1 (OT)	—	3–0	2–1 (SO)	0–1
Schwenninger Wild Wings	3–1	0–1	1–4	5–1	0–1 (OT)	2–1	1–2	5–1	2–4	4–2	2–4	—	5–3	0–2
Straubing Tigers	3–2	4–3 (SO)	1–2 (OT)	3–6	2–1 (SO)	1–5	6–3	0–1 (OT)	3–2	2–5	4–5	3–4 (SO)	—	1–6
Grizzlys Wolfsburg	5–3	2–5	5–2	3–2 (OT)	1–2	5–3	2–4	3–2 (SO)	6–2	4–3 (OT)	1–4	4–1	3–4	—

Source: DEL
Legend: Blue = home team win; Yellow = draw; Red = away team win.

==== Matches 27–52 ====
Home \ Away	AUG	BER	BRE	DÜS	ING	ISE	KÖL	KRE	MAN	MUN	NÜR	SCH	STR	WOL
Augsburger Panther	—	2–4	5–6	2–1 (OT)	1–5	4–2	1–3	7–1	3–4 (OT)	4–1	2–3	5–1	2–3	5–3
Eisbären Berlin	2–3	—	6–1	2–3	2–1 (OT)	3–1	3–5	3–1	6–3	3–2	2–3 (OT)	5–0	2–1	3–2
Fischtown Pinguins	2–1	1–4	—	5–0	1–5	4–3	3–4 (OT)	6–2	1–5	1–5	6–3	5–1	3–0	3–1
Düsseldorfer EG	2–3 (OT)	2–6	4–0	—	3–5	3–2	3–2 (OT)	7–3	1–2	1–3	3–4 (OT)	2–3 (OT)	4–3	4–7
ERC Ingolstadt	5–4 (SO)	5–0	3–2 (OT)	4–0	—	3–2	0–1	5–1	4–3	5–4 (OT)	6–2	2–1 (SO)	3–6	2–1 (OT)
Iserlohn Roosters	3–2	1–3	3–1	2–5	4–3 (OT)	—	3–1	2–5	5–3	1–5	5–2	2–5	2–1	1–4
Kölner Haie	6–3	1–3	5–2	0–1	3–2 (OT)	4–2	—	2–3 (SO)	5–0	0–6	2–3	2–1	4–2	3–4
Krefeld Pinguine	3–4 (OT)	3–4 (OT)	1–4	2–3 (OT)	7–3	4–5 (OT)	0–2	—	4–3 (OT)	1–3	2–4	4–0	3–4	4–3 (OT)
Adler Mannheim	5–1	6–2	5–1	3–1	3–1	2–3	2–0	7–0	—	1–3	3–2 (SO)	2–4	7–3	4–3
EHC Red Bull München	4–3	4–1	5–2	5–4 (OT)	4–3 (SO)	3–4 (OT)	5–0	3–2 (OT)	4–1	—	4–3	2–5	4–2	0–4
Thomas Sabo Ice Tigers	1–2	2–1 (OT)	7–4	2–1	2–1 (OT)	3–2	1–3	5–3	5–2	5–1	—	4–5 (OT)	7–4	2–1 (OT)
Schwenninger Wild Wings	3–1	1–2	5–2	4–2	2–1	3–4	1–0	2–1 (OT)	1–4	1–2	1–4	—	1–2	3–0
Straubing Tigers	4–2	6–5	0–4	2–1	5–2	5–1	1–4	3–2	4–2	2–5	2–3	2–3	—	4–5 (SO)
Grizzlys Wolfsburg	3–2 (OT)	7–4	4–5	3–0	5–8	1–2	3–0	2–3 (SO)	3–7	2–4	3–0	2–3 (OT)	1–4	—

Source: DEL
Legend: Blue = home team win; Yellow = draw; Red = away team win.

== Playoffs ==
=== Bracket ===
First round
7	Grizzlys Wolfsburg	2
10	Schwenninger Wild Wings	0
8	Iserlohn Roosters	0
9	Fischtown Pinguins	2

Quarterfinals
1	EHC München	4
9	Fischtown Pinguins	1
2	Eisbären Berlin	4
7	Grizzlys Wolfsburg	1
3	Thomas Sabo Ice Tigers	4
6	Kölner Haie	2
4	ERC Ingolstadt	1
5	Adler Mannheim	4

Semifinals
1	EHC München	4
5	Adler Mannheim	1
(Pairings are re-seeded after the first and second round)
2	Eisbären Berlin	4
3	Thomas Sabo Ice Tigers	2

Finals
1	EHC München	4
2	Eisbären Berlin	3

=== Playoff qualification ===
The playoff qualification were played between 7 and 9 March 2018 in a best-of-three mode.

==== Grizzlys Wolfsburg vs. Schwenninger Wild Wings ====
7 March	Grizzlys Wolfsburg	4–3	OT	Schwenninger Wild Wings	Eis Arena Wolfsburg, Wolfsburg	Recap
Sebastian Furchner – 03:05		First period		15:49 – Simon Danner
Christoph Hoehenleitner – 34:27		Second period		20:15 – Will Acton
Brent Aubin – 43:45		Third period		56:06 – Marc El-Sayed
Stephen Dixon – 71:05		First overtime period		No scoring
Gerald Kuhn (20 saves / 23 shots)		Goalie stats		Dustin Strahlmeier (29 saves / 33 shots)

9 March	Schwenninger Wild Wings	2–3	Grizzlys Wolfsburg	Helios Arena, Schwenningen	Recap
No scoring		First period	03:57 – Sebastian Furchner (PP); 12:01 – Stephen Dixon
Damien Fleury – 22:48; Will Acton – 38:42		Second period	20:42 – Brent Aubin
No scoring		Third period	No scoring
Dustin Strahlmeier (27 saves / 30 shots)		Goalie stats	Gerald Kuhn (19 saves / 21 shots)

Wolfsburg won series 2–0

==== Iserlohn Roosters vs. Fischtown Pinguins ====
7 March	Iserlohn Roosters	2–5	Fischtown Pinguins	Eissporthalle Iserlohn, Iserlohn	Recap
No scoring		First period	No scoring
Blaine Down – 39:16		Second period	37:02 – Ross Mauermann
Jack Combs – 58:12		Third period	42:43 – Mauermann; 44:39 – Cody Lampl; 47:38 – Jan Urbas; 59:15 – Kristopher Newbury (ENG)
Sebastian Dahm (33 saves / 38 shots)		Goalie stats	Tomáš Pöpperle (40 saves / 42 shots)

9 March	Fischtown Pinguins	4–3	OT	Iserlohn Roosters	Eisarena Bremerhaven, Bremerhaven	Recap
No scoring		First period		05:18 – Anthony Camara (PP)
Kristopher Newbury – 23:22		Second period		No scoring
Jordan Owens – 47:58; Rylan Schwartz – 54:39		Third period		46:15 – Camara (PP); 55:41 – Travis Turnbull
Jan Urbas – 74:23		First overtime period		No scoring
Tomáš Pöpperle (24 saves / 27 shots)		Goalie stats		Sebastian Dahm (36 saves / 40 shots)

Bremerhaven won series 2–0

=== Quarterfinals ===
The quarterfinals will be played between 14 and 27 March 2018 in a best-of-seven mode.

==== EHC München vs. Fischtown Pinguins ====
14 March	EHC München	3–4	OT	Fischtown Pinguins	Olympia Eishalle, Munich	Recap
Frank Mauer – 04:04; Michael Wolf – 10:42		First period		No scoring
No scoring		Second period		24:09 – Jason Bast
Mauer (PP, EA) – 58:43		Third period		50:41 – Chris Rumble (PP); 54:14 – Jan Urbas
No scoring		First overtime period		63:18 – Nicholas Jensen
Danny aus den Birken (17 saves / 21 shots)		Goalie stats		Tomáš Pöpperle (45 saves / 48 shots)

16 March	Fischtown Pinguins	3–6	EHC München	Eisarena Bremerhaven, Bremerhaven	Recap
No scoring		First period	00:52 – Brooks Macek; 12:49 – Maximilian Kastner; 17:27 – Keith Aucoin (PP)
Michael Moore – 22:11; Wade Bergman – 31:21		Second period	28:45 – Patrick Hager (PP)
Kris Newbury (PP) – 40:26		Third period	55:50 – Dominik Kahun; 58:29 – Jason Jaffray (ENG)
Tomáš Pöpperle (17 saves / 23 shots)		Goalie stats	Danny aus den Birken (28 saves / 31 shots)

18 March	EHC München	5–2	Fischtown Pinguins	Olympia Eishalle, Munich	Recap
No scoring		First period	13:44 – Chris Rumble (PP)
Frank Mauer – 32:38		Second period	30:37 – Mike Hoeffel (PP2)
Patrick Hager (PP) – 41:06; Mauer – 47:14; Hager – 52:19; Jon Matsumoto (PP) – 56:14		Third period	No scoring
Danny aus den Birken (23 saves / 25 shots)		Goalie stats	Tomáš Pöpperle (26 saves / 31 shots)

21 March	Fischtown Pinguins	2–5	EHC München	Eisarena Bremerhaven, Bremerhaven	Recap
Christoph Körner – 01:57		First period	No scoring
Jan Urbas (PP) – 31:17		Second period	22:07 – Brooks Macek; 25:51 – Macek
No scoring		Third period	41:12 – Mads Christensen; 43:38 – Michael Wolf; 57:17 – Frank Mauer (ENG)
Tomáš Pöpperle (19 saves / 24 shots)		Goalie stats	Danny aus den Birken (16 saves / 18 shots)

23 March	EHC München	4–1	Fischtown Pinguins	Olympia Eishalle, Munich	Recap
Michael Wolf (PP) – 13:42		First period	No scoring
Jason Jaffray – 37:44		Second period	No scoring
Markus Lauridsen – 43:18; Frank Mauer – 47:47		Third period	52:19 – Rylan Schwartz
Danny aus den Birken (31 saves / 32 shots)		Goalie stats	Tomáš Pöpperle (34 saves / 38 shots)

Munich won series 4–1

==== Eisbären Berlin vs. Grizzlys Wolfsburg ====
14 March	Eisbären Berlin	4–1	Grizzlys Wolfsburg	Mercedes-Benz Arena, Berlin	Recap
No scoring		First period	No scoring
Louis-Marc Aubry – 26:23; Mark Olver – 28:08		Second period	32:37 – Stephen Dixon (PP)
Aubry – 46:32; Danny Richmond – 56:11		Third period	No scoring
Petri Vehanen (21 saves / 22 shots)		Goalie stats	Gerald Kuhn (36 saves / 40 shots)

16 March	Grizzlys Wolfsburg	5–2	Eisbären Berlin	Eis Arena Wolfsburg, Wolfsburg	Recap
Christoph Hoehenleitner (PP) – 06:27; Fabio Pfohl (PP) – 11:55; Conor Allen – 12:53		First period	14:05 – Louis-Marc Aubry
No scoring		Second period	38:10 – Sean Backman
Alexander Weiss (PP) – 42:41; Brent Aubin (PP) – 55:28		Third period	No scoring
Gerald Kuhn (26 saves / 28 shots)		Goalie stats	Petri Vehanen (21 saves / 26 shots)

18 March	Eisbären Berlin	8–1	Grizzlys Wolfsburg	Mercedes-Benz Arena, Berlin	Recap
Jens Baxmann – 06:16; James Sheppard – 10:44; Danny Richmond – 13:03		First period	No scoring
Marcel Noebels – 29:05; André Rankel – 33:59		Second period	No scoring
Rihards Bukarts – 44:04; Sheppard (PP2) – 48:54; Nick Petersen – 56:38		Third period	43:39 – Conor Allen
Petri Vehanen (34 saves / 35 shots)		Goalie stats	Gerald Kuhn (35 saves / 43 shots)

21 March	Grizzlys Wolfsburg	1–3	Eisbären Berlin	Eis Arena Wolfsburg, Wolfsburg	Recap
Christoph Hoehenleitner (PP) – 15:38		First period	03:03 – Rihards Bukarts
No scoring		Second period	26:22 – André Rankel
No scoring		Third period	59:07 – Louis-Marc Aubry (ENG)
Gerald Kuhn (28 saves / 31 shots)		Goalie stats	Petri Vehanen (26 saves / 27 shots)

23 March	Eisbären Berlin	7–6	OT	Grizzlys Wolfsburg	Mercedes-Benz Arena, Berlin	Recap
Martin Buchwieser – 18:08		First period		10:28 – Tyson Mulock (PP); 19:47 – Robbie Bina
Nick Petersen (PP) – 27:07; Buchwieser – 29:28; Marcel Noebels – 35:00		Second period		23:15 – Mulock
Louis-Marc Aubry – 49:52; Noebels – 58:19		Third period		56:45 – Kris Foucault; 57:03 – Philip Riefers; 58:33 – Foucault (EA)
Rihards Bukarts – 62:13		First overtime period		No scoring
Petri Vehanen (24 saves / 30 shots)		Goalie stats		Gerald Kuhn (42 saves / 49 shots)

Berlin won series 4–1

==== Thomas Sabo Ice Tigers vs. Kölner Haie ====
14 March	Thomas Sabo Ice Tigers	1–4	Kölner Haie	Arena Nürnberger Versicherung, Nuremberg	Recap
Nichlas Torp – 09:15		First period	02:38 – Felix Schütz; 19:46 – Bill Thomas
No scoring		Second period	29:31 – Sebastian Uvira
No scoring		Third period	59:41 – Schütz (ENG)
Niklas Treutle (19 saves / 23 shots)		Goalie stats	Gustaf Wesslau (36 saves / 37 shots)

15 March	Kölner Haie	2–3	OT	Thomas Sabo Ice Tigers	Lanxess Arena, Cologne	Recap
Sebastian Uvira (PP) – 07:30; Blair Jones – 11:43		First period		15:12 – John Mitchell
No scoring		Second period		27:57 – Leonhard Pföderl
No scoring		Third period		No scoring
No scoring		First overtime period		77:46 – Pföderl
Gustaf Wesslau (34 saves / 37 shots)		Goalie stats		Niklas Treutle (26 saves / 28 shots)

18 March	Thomas Sabo Ice Tigers	2–4	Kölner Haie	Arena Nürnberger Versicherung, Nuremberg	Recap
Philippe Dupuis – 00:22		First period	18:46 – Blair Jones
Steven Reinprecht (PP) – 25:39		Second period	28:38 – Sebastian Uvira (PP)
No scoring		Third period	44:35 – Jones; 59:51 – Philip Gogulla (PP, ENG)
Niklas Treutle (41 saves / 45 shots)		Goalie stats	Gustaf Wesslau (27 saves / 29 shots)

20 March	Kölner Haie	2–3	Thomas Sabo Ice Tigers	Lanxess Arena, Cologne	Recap
Philip Gogulla (PP) – 11:38		First period	01:48 – Dane Fox; 16:36 – Brandon Segal
Ryan Jones – 39:51		Second period	No scoring
No scoring		Third period	52:00 – Leonhard Pföderl
Gustaf Wesslau (24 saves / 27 shots)		Goalie stats	Niklas Treutle (24 saves / 26 shots)

23 March	Thomas Sabo Ice Tigers	3–2	Kölner Haie	Arena Nürnberger Versicherung, Nuremberg	Recap
Dane Fox – 07:24; Dave Steckel – 09:55		First period	No scoring
Yasin Ehliz (PP) – 33:57		Second period	28:20 – T. J. Mulock; 35:05 – Ben Hanowski (PP)
No scoring		Third period	No scoring
Niklas Treutle (25 saves / 27 shots)		Goalie stats	Gustaf Wesslau (27 saves / 30 shots)

25 March	Kölner Haie	1–5	Thomas Sabo Ice Tigers	Lanxess Arena, Cologne	Recap
No scoring		First period	11:25 – Patrick Köppchen
Sebastian Uvira – 26:56		Second period	24:28 – Yasin Ehliz; 36:12 – Dane Fox (PP); 38:00 – John Mitchell
No scoring		Third period	58:34 – Leonhard Pföderl
Gustaf Wesslau (27 saves / 32 shots)		Goalie stats	Niklas Treutle (37 saves / 38 shots)

Nuremberg won series 4–2

==== ERC Ingolstadt vs. Adler Mannheim ====
14 March	ERC Ingolstadt	1–3	Adler Mannheim	Saturn Arena, Ingolstadt	Recap
No scoring		First period	No scoring
Thomas Greilinger – 37:09		Second period	No scoring
No scoring		Third period	51:05 – David Wolf; 51:58 – Devin Setoguchi (PP); 59:01 – Marcus Kink (ENG)
Timo Pielmeier (32 saves / 35 shots)		Goalie stats	Dennis Endras (29 saves / 30 shots)

16 March	Adler Mannheim	3–2	2OT	ERC Ingolstadt	SAP Arena, Mannheim	Recap
No scoring		First period		No scoring
Luke Adam – 21:42; Garrett Festerling (PP) – 27:48		Second period		No scoring
No scoring		Third period		45:37 – Thomas Greilinger; 53:37 – Ville Koistinen
Daniel Sparre – 83:45		Second overtime period		No scoring
Dennis Endras (35 saves / 37 shots)		Goalie stats		Timo Pielmeier (50 saves / 53 shots)

18 March	ERC Ingolstadt	4–3	OT	Adler Mannheim	Saturn Arena, Ingolstadt	Recap
Tim Stapleton (PP2) – 13:12		First period		No scoring
No scoring		Second period		22:23 – Phil Hungerecker
Ville Koistinen – 46:40; Thomas Greilinger – 50:51		Third period		49:45 – Marcel Goc; 52:52 – Daniel Sparre
Mike Collins – 72:59		First overtime period		No scoring
Timo Pielmeier (45 saves / 48 shots)		Goalie stats		Dennis Endras (24 saves / 28 shots)

20 March	Adler Mannheim	5–3	ERC Ingolstadt	SAP Arena, Mannheim	Recap
No scoring		First period	11:50 – David Elsner
Christoph Ullmann – 28:02; David Wolf – 38:33; Garrett Festerling – 39:11		Second period	22:37 – Mike Collins; 36:16– Mike Collins
Thomas Larkin – 42:18; Matthias Plachta – 51:06		Third period	No scoring
Dennis Endras (21 saves / 24 shots)		Goalie stats	Timo Pielmeier (31 saves / 36 shots)

23 March	ERC Ingolstadt	3–4	Adler Mannheim	Saturn Arena, Ingolstadt	Recap
No scoring		First period	01:03 – Phil Hungerecker; 10:25 – David Wolf
Brett Olson (PP) – 27:15; John Laliberte – 33:55		Second period	28:41 – Matthias Plachta; 32:52 – Mark Stuart
Laliberte – 56:29		Third period	No scoring
Timo Pielmeier (27 saves / 31 shots)		Goalie stats	Dennis Endras (30 saves / 33 shots)

Mannheim won series 4–1

=== Semifinals ===
The semifinals were played between 29 March 8 11 April 2018 in a best-of-seven mode.

==== EHC München vs. Adler Mannheim ====
29 March	EHC München	4–2	Adler Mannheim	Olympia Eishalle, Munich	Recap
Maximilian Kastner – 05:50; Dominik Kahun (PP2) – 19:24		First period	12:26 – Christoph Ullmann
Michael Wolf – 25:39		Second period	25:05 – Luke Adam
Wolf (PP) – 54:36		Third period	No scoring
Danny aus den Birken (29 saves / 31 shots)		Goalie stats	Dennis Endras (32 saves / 36 shots)

31 March	Adler Mannheim	4–2	EHC München	SAP Arena, Mannheim	Recap
Thomas Larkin – 00:39		First period	17:00 – Yannic Seidenberg
No scoring		Second period	No scoring
Christoph Ullmann – 52:03; Luke Adam – 52:54; Marcus Kink (ENG) – 59:16		Third period	40:28 – Jason Jaffray
Dennis Endras (30 saves / 32 shots)		Goalie stats	Danny aus den Birken (24 saves / 28 shots)

2 April	EHC München	2–1	2OT	Adler Mannheim	Olympia Eishalle, Munich	Recap
Michael Wolf (PP) – 08:17		First period		No scoring
No scoring		Second period		No scoring
No scoring		Third period		49:02 – Devin Setoguchi
Mads Christensen – 85:30		Second overtime period		No scoring
Danny aus den Birken (39 saves / 40 shots)		Goalie stats		Dennis Endras (36 saves / 38 shots)

4 April	Adler Mannheim	3–6	EHC München	SAP Arena, Mannheim	Recap
Brent Raedeke – 07:02; Patrick Mullen (PP) – 15:44		First period	No scoring
No scoring		Second period	23:31 – Markus Lauridsen; 24:55 – Patrick Hager (PP); 26:17 – Michael Wolf (PP); 39:23 – Konrad Abeltshauser
David Wolf – 48:40		Third period	41:40 – Jon Matsumoto (PP); 42:41 – Mads Christensen
Dennis Endras (15 saves / 21 shots)		Goalie stats	Danny aus den Birken (25 saves / 28 shots)

6 April	EHC München	5–0	Adler Mannheim	Olympia Eishalle, Munich	Recap
Mads Christensen – 00:45; Andreas Eder (PP) – 12:28; Dominik Kahun – 18:43		First period	No scoring
Keith Aulie – 24:40; Keith Aucoin – 29:37		Second period	No scoring
No scoring		Third period	No scoring
Danny aus den Birken (33 saves / 33 shots)		Goalie stats	Dennis Endras (30 saves / 35 shots)

Munich won series 4–1

==== Eisbären Berlin vs. Thomas Sabo Ice Tigers ====
29 March	Eisbären Berlin	5–1	Thomas Sabo Ice Tigers	Mercedes-Benz Arena, Berlin	Recap
Frank Hördler – 04:05		First period	No scoring
Nick Petersen – 29:24		Second period	36:53 – Yasin Ehliz (PP)
Jamie MacQueen (PP) – 47:43; Louis-Marc Aubry – 58:29; Petersen (ENG) – 59:05		Third period	No scoring
Petri Vehanen (26 saves / 27 shots)		Goalie stats	Niklas Treutle (45 saves / 50 shots)

31 March	Thomas Sabo Ice Tigers	3–2	OT	Eisbären Berlin	Arena Nürnberger Versicherung, Nuremberg	Recap
Leonhard Pföderl – 08:08		First period		10:37 – Nick Petersen
Leonhard Pföderl – 39:59		Second period		34:08 – Louis-Marc Aubry
No scoring		Third period		No scoring
John Mitchell – 76:50		First overtime period		No scoring
Niklas Treutle (55 saves / 57 shots)		Goalie stats		Petri Vehanen (46 saves / 49 shots)

2 April	Eisbären Berlin	4–3	OT	Thomas Sabo Ice Tigers	Mercedes-Benz Arena, Berlin	Recap
Rihards Bukarts – 10:48		First period		13:03 – Steven Reinprecht (PP)
Louis-Marc Aubry – 22:35; Marcel Noebels – 22:68		Second period		27:36 – Reinprecht
No scoring		Third period		40:26 – Yasin Ehliz (PP)
Nick Petersen – 60:23		First overtime period		No scoring
Petri Vehanen (28 saves / 31 shots)		Goalie stats		Niklas Treutle (33 saves / 37 shots)

4 April	Thomas Sabo Ice Tigers	4–1	Eisbären Berlin	Arena Nürnberger Versicherung, Nuremberg	Recap
Dane Fox – 06:51		First period	No scoring
No scoring		Second period	No scoring
Marius Möchel – 45:45; Leonhard Pföderl – 51:20; John Mitchell – 55:04		Third period	41:00 – Louis-Marc Aubry
Niklas Treutle (33 saves / 34 shots)		Goalie stats	Petri Vehanen (28 saves / 32 shots)

6 April	Eisbären Berlin	5–4	OT	Thomas Sabo Ice Tigers	Mercedes-Benz Arena, Berlin	Recap
Jamie MacQueen – 15:23		First period		No scoring
Marcel Noebels (PP) – 38:35		Second period		23:13 – Patrick Bjorkstrand; 24:44 – Brandon Segal
Nick Petersen – 44:08; Frank Hördler (PP) – 47:36		Third period		55:02 – Leonhard Pföderl; 55:36 – John Mitchell
Mark Olver – 71:07		First overtime period		No scoring
Petri Vehanen (33 saves / 37 shots)		Goalie stats		Niklas Treutle (53 saves / 58 shots)

8 April	Thomas Sabo Ice Tigers	2–3	Eisbären Berlin	Arena Nürnberger Versicherung, Nuremberg	Recap
Yasin Ehliz (PP) – 06:22		First period	08:53 – Frank Hördler
Leonhard Pföderl – 34:50		Second period	38:00 – Jamie MacQueen
No scoring		Third period	56:28 – Mark Olver
Niklas Treutle (29 saves / 32 shots)		Goalie stats	Petri Vehanen (27 saves / 29 shots)

Berlin won series 4–2

=== Final ===
The final was played between 13 and 26 April in a best-of-seven mode.

13 April	EHC München	3–4	Eisbären Berlin	Olympia Eishalle, Munich	Recap
Jon Matsumoto – 11:56		First period	01:10 – Jamie MacQueen; 14:53 – Sean Backman
Brooks Macek – 27:15		Second period	24:57 – James Sheppard
Keith Aucoin (EA) – 59:07		Third period	54:29 – Louis-Marc Aubry
Danny aus den Birken (23 saves / 27 shots)		Goalie stats	Petri Vehanen (38 saves / 41 shots)

15 April	Eisbären Berlin	4–5	EHC München	Mercedes-Benz Arena, Berlin	Recap
Sean Backman – 13:49		First period	12:27 – Brooks Macek (PP); 18:11 – Steven Pinizzotto (PP)
Nick Petersen – 37:19		Second period	23:05 – Florian Kettemer; 33:36 – Jon Matsumoto; 39:48 – Maximilian Kastner
Backman (PP) – 45:07; Petersen (EA) – 59:20		Third period	No scoring
Petri Vehanen (16 saves / 21 shots)		Goalie stats	Danny aus den Birken (33 saves / 37 shots)

18 April	EHC München	4–1	Eisbären Berlin	Olympia Eishalle, Munich	Recap
Yannic Seidenberg (PP) – 07:06		First period	No scoring
Jon Matsumoto (PP) – 27:39; Michael Wolf (PP) – 37:13		Second period	No scoring
Patrick Hager – 50:45		Third period	43:07 – Nick Petersen (PP)
Danny aus den Birken (26 saves / 27 shots)		Goalie stats	Petri Vehanen (41 saves / 45 shots)

20 April	Eisbären Berlin	2–4	EHC München	Mercedes-Benz Arena, Berlin	Recap
Jamie MacQueen – 05:21		First period	11:58 – Maximilian Kastner
Sean Backman – 26:04		Second period	34:37 – Jon Matsumoto; 38:16 – Yannic Seidenberg
No scoring		Third period	57:19 – Dominik Kahun
Petri Vehanen (31 saves / 35 shots)		Goalie stats	Danny aus den Birken (33 saves / 35 shots)

22 April	EHC München	5–6	Eisbären Berlin	Olympia Eishalle, Munich	Recap
Brooks Macek – 14:06		First period	06:39 – André Rankel; 12:27 – Thomas Oppenheimer; 17:24 – Jamie MacQueen
Mads Christensen – 25:30		Second period	38:37 – Rankel (PP)
Macek – 41:18; Jon Matsumoto (PP) – 47:12; Keith Aucoin – 54:58		Third period	47:32 – James Sheppard (PS, EA)
No scoring		Overtime	61:16 – MacQueen
Danny aus den Birken (27 saves / 31 shots)		Goalie stats	Petri Vehanen (28 saves / 33 shots)

24 April	Eisbären Berlin	5–3	EHC München	Mercedes-Benz Arena, Berlin	Recap
Louis-Marc Aubry – 03:38		First period	08:07 – Konrad Abeltshauser
Nick Petersen – 22:04		Second period	No scoring
Jamie MacQueen (PP) – 40:12; Daniel Fischbuch – 44:28; André Rankel (ENG) – 57:57		Third period	57:24 – Mads Christensen; 58:39 – Patrick Hager (EA)
Petri Vehanen (30 saves / 33 shots)		Goalie stats	Danny aus den Birken (29 saves / 34 shots)

26 April	EHC München	6–3	Eisbären Berlin	Olympia Eishalle, Munich	Recap
Konrad Abeltshauser – 12:42; Jon Matsumoto – 15:57; Steven Pinizzotto – 16:07; Mads Christensen – 19:21		First period	11:01 – Michael DuPont (PP)
Pinizzotto (PP) – 27:12		Second period	No scoring
Brooks Macek – 46:03		Third period	44:48 – Jamie MacQueen; 47:07 – Kai Wissmann
Danny aus den Birken (38 saves / 41 shots)		Goalie stats	Petri Vehanen (27 saves / 33 shots)

Munich won series 4–3

== Rule changes ==
- Midway through the season, the league implemented the "David Leggio Rule:" in the event the goaltender deliberately knocks the goalposts off its moorings to prevent a score, the score is awarded anyway. The rule is named after Leggio, a goaltender for Red Bull München who is infamous for the tactic.
