= David Wolf (ice hockey) =

German ice hockey player (born 1989)

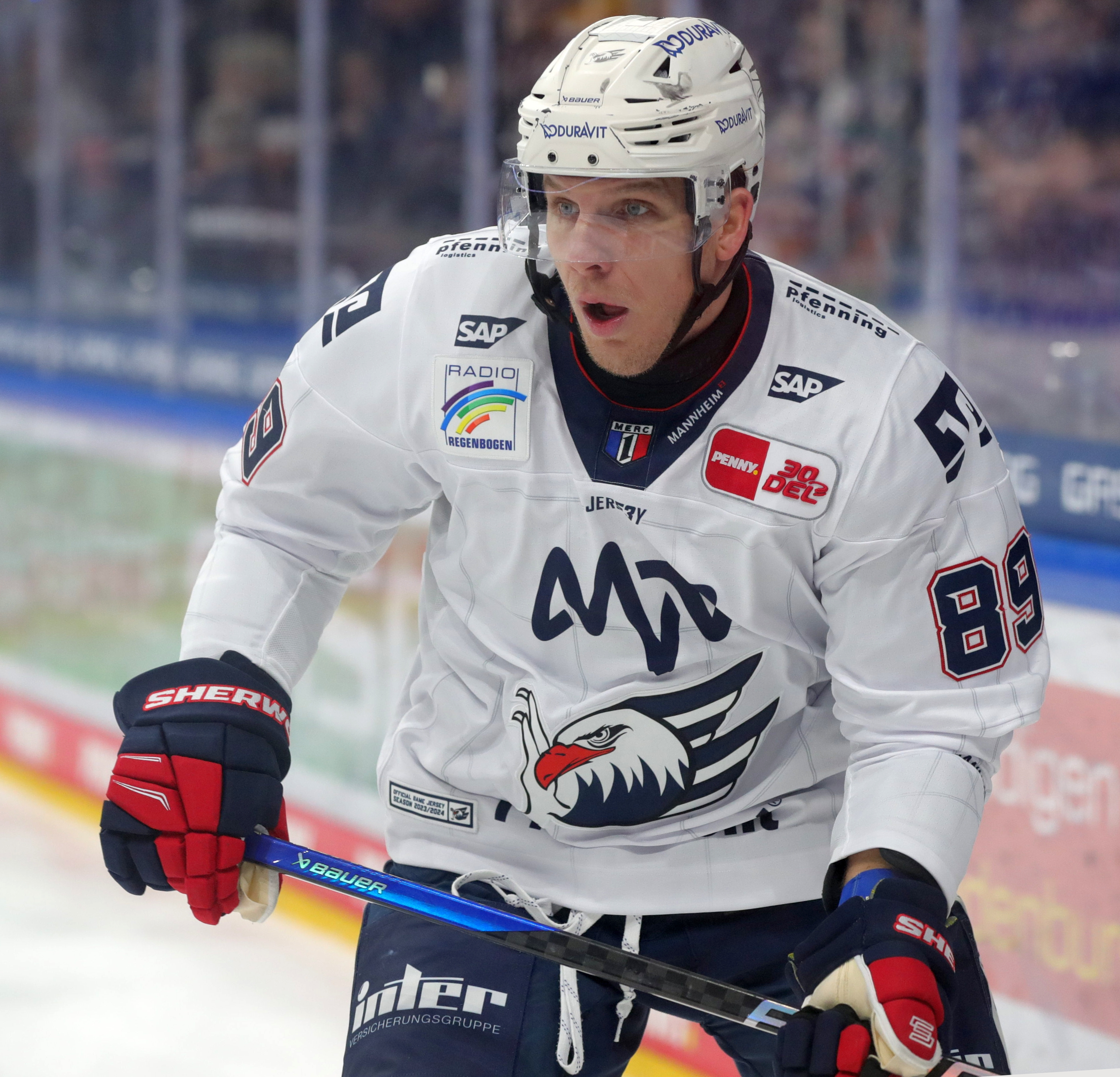
- Born: 15 September 1989 (age 36) Düsseldorf, West Germany
- Height: 6 ft 3 in (191 cm)
- Weight: 216 lb (98 kg; 15 st 6 lb)
- Position: Left wing
- Shot: Left
- DEL2 team Former teams: EC Kassel Huskies; Hannover Scorpions; Hamburg Freezers; Calgary Flames; Adler Mannheim
- National team: Germany
- NHL draft: Undrafted
- Playing career: 2007–2025

David Wolf (born 15 September 1989) is a German professional ice hockey player who currently plays for the EC Kassel Huskies of the Deutsche Eishockey Liga 2 (DEL). He played five seasons in the Deutsche Eishockey Liga (DEL) for the Hannover Scorpions and Hamburg Freezers between 2009 and 2014 before moving over to North America. Internationally, Wolf has represented Germany at both the junior and senior levels.

== Playing career ==
Wolf's first full season of professional hockey was the 2007–08 season. He appeared in 46 games for ETC Crimmitschau in the 2nd Bundesliga, the second level of German hockey. Following a 9-point season, Wolf returned to ETC Crimmitschau for the 2008–09 season, where he scored 8 points and recorded 120 penalty minutes in 36 games. Wolf was a member of the German national junior team at the 2009 World Junior Ice Hockey Championships. He scored one goal in the tournament against Canada, and recorded 53 penalty minutes in six games.

In 2009–10, Wolf moved up to the Deutsche Eishockey Liga (DEL) and joined the Hannover Scorpions. He played two seasons with Hannover before moving to the Hamburg Freezers in 2011. He earned a place on Hamburg's top line and enjoyed a dramatic increase in his offensive production; Wolf scored 35 points in 46 games in 2011–12 after recording only 6 in 51 games the year before. He also led the DEL with 167 penalty minutes. The National Hockey League's (NHL) Toronto Maple Leafs offered Wolf a try-out at their 2012 summer camp but he failed to stick with the team.

Wolf returned to Hamburg for the 2012–13 season, scoring a career-high 17 goals and adding 19 assists. He improved to 40 points the following season and again led the DEL in penalties with 152 minutes. Wolf also played with the German national team in that country's failed attempt to qualify for the 2014 Winter Olympics. Following the 2013–14 DEL season, Wolf left Germany intending to try to make the NHL. He signed a one-year, two-way contract with the Calgary Flames. The Flames assigned him to their American Hockey League (AHL) affiliate, the Adirondack Flames to begin the 2014–15 season. He scored 12 goals and added nine assists in his first 35 games with Adirondack before earning his first recall to Calgary on 26 Jan. 2015. Wolf made his NHL debut on 31 Jan., a 4–2 victory over the Edmonton Oilers. He suffered a laceration to this thigh during the game and missed the next three games due to the injury.

Wolf turned down offers to remain in North America and returned to Germany for the 2015-16 season, again signing with the Hamburg Freezers. Following the 2015-16 campaign, he was traded to fellow DEL side Adler Mannheim in exchange for Martin Buchwieser. Wolf signed a seven-year deal with the Adler organization.

On November 30, 2022, Wolf signed a one-year extension to remain with Adler Mannheim.

On January 12, 2025, Wolf signed a deal with EC Kassel Huskies of the DEL2 for the remainder of the 2024-25 season.

== Personal life ==
Wolf is a second-generation hockey player. His father, Manfred, was born in Canada but played professionally in Germany and twice represented West Germany at the Winter Olympics.

== Career statistics ==
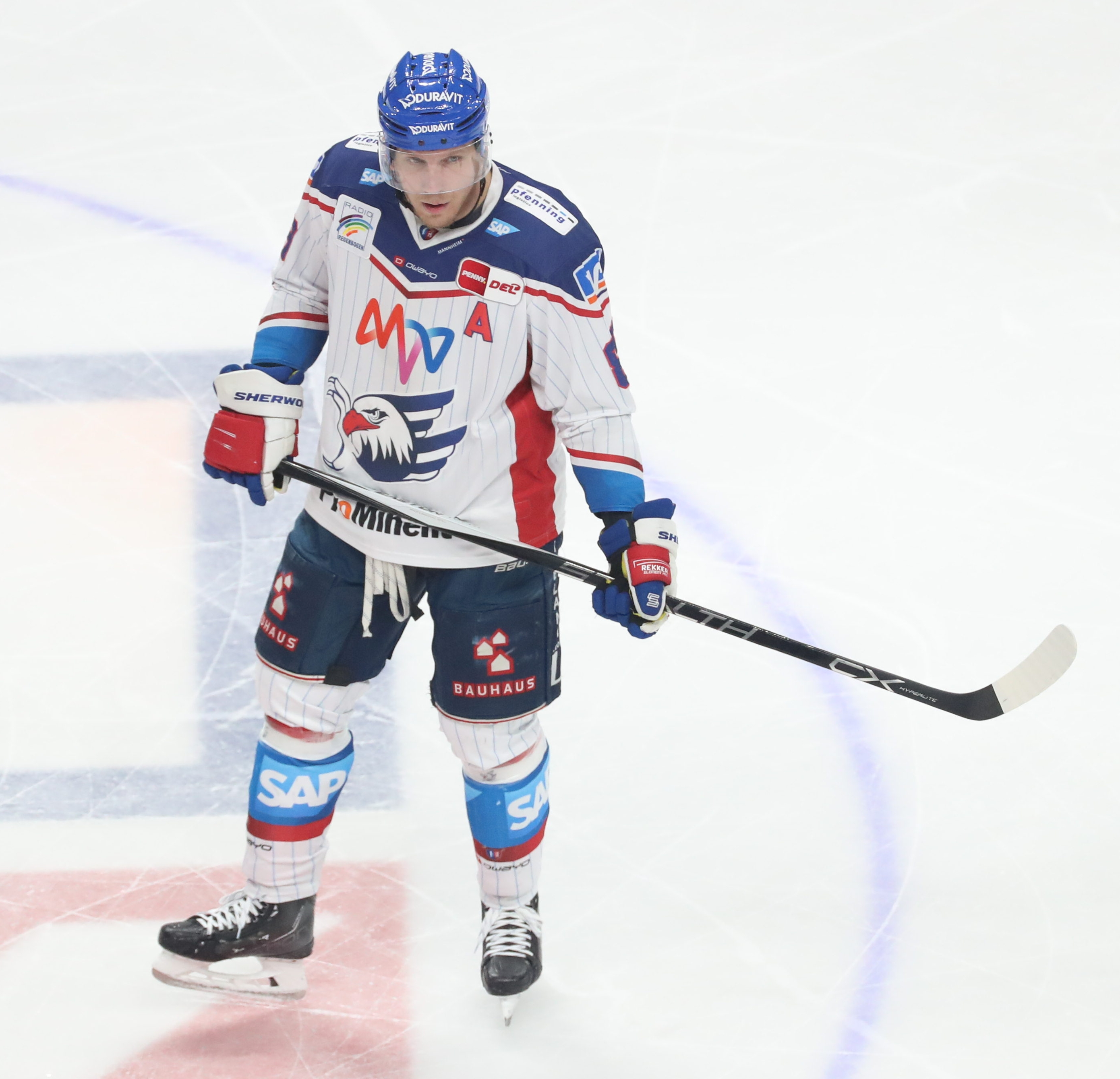
Wolf with Adler Mannheim in 2022

=== Regular season and playoffs ===
			Regular season					Playoffs
Season	Team	League	GP	G	A	Pts	PIM	GP	G	A	Pts	PIM
2005–06	Jungadler Mannheim	DNL	33	11	5	16	87	6	3	3	6	4
2006–07	Jungadler Mannheim	DNL	27	14	22	36	93	5	2	1	3	40
2006–07	Heilbronner Falken	GER.3	1	0	0	0	0	—	—	—	—	—
2007–08	ETC Crimmitschau	GER.2	46	7	2	9	40	6	0	1	1	6
2008–09	ETC Crimmitschau	GER.2	36	2	6	8	120	—	—	—	—	—
2009–10	Hannover Scorpions	DEL	54	4	7	11	40	11	3	0	3	12
2009–10	Fischtown Pinguins	GER.2	7	2	2	4	33	—	—	—	—	—
2010–11	Hannover Scorpions	DEL	51	2	4	6	97	4	1	1	2	52
2010–11	Hannover Indians	GER.2	1	0	3	3	4	—	—	—	—	—
2011–12	Hamburg Freezers	DEL	46	12	23	35	167	5	0	0	0	2
2012–13	Hamburg Freezers	DEL	49	17	19	36	96	6	1	3	4	26
2013–14	Hamburg Freezers	DEL	48	14	26	40	152	10	4	8	12	47
2014–15	Adirondack Flames	AHL	59	20	18	38	168	—	—	—	—	—
2014–15	Calgary Flames	NHL	3	0	0	0	2	1	0	0	0	0
2015–16	Hamburg Freezers	DEL	36	10	12	22	82	—	—	—	—	—
2016–17	Adler Mannheim	DEL	48	14	23	37	137	7	0	4	4	39
2017–18	Adler Mannheim	DEL	30	10	8	18	71	10	4	2	6	8
2018–19	Adler Mannheim	DEL	45	15	20	35	70	14	2	6	8	20
2019–20	Adler Mannheim	DEL	40	19	14	33	60	—	—	—	—	—
2020–21	Adler Mannheim	DEL	38	13	21	34	42	1	0	0	0	0
2021–22	Adler Mannheim	DEL	33	6	6	12	43	9	1	8	9	12
2022–23	Adler Mannheim	DEL	44	13	16	29	49	9	4	4	8	13
2023–24	Adler Mannheim	DEL	45	12	9	21	67	7	3	1	4	6
2024–25	EC Kassel Huskies	DEL2	14	0	5	5	10	10	2	1	3	24
DEL totals			607	161	208	369	1173	93	23	37	60	237
NHL totals			3	0	0	0	2	1	0	0	0	0

Medal record

Representing Germany

Ice hockey

Olympic Games
Silver medal – second place	2018 Pyeongchang	

=== International ===
Year	Team	Event	Result	GP	G	A	Pts	PIM
2007	Germany	WJC18	8th	1	0	0	0	0
2009	Germany	WJC	9th	6	1	0	1	53
2013	Germany	OGQ	DNQ	3	2	1	3	0
2016	Germany	OGQ	Q	3	0	0	0	4
2017	Germany	WC	8th	5	1	0	1	18
2018	Germany	OG	2nd place, silver medalist(s)	7	0	2	2	2
2022	Germany	OG	10th	3	0	0	0	31
Junior totals				7	1	0	1	53
Senior totals				21	3	3	6	55

== Awards and honours ==
Award	Year
DEL
Champion (Hannover Scorpions)	2010
Champion (Adler Mannheim)	2019
