= Uvira (disambiguation) =

Uvira is a city in the Democratic Republic of the Congo. Uvira may also refer to:

== People ==
- Eduard Uvíra (born 1961), Czech ice hockey player
- Sebastian Uvira (born 1993), German ice hockey player

== Other uses ==
- Uvira Territory, territory in the Democratic Republic of the Congo
- Roman Catholic Diocese of Uvira, diocese in the Democratic Republic of the Congo
