= Buchwieser =

Buchwieser is a German surname. Notable people with the surname include:

- Bruno Buchwieser, Austrian architect
- Cathinka Buchwieser (1789–1828), German soprano and actress
- Martin Buchwieser (born 1989), German ice hockey player
