= John Mitchell (ice hockey, born 1985) =

Canadian ice hockey player (born 1985)

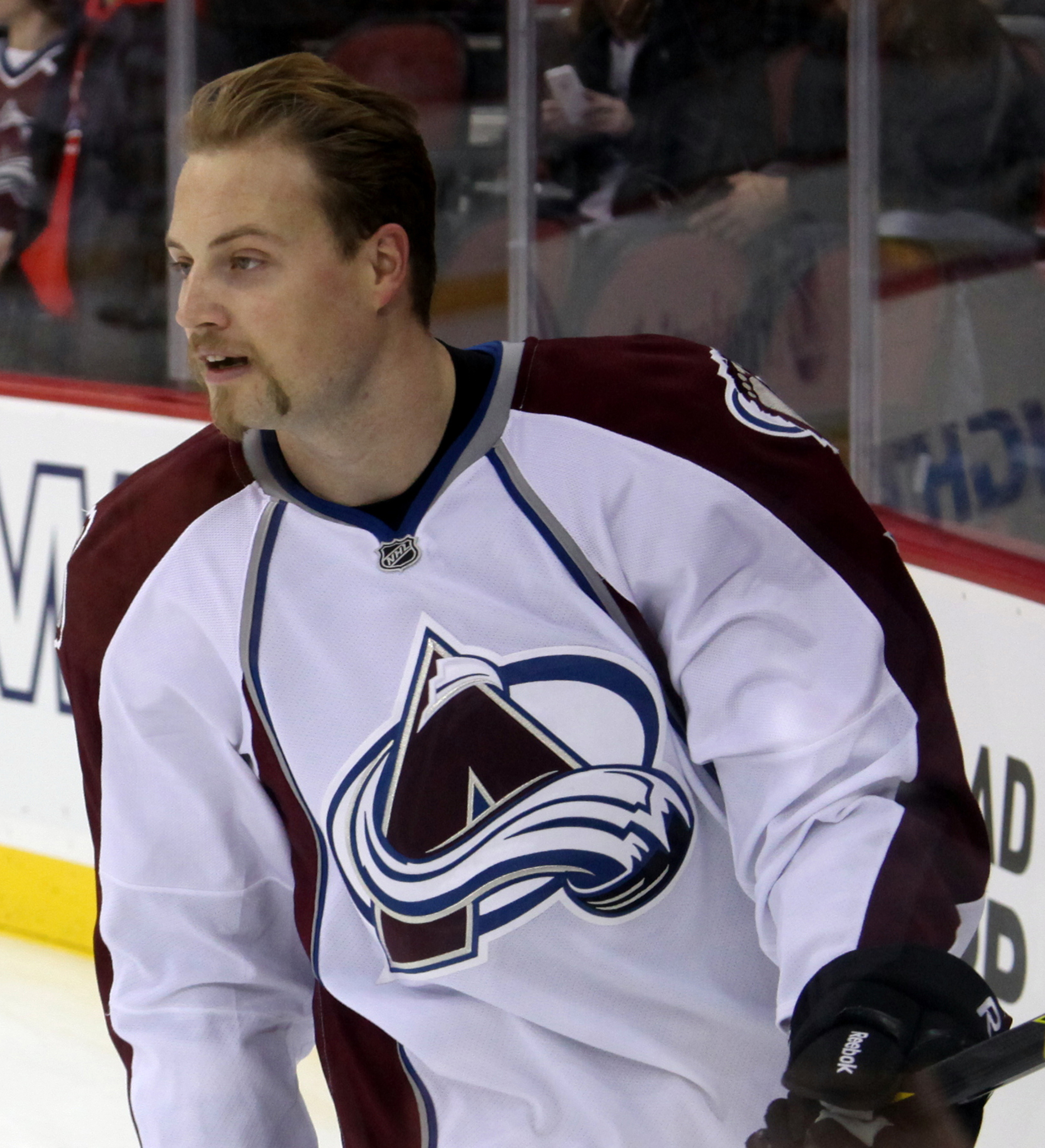
- Mitchell with the Colorado Avalanche in November 2014
- Born: January 22, 1985 (age 41) Oakville, Ontario, Canada
- Height: 6 ft 1 in (185 cm)
- Weight: 210 lb (95 kg; 15 st 0 lb)
- Position: Centre
- Shot: Left
- Played for: Toronto Maple Leafs; New York Rangers; Colorado Avalanche; Thomas Sabo Ice Tigers; EHC München
- NHL draft: 158th overall, 2003; Toronto Maple Leafs
- Playing career: 2005–2019

John Mitchell (born January 22, 1985) is a Canadian former professional ice hockey centre who played in the National Hockey League (NHL) with the Toronto Maple Leafs, New York Rangers and Colorado Avalanche. He was drafted in the fifth round, 158th overall by the Toronto Maple Leafs in the 2003 NHL entry draft.

== Playing career ==
Mitchell grew up in Waterloo, Ontario, playing minor hockey for the Waterloo Wolves of the Alliance Pavilion League. In the 2000–01 season, Mitchell led his Waterloo Wolves Bantams to a solid season and was selected in the first round (19th overall) of the 2001 OHL Priority Selection by the Plymouth Whalers. Mitchell was selected in the first round, 19th overall, of the 2001 OHL Priority Selection Draft by the Plymouth Whalers. He served as captain of the Whalers in his final season with the team.

He was drafted by the Toronto Maple Leafs and played for their American Hockey League (AHL) affiliate Toronto Marlies for three seasons. He began the 2008–09 NHL season with the Toronto Maple Leafs of the NHL. On November 1, 2008, he scored his first two career goals against Stephen Valiquette of the New York Rangers in a 5–2 win. He was also selected as the game's first star.

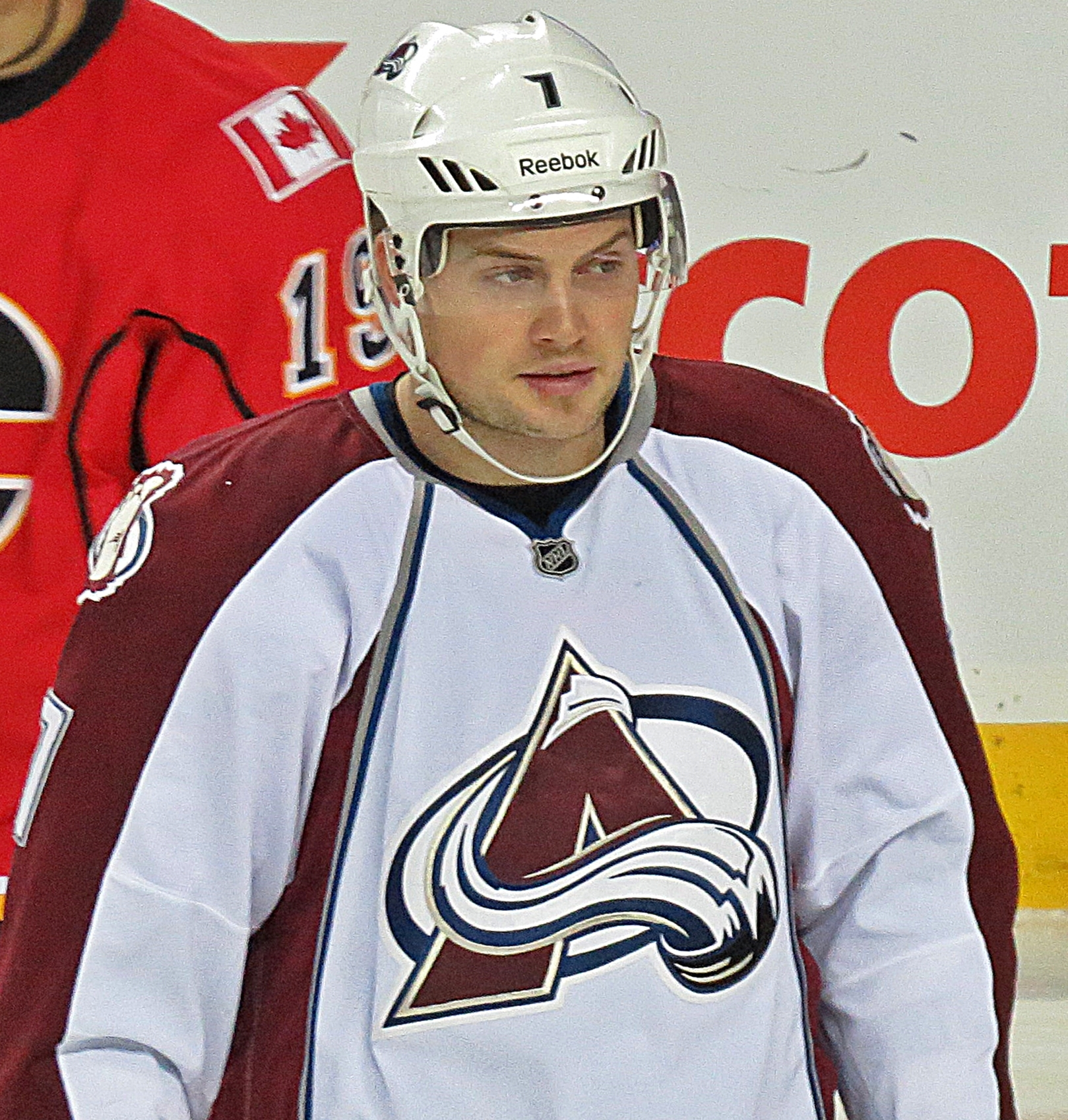
Mitchell with the Colorado Avalanche in December 2013

On February 28, 2011, Mitchell was traded from the Toronto Maple Leafs to the New York Rangers in exchange for a seventh round draft pick in 2012. After starting the 2011–12 season with the Rangers AHL affiliate Connecticut Whale, Mitchell was called up to the Rangers for a game on November 25, 2011, in which he registered his first point for the Rangers by assisting on a goal by Brian Boyle.

On July 1, 2012, Mitchell signed a two-year contract as a free agent with the Colorado Avalanche. In the lockout shortened 2012–13 season, Mitchell scored a goal on his first shift in his Avalanche debut in their season opener against the Minnesota Wild on January 19, 2013. On January 31, Mitchell tied a career high in scoring two goals and adding an assist in a 6–3 victory over the Calgary Flames. Whilst short of team success, he showed his versatility in a checking and offensive role in scoring 10 goals and 20 points in 47 games.

In the following 2013–14 season, Mitchell scored his 100th career point in recording 2 assists in a 3–2 shootout victory over the Minnesota Wild on November 30, 2013. He later appeared in his 300th career game on December 14, also against the Wild. On March 14, 2014, he was rewarded for his play in signing to a three-year contract extension through the 2016–17 season to remain with the Avalanche. After suffering a concussion, approaching the playoffs, Mitchell was sidelined for the remainder of the campaign. He recorded a career high 21 assists and 32 points in 75 games.

Leading into the final year of his contract with the Avalanche, Mitchell was injured during training camp with a hip flexor issue, ruling him out of the beginning of the 2016–17 season. He missed the first 5 games of the year before he returned to health and was included in the lineup on October 28, 2016, in a 1–0 defeat to the Winnipeg Jets. After four scoreless games centering the fourth-line under the direction of new head coach, Jared Bednar, Mitchell was surprisingly placed on waivers by the Avalanche on November 4, 2016. Mitchell went unclaimed and continued to remain on the Colorado roster. Drawing back into the lineup, Mitchell played out the final year of his contract scoring a career low 3 goals and 7 points in 65 games for the bottom placed Avalanche.

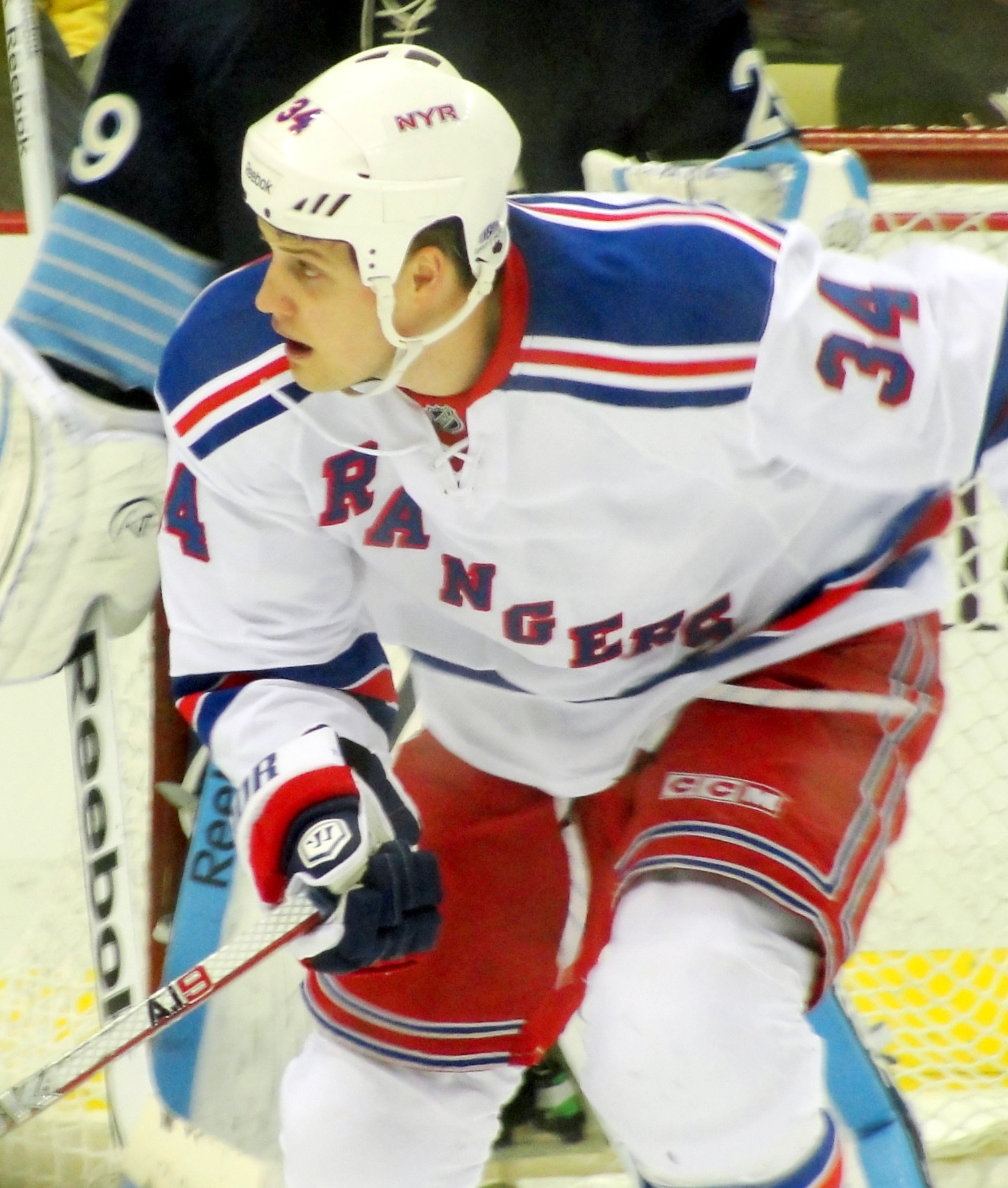
Mitchell with the New York Rangers in 2012

As a free agent in the off-season, Mitchell was not given a contract offer, he later signed a professional try-out contract to attend the training camp of the Chicago Blackhawks on September 11, 2017. On September 21, 2017, Mitchell was released from the Blackhawks roster and immediately signed to another PTO to join the Columbus Blue Jackets pre-season roster. On September 27, he was released by the Blue Jackets for a second time within a week. The following day he signed a professional try-out contract to begin the season with the Blue Jackets AHL affiliate, the Cleveland Monsters. He began the 2017–18 season with the Monsters, adding a goal and assist in 3 games before he opted for a release from his tryout on October 16, 2017. On October 23, Mitchell opted to embark on a European career in signing with the Thomas Sabo Ice Tigers of the Deutsche Eishockey Liga. He appeared in 49 DEL games for Nürnberg during the 2017–18 campaign, scoring 17 goals while assisting on 26 more.

On May 4, 2018, Mitchell left the Ice Tigers as a free agent and inked a one-year deal with current German champions EHC München. In the 2018–19 season, Mitchell scored 38 points in 43 regular season games, helping Red Bull return to the Finals for the fourth consecutive year with 7 points in 18 games. After a finals defeat to Adler Mannheim, Mitchell concluded his professional playing career after 14 seasons.

== Career statistics ==
			Regular season					Playoffs
Season	Team	League	GP	G	A	Pts	PIM	GP	G	A	Pts	PIM
2000–01	Waterloo Siskins	MWJHL	47	15	29	44	33	4	1	2	3	0
2001–02	Plymouth Whalers	OHL	62	9	9	18	23	6	1	0	1	4
2002–03	Plymouth Whalers	OHL	68	18	37	55	31	18	2	10	12	8
2003–04	Plymouth Whalers	OHL	65	28	54	82	45	9	6	6	12	6
2004–05	Plymouth Whalers	OHL	63	25	50	75	59	4	1	1	2	0
2004–05	St. John's Maple Leafs	AHL	2	0	0	0	0	—	—	—	—	—
2005–06	Toronto Marlies	AHL	51	5	12	17	22	2	0	0	0	0
2006–07	Toronto Marlies	AHL	73	16	20	36	46	—	—	—	—	—
2007–08	Toronto Marlies	AHL	79	20	31	51	56	19	8	4	12	12
2008–09	Toronto Maple Leafs	NHL	76	12	17	29	33	—	—	—	—	—
2009–10	Toronto Maple Leafs	NHL	60	6	17	23	31	—	—	—	—	—
2010–11	Toronto Maple Leafs	NHL	23	2	1	3	12	—	—	—	—	—
2010–11	Toronto Marlies	AHL	10	1	4	5	2	—	—	—	—	—
2010–11	Connecticut Whale	AHL	14	7	5	12	10	6	3	3	6	0
2011–12	Connecticut Whale	AHL	17	7	7	14	20	—	—	—	—	—
2011–12	New York Rangers	NHL	63	5	11	16	8	18	0	1	1	2
2012–13	Colorado Avalanche	NHL	47	10	10	20	18	—	—	—	—	—
2013–14	Colorado Avalanche	NHL	75	11	21	32	36	—	—	—	—	—
2014–15	Colorado Avalanche	NHL	68	11	15	26	32	—	—	—	—	—
2015–16	Colorado Avalanche	NHL	71	10	11	21	52	—	—	—	—	—
2016–17	Colorado Avalanche	NHL	65	3	4	7	45	—	—	—	—	—
2017–18	Cleveland Monsters	AHL	3	1	1	2	0	—	—	—	—	—
2017–18	Thomas Sabo Ice Tigers	DEL	37	12	20	32	42	12	5	6	11	4
2018–19	EHC Red Bull München	DEL	43	13	25	38	34	18	3	4	7	37
NHL totals			548	70	107	177	267	18	0	1	1	2
