= Louis-Marc Aubry =

Canadian ice hockey player (born 1991)

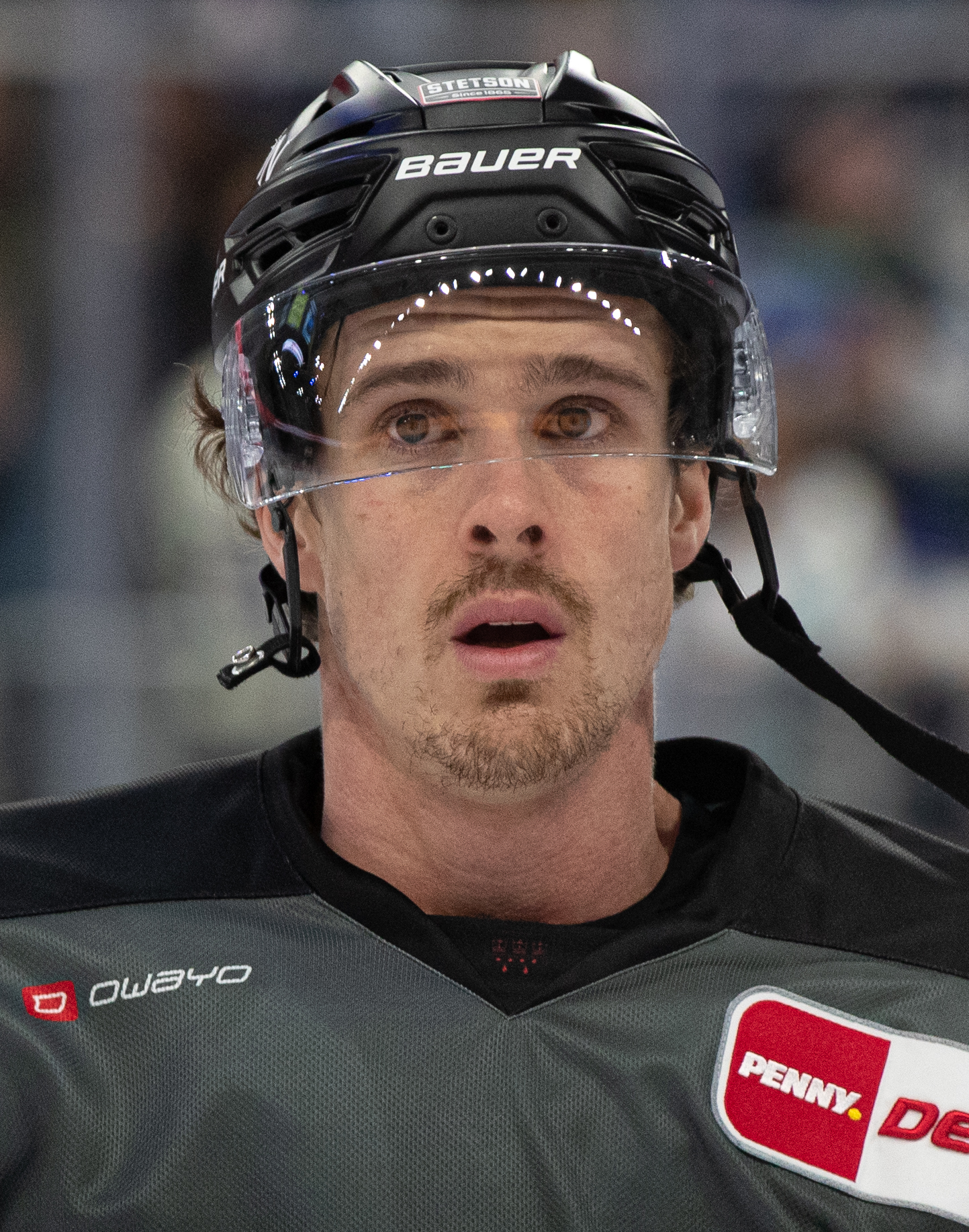
- Aubry with the Kölner Haie in 2025
- Born: November 11, 1991 (age 34) Trois-Rivières, Quebec, Canada
- Height: 6 ft 4 in (193 cm)
- Weight: 208 lb (94 kg; 14 st 12 lb)
- Position: Centre
- Shoots: Left
- DEL team Former teams: Kölner Haie; Grand Rapids Griffins; Eisbären Berlin; ERC Ingolstadt
- NHL draft: 81st overall, 2010; Detroit Red Wings
- Playing career: 2011–present

Louis-Marc Aubry (born November 11, 1991) is a Canadian professional ice hockey player who is currently playing for the Kölner Haie of the Deutsche Eishockey Liga (DEL). Aubry was drafted 81st overall by the Detroit Red Wings in the 2010 NHL entry draft.

== Playing career ==
=== Junior ===
During the 2008–09 QMJHL season, in his rookie season, Aubry recorded 10 goals and 12 assists in 65 games for the Montreal Juniors. Aubry also played in 10 playoff games for the club, recording two goals and two assists.

During the 2009–10 QMJHL season, Aubry played 66 games for the Montreal Juniors, recording 15 goals and 18 assists. In seven playoff games for Montreal, Aubry recorded one goal and one assist. Aubry scored an empty net goal for the victorious Team Cherry at the 2010 CHL Top Prospects Game.

During the 2010–11 QMJHL season, Aubry started off the year strong as a member of the Montreal Juniors before going down with an injury. Aubry played in 35 games, finishing the season with 13 goals and 12 assists. In 10 playoff games for Montreal, Aubry recorded five goals and one assist.

=== Professional ===
On November 9, 2010, the Detroit Red Wings signed Aubry to a three-year entry-level contract.

He was good During the 2011–12 AHL season, Aubry made his professional hockey debut as a 20-year-old, skating in 62 games for Detroit's AHL affiliate Grand Rapids Griffins, where he recorded five goals and 11 assists.

During the 2012–13 AHL season, Aubry recorded four goals and eight assists in 64 games. The Griffins finished first in the Midwest Division and captured the Calder Cup championship. Aubrey played in 14 of 24 playoff games, recording one assist.

In the following 2014–15 season, Aubry recorded five goals and 11 assists in 67 games. On July 15, 2015, the Red Wings signed Aubry to a one-year contract extension. During the 2015–16 season, Aubry recorded career highs in points (29), goals (12), assists (17), and games played (75). On August 18, 2016, Aubry signed a one-year contract with the Grand Rapids Griffins.

He made 36 appearances for the Griffins in the 2016–17 campaign, scoring four goals and assisting on five more, before taking his game to Germany, signing with DEL side Eisbären Berlin on February 2, 2017. He signed a deal for the remainder of the season with the Eisbären squad and on May 16, 2017, put pen to paper on a fresh one-year deal.

He nearly made his NHL Debut at Penguins on December 3 2016 but not listed on roster spend down AHL After Game

Having left Berlin as a free agent after four seasons, Aubry continued in the DEL in agreeing to a one-year contract with ERC Ingolstadt on November 16, 2020.

On May 6, 2022, Aubry joined his third DEL club as a free agent, signing a one-year contract with Kölner Haie for the 2022–23 season.

== Career statistics ==
			Regular season					Playoffs
Season	Team	League	GP	G	A	Pts	PIM	GP	G	A	Pts	PIM
2008–09	Montreal Junior Hockey Club	QMJHL	65	10	12	22	53	10	2	2	4	8
2009–10	Montreal Junior Hockey Club	QMJHL	66	15	18	33	69	7	1	1	2	6
2010–11	Montreal Junior Hockey Club	QMJHL	35	13	12	25	26	10	5	1	6	2
2011–12	Grand Rapids Griffins	AHL	62	5	11	16	39	—	—	—	—	—
2012–13	Grand Rapids Griffins	AHL	64	4	8	12	60	14	0	1	1	0
2013–14	Grand Rapids Griffins	AHL	38	2	2	4	16	—	—	—	—	—
2013–14	Toledo Walleye	ECHL	18	7	8	15	10	—	—	—	—	—
2014–15	Grand Rapids Griffins	AHL	67	5	11	16	52	16	3	0	3	16
2015–16	Grand Rapids Griffins	AHL	75	12	17	29	87	9	1	0	1	0
2016–17	Grand Rapids Griffins	AHL	36	4	5	9	17	—	—	—	—	—
2016–17	Eisbären Berlin	DEL	7	2	3	5	29	9	2	3	5	6
2017–18	Eisbären Berlin	DEL	40	11	12	23	41	18	10	9	19	22
2018–19	Eisbären Berlin	DEL	48	16	23	39	67	8	0	2	2	14
2019–20	Eisbären Berlin	DEL	39	7	14	21	24	—	—	—	—	—
2020–21	ERC Ingolstadt	DEL	33	11	10	21	32	5	6	3	9	10
2021–22	ERC Ingolstadt	DEL	47	13	17	30	50	2	0	1	1	2
2022–23	Kölner Haie	DEL	53	19	37	56	45	5	0	3	3	6
2023–24	Kölner Haie	DEL	52	15	20	35	36	3	0	2	2	6
AHL totals			342	32	54	86	271	39	4	1	5	16
DEL totals			319	94	136	230	324	50	18	24	42	66

== Awards and honors ==
Award	Year
AHL
Calder Cup (Grand Rapids Griffins)	2013
