= Keith Aucoin =

American ice hockey player (born 1978)

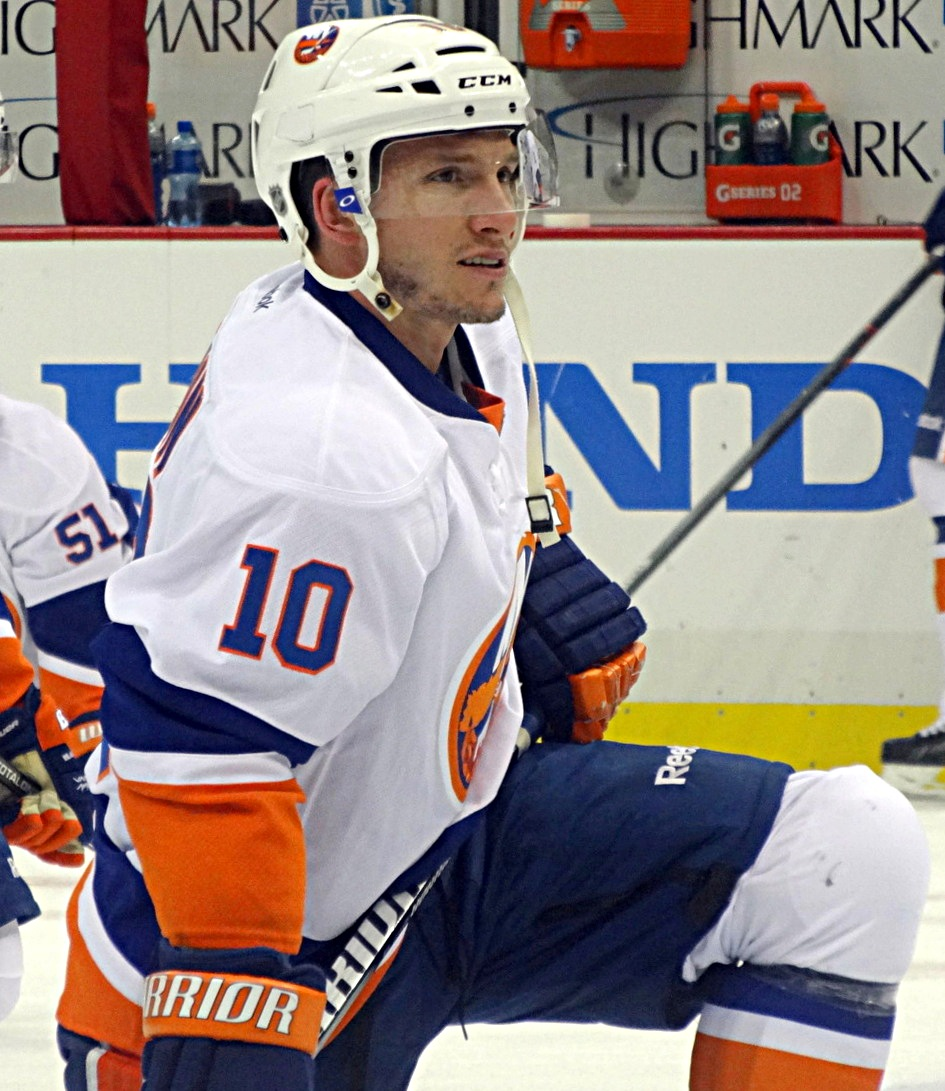
- Aucoin with the Islanders during the 2013 Stanley Cup playoffs.
- Born: November 6, 1978 (age 47) Waltham, Massachusetts, U.S.
- Height: 5 ft 8 in (173 cm)
- Weight: 171 lb (78 kg; 12 st 3 lb)
- Position: Center
- Shot: Right
- Played for: Carolina Hurricanes; Washington Capitals; New York Islanders; St. Louis Blues; HC Ambrì-Piotta; EHC München
- NHL draft: Undrafted
- Playing career: 2001–2018

Keith M. Aucoin (born November 6, 1978) is an American former professional ice hockey player who played in the National Hockey League (NHL) for the Carolina Hurricanes, Washington Capitals, New York Islanders, and St. Louis Blues.

== Playing career ==
He was raised in Waltham and then Chelmsford, Massachusetts, and attended Chelmsford High School. Aucoin spent four seasons with Norwich University in Northfield, Vermont, where he was the leading scorer in the 1999 NCAA Division III men's ice hockey tournament, before turning professional in 2001. Aucoin made his NHL debut during the 2005–06 NHL season with the Carolina Hurricanes. It was at the end of this season that he was a member of the "Black Aces," a group of players kept on the roster as healthy scratches for the Hurricanes' playoff run that ended with the Hurricanes being crowned Stanley Cup champions. Aucoin did not have his name added to the cup as he did not play in any of the playoff games, but can be seen on the ice during the celebration and did receive a championship ring. He would go on to play 53 regular season games for the Hurricanes over three seasons, scoring 5 goals and 15 points.

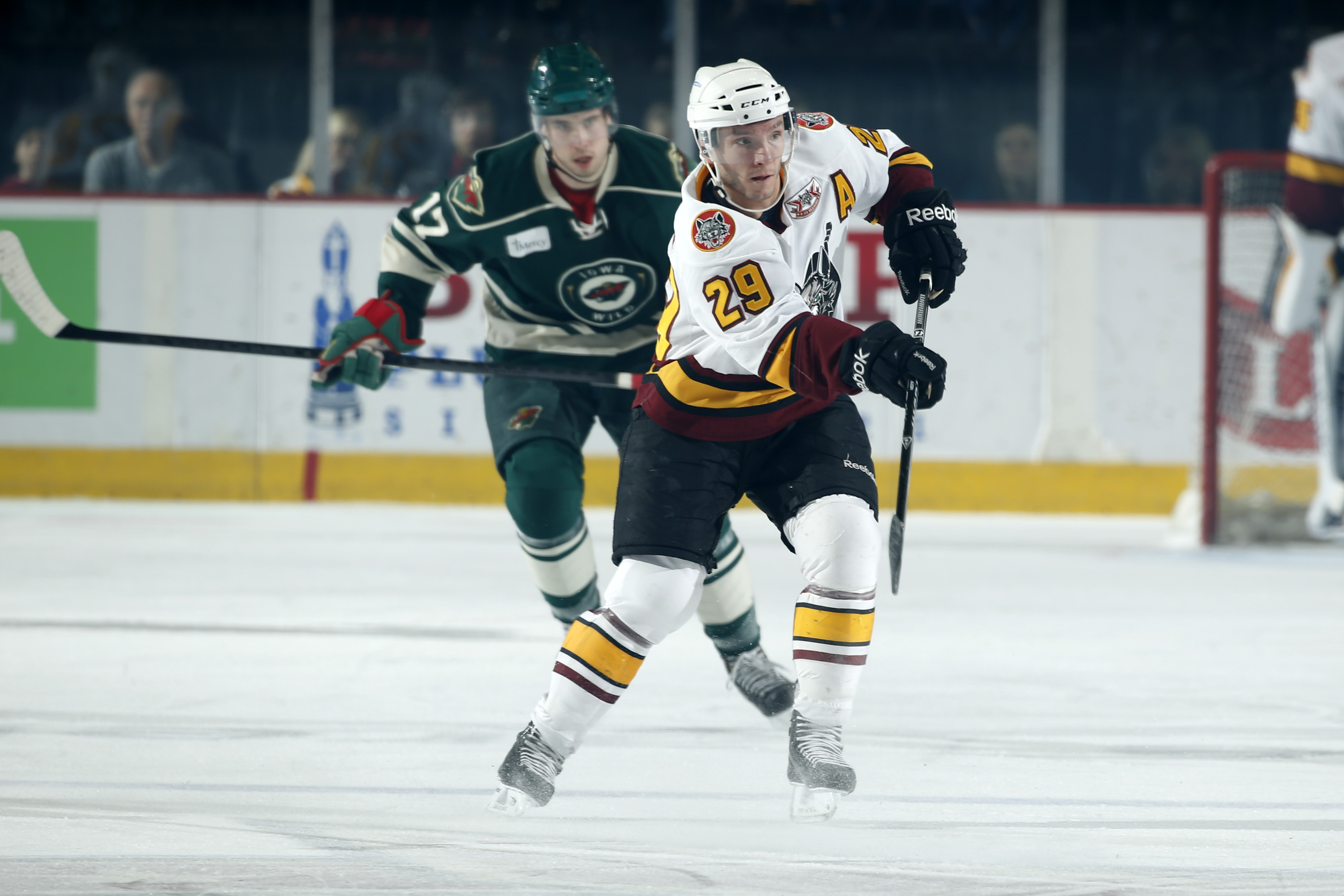
Aucoin in action with the Chicago Wolves in 2014.

On July 3, 2008, Aucoin signed with the Washington Capitals. After attending the Capitals training camp for the 2008–09 season, the Capitals sent Aucoin to their AHL affiliate, the Hershey Bears. Aucoin's presence with Hershey had an immediate impact as he won the Reebok Player of the Week honors on October 12, 2008, and then the AHL Player of the Month for October 2008. In his first 20 games of 2008, he scored 8 goals with 21 assists. In December 2008, Aucoin was called up to the NHL with the Capitals, playing in 12 games, scoring two goals and assisting on four. He was reassigned back to the Bears for the playoffs where he won the Calder Cup in six games over the Manitoba Moose.

During the 2009–10 season, Aucoin was re-signed to a two-year contract extension on March 8, 2010. In helping the Bears capture a second consecutive Calder Cup, he was awarded the Les Cunningham Award as the league's most valuable player during the regular season.

For the 2011–12 season, Aucoin made the Capitals opening night roster due to injuries of other forwards. He played in 27 games for 11 points over the course of the season and was a regular in the playoffs. It was the most time he spent in the NHL since 2008.

On July 21, 2012, Keith signed a one-year two-way deal with the Toronto Maple Leafs organization. With the intention to bolster the offense of Maple Leafs affiliate, the Toronto Marlies, Aucoin was directly assigned to the AHL to start the 2012–13 season. After the resolution of the NHL lockout, Aucoin was recalled to the Maple Leafs training camp. On reassignment to the Marlies, he was claimed off waivers from the New York Islanders on January 17, 2013. Despite the shortened season, Aucoin played his first full season in the NHL. In 41 games, he produced 6 goals and 12 points in a checking line role and helped the Islanders return to the playoffs for the first time since 2007.

On July 5, 2013, Keith signed as a free agent to a one-year deal with the St. Louis Blues organization. Aucoin's contract with the Blues was not renewed at the end of the season.

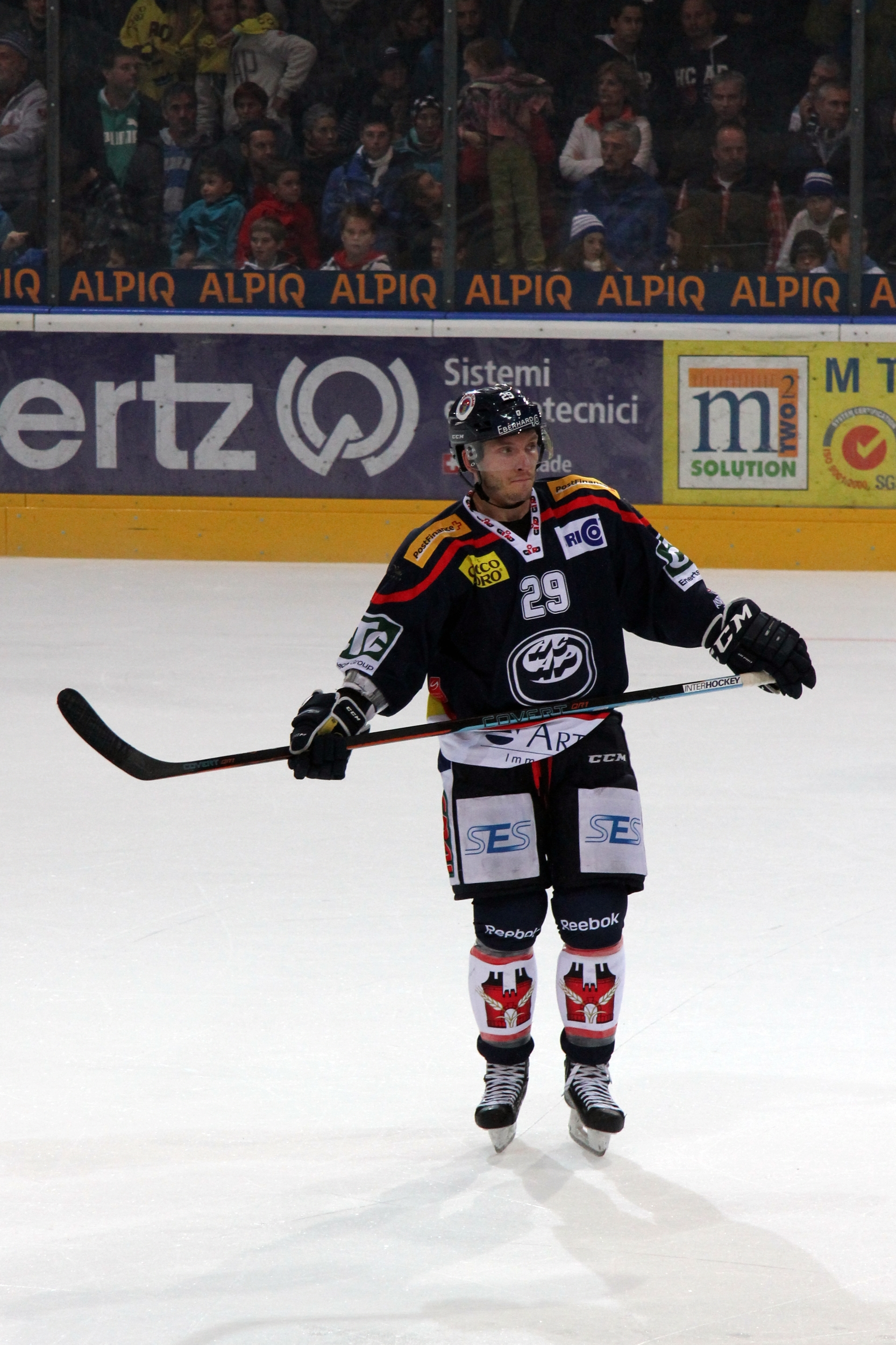
Keith Aucoin with Ambrì in 2014

On June 13, 2014, after failing to secure a tryout with any other NHL team, Aucoin signed a two-year deal with Swiss club, HC Ambrì-Piotta of the National League A. Aucoin enjoyed a successful debut season in Europe with Piotta, contributing with 31 points in 41 regular season games. Unable to progress to the playoffs, Aucoin left Switzerland after one season, to sign a one-year contract in Germany with EHC München of the Deutsche Eishockey Liga (DEL) on June 19, 2015. He remained with EHC München for his final three seasons before officially retiring in 2018.

Having played the majority of his career in the AHL, Aucoin finishing seventh all-time in league scoring was later inducted as a part of the 2022 Class to the AHL Hall of Fame.

== Post-playing career ==
Aucoin returned to Massachusetts following his 17 year professional career, spending four seasons (2018–2022) within the coaching ranks of the EHL with the Boston Jr. Rangers and Worcester Jr. Railers.

Prior to the 2022–23 season, Aucoin accepted a professional scouting position with the Colorado Avalanche of the NHL.

== Personal ==
Keith's younger brother, Phil Aucoin (born 1981), also played professional ice hockey.

== Career statistics ==
			Regular season					Playoffs
Season	Team	League	GP	G	A	Pts	PIM	GP	G	A	Pts	PIM
1995–96	Chelmsford High School	HS–MA
1996–97	Chelmsford High School	HS–MA
1997–98	Norwich University	ECAC East	26	19	14	33	16	—	—	—	—	—
1998–99	Norwich University	ECAC East	31	33	39	72	14	—	3	7	10	—
1999–2000	Norwich University	ECAC East	31	36	41	77	14	—	—	—	—	—
2000–01	Norwich University	ECAC East	28	26	30	56	26	—	—	—	—	—
2001–02	B.C. Icemen	UHL	44	23	35	58	42	10	3	5	8	4
2001–02	Florida Everblades	ECHL	1	0	2	2	0	—	—	—	—	—
2001–02	Lowell Lock Monsters	AHL	30	6	10	16	8	—	—	—	—	—
2002–03	Providence Bruins	AHL	78	25	49	74	71	4	0	1	1	6
2003–04	Cincinnati Mighty Ducks	AHL	80	18	30	48	64	9	0	3	3	4
2004–05	Memphis RiverKings	CHL	5	4	5	9	10	—	—	—	—	—
2004–05	Providence Bruins	AHL	72	21	45	66	49	17	4	14	18	18
2005–06	Lowell Lock Monsters	AHL	72	29	56	85	68	—	—	—	—	—
2005–06	Carolina Hurricanes	NHL	6	0	1	1	4	—	—	—	—	—
2006–07	Albany River Rats	AHL	65	27	72	99	108	5	1	3	4	7
2006–07	Carolina Hurricanes	NHL	8	0	1	1	0	—	—	—	—	—
2007–08	Albany River Rats	AHL	38	8	37	45	38	—	—	—	—	—
2007–08	Carolina Hurricanes	NHL	38	5	8	13	10	—	—	—	—	—
2008–09	Hershey Bears	AHL	70	25	71	96	73	21	5	18	23	16
2008–09	Washington Capitals	NHL	12	2	4	6	4	—	—	—	—	—
2009–10	Hershey Bears	AHL	72	35	71	106	49	21	2	23	25	2
2009–10	Washington Capitals	NHL	9	1	4	5	0	—	—	—	—	—
2010–11	Hershey Bears	AHL	53	18	54	72	49	6	2	6	8	2
2010–11	Washington Capitals	NHL	1	0	0	0	0	—	—	—	—	—
2011–12	Washington Capitals	NHL	27	3	8	11	0	14	0	2	2	2
2011–12	Hershey Bears	AHL	43	11	59	70	34	—	—	—	—	—
2012–13	Toronto Marlies	AHL	34	10	27	37	40	—	—	—	—	—
2012–13	New York Islanders	NHL	41	6	6	12	4	6	0	3	3	10
2013–14	Chicago Wolves	AHL	62	11	32	43	24	9	2	4	6	2
2013–14	St. Louis Blues	NHL	2	0	0	0	0	—	—	—	—	—
2014–15	HC Ambrì–Piotta	NLA	41	7	24	31	18	—	—	—	—	—
2015–16	EHC München	DEL	51	13	28	41	34	14	2	12	14	2
2016–17	EHC München	DEL	52	15	34	49	52	14	4	8	12	10
2017–18	EHC München	DEL	52	11	52	63	18	17	4	11	15	2
AHL totals			769	244	613	857	675	92	16	72	87	57
NHL totals			145	17	32	49	22	20	0	5	5	12
DEL totals			155	39	115	154	104	45	10	31	41	14

== Awards and honors ==
Award	Year
College
ECAC East First All-Conference Team	2000, 2001
ECAC East Player of the Year	2000, 2001
NCAA Division III Champion	2000
AHL
All-Star Game	2006, 2007, 2008, 2009, 2010, 2012
Second All-Star Team	2006, 2007, 2011
First All-Star Team	2009, 2010, 2012
Calder Cup Champion	2009, 2010
John B. Sollenberger Trophy	2010
Les Cunningham Award	2010
DEL
Champion	2016, 2017, 2018
Forward of the Year	2018
Player of the Year	2018
