= Manfred Wolf (ice hockey) =

German ice hockey player

Personal information
- Nationality: German
- Born: 26 March 1957 (age 68); Toronto, Ontario, Canada

Sport
- Sport: Ice hockey

Manfred Wolf (born 26 March 1957) is a Canadian-born German former ice hockey player and coach. He competed in the men's tournaments at the 1984 Winter Olympics and the 1988 Winter Olympics. He is the father of ice hockey player David Wolf.
