= Christoph Hoehenleitner =

German ice hockey player

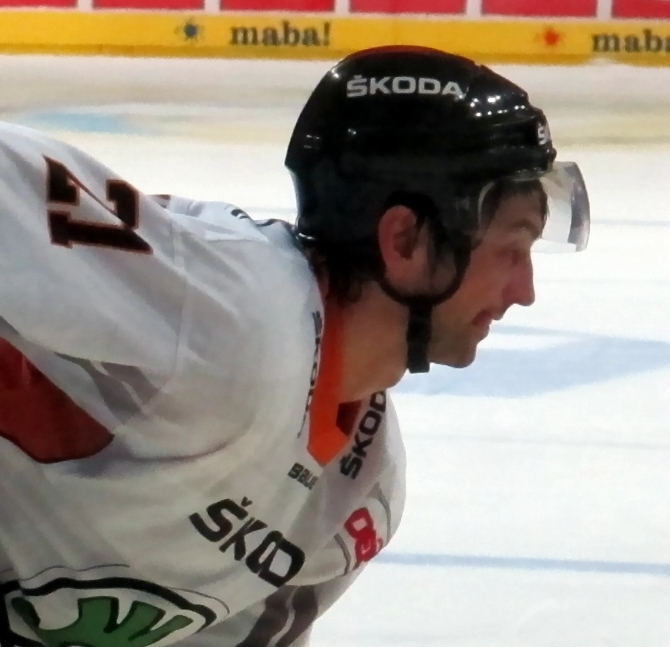
- Born: August 10, 1983 (age 41); Dachau, West Germany
- Height: 6 ft 0 in (183 cm)
- Weight: 187 lb (85 kg; 13 st 5 lb)
- Position: Left wing
- Shoots: Left
- Oberliga team Former teams: Hannover Scorpions; ERC Ingolstadt; Grizzlys Wolfsburg
- Playing career: 2005–present

Christoph Hoehenleitner (born August 10, 1983) is a German professional ice hockey player currently under contract with the Hannover Scorpions of the Oberliga. He previously played 12 seasons for the Grizzlys Wolfsburg in the Deutsche Eishockey Liga (DEL).

== Career statistics ==
			Regular season					Playoffs
Season	Team	League	GP	G	A	Pts	PIM	GP	G	A	Pts	PIM
2000–01	Erding Jets	Germany2	33	0	1	1	0	—	—	—	—	—
2001–02	Erding Jets	Germany3	53	5	4	9	8	—	—	—	—	—
2002–03	Augsburger EV II	Germany3	34	7	6	13	26	—	—	—	—	—
2003–04	Eisbären Regensburg	Germany2	49	3	1	4	12	5	1	0	1	0
2004–05	Eisbären Regensburg	Germany2	52	12	17	29	20	8	1	1	2	12
2005–06	ERC Ingolstadt	DEL	52	2	4	6	16	7	1	0	1	14
2005–06	EHC München	Germany2	2	0	0	0	2	—	—	—	—	—
2006–07	ERC Ingolstadt	DEL	52	3	6	9	8	6	0	0	0	2
2007–08	Grizzly Adams Wolfsburg	DEL	43	14	11	25	22	—	—	—	—	—
2008–09	Grizzly Adams Wolfsburg	DEL	43	5	7	12	32	10	0	1	1	2
2009–10	Grizzly Adams Wolfsburg	DEL	55	6	14	20	8	7	0	0	0	8
2010–11	Grizzly Adams Wolfsburg	DEL	50	8	9	17	20	9	2	0	2	6
2011–12	Grizzly Adams Wolfsburg	DEL	52	6	11	17	20	4	0	0	0	6
2012–13	Grizzly Adams Wolfsburg	DEL	51	3	8	11	32	1	0	0	0	0
2013–14	Grizzly Adams Wolfsburg	DEL	48	4	13	17	18	11	0	3	3	4
2014–15	Grizzly Adams Wolfsburg	DEL	52	6	5	11	20	11	4	0	4	8
2015–16	Grizzlys Wolfsburg	DEL	40	3	7	10	41	15	3	3	6	2
2016–17	Grizzlys Wolfsburg	DEL	42	12	9	21	16	9	0	0	0	8
2017–18	Grizzlys Wolfsburg	DEL	52	8	14	22	12	7	3	3	6	25
2018–19	Grizzlys Wolfsburg	DEL	34	7	8	15	24	—	—	—	—	—
2019–20	Grizzlys Wolfsburg	DEL	40	2	6	8	18	—	—	—	—	—
2020–21	Hannover Scorpions	Germany3	13	2	3	5	14	—	—	—	—	—
DEL totals			706	89	132	221	307	97	13	10	23	85
