= André Rankel =

German ice hockey player

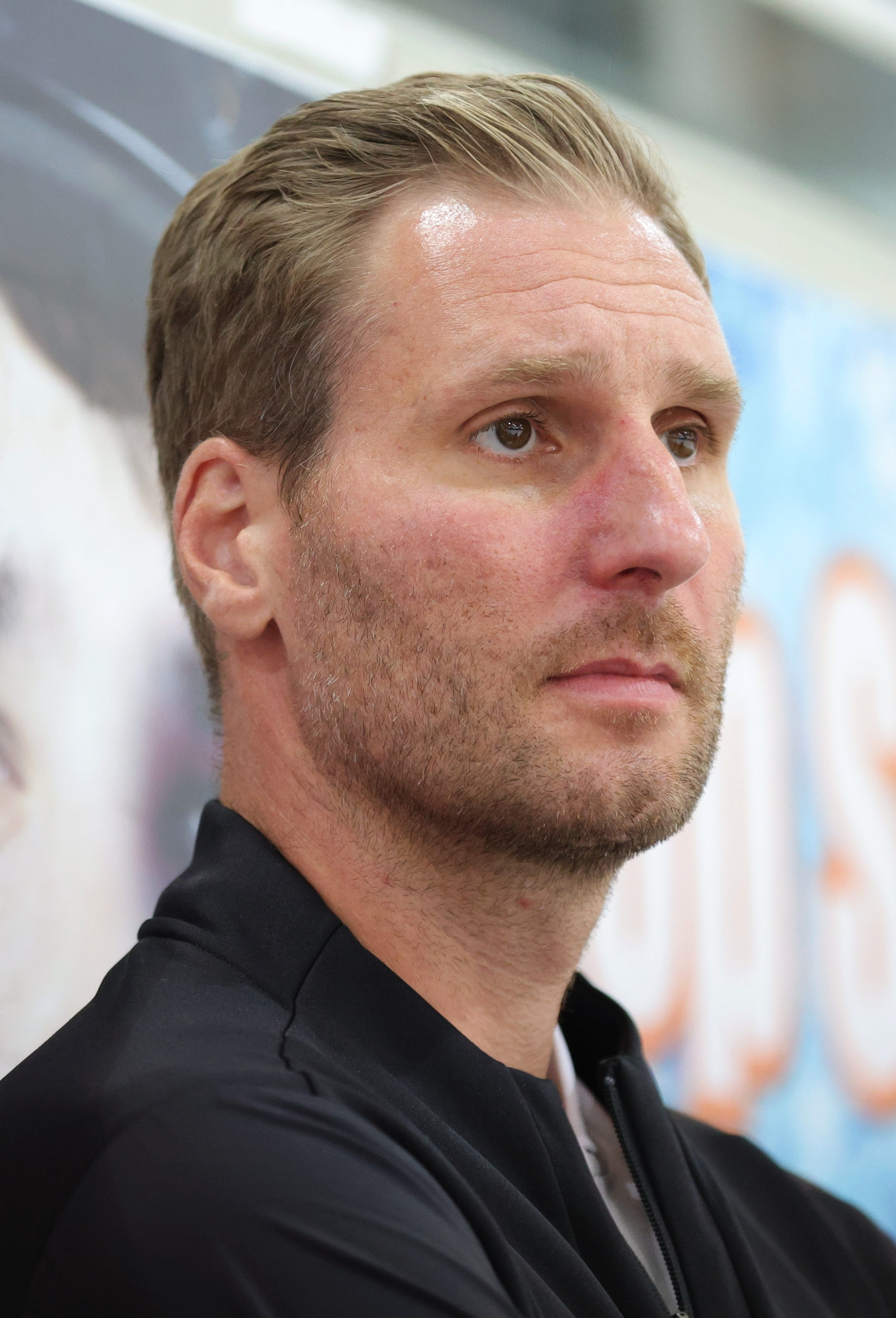
- Rankel in 2024
- Born: 27 August 1985 (age 40) West Berlin, FRG
- Height: 6 ft 1 in (185 cm)
- Weight: 209 lb (95 kg; 14 st 13 lb)
- Position: Left wing
- Shot: Left
- DEL team Former teams: Free Agent; Eisbären Berlin
- National team: Germany
- NHL draft: Undrafted
- Playing career: 2003–2020

André Rankel (born 27 August 1985 in West Berlin, West Germany) is a German professional ice hockey forward. He is currently an unrestricted free agent who most recently played for the Eisbären Berlin in the Deutsche Eishockey Liga (German Ice Hockey League). He began playing in the DEL in 2003 with Berlin.

Rankel has also played internationally for the German national team. He was selected to play for Germany's team at the 2010 Winter Olympics. He has previously represented Germany at the 2003 and 2004 IIHF World U18 Championships, the 2005 World Junior Championship, and the 2007, 2008, and 2009 Ice Hockey World Championships.

== Career statistics ==
=== Regular season and playoffs ===
			Regular season					Playoffs
Season	Team	League	GP	G	A	Pts	PIM	GP	G	A	Pts	PIM
2000–01	Berlin Capitals	DNL	32	13	17	30	45	—	—	—	—	—
2001–02	Berlin Capitals	DNL	34	31	28	59	48	—	—	—	—	—
2002–03	Berlin Capitals	DNL	24	25	19	44	72	—	—	—	—	—
2002–03	Berlin Capitals	GER.4	12	4	6	10	0	12	3	4	7	4
2003–04	Eisbären Berlin	DEL	48	4	3	7	40	8	0	0	0	2
2003–04	Eisbären Juniors Berlin	GER.4	5	3	8	11		8	4	1	5	20
2004–05	Eisbären Berlin	DEL	42	5	3	8	28	12	0	2	2	2
2004–05	Eisbären Juniors Berlin	GER.3	13	9	13	22	28	—	—	—	—	—
2005–06	Eisbären Berlin	DEL	39	5	7	12	32	11	1	1	2	2
2005–06	Eisbären Juniors Berlin	GER.3	9	4	0	4	10	—	—	—	—	—
2006–07	Eisbären Berlin	DEL	52	12	15	27	28	3	1	1	2	8
2007–08	Eisbären Berlin	DEL	18	6	7	13	36	14	5	2	7	30
2008–09	Eisbären Berlin	DEL	47	14	18	32	65	12	6	2	8	22
2009–10	Eisbären Berlin	DEL	54	25	22	47	62	5	1	2	3	6
2010–11	Eisbären Berlin	DEL	37	12	14	26	91	12	9	9	18	14
2011–12	Eisbären Berlin	DEL	38	11	18	29	56	6	2	4	6	41
2012–13	Eisbären Berlin	DEL	48	20	34	54	44	13	4	10	14	16
2013–14	Eisbären Berlin	DEL	30	17	14	31	22	3	1	0	1	0
2014–15	Eisbären Berlin	DEL	45	20	18	38	34	3	0	1	1	4
2015–16	Eisbären Berlin	DEL	48	17	13	30	18	7	2	1	3	6
2016–17	Eisbären Berlin	DEL	47	12	8	20	36	13	3	2	5	4
2017–18	Eisbären Berlin	DEL	34	11	8	19	28	18	5	5	10	2
2018–19	Eisbären Berlin	DEL	43	10	9	19	20	8	2	2	4	2
2019–20	Eisbären Berlin	DEL	47	4	13	17	14	—	—	—	—	—
DEL totals			717	205	224	429	654	148	42	44	86	161

=== International ===
Year	Team	Event	GP	G	A	Pts	PIM
2002	Germany	U17		1	1	2
2003	Germany	WJC18 D1	5	1	0	1	2
2004	Germany	WJC D1	5	2	1	3	0
2005	Germany	WJC	6	0	1	1	6
2007	Germany	WC	6	0	0	0	4
2008	Germany	WC	2	0	0	0	2
2009	Germany	OGQ	3	0	1	1	6
2009	Germany	WC	3	0	0	0	2
2010	Germany	OG	4	0	1	1	0
2010	Germany	WC	9	0	0	0	0
2011	Germany	WC	7	1	2	3	2
2012	Germany	WC	3	0	0	0	0
2013	Germany	OGQ	3	0	1	1	0
2013	Germany	WC	6	0	1	1	0
Junior totals			16	3	2	5	8
Senior totals			46	1	6	7	16
