= Niklas Treutle =

German ice hockey player

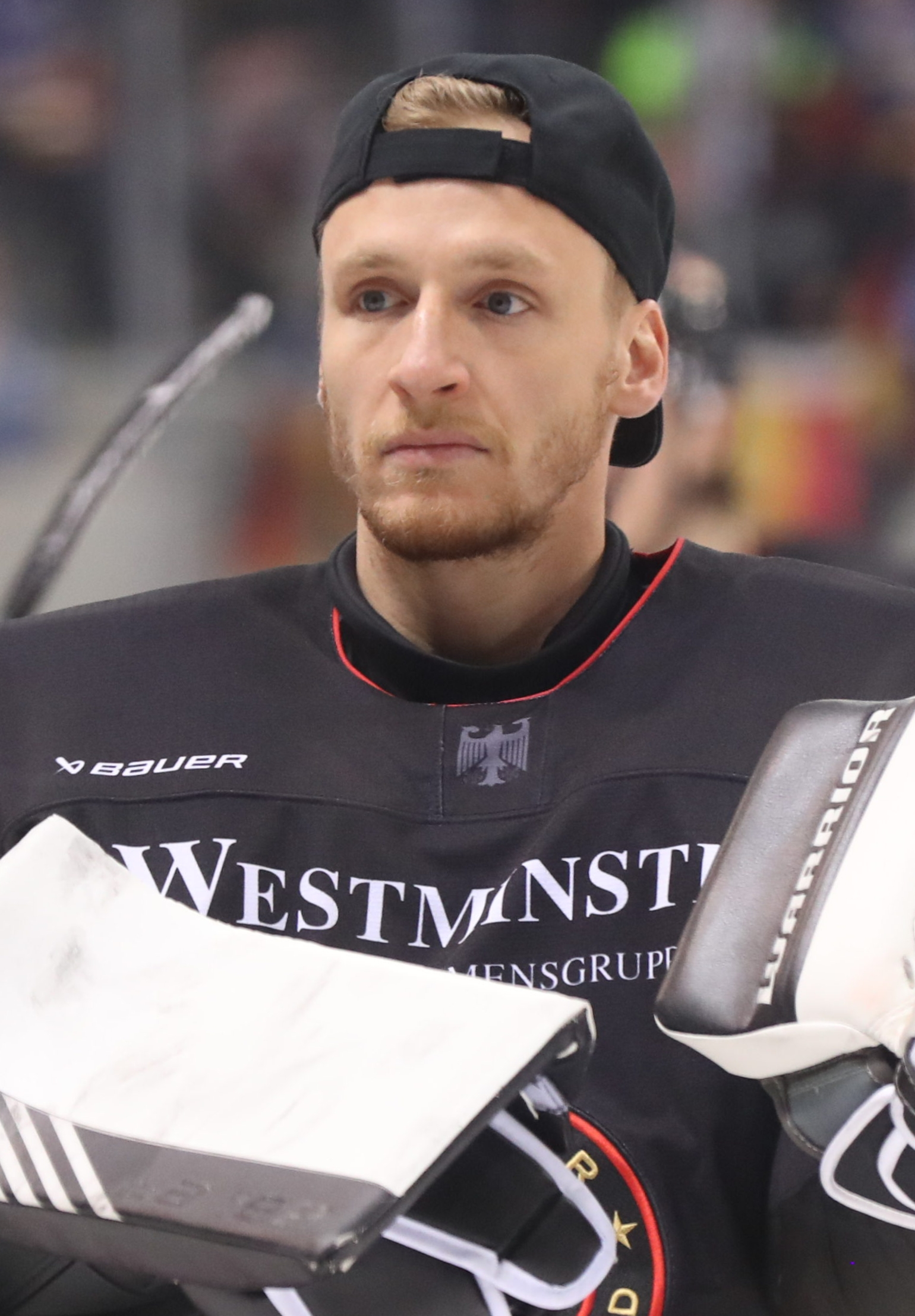
- Niklas Treutle, April 2022
- Born: 29 April 1991 (age 35) Nuremberg, Germany
- Height: 6 ft 2 in (188 cm)
- Weight: 185 lb (84 kg; 13 st 3 lb)
- Position: Goaltender
- Catches: Left
- DEL team Former teams: Nürnberg Ice Tigers; Hamburg Freezers; EHC München; Arizona Coyotes; KooKoo; Krefeld Pinguine
- National team: Germany
- NHL draft: Undrafted
- Playing career: 2009–present

Niklas Treutle (born 29 April 1991) is a German professional ice hockey goaltender currently playing for the Nürnberg Ice Tigers in the German top-flight DEL. In the 2015–16 season, he played within the Arizona Coyotes organization of the National Hockey League (NHL).

== Playing career ==
Undrafted, Treutle formerly played in his native country in the Deutsche Eishockey Liga (DEL) with the Nürnberg Ice Tigers, Hamburg Freezers and EHC München.

After a career best 2014–15 season in the DEL with München, Treutle attracted the attention of the NHL and was signed to a one-year entry-level contract with the Arizona Coyotes on 30 July 2015. He made two NHL appearances for the Coyotes and mostly played for their AHL affiliate Springfield Falcons during his single year in North America.

Following the conclusion of the 2015–16 campaign, Treutle moved back to Europe and joined KooKoo of the Finnish top-flight Liiga on a try-out contract. He saw the ice in four Liiga contests at the beginning of the 2016–17 season, before returning to his native Germany in October 2016, where he signed with DEL outfit Krefeld Pinguine.

In April 2017, Treutle signed to return to his hometown team Nürnberg Ice Tigers.

== International play ==
Treutle represented Germany at the 2018 IIHF World Championship in Denmark.

== Career statistics ==
=== Regular season and playoffs ===
			Regular season									Playoffs
Season	Team	League	GP	W	L	T/OT	MIN	GA	SO	GAA	SV%	GP	W	L	MIN	GA	SO	GAA	SV%
2008–09	Nürnberg Ice Tigers	DEL	1	0	0	0	7	0	0	0.00	—	—	—	—	—	—	—	—	—
2009–10	Thomas Sabo Ice Tigers	DEL	1	0	0	0	25	1	0	2.34	.923	—	—	—	—	—	—	—	—
2009–10	Deggendorf Fire	GER-2	31	12	19	0	1771	102	1	3.46	—	—	—	—	—	—	—	—	—
2010–11	Hamburg Freezers	DEL	10	4	5	0	538	24	1	2.67	.908	—	—	—	—	—	—	—	—
2010–11	Eispiraten Crimmitschau	GER-2	10	2	8	0	590	35	0	3.56	—	—	—	—	—	—	—	—	—
2011–12	Hamburg Freezers	DEL	12	6	4	0	644	29	1	2.70	.923	1	0	0	20	3	0	9.00	.750
2012–13	Hamburg Freezers	DEL	18	9	8	0	1040	45	1	2.59	.917	6	2	4	374	22	0	3.53	.891
2013–14	Hamburg Freezers	DEL	11	3	8	0	641	35	0	3.28	.892	—	—	—	—	—	—	—	—
2013–14	EHC München	DEL	8	3	4	0	419	19	0	2.72	.928	—	—	—	—	—	—	—	—
2013–14	SC Riessersee	DEL2	6	4	2	0	340	14	1	2.47	.929	—	—	—	—	—	—	—	—
2014–15	EHC München	DEL	30	20	10	0	1744	60	0	2.06	.923	—	—	—	—	—	—	—	—
2014–15	SC Riessersee	DEL2	3	3	0	0	180	4	1	1.33	.945	—	—	—	—	—	—	—	—
2015–16	Springfield Falcons	AHL	39	12	19	5	2227	113	2	3.04	.905	—	—	—	—	—	—	—	—
2015–16	Arizona Coyotes	NHL	2	0	1	0	49	5	0	6.04	.750	—	—	—	—	—	—	—	—
2016–17	KooKoo	Liiga	4	1	2	1	245	16	0	3.92	.860	—	—	—	—	—	—	—	—
2016–17	Krefeld Pinguine	DEL	23	7	15	0	1268	69	0	3.27	.905	—	—	—	—	—	—	—	—
2017–18	Thomas Sabo Ice Tigers	DEL	25	15	7	0	1368	43	1	1.89	.944	12	6	6	761	32	0	2.52	.929
2018–19	Thomas Sabo Ice Tigers	DEL	35	18	16	0	2085	99	1	2.85	.911	7	3	4	465	27	0	3.00	.900
2019–20	Thomas Sabo Ice Tigers	DEL	47	28	19	0	2816	134	3	2.86	.910	—	—	—	—	—	—	—	—
2020–21	Nürnberg Ice Tigers	DEL	32	10	22	0	1901	109	0	3.44	.898	—	—	—	—	—	—	—	—
2020–21	Ravensburg Towerstars	DEL2	6	4	2	0	350	17	0	2.91	.918	—	—	—	—	—	—	—	—
2021–22	Nürnberg Ice Tigers	DEL	44	23	19	0	2587	138	1	3.20	.901	3	1	2	184	11	0	3.59	.847
2022–23	Nürnberg Ice Tigers	DEL	43	22	20	0	2482	131	1	3.17	.899	2	0	2	116	5	0	2.58	.884
2023–24	Nürnberg Ice Tigers	DEL	28	11	17	0	1628	85	0	3.13	.888	2	0	2	117	6	0	3.08	.909
2024–25	Nürnberg Ice Tigers	DEL	19	8	9	0	1088	58	0	3.20	.890	1	0	1	40	2	0	3.00	.905
DEL totals			387	187	183	0	22,284	1,079	10	2.91	.908	34	12	21	2,077	108	0	3.12	.906
NHL totals			2	0	1	0	49	5	0	6.04	.750	—	—	—	—	—	—	—	—

=== International ===
Year	Team	Event	Result	GP	W	L	T	MIN	GA	SO	GAA	SV%
2011	Germany	WJC	10th	4	0	3	1	186	7	0	2.26	.930
2018	Germany	WC	11th	4	1	3	0	239	10	0	2.52	.919
2019	Germany	WC	6th	2	1	1	0	90	8	0	5.34	.869
Junior totals				4	0	3	1	186	7	0	2.26	.930
Senior totals				6	2	4	0	329	18	0	3.29	.903
