= Florian Kettemer =

German ice hockey player

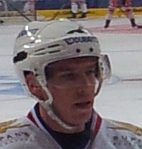
- Born: June 10, 1986 (age 38); Kaufbeuren, Germany
- Height: 6 ft 0 in (183 cm)
- Weight: 176 lb (80 kg; 12 st 8 lb)
- Position: Defence
- Shoots: Left
- DEL team Former teams: Free Agent; EHC München; Augsburger Panther; Adler Mannheim; Eisbären Berlin
- NHL draft: Undrafted
- Playing career: 2004–present

Florian Kettemer (born June 10, 1986) is a German professional ice hockey defenceman who is currently an unrestricted free agent. He most recently played for Eisbären Berlin of the Deutsche Eishockey Liga (DEL). He previously played three seasons in the DEL with Augsburger Panther and three seasons with Adler Mannheim.

On April 1, 2014, Kettemer signed a one-year contract as a free agent with his third DEL club, EHC München.

After four seasons in Munich and having claimed the previous three championships, Kettemer left as a free agent to sign an initial four-month contract with Eisbären Berlin on August 1, 2018.

== Career statistics ==
=== Regular season and playoffs ===
			Regular season					Playoffs
Season	Team	League	GP	G	A	Pts	PIM	GP	G	A	Pts	PIM
2004–05	ESV Kaufbeuren	2.GBun	11	2	2	4	6	10	0	0	0	6
2005–06	ESV Kaufbeuren	2.GBun	43	2	6	8	70	8	0	1	1	4
2006–07	ESV Kaufbeuren	2.GBun	49	2	5	7	36	7	0	0	0	4
2007–08	EHC München	2.GBun	45	2	6	8	22	—	—	—	—	—
2008–09	EHC München	2.GBun	43	1	8	9	38	13	3	5	8	4
2008–09	Augsburger Panther	DEL	14	1	1	2	31	—	—	—	—	—
2009–10	Augsburger Panther	DEL	49	3	5	8	24	14	0	0	0	4
2010–11	Augsburger Panther	DEL	51	1	3	4	32	—	—	—	—	—
2011–12	Adler Mannheim	DEL	52	0	5	5	20	14	0	0	0	2
2012–13	Adler Mannheim	DEL	30	1	3	4	22	6	1	1	2	2
2013–14	Adler Mannheim	DEL	43	1	5	6	18	4	0	0	0	0
2014–15	EHC München	DEL	50	4	15	19	55	4	0	0	0	8
2015–16	EHC München	DEL	42	3	8	11	20	14	0	3	3	14
2016–17	EHC München	DEL	29	0	7	7	16	10	0	1	1	6
2017–18	EHC München	DEL	49	1	9	10	14	9	1	3	4	6
2018–19	Eisbären Berlin	DEL	37	10	9	19	24	8	0	1	1	6
2019–20	Eisbären Berlin	DEL	51	1	13	14	14	—	—	—	—	—
DEL totals			497	26	83	109	290	83	2	9	11	48

=== International ===
Year	Team	Event	GP	G	A	Pts	PIM
2006	Germany	WJC-D1	5	0	0	0	4
Junior totals			5	0	0	0	4
