= Stephen Dixon (ice hockey) =

Canadian ice hockey player (born 1985)

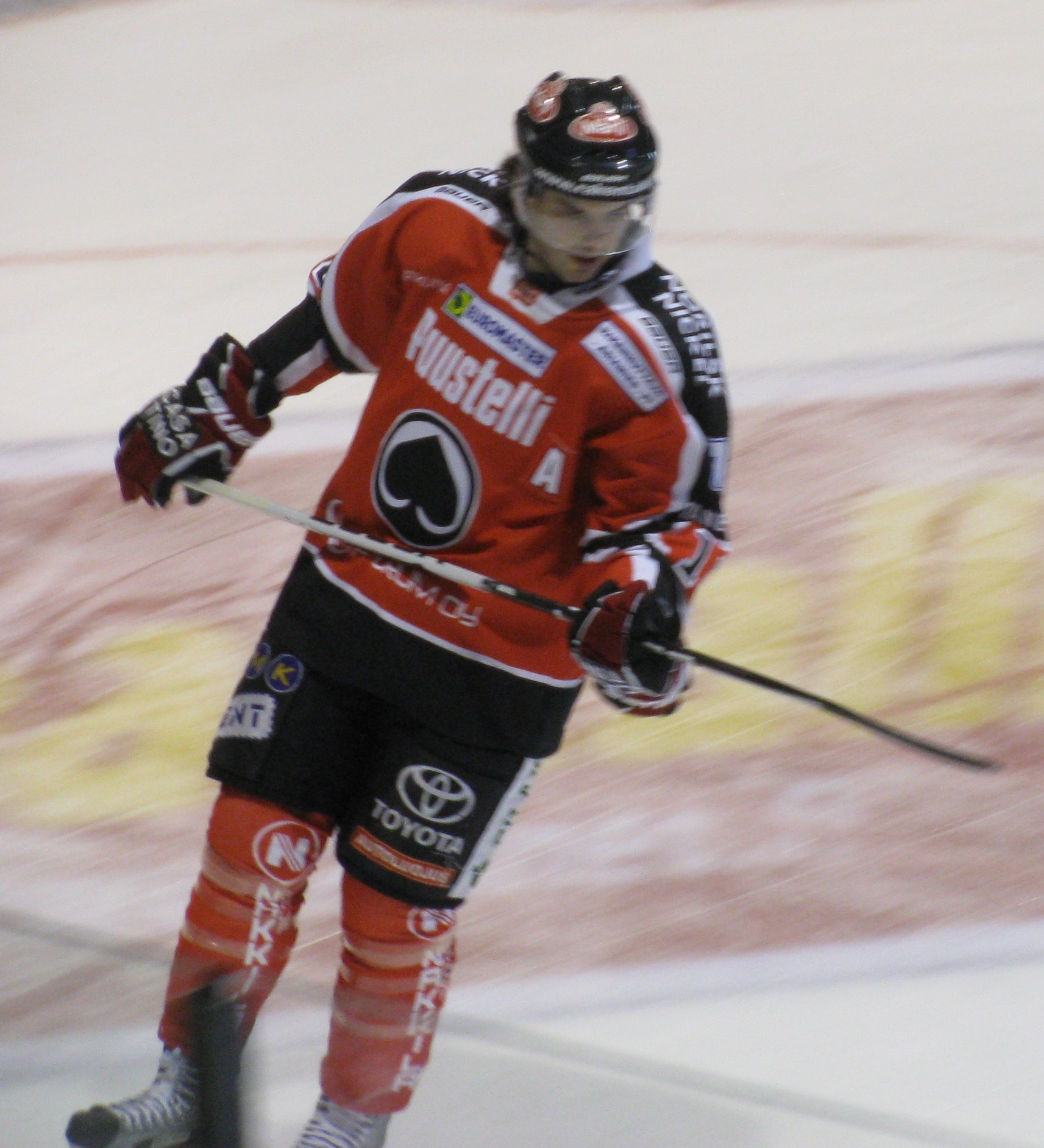
- Dixon with the Porin Ässät
- Born: September 7, 1985 (age 40) Halifax, Nova Scotia, Canada
- Height: 6 ft 0 in (183 cm)
- Weight: 192 lb (87 kg; 13 st 10 lb)
- Position: Centre
- Shot: Left
- Played for: Tappara; Luleå HF; HC Yugra; Lokomotiv Yaroslav; Brynäs IF; Amur Khabarovsk; Ässät; Grizzlys Wolfsburg; Cardiff Devils; Glasgow Clan
- NHL draft: 229th overall, 2003; Pittsburgh Penguins
- Playing career: 2005–2023

Stephen Dixon (born September 7, 1985) is a retired Canadian professional ice hockey centre who last played for Glasgow Clan of the EIHL.

== Playing career ==
A first round pick for Cape Breton Screaming Eagles (QMJHL) in the 2001 Midget Draft, the Halifax native played his entire junior career with Cape Breton, despite being traded to the Val-d'Or Foreurs before the start of the 2005 season.

Dixon was drafted in the seventh round, 229th overall, by the Pittsburgh Penguins in the 2003 NHL entry draft. He played all 80 games with the Wilkes-Barre Scranton penguins for the 2005–2006 and 2006–2007 season. The Penguins traded him to the Anaheim Ducks on June 23, 2007, in exchange for Tim Brent. He was assigned to the Portland Pirates. Dixon played in the KHL-team Amur Khabarovsk in the season 2010–2011. On August 29, 2011, Dixon moved for the second consecutive season within Europe to sign a one-year contract with the Finnish club, Ässät of the SM-liiga.

During the 2012–13 season, Dixon transferred at the transfer deadline from Ässät to return to the KHL with Lokomotiv Yaroslavl on January 31, 2013.

Dixon was a member of the gold medal-winning Canadian team at the 2005 World Junior Ice Hockey Championships.

He has since gone on to play for HC Yugra (KHL), Luleå HF (SHL), Tappara (Liiga), Grizzlys Wolfsburg (DEL) and Cardiff Devils (EIHL).

In June 2022, Dixon left Cardiff for fellow Elite League side Glasgow Clan. He was named player-assistant coach, before assuming the interim head coach position after the departure of Clan coach Malcolm Cameron in October 2022. Dixon retired from hockey in July 2023.

== Career statistics ==
=== Regular season and playoffs ===
			Regular season					Playoffs
Season	Team	League	GP	G	A	Pts	PIM	GP	G	A	Pts	PIM
2001–02	Cape Breton Screaming Eagles	QMJHL	64	16	15	31	12	16	3	5	8	12
2002–03	Cape Breton Screaming Eagles	QMJHL	72	28	42	70	54	4	0	0	0	6
2003–04	Cape Breton Screaming Eagles	QMJHL	55	22	50	72	33	5	1	0	1	0
2004–05	Cape Breton Screaming Eagles	QMJHL	45	17	34	51	40	—	—	—	—	—
2005–06	Wilkes–Barre/Scranton Penguins	AHL	80	12	17	29	45	11	0	1	1	4
2006–07	Wilkes–Barre/Scranton Penguins	AHL	80	17	24	41	43	11	2	3	5	6
2007–08	Portland Pirates	AHL	80	17	28	45	43	18	6	4	10	10
2008–09	Brynäs IF	SEL	53	8	19	27	32	4	0	0	0	2
2009–10	Brynäs IF	SEL	53	20	15	35	55	5	0	0	0	2
2010–11	Amur Khabarovsk	KHL	47	7	10	17	8	—	—	—	—	—
2011–12	Ässät	SM-l	60	14	39	53	59	4	1	1	2	27
2012–13	Ässät	SM-l	44	9	35	44	51	—	—	—	—	—
2012–13	Lokomotiv Yaroslavl	KHL	3	0	2	2	0	6	0	4	4	6
2013–14	Lokomotiv Yaroslavl	KHL	9	1	0	1	2	—	—	—	—	—
2013–14	HC Yugra	KHL	42	3	13	16	20	—	—	—	—	—
2014–15	Luleå HF	SHL	15	2	2	4	33	—	—	—	—	—
2014–15	Tappara	Liiga	25	2	11	13	4	20	1	4	5	18
2015–16	Tappara	Liiga	59	6	11	17	28	15	2	0	2	52
2016–17	Grizzlys Wolfsburg	DEL	22	5	6	11	8	10	1	0	1	6
2017–18	Grizzlys Wolfsburg	DEL	52	5	14	19	22	7	3	4	7	31
2018–19	Cardiff Devils	EIHL	60	21	24	45	28	4	1	2	3	0
2019–20	Cardiff Devils	EIHL	44	14	12	26	53	—	—	—	—	—
2021–22	Cardiff Devils	EIHL	50	15	21	36	31	4	1	1	2	6
2022–23	Glasgow Clan	EIHL	48	6	16	22	18	2	0	2	2	0
AHL totals			240	46	69	115	131	40	8	8	16	20
Liiga (SM-l) totals			188	31	96	127	142	39	4	5	9	97
SEL totals			121	30	36	66	120	9	0	0	0	4
KHL totals			101	11	25	36	30	6	0	4	4	6

Medal record

Ice hockey

Representing Canada

World Junior Championships
Gold medal – first place	2005 North Dakota	
Silver medal – second place	2004 Helsinki	

World Junior U18 Championships
Gold medal – first place	2003 Yaroslavl	

=== International ===
Year	Team	Event	GP	G	A	Pts	PIM
2002	Canada Atlantic	U17	5	1	1	2	16
2002	Canada	U18	5	2	4	6	12
2003	Canada	WJC18	7	3	3	6	4
2004	Canada	WJC	6	0	1	1	0
2005	Canada	WJC	6	0	1	1	2
Junior totals			29	6	10	16	34
