= Jamie MacQueen =

Canadian ice hockey player

- Born: August 2, 1988 (age 38) London, Ontario, Canada
- Height: 6 ft 1 in (185 cm)
- Weight: 185 lb (84 kg; 13 st 3 lb)
- Position: Forward
- Shot: Left
- Played for: Lake Erie Monsters; Norfolk Admirals; St. John's IceCaps; Iowa Wild; Eispiraten Crimmitschau; Kassel Huskies; Eisbären Berlin; Schwenninger Wild Wings; Iserlohn Roosters; Schwenninger Wild Wings; Kassel Huskies
- NHL draft: Undrafted
- Playing career: 2012–2022

Jamie MacQueen (born August 2, 1988) is a retired Canadian professional ice hockey forward.

== Playing career ==
Born in London, Ontario, MacQueen spent the early stages of his playing career in the WOHL and OPJHL. In 2008, MacQueen enrolled at Bemidji State University in Minnesota. As a freshman, he advanced to the Frozen Four with the Beavers.

Coming out of college in 2012, he signed a professional contract with the Lake Erie Monsters, the American Hockey League (AHL) affiliate of the Colorado Avalanche. He also spent time with the Denver Cutthroats, the Central Hockey League affiliate of the Avalanche. He scored his first AHL goal for the Monsters in the 2012–13 season on December, 22 against the Houston Aeros.

MacQueen started the 2013-14 season with the Utah Grizzlies, the ECHL affiliate of the Anaheim Ducks He opened the season with five goals in the first two games for the Grizzlies, which earned him ECHL Player of the Week honors, and later inked a Professional Try Out (PTO) contract with the Norfolk Admirals, then the AHL-affiliate of the Ducks. In this season MacQueen signed furthermore PTOs with the AHL teams St. John's IceCaps and Iowa Wild.

MacQueen signed with Eispiraten Crimmitschau, a member of the second German division DEL2, for the 2014–15 season. Tallying 61 points (30 goals, 31 assists) in 43 games, he made an outstanding impression in his first year in Germany.

He signed for fellow DEL2 club Kassel Huskies for the 2015–16 campaign, excelling as the league's second-leading scorer and helping the Huskies win the 2015-16 DEL2 championship title.

After winning the DEL2 title, he moved to Germany's top-tier league Deutsche Eishockey Liga for the 2016–17 season, signing a one-year contract with the Eisbären Berlin.

Following the 2018–19 season, his third in Berlin, having contributed with 37 points in 46 regular season games, MacQueen left the club, continuing in the DEL in agreeing to a two-year contract with Schwenninger Wild Wings on June 16, 2019. Afterwards he had a stint at fellow DEL side Iserlohn Roosters, then went back to Schwenningen, before returning to DEL2 outfit Kassel Huskies in 2021. MacQueen announced his retirement in April 2022. Throughout his career in Germany, he saw action in 264 DEL games and 163 games of the German second-tier league DEL2.

== Awards and honours ==
Award	Year
ECHL Player of the Week (Oct. 18-20)	2012
DEL2-Champion with Kassel Huskies	2016
Most goals in DEL2 and Topscorer in DEL2 Play-offs	2016
