= Sebastian Uvira =

German ice hockey player

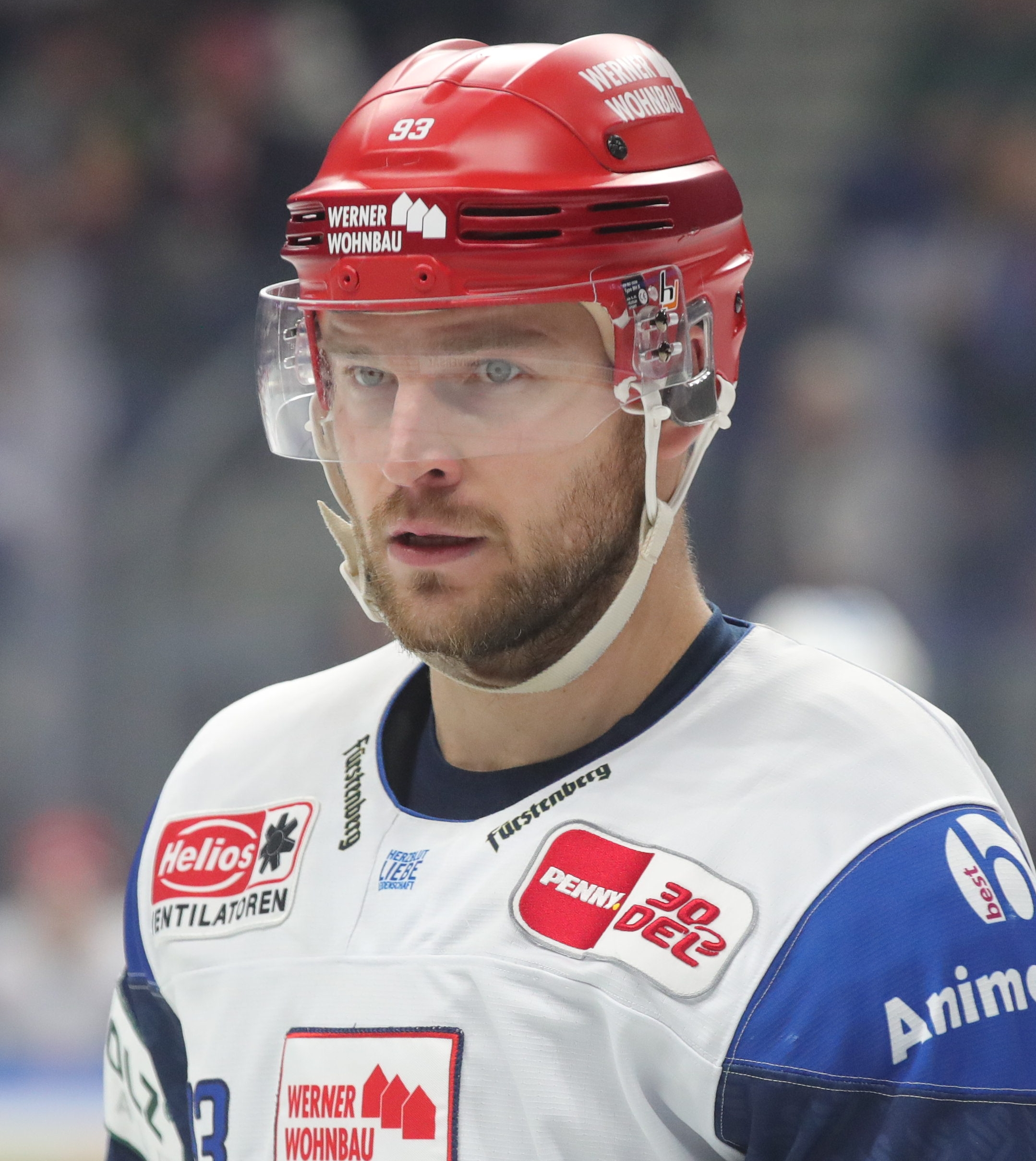
- Uvira with the Schwenninger Wild Wings in 2023
- Born: 26 January 1993 (age 33) Freiburg, Germany
- Height: 6 ft 2 in (188 cm)
- Weight: 220 lb (100 kg; 15 st 10 lb)
- Position: Left wing
- Shoots: Left
- DEL team Former teams: Schwenninger Wild Wings; Augsburger Panther; Kölner Haie
- National team: Germany
- NHL draft: Undrafted
- Playing career: 2011–present

Sebastian Uvira (born 26 January 1993 in Freiburg) is a German professional ice hockey winger. He currently plays for Schwenninger Wild Wings in the Deutsche Eishockey Liga (DEL).

== Playing career ==
During the 2014–15 season, Uvira was traded from Augsburger Panther to Kölner Haie on 26 November 2014. He represented Germany at the 2018 IIHF World Championship.

After eight seasons with Kölner Haie, Uvira left as a free agent and was signed to a three-year contract in joining his third DEL club, Schwenninger Wild Wings, on 18 July 2022.

== Personal life ==
His father is Eduard Uvíra, a former ice hockey player for the Czechoslovakia men's national ice hockey team which won a silver medal at the 1984 Winter Olympics.

== Career statistics ==
=== Regular season and playoffs ===
			Regular season					Playoffs
Season	Team	League	GP	G	A	Pts	PIM	GP	G	A	Pts	PIM
2008–09	Eisbären Juniors Berlin	DNL	8	2	3	5	10	4	1	1	2	2
2009–10	Eisbären Juniors Berlin	DNL	30	9	16	25	40	7	2	2	4	2
2009–10	FASS Berlin	4.GBun	5	3	0	3	4	—	—	—	—	—
2010–11	EV Landshut	DNL	29	13	19	32	102	9	6	3	9	12
2010–11	Landshut Cannibals	2.GBun	23	1	1	2	12	5	2	0	2	10
2011–12	Oshawa Generals	OHL	58	13	9	22	63	—	—	—	—	—
2012–13	Oshawa Generals	OHL	23	3	3	6	17	—	—	—	—	—
2012–13	Plymouth Whalers	OHL	26	7	14	21	31	15	3	5	8	25
2013–14	Augsburger Panther	DEL	49	8	5	13	113	—	—	—	—	—
2014–15	Augsburger Panther	DEL	19	3	3	6	18	—	—	—	—	—
2014–15	Kölner Haie	DEL	29	3	8	11	16	—	—	—	—	—
2015–16	Kölner Haie	DEL	38	4	8	12	44	—	—	—	—	—
2016–17	Kölner Haie	DEL	38	8	5	13	42	7	0	0	0	0
2017–18	Kölner Haie	DEL	50	9	12	21	58	6	4	0	4	2
2018–19	Kölner Haie	DEL	52	17	13	30	44	3	1	0	1	2
2019–20	Kölner Haie	DEL	46	6	4	10	24	—	—	—	—	—
2020–21	Kölner Haie	DEL	20	0	3	3	34	—	—	—	—	—
2021–22	Kölner Haie	DEL	48	11	10	21	48	—	—	—	—	—
2022–23	Schwenninger Wild Wings	DEL	56	9	9	18	20	—	—	—	—	—
2023–24	Schwenninger Wild Wings	DEL	35	10	8	18	16	7	0	1	1	2
2024–25	Schwenninger Wild Wings	DEL	51	8	20	28	35	3	0	2	2	2
DEL totals			531	96	108	204	512	26	5	3	8	8

=== International ===
Year	Team	Event	Result	GP	G	A	Pts	PIM
2011	Germany	U18	6th	6	1	1	2	16
2012	Germany	WJC-D1	11th	5	1	0	1	8
2013	Germany	WJC	9th	6	1	1	2	6
2018	Germany	WC	11th	5	0	0	0	2
Junior totals				17	3	2	5	30
Senior totals				5	0	0	0	2
