= Martin Buchwieser =

German professional ice hockey forward

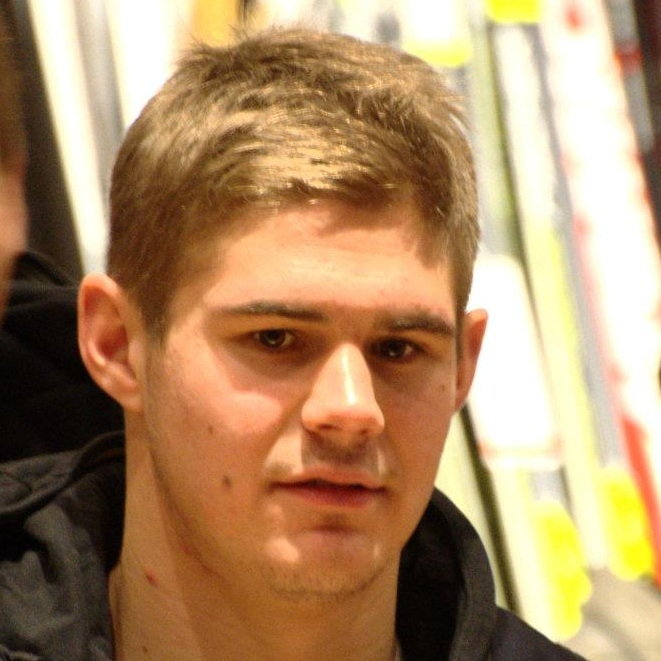
- Born: 28 May 1989 (age 37) Garmisch-Partenkirchen, Germany
- Height: 5 ft 11 in (180 cm)
- Weight: 183 lb (83 kg; 13 st 1 lb)
- Position: Forward
- Shoots: Left
- DEL2 team Former teams: Löwen Frankfurt; EHC München; Augsburger Panther; Adler Mannheim; ERC Ingolstadt; Eisbären Berlin
- Playing career: 2006–present

Martin Buchwieser (born 28 May 1989) is a German professional ice hockey forward who is signed with Löwen Frankfurt, a member of the DEL2.

== Playing career ==
Buchwieser came through the youth ranks of SC Riessersee, before joining EHC München in 2008. He earned promotion to Germany's top-flight DEL with the team in 2010 and during that particular season already logged his first DEL minutes with Augsburger Panther.

After his third season with EHC München, his first as captain in 2012–13, Buchwieser was released as a free agent and signed by Adler Mannheim on a two-year contract on 12 April 2013. He won the 2015 German championship with Mannheim and during the offseason was traded to fellow DEL side Hamburg Freezers in May 2016. Later that month, the Freezers folded, Buchwieser became a free agent and was picked up by another DEL team, ERC Ingolstadt, a couple of days later.
