= Olver =

Olver is a surname. Those bearing it include:

- Carrie Olver (born 1967), Canadian TV personality
- Darin Olver (born 1985), Canadian ice hockey player
- Dick Olver (born 1947), British business manager
- Fergie Olver, Canadian gameshow host and sports broadcaster.
- Frank W. J. Olver (1924–2013) American mathematician
- Ian Olver (born 1953), Australian medical oncologist, cancer researcher and bio-ethicist
- Jeff Olver (born 1960), Australian footballer
- John Olver (1936–2023), American politician
- John Olver (ice hockey) (born 1958), Canadian ice hockey player and coach
- John Olver (rugby union) (born 1961), English former international rugby player
- Mark Olver (ice hockey) (born 1988), Canadian professional ice hockey player
- Peter Olver (pilot) (1917–2013), British World War II flying ace
- Peter J. Olver (born 1952), American professor of mathematics
- Sam Olver (born 1994), English rugby union player

== See also ==
- Olver (The Wheel of Time), fictional character
