= Tim Miller (ice hockey) =

American-German ice hockey player (born 1987)

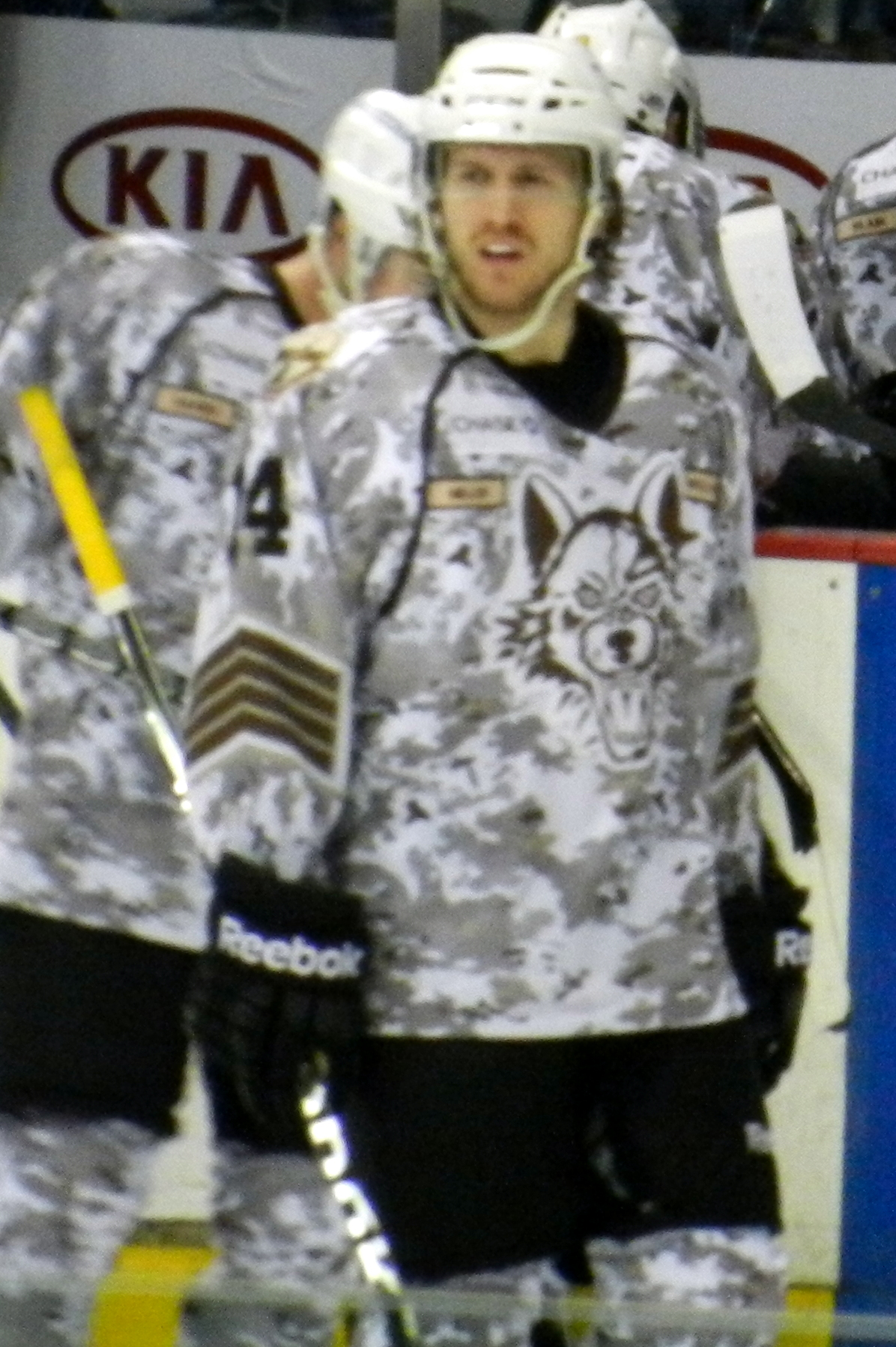
- Miller playing for the Chicago Wolves during a military appreciation night in 2013
- Born: March 6, 1987 (age 38) Davisburg, Michigan, U.S.
- Height: 6 ft 1 in (185 cm)
- Weight: 190 lb (86 kg; 13 st 8 lb)
- Position: Forward
- Shoots: Right
- DEL2 team Former teams: Heilbronner Falken; Syracuse Crunch; Chicago Wolves; Springfield Falcons; San Antonio Rampage; Abbotsford Heat; Straubing Tigers; Krefeld Pinguine
- NHL draft: Undrafted
- Playing career: 2009–present

Tim Miller (born March 6, 1987) is an American-German professional ice hockey forward who is currently playing for Heilbronner Falken in the DEL2.

== Playing career ==
In the 2013–14 season, Miller endured a journeyman season. After 4 games with the Wolves he was moved and appeared in 21 games with the Springfield Falcons, posting 1 goal and 9 assists before he was traded to fellow AHL club, the San Antonio Rampage, in exchange for Denny Urban on February 20, 2014. Miller went scoreless in 3 games with the Rampage before he moved to the Abbotsford Heat for the remainder of the season.

A free agent into the following 2014–15 season, Miller signed his first contract abroad on a two-year contract with German club, the Fischtown Pinguins of the DEL2 on November 10, 2014. When his contract was up, he moved to the Straubing Tigers of the German top-tier Deutsche Eishockey Liga (DEL), signing in May 2016. In late October 2017, he signed a deal with German DEL2 side Dresdner Eislöwen before moving to Krefeld Pinguine of the DEL on November 10, 2017.

== Career statistics ==
			Regular season					Playoffs
Season	Team	League	GP	G	A	Pts	PIM	GP	G	A	Pts	PIM
2003–04	River City Lancers	USHL	58	7	10	17	95	3	0	0	0	6
2004–05	Omaha Lancers	USHL	59	17	21	38	128	5	0	3	3	8
2005–06	University of Michigan	CCHA	41	4	11	15	54	—	—	—	—	—
2006–07	University of Michigan	CCHA	41	7	17	24	57	—	—	—	—	—
2007–08	University of Michigan	CCHA	43	4	13	17	26	—	—	—	—	—
2008–09	University of Michigan	CCHA	41	10	11	21	59	—	—	—	—	—
2008–09	Syracuse Crunch	AHL	1	1	0	1	0	—	—	—	—	—
2009–10	Gwinnett Gladiators	ECHL	44	15	20	35	103	—	—	—	—	—
2009–10	Syracuse Crunch	AHL	21	1	1	2	18	—	—	—	—	—
2010–11	Gwinnett Gladiators	ECHL	46	20	16	36	102	—	—	—	—	—
2010–11	Chicago Wolves	AHL	33	11	9	20	12	—	—	—	—	—
2011–12	Chicago Wolves	AHL	75	19	19	38	61	5	2	0	2	0
2012–13	Chicago Wolves	AHL	56	2	4	6	73	—	—	—	—	—
2013–14	Chicago Wolves	AHL	4	0	0	0	7	—	—	—	—	—
2013–14	Springfield Falcons	AHL	21	1	9	10	32	—	—	—	—	—
2013–14	Evansville IceMen	ECHL	3	0	0	0	0	—	—	—	—	—
2013–14	San Antonio Rampage	AHL	3	0	0	0	0	—	—	—	—	—
2013–14	Abbotsford Heat	AHL	14	1	4	5	11	2	0	0	0	0
2014–15	Fischtown Pinguins	DEL2	24	2	10	12	107	13	7	5	12	18
2015–16	Fischtown Pinguins	DEL2	42	18	13	31	179	6	0	3	3	22
2016–17	Straubing Tigers	DEL	46	6	5	11	70	2	0	0	0	0
2017–18	Dresdner Eislöwen	DEL2	3	1	2	3	4	—	—	—	—	—
2017–18	Krefeld Pinguine	DEL	33	4	1	5	32	—	—	—	—	—
2018–19	Krefeld Pinguine	DEL	52	3	11	14	68	—	—	—	—	—
AHL totals			229	36	47	83	214	7	2	0	2	0

== Awards and honours ==
Award	Year
College
CCHA All-Tournament Team	2008

Awards and achievements
Preceded by David Brown	CCHA Most Valuable Player in Tournament; 2008	Succeeded by Jordan Pearce
Preceded by Justin Abdelkader	CCHA Best Defensive Forward; 2008-09	Succeeded by Tommy Wingels
