= 2008 CCHA men's ice hockey tournament =

2008 CCHA Men's ice hockey tournament
- Dates: March 6–22, 2008
- Teams: 12
- Finals site: Joe Louis Arena; Detroit, Michigan
- Champions: Michigan (8th title)
- Winning coach: Red Berenson (8th title)
- MVP: Tim Miller (Michigan)
- CCHA Men's Ice Hockey Tournaments

The 2008 CCHA Men's Ice Hockey Tournament was the 37th CCHA Men's Ice Hockey Tournament. It was played between March 6 and March 22, 2008. Opening round and quarterfinal games were played at campus sites, while the semifinals, third place, and championship games were played at Joe Louis Arena in Detroit, Michigan. By winning the tournament, Michigan received the Central Collegiate Hockey Association's automatic bid to the 2008 NCAA Division I Men's Ice Hockey Tournament.

== Conference standings ==
Note: GP = Games played; W = Wins; L = Losses; T = Ties; PTS = Points; GF = Goals For; GA = Goals Against

2007–08 Central Collegiate Hockey Association standings
	Conference							Overall					
	GP	W	L	T	PTS	GF	GA	GP	W	L	T	GF	GA
#2 Michigan†*	28	20	4	4	44	107	62	43	33	6	4	170	89
#5 Miami	28	21	6	1	43	114	56	42	33	8	1	169	78
#7 Michigan State	28	19	6	3	41	92	58	42	25	12	5	135	98
#3 Notre Dame	28	15	9	4	34	74	57	47	27	16	4	136	100
Ferris State	28	12	12	4	28	77	72	39	18	16	5	109	98
Northern Michigan	28	12	13	3	27	76	78	44	20	20	4	116	120
Bowling Green	28	13	15	0	26	73	84	39	18	21	0	105	120
Nebraska–Omaha	28	11	13	4	26	87	99	40	17	19	4	125	142
Alaska	28	0^	28^	0^	20	61	80	35	0^	35^	0^	80	104
Lake Superior State	28	7	15	6	20	65	101	37	10	20	7	91	125
Ohio State	28	7	18	3	17	61	93	41	12	25	4	98	136
Western Michigan	28	4	22	2	10	53	100	38	8	27	3	82	126
Championship: Michigan † indicates conference regular season champion * indicates conference tournament champion Final rankings: USA Today/USA Hockey Magazine Top 15 Poll^ Alaska was retroactively required to forfeit all wins and ties due to player ineligibilities.

== Bracket ==
First round March 6–9
5	Ferris State	4*	6	—
12	Western Michigan	3	3	—
6	Northern Michigan	3	4	6
11	Ohio State	4	2	1
7	Bowling Green	4	1	4*
10	Lake Superior State	3	6	3
8	Nebraska-Omaha	4	3	2***
9	Alaska	3	5	1

Quarterfinals; March 14–16
1	Michigan	10	2	—
8	Nebraska-Omaha	1	1	—
2	Miami	4	4	—
7	Bowling Green	1	2	—
3	Michigan State	5	1	2
6	Northern Michigan	1	2	3*
4	Notre Dame	1	6	2
5	Ferris State	2	3	1

Semifinals; March 21
1	Michigan	6
6	Northern Michigan	4
2	Miami	2*
4	Notre Dame	1

Championship; March 22
1	Michigan	2
2	Miami	1
Third place
4	Notre Dame	1
6	Northern Michigan	2

Note: * denotes overtime period(s)

=== First round ===
==== (5) Ferris State vs. (12) Western Michigan ====
March 7	Ferris State	4 – 3	OT	Western Michigan	Ewigleben Arena	Recap
Cody Chupp - pp - 18:51		First period		13:38 - pp - Jeff Pierce
Blair Riley - pp - 08:48		Second period		15:37 - Cam Watson
Adam Miller - pp - 08:58		Third period		10:40 - Kevin O'Connor
Cody Chupp - 12:28		First overtime period		No scoring
Mitch O'Keefe ( 28 saves / 31 shots )		Goalie stats		Riley Gill ( 40 saves / 44 shots )

March 8	Ferris State	6 – 3	Western Michigan	Ewigleben Arena	Recap
Justin Lewandowski - pp - 12:49; Aaron Lewicki - 18:06		First period	05:44 - Nathan Ansell
Blair Riley - 02:10; Casey Haines - 06:45		Second period	No scoring
Brendan Connolly - 01:11; Brendan Connolly - en - 19:40		Third period	00:59 - Jeff Pierce; 04:00 - Travis Paeth
Pat Nagle ( 27 saves / 30 shots )		Goalie stats	Riley Gill ( 39 saves / 44 shots )

Ferris State won series 2–0

==== (6) Northern Michigan vs. (11) Ohio State ====
March 7	Northern Michigan	3 – 4	Ohio State	Berry Events Center	Recap
Jared Brown - pp - 15:39		First period	06:34 - Tommy Goebel; 18:39 - Patrick Schafer
No scoring		Second period	10:47 - Jason DeSantis; 13:54 - pp - Todd Rudasill
Matt Siddall - 16:07; T. J. Miller - 18:04		Third period	No scoring
Brian Stewart ( 14 saves / 18 shots )		Goalie stats	Joe Palmer ( 27 saves / 30 shots )

March 8	Northern Michigan	4 – 2	Ohio State	Berry Events Center	Recap
Nick Sirota - 03:00		First period	07:03 - Jason DeSantis
Phil Fox - 01:28; Mark Olver - pp - 19:58		Second period	No scoring
Nick Sirota - 06:18		Third period	19:44 - Kyle Reed
Brian Stewart ( 25 saves / 27 shots )		Goalie stats	Joe Palmer ( 23 saves / 27 shots )

March 9	Northern Michigan	6 – 1	Ohio State	Berry Events Center	Recap
Mark Olver - 19:04		First period	No scoring
Mark Olver - pp - 14:48		Second period	No scoring
Phil Fox - 01:24; Jared Brown - pp - 02:06; Matt Siddall - pp - 07:41; Billy Smith - en - 19:07		Third period	03:24 - Peter Boyd
Brian Stewart ( 35 saves / 36 shots )		Goalie stats	Joe Palmer ( 24 saves / 29 shots )

Northern Michigan won series 2–1

==== (7) Bowling Green vs. (10) Lake Superior State ====
March 7	Bowling Green	4 – 3	Lake Superior State	BGSU Ice Arena	Recap
Andrew Krelove 05:03; John Mazzei - 06:26; Tommy Dee - 16:32		First period	No scoring
No scoring		Second period	08:53 - Steven Kaunisto; 14:50 - pp - Steven Kaunisto
Todd McIlrath - 09:10		Third period	13:59 - Nathan Perkovich
Nick Eno ( 20 saves / 23 shots )		Goalie stats	Brian Mahoney-Wilson ( 32 saves / 36 shots )

March 8	Bowling Green	1 – 6	Lake Superior State	BGSU Ice Arena	Recap
Jacob Cepis - pp - 11:12		First period	04:59 - Will Acton; 07:50 - Pat Aubry; 08:51 - Simon Gysbers; 14:19 - pp - Dan Eves
No scoring		Second period	No scoring
No scoring		Third period	09:19 - sh - Will Acton; 13:39 - Dan Eves
Nick Eno ( 20 saves / 24 shots ) Jimmy Spratt ( 6 saves / 8 shots )		Goalie stats	Pat Inglis ( 34 saves / 35 shots )

March 9	Bowling Green	4 – 3	OT	Lake Superior State	BGSU Ice Arena	Recap
Tomas Petruska - pp - 06:03		First period		01:05 - Will Acton
Derek Whitmore - pp - 12:02		Second period		06:15 - pp - Troy Schwab; 08:45 - pp - Nathan Perkovich
Todd McIlrath - 17:00		Third period		No scoring
Jacob Cepis - 01:34		First overtime period		No scoring
Jimmy Spratt ( 29 saves / 32 shots )		Goalie stats		Pat Inglis ( 49 saves / 53 shots )

Bowling Green won series 2–1

==== (8) Nebraska-Omaha vs. (9) Alaska ====
March 6	Nebraska-Omaha	4 – 3	Alaska	Qwest Center Omaha	Recap
Brandon Scero - pp - 11:55		First period	No scoring
J. J. Koehler - 08:48; Tomas Klempa - 16:24; Jeric Agosta - sh - 17:39		Second period	06:37 - pp - Dustin Sather; 19:40 - pp - Jeff Penner
No scoring		Third period	00:50 - pp - Jeff Penner
Jerad Kaufmann ( 28 saves / 31 shots )		Goalie stats	Wylie Rogers ( 22 saves / 26 shots )

March 8	Nebraska-Omaha	3 – 5	Alaska	Qwest Center Omaha	Recap
Eric Olimb - 15:41		First period	07:43 - pp - Landon Novotney; 18:31 - pp - Ryan Hohl
No scoring		Second period	04:03 - pp - Dion Knelsen; 18:03 - Tyler Eckford
Brandon Scero - pp - 05:43; Joey Martin - 17:12		Third period	19:51 - en - Derek Klassen
Jerad Kaufmann ( 22 saves / 26 shots )		Goalie stats	Wylie Rogers ( 28 saves / 31 shots )

March 9	Nebraska-Omaha	2 – 1	3OT	Alaska	Qwest Center Omaha	Recap
No Scoring		First period		11:06 - sh - Trevor Hyatt
Matt Ambroz - pp - 14:19		Second period		No scoring
No scoring		Third period		No scoring
J. P. Platisha - 04:22		Third overtime period		No scoring
Jerad Kaufmann ( 64 saves / 66 shots )		Goalie stats		Wylie Rogers ( 51 saves / 52 shots )

Nebraska-Omaha won series 2–1

=== Quarterfinals ===
==== (1) Michigan vs. (8) Nebraska-Omaha ====
March 14	Michigan	10 – 1	Nebraska-Omaha	Yost Ice Arena	Recap
Brandon Naurato - pp - 04:53; Chad Kolarik - 10:29; Chad Kolarik - 18:05		First period	No scoring
Carl Hagelin - sh - 10:37; Travis Turnbull - 18:47		Second period	No scoring
Chad Kolarik - 00:30; Louie Caporusso - 01:25; Mark Mitera - 04:21; Kevin Porter - 11:44; Danny Fardig - 14:07		Third period	02:50 - pp - Tomas Klempa
Billy Sauer ( 12 saves / 13 shots ) Shawn Hunwick ( 2 saves / 2 shots )		Goalie stats	Jerad Kaufmann ( 14 saves / 18 shots ) Jeremie Dupont ( 10 saves / 15 shots ) Eric Aarnio ( 6 saves / 7 shots )

March 15	Michigan	2 – 1	Nebraska-Omaha	Yost Ice Arena	Recap
Brandon Naurato - 03:14; Carl Hagelin - 18:57		First period	No scoring
No scoring		Second period	05:25 - pp - Dan Charleston
No scoring		Third period	No scoring
Billy Sauer ( 26 saves / 27 shots )		Goalie stats	Jerad Kaufmann ( 34 saves / 36 shots )

Michigan won series 2–0

==== (2) Miami vs. (7) Bowling Green ====
March 14	Miami	4 – 1	Bowling Green	Steve Cady Arena	Recap
Pat Cannone - 03:51; Nathan Davis - 14:44		First period	03:35 - John Mazzei
No scoring		Second period	No scoring
Pat Cannone - pp - 06:14; Tommy Wingels - pp - 16:55		Third period	No scoring
Jeff Zatkoff ( 27 saves / 28 shots )		Goalie stats	Jimmy Spratt ( 25 saves / 29 shots )

March 15	Miami	4 – 2	Bowling Green	Steve Cady Arena	Recap
Justin Mercier - 05:57; Carter Camper - 13:22		First period	14:35 - Tommy Dee
Nathan Davis - pp - 13:41; Ryan Jones - 18:54		Second period	No scoring
No scoring		Third period	16:48 - pp - Brandon Svendsen
Jeff Zatkoff ( 41 saves / 43 shots )		Goalie stats	Nick Eno ( 18 saves / 22 shots )

Miami won series 2–0

==== (3) Michigan State vs. (6) Northern Michigan ====
March 14	Michigan State	5 – 1	Northern Michigan	Munn Ice Arena	Recap
Bryan Lerg - pp - 05:08		First period	04:32 - sh - Mark Olver; 14:50 - pp - Steven Kaunisto
Justin Abdelkader - pp - 16:29		Second period	No scoring
Nick Sucharski - 05:42; Tim Crowder - pp - 11:04; Tim Kennedy - 13:44		Third period	No scoring
Jeff Lerg ( 24 saves / 25 shots )		Goalie stats	Brian Stewart ( 35 saves / 40 shots ) Derek Janzen ( 3 saves / 3 shots )

March 15	Michigan State	1 – 2	Northern Michigan	Munn Ice Arena	Recap
No Scoring		First period	No scoring
Tim Crowder - pp - 18:53		Second period	03:56 - Mark Olver
No scoring		Third period	08:13 - Ray Kaunisto
Jeff Lerg ( 28 saves / 30 shots )		Goalie stats	Brian Stewart ( 41 saves / 42 shots )

March 16	Michigan State	2 – 3	OT	Northern Michigan	Munn Ice Arena	Recap
No Scoring		First period		17:51 - Andrew Sarauer
Bryan Lerg - 03:48		Second period		14:45 - Phil Fox
Nick Sucharski - 17:02		Third period		No scoring
No scoring		First overtime period		11:04 - pp - Matt Butcher
Jeff Lerg ( 34 saves / 37 shots )		Goalie stats		Brian Stewart ( 41 saves / 43 shots )

Northern Michigan won series 2–1

==== (4) Notre Dame vs. (5) Ferris State ====
March 14	Notre Dame	1 – 2	Ferris State	Joyce Center	Recap
Ben Ryan - 19:49		First period	04:08 - Cody Chupp; 08:32 - pp - Justin Menke
No scoring		Second period	No scoring
No scoring		Third period	No scoring
Jordan Pearce ( 26 saves / 28 shots )		Goalie stats	Mitch O'Keefe ( 25 saves / 26 shots )

March 15	Notre Dame	6 – 3	Ferris State	Joyce Center	Recap
Calle Ridderwall - 09:53		First period	No scoring
Ian Cole - 07:15; Ian Cole - 16:54		Second period	11:11 - pp - Mike Fillinger; 13:29 - pp - Corey Couturier
Erik Condra - pp - 04:50; Ben Ryan - pp - 13:28; Kyle Lawson - en - 18:24		Third period	16:45 - pp - Zach Redmond
Jordan Pearce ( 22 saves / 25 shots )		Goalie stats	Mitch O'Keefe ( 30 saves / 35 shots )

March 16	Notre Dame	2 – 1	Ferris State	Joyce Center	Recap
Dan Kissel - 02:31		First period	04:16 - Adam Miller
Ian Cole - pp - 00:52		Second period	No scoring
No scoring		Third period	No scoring
Jordan Pearce ( 24 saves / 25 shots )		Goalie stats	Mitch O'Keefe ( 25 saves / 27 shots )

Notre Dame won series 2–1

=== Semifinals ===
==== (1) Michigan vs. (6) Northern Michigan ====
March 21	Michigan	6 – 4	Northern Michigan	Joe Louis Arena	Recap
Chad Kolarik - 07:19		First period	15:05 - Matt Butcher
Travis Turnbull = 09:31		Second period	14:54 - Mark Olver; 16:47 - Matt Siddall
Tim Miller - 01:19; Travis Turnbull - pp - 06:30; Tim Miller - 16:00; Ben Winnett - en - 19:48		Third period	12:44 - Jared Brown
Billy Sauer ( 18 saves / 22 shots )		Goalie stats	Brian Stewart ( 36 saves / 41 shots )

==== (2) Miami vs. (4) Notre Dame ====
March 21	Miami	2 – 1	OT	Notre Dame	Joe Louis Arena	Recap
No Scoring		First period		No scoring
No scoring		Second period		No scoring
Mitch Ganzak - 19:56		Third period		15:30 - Evan Rankin
Alec Martinez - 06:06		First overtime period		No scoring
Jeff Zatkoff ( 20 saves / 21 shots )		Goalie stats		Jordan Pearce ( 28 saves / 30 shots )

=== Third place ===
==== (4) Notre Dame vs. (6) Northern Michigan ====
March 22	Notre Dame	1 – 2	Northern Michigan	Joe Louis Arena	Recap
Christian Hanson - 07:32		First period	No scoring
No scoring		Second period	No scoring
No scoring		Third period	01:15 - Tim Hartung; 03:31 - Matt Siddall
Jordan Pearce ( 19 saves / 21 shots )		Goalie stats	Reid Ellingson ( 14 saves / 15 shots ) Derek Janzen ( 25 saves / 25 shots )

=== Championship ===
==== (1) Michigan vs. (2) Miami ====
March 22	Michigan	2 – 1	Miami	Joe Louis Arena	Recap
Aaron Palushaj - 07:38		First period	No scoring
No scoring		Second period	No scoring
Brandon Naurato - 10:00		Third period	19:21 - pp - Alec Martinez
Billy Sauer ( 27 saves / 28 shots )		Goalie stats	Jeff Zatkoff ( 24 saves / 26 shots )

== Tournament awards ==
=== All-Tournament Team ===
- F Matt Siddall (Northern Michigan)
- F Tim Miller* (Michigan)
- F Ryan Jones (Miami)
- D Mark Mitera (Michigan)
- D Alec Martinez (Miami)
- G Jeff Zatkoff (Miami)

* Most Valuable Player(s)
