= Sebastian Furchner =

German ice hockey player

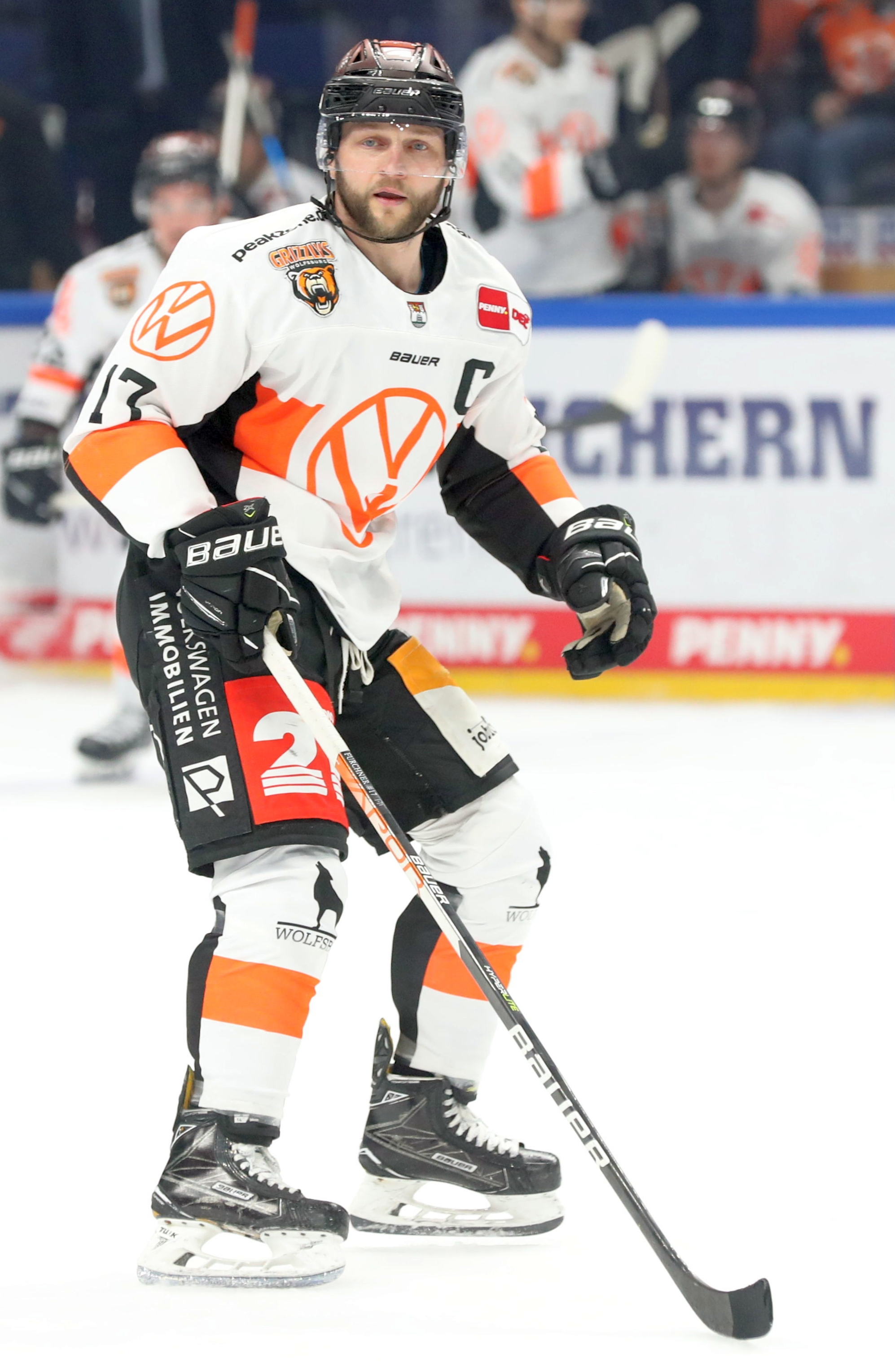
- Born: May 3, 1982 (age 42); Kaufbeuren, West Germany
- Height: 5 ft 9 in (175 cm)
- Weight: 185 lb (84 kg; 13 st 3 lb)
- Position: Left wing
- Shot: Left
- Played for: Kölner Haie; Grizzlys Wolfsburg
- National team: Germany
- Playing career: 1999–2022

Sebastian Furchner (born May 3, 1982) is a German former professional ice hockey player. He played for Kölner Haie and Grizzlys Wolfsburg in the Deutsche Eishockey Liga (DEL). He was signed to a five-year contract extension with Wolfsburg on September 16, 2015.

Nearing the completion of 2021–22 season, captaining his fourth season with Grizzlys Wolfsburg, Furchner opted to announce his retirement from professional hockey due to injury in concluding a 23-year career on 24 March 2022.

== Career statistics ==
=== Regular season and playoffs ===
| | | | Regular season | | | | | Playoffs |
| Season | Team | League | GP | G | A | Pts | PIM | GP | G | A | Pts | PIM |
|---|---|---|---|---|---|---|---|---|---|---|---|---|
| 1998–99 | ESV Kaufbeuren | DEU.4 | 1 | 1 | 0 | 1 | 0 | — | — | — | — | — |
| 1999–2000 | ESV Kaufbeuren | DEU.4 | 49 | 17 | 12 | 29 | 26 | — | — | — | — | — |
| 1999–2000 | ESV Kaufbeuren | DEU U20 | 8 | 12 | 7 | 19 | 6 | — | — | — | — | — |
| 2000–01 | ESV Kaufbeuren | DEU.3 | 44 | 11 | 11 | 22 | 28 | 3 | 1 | 0 | 1 | 4 |
| 2001–02 | REV Bremerhaven | DEU.2 | 50 | 15 | 7 | 22 | 34 | 10 | 4 | 2 | 6 | 8 |
| 2002–03 | Kölner Haie | DEL | 51 | 5 | 11 | 16 | 14 | 15 | 1 | 0 | 1 | 6 |
| 2003–04 | Kölner Haie | DEL | 52 | 11 | 7 | 18 | 10 | 6 | 0 | 0 | 0 | 0 |
| 2004–05 | Kölner Haie | DEL | 49 | 13 | 17 | 30 | 38 | 7 | 0 | 2 | 2 | 2 |
| 2005–06 | Kölner Haie | DEL | 45 | 9 | 12 | 21 | 65 | — | — | — | — | — |
| 2006–07 | Kölner Haie | DEL | 49 | 13 | 13 | 26 | 36 | 9 | 0 | 0 | 0 | 8 |
| 2007–08 | Kölner Haie | DEL | 55 | 15 | 13 | 28 | 50 | 12 | 5 | 0 | 5 | 4 |
| 2008–09 | Grizzly Adams Wolfsburg | DEL | 39 | 11 | 17 | 28 | 30 | 10 | 4 | 4 | 8 | 14 |
| 2009–10 | Grizzly Adams Wolfsburg | DEL | 55 | 16 | 23 | 39 | 30 | 7 | 3 | 3 | 6 | 6 |
| 2010–11 | Grizzly Adams Wolfsburg | DEL | 52 | 10 | 14 | 24 | 24 | 6 | 1 | 2 | 3 | 25 |
| 2011–12 | Grizzly Adams Wolfsburg | DEL | 52 | 12 | 22 | 34 | 20 | 4 | 0 | 1 | 1 | 2 |
| 2012–13 | Grizzly Adams Wolfsburg | DEL | 50 | 17 | 17 | 34 | 26 | 12 | 2 | 5 | 7 | 4 |
| 2013–14 | Grizzly Adams Wolfsburg | DEL | 48 | 18 | 5 | 23 | 18 | 11 | 5 | 5 | 10 | 2 |
| 2014–15 | Grizzly Adams Wolfsburg | DEL | 46 | 21 | 15 | 36 | 16 | 11 | 5 | 5 | 10 | 2 |
| 2015–16 | Grizzly Wolfsburg | DEL | 50 | 22 | 22 | 44 | 16 | 14 | 3 | 6 | 9 | 4 |
| 2016–17 | Grizzly Wolfsburg | DEL | 51 | 24 | 16 | 40 | 8 | 18 | 4 | 11 | 15 | 2 |
| 2017–18 | Grizzly Wolfsburg | DEL | 52 | 12 | 13 | 25 | 12 | 7 | 2 | 2 | 4 | 2 |
| 2018–19 | Grizzly Wolfsburg | DEL | 50 | 14 | 7 | 21 | 16 | — | — | — | — | — |
| 2019–20 | Grizzly Wolfsburg | DEL | 35 | 7 | 8 | 15 | 6 | — | — | — | — | — |
| 2020–21 | Grizzly Wolfsburg | DEL | 34 | 8 | 10 | 18 | 2 | 9 | 1 | 3 | 4 | 4 |
| 2021–22 | Grizzly Wolfsburg | DEL | 45 | 8 | 5 | 13 | 14 | 1 | 0 | 0 | 0 | 0 |
| DEL totals | | | 960 | 266 | 267 | 533 | 451 | 159 | 36 | 45 | 81 | 91 |

=== International ===
| Year | Team | Event | GP | G | A | Pts | PIM |
|---|---|---|---|---|---|---|---|
| 2000 | Germany | WJC18 | 6 | 0 | 1 | 1 | 10 |
| 2001 | Germany | WJC D1 | 5 | 2 | 0 | 2 | 25 |
| 2002 | Germany | WJC D1 | 5 | 1 | 3 | 4 | 8 |
| 2005 | Germany | WC | 6 | 2 | 1 | 3 | 0 |
| 2006 | Germany | OG | 1 | 0 | 0 | 0 | 0 |
| 2012 | Germany | WC | 7 | 0 | 0 | 0 | 2 |
| Junior totals | | | 16 | 3 | 4 | 7 | 43 |
| Senior totals | | | 14 | 2 | 1 | 3 | 2 |
