= Julian Talbot =

Canadian ice hockey player

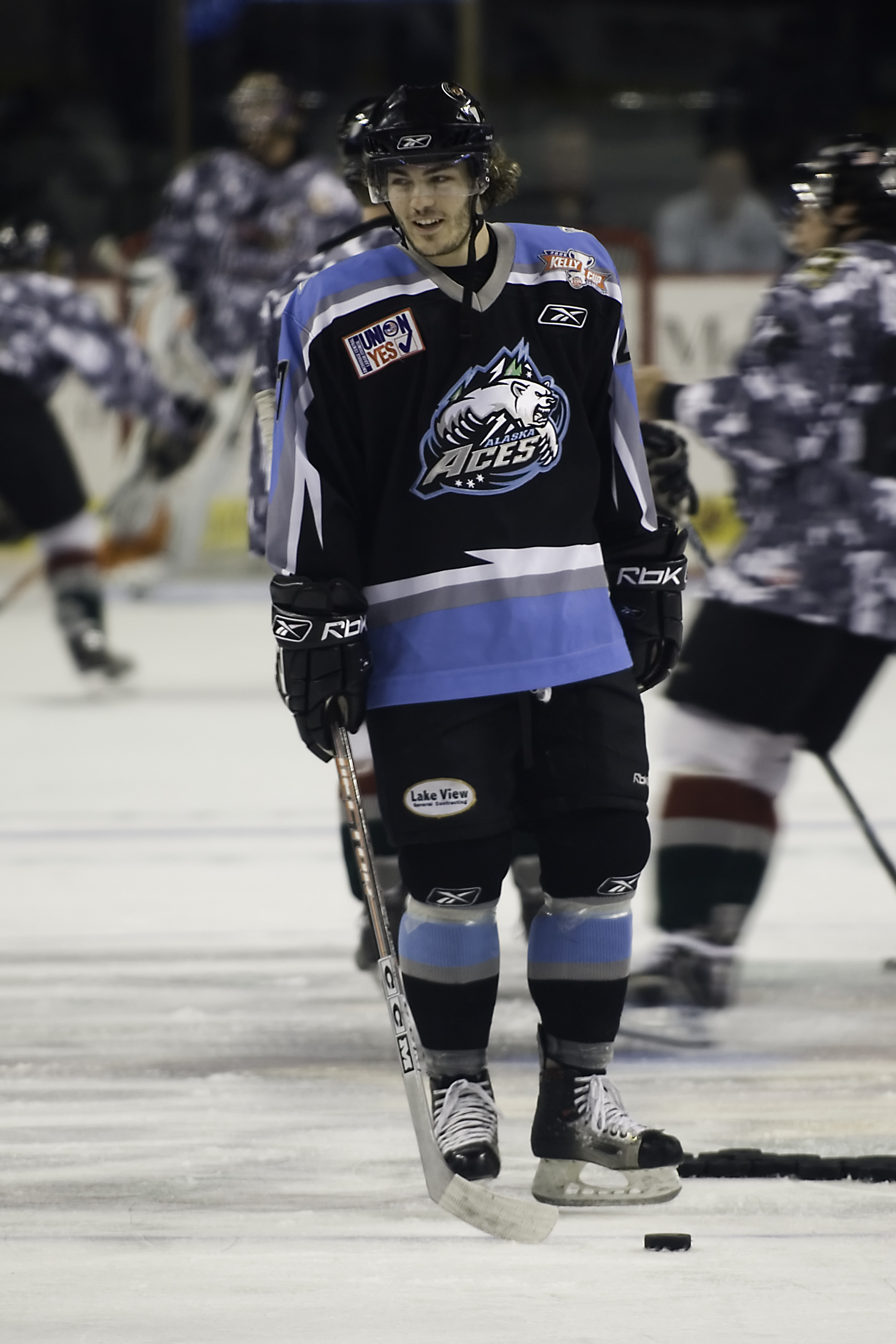
- Born: March 24, 1985 (age 41) Wahnapitae, Ontario, Canada
- Height: 5 ft 11 in (180 cm)
- Weight: 179 lb (81 kg; 12 st 11 lb)
- Position: Defence / Center
- Shot: Left
- Played for: Providence Bruins; Peoria Rivermen; Lake Erie Monsters; Eisbären Berlin; EC KAC; Nottingham Panthers
- NHL draft: Undrafted
- Playing career: 2006–2020

Julian Talbot (born March 24, 1985) is a Canadian former professional ice hockey defenceman, converted from center, who last played for the Nottingham Panthers in the Elite Ice Hockey League.

== Playing career ==
Talbot, a Wahnapitae native, followed his older brother Joe in playing Major junior hockey in the Ontario Hockey League with the Ottawa 67's. In his rookie 2002–03 season Talbot displayed offensive potential in recording 10 goals and 28 points in 62 games. His offensive contributions to the 67's steadily increased in the following two seasons, earning successive team nominations for the William Hanley Trophy in 2003–04, 2004–05 seasons as the team's most sportsmanlike player. Although going undrafted in the NHL, Talbot earned praise as an underrated player with leadership qualities. In his final year with the 67's in 2005–06, Julian captained the team and finished second in scoring with 30 goals and 77 points in 65 games.

After finishing his last year with the 67's, Talbot now a free agent, reunited with his brother Joe and attended the ECHL training camp of the Alaska Aces. Showing offensive ability he signed a contract and began his first professional season in 2006–07 with Alaska. Talbot quickly settled with the Aces and scored his first professional goal on November 3, 2006, against the Victoria Salmon Kings. He went on to score 20 goals and 53 points in 63 regular season games while also earning a selection on the National Conference Team at the ECHL All-Star Game. Talbot's eventful rookie season also included signing a professional try-out in which he made his American Hockey League debut with the Providence Bruins. Talbot scored his first AHL goal against the Springfield Falcons on February 16, 2007, and after 7 games was returned to the Aces to lead the team in playoff scoring with 20 points in 15 games as they reached the National Conference finals.

As the Aces were an affiliate to the St. Louis Blues, he was invited to the Blues NHL training camp for the coming 2007–08 season on September 12, 2007. Following a promising performance with the Blues he was later reassigned to their AHL affiliate, where he was offered a one-year contract with the Peoria Rivermen. In his first full season in the AHL, he established a scoring presence with the Rivermen and was leading the team in goals when he was signed to a two-year contract with the St. Louis Blues on March 19, 2008. Talbot's contract was celebrated in the Rivermen's next game against the Lake Erie Monsters as he scored his second hat-trick of the season and added an assist while also matching an AHL single-game season high in Plus/minus (+5) to be named as the AHL player of the week for March 23. Julian finished the year to co-lead Peoria, alongside Charles Linglet, in goals with 24 in 78 games.

In the 2008–09 season, he returned to Peoria for the entire season finishing second on the team with 20 goals for 43 points in 65 games. Providing efficiency on the powerplay, Talbot led the team with ten goals and 21 Powerplay points. On September 21, 2009, Talbot, in the final year of his contract, was again reassigned by the Blues to the Rivermen for his third consecutive season with the team. In the 2009–10 season, on November 6, 2009, Talbot posted an assist against the Milwaukee Admirals to mark his 100th point in the AHL. Although Talbot's numbers declined for the second successive season, he posted 17 goals and 32 points in 76 games with the Rivermen.

On June 17, 2010, after three seasons within the Blues organization, Julian was traded to the Colorado Avalanche for T.J. Hensick. He was then signed as a restricted free agent to a one-year contract with the Avalanche on July 2, 2010. After attending the Avalanche's training camp Talbot was reassigned to AHL affiliate, the Lake Erie Monsters to start the 2010–11 season.

Talbot joined Eisbären Berlin for the 2011–12 season on August 5, 2011. In his first European season, Talbot embraced a scoring role on the second line of the Polar Bears, producing 36 points in 49 games, to help Eisbären finish as regular season and playoff champions. In the following 2012–13 season, he made the switch to defense, after previously having been a center his entire career. His transition proved successful as he helped the Polar Bears to a third successive title and led the league in playoff scoring with 19 point in just 13 games.

After spending the 2017–18 campaign in the neighbouring Austrian Hockey League with EC KAC, Talbot opted to return to Germany in securing a one-year deal with second tier club, Eispiraten Crimmitschau of the DEL2 on September 6, 2018.

After a season in the UK with the Nottingham Panthers, Talbot announced his retirement from hockey on September 11, 2020.

== Career statistics ==
			Regular season					Playoffs
Season	Team	League	GP	G	A	Pts	PIM	GP	G	A	Pts	PIM
2002–03	Ottawa 67's	OHL	62	10	18	28	13	23	1	7	8	2
2003–04	Ottawa 67's	OHL	68	18	31	49	56	7	1	4	5	6
2004–05	Ottawa 67's	OHL	68	25	41	66	50	21	8	12	20	31
2005–06	Ottawa 67's	OHL	65	30	47	77	70	3	1	2	3	8
2006–07	Alaska Aces	ECHL	66	20	33	53	54	15	9	11	20	8
2006–07	Providence Bruins	AHL	7	1	2	3	0	—	—	—	—	—
2007–08	Peoria Rivermen	AHL	78	24	26	50	53	—	—	—	—	—
2008–09	Peoria Rivermen	AHL	65	20	23	43	43	7	0	1	1	4
2009–10	Peoria Rivermen	AHL	76	17	15	32	34	—	—	—	—	—
2010–11	Lake Erie Monsters	AHL	77	13	32	45	41	7	1	1	2	2
2011–12	Eisbären Berlin	DEL	49	15	21	36	48	13	2	5	7	0
2012–13	Eisbären Berlin	DEL	49	13	17	30	48	13	8	11	19	10
2013–14	Eisbären Berlin	DEL	39	12	16	28	36	3	0	0	0	2
2014–15	Eisbären Berlin	DEL	50	12	21	33	30	3	2	1	3	4
2015–16	Eisbären Berlin	DEL	52	7	15	22	54	7	0	0	0	10
2016–17	Eisbären Berlin	DEL	45	4	14	18	40	14	5	4	9	4
2017–18	EC KAC	EBEL	53	13	6	19	44	6	0	2	2	4
2018–19	ETC Crimmitschau	DEL2	52	16	34	50	44	8	3	1	4	46
2019–20	ETC Crimmitschau	DEL2	7	3	4	7	6	—	—	—	—	—
2019–20	Nottingham Panthers	EIHL	33	15	15	30	30	—	—	—	—	—
AHL totals			303	75	98	173	171	14	1	2	3	6
