= Derek Joslin =

Canadian ice hockey player (born 1987)

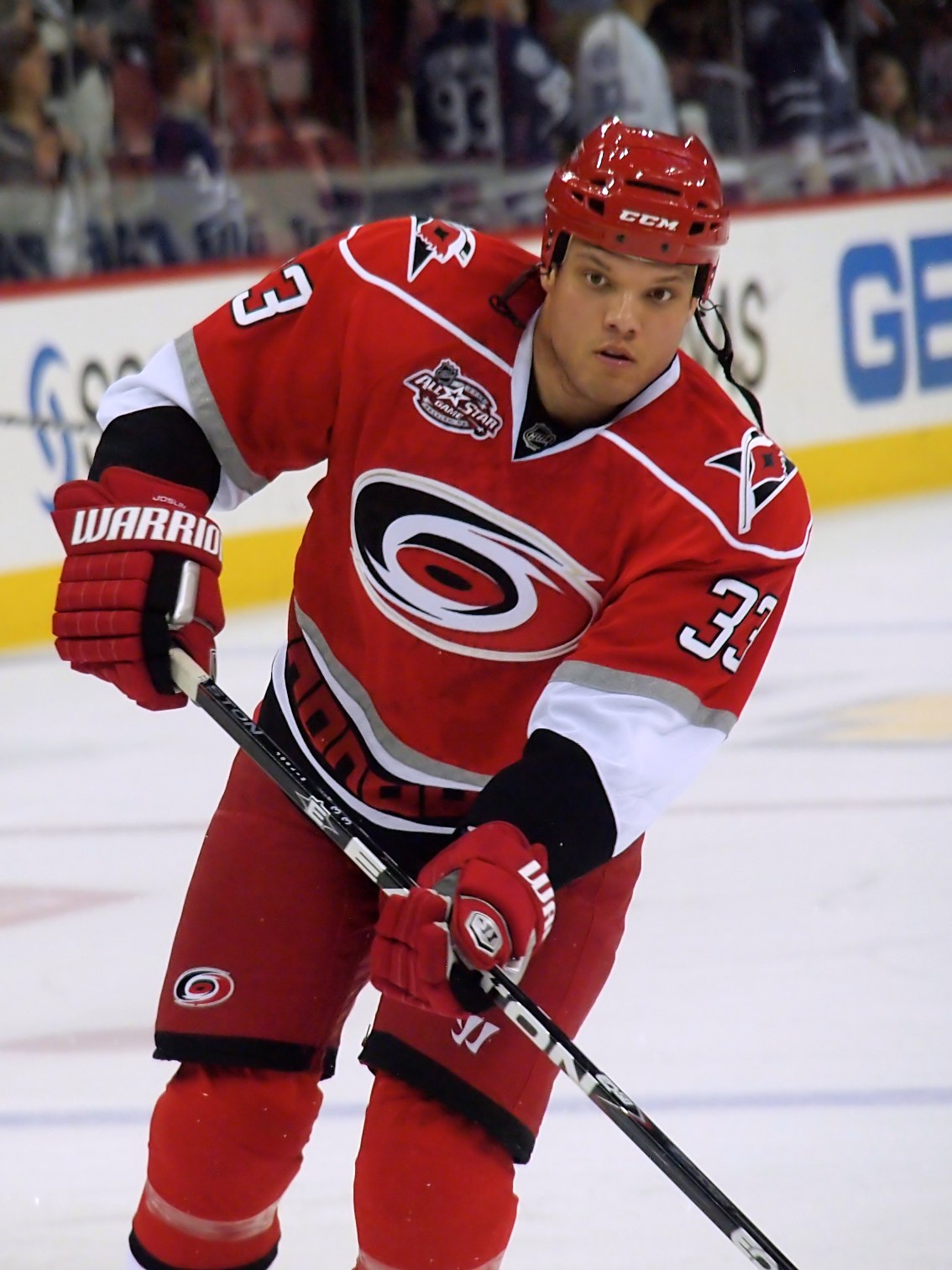
- Joslin with the Carolina Hurricanes in 2011
- Born: March 17, 1987 (age 39) Richmond Hill, Ontario, Canada
- Height: 6 ft 1 in (185 cm)
- Weight: 210 lb (95 kg; 15 st 0 lb)
- Position: Defence
- Shot: Left
- ICEHL team Former teams: EC VSV; San Jose Sharks; Carolina Hurricanes; Vancouver Canucks; AIK IF; Thomas Sabo Ice Tigers; EHC München; EC Red Bull Salzburg
- NHL draft: 149th overall, 2005; San Jose Sharks
- Playing career: 2007–2023

Derek Joslin (born March 17, 1987) is a Canadian former professional ice hockey defenceman. He most recently played for EC VSV of the ICE Hockey League (ICEHL).

He has played in the National Hockey League for the San Jose Sharks, with his NHL debut coming during the 2008-09 campaign, Carolina Hurricanes and the Vancouver Canucks. The Sharks drafted him in the 149th overall in the 2005 NHL entry draft. Joslin played major junior hockey in the Ontario Hockey League (OHL) for the Ottawa 67's. During his time in the OHL he was an All-Star and represented Canada in the Subway Super Series. After finishing his OHL career he played in the American Hockey League (AHL) for the Worcester Sharks, where he was also an All-Star.

== Early life ==
Joslin was born in Richmond Hill, Ontario. He began playing hockey at the age of 4 for the Oak Ridges Kings. His coach was his father, Jeff, who himself played defence at the junior level for the Peterborough Petes. As a youth, Joslin played in the 2001 Quebec International Pee-Wee Hockey Tournament with a minor ice hockey team from Vaughan. Joslin's first job growing-up was as a caddie at Beacon Hall Golf Club.

== Playing career ==
=== Junior ===
Joslin was selected in the 10th round, 200th overall, of the 2003 Ontario Hockey League (OHL) priority draft by the Ottawa 67's. He made his major junior debut as a 16-year-old during the 2003–04 season, playing in 7 games, though he spent the majority of the year with the Aurora Jr. B Tigers in the Ontario Junior Hockey League (OJHL). In the OJHL he amassed 16 points in 36 games.

Joslin began following season with the 67's. He scored Ottawa's first goal of the year, which was also his first career OHL goal, against goaltender Patrick Ehelechner of the Sudbury Wolves. In 68 games he registered 6 goals and 30 points. The point total ranked him second on the team in defence scoring and 18th for all OHL rookies. Ottawa qualified for the playoffs after finishing sixth in the Eastern Conference. Joslin helped the 67's advance to the OHL Finals where they lost to the London Knights. Since London was the host team for the 2005 Memorial Cup the 67's qualified for the tournament as the OHL representative despite their loss. During the OHL playoffs and Memorial Cup Joslin played sparingly due to a broken Scaphoid bone. He registered 3 assists in 21 total playoff games, while Ottawa won just 1 game in the Memorial Cup. During the off-season Joslin was drafted in the 5th round, 149th overall, of the 2005 NHL entry draft by the San Jose Sharks.

In the 2005–06 season Joslin increased his point production to 11 goals and 48 points. Leading the 67's in defence scoring and finishing 14 for defence scoring in the OHL. During the season he was selected to play in the Subway Super Series. Representing the OHL against the Russian selects he played in one game without registering a point, in an OHL 5–1 victory. The win helped the Canadian Hockey League go undefeated winning the series 6–0 over the Russians. During the OHL playoffs he was a point a game player scoring 1 goal and 5 assists as the 67's lost their first round match up to Peterborough 4 games to 2. After the 67's were eliminated he made his professional debut playing two games for the American Hockey League's (AHL) Cleveland Barons.

Joslin returned to the 67's for the 2006–07 season and on December 28, 2006 he signed an entry-level contract with San Jose. Shortly after signing he was named to the OHL All-Star game. In the game, he notched an assisted while registering a +5 rating. Joslin finished the season with almost identical scoring stats registering 11 goals, 38 assists and 49 points. The assist total ranked him third on the team, while he finished tied for 16 in OHL defence scoring. He was again a point a game player in the playoffs registering 1 goal and 4 assist while the 67's lost their first round match-up with the Belleville Bulls 4 games to 1. Like the year before Joslin played in the AHL following the 67's playoff elimination, appearing in three regular season and four playoff games for the Worcester Sharks without registering a point.

=== Professional ===
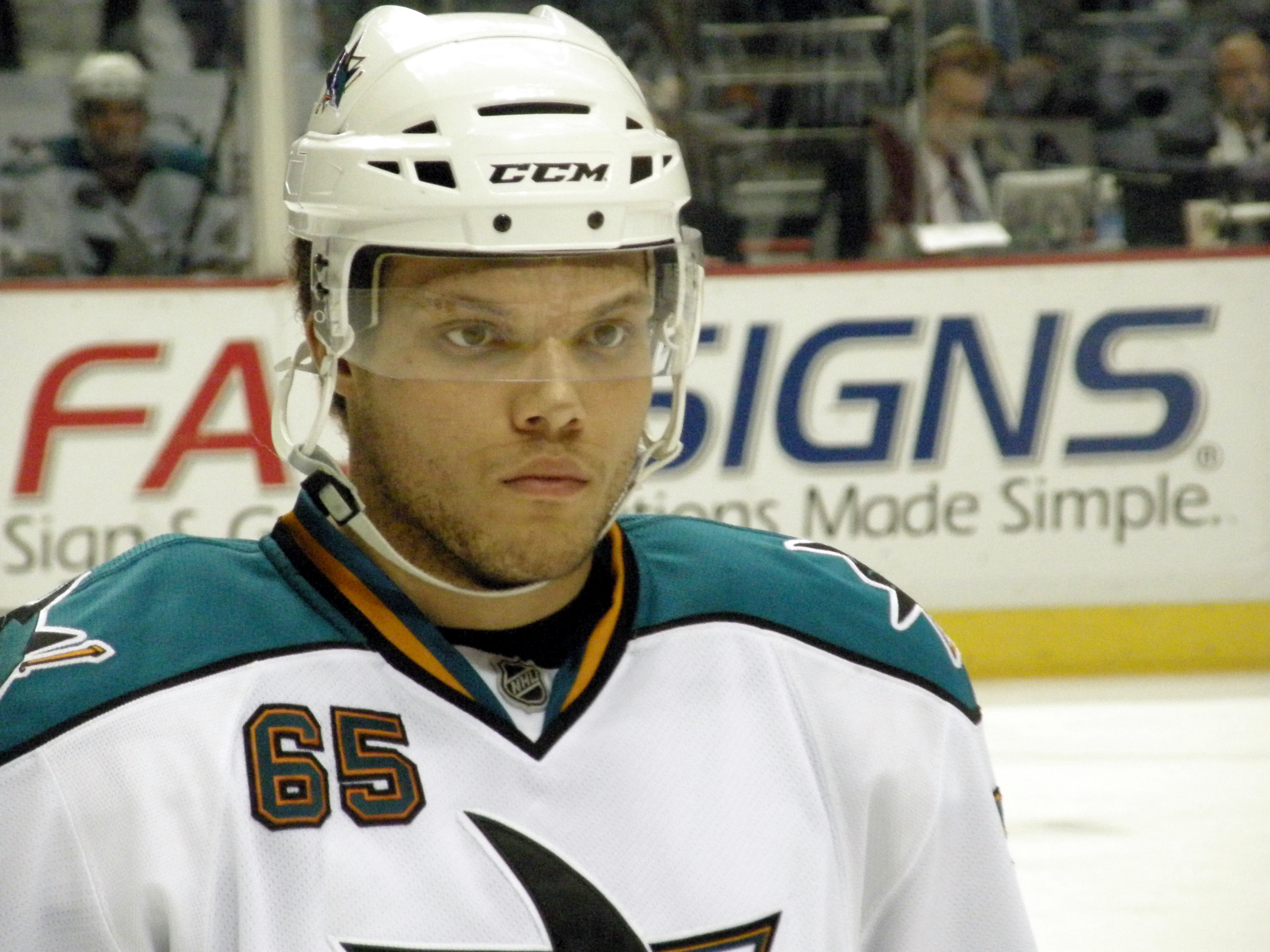
Joslin playing for the San Jose Sharks in 2010

He joined Worcester full-time for the 2007–08 season. He scored his first professional goal, a game-winning goal, against the Manchester Monarchs on the power play. He finished the season playing in a career high 80 games scoring 10 goals and 34 points.

Joslin started the following season with Worcester after being one of the last players cut from San Jose's training camp. By starting the season in the AHL, he set a then franchise record for consecutive games played, at 114. Following an injury to San Jose defenceman Douglas Murray, Joslin made his National Hockey League debut January 3, 2009, in a game against the New York Islanders. He continued to split time between the NHL and the AHL, and was named to the AHL All-Star Game. At the AHL All-Star Skills Competition Joslin won the Hardest Shot Contest shooting a puck at 98.6 mph and also finished second in the Puck Control Relay. He finished the year playing in 12 NHL games, without scoring, and 63 AHL games registering 11 goals and 30 points. The 11 goals tied a Worcester franchise record for defenceman.

For the 2009–10 season, Joslin again split time between the NHL and AHL. He registered his first NHL point, an assist, against the Chicago Blackhawks. It began a career high three game assist streak, which were his only points in 24 NHL games for the year. In the AHL playoffs Joslin scored 4 goals in 11 games tying for the team lead and leading the league for defencemen. In 2010–11 he remained in the NHL for the entire season and scored his first NHL goal on Andrew Raycroft of the Dallas Stars on December 13, 2010. Although he was regularly a healthy scratch playing in only 17 for San Jose before a February 18, 2011 trade sent him to the Carolina Hurricanes in exchange for future considerations. Following some injuries to Hurricanes' defenceman, Joslin received increased ice time including time on the power play. After joining Carolina Joslin scored 5 points in 17 games.

During the off season Joslin became a restricted free agent. The Hurricanes sent him a qualifying offer, but could not come to terms and Joslin filed for salary arbitration. The following day the two sides agreed on a two-year contract. During the first season of his new contract Joslin fell behind other defenceman on the depth chart and was regular healthy scratch, only playing in 14 of the first 41 games. With the belief that Carolina would trade a defenceman head coach Kirk Muller played Joslin at left wing in order to get him back in the line-up and be ready if a trade occurred. After the trade deadline passed, with no trades made, Joslin continued to play wing including his 100th career NHL game. He finished the season playing in an NHL career high 44 games scoring 2 goals and 4 points.

In the off-season Carolina placed Joslin on waivers, after he cleared waivers the Hurricanes bought out the final year of his contract. Upon being bought out Joslin became an unrestricted free agent and signed with the Vancouver Canucks. Due to the 2012–13 NHL lockout he was assigned to the Canucks' minor league affiliate, the Chicago Wolves, at the beginning of the season. Joslin played 53 games for Chicago before he was assigned to the Worcester Sharks while defenceman Danny Groulx was assigned to the Wolves as part of an AHL trade. After playing 13 games with the Sharks, Joslin was called up by the Canucks due to injuries to other defencemen.

Joslin was scheduled to become a restricted free agent on July 5, 2013. However, the Canucks failed to give him a qualifying offer, thus making him an unrestricted free agent. On July 28, 2013, Joslin left North America and signed his first European contract on a one-year deal with AIK IF of the Swedish Hockey League (SHL).

Following his year in Sweden, Joslin took his game to Germany, where he signed with the Nürnberg Ice Tigers of the Deutsche Eishockey Liga (DEL) for the 2014–15 season. He then had his contract renewed by the Nürnberg team for the 2015–16 campaign. After two years with the team, he moved on to his second DEL side in reigning champions, EHC München.

In his three year tenure with München, Joslin helped the club reach the finals in each season, culminating in two DEL championships, before leaving as a free agent following the 2018–19 season.

On May 9, 2019, Joslin moved to the neighbouring Austrian EBEL, signing a one-year contract to remain within the Red Bull-sponsored umbrella with EC Red Bull Salzburg.

== Career statistics ==
			Regular season					Playoffs
Season	Team	League	GP	G	A	Pts	PIM	GP	G	A	Pts	PIM
2003–04	Aurora Tigers	OPJHL	36	4	12	16	48	13	1	6	7	22
2003–04	Ottawa 67's	OHL	7	0	0	0	4	—	—	—	—	—
2004–05	Ottawa 67's	OHL	68	6	24	30	44	21	0	3	3	24
2005–06	Ottawa 67's	OHL	68	11	37	48	40	6	1	5	6	10
2005–06	Cleveland Barons	AHL	2	0	0	0	0	—	—	—	—	—
2006–07	Ottawa 67's	OHL	68	11	38	49	66	5	1	4	5	4
2006–07	Worcester Sharks	AHL	3	0	0	0	0	4	0	0	0	2
2007–08	Worcester Sharks	AHL	80	10	24	34	44	—	—	—	—	—
2008–09	Worcester Sharks	AHL	63	11	19	30	40	12	0	2	2	8
2008–09	San Jose Sharks	NHL	12	0	0	0	6	—	—	—	—	—
2009–10	San Jose Sharks	NHL	24	0	3	3	12	—	—	—	—	—
2009–10	Worcester Sharks	AHL	55	5	27	32	29	11	4	1	5	4
2010–11	San Jose Sharks	NHL	17	1	3	4	8	—	—	—	—	—
2010–11	Carolina Hurricanes	NHL	17	1	4	5	2	—	—	—	—	—
2011–12	Carolina Hurricanes	NHL	44	2	2	4	35	—	—	—	—	—
2011–12	Charlotte Checkers	AHL	4	0	3	3	0	—	—	—	—	—
2012–13	Chicago Wolves	AHL	53	2	8	10	40	—	—	—	—	—
2012–13	Worcester Sharks	AHL	13	2	4	6	7	—	—	—	—	—
2012–13	Vancouver Canucks	NHL	2	0	0	0	0	—	—	—	—	—
2013–14	AIK	SHL	54	5	12	17	40	—	—	—	—	—
2014–15	Thomas Sabo Ice Tigers	DEL	51	3	18	21	36	8	0	2	2	4
2015–16	Thomas Sabo Ice Tigers	DEL	52	6	27	33	16	12	0	2	2	2
2016–17	EHC Red Bull München	DEL	51	9	16	25	20	14	4	3	7	2
2017–18	EHC Red Bull München	DEL	52	6	22	28	14	17	0	14	14	2
2018–19	EHC Red Bull München	DEL	52	5	10	15	16	18	3	5	8	2
2019–20	EC Red Bull Salzburg	EBEL	48	4	17	21	18	3	0	3	3	0
2020–21	EC Red Bull Salzburg	ICEHL	46	5	24	29	30	11	0	7	7	10
2021–22	EC VSV	ICEHL	46	1	20	21	8	12	2	6	8	2
NHL totals			116	4	12	16	63	—	—	—	—	—
DEL totals			258	29	93	122	102	69	7	26	33	12

== See also ==
- List of black NHL players
