= Travis Turnbull =

American ice hockey player (born 1986)

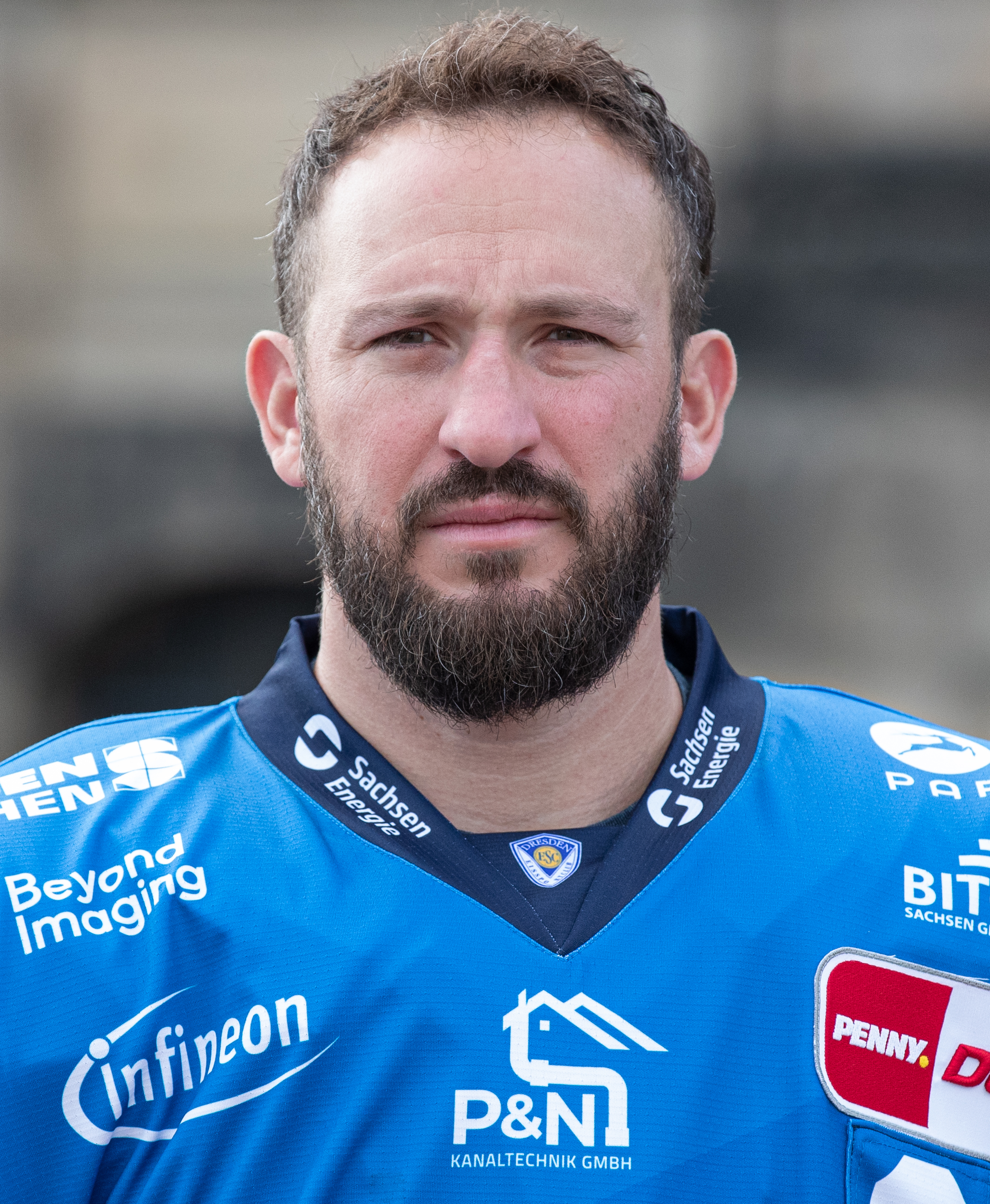
- Turnbull in 2025
- Born: July 7, 1986 (age 40) Chesterfield, Missouri, U.S.
- Height: 6 ft 0 in (183 cm)
- Weight: 194 lb (88 kg; 13 st 12 lb)
- Position: Centre
- Shoots: Right
- DEL2 team Former teams: Dresdner Eislöwen; Buffalo Sabres; Düsseldorfer EG; ERC Ingolstadt; Färjestad BK; Kölner Haie; Iserlohn Roosters; Straubing Tigers; Schwenninger Wild Wings
- NHL draft: Undrafted
- Playing career: 2009–present

Travis John Turnbull (born July 7, 1986) is an American professional ice hockey player who is currently playing for the Dresdner Eislöwen in the German second tier DEL2.

== Playing career ==
As a youth, Turnbull played in the 2000 Quebec International Pee-Wee Hockey Tournament with the St. Louis Blues minor ice hockey team. He later played four years of college hockey at the University of Michigan with the Michigan Wolverines men's ice hockey team, where in his third year he helped his team win the 2007-08 CCHA Championship.

On April 6, 2009, the Buffalo Sabres signed Turnbull to a two-year entry-level contract and assigned him to play for their AHL affiliate, the Portland Pirates. On July 15, 2011 the Sabres re-signed Turnbull, who had arbitration rights, to an extension. On March 23, 2012, Turnbull scored his first NHL goal against the New York Rangers in Madison Square Garden.

After a productive debut 2012–13 season in Germany with Düsseldorfer EG, Turnbull moved to sign a one-year contract campaign with rivals ERC Ingolstadt on May 28, 2013. He helped ERC win the 2014 German national championship, before returning to Düsseldorf for the 2014-15 campaign. In December 2015, he headed to Sweden, signing with SHL side Färjestad BK.

In April 2016, Turnbull agreed to terms on a one-year contract with German team Kölner Haie. In the 2016–17 season, Turnbull was unable to match his career averages posting just 7 goals and 12 points in 35 games with the Sharks. Leaving Kölner at the conclusion of the campaign, Turnbull opted to continue in the DEL, agreeing to a one-year deal with the Iserlohn Roosters on July 7, 2017.

Turnbull played two seasons with the Roosters, before leaving as a free agent following the 2018–19 campaign, signing a one-year contract with his fifth DEL club, the Straubing Tigers, on April 24, 2019.

Turnbull left the Tigers at the conclusion of his contract and continued his journeyman career in the DEL by agreeing to a one-year pact with Schwenninger Wild Wings on March 12, 2020.

== Personal ==
Travis is the son of former NHL player Perry Turnbull. Turnbull was born in the St. Louis area suburb of Chesterfield, when his father was a member of the St. Louis Blues. Turnbull and his wife Kasey have three daughters.

== Career statistics ==
			Regular season					Playoffs
Season	Team	League	GP	G	A	Pts	PIM	GP	G	A	Pts	PIM
2003–04	Sioux City Musketeers	USHL	56	7	12	19	73	7	0	0	0	9
2004–05	Sioux City Musketeers	USHL	44	17	21	38	103	13	4	2	6	61
2005–06	University of Michigan	CCHA	41	9	9	18	67	—	—	—	—	—
2006–07	University of Michigan	CCHA	41	8	9	17	52	—	—	—	—	—
2007–08	University of Michigan	CCHA	43	15	12	27	48	—	—	—	—	—
2008–09	University of Michigan	CCHA	41	8	20	28	74	—	—	—	—	—
2008–09	Portland Pirates	AHL	3	0	0	0	5	5	0	0	0	4
2009–10	Portland Pirates	AHL	57	9	9	18	98	4	0	0	0	2
2010–11	Portland Pirates	AHL	20	5	4	9	28	10	1	1	2	2
2011–12	Rochester Americans	AHL	63	12	15	27	117	3	0	0	0	4
2011–12	Buffalo Sabres	NHL	3	1	0	1	5	—	—	—	—	—
2012–13	Düsseldorfer EG	DEL	50	12	34	46	88	—	—	—	—	—
2013–14	ERC Ingolstadt	DEL	51	18	21	39	72	19	8	8	16	20
2014–15	Düsseldorfer EG	DEL	52	19	19	38	46	12	2	3	5	10
2015–16	Düsseldorfer EG	DEL	26	3	9	12	24	—	—	—	—	—
2015–16	Färjestad BK	SHL	23	5	7	12	18	5	0	1	1	6
2016–17	Kölner Haie	DEL	35	7	5	12	32	7	1	1	2	4
2017–18	Iserlohn Roosters	DEL	49	6	19	25	54	2	1	1	2	0
2018–19	Iserlohn Roosters	DEL	44	9	9	18	57	—	—	—	—	—
2019–20	Straubing Tigers	DEL	40	13	12	25	16	—	—	—	—	—
2020–21	Schwenninger Wild Wings	DEL	32	8	3	11	14	—	—	—	—	—
2021–22	Schwenninger Wild Wings	DEL	52	16	12	28	34	—	—	—	—	—
2022–23	Straubing Tigers	DEL	47	9	5	14	26	6	1	2	3	4
2023–24	Dresdner Eislöwen	DEL2	14	4	6	10	18	—	—	—	—	—
NHL totals			3	1	0	1	5	—	—	—	—	—
DEL totals			478	120	148	268	463	46	13	15	28	38
