= Laurin Braun =

German professional ice hockey forward

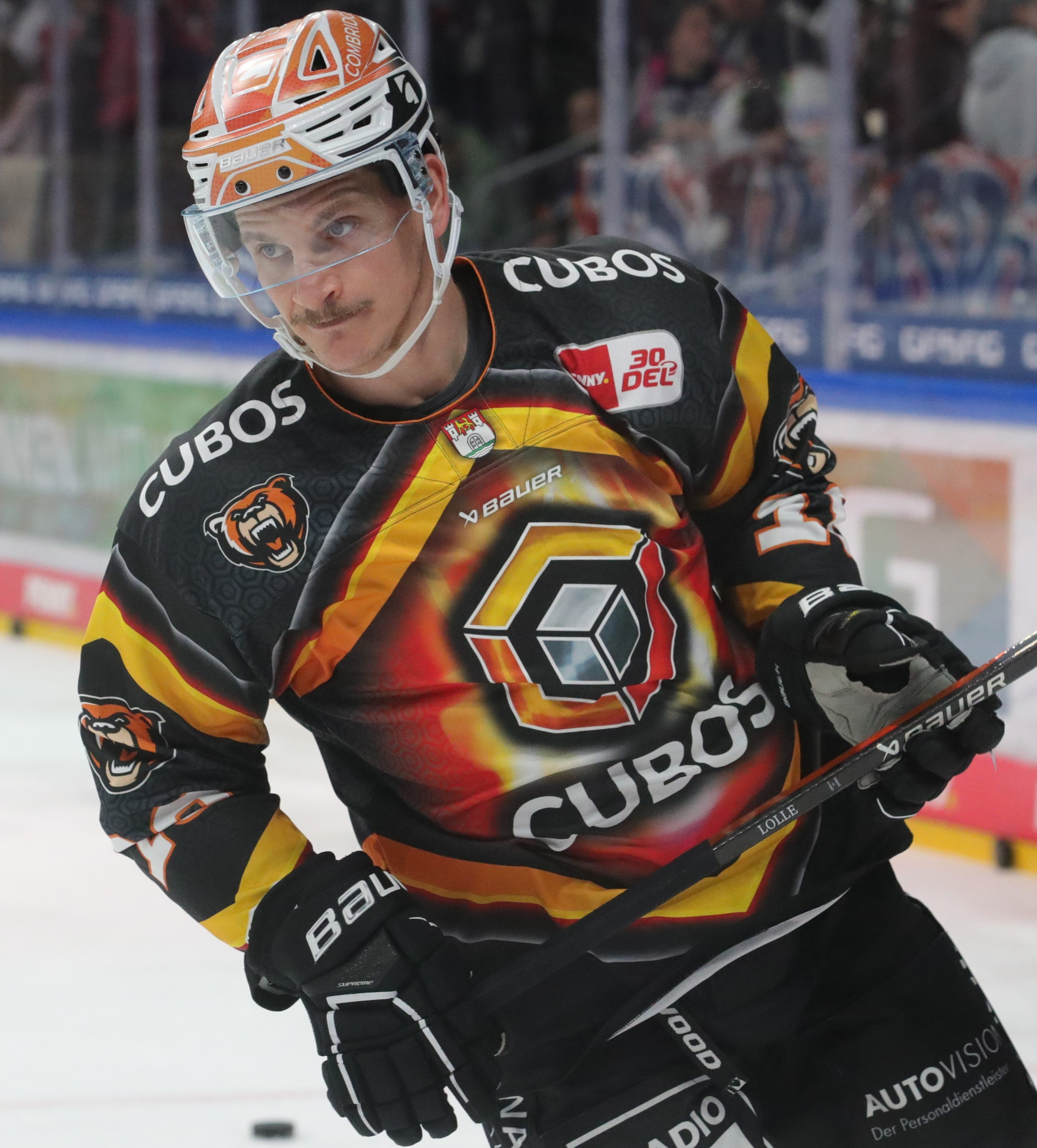
- Braun in 2023
- Born: 18 February 1991 (age 34); Lampertheim, Germany
- Height: 1.80 m (5 ft 11 in)
- Weight: 84 kg (185 lb; 13 st 3 lb)
- Position: Left wing
- Shoots: Left
- DEL team Former teams: Düsseldorfer EG; Eisbären Berlin; ERC Ingolstadt; Krefeld Pinguine; Grizzlys Wolfsburg
- Playing career: 2009–present

Laurin Braun (born 18 February 1991) is a German professional ice hockey forward who is currently playing for Düsseldorfer EG of the Deutsche Eishockey Liga (DEL). His older brother Constantin Braun plays for the Eisbären Berlin.

== Playing career ==
He began playing professionally with Eisbären Berlin in the 2008–09 season. He played with Berlin's junior team in the third-level Oberliga for four seasons. Following the 2016–17 season, Braun opted to leave the only organization he had played with, signing a one-year deal with fellow German club ERC Ingolstadt on June 21, 2017.

Braun contributed with 18 points in his first season in Ingolstadt before returning for a second year with the club in the 2018–19 season. Limited by injury, Braun collected just 6 points in 37 games, before opting to leave the club at the conclusion of the post-season.

On 10 April 2019, Braun agreed to a one-year contract with his third DEL club, the Krefeld Pinguine.

In his third season with Krefeld Pinguine in 2021–22, Braun, as team captain, posted 6 goals and 18 points through 42 regular season games. He was unable to prevent Kreleld from suffering relegation to the DEL2 for the first time in their history.

As a free agent, Braun opted to remain in the DEL, joining Grizzlys Wolfsburg on a two-year contract on 12 May 2022.
