= Derek Dinger =

German ice hockey player (born 1987)

- Born: March 28, 1987 (age 38) Kassel, Germany
- Height: 6 ft 0 in (183 cm)
- Weight: 187 lb (85 kg; 13 st 5 lb)
- Position: Defence
- Shoots: Left
- DEL2 team Former teams: EC Kassel Huskies; Eisbären Berlin; DEG Metro Stars; ERC Ingolstadt; Schwenninger Wild Wings; Augsburger Panther
- Playing career: 2004–present

Derek Dinger (born March 28, 1987) is a German professional ice hockey defenceman who is currently playing for EC Kassel Huskies of the DEL2.

== Playing career ==
Dinger originally joined the DEG Metro Stars for the 2010–11 season following the folding of hometown team the Kassel Huskies on September 2, 2010. After two seasons with the Stars, Dinger left to join ERC Ingolstadt on a one-year contract on May 11, 2012.

From August 2012 to May 2014 Derek Dinger played for the ERC Ingolstadt in the DEL and scored in 53 main round games one goal and five assists. At the end of the following season he won the German Championship with the ERCI.

After a solitary season with Schwenninger Wild Wings, Dinger signed a one-year contract with Augsburger Panther on April 14, 2015. In the 2016–17 season, Dinger reached the play-off quarter-finals with the Panthers.

== Career statistics ==
			Regular season					Playoffs
Season	Team	League	GP	G	A	Pts	PIM	GP	G	A	Pts	PIM
2003–04	Eisbären Juniors Berlin	4.GBun	—	—	—	—	—	6	0	4	4	0
2004–05	Eisbären Juniors Berlin	3.GBun	11	0	2	2	0	—	—	—	—	—
2005–06	Eisbären Juniors Berlin	3.GBun	36	3	12	15	30	12	1	2	3	4
2005–06	Eisbären Berlin	DEL	7	0	0	0	0	—	—	—	—	—
2006–07	Eisbären Juniors Berlin	3.GBun	40	3	21	24	34	2	0	2	2	10
2006–07	Eisbären Berlin	DEL	8	0	0	0	0	—	—	—	—	—
2007–08	Fischtown Pinguins	2.GBun	36	4	9	13	38	7	0	1	1	0
2008–09	Fischtown Pinguins	2.GBun	43	5	11	16	28	6	1	3	4	2
2009–10	Kassel Huskies	DEL	56	2	8	10	106	—	—	—	—	—
2010–11	DEG Metro Stars	DEL	45	3	2	5	30	9	0	1	1	6
2011–12	DEG Metro Stars	DEL	50	4	6	10	36	7	1	1	2	8
2012–13	ERC Ingolstadt	DEL	48	1	5	6	40	6	0	0	0	4
2013–14	ERC Ingolstadt	DEL	47	0	7	7	16	20	0	2	2	8
2014–15	Schwenninger Wild Wings	DEL	52	2	8	10	30	—	—	—	—	—
2015–16	Augsburger Panther	DEL	51	1	6	7	26	—	—	—	—	—
2016–17	Augsburger Panther	DEL	52	0	9	9	34	7	2	1	3	0
2017–18	Augsburger Panther	DEL	36	1	2	3	8	—	—	—	—	—
DEL totals			452	14	53	67	326	49	3	5	8	26
