= 2016–17 DEL season =

- League: Deutsche Eishockey Liga
- Sport: Ice hockey
- Duration: 16 September 2016–21 April 2017
- Games: 364
- Teams: 14

Regular season
- Season champions: EHC München
- Season MVP: Patrick Reimer
- Top scorer: Patrick Reimer (54 points)

Finals
- Champions: EHC München
- Runners-up: EHC Wolfsburg
- Finals MVP: Yannic Seidenberg

DEL seasons
- ← 2015–16 2017–18 →

The 2016–17 Deutsche Eishockey Liga season was the 23rd season since the founding of the Deutsche Eishockey Liga.

Hamburg Freezers did not play this season due to financial reasons. Fischtown Pinguins were given the license to play in the DEL.

Munich won their second consecutive title by defeating Wolfsburg in five games.

== Teams ==
Teams of the 2016–17 DEL season

Team	City	Arena
Augsburger Panther	Augsburg	Curt Frenzel Stadium
Eisbären Berlin	Berlin	Mercedes-Benz Arena
Fischtown Pinguins	Bremerhaven	Eisarena Bremerhaven
Düsseldorfer EG	Düsseldorf	ISS Dome
ERC Ingolstadt	Ingolstadt	Saturn Arena
Iserlohn Roosters	Iserlohn	Eissporthalle Iserlohn
Kölner Haie	Cologne	Lanxess Arena
Krefeld Pinguine	Krefeld	König Palast
Adler Mannheim	Mannheim	SAP Arena
EHC München	Munich	Olympia Eishalle
Thomas Sabo Ice Tigers	Nuremberg	Nuremberg Arena
Schwenninger Wild Wings	Villingen-Schwenningen	Helios Arena
Straubing Tigers	Straubing	Eisstadion am Pulverturm
EHC Wolfsburg	Wolfsburg	Eisarena Wolfsburg

== Regular season ==
=== Standings ===
Pos	Team	Pld	W	OTW	OTL	L	GF	GA	GD	Pts	Qualification
1	EHC München	52	31	5	4	12	188	122	+66	107	Playoffs
2	Adler Mannheim	52	30	6	4	12	183	135	+48	106	Playoffs
3	Thomas Sabo Ice Tigers	52	27	7	7	11	177	132	+45	102	Playoffs
4	Kölner Haie	52	31	1	2	18	145	109	+36	97	Playoffs
5	EHC Wolfsburg	52	25	5	6	16	153	128	+25	91	Playoffs
6	Augsburger Panther	52	23	7	4	18	155	152	+3	87	Playoffs
7	ERC Ingolstadt	52	22	2	6	22	159	157	+2	76	Pre-playoffs
8	Eisbären Berlin	52	19	2	7	24	125	148	−23	68	Pre-playoffs
9	Straubing Tigers	52	18	3	7	24	147	168	−21	67	Pre-playoffs
10	Fischtown Pinguins	52	17	5	3	27	144	162	−18	64	Pre-playoffs
11	Düsseldorfer EG	52	16	7	1	28	127	161	−34	63	
12	Schwenninger Wild Wings	52	12	9	4	27	122	156	−34	58	
13	Iserlohn Roosters	52	13	4	8	27	129	171	−42	55	
14	Krefeld Pinguine	52	11	6	6	29	120	173	−53	51	

Source: DEL
Rules for classification: 1) points; 2) head-to-head points; 3) head-to-head goal difference; 4) head-to-head number of goals scored.

=== Results ===
==== First half ====
Home \ Away	AUG	BER	BRE	DÜS	ING	ISE	KÖL	KRE	MAN	MUN	NÜR	SCH	STR	WOL
Augsburg		2–1	4–1	3–2	4–5	5–4	3–2	4–3^{(OT)}	3–2^{(OT)}	1–3	2–3	3–4^{(OT)}	5–3	3–0
Berlin	6–4		4–2	5–0	3–0	4–3	0–3	1–3	4–3	2–4	3–2^{(SO)}	1–0	5–2	2–3^{(OT)}
Bremerhaven	3–5	3–1		2–5	2–1^{(SO)}	3–1	2–5	2–5	3–5	1–3	2–1^{(OT)}	1–5	4–3	2–3
Düsseldorf	2–3	3–4	5–4		6–2	4–2	4–2	2–4	1–2	0–2	0–4	3–2^{(SO)}	4–2	0–2
Ingolstadt	2–4	4–7	2–4	5–2		3–2	4–8	4–2	2–1	5–3	3–4	4–0	4–2	2–3
Iserlohn	2–1	2–0	2–3^{(OT)}	3–1	1–5		3–2^{(SO)}	4–1	1–2	2–1	3–4^{(SO)}	3–2	4–2	1–6
Köln	3–2	4–1	0–2	1–2^{(SO)}	1–5	7–2		2–1	4–0	3–1	3–1	2–4	6–1	2–3
Krefeld	3–4^{(SO)}	3–5	1–3	2–3^{(OT)}	1–4	2–4	1–3		4–3	0–2	3–5	3–1	0–3	3–4^{(OT)}
Mannheim	5–3	3–1	4–2	4–1	0–1	5–1	0–2	4–1		3–6	3–4^{(OT)}	3–0	0–2	4–3^{(OT)}
Munich	6–2	3–2	1–2	7–1	3–2^{(SO)}	4–3	1–2	6–4	3–2		2–4	2–1^{(SO)}	5–1	4–2
Nürnberg	1–2	5–2	2–3	6–5	2–0	3–0	2–1	5–0	5–6^{(OT)}	6–5^{(OT)}		5–2	3–4	4–2
Schwenningen	3–0	3–5	3–2^{(OT)}	1–3	5–4^{(OT)}	2–3	0–4	3–4^{(SO)}	5–4^{(SO)}	1–2	4–2		3–2	3–4
Straubing	4–5^{(OT)}	5–2	2–0	2–3^{(SO)}	3–2	1–0^{(OT)}	3–2	3–7	2–4	3–2^{(OT)}	3–4^{(OT)}	5–2		2–7
Wolfsburg	1–2	3–2^{(OT)}	5–3	3–4^{(OT)}	4–2	4–3^{(OT)}	3–5	3–0	2–4	1–5	2–1	2–1	4–1	

Legend: Blue = home team win; Yellow = draw; Red = away team win.

==== Second half ====
Home \ Away	AUG	BER	BRE	DÜS	ING	ISE	KÖL	KRE	MAN	MUN	NÜR	SCH	STR	WOL
Augsburg		2–1	3–7	4–2	2–5	4–3^{(SO)}	1–4	3–1	1–4	6–5^{(OT)}	4–0	4–1	4–3	4–3
Berlin	0–2		4–1	2–1	5–4	4–1	1–2	2–3^{(OT)}	3–2^{(OT)}	3–4	1–3	1–0	1–2^{(OT)}	2–1
Bremerhaven	4–2	4–3		1–5	1–2	6–3	6–0	3–2^{(SO)}	6–7^{(OT)}	2–3	0–3	3–4^{(OT)}	5–3	0–1
Düsseldorf	3–2^{(SO)}	0–3	4–2		1–2^{(OT)}	5–4	1–2	2–1	2–7	3–7	3–2^{(OT)}	2–3	2–5	2–0
Ingolstadt	3–4	7–1	2–3^{(SO)}	7–2		4–3	4–2	1–3	3–4	2–5	5–4	6–5^{(OT)}	5–1	6–3
Iserlohn	1–3	4–3^{(SO)}	3–1	2–6	3–2^{(SO)}		1–2^{(OT)}	7–3	3–4	5–2	2–5	4–3^{(OT)}	3–2^{(OT)}	0–4
Köln	6–1	2–0	3–2	0–2	0–1	3–2		1–4	2–4	2–1	4–2	3–1	4–2	0–1
Krefeld	5–4	3–2^{(OT)}	2–4	0–4	1–2	3–2^{(OT)}	1–3		2–5	1–4	3–4^{(OT)}	4–2	1–3	2–1^{(OT)}
Mannheim	2–1^{(OT)}	4–3^{(SO)}	4–3	7–1	4–2	5–4	4–2	6–2		3–4	3–2^{(OT)}	4–1	4–1	4–2
Munich	2–1^{(SO)}	3–1	1–3	5–2	3–2^{(OT)}	6–1	5–2	7–2	3–4		1–2	5–0	7–1	3–5
Nürnberg	3–2	6–1	6–4	5–2	2–5	5–4	3–4	6–3	5–1	3–2^{(OT)}		3–1	4–1	4–1
Schwenningen	1–6	2–1	5–1	4–1	4–1	2–1	2–5	1–3	3–7	2–6	4–3^{(SO)}		2–1^{(OT)}	1–3
Straubing	6–2	6–3	2–5	1–3	5–2	2–3	3–2	3–4^{(OT)}	4–5	6–2	8–4	1–2^{(SO)}		3–0
Wolfsburg	3–4^{(OT)}	7–1	7–6	4–1	5–2	4–2	3–6	4–0	0–1	3–4^{(OT)}	0–1^{(SO)}	2–5	3–2^{(SO)}	

Legend: Blue = home team win; Yellow = draw; Red = away team win.

== Playoffs ==
=== Bracket ===
First round
7	ERC Ingolstadt	0
10	Fischtown Pinguins	2
8	Eisbären Berlin	2
9	Straubing Tigers	0

Quarterfinals
1	EHC München	4
10	Fischtown Pinguins	0
2	Adler Mannheim	3
8	Eisbären Berlin	4
3	Thomas Sabo Ice Tigers	4
6	Augsburger Panther	3
4	Kölner Haie	3
5	EHC Wolfsburg	4

Semifinals
1	EHC München	4
8	Eisbären Berlin	1
(Pairings are re-seeded after the first and second round)
3	Thomas Sabo Ice Tigers	2
5	EHC Wolfsburg	4

Finals
1	EHC München	4
5	EHC Wolfsburg	1

=== Playoff qualification ===
The playoff qualification was played between 1 and 3 March 2017 in a best-of-three mode.

==== ERC Ingolstadt vs. Fischtown Pinguins ====
1 March	ERC Ingolstadt	1–4	Fischtown Pinguins	Saturn Arena, Ingolstadt	Recap
David Elsner – 09:10		First period	19:30 – Jeremy Welsh
No scoring		Second period	29:24 – Bronson Maschmeyer; 31:57 – Welsh
No scoring		Third period	58:55 – Jack Combs (ENG)
Timo Pielmeier (35 saves / 38 shots)		Goalie stats	Gerald Kuhn (26 saves / 27 shots)

3 March	Fischtown Pinguins	6–5	ERC Ingolstadt	Eisarena Bremerhaven, Bremerhaven	Recap
Mike Hoeffel (PP) – 05:24; Jack Combs (PP) – 19:48		First period	12:39 – John Laliberte (PP)
Jordan Owens – 33:27; Ross Mauermann – 33:53		Second period	24:18 – David Elsner; 25:59 – Björn Svensson (PP)
Owens (PP) – 41:32; Jason Bast (PP) – 46:28		Third period	40:37 – Brandon Buck (PP); 47:45 – Brian Salcido
Gerald Kuhn (29 saves / 34 shots)		Goalie stats	Timo Pielmeier (28 saves / 34 shots)

Bremerhaven won series 2–0

==== Eisbären Berlin vs. Straubing Tigers ====
1 March	Eisbären Berlin	3–1	Straubing Tigers	Mercedes-Benz Arena, Berlin	Recap
Jamie MacQueen (PP) – 11:49		First period	No scoring
No scoring		Second period	31:24 – Sean Sullivan
MacQueen – 50:37; Marcel Noebels (ENG) – 59:58		Third period	No scoring
Petri Vehanen (33 saves / 34 shots)		Goalie stats	Matt Climie (32 saves / 35 shots)

3 March	Straubing Tigers	2–3	3OT	Eisbären Berlin	Eisstadion am Pulverturm, Straubing	Recap
Sean Sullivan (PP) – 04:43; Scott Timmins (PP) – 12:00		First period		05:14 – Alexander Roach
No scoring		Second period		30:22 – Spencer Machacek (PP)
No scoring		Third period		No scoring
No scoring		Third overtime period		103:17 – Jamie MacQueen
Matt Climie (67 saves / 70 shots)		Goalie stats		Petri Vehanen (57 saves / 59 shots)

Berlin won series 2–0

=== Quarterfinals ===
The quarterfinals will be played between 7 and 21 March 2017 in a best-of-seven mode.

==== EHC München vs. Fischtown Pinguins ====
7 March	EHC München	4–1	Fischtown Pinguins	Olympia Eishalle, Munich	Recap
No scoring		First period	16:51 – Mike Hoeffel
Deron Quint – 21:58; Konrad Abeltshauser – 28:15; Michael Wolf (PP) – 34:51		Second period	No scoring
Jon Matsumoto (PS) – 49:41		Third period	No scoring
Danny aus den Birken (22 saves / 23 shots)		Goalie stats	Gerald Kuhn (44 saves / 48 shots)

10 March	Fischtown Pinguins	0–3	EHC München	Eisarena Bremerhaven, Bremerhaven	Recap
No scoring		First period	05:06 – Yannic Seidenberg (PP); 16:35 – Frank Mauer
No scoring		Second period	No scoring
No scoring		Third period	53:49 – Konrad Abeltshauser
Gerald Kuhn (34 saves / 37 shots)		Goalie stats	Danny aus den Birken (22 saves / 22 shots)

12 March	EHC München	3–2	Fischtown Pinguins	Olympia Eishalle, Munich	Recap
Derek Joslin (PP) – 11:38		First period	01:26 – Cody Lampl
Keith Aucoin – 26:48		Second period	No scoring
Aucoin (SH) – 45:24		Third period	41:49 – Jeremy Welsh
Danny aus den Birken (20 saves / 22 shots)		Goalie stats	Jani Nieminen (39 saves / 42 shots)

15 March	Fischtown Pinguins	2–8	EHC München	Eisarena Bremerhaven, Bremerhaven	Recap
Jack Combs – 14:29		First period	03:37 – Jonathan Matsumoto (PP); 12:14 – Jerome Flaake
No scoring		Second period	26:19 – Matsumoto (PP); 34:30 – Frank Mauer; 35:12 – Derek Joslin (PP); 38:46 – Mads Christensen
Mike Moore – 48:36		Third period	49:14 – Daryl Boyle; 58:09 – Yannic Seidenberg
Jani Nieminen (15 saves / 21 shots)		Goalie stats	Danny aus den Birken (14 saves / 15 shots)

Munich won series 4–0

==== Adler Mannheim vs. Eisbären Berlin ====
7 March	Adler Mannheim	4–3	OT	Eisbären Berlin	SAP Arena, Mannheim	Recap
No scoring		First period		01:06 – Jamie MacQueen
Matthias Plachta (PP) – 24:17; Plachta – 36:46		Second period		No scoring
Plachta – 59:56		Third period		43:50 – Charles Linglet (PP2); 50:48 – Julian Talbot
Plachta – 60:20		First overtime period		No scoring
Dennis Endras (22 saves / 25 shots)		Goalie stats		Petri Vehanen (37 saves / 41 shots)

10 March	Eisbären Berlin	6–3	Adler Mannheim	Mercedes-Benz Arena, Berlin	Recap
Darin Olver – 13:07; Nick Petersen – 17:11		First period	00:57 – Luke Adam; 16:06 – Ronny Arendt
Olver – 25:07		Second period	37:41 – Matthias Plachta
Daniel Fischbuch – 48:32; Julian Talbot – 58:21; Talbot (ENG) – 59:21		Third period	No scoring
Petri Vehanen (24 saves / 27 shots)		Goalie stats	Drew MacIntyre (30 saves / 36 shots)

12 March	Adler Mannheim	3–2	Eisbären Berlin	SAP Arena, Mannheim	Recap
Brent Raedeke – 05:26; Chad Kolarik (PP) – 18:32		First period	11:28 – Louis-Marc Aubry
Luke Adam – 27:03		Second period	No scoring
No scoring		Third period	53:19 – Florian Busch
Dennis Endras (20 saves / 22 shots)		Goalie stats	Petri Vehanen (39 saves / 42 shots)

15 March	Eisbären Berlin	6–1	Adler Mannheim	Mercedes-Benz Arena, Berlin	Recap
Charles Linglet – 17:22		First period	16:53 – Ryan MacMurchy (PP)
Louis-Marc Aubry – 25:55; André Rankel – 28:12; Laurin Braun – 36:37		Second period	No scoring
Braun – 45:24; Darin Olver – 55:47		Third period	No scoring
Petri Vehanen (21 saves / 22 shots)		Goalie stats	Dennis Endras (27 saves / 33 shots)

17 March	Adler Mannheim	3–1	Eisbären Berlin	SAP Arena, Mannheim	Recap
No scoring		First period	No scoring
No scoring		Second period	No scoring
Luke Adam – 45:48; Garrett Festerling – 49:52; Carlo Colaiacovo (ENG) – 59:16		Third period	Julian Talbot – 53:40
Drew MacIntyre (14 saves / 15 shots)		Goalie stats	Petri Vehanen (23 saves / 26 shots)

19 March	Eisbären Berlin	4–3	3OT	Adler Mannheim	Mercedes-Benz Arena, Berlin	Recap
Nick Petersen (PS) – 02:16; Marcel Noebels (PP) – 06:24; Petersen (PP2) – 09:33		First period		No scoring
No scoring		Second period		28:58 – Chad Kolarik (PP); 30:46 – Matthias Plachta
No scoring		Third period		52:15 – Plachta (PP)
Noebels (PP) – 100:29		Third overtime period		No scoring
Petri Vehanen (40 saves / 43 shots)		Goalie stats		Drew MacIntyre (40 saves / 44 shots)

21 March	Adler Mannheim	1–2	OT	Eisbären Berlin	SAP Arena, Mannheim	Recap
No scoring		First period		No scoring
No scoring		Second period		No scoring
Marcus Kink – 41:11		Third period		47:10 – Barry Tallackson
No scoring		First overtime period		69:32 – Charles Linglet
Drew MacIntyre (15 saves / 16 shots)		Goalie stats		Petri Vehanen (48 saves / 49 shots)

Berlin won series 4–3

==== Thomas Sabo Ice Tigers vs. Augsburger Panther ====
8 March	Thomas Sabo Ice Tigers	1–4	Augsburger Panther	Nuremberg Arena, Nuremberg	Recap
Steven Reinprecht – 05:12		First period	15:52 – Trevor Parkes (PP2)
No scoring		Second period	27:33 – T. J. Trevelyan
No scoring		Third period	58:38 – Ben Hanowski (PP2); 59:47 – Aleksander Polaczek (PP, ENG)
Andreas Jenike (29 saves / 33 shots)		Goalie stats	Jonathan Boutin (32 saves / 33 shots)

10 March	Augsburger Panther	1–3	Thomas Sabo Ice Tigers	Curt Frenzel Stadium, Augsburg	Recap
No scoring		First period	02:34 – Steven Reinprecht (PP)
No scoring		Second period	34:11 – Nichlas Torp; 35:47 – Brandon Segal
Ben Hanowski (PP) – 41:32		Third period	No scoring
Jonathan Boutin (25 saves / 28 shots)		Goalie stats	Andreas Jenike (25 saves / 26 shots)

12 March	Thomas Sabo Ice Tigers	5–3	Augsburger Panther	Nuremberg Arena, Nuremberg	Recap
Brandon Segal – 03:58; Patrick Reimer – 08:51; Steven Reinprecht – 10:20		First period	04:54 – Scott Valentine; 11:02 – Andrew LeBlanc
No scoring		Second period	24:12 – Adrian Grygiel
Marco Pfleger – 50:46; P. Reimer – 56:48		Third period	No scoring
Jochen Reimer (36 saves / 39 shots)		Goalie stats	Jonathan Boutin (21 saves / 26 shots)

14 March	Augsburger Panther	4–0	Thomas Sabo Ice Tigers	Curt Frenzel Stadium, Augsburg	Recap
Derek Dinger – 11:51		First period	No scoring
Derek Dinger – 21:29; Jaroslav Hafenrichter – 36:47		Second period	No scoring
Ben Hanowski (PP) – 46:03		Third period	No scoring
Ben Meisner (30 saves / 30 shots)		Goalie stats	Andreas Jenike (30 saves / 34 shots)

17 March	Thomas Sabo Ice Tigers	1–5	Augsburger Panther	Nuremberg Arena, Nuremberg	Recap
No scoring		First period	08:34 – Justin Shugg; 14:24 – Braden Lamb; 16:26 – Trevor Parkes (PP)
No scoring		Second period	23:17 – Trevor Parkes (PP)
Philippe Dupuis – 57:54		Third period	46:38– Lamb (PP)
Andreas Jenike (8 saves / 13 shots)		Goalie stats	Ben Meisner (42 saves / 43 shots)

19 March	Augsburger Panther	0–3	Thomas Sabo Ice Tigers	Curt Frenzel Stadium, Augsburg	Recap
No scoring		First period	No scoring
No scoring		Second period	Yasin Ehliz – 32:37
No scoring		Third period	Ehliz (PS) – 57:13; David Steckel (ENG) – 58:59
Ben Meisner (30 saves / 33 shots)		Goalie stats	Jochen Reimer (20 saves / 20 shots)

21 March	Thomas Sabo Ice Tigers	5–3	Augsburger Panther	Nuremberg Arena, Nuremberg	Recap
Yasin Ehliz – 08:47		First period	08:11 – David Stieler
Jesse Blacker – 33:20; Patrick Reimer (PP) – 35:10		Second period	No scoring
Marco Pfleger – 40:16; Marius Möchel – 52:19		Third period	49:06 – Justin Shugg; 49:57 – Thomas Holzmann
Jochen Reimer (26 saves / 29 shots)		Goalie stats	Ben Meisner (33 saves / 38 shots)

Nuremberg won series 4–3

==== Kölner Haie vs. EHC Wolfsburg ====
7 March	Kölner Haie	2–1	OT	EHC Wolfsburg	Lanxess Arena, Cologne	Recap
Shawn Lalonde (PP) – 13:11		First period		No scoring
No scoring		Second period		24:03 – Jeremy Dehner (PP)
No scoring		Third period		No scoring
Alexandre Bolduc (SH) – 61:08		First overtime period		No scoring
Gustaf Wesslau (25 saves / 26 shots)		Goalie stats		Felix Brueckmann (35 saves / 37 shots)

10 March	EHC Wolfsburg	3–1	Kölner Haie	Eisarena Wolfsburg, Wolfsburg	Recap
Brent Aubin (PP) – 07:05		First period	14:02 – Shawn Lalonde
Mark Voakes – 23:49; Tyson Mulock (PP) – 30:30		Second period	No scoring
No scoring		Third period	No scoring
Felix Brueckmann (31 saves / 32 shots)		Goalie stats	Gustaf Wesslau (29 saves / 32 shots)

12 March	Kölner Haie	0–4	EHC Wolfsburg	Lanxess Arena, Cologne	Recap
No scoring		First period	06:43 – Sebastian Furchner (PP); 08:11 – Tyson Mulock (PP)
No scoring		Second period	28:21 – Björn Krupp; 36:23 – Gerrit Fauser (PP)
No scoring		Third period	No scoring
Gustaf Wesslau (19 saves / 23 shots)		Goalie stats	Felix Brueckmann (21 saves / 21 shots)

15 March	EHC Wolfsburg	5–1	Kölner Haie	Eisarena Wolfsburg, Wolfsburg	Recap
Nick Johnson – 05:03		First period	No scoring
Brent Aubin – 23:31		Second period	No scoring
Mark Voakes – 46:16; Fabio Pfohl – 50:09; Gerrit Fauser – 50:23		Third period	58:01 – Christian Ehrhoff
Felix Brueckmann (25 saves / 26 shots)		Goalie stats	Gustaf Wesslau (20 saves / 25 shots)

17 March	Kölner Haie	3–1	EHC Wolfsburg	Lanxess Arena, Cologne	Recap
No scoring		First period	12:26 – Gerrit Fauser
Shawn Lalonde (PP) – 33:49; Travis Turnbull (PP) – 39:33		Second period	No scoring
Kai Hospelt (ENG) – 59:20		Third period	No scoring
Gustaf Wesslau (24 saves / 25 shots)		Goalie stats	Felix Brueckmann (30 saves / 33 shots)

19 March	EHC Wolfsburg	0–1	Kölner Haie	Eisarena Wolfsburg, Wolfsburg	Recap
No scoring		First period	No scoring
No scoring		Second period	No scoring
No scoring		Third period	55:09 – Shawn Lalonde (PP2)
Felix Brueckmann (23 saves / 24 shots)		Goalie stats	Gustaf Wesslau (19 saves / 19 shots)

21 March	Kölner Haie	0–1	EHC Wolfsburg	Lanxess Arena, Cologne	Recap
No scoring		First period	No scoring
No scoring		Second period	27:17 – Tyson Mulock
No scoring		Third period	No scoring
Gustaf Wesslau (20 saves / 21 shots)		Goalie stats	Felix Brueckmann (36 saves / 36 shots)

Wolfsburg won series 4–3

=== Semifinals ===
The semifinals were played between 24 March and 4 April 2017 in a best-of-seven mode.

==== EHC München vs. Eisbären Berlin ====
24 March	EHC München	2–3	2OT	Eisbären Berlin	Olympia Eishalle, Munich	Recap
No scoring		First period		No scoring
Brooks Macek – 21:11; Macek – 34:56		Second period		36:30 – Bruno Gervais; 37:17 – André Rankel
No scoring		Third period		No scoring
No scoring		Second overtime period		84:27 – Rankel (PP)
Danny aus den Birken (34 saves / 37 shots)		Goalie stats		Petri Vehanen (46 saves / 48 shots)

26 March	Eisbären Berlin	1–2	EHC München	Mercedes-Benz Arena, Berlin	Recap
Julian Talbot – 08:35		First period	No scoring
No scoring		Second period	27:15 – Keith Aucoin; 29:27 – Jason Jaffray
No scoring		Third period	No scoring
Petri Vehanen (22 saves / 24 shots)		Goalie stats	Danny aus den Birken (18 saves / 19 shots)

28 March	EHC München	5–1	Eisbären Berlin	Olympia Eishalle, Munich	Recap
Michael Wolf (PP) – 05:49; Steve Pinizzotto – 10:03; Dominik Kahun – 14:39		First period	No scoring
Wolf (PP) – 29:14		Second period	No scoring
Brooks Macek (SH) – 36:39		Third period	46:17 – Laurin Braun
Danny aus den Birken (20 saves / 21 shots)		Goalie stats	Petri Vehanen (49 saves / 54 shots)

31 March	Eisbären Berlin	1–3	EHC München	Mercedes-Benz Arena, Berlin	Recap
Jonas Müller – 16:22		First period	No scoring
No scoring		Second period	35:33 – Jon Matsumoto; 38:52 – Derek Joslin
No scoring		Third period	59:42 – Steve Pinizzotto (ENG)
Petri Vehanen (27 saves / 30 shots)		Goalie stats	Danny aus den Birken (25 saves / 26 shots)

2 April	EHC München	2–1	OT	Eisbären Berlin	Olympia Eishalle, Munich	Recap
No scoring		First period		38:52 – Derek Joslin
Laurin Braun – 13:45		Second period		No scoring
No scoring		Third period		No scoring
Michael Wolf (PP) – 71:16		First overtime period		No scoring
Danny aus den Birken (45 saves / 46 shots)		Goalie stats		Petri Vehanen (42 saves / 44 shots)

Munich won series 4–1

==== Thomas Sabo Ice Tigers vs. EHC Wolfsburg ====
24 March	Thomas Sabo Ice Tigers	5–1	EHC Wolfsburg	Nuremberg Arena, Nuremberg	Recap
Yasin Ehliz (PP) – 16:07		First period	No scoring
No scoring		Second period	No scoring
Patrick Reimer (PP) – 43:26; Brandon Segal (PP) – 50:44; Brandon Prust – 52:55; Rob Schremp (PP) – 56:04		Third period	40:23 – Tyler Haskins (PP)
Jochen Reimer (28 saves / 29 shots)		Goalie stats	Felix Brueckmann (30 saves / 35 shots)

26 March	EHC Wolfsburg	5–3	Thomas Sabo Ice Tigers	Eisarena Wolfsburg, Wolfsburg	Recap
Brent Aubin (PP) – 05:39; Gerrit Fauser (PP) – 11:20; Fauser – 12:34		First period	No scoring
No scoring		Second period	28:00 – Yasin Ehliz (PP); 31:49 – Philippe Dupuis (PP)
Aubin – 58:19; Nick Johnson (ENG) – 59:27		Third period	41:21 – Patrick Reimer (PP)
Felix Brueckmann (34 saves / 37 shots)		Goalie stats	Jochen Reimer (22 saves / 27 shots)

29 March	Thomas Sabo Ice Tigers	3–4	OT	EHC Wolfsburg	Nuremberg Arena, Nuremberg	Recap
Brandon Prust – 04:38; Oliver Mebus – 15:48		First period		12:07 – Sebastian Furchner
Rob Schremp – 32:17		Second period		No scoring
No scoring		Third period		44:53 – Nick Johnson; 59:05 – Gerrit Fauser (EA)
No scoring		First overtime period		76:42 – Tyler Haskins
Jochen Reimer (29 saves / 33 shots)		Goalie stats		Felix Brueckmann (38 saves / 41 shots)

31 March	EHC Wolfsburg	4–3	Thomas Sabo Ice Tigers	Eisarena Wolfsburg, Wolfsburg	Recap
Brent Aubin – 14:08		First period	No scoring
Tyler Haskins – 24:19; Alexander Karachun – 36:39		Second period	37:19 – Philippe Dupuis; 37:48 – Brandon Segal
Robert Bina – 49:25		Third period	52:59 – Rob Schremp (PP)
Felix Brueckmann (24 saves / 27 shots)		Goalie stats	Jochen Reimer (13 saves / 17 shots)

2 April	Thomas Sabo Ice Tigers	4–1	EHC Wolfsburg	Nuremberg Arena, Nuremberg	Recap
Marco Pfleger – 05:53		First period	No scoring
Pfleger – 23:36; Philippe Dupuis – 25:02		Second period	31:58 – Philip Riefers
Jesse Blacker – 40:28		Third period	No scoring
Andreas Jenike (26 saves / 27 shots)		Goalie stats	Felix Brueckmann (15 saves / 19 shots)

4 April	EHC Wolfsburg	3–0	Thomas Sabo Ice Tigers	Eisarena Wolfsburg, Wolfsburg	Recap
Sebastian Furchner – 06:14; Brent Aubin (PP) – 15:33		First period	No scoring
No scoring		Second period	No scoring
Gerrit Fauser – 36:42		Third period	No scoring
Felix Brueckmann (18 saves / 18 shots)		Goalie stats	Andreas Jenike (22 saves / 25 shots)

Wolfsburg won series 4–2

=== Final ===
The final was played between 9 and 17 April 2017 in a best-of-seven mode.

==== EHC München vs. EHC Wolfsburg ====
9 April	EHC München	3–2	2OT	EHC Wolfsburg	Olympia Eishalle, Munich	Recap
No scoring		First period		19:31 – Armin Wurm
Brooks Macek (PP) – 25:11; Yannic Seidenberg (PP) – 35:26		Second period		27:42 – Sebastian Furchner
No scoring		Third period		No scoring
Dominik Kahun – 96:12		Second overtime period		No scoring
Danny aus den Birken (24 saves / 26 shots)		Goalie stats		Felix Brueckmann (51 saves / 54 shots)

11 April	EHC Wolfsburg	2–3	EHC München	Eisarena Wolfsburg, Wolfsburg	Recap
Nick Johnson – 07:20		First period	No scoring
Johnson – 23:35		Second period	24:45 – (SH) Maximilian Kastner; 36:26 – Michael Wolf; 39:11 – Frank Mauer
No scoring		Third period	No scoring
Felix Brueckmann (20 saves / 23 shots)		Goalie stats	Danny aus den Birken (19 saves / 21 shots)

13 April	EHC München	1–2	EHC Wolfsburg	Olympia Eishalle, Munich	Recap
Keith Aucoin – 07:37		First period	No scoring
No scoring		Second period	22:12 – Stephen Dixon; 33:24 – Brent Aubin
No scoring		Third period	No scoring
Danny aus den Birken (22 saves / 24 shots)		Goalie stats	Felix Brueckmann (43 saves / 44 shots)

15 April	EHC Wolfsburg	2–7	EHC München	Eisarena Wolfsburg, Wolfsburg	Recap
Jeremy Dehner (PP) – 07:25; Brent Aubin (PP) – 10:33		First period	09:42 – Michael Wolf (SH); 15:34 – Maximilian Kastner
No scoring		Second period	21:24 – Konrad Abeltshauser; 27:22 – Wolf (PP); 27:53 – Frank Mauer (PP)
No scoring		Third period	45:44 – Jonathan Matsumoto (PP); 56:32 – Brooks Macek
Felix Brueckmann (45 saves / 52 shots)		Goalie stats	Danny aus den Birken (17 saves / 19 shots)

17 April	EHC München	4–0	EHC Wolfsburg	Olympia Eishalle, Munich	Recap
Jon Matsumoto – 18:52		First period	No scoring
Dominik Kahun (PS) – 24:11		Second period	No scoring
Derek Joslin – 46:28; Brooks Macek – 49:17		Third period	No scoring
Danny aus den Birken (26 saves / 26 shots)		Goalie stats	Felix Brueckmann (30 saves / 34 shots)

München won series 4–1
