= John Olver (ice hockey) =

Canadian ice hockey player and coach

- Born: August 3, 1958 (age 67); North Burnaby, British Columbia, Canada
- Known for: Two-time champion minor league ice hockey coach

John Olver (born August 3, 1958) is a Canadian ice hockey player and coach known for his league championship teams in the West Coast Hockey League and ECHL.

== Personal life ==
Olver's eldest son Darin played at Northern Michigan University while he coached there. Darin now plays for the ERC Ingolstadt of the DEL. Darin was drafted 36th overall in the 2004 NHL entry draft. His younger son, Mark Olver, also played hockey at Northern Michigan and most recently plays for Eisbären Berlin in Germany. His son Mark was also drafted 144th overall in the 2008 NHL entry draft by the Colorado Avalanche and played 74 NHL games in total, amassing 22 points.

== Playing career ==
A right wing, from 1975 to 1977, Olver was a member of the junior league Kelowna Buckaroos. He played college hockey at the University of Michigan for two seasons, quitting the team in November 1979 for lack of playing time. Although he was drafted in the 8th round of the 1978 NHL Amateur Draft by the Colorado Rockies, he never played at the professional level.

== Coaching career ==
Olver began his coaching career in 1981 as an assistant with the New Westminster Royals. He took his first head coaching job in 1984 with the junior league Langley Eagles (now Westside Warriors).

Olver's first professional head coaching job came in 1995 with the West Coast Hockey League Fresno Falcons. In 1997, Olver took the head coaching position with the expansion WCHL Tacoma Sabercats. Olver led the Sabercats to the league finals in both his seasons with the team, winning the WCHL championship in 1998–99.

After a year away from coaching, in 2000, Olver became head coach of his third WCHL team, the Idaho Steelheads. Olver remained with the Steelheads for five seasons, leading them to the WCHL finals in 2000-01 and 2001–02. Olver remained with the team when it moved from the WCHL to the ECHL in 2003. He coached Idaho to the ECHL Kelly Cup championship in 2004.

Since leaving the Steelheads in 2005, Olver has served as an assistant coach at Northern Michigan University, a head coach and general manager with the Bakersfield Condors' organization in the ECHL, and the head coach and general manager of the Idaho Jr. Steelheads/IceCats in the Western States Hockey League.
