= Darin Olver =

Canadian-born German ice hockey player

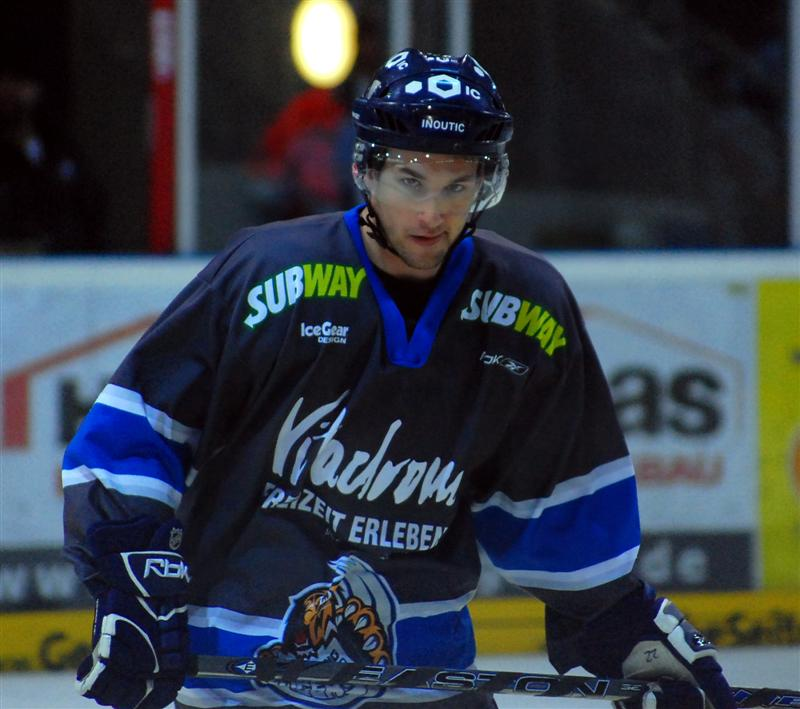
- Born: March 5, 1985 (age 41) Burnaby, British Columbia, Canada
- Height: 6 ft 0 in (183 cm)
- Weight: 176 lb (80 kg; 12 st 8 lb)
- Position: Left winger
- Shot: Left
- DEL team Former teams: Schwenninger Wild Wings; Hartford Wolf Pack; Straubing Tigers; Augsburger Panther; Eisbären Berlin; ERC Ingolstadt
- NHL draft: 36th overall, 2004; New York Rangers
- Playing career: 2007–2021

Darin Olver (born March 5, 1985) is a Canadian-born German professional ice hockey left winger. He is currently playing for Schwenninger Wild Wings of the Deutsche Eishockey Liga (DEL).

== Playing career ==
Olver played high school hockey at Eastview High School under head coach Mike Gibbons. Highly recruited out of Canada, he helped his high school team reach the Minnesota State High School Hockey Tournament in 2001. Olver played college hockey at Northern Michigan University and was a second round, 36th overall, NHL draft pick of the New York Rangers. Upon graduating from his collegiate career, Olver joined the Rangers American Hockey League affiliate, the Hartford Wolf Pack, on an amateur try-out to end the 2006–07 season.

Without an offer from the Rangers, Olver left for Germany, signing a one-year contract with the Fischtown Pinguins of the 2nd Bundesliga. Leading Fischtown with 56 points in 52 contests, Olver was picked up by DEL team, the Straubing Tigers.

With a season limited by injury and producing only 11 points, Olver left for the Augsburger Panther, signing a one-year contract on March 2, 2009. In the 2009–10 season, Olver broke out to be among the DEL leaders with 60 points, resulting in helping an unlikely Augsburg reach the finals for the first time in their DEL history and quickly earning a one-year extension on March 17, 2010.

Olver consolidated his position among the elite in Germany in the following 2010–11 season. Despite Augsburg returning to the bottom echelons of the DEL, Olver led the entire league with 47 assists and 70 points to be awarded the DEL's player of the year.

On May 2, 2011, Olver left Augsburg and signed with reigning champions Eisbären Berlin. He won back-to-back German championships with the Eisbären team in 2012 and 2013. Olver left Berlin after the conclusion of the 2016–17 season and signed with fellow DEL side ERC Ingolstadt.

After three seasons with Ingolstadt, Olver left as a free agent and was signed to a one-year contract to continue in the DEL with the Schwenninger Wild Wings on August 20, 2020.

== International play ==
Olver made his debut on the German national team during the 2010 Deutschland Cup.

== Personal ==
Olver comes from a hockey family. His father, John, played in college and coached many teams in Canada and the United States, including two years as an assistant coach for Northern Michigan University while Darin played there. His younger brother Mark Olver also played hockey at Northern Michigan and also played for the Eisbären Berlin in Germany.

Olver's maternal grandparents immigrated from Germany to Canada; he received a German passport in 2007.

== Career statistics ==
			Regular season					Playoffs
Season	Team	League	GP	G	A	Pts	PIM	GP	G	A	Pts	PIM
2000–01	Eastview High School	HSMN
2001–02	Eastview High School	HSMN
2002–03	Chilliwack Chiefs	BCHL	59	34	55	89	57	—	—	—	—	—
2003–04	Northern Michigan University	CCHA	41	13	19	32	26	—	—	—	—	—
2004–05	Northern Michigan University	CCHA	40	9	34	43	30	—	—	—	—	—
2005–06	Northern Michigan University	CCHA	36	15	20	35	32	—	—	—	—	—
2006–07	Northern Michigan University	CCHA	41	14	20	34	47	—	—	—	—	—
2006–07	Hartford Wolf Pack	AHL	6	1	0	1	8	—	—	—	—	—
2007–08	Fischtown Pinguins	GER.2	52	21	35	56	56	7	7	4	11	6
2008–09	Straubing Tigers	DEL	35	2	9	11	18	—	—	—	—	—
2009–10	Augsburger Panther	DEL	56	26	34	60	60	14	6	7	13	6
2010–11	Augsburger Panther	DEL	48	23	47	70	42	—	—	—	—	—
2011–12	Eisbären Berlin	DEL	49	24	25	49	54	13	4	10	14	6
2012–13	Eisbären Berlin	DEL	34	15	17	32	57	13	4	8	12	8
2013–14	Eisbären Berlin	DEL	51	12	25	37	40	—	—	—	—	—
2014–15	Eisbären Berlin	DEL	52	10	26	36	18	3	0	0	0	0
2015–16	Eisbären Berlin	DEL	49	14	26	40	36	7	1	0	1	18
2016–17	Eisbären Berlin	DEL	40	13	18	31	18	14	3	3	6	10
2017–18	ERC Ingolstadt	DEL	52	17	19	36	24	5	0	1	1	0
2018–19	ERC Ingolstadt	DEL	46	9	14	23	34	7	1	1	2	8
2019–20	ERC Ingolstadt	DEL	47	2	11	13	28	—	—	—	—	—
2020–21	Schwenninger Wild Wings	DEL	15	1	5	6	12	—	—	—	—	—
DEL totals			574	168	276	444	441	76	19	30	49	56
