= Mark Olver (ice hockey) =

Canadian-German ice hockey player

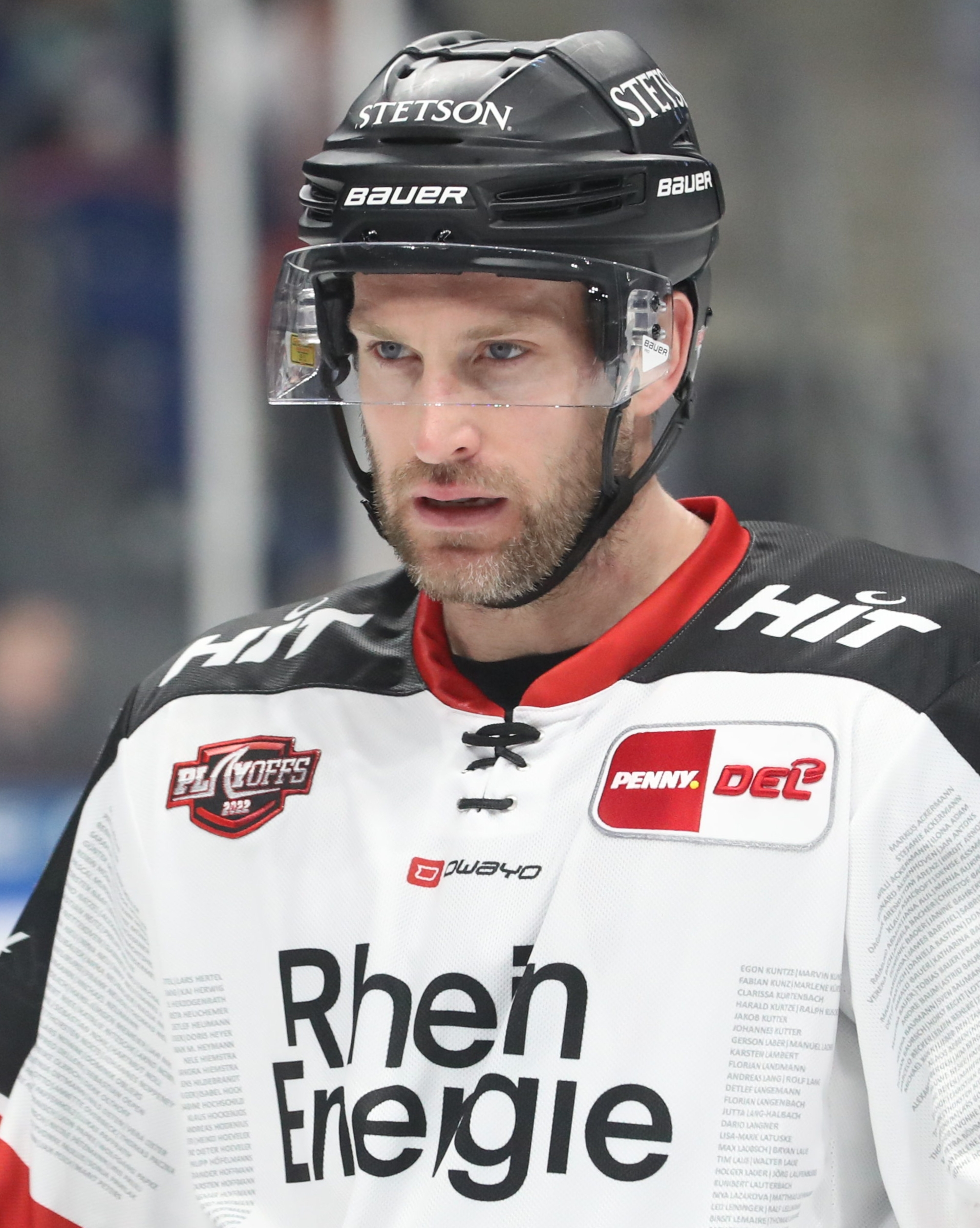
- Olver with the Kölner Haie in 2022.
- Born: January 1, 1988 (age 38) Burnaby, British Columbia, Canada
- Height: 5 ft 10 in (178 cm)
- Weight: 170 lb (77 kg; 12 st 2 lb)
- Position: Centre
- Shoots: Left
- team Former teams: Free agent Colorado Avalanche; HC Sochi; Kloten Flyers; Eisbären Berlin; Kölner Haie
- NHL draft: 144th overall, 2008; Colorado Avalanche
- Playing career: 2010–present

Mark Olver (born January 1, 1988) is a Canadian-German professional ice hockey centre who is currently an unrestricted free agent. He previously played in the National Hockey League with the Colorado Avalanche. Mark is the younger brother of Darin Olver, who was his teammate in his tenure with Eisbären Berlin.

== Playing career ==
=== Amateur ===
Olver originally played Midget AAA hockey in Michigan with the Marquette Electricians. In two seasons with the Electricians, Olver led the team in scoring in each season and in 2004–05 was named the team's Most Valuable Player. Following in the footsteps of his father John (an assistant coach) and his brother Darin, a junior at Northern Michigan University, he committed as a recruit of the Wildcats in 2005. Before he was eligible to attend college, Olver initially joined the Chilliwack Chiefs of the British Columbia Hockey League. However, on the eve of the season, Mark was controversially released by the Chiefs, under the advice of owner Morey Keith. Ultimately seen as an act of personal retribution by Keith against John Olver, Mark was then recruited to join the Omaha Lancers of the United States Hockey League.

In his second season with the Lancers in 2006–07, Olver displayed offensive potential to lead the team with 29 goals 35 assists and 64 points to earn the honour as Omaha's Forward of the Year and Most Valuable Player. Graduating from Millard North High School, Olver then joined Northern Michigan Wildcats of the Central Collegiate Hockey Association as an undersized skilled forward. As a freshman in 2007–08, Olver returned from an early season concussion to lead all NCAA Rookies in goals (21) and the Wildcats in scoring with 38 points in 39 games to be selected to the CCHA All-Rookie Team. Passed over in the two previous draft years due to size concerns, Olver was selected in the 2008 NHL entry draft by the Colorado Avalanche in the fifth round, 140th overall.

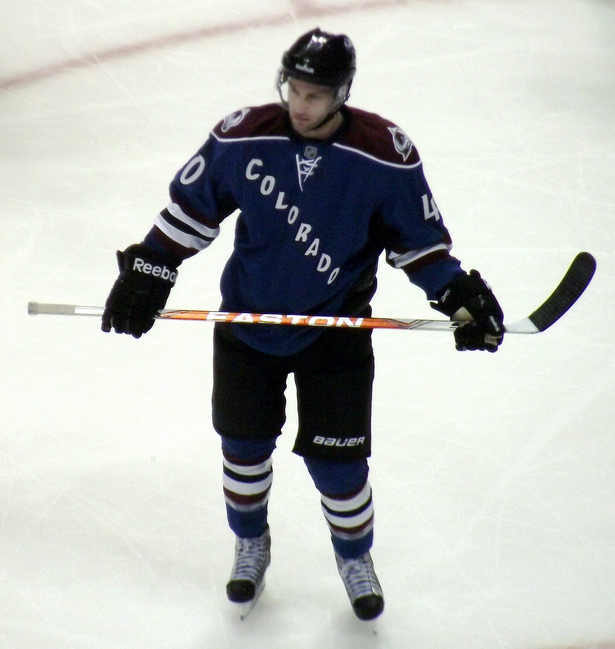
Olver with the Colorado Avalanche in 2011

Olver consolidated his offensive potential the succeeding year as sophomore, winning CCHA player of the month in January as he again led the Wildcats in scoring with 35 points in 40 games. In the 2009–10 season, as player of the month in February he helped a re-emerging NMU advance to the NCAA finals for the first time since 1999 before suffering a 4-3 defeat to St Cloud State in the West Regional semi-finals. In the wake of leading the Wildcats for a third consecutive season in scoring he was named to the CCHA First All-Star team and the NCAA West First-All American team. Mark also led the CCHA with 49 points in 40 games as a junior earning selection as a top 10 finalist in the Hobey Baker Award.

=== Professional ===
On March 30, 2010, after a three-year collegiate career with the Wildcats, Olver was signed by the Avalanche to a two-year entry-level contract. Continuing his 2009–10 season, he was immediately assigned to AHL affiliate, the Lake Erie Monsters, on an amateur try-out contract. In his professional debut, Olver scored his first pro goal in a 3-1 victory over the Peoria Rivermen on April 1, 2010. In 6 games, Olver posted 2 goals to finish the year with the Monsters.

After four seasons within the Avalanche organization, as a restricted free agent, Olver opted to sign his first European contract, agreeing to a one-year deal with the HC Sochi for their inaugural 2014–15 season in the Kontinental Hockey League on May 27, 2014. Due to injury he played only one game for HC Sochi.

On July 17, 2015, Olver left Sochi as a free agent to sign a one-year contract with Swiss club, Kloten Flyers of the National League A. Olver began the 2015–16 season with the Flyers, appearing in just 8 games and contributing 3 points before opting to terminate his contract in order to play alongside older brother Darin in Germany with Eisbären Berlin of the DEL on October 28, 2015.

After one season in Berlin, Olver opted to return to North America as a free agent. He later signed a one-year deal with the Arizona Coyotes' new AHL affiliate, the Tucson Roadrunners on August 17, 2016. In the 2016–17 season, Olver amassed 6 goals and 17 points in 41 games with the Roadrunners before he was loaned to another AHL club, the Bakersfield Condors, on March 6, 2017. He appeared in just 9 games with the Edmonton Oilers affiliate, contributing 3 assists to complete the year.

As a free agent, Olver opted for a second stint in Germany, returning to Eisbären Berlin. He agreed to a one-year deal on July 11, 2017.

Following four seasons in Berlin, Olver left as a free agent and signed a one-year deal with Kölner Haie on July 27, 2021. In the 2021–22 season, Olver added a veteran presence to the forward group and recorded 7 goals and 20 points through 42 regular season games. On April 21, 2022, he agreed to a one-year contract extension to continue with Kölner Haie.

After ten seasons abroad, Olver opted to return to North America and extend his professional career, agreeing to a contract with the Idaho Steelheads of the ECHL on September 24, 2024.

== Personal life ==
Olver holds dual citizenship, his maternal grandparents originally having emigrated from Germany to Canada.

== Career statistics ==
			Regular season					Playoffs
Season	Team	League	GP	G	A	Pts	PIM	GP	G	A	Pts	PIM
2005–06	Omaha Lancers	USHL	59	5	20	25	72	2	0	0	0	0
2006–07	Omaha Lancers	USHL	57	29	35	64	84	5	3	3	6	18
2007–08	Northern Michigan University	CCHA	39	21	17	38	59	—	—	—	—	—
2008–09	Northern Michigan University	CCHA	40	16	19	35	84	—	—	—	—	—
2009–10	Northern Michigan University	CCHA	40	19	30	49	48	—	—	—	—	—
2009–10	Lake Erie Monsters	AHL	6	2	0	2	4	—	—	—	—	—
2010–11	Colorado Avalanche	NHL	18	2	7	9	18	—	—	—	—	—
2010–11	Lake Erie Monsters	AHL	58	23	17	40	79	7	2	2	4	4
2011–12	Lake Erie Monsters	AHL	15	2	7	9	8	—	—	—	—	—
2011–12	Colorado Avalanche	NHL	24	4	3	7	15	—	—	—	—	—
2012–13	Lake Erie Monsters	AHL	36	6	16	22	34	—	—	—	—	—
2012–13	Colorado Avalanche	NHL	32	4	2	6	6	—	—	—	—	—
2013–14	Lake Erie Monsters	AHL	65	15	34	49	82	—	—	—	—	—
2014–15	HC Sochi	KHL	1	0	1	1	0	—	—	—	—	—
2015–16	Kloten Flyers	NLA	8	1	2	3	2	—	—	—	—	—
2015–16	Eisbären Berlin	DEL	36	7	9	16	75	7	1	3	4	18
2016–17	Tucson Roadrunners	AHL	41	6	11	17	29	—	—	—	—	—
2016–17	Bakersfield Condors	AHL	9	0	3	3	4	—	—	—	—	—
2017–18	Eisbären Berlin	DEL	51	14	19	33	52	18	3	6	9	22
2018–19	Eisbären Berlin	DEL	9	0	1	1	10	6	0	0	0	16
2019–20	Eisbären Berlin	DEL	45	14	19	33	18	—	—	—	—	—
2020–21	Eisbären Berlin	DEL	33	3	17	20	14	9	2	0	2	10
2021–22	Kölner Haie	DEL	42	7	13	20	39	5	0	0	0	2
2022–23	Kölner Haie	DEL	44	8	14	22	26	6	2	2	4	6
2023–24	Kölner Haie	DEL	22	1	2	3	12	—	—	—	—	—
2024–25	Idaho Steelheads	ECHL	36	3	5	8	21	—	—	—	—	—
NHL totals			74	10	12	22	39	—	—	—	—	—
DEL totals			282	54	94	148	246	51	8	11	19	74

== Awards and honours ==
Award	Year
College
All-CCHA Rookie Team	2008
All-CCHA First Team	2010
AHCA West First-Team All-American	2010
AHL
All-Star Game	2011
DEL
Champion (Eisbären Berlin)	2021
