= 2011 Calder Cup playoffs =

North American ice hockey tournament

Tournament details
- Dates: April 13 – June 7, 2011
- Teams: 16

Final positions
- Champions: Binghamton Senators
- Runners-up: Houston Aeros

Tournament statistics
- Scoring leader(s): Ryan Potulny (Senators) (26 points)

Awards
- MVP: Robin Lehner (Senators)

The 2011 Calder Cup playoffs of the American Hockey League began on April 13, 2011. The sixteen teams that qualified, eight from each conference, played best-of-seven series for division semifinals, finals and conference finals. Then the Eastern Conference Champion Binghamton Senators defeated the Western Conference Champion Houston Aeros four games to two to win the Calder Cup, the first one in Binghamton franchise history.

== Playoff seeds ==
After the 2010–11 AHL regular season, 16 teams qualified for the playoffs. The top eight teams from each conference qualified for the playoffs.

=== Eastern Conference ===
==== Atlantic Division ====
1. Portland Pirates – 103 points
2. Manchester Monarchs – 98 points
3. Connecticut Whale – 88 points

==== East Division ====
1. Wilkes-Barre/Scranton Penguins – 117 points
2. Hershey Bears – 100 points
3. Charlotte Checkers – 97 points
4. Norfolk Admirals – 93 points
5. Binghamton Senators – 92 points

=== Western Conference ===
==== North Division ====
1. Hamilton Bulldogs – 97 points
2. Lake Erie Monsters – 96 points
3. Manitoba Moose – 93 points

==== West Division ====
1. Milwaukee Admirals – 102 points
2. Houston Aeros – 98 points
3. Peoria Rivermen – 92 points (36 Regulation/Overtime Wins)
4. Texas Stars – 92 points (35 Regulation/Overtime Wins)
5. Oklahoma City Barons – 91 points

=== Bracket ===
Division semifinals	Division finals
A1	Portland	4
A3	Connecticut	2
A1	Portland	2
Atlantic Division
E5	Binghamton	4
A2	Manchester	3
E5	Binghamton	4
Eastern Conference
E1	Wilkes-Barre/Scranton	4
E4	Norfolk	2
E1	Wilkes-Barre/Scranton	2
East Division
E3	Charlotte	4
E2	Hershey	2
E3	Charlotte	4
N1	Hamilton	4
W5	Oklahoma City	2
N1	Hamilton	4
North Division
N3	Manitoba	3
N2	Lake Erie	3
N3	Manitoba	4
Western Conference
W1	Milwaukee	4
W4	Texas	2
W1	Milwaukee	3
West Division
W2	Houston	4
W2	Houston	4
W3	Peoria	0

Conference finals
E5	Binghamton	4
E3	Charlotte	0
N1	Hamilton	3
W2	Houston	4

Calder Cup final
E5	Binghamton	4
W2	Houston	2

In each round the team that earned more points during the regular season receives home ice advantage, meaning they receive the "extra" game on home-ice if the series reaches the maximum number of games. There is no set series format due to arena scheduling conflicts and travel considerations.

== Division semifinals ==
Note 1: All times are in Eastern Time (UTC-4).
Note 2: Game times in italics signify games to be played only if necessary.
Note 3: Home team is listed first.

=== Eastern Conference ===
==== Atlantic Division ====
===== (A1) Portland Pirates vs. (A3) Connecticut Whale =====
April 14	Portland Pirates	3 – 2	Connecticut Whale	Cumberland County Civic Center	Recap
Luke Adam 1 - pp - 13:47; Corey Tropp 1 - 14:45; Colin Stuart 1 - pp - 16:40		First period	No scoring
No scoring		Second period	5:13 - Blake Parlett 1
No scoring		Third period	13:03 - Dale Weise 1
David Leggio 23 saves / 25 shots		Goalie stats	Dov Grumet-Morris 20 saves / 23 shots

April 16	Portland Pirates	3 – 2	OT	Connecticut Whale	Cumberland County Civic Center	Recap
Matt Ellis 1 - 5:02		First period		15:26 - Francis Lemieux 1; 16:42 - pp - John Mitchell 1
No scoring		Second period		No scoring
Derek Whitmore 1 - 12:20		Third period		No scoring
Derek Whitmore 2 - 12:04		First overtime period		No scoring
David Leggio 23 saves / 25 shots		Goalie stats		Dov Grumet-Morris 33 saves / 36 shots

April 17	Connecticut Whale	3 – 1	Portland Pirates	XL Center	Recap
Tommy Grant 1 - 3:03		First period	19:07 - Mark Voakes 1
Derek Couture 1 - 16:23		Second period	No scoring
John Mitchell 2 - pp - 9:22		Third period	No scoring
Dov Grumet-Morris 29 saves / 30 shots		Goalie stats	David Leggio 19 saves / 22 shots

April 19	Connecticut Whale	3 – 1	Portland Pirates	XL Center	Recap
Chad Kolarik 1 - pp - 16:32		First period	No scoring
John Mitchell 3 - 4:45		Second period	No scoring
Mats Zuccarello 1 - 4:48		Third period	12:23 - Mark Voakes 2
Dov Grumet-Morris 19 saves / 20 shots		Goalie stats	David Leggio 27 saves / 30 shots

April 21	Portland Pirates	5 – 4	Connecticut Whale	Cumberland County Civic Center	Recap
Mark Mancari 1 - pp - 11:28; Travis Turnbull 1 - 17:47		First period	No scoring
Luke Adam 2 - 0:45; Dennis McCauley 1 - 9:03		Second period	4:28 - pp - Kris Newbury 1; 9:24 - Kris Newbury 2; 12:03 - pp - Chad Kolarik 2
Mark Parrish 1 - pp - 2:44		Third period	1:36 - Brodie Dupont 1
David Leggio 34 saves / 38 shots		Goalie stats	Dov Grumet-Morris 13 saves / 16 shots Cameron Talbot 22 saves / 24 shots

April 23	Connecticut Whale	4 – 6	Portland Pirates	XL Center	Recap
Jeremy Williams 1 - pp - 3:45; Dale Weise 2 - pp - 18:42		First period	No scoring
Carl Hagelin 1 - 10:47		Second period	2:00 - pp - Paul Byron 1; 4:05 - Mark Parrish 2; 9:25 - Mark Mancari 2; 17:08 - Alex Biega 1
Chad Kolarik 3 - pp - 19:43		Third period	10:56 - Paul Byron 2; 14:14 - Corey Tropp 2
Dov Grumet-Morris 24 saves / 30 shots		Goalie stats	David Leggio 30 saves / 34 shots

Portland won series 4–2

===== (A2) Manchester Monarchs vs. (E5) Binghamton Senators =====
April 14	Manchester Monarchs	2 – 1	Binghamton Senators	Verizon Wireless Arena	Recap
No scoring		First period	No scoring
Corey Elkins 1 - 2:19		Second period	No scoring
David Kolomatis 1 - pp - 16:25		Third period	19:21 - Ryan Potulny 1
Jeff Zatkoff 34 saves / 35 shots		Goalie stats	Barry Brust 27 saves / 29 shots

April 15	Manchester Monarchs	3 – 4	OT	Binghamton Senators	Verizon Wireless Arena	Recap
No scoring		First period		No scoring
Tyler Toffoli 1 - pp - 2:16; Justin Azevedo 1 - 9:09		Second period		No scoring
Jake Muzzin 1 - 18:58		Third period		1:07 - Ryan Potulny 2; 5:22 - Ryan Keller 1; 8:59 - pp - Kaspars Daugavins 1
No scoring		First overtime period		4:03 - Derek Grant 1
Jeff Zatkoff 25 saves / 29 shots		Goalie stats		Barry Brust 26 saves / 29 shots

April 17	Binghamton Senators	4 – 5	OT	Manchester Monarchs	Broome County Veterans Memorial Arena	Recap
Andre Benoit 1 - 3:28; Roman Wick 1 - pp - 12:36; Colin Greening 1 - 18:24		First period		No scoring
No scoring		Second period		10:50 - Bud Holloway 1; 17:16 - Bud Holloway 2
Bobby Butler 1 - pp - 7:44		Third period		9:15 - pp - Jake Muzzin 2; 11:50 - Dwight King 1
No scoring		First overtime period		1:43 - Bud Holloway 3
Barry Brust 27 saves / 32 shots		Goalie stats		Jeff Zatkoff 15 saves / 18 shots Martin Jones 14 saves / 15 shots

April 19	Binghamton Senators	3 – 6	Manchester Monarchs	Broome County Veterans Memorial Arena	Recap
No scoring		First period	10:01 - pp - Vyacheslav Voynov 1
Ryan Potulny 3 - 2:56; Ryan Potulny 4 - 3:57		Second period	1:50 - David Kolomatis 2
Ryan Potulny 5 - 9:34		Third period	7:05 - Brayden Schenn 1; 13:56 - sh - Justin Azevedo 2; 15:36 - David Meckler 1; 17:26 - pp - Corey Elkins 2
Barry Brust 20 saves / 26 shots		Goalie stats	Martin Jones 35 saves / 38 shots

April 20	Binghamton Senators	5 – 4	OT	Manchester Monarchs	Broome County Veterans Memorial Arena	Recap
Cody Bass 1 - 5:52		First period		16:14 - pp - Vyacheslav Voynov 2; 18:24 - Ray Kaunisto 1
Bobby Butler 2 - 5:32		Second period		17:00 - Ray Kaunisto 2
Ryan Potulny 6 - pp - 3:08; Ryan Potulny 7 - pp - 15:26		Third period		5:03 - David Meckler 2
Kaspars Daugavins 2 - pp - 6:38		First overtime period		No scoring
Robin Lehner 30 saves / 34 shots		Goalie stats		Jeff Zatkoff 37 saves / 42 shots

April 22	Manchester Monarchs	1 – 2	2OT	Binghamton Senators	Verizon Wireless Arena	Recap
No scoring		First period		No scoring
Justin Azevedo 3 - 9:02		Second period		No scoring
No scoring		Third period		10:26 - Bobby Butler 3
No scoring		Second overtime period		10:01 - Geoff Kinrade 1
Martin Jones 43 saves / 45 shots		Goalie stats		Robin Lehner 51 saves / 52 shots

April 23	Manchester Monarchs	5 – 6	OT	Binghamton Senators	Verizon Wireless Arena	Recap
No scoring		First period		13:57 - Ryan Keller 2; 16:41 - Ryan Keller 3
Bud Holloway 4 - pp - 5:11; Jake Muzzin 3 - 11:53; Brandon Kozun 1 - 17:43; John Zeiler 1 - 18:16		Second period		0:56 - sh - Erik Condra 1; 6:05 - Bobby Butler 4
Dwight King 2 - pp - 10:19		Third period		18:15 - Erik Condra 2
No scoring		First overtime period		3:07 - Ryan Potulny 8
Martin Jones 13 saves / 16 shots Jeff Zatkoff 20 saves / 23 shots		Goalie stats		Robin Lehner 32 saves / 37 shots

Binghamton won series 4–3

==== East Division ====
===== (E1) Wilkes-Barre/Scranton Penguins vs. (E4) Norfolk Admirals =====
April 15	Wilkes-Barre/Scranton Penguins	1 – 2	Norfolk Admirals	Mohegan Sun Arena at Casey Plaza	Recap
No scoring		First period	No scoring
No scoring		Second period	5:23 - Mattias Ritola 1; 18:27 - Marc-Antoine Pouliot 1
Keven Veilleux 1 - 17:13		Third period	No scoring
Brad Thiessen 20 saves / 22 shots		Goalie stats	Dustin Tokarski 32 saves / 33 shots

April 16	Wilkes-Barre/Scranton Penguins	0 – 2	Norfolk Admirals	Mohegan Sun Arena at Casey Plaza	Recap
No scoring		First period	No scoring
No scoring		Second period	19:52 - Paul Szczechura 1
No scoring		Third period	19:56 - en - Marc-Antoine Pouliot 2
Brad Thiessen 25 saves / 26 shots		Goalie stats	Dustin Tokarski 27 saves / 27 shots

April 19	Norfolk Admirals	1 – 2	Wilkes-Barre/Scranton Penguins	Norfolk Scope	Recap
No scoring		First period	17:58 - Keven Veilleux 2
Stefano Giliati 1 - pp - 15:40		Second period	No scoring
No scoring		Third period	10:20 - pp - Bryan Lerg 1
Dustin Tokarski 23 saves / 25 shots		Goalie stats	Brad Thiessen 28 saves / 29 shots

April 20	Norfolk Admirals	2 – 4	Wilkes-Barre/Scranton Penguins	Norfolk Scope	Recap
Johan Harju 1 - 16:04		First period	4:48 - Corey Potter 1
Marc-Antoine Pouliot 3 - 13:25		Second period	2:38 - Brian Strait 1; 18:17 - pp - Ryan Craig 1
No scoring		Third period	15:38 - Joe Vitale 1
Dustin Tokarski 29 saves / 33 shots		Goalie stats	Brad Thiessen 34 saves / 36 shots

April 22	Norfolk Admirals	1 – 2	Wilkes-Barre/Scranton Penguins	Norfolk Scope	Recap
No scoring		First period	8:06 - pp - Nick Petersen 1; 19:13 - pp - Nick Petersen 2
No scoring		Second period	No scoring
Mark Barberio 1 - pp - 9:45		Third period	No scoring
Dustin Tokarski 23 saves / 25 shots		Goalie stats	Brad Thiessen 23 saves / 24 shots

April 23	Wilkes-Barre/Scranton Penguins	6 – 3	Norfolk Admirals	Mohegan Sun Arena at Casey Plaza	Recap
Steve Wagner 1 - pp - 2:13; Steve Wagner 2 - pp - 3:58; Steve Wagner 3 - 18:36		First period	No scoring
No scoring		Second period	14:18 - Marc-Antoine Pouliot 4; 16:03 - pp - Blair Jones 1
Joe Vitale 2 - 7:23; Tim Wallace 1 - en - 18:57; Zach Sill 1 - en - 19:21		Third period	10:35 - pp - James Wright 1
Brad Thiessen 28 saves / 31 shots		Goalie stats	Dustin Tokarski 23 saves / 27 shots

Wilkes-Barre/Scranton won series 4–2

===== (E2) Hershey Bears vs. (E3) Charlotte Checkers =====
April 14	Hershey Bears	4 – 5	Charlotte Checkers	Giant Center	Recap
Steve Pinizzotto 1 - 1:10; Keith Aucoin 1 - pp - 16:34		First period	3:58 - Zac Dalpe 1; 6:07 - Chris Terry 1
Boyd Kane 1 - 13:11		Second period	8:15 - sh - Brett Bellemore 1
Brian Willsie 1 - 1:42		Third period	8:40 - Zach Boychuk 1; 10:38 - Drayson Bowman 1
Braden Holtby 23 saves / 28 shots		Goalie stats	Justin Pogge 27 saves / 31 shots

April 17	Hershey Bears	4 – 2	Charlotte Checkers	Giant Center	Recap
Patrick McNeill 1 - 12:02		First period	No scoring
Andrew Kozek 1 - 4:25; Brian Willsie 2 - 7:08; Sheldon Souray 1 - sh - 17:05		Second period	5:00 - Zac Dalpe 2; 11:09 - pp - Zac Dalpe 3
No scoring		Third period	No scoring
Braden Holtby 22 saves / 24 shots		Goalie stats	Justin Pogge 16 saves / 20 shots

April 19	Charlotte Checkers	2 – 3	Hershey Bears	Time Warner Cable Arena	Recap
No scoring		First period	8:44 - Francois Bouchard 1; 14:50 - Keith Aucoin 2; 18:48 - Kyle Greentree 1
Nick Dodge 1 - 5:20		Second period	No scoring
Zach Boychuk 2 - 2:21		Third period	No scoring
Mike Murphy 20 saves / 23 shots		Goalie stats	Braden Holtby 28 saves / 30 shots

April 20	Charlotte Checkers	3 – 2	Hershey Bears	Time Warner Cable Arena	Recap
No scoring		First period	No scoring
Nicolas Blanchard 1 - pp - 3:03		Second period	11:10 - Mathieu Perreault 1
Oskar Osala 1 - pp - 6:29; Nick Dodge 2 - 17:21		Third period	18:00 - Mathieu Perreault 2
Mike Murphy 35 saves / 37 shots		Goalie stats	Braden Holtby 21 saves / 24 shots

April 22	Charlotte Checkers	5 – 3	Hershey Bears	Time Warner Cable Arena	Recap
No scoring		First period	3:06 - Steve Pinizzotto 2
Brett Sutter 1 - 17:14		Second period	1:49 - Mathieu Perreault 3; 12:57 - Andrew Carroll 1
Zach Boychuk 3 - pp - 1:00; Oskar Osala 2 - 5:48; Nick Dodge 3 - 11:24; Drayson Bowman 2 - en - 19:00		Third period	No scoring
Mike Murphy 32 saves / 35 shots		Goalie stats	Braden Holtby 29 saves / 33 shots

April 24	Hershey Bears	1 – 2	OT	Charlotte Checkers	Giant Center	Recap
No scoring		First period		0:35 - Brett Sutter 2
No scoring		Second period		No scoring
Brian Fahey 1 - 14:18		Third period		No scoring
No scoring		First overtime period		1:30 - Nicolas Blanchard 2
Braden Holtby 28 saves / 30 shots		Goalie stats		Mike Murphy 26 saves / 27 shots

Charlotte won series 4–2

=== Western Conference ===
==== North Division ====
===== (N1) Hamilton Bulldogs vs. (W5) Oklahoma City Barons =====
April 14	Hamilton Bulldogs	5 – 2	Oklahoma City Barons	Copps Coliseum	Recap
Nigel Dawes 1 - pp - 1:38; Olivier Fortier 1 - 9:43; Ryan Russell 1 - 16:41		First period	No scoring
Aaron Palushaj 1 - pp - 13:39		Second period	7:23 - Ben Ondrus 1
Joe Stejskal 1 - pp - 1:29		Third period	7:00 - Bryan Helmer 1
Drew MacIntyre 24 saves / 26 shots		Goalie stats	Jeff Drouin-Deslauriers 3 saves / 6 shots Martin Gerber 21 saves / 23 shots

April 16	Hamilton Bulldogs	2 – 1	Oklahoma City Barons	Copps Coliseum	Recap
Andreas Engqvist 1 - 19:57		First period	17:18 - Brad Moran 1
Nigel Dawes 2 - pp - 1:03		Second period	No scoring
No scoring		Third period	No scoring
Drew MacIntyre 38 saves / 39 shots		Goalie stats	Martin Gerber 21 saves / 23 shots

April 19	Oklahoma City Barons	2 – 0	Hamilton Bulldogs	Cox Convention Center	Recap
No scoring		First period	No scoring
No scoring		Second period	No scoring
Colin McDonald 1 - 8:38; Alexandre Giroux 1 - 15:59		Third period	No scoring
Martin Gerber 26 saves / 26 shots		Goalie stats	Drew MacIntyre 44 saves / 46 shots

April 20	Oklahoma City Barons	5 – 2	Hamilton Bulldogs	Cox Convention Center	Recap
Hunter Tremblay 1 - 3:06		First period	10:29 - Ian Schultz 1
Zack Stortini 1 - 5:40; Mark Arcobello 1 - pp - 19:34		Second period	13:50 - Paul Zanette 1
Linus Omark 1 - 11:26; Chris VandeVelde 1 - en - 19:20		Third period	No scoring
Martin Gerber 29 saves / 31 shots		Goalie stats	Drew MacIntyre 23 saves / 27 shots

April 22	Oklahoma City Barons	0 – 2	Hamilton Bulldogs	Cox Convention Center	Recap
No scoring		First period	7:31 - pp - Aaron Palushaj 2
No scoring		Second period	18:33 - Nigel Dawes 3
No scoring		Third period	No scoring
Martin Gerber 23 saves / 25 shots		Goalie stats	Drew MacIntyre 20 saves / 20 shots

April 24	Hamilton Bulldogs	4 – 1	Oklahoma City Barons	Copps Coliseum	Recap
No scoring		First period	No scoring
No scoring		Second period	No scoring
Nigel Dawes 4 - 6:43; Frederic St. Denis 1 - pp - 17:04; Nigel Dawes 5 - en - 19:15; J. T. Wyman 1 - en - 19:48		Third period	5:41 - Alexandre Giroux 2
Drew MacIntyre 24 saves / 25 shots		Goalie stats	Martin Gerber 15 saves / 17 shots

Hamilton won series 4–2

===== (N2) Lake Erie Monsters vs. (N3) Manitoba Moose =====
April 16	Lake Erie Monsters	6 – 4	Manitoba Moose	Quicken Loans Arena	Recap
Matthew Ford 1 - 3:27		First period	6:47 - Marco Rosa 1; 13:46 - Sergei Shirokov 1
Justin Mercier 1 - sh - 1:41; Ben Walter 1 - pp - 9:20; Ryan Stoa 1 - 17:33		Second period	No scoring
Matthew Ford 2 - 13:18; Mark Olver 1 - en - 19:42		Third period	0:20 - Marco Rosa 2; 16:56 - sh - Kevin Connauton 1
Jason Bacashihua 21 saves / 25 shots		Goalie stats	Eddie Lack 19 saves / 24 shots Tyler Weiman 2 saves / 2 shots

April 17	Lake Erie Monsters	2 – 3	OT	Manitoba Moose	Quicken Loans Arena	Recap
David Van der Gulik 1 - pp - 19:34		First period		10:38 - Aaron Volpatti 1
No scoring		Second period		No scoring
Julien Brouillette 1 - 11:28		Third period		19:10 - Marco Rosa 3
No scoring		First overtime period		8:03 - Rick Rypien 1
John Grahame 40 saves / 43 shots		Goalie stats		Tyler Weiman 34 saves / 36 shots

April 19	Manitoba Moose	1 – 2	Lake Erie Monsters	MTS Centre	Recap
Sergei Shirokov 2 - 1:09		First period	No scoring
No scoring		Second period	0:38 - David Van der Gulik 2; 3:03 - Ben Walter 2
No scoring		Third period	No scoring
Tyler Weiman 17 saves / 19 shots		Goalie stats	John Grahame 39 saves / 40 shots

April 21	Manitoba Moose	3 – 6	Lake Erie Monsters	MTS Centre	Recap
No scoring		First period	13:12 - pp - Ben Walter 3; 16:29 - pp - Luke Walker 1
Kevin Clark 1 - 3:08; Jason Jaffray 1 - 17:45		Second period	7:56 - pp - Justin Mercier 2; 9:00 - sh - Justin Mercier 3
Kevin Clark 2 - 13:56		Third period	19:27 - en - Matthew Ford 3; 19:50 - en - Mark Olver 2
Tyler Weiman 16 saves / 20 shots Eddie Lack 8 saves / 8 shots		Goalie stats	John Grahame 36 saves / 39 shots

April 22	Manitoba Moose	2 – 0	Lake Erie Monsters	MTS Centre	Recap
No scoring		First period	No scoring
No scoring		Second period	No scoring
Sergei Shirokov 3 - 6:35; Jason Jaffray 2 - en - 19:50		Third period	No scoring
Eddie Lack 26 saves / 26 shots		Goalie stats	Jason Bacashihua 29 saves / 30 shots

April 24	Lake Erie Monsters	1 – 3	Manitoba Moose	Quicken Loans Arena	Recap
No scoring		First period	No scoring
Julian Talbot 1 - pp - 2:10		Second period	3:43 - Bill Sweatt 1
No scoring		Third period	7:36 - pp - Keith Seabrook 1; 17:02 - Sergei Shirokov 4
John Grahame 14 saves / 17 shots		Goalie stats	Eddie Lack 28 saves / 29 shots

April 26	Lake Erie Monsters	1 – 4	Manitoba Moose	Quicken Loans Arena	Recap
Jonas Holos 1 - 19:02		First period	No scoring
No scoring		Second period	16:21 - Sergei Shirokov 5
No scoring		Third period	10:00 - Alexandre Bolduc 1; 10:55 - pp - Keith Seabrook 2; 18:09 - en - Marco Rosa 4
John Grahame 17 saves / 20 shots		Goalie stats	Eddie Lack 32 saves / 33 shots

Manitoba won series 4–3

==== West Division ====
===== (W1) Milwaukee Admirals vs. (W4) Texas Stars =====
April 14	Milwaukee Admirals	5 – 2	Texas Stars	Bradley Center	Recap
Gabriel Bourque 1 - 14:22; Chris Mueller 1 - pp - 17:15		First period	9:48 - pp - Aaron Gagnon 1
Ryan Thang 1 - 7:36; Gabriel Bourque 2 - 18:41		Second period	No scoring
Chris Mueller 2 - 9:26		Third period	6:59 - Mathieu Tousignant 1
Jeremy Smith 22 saves / 24 shots		Goalie stats	Richard Bachman 13 saves / 17 shots Tyler Beskorowany 7 saves / 8 shots

April 16	Milwaukee Admirals	1 – 3	Texas Stars	Bradley Center	Recap
Teemu Laakso 1 - pp - 11:17		First period	No scoring
No scoring		Second period	12:52 - pp - Philip Larsen 1; 15:34 - Aaron Gagnon 2
No scoring		Third period	4:03 - pp - Travis Morin 1
Jeremy Smith 26 saves / 29 shots		Goalie stats	Richard Bachman 29 saves / 30 shots

April 19	Texas Stars	3 – 2	OT	Milwaukee Admirals	Cedar Park Center	Recap
No scoring		First period		3:36 - Chris Mueller 3
No scoring		Second period		No scoring
Philip Larsen 2 - pp - 15:51; Brad Lukowich 1 - 19:39		Third period		0:34 - Gabriel Bourque 3
Travis Morin 2 - 8:44		First overtime period		No scoring
Richard Bachman 21 saves / 23 shots		Goalie stats		Jeremy Smith 37 saves / 40 shots

April 20	Texas Stars	2 – 3	Milwaukee Admirals	Cedar Park Center	Recap
No scoring		First period	14:03 - pp - Gabriel Bourque 4
Scott Glennie 1 - 6:25		Second period	12:37 - pp - Taylor Beck 1
Greg Rallo 1 - pp - 8:45		Third period	3:13 - Mark Van Guilder 1
Richard Bachman 20 saves / 23 shots		Goalie stats	Jeremy Smith 30 saves / 32 shots

April 22	Texas Stars	1 – 2	OT	Milwaukee Admirals	Cedar Park Center	Recap
Raymond Sawada 1 - pp - 10:20		First period		No scoring
No scoring		Second period		No scoring
No scoring		Third period		19:55 - Gabriel Bourque 5
No scoring		First overtime period		16:29 - Ryan Thang 2
Richard Bachman 36 saves / 38 shots		Goalie stats		Jeremy Smith 40 saves / 41 shots

April 25	Milwaukee Admirals	3 – 2	2OT	Texas Stars	Bradley Center	Recap
Mike Bartlett 1 - 4:20		First period		No scoring
No scoring		Second period		4:41 - pp - Colton Sceviour 1
Andreas Thuresson 1 - 1:22		Third period		7:14 - Travis Morin 3
Mark Van Guilder 2 - 10:42		Second overtime period		No scoring
Jeremy Smith 52 saves / 54 shots		Goalie stats		Richard Bachman 47 saves / 50 shots

Milwaukee won series 4–2

===== (W2) Houston Aeros vs. (W3) Peoria Rivermen =====
April 13	Houston Aeros	4 – 1	Peoria Rivermen	Toyota Center	Recap
Warren Peters 1 - 7:46; Robbie Earl 1 - pp - 16:39		First period	1:16 - Adam Cracknell 1
Jed Ortmeyer 1 - 16:38		Second period	No scoring
Patrick O'Sullivan 1 - 0:22		Third period	No scoring
Matt Hackett 17 saves / 18 shots		Goalie stats	Jake Allen 27 saves / 31 shots

April 15	Houston Aeros	3 – 2	OT	Peoria Rivermen	Toyota Center	Recap
Jarod Palmer 1 - 10:24		First period		10:10 - Anthony Peluso 1
Chad Rau 1 - pp - 8:44		Second period		7:12 - pp - Adam Cracknell 2
No scoring		Third period		No scoring
Carson McMillan 1 - 11:34		First overtime period		No scoring
Matt Hackett32 saves / 34 shots		Goalie stats		Jake Allen 43 saves / 46 shots

April 18	Peoria Rivermen	3 – 5	Houston Aeros	Carver Arena	Recap
Akim Aliu 1 - 0:19; T. J. Hensick 1 - 9:49		First period	No scoring
T. J. Hensick 2 - pp - 3:41		Second period	0:48 - pp - Casey Wellman 1; 9:43 - Jon DiSalvatore 1
No scoring		Third period	1:12 - Chad Rau 2; 11:53 - Colton Gillies 1; 15:31 - Colton Gillies 2
Jake Allen 25 saves / 30 shots		Goalie stats	Matt Hackett 12 saves / 15 shots

April 19	Peoria Rivermen	1 – 2	Houston Aeros	Carver Arena	Recap
Nathan Oystrick 1 - pp - 8:03		First period	No scoring
No scoring		Second period	8:22 - Drew Bagnall 1; 11:04 - Patrick O'Sullivan 2
No scoring		Third period	No scoring
Ben Bishop 17 saves / 19 shots		Goalie stats	Matt Hackett 23 saves / 24 shots

Houston won series 4–0

== Division finals ==
=== Eastern Conference ===
==== Atlantic Division ====
===== (A1) Portland Pirates vs. (E5) Binghamton Senators =====
April 27	Portland Pirates	2 – 3	Binghamton Senators	Cumberland County Civic Center	Recap
Maxime Legault 1 - 4:27		First period	No scoring
Colin Stuart 2 - 17:14		Second period	6:28 - Ryan Keller 4; 7:39 - pp - Bobby Butler 5
No scoring		Third period	7:35 - Zack Smith 1
David Leggio 40 saves / 43 shots		Goalie stats	Robin Lehner 33 saves / 35 shots

April 28	Portland Pirates	3 – 5	Binghamton Senators	Cumberland County Civic Center	Recap
Derek Whitmore 3 - 13:08		First period	No scoring
Mark Mancari 3 - 1:27		Second period	8:28 - sh - Kaspars Daugavins 3; 11:16 - Zack Smith 2; 16:22 - pp - Bobby Butler 6
Mark Mancari 4 - 10:40		Third period	16:09 - Bob Raymond 1; 19:56 - en - Kaspars Daugavins 4
Jhonas Enroth 21 saves / 25 shots		Goalie stats	Robin Lehner 43 saves / 46 shots

April 30	Binghamton Senators	2 – 3	Portland Pirates	Broome County Veterans Memorial Arena	Recap
No scoring		First period	5:29 - Brian O'Hanley 1
Ryan Keller 5 - 5:16; Kaspars Daugavins 5 - pp - 14:56		Second period	No scoring
No scoring		Third period	14:51 - Derek Whitmore 4; 19:47 - Tim Conboy 1
Robin Lehner 30 saves / 33 shots		Goalie stats	David Leggio 32 saves / 34 shots

May 2	Binghamton Senators	6 – 1	Portland Pirates	Broome County Veterans Memorial Arena	Recap
Mike Hoffman 1 - pp - 2:54; Kaspars Daugavins 6 - 8:27; Ryan Keller 6 - pp - 16:18		First period	8:17 - Luke Adam 3
Kaspars Daugavins 7 - 1:26; Ryan Potulny 9 - 12:23		Second period	No scoring
Ryan Potulny 10 - pp - 19:12		Third period	No scoring
Robin Lehner 22 saves / 23 shots		Goalie stats	David Leggio 16 saves / 20 shots Jhonas Enroth 17 saves / 19 shots

May 3	Binghamton Senators	2 – 6	Portland Pirates	Broome County Veterans Memorial Arena	Recap
No scoring		First period	4:59 - pp - Colin Stuart 3; 6:09 - pp - Luke Adam 4; 11:40 - sh - Mark Mancari 5; 14:29 - Mark Parrish 3
Jim O'Brien 1 - 5:52; Bobby Butler 7 - 15:30		Second period	2:37 - Mark Voakes 3; 12:33 - Mark Mancari 6
No scoring		Third period	No scoring
Robin Lehner 10 saves / 14 shots Barry Brust 25 saves / 27 shots		Goalie stats	Jhonas Enroth 35 saves / 37 shots

May 6	Portland Pirates	0 – 3	Binghamton Senators	Cumberland County Civic Center	Recap
No scoring		First period	0:25 - Jim O'Brien 2
No scoring		Second period	13:04 - pp - Zack Smith 3
No scoring		Third period	18:39 - en - Kaspars Daugavins 8
Jhonas Enroth 31 saves / 33 shots		Goalie stats	Robin Lehner 36 saves / 36 shots

Binghamton won series 4–2

==== East Division ====
===== (E1) Wilkes-Barre/Scranton Penguins vs. (E3) Charlotte Checkers =====
April 28	Wilkes-Barre/Scranton Penguins	2 – 3	Charlotte Checkers	Mohegan Sun Arena at Casey Plaza	Recap
No scoring		First period	15:10 - Zac Dalpe 4
Geoff Walker 1 - pp - 4:29		Second period	7:18 - pp - Jon Matsumoto 1
Brett Sterling 1 - pp - 6:26		Third period	5:03 - pp - Jon Matsumoto 2
Brad Thiessen 16 saves / 19 shots		Goalie stats	Mike Murphy 28 saves / 30 shots

April 30	Wilkes-Barre/Scranton Penguins	3 – 0	Charlotte Checkers	Mohegan Sun Arena at Casey Plaza	Recap
No scoring		First period	No scoring
Brett Sterling 2 - 15:17		Second period	No scoring
Chris Collins 1 - 2:22; Ryan Craig 2 - en - 19:17		Third period	No scoring
Brad Thiessen 34 saves / 34 shots		Goalie stats	Mike Murphy 28 saves / 30 shots

May 2	Charlotte Checkers	2 – 1	OT	Wilkes-Barre/Scranton Penguins	Time Warner Cable Arena	Recap
No scoring		First period		13:23 - Chris Collins 2
Nick Dodge 4 - 9:45		Second period		No scoring
No scoring		Third period		No scoring
Brett Sutter 3 - 5:40		First overtime period		No scoring
Mike Murphy 26 saves / 27 shots		Goalie stats		Brad Thiessen 21 saves / 23 shots

May 4	Charlotte Checkers	1 – 0	Wilkes-Barre/Scranton Penguins	Time Warner Cable Arena	Recap
No scoring		First period	No scoring
No scoring		Second period	No scoring
Chris Terry 2 - pp - 2:01		Third period	No scoring
Mike Murphy 44 saves / 44 shots		Goalie stats	Brad Thiessen 31 saves / 32 shots

May 6	Charlotte Checkers	0 – 1	Wilkes-Barre/Scranton Penguins	Time Warner Cable Arena	Recap
No scoring		First period	No scoring
No scoring		Second period	No scoring
No scoring		Third period	8:54 - Chris Collins 3
Mike Murphy 32 saves / 33 shots		Goalie stats	Brad Thiessen 23 saves / 23 shots

May 7	Wilkes-Barre/Scranton Penguins	3 – 4	Charlotte Checkers	Mohegan Sun Arena at Casey Plaza	Recap
No scoring		First period	No scoring
Ryan Craig 3 - 7:13; Corey Potter 2 - pp - 9:45		Second period	No scoring
Joe Vitale 3 - sh - 1:13		Third period	7:24 - Chris Terry 3; 10:40 - Brett Sutter 4; 11:10 - Chris Terry 4; 16:42 - Zac Dalpe 5
Brad Thiessen 29 saves / 33 shots		Goalie stats	Mike Murphy 32 saves / 35 shots

Charlotte won series 4–2

=== Western Conference ===
==== North Division ====
===== (N1) Hamilton Bulldogs vs. (N3) Manitoba Moose =====
April 28	Hamilton Bulldogs	4 – 1	Manitoba Moose	Copps Coliseum	Recap
Ryan Russell 2 - 9:27		First period	5:10 - Alexandre Bolduc 2
Aaron Palushaj 3 - pp - 13:34; Nigel Dawes 6 - pp - 16:16; J. T. Wyman 2 - sh - 18:59		Second period	No scoring
No scoring		Third period	No scoring
Drew MacIntyre 19 saves / 20 shots		Goalie stats	Eddie Lack 33 saves / 37 shots

May 1	Hamilton Bulldogs	4 – 2	Manitoba Moose	Copps Coliseum	Recap
Mathieu Carle 1 - pp - 9:08		First period	2:47 - Kevin Clark 3
Ryan Russell 3 - 14:44		Second period	No scoring
Gabriel Dumont 1 - 4:22; Gabriel Dumont 2 - en - 19:11		Third period	19:30 - Chris Tanev 1
Drew MacIntyre 24 saves / 26 shots		Goalie stats	Eddie Lack 27 saves / 30 shots

May 3	Manitoba Moose	5 – 4	Hamilton Bulldogs	MTS Centre	Recap
Alexandre Bolduc 3 - 14:42		First period	16:08 - Ian Schultz 2
Jordan Schroeder 1 - 19:25; Sergei Shirokov 6 - pp - 19:59		Second period	4:40 - Aaron Palushaj 4
Marco Rosa 5 - pp - 4:40; Jason Jaffray 3 - 17:43		Third period	5:18 - Gabriel Dumont 3; 19:28 - pp - Ryan White 1
Eddie Lack 23 saves / 27 shots		Goalie stats	Drew MacIntyre 23 saves / 28 shots

May 4	Manitoba Moose	2 – 1	2OT	Hamilton Bulldogs	MTS Centre	Recap
No scoring		First period		No scoring
No scoring		Second period		6:50 - pp - Gabriel Dumont 4
Guillaume Desbiens 1 - 17:58		Third period		No scoring
Mario Bliznak 1 - 11:54		Second overtime period		No scoring
Eddie Lack 43 saves / 44 shots		Goalie stats		Drew MacIntyre 32 saves / 34 shots

May 6	Manitoba Moose	1 – 5	Hamilton Bulldogs	MTS Centre	Recap
No scoring		First period	1:09 - pp - Nigel Dawes 7
Marco Rosa 6 - pp - 15:04		Second period	4:58 - Jimmy Bonneau 1
No scoring		Third period	12:26 - Ryan Russell 4; 16:13 - Ryan White 2; 17:50 - en - Nigel Dawes 8
Eddie Lack 25 saves / 29 shots		Goalie stats	Drew MacIntyre 22 saves / 23 shots

May 8	Hamilton Bulldogs	0 – 1	Manitoba Moose	Copps Coliseum	Recap
No scoring		First period	No scoring
No scoring		Second period	3:40 - sh - Alexandre Bolduc 4
No scoring		Third period	No scoring
Drew MacIntyre 33 saves / 34 shots		Goalie stats	Eddie Lack 25 saves / 25 shots

May 9	Hamilton Bulldogs	2 – 1	3OT	Manitoba Moose	Copps Coliseum	Recap
No scoring		First period		10:09 - pp - Sergei Shirokov 7
No scoring		Second period		No scoring
Nigel Dawes 9 - 6:24		Third period		No scoring
Dustin Boyd 1 - 0:06		Third overtime period		No scoring
Drew MacIntyre 29 saves / 30 shots		Goalie stats		Eddie Lack 55 saves / 57 shots

Hamilton won series 4–3

==== West Division ====
===== (W1) Milwaukee Admirals vs. (W2) Houston Aeros =====
April 29	Milwaukee Admirals	3 – 1	Houston Aeros	Bradley Center	Recap
Steve Begin 1 - 9:49; Taylor Beck 2 - 10:30		First period	No scoring
No scoring		Second period	No scoring
Ryan Thang 3 - 0:32		Third period	6:53 - Colton Gillies 3
Jeremy Smith 25 saves / 26 shots		Goalie stats	Matt Hackett 18 saves / 21 shots

May 1	Milwaukee Admirals	0 – 2	Houston Aeros	Bradley Center	Recap
No scoring		First period	No scoring
No scoring		Second period	11:47 - pp - Warren Peters 2
No scoring		Third period	3:56 - Colton Gillies 4
Jeremy Smith 22 saves / 24 shots		Goalie stats	Matt Hackett 21 saves / 21 shots

May 3	Houston Aeros	3 – 5	Milwaukee Admirals	Toyota Center	Recap
Jared Spurgeon 1 - pp - 8:15		First period	17:55 - Mark Van Guilder 3
No scoring		Second period	8:55 - Ryan Thang 4; 13:58 - Andreas Thuresson 2
Marco Scandella 1 - pp - 8:16; Jarod Palmer 2 - 10:08		Third period	9:35 - Steve Begin 2; 10:35 - Mike Bartlett 2
Matt Hackett 20 saves / 25 shots		Goalie stats	Jeremy Smith 31 saves / 34 shots

May 5	Houston Aeros	3 – 2	OT	Milwaukee Admirals	Toyota Center	Recap
Colton Gillies 5 - 1:58; Patrick O'Sullivan 3 - pp - 9:53		First period		14:28 - Andreas Thuresson 3
No scoring		Second period		13:12 - pp - Aaron Johnson 1
No scoring		Third period		No scoring
Carson McMillan 2 - 3:35		First overtime period		No scoring
Matt Hackett 11 saves / 13 shots		Goalie stats		Jeremy Smith 30 saves / 33 shots

May 6	Houston Aeros	3 – 2	OT	Milwaukee Admirals	Toyota Center	Recap
No scoring		First period		No scoring
No scoring		Second period		11:28 - Ryan Thang 5; 19:55 - sh - Steve Begin 3
Robbie Earl 2 - pp - 15:38; Chad Rau 3 - 18:39		Third period		No scoring
Robbie Earl 3 - 8:45		First overtime period		No scoring
Matt Hackett 23 saves / 25 shots		Goalie stats		Jeremy Smith 50 saves / 53 shots

May 8	Milwaukee Admirals	5 – 4	OT	Houston Aeros	Bradley Center	Recap
Ryan Ellis 1 - pp - 4:46; Gabriel Bourque 6 - 18:29		First period		No scoring
Roman Josi 1 - pp - 3:24		Second period		9:42 - Jarod Palmer 3; 10:29 - Maxim Noreau 1; 13:36 - pp - Jon DiSalvatore 2
Chris Mueller 4 - 15:16		Third period		9:32 - Patrick O'Sullivan 4
Kelsey Wilson 1 - 1:01		First overtime period		No scoring
Jeremy Smith 29 saves / 33 shots		Goalie stats		Matt Hackett 18 saves / 23 shots

May 10	Milwaukee Admirals	2 – 4	Houston Aeros	Bradley Center	Recap
Gabriel Bourque 7 - 8:02		First period	19:47 - Colton Gillies 6
No scoring		Second period	No scoring
Matt Halischuk 1 - pp - 8:26		Third period	3:18 - Carson McMillan 3; 18:39 - Casey Wellman 2; 18:56 - en - Warren Peters 3
Jeremy Smith 36 saves / 39 shots		Goalie stats	Matt Hackett 30 saves / 32 shots

Houston won series 4–3

== Conference finals ==
=== Eastern Conference ===
==== (E3) Charlotte Checkers vs. (E5) Binghamton Senators ====
May 12	Charlotte Checkers	4 – 7	Binghamton Senators	Time Warner Cable Arena	Recap
Brad Herauf 1 - 2:06; Zac Dalpe 6 - 11:12; Riley Nash 1 - pp - 17:54		First period	1:37 - Corey Locke 1; 2:42 - Kaspars Daugavins 9; 9:04 - sh - Andre Benoit 2; 13:33 - pp - Bobby Butler 8
No scoring		Second period	11:31 - Roman Wick 2
Oskar Osala 3 - pp - 6:25		Third period	10:03 - Erik Condra 3; 10:28 - Ryan Potulny 11
Mike Murphy 10 saves / 15 shots Justin Pogge 5 saves / 7 shots		Goalie stats	Robin Lehner 9 saves / 12 shots Barry Brust 27 saves / 28 shots

May 13	Charlotte Checkers	0 – 3	Binghamton Senators	Time Warner Cable Arena	Recap
No scoring		First period	19:16 - Ryan Potulny 12
No scoring		Second period	0:29 - pp - Ryan Potulny 13
No scoring		Third period	13:01 - Bobby Butler 9
Mike Murphy 28 saves / 31 shots		Goalie stats	Robin Lehner 35 saves / 35 shots

May 17	Binghamton Senators	7 – 1	Charlotte Checkers	Broome County Veterans Memorial Arena	Recap
Erik Condra 4 - 8:33		First period	No scoring
Zack Smith 4 - 3:41; Zack Smith 5 - sh - 6:09		Second period	11:21 - Jon Matsumoto 3
Ryan Keller 7 - pp - 0:55; Bobby Butler 10 - 11:23; Zack Smith 6 - 12:43; Roman Wick 3 - 19:06		Third period	No scoring
Robin Lehner 37 saves / 38 shots		Goalie stats	Mike Murphy 24 saves / 29 shots Justin Pogge 1 saves / 3 shots

May 18	Binghamton Senators	4 – 3	OT	Charlotte Checkers	Broome County Veterans Memorial Arena	Recap
Ryan Potulny 14 - pp - 12:34; Kaspars Daugavins 10 - sh - 19:39		First period		No scoring
No scoring		Second period		17:20 - Chris Terry 5; 18:39 - Casey Borer 1
Andre Benoit 3 - pp - 4:44		Third period		18:36 - Chris Terry 6
Ryan Keller 8 - 13:05		First overtime period		No scoring
Robin Lehner 42 saves / 45 shots		Goalie stats		Mike Murphy 33 saves / 37 shots

Binghamton won series 4–0

=== Western Conference ===
==== (W2) Houston Aeros vs. (N1) Hamilton Bulldogs ====
May 13	Houston Aeros	2 – 1	Hamilton Bulldogs	Toyota Center	Recap
Chad Rau 4 - pp - 14:52		First period	No scoring
Jed Ortmeyer 2 - 2:59		Second period	No scoring
No scoring		Third period	19:09 - Mathieu Carle 2
Matt Hackett 38 saves / 39 shots		Goalie stats	Drew MacIntyre 26 saves / 28 shots

May 15	Houston Aeros	3 – 2	Hamilton Bulldogs	Toyota Center	Recap
No scoring		First period	No scoring
Robbie Earl 4 - pp - 3:16; Marco Scandella 2 - pp - 19:50		Second period	14:03 - Gabriel Dumont 5
Colton Gillies 7 - 5:10		Third period	12:06 - Ryan Russell 5
Matt Hackett 27 saves / 29 shots		Goalie stats	Drew MacIntyre 24 saves / 27 shots

May 17	Hamilton Bulldogs	2 – 3	Houston Aeros	Copps Coliseum	Recap
Nigel Dawes 10 - pp - 18:11; Andreas Engqvist 2 - 19:38		First period	3:39 - Jon DiSalvatore 3; 15:40 - Maxim Noreau 2
No scoring		Second period	5:18 - pp - Jon DiSalvatore 4
No scoring		Third period	No scoring
Drew MacIntyre 24 saves / 27 shots		Goalie stats	Matt Hackett 25 saves / 27 shots

May 18	Hamilton Bulldogs	8 – 1	Houston Aeros	Copps Coliseum	Recap
Ryan Russell 6 - sh - 1:03; Aaron Palushaj 5 - 15:09; Gabriel Dumont 6 - 19:34		First period	2:25 - pp - Casey Wellman 3
J. T. Wyman 3 - 13:05; Dustin Boyd 2 - 13:36; Nigel Dawes 11 - 14:53		Second period	No scoring
Dustin Boyd 3 - 11:48; Nigel Dawes 12 - pp - 18:59		Third period	No scoring
Drew MacIntyre 14 saves / 15 shots		Goalie stats	Matt Hackett 17 saves / 22 shots Josh Tordjman 15 saves / 18 shots

May 20	Hamilton Bulldogs	4 – 2	Houston Aeros	Copps Coliseum	Recap
Paul Zanette 2 - 8:18; Aaron Palushaj 6 - pp - 10:17		First period	No scoring
No scoring		Second period	5:04 - Jean-Michel Daoust 1
Ryan Russell 7 - sh - 8:22; Andrew Conboy 1 - en - 18:50		Third period	10:02 - Jed Ortmeyer 3
Drew MacIntyre 31 saves / 33 shots		Goalie stats	Matt Hackett 26 saves / 29 shots

May 22	Houston Aeros	4 – 5	2OT	Hamilton Bulldogs	Toyota Center	Recap
Chad Rau 5 - pp - 3:34		First period		8:58 - Andreas Engqvist 3
Robbie Earl 5 - 4:29		Second period		16:07 - pp - Dustin Boyd 4; 18:37 - Nigel Dawes 13
Nate Prosser 1 - 11:02; Jed Ortmeyer 4 - 18:04		Third period		0:27 - sh - Andreas Engqvist 4
No scoring		Second overtime period		9:11 - Nigel Dawes 14
Matt Hackett 33 saves / 38 shots		Goalie stats		Drew MacIntyre 57 saves / 61 shots

May 24	Houston Aeros	4 – 3	Hamilton Bulldogs	Toyota Center	Recap
Chad Rau 6 - 7:03; Casey Wellman 4 - 7:12		First period	9:13 - Dustin Boyd 5; 13:21 - pp - Mathieu Carle 3
Casey Wellman 5 - 2:42		Second period	9:57 - pp - Aaron Palushaj 7
Jon DiSalvatore 5 - 18:47		Third period	No scoring
Matt Hackett 24 saves / 27 shots		Goalie stats	Drew MacIntyre 30 saves / 34 shots

Houston won series 4–3

== Calder Cup finals ==
=== Binghamton Senators vs. Houston Aeros ===
May 27	Houston Aeros	3 – 1	Binghamton Senators	Toyota Center	Recap
No scoring		First period	No scoring
No scoring		Second period	16:17 - Bobby Butler 11
Jed Ortmeyer 5 - 1:47; Jed Ortmeyer 6 - 6:09; Warren Peters 4 - en - 19:24		Third period	No scoring
Matt Hackett 23 saves / 24 shots		Goalie stats	Robin Lehner 38 saves / 40 shots

May 28	Houston Aeros	1 – 2	OT	Binghamton Senators	Toyota Center	Recap
Casey Wellman 6 - pp - 4:27		First period		1:45 - pp - Bobby Butler 12
No scoring		Second period		No scoring
No scoring		Third period		No scoring
No scoring		First overtime period		7:54 - Jim O'Brien 3
Matt Hackett 19 saves / 21 shots		Goalie stats		Robin Lehner 28 saves / 29 shots

June 1	Binghamton Senators	1 – 2	Houston Aeros	Broome County Veterans Memorial Arena	Recap
No scoring		First period	1:08 - Jon DiSalvatore 6
No scoring		Second period	12:51 - Nate Prosser 2
Ryan Keller 9 - pp - 2:52		Third period	No scoring
Robin Lehner 28 saves / 30 shots		Goalie stats	Matt Hackett 28 saves / 29 shots

June 3	Binghamton Senators	3 – 0	Houston Aeros	Broome County Veterans Memorial Arena	Recap
Cody Bass 2 - 11:48; Corey Locke 2 - pp - 17:10		First period	No scoring
No scoring		Second period	No scoring
Derek Smith 1 - 2:19		Third period	No scoring
Robin Lehner 21 saves / 21 shots		Goalie stats	Matt Hackett 34 saves / 37 shots

June 4	Binghamton Senators	4 – 2	Houston Aeros	Broome County Veterans Memorial Arena	Recap
Corey Locke 3 - 9:19; Erik Condra 5 - 12:17		First period	11:08 - Jean-Michel Daoust 2; 19:53 - Jean-Michel Daoust 3
Zack Smith 7 - pp - 19:51		Second period	No scoring
Zack Smith 8 - 15:56		Third period	No scoring
Robin Lehner 41 saves / 43 shots		Goalie stats	Matt Hackett 23 saves / 27 shots

June 7	Houston Aeros	2 – 3	Binghamton Senators	Toyota Center	Recap
No scoring		First period	No scoring
Jon DiSalvatore 7 - pp - 6:37; Jean-Michel Daoust 4 - pp - 11:20		Second period	2:28 - Roman Wick 4
No scoring		Third period	3:26 - pp - Bobby Butler 13; 9:09 - pp - Ryan Keller 10
Matt Hackett 24 saves / 27 shots		Goalie stats	Robin Lehner 34 saves / 36 shots

Binghamton won series 4–2

== Playoff statistical leaders ==
=== Leading skaters ===
These are the top ten skaters based on points. If there is a tie in points, goals take precedence over assists.

GP = Games played; G = Goals; A = Assists; Pts = Points; +/– = Plus–minus; PIM = Penalty minutes

Player	Team	GP	G	A	Pts	+/–	PIM
Ryan Potulny	Binghamton Senators	23	14	12	26	+6	12
Ryan Keller	Binghamton Senators	23	10	15	25	+6	8
Nigel Dawes	Hamilton Bulldogs	20	14	8	22	+4	8
Kaspars Daugavins	Binghamton Senators	23	10	10	20	+8	8
Zack Smith	Binghamton Senators	23	8	12	20	–5	36
Aaron Palushaj	Hamilton Bulldogs	19	7	12	19	+2	14
Patrick O'Sullivan	Houston Aeros	24	4	14	18	–5	16
Andre Benoit	Binghamton Senators	23	3	15	18	+6	14
Bobby Butler	Binghamton Senators	23	13	4	17	–1	6
Marco Rosa	Manitoba Moose	14	6	11	17	+1	4

=== Leading goaltenders ===
This is a combined table of the top five goaltenders based on goals against average and the top five goaltenders based on save percentage. The table is initially sorted by goals against average, with the criterion for inclusion in bold.

GP = Games played; W = Wins; L = Losses; SA = Shots against; GA = Goals against; GAA = Goals against average; SV% = Save percentage; SO = Shutouts; TOI = Time on ice (in minutes)

Player	Team	GP	W	L	SA	GA	GAA	SV%	SO	TOI
Brad Thiessen	Wilkes-Barre/Scranton Penguins	12	6	6	332	20	**1.67**	**.940**	2	720
Martin Gerber	Oklahoma City Barons	6	2	3	145	10	**1.79**	**.931**	1	335
Drew MacIntyre	Hamilton Bulldogs	20	11	9	603	42	**1.95**	.930	1	1289
Eddie Lack	Manitoba Moose	12	6	5	369	25	**1.99**	**.932**	2	752
Robin Lehner	Binghamton Senators	19	14	4	639	39	**2.10**	**.939**	3	1112
Jeremy Smith	Milwaukee Admirals	13	7	6	462	32	2.28	**.931**	0	843

== See also ==
- 2010–11 AHL season
- List of AHL seasons

Preceded by 2010 Calder Cup playoffs	Calder Cup playoffs 2011	Succeeded by 2012 Calder Cup playoffs
