= Zack Smith =

Canadian ice hockey player (born 1988)

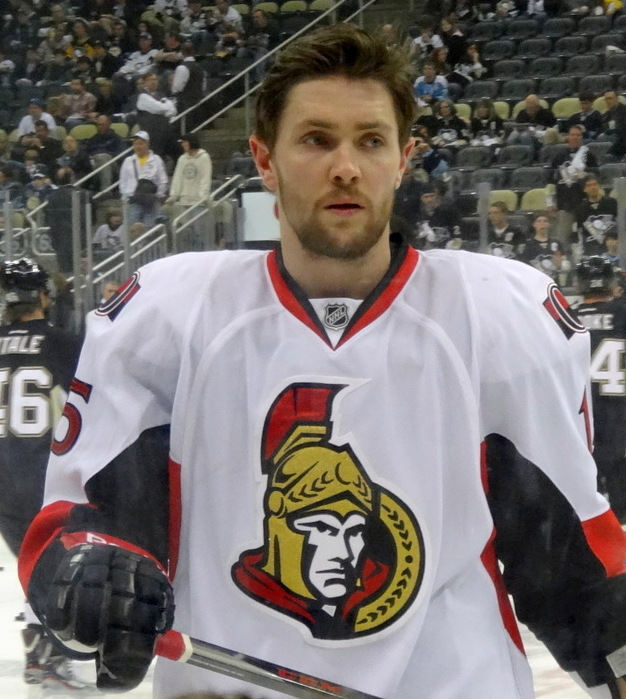
- Smith with the Ottawa Senators in May 2013
- Born: April 5, 1988 (age 38) Maple Creek, Saskatchewan, Canada
- Height: 6 ft 2 in (188 cm)
- Weight: 202 lb (92 kg; 14 st 6 lb)
- Position: Centre/Left wing
- Shot: Left
- Played for: Ottawa Senators; Chicago Blackhawks
- NHL draft: 79th overall, 2008; Ottawa Senators
- Playing career: 2008–2020

Zachary Smith (born April 5, 1988) is a Canadian former professional ice hockey player. He played for the Ottawa Senators, who drafted him 79th overall in the 2008 NHL entry draft, and the Chicago Blackhawks of the National Hockey League (NHL).

== Playing career ==
=== Junior ===
Born in Maple Creek, Saskatchewan, Smith was drafted in the third round, 79th overall, of the 2008 NHL entry draft by the Ottawa Senators. He was rated 108th among North American skaters by the NHL Central Scouting Bureau.

After playing four seasons in the Western Hockey League (WHL) with the Swift Current Broncos, Smith was offered an amateur tryout contract with the Manitoba Moose of the American Hockey League (AHL). He appeared in six playoff games with the Moose during the 2008 AHL playoffs, recording one assist.

=== Professional ===
==== Ottawa Senators ====
In the 2008–09 season, Smith signed an entry-level contract with the Ottawa Senators and attended the team's training camp. He played with the team until September 21, when he was demoted to Ottawa's AHL affiliate, the Binghamton Senators. He was the final cut made by the Senators in the pre-season. He made his NHL debut as an emergency call-up for a November 29, 2008, game against the New York Islanders, registering no points.

On January 16, 2010, he scored his first NHL goal, against Carey Price of the Montreal Canadiens. Smith would play in all six of Ottawa's 2010 Stanley Cup playoff games as the Senators were defeated by the defending Stanley Cup champion and fourth-seeded Pittsburgh Penguins.

On May 20, 2011, Ottawa signed Smith to a two-year, one-way contract. He spent the 2011–12 season with Ottawa, registering 14 goals and 26 points in 81 games, while also appearing in all seven of Ottawa's 2012 playoff games, registering one assist before as the Senators were eliminated by the top-seeded New York Rangers in the Eastern Conference Quarterfinal.

On 5 September 2012, it was announced Smith signed a four-year contract with the Senators worth an average annual value of $1,887,500. Smith would appear in all 48 games of the lockout-shortened 2012–13 season, scoring 4 goals and 11 assists, and would score a goal and an assist in all 10 games during the 2013 playoffs before Ottawa was eliminated by the top-seeded Pittsburgh Penguins in the Eastern Conference Semifinal.

Smith appeared in all 82 games of the 2013–14 season, scoring 13 goals and nine assists as Ottawa failed to qualify for the 2014 playoffs.

Smith missed most of the 2014–15 season due to dislocating a wrist after a collision with the Boston Bruins' Brad Marchand on December 13, 2014. He would return to the ice later in the season and was moved across the lines by then head coach Paul MacLean to try to improve Smith's performance, including switching Smith from a winger to a centre. He would end the season with 2 goals and 1 assist in 37 games. He would also appear in three games during the 2015 playoffs in the Eastern Conference Quarterfinal against the Montreal Canadiens, which the Senators lost in six games.

Smith's performance drastically improved during the 2015–16 season, where he appeared in 81 games and achieved career highs in goals (25) and points (36). Early in the season, he anticipated having a productive season due to improving his skating during his off time from his wrist injury that occurred in the previous season. Smith also believed his improved performance was due to playing on the top line with Mark Stone and Jean-Gabriel Pageau and by new head coach Dave Cameron's decision to move Smith from the fourth line centre to the first line left winger. Smith was also nominated for the 2015–16 Bill Masterton Memorial Trophy for his "perseverance and dedication to hockey".

==== Chicago Blackhawks ====
Having completed his 11th season with the Senators organization in the 2018–19 season, Smith's tenure with Ottawa ended after he was traded to the Chicago Blackhawks in exchange for Artem Anisimov on July 16, 2019.

In his first season away from the Senators, Smith began the 2019–20 season on the Blackhawks' fourth-line, making his debut on opening night against the Philadelphia Flyers on October 4, 2019. He was scoreless in his first 10 games with Chicago before collecting two assists on goals by Kirby Dach and Calvin de Haan against the Vegas Golden Knights on November 13. Smith made 50 appearances with the Blackhawks, posting four goals and 11 points, before suffering a cut from a skate blade to his hand against the Vancouver Canucks on February 12, 2020. It was later announced that Smith would miss the remainder of the season, due to a back injury requiring surgery on March 6.

Smith announced his retirement from the NHL on September 17, 2021.

== Personal life ==
Smith is the nephew of former NHL player Barry Dean.

== Career statistics ==
			Regular season					Playoffs
Season	Team	League	GP	G	A	Pts	PIM	GP	G	A	Pts	PIM
2004–05	Swift Current Broncos	WHL	14	1	1	2	0	—	—	—	—	—
2005–06	Swift Current Broncos	WHL	64	2	5	7	78	3	0	0	0	9
2006–07	Swift Current Broncos	WHL	71	16	15	31	130	6	0	2	2	11
2007–08	Swift Current Broncos	WHL	72	22	48	70	136	12	5	5	10	29
2007–08	Manitoba Moose	AHL	—	—	—	—	—	6	0	1	1	0
2008–09	Binghamton Senators	AHL	79	24	24	48	132	—	—	—	—	—
2008–09	Ottawa Senators	NHL	1	0	0	0	0	—	—	—	—	—
2009–10	Binghamton Senators	AHL	68	14	27	41	100	—	—	—	—	—
2009–10	Ottawa Senators	NHL	15	2	1	3	14	6	0	0	0	5
2010–11	Binghamton Senators	AHL	22	7	5	12	32	23	8	12	20	36
2010–11	Ottawa Senators	NHL	55	4	5	9	120	—	—	—	—	—
2011–12	Ottawa Senators	NHL	81	14	12	26	98	7	0	1	1	10
2012–13	Ottawa Senators	NHL	48	4	11	15	56	10	1	1	2	31
2013–14	Ottawa Senators	NHL	82	13	9	22	111	—	—	—	—	—
2014–15	Ottawa Senators	NHL	37	2	1	3	18	3	0	0	0	0
2014–15	Binghamton Senators	AHL	2	1	1	2	1	—	—	—	—	—
2015–16	Ottawa Senators	NHL	81	25	11	36	80	—	—	—	—	—
2016–17	Ottawa Senators	NHL	74	16	16	32	61	19	1	5	6	12
2017–18	Ottawa Senators	NHL	68	5	14	19	54	—	—	—	—	—
2018–19	Ottawa Senators	NHL	70	9	19	28	81	—	—	—	—	—
2019–20	Chicago Blackhawks	NHL	50	4	7	11	29	—	—	—	—	—
NHL totals			662	98	106	204	722	45	2	7	9	58
