= Jarod Palmer =

American ice hockey player

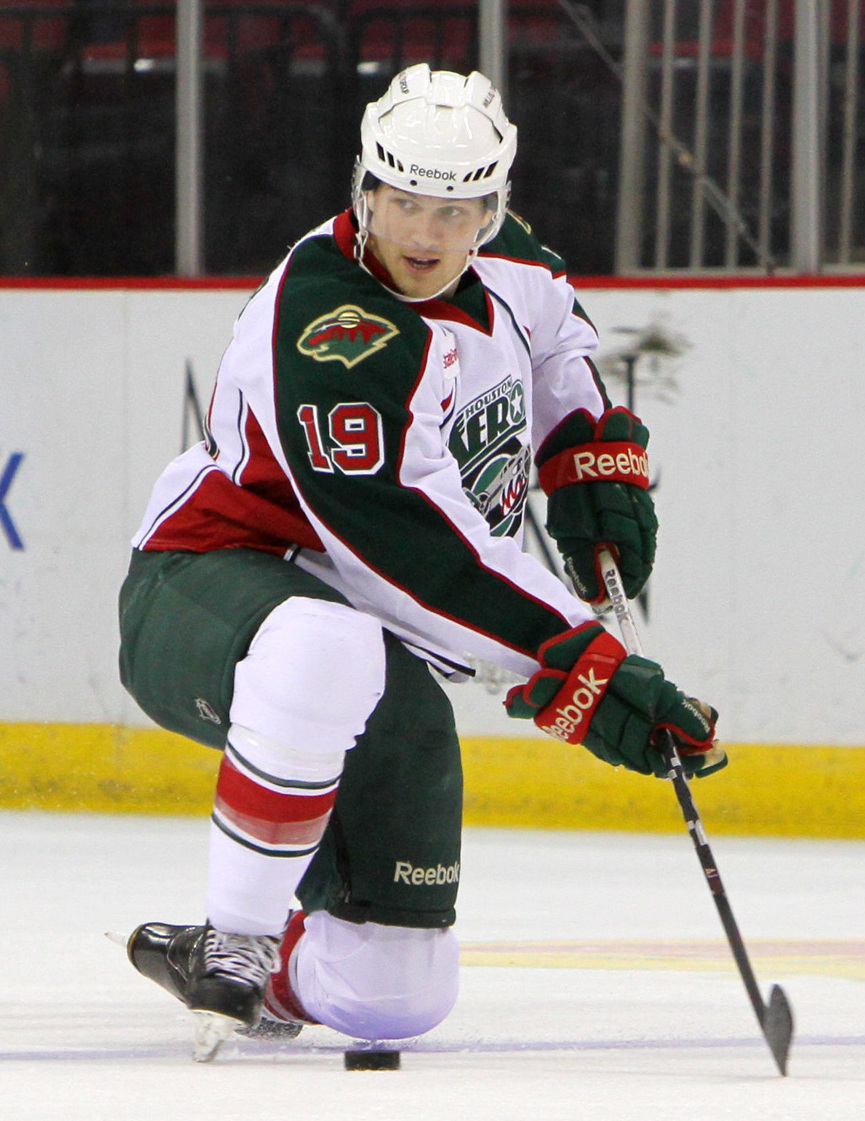
- Palmer with the Houston Aeros in 2012
- Born: February 10, 1986 (age 40) Fridley, Minnesota, U.S.
- Height: 6 ft 1 in (185 cm)
- Weight: 200 lb (91 kg; 14 st 4 lb)
- Position: Right Wing
- Shot: Right
- Played for: Minnesota Wild
- National team: United States
- NHL draft: Undrafted
- Playing career: 2010–2013

Jarod James Palmer (born February 10, 1986) is an American former professional ice hockey forward who played with the Minnesota Wild of the National Hockey League. He is a native of Fridley, Minnesota, and an alum of the USNTDP, where he played for two seasons. Palmer was a member of the silver medal-winning U.S. squad at the World Under-18 Championship in 2004. After graduating from high school, he spent two seasons in the USHL with the Tri-City Storm. Palmer then completed four years of collegiate hockey at Miami University in Oxford, Ohio. He made his NHL debut with the Wild on December 17, 2011.

== Playing career ==
=== Prep/Junior ===
Palmer played for two seasons at Fridley High School, beginning as an eighth grader. He spent his sophomore campaign at Spring Lake Park High School, where he teamed with future St. Louis Blues captain, David Backes. Subsequently, Palmer was selected to the U.S. National Team Development Program, and played for two seasons, appearing in 108 games. His greatest individual honor as a prep came in the 2004 World Championship semi-final game versus Czech Republic, where Palmer won player of the game honors. Later, his team went on to win the silver medal at the World Under-18 Championship in Belarus.

After two years with the USNTDP, Palmer joined the Tri-City Storm from 2004–2006 and appeared in 110 games. In his first year with the Storm, Palmer recorded 41 points on 15 goals and 26 assists. In his second year, he finished with 53 points, scoring 15 goals and 37 assists. He holds the team record for fastest goal to start a game, scoring 9 seconds in. He was named captain of the Storm for the 2005-06 season.

=== College ===
Palmer was recruited to play for Miami University. He suited up for the Redhawks from 2006–2010 and appeared in all 169 games during his career, setting the school record. He competed in the 2009 NCAA National Championship game as a junior. In his freshman season in 2006-07, he played in all 42 games posting 30 points with 11 goals and 19 assists. He was named CCHA Rookie of the Week on Dec. 12 and was awarded Miami's Rookie of the Year Award.

In 2007-08, he played in all 42 games producing 35 points with 10 goals and 25 assists. He was again honored with a CCHA award, this time as the Offensive Player of the Week.

His junior season in 2008-09, concluded with the NCAA National Championship game. The Redhawks were defeated in overtime 4-3, by Boston University. Palmer appeared in all 41 games and tallied 8 goals and 19 assists for 27 points.

Following the stunning defeat in the 2009 NCAA title game, Palmer returned for his senior year in 2009-10. He again played in all 44 games and lead the team in scoring with 45 points. He was named to the 2010 CCHA First-Team and was a two-time recipient of the league's Offensive Player of the Week honors.

=== Professional ===
On April 24, 2010, Palmer signed an entry-level contract as a free agent with the Minnesota Wild. He made his NHL debut for his hometown Wild on December 17, 2011, versus the New York Islanders. He recorded 6 shots on goal and finished with an even plus/minus rating. His first NHL goal occurred on Thursday December 29, 2011 against Nikolai Khabibulin of the Edmonton Oilers; time of the goal was 10:02 of the second period. Later in the same game, Palmer suffered a concussion which effectively ended his season with the Wild.

Palmer re-signed with the Wild as a restricted free agent to a one-year contract for the 2012–13 season. He was reassigned to Houston and was limited to only 17 games, producing 8 points, throughout the season due to lingering injury.

Following the season, Palmer opted to retire from professional hockey and on July 25, 2013, was announced as the inaugural head coach of the Sugar Land Imperials of the major junior NA3HL.

== Personal life ==
Born in Fridley, Minnesota. As an eighth grader, played varsity hockey for Fridley High School alongside his older sister and older brother. Graduated with honors from Pioneer High School in Ann Arbor, Michigan while playing for the USNTDP. In 2010, Palmer completed an interdisciplinary business degree in Entrepreneurship, graduating with honors from the Farmer School of Business at Miami University. Palmer married in the summer of 2011, and resides in Minnesota. He is the youngest son of coach Jeff and Charlene Palmer.

== Career statistics ==
=== Regular season and playoffs ===
			Regular season					Playoffs
Season	Team	League	GP	G	A	Pts	PIM	GP	G	A	Pts	PIM
2002–03	U.S. National Under-18 Team	NAHL	33	3	7	10	39	—	—	—	—	—
2003–04	U.S. National Under-18 Team	NAHL	54	8	11	19	37	—	—	—	—	—
2004–05	Tri-City Storm	USHL	52	15	26	41	67	9	1	0	1	14
2005–06	Tri-City Storm	USHL	58	15	37	52	91	5	1	1	2	9
2006–07	Miami Redhawks	CCHA	42	11	19	30	26	—	—	—	—	—
2007–08	Miami Redhawks	CCHA	42	10	25	35	32	—	—	—	—	—
2008–09	Miami Redhawks	CCHA	41	8	19	27	34	—	—	—	—	—
2009–10	Miami Redhawks	CCHA	44	18	27	45	40	—	—	—	—	—
2010–11	Houston Aeros	AHL	65	9	19	28	64	24	3	2	5	7
2011–12	Houston Aeros	AHL	35	5	6	11	27	—	—	—	—	—
2011–12	Minnesota Wild	NHL	6	1	0	1	4	—	—	—	—	—
2012–13	Houston Aeros	AHL	17	2	6	8	26	—	—	—	—	—
2015–16	Allen Americans	ECHL	3	0	0	0	2	—	—	—	—	—
NHL totals			6	1	0	1	4	—	—	—	—	—

Medal record

Representing United States

Ice hockey

IIHF U18 Championships
Silver medal – second place	2004 Minsk	

=== International ===
Year	Team	Comp	GP	G	A	Pts	PIM
2004	United States	WJC18	6	1	1	2	0
Junior int'l totals			6	1	1	2	0

== Awards and achievements ==
Award	Year
All-CCHA First Team	2009-10
