= Mike Bartlett (ice hockey) =

American ice hockey player

- Born: January 6, 1985 (age 41) Morton Grove, Illinois, U.S.
- Height: 6 ft 0 in (183 cm)
- Weight: 190 lb (86 kg; 13 st 8 lb)
- Position: Right wing
- Shot: Right
- Played for: Lake Erie Monsters; Milwaukee Admirals; Houston Aeros; Binghamton Senators; HC TWK Innsbruck; Frederikshavn White Hawks
- NHL draft: Undrafted
- Playing career: 2007–2014

Mike Bartlett (born January 6, 1985) is an American former professional ice hockey player who last played for Danish club, Frederikshavn White Hawks of the Metal Ligaen.

== Career ==
In the 2011–12 season, Bartlett played primarily in the American Hockey League with the Binghamton Senators, posting 7 points in 58 games. On August 5, 2012, Bartlett signed his first European contract on a one-year deal with Austrian club, HC Innsbruck of the EBEL. In the following season, Bartlett returned to Europe signing a contract after a successful try-out with the Frederikshavn White Hawks of Denmark.

== Personal life ==
Bartlett is married to college softball head coach Megan Bartlett.

== Career statistics ==
=== Regular season and playoffs ===
			Regular season					Playoffs
Season	Team	League	GP	G	A	Pts	PIM	GP	G	A	Pts	PIM
2001–02	U.S. National Development Team	NAHL	46	9	8	17	78	—	—	—	—	—
2002–03	U.S. National Development Team	NAHL	10	2	5	7	16	—	—	—	—	—
2003–04	Notre Dame	CCHA	39	6	6	12	24	—	—	—	—	—
2004–05	Notre Dame	CCHA	38	2	6	8	52	—	—	—	—	—
2005–06	Notre Dame	CCHA	31	2	5	7	39	—	—	—	—	—
2006–07	Notre Dame	CCHA	42	3	8	11	24	—	—	—	—	—
2007–08	Arizona Sundogs	CHL	9	2	4	6	2	—	—	—	—	—
2007–08	Austin Ice Bats	CHL	42	17	26	43	34	3	0	2	2	6
2008–09	Johnstown Chiefs	ECHL	52	11	19	30	58	—	—	—	—	—
2008–09	Lake Erie Monsters	AHL	17	2	1	3	8	—	—	—	—	—
2009–10	Johnstown Chiefs	ECHL	30	10	15	25	33	—	—	—	—	—
2009–10	Lake Erie Monsters	AHL	41	6	4	10	10	—	—	—	—	—
2009–10	Charlotte Checkers	ECHL	—	—	—	—	—	7	2	3	5	2
2009–10	Milwaukee Admirals	AHL	—	—	—	—	—	4	0	1	1	0
2010–11	Milwaukee Admirals	AHL	72	8	10	18	47	13	2	3	5	8
2010–11	Cincinnati Cyclones	ECHL	6	1	1	2	6	—	—	—	—	—
2011–12	Houston Aeros	AHL	3	0	0	0	0	—	—	—	—	—
2011–12	Gwinnett Gladiators	ECHL	6	2	4	6	2	—	—	—	—	—
2011–12	Binghamton Senators	AHL	58	3	4	7	18	—	—	—	—	—
2012–13	HC TWK Innsbruck	EBEL	53	14	17	31	82	—	—	—	—	—
2013–14	Frederikshavn White Hawks	DEN	30	7	10	17	22	11	2	6	8	6
AHL totals			191	19	19	38	83	17	2	4	6	8

=== International ===
Year	Team	Event	Result	GP	G	A	Pts	PIM
2003	United States	WJC18	4th	6	0	2	2	30
Junior totals				6	0	2	2	30
