= Ray Kaunisto =

American ice hockey player

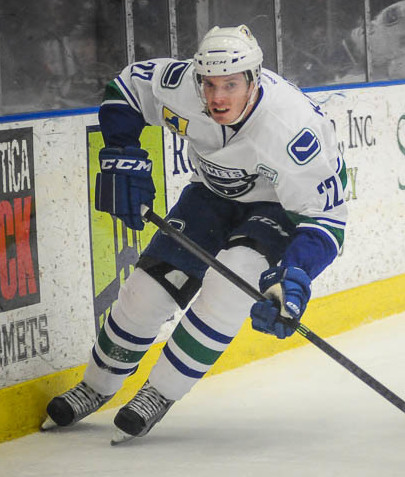
- Kaunisto with the Utica Comets in 2014
- Born: February 7, 1987 (age 39) Sault Ste. Marie, Michigan, U.S.
- Height: 6 ft 4 in (193 cm)
- Weight: 185 lb (84 kg; 13 st 3 lb)
- Position: Forward
- Shot: Left
- Played for: Manchester Monarchs; St. John's IceCaps; Syracuse Crunch; Lake Erie Monsters; Utica Comets
- NHL draft: Undrafted
- Playing career: 2010–2016

Ray Kaunisto (born February 7, 1987) is an American former professional ice hockey forward. He last played with the Brampton Beast of the ECHL.

== Playing career ==
He played hockey at Northern Michigan University from 2006 to 2010, along with his younger brother Kory Kaunisto. On March 31, 2010, he was signed as a free agent by the Los Angeles Kings to a two-year entry-level contract. After two seasons with Kings affiliate, the Manchester Monarchs, Kaunisto became an unrestricted free agent on June 20, 2012, when the Kings did not tender him a qualifying offer.

On August 21, 2013, Kaunisto signed with the AHL's St. John's IceCaps, an affiliate of the Winnipeg Jets. Kaunisto however spent the majority of the 2012–13 season, in the ECHL with lower tier affiliate, the Colorado Eagles.

On August 28, 2013, he signed as a free agent to a one-year ECHL contract with the Kalamazoo Wings.

During his second season with the Wings in 2014–15, and after appearing in 43 games, Kaunisto was traded to the Evansville IceMen on March 11, 2015. The following day he was moved onto the Florida Everblades to finish out the season.

In the 2015–16 season, Kaunisto was without a club. On February 6, 2016, he signed with the Brampton Beast to play a final professional game in the ECHL before announcing his retirement from professional hockey on February 8, 2016.

== Career statistics ==
			Regular season					Playoffs
Season	Team	League	GP	G	A	Pts	PIM	GP	G	A	Pts	PIM
2004–05	Soo Indians	NAHL	55	20	20	40	72	14	4	6	10	8
2005–06	Cedar Rapids RoughRiders	USHL	53	5	14	19	78	8	1	1	2	12
2006–07	Northern Michigan University	CCHA	41	3	0	3	30	—	—	—	—	—
2007–08	Northern Michigan University	CCHA	40	8	5	13	44	—	—	—	—	—
2008–09	Northern Michigan University	CCHA	40	7	7	14	56	—	—	—	—	—
2009–10	Northern Michigan University	CCHA	40	18	14	32	78	—	—	—	—	—
2010–11	Manchester Monarchs	AHL	57	8	6	14	50	7	2	1	3	4
2011–12	Manchester Monarchs	AHL	74	7	15	22	65	4	0	1	1	0
2012–13	St. John's IceCaps	AHL	1	0	0	0	0	—	—	—	—	—
2012–13	Colorado Eagles	ECHL	53	7	16	23	113	1	0	0	0	2
2013–14	Kalamazoo Wings	ECHL	34	2	10	12	46	6	0	0	0	2
2013–14	Syracuse Crunch	AHL	6	1	0	1	4	—	—	—	—	—
2013–14	Lake Erie Monsters	AHL	3	0	1	1	2	—	—	—	—	—
2013–14	Utica Comets	AHL	19	1	1	2	4	—	—	—	—	—
2014–15	Kalamazoo Wings	ECHL	43	5	9	14	76	—	—	—	—	—
2014–15	Florida Everblades	ECHL	14	5	7	12	12	10	1	0	1	8
2015–16	Brampton Beast	ECHL	1	0	0	0	0	—	—	—	—	—
AHL totals			160	17	23	40	125	11	2	2	4	4

== Awards and honours ==
Award	Year
College
CCHA All-Tournament Team	2010
