= Chad Rau =

American ice hockey player (born 1987)

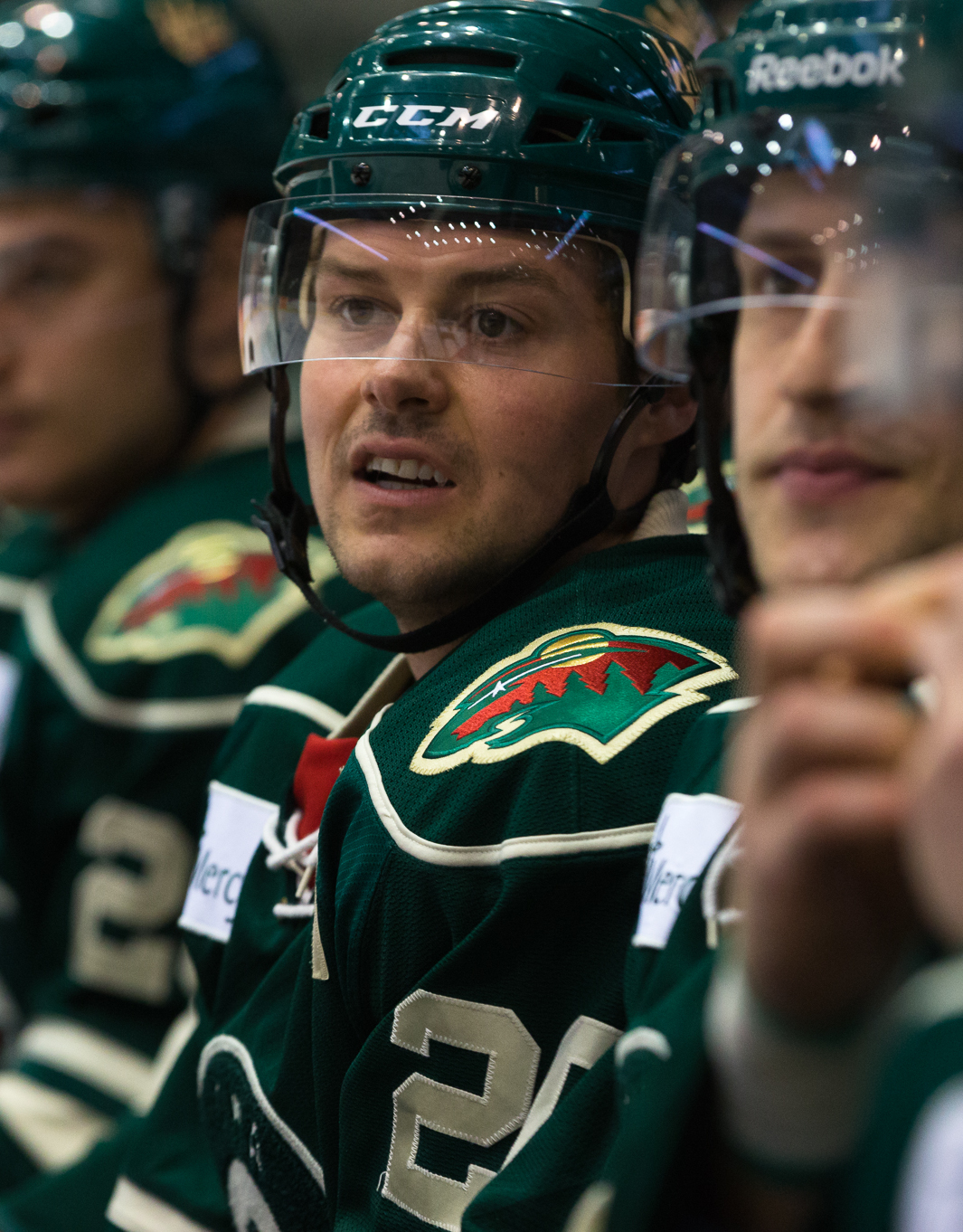
- Rau with the Iowa Wild in 2013
- Born: January 18, 1987 (age 39) Eden Prairie, Minnesota, U.S.
- Height: 5 ft 11 in (180 cm)
- Weight: 186 lb (84 kg; 13 st 4 lb)
- Position: Center
- Shot: Right
- Played for: Minnesota Wild; EHC Black Wings Linz; SaiPa; Kunlun Red Star; Neftekhimik Nizhnekamsk; Avangard Omsk; HC Slovan Bratislava; Glasgow Clan
- NHL draft: 228th overall, 2005; Toronto Maple Leafs
- Playing career: 2009–2020

Chad Anthony Jerome Rau (born January 18, 1987) is an American professional ice hockey forward who last played for Glasgow Clan in the UK's Elite Ice Hockey League. Rau previously played for HC Slovan Bratislava of the Kontinental Hockey League (KHL) and Minnesota Wild. He was selected by the Toronto Maple Leafs in the 7th round (228th overall) of the 2005 NHL entry draft.

== Playing career ==
He spent a single season in the USHL with the Des Moines Buccaneers in 2004–05, tallying 31 goals and 40 assists in 57 games, while receiving USHL Rookie of the Year honors. In 2014, he was inducted into the Buccaneers' Hall of Fame.

Rau attended Colorado College from 2005 to 2009, receiving All-America Second Team honors in 2008 and 2009.

On May 17, 2010, Rau was signed as a free agent by the Minnesota Wild to a two-year contract. He was assigned to play for the Houston Aeros at the start of the 2010–11 season.

During the 2011–12 season, he made his NHL debut with the Wild and scored his first NHL goal, the eventual game-winning goal, in a 5–2 victory against Kari Lehtonen of the Dallas Stars on January 21, 2012. On February 19, 2012, he scored his second NHL goal in his fifth NHL game.

On February 5, 2014, the Minnesota Wild traded Rau to the San Jose Sharks in exchange for Curt Gogol. He was immediately assigned to AHL affiliate, the Worcester Sharks.

After spending the first five seasons of his professional career primarily in the AHL, Rau opted to sign abroad on a one-year contract in the Austrian Hockey League with EHC Black Wings Linz on July 22, 2014. He played 24 games with the Black Wings, collecting three goals and four assists. He transferred to SaiPa of the Finnish Elite League (Liiga) on December 31, 2014. In his second year with SaiPa (2015–16), Rau amassed 30 goals and 19 assists in 66 Liiga contests and won the Aarne Honkavaara Trophy as the league's leading goalscorer as well as the Liiga Gentleman of the Year award.

After concluding his successful tenure in Finland, Rau opted to leave as a free agent and signed a one-year contract with new KHL entrant, HC Kunlun Red Star of China on July 22, 2016.

Following a single season with Kunlun, Rau left as a free agent to continue in the KHL by signing a one-year agreement with HC Neftekhimik Nizhnekamsk on May 10, 2017. After splitting the 2017–18 season, between Nizhnekamsk and Avangard Omsk, Rau continued in the KHL signing as a free agent on a one-year contract with Slovak-based, HC Slovan Bratislava, on August 3, 2018.

On 25 July 2019, Rau agreed a move to UK EIHL side Glasgow Clan.

== Personal ==
Chad's younger brother Kyle played NCAA hockey with the University of Minnesota and currently plays within the Minnesota Wild organization in the National Hockey League.

== Career statistics ==
=== Regular season and playoffs ===
			Regular season					Playoffs
Season	Team	League	GP	G	A	Pts	PIM	GP	G	A	Pts	PIM
2003–04	Eden Prairie High School	HS-MN	23	34	24	58		—	—	—	—	—
2004–05	Des Moines Buccaneers	USHL	57	31	40	71	32	—	—	—	—	—
2004–05	U.S. NTDP U18	USDP	11	2	0	2	2	—	—	—	—	—
2005–06	Colorado College	WCHA	42	13	17	30	8	—	—	—	—	—
2006–07	Colorado College	WCHA	39	14	17	31	4	—	—	—	—	—
2007–08	Colorado College	WCHA	40	28	14	42	8	—	—	—	—	—
2008–09	Colorado College	WCHA	38	18	19	37	6	—	—	—	—	—
2009–10	Houston Aeros	AHL	79	19	19	38	7	—	—	—	—	—
2010–11	Houston Aeros	AHL	60	13	27	40	12	24	6	3	9	2
2011–12	Houston Aeros	AHL	67	14	21	35	2	4	0	0	0	2
2011–12	Minnesota Wild	NHL	9	2	0	2	0	—	—	—	—	—
2012–13	Houston Aeros	AHL	60	16	11	27	6	5	1	2	3	0
2013–14	Iowa Wild	AHL	33	1	6	7	0	—	—	—	—	—
2013–14	Worcester Sharks	AHL	28	2	4	6	6	—	—	—	—	—
2014–15	EHC Black Wings Linz	EBEL	24	3	4	7	2	—	—	—	—	—
2014–15	SaiPa	Liiga	26	9	5	14	0	7	4	2	6	2
2015–16	SaiPa	Liiga	60	28	18	46	0	6	2	1	3	4
2016–17	Kunlun Red Star	KHL	60	20	20	40	6	5	1	1	2	0
2017–18	Neftekhimik Nizhnekamsk	KHL	30	10	3	13	4	—	—	—	—	—
2017–18	Avangard Omsk	KHL	14	2	1	3	0	5	0	0	0	2
2018–19	HC Slovan Bratislava	KHL	55	7	10	17	4	—	—	—	—	—
2019–20	Glasgow Clan	EIHL	43	12	24	36	10	—	—	—	—	—
AHL totals			327	65	88	153	33	33	7	5	12	4
NHL totals			9	2	0	2	0	—	—	—	—	—
KHL totals			159	39	34	73	14	10	1	1	2	2

=== International ===
Year	Team	Event	Result	GP	G	A	Pts	PIM
2005	United States	WJC18	1st place, gold medalist(s)	6	1	0	1	0
Junior totals				6	1	0	1	0

== Awards and honors ==
Award	Year
USHL
All-Rookie Team	2005
Rookie of the Year	2005
First All-Star Team	2005
College
WCHA First All-Star Team	2008, 2009
AHCA West Second-Team All-American	2008, 2009
Liiga
Aarne Honkavaara Trophy	2016
Raimo Kilpiö trophy	2016
