= Drew MacIntyre =

Canadian ice hockey player (born 1983)

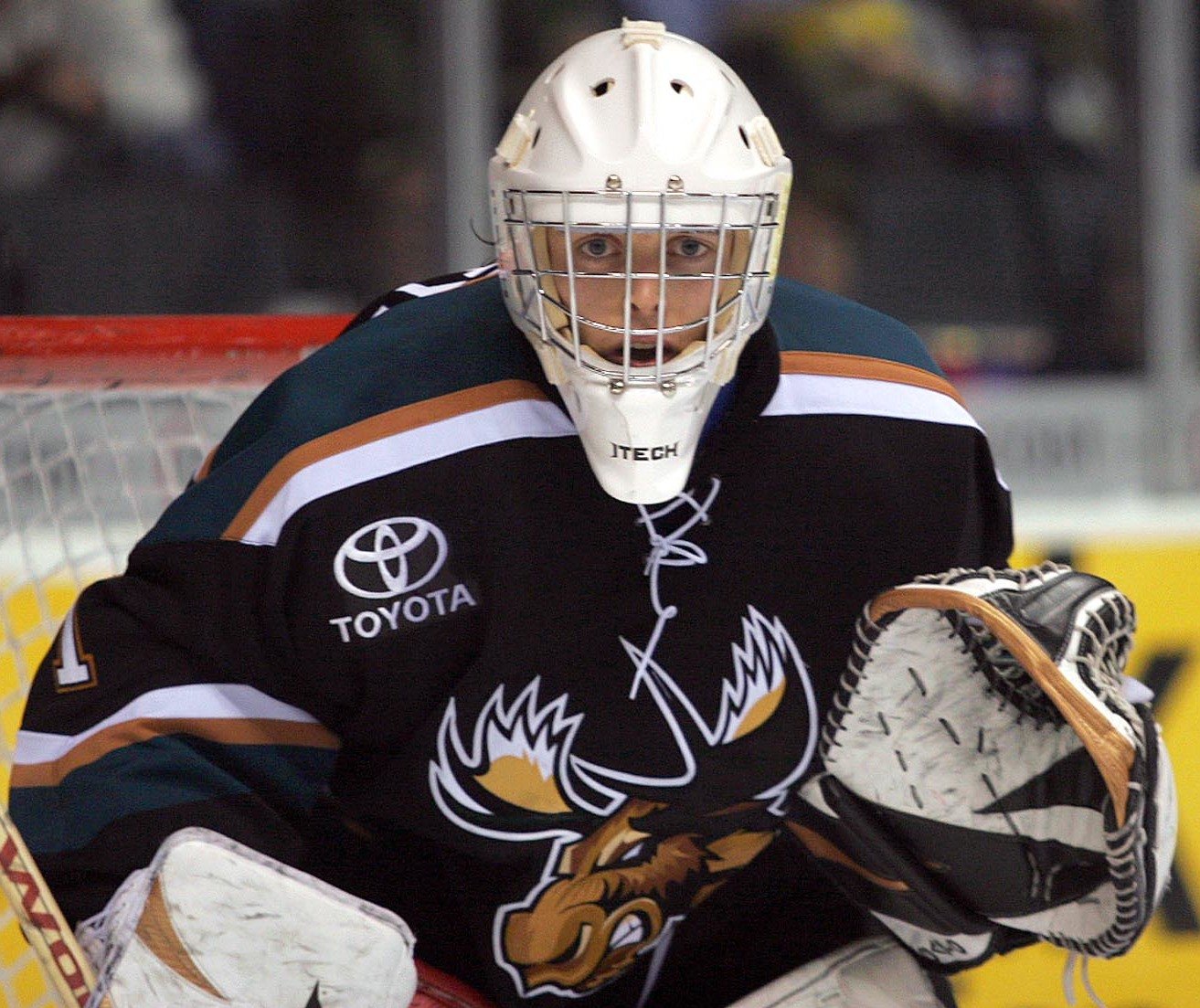
- MacIntyre with the Manitoba Moose in 2006
- Born: June 24, 1983 (age 43) Charlottetown, Prince Edward Island, Canada
- Height: 6 ft 1 in (185 cm)
- Weight: 190 lb (86 kg; 13 st 8 lb)
- Position: Goaltender
- Caught: Left
- Played for: Vancouver Canucks; Buffalo Sabres; HC Lev Praha; Toronto Maple Leafs; Adler Mannheim; Medvescak Zagreb; Straubing Tigers; HKM Zvolen; Nippon Paper Cranes; Oji Eagles
- NHL draft: 121st overall, 2001; Detroit Red Wings
- Playing career: 1999–2021

Medal record

Ice hockey

Representing Canada

Spengler Cup
Gold medal – first place	2015 Davos	
Gold medal – first place	2016 Davos	

Drew MacIntyre (born June 24, 1983) is a Canadian former professional ice hockey goaltender. As of 2021, he is a developmental goaltending coach and scout for the Winnipeg Jets in the National Hockey League.

== Playing career ==
MacIntyre played his entire junior hockey career in the Quebec Major Junior Hockey League with the Sherbrooke Beavers. Playing four seasons with Sherbrooke, from 1999–2000 to 2002–03, he recorded seven shutouts in 188 regular season games.

Following his second junior hockey season, MacIntyre was chosen in round four of the 2001 NHL entry draft by the Detroit Red Wings, 121st overall. He turned pro in 2002–03 with the Toledo Storm of the ECHL. He remained within the Red Wings' organization for four seasons, including several American Hockey League (AHL) call-ups to the Grand Rapids Griffins.

In the 2006 off-season, MacIntyre was traded to the Vancouver Canucks and subsequently spent the 2006–07 season with the team's AHL affiliate, the Manitoba Moose. MacIntyre set Moose regular-season franchise records with a 2.17 goals against average (surpassed by Cory Schneider in 2008–09) and a .922 save percentage (tied with Johan Hedberg, 1997–98), while posting a 24–12–2 record.

During the 2007–08 season, MacIntyre was called up by the Canucks on December 11, 2007, due to a minor injury to starting goaltender Roberto Luongo. Two days later, on December 13, MacIntyre made his NHL debut mid-way through the second period in relief of Canucks starter Curtis Sanford in a game against the San Jose Sharks. On January 29, 2008, MacIntyre made his second NHL appearance in relief of Sanford once more. He allowed one goal on 11 shots and picked up the loss in the Canucks' 4–3 defeat to the Stars. The two appearances marked his only NHL action during his tenure with the Canucks, recording a 2.95 goals against average and .864 save percentage.

After being sent back to the Moose, MacIntyre became the ninth AHL goaltender to score a goal with an overtime game-winner. During a game against the Chicago Wolves on February 20, 2008, the Wolves had pulled their goaltender on a delayed penalty in overtime when an errant pass from Wolves forward Steve Martins travelled the length of the rink into the Wolves' net. MacIntyre, being the last Moose player to touch the puck on a save, was credited with the goal. On February 27, MacIntyre was named the AHL Player of the Week, having stopped 98 out of 101 shots over three road starts with a 0.98 goals against average and his game-winner. MacIntyre completed his second season with the Moose with a 2.32 goals against average, .921 save percentage and 25-18-2 record, while sharing starts with Canucks' first-rounder Cory Schneider.

Becoming an unrestricted free agent in the 2008 off-season, MacIntyre agreed to terms with the Nashville Predators on a one-year deal on July 1, 2008. He played the entire year for the Milwaukee Admirals of the AHL, appearing in 55 games with an AHL career-high 34 wins.

The following off-season, MacIntyre signed with the Atlanta Thrashers on July 4, 2009. He was subsequently assigned to the team's AHL affiliate, the Chicago Wolves.

On February 28, 2011, MacIntyre was traded from the Atlanta Thrashers to the Montreal Canadiens in exchange for Brett Festerling.

MacIntyre signed a one-year contract with the Buffalo Sabres on July 7, 2011.

On February 13, 2013, MacIntyre signed a professional tryout contract with the Toronto Marlies of the American Hockey League. On April 2, 2013, Drew MacIntyre signed an NHL contract with the Toronto Maple Leafs for the remainder of the 2012–13 season.

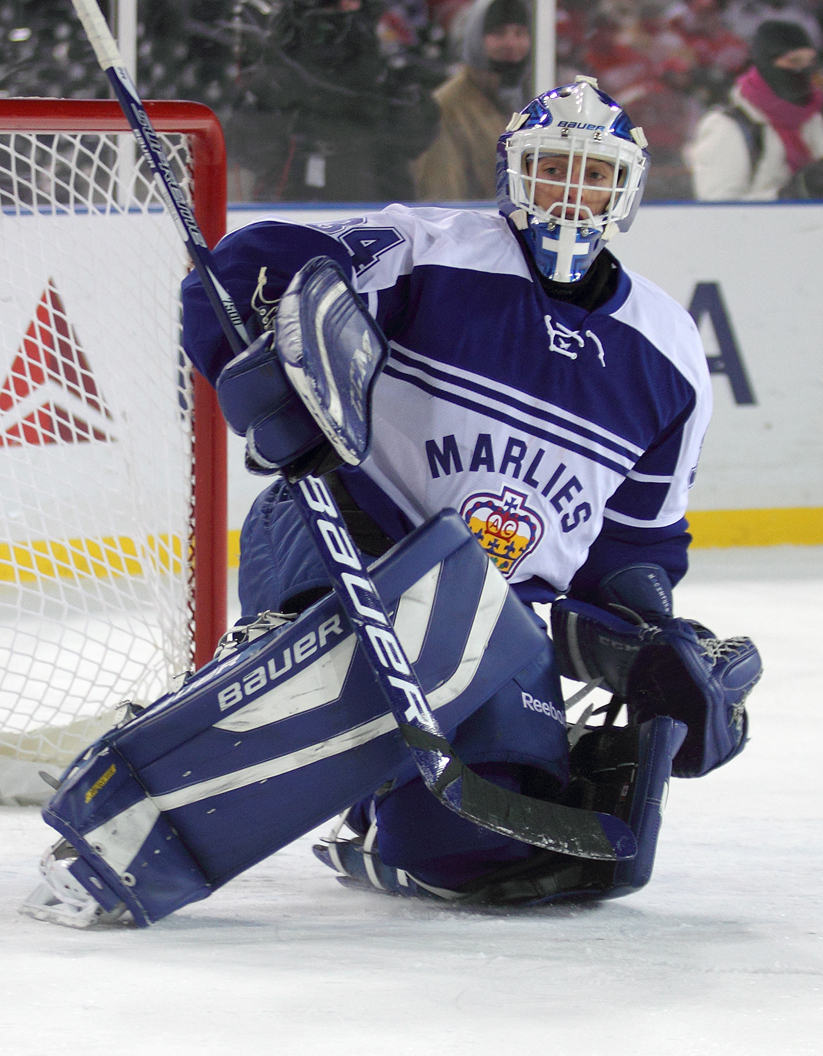
MacIntyre with the Toronto Marlies in 2013

On June 13, 2013, the Maple Leafs re-signed MacIntyre to a one-year, two-way contract. In the back end of the 2013–14 season on April 10, 2014, MacInytre started his first NHL game against the Florida Panthers.

MacInytre continued his journeyman path, signing as a free agent to a one-year two-way contract with the Carolina Hurricanes on July 1, 2014. In the 2014–15 season, he assumed the starting goaltender role with AHL affiliate, the Charlotte Checkers. In 51 games he collected 20 wins as the Checkers missed the post-season. On May 29, 2015, MacIntyre opted to remain within the Hurricanes organization, signing a one-year two-way contract extension.

In the following 2015–16 season, with the emergence of Hurricanes goaltender prospects, MacIntyre was dealt at the trade deadline to the Chicago Blackhawks in exchange for Dennis Robertson on February 29, 2016. MacIntyre was directly assigned to the AHL to help solidify the Rockford IceHogs. In December 2015, he represented Team Canada at the Spengler Cup and helped capture the title.

On April 27, 2016, MacIntyre opted to halt his North American career, embarking on a career abroad with a two-year deal with the Hamburg Freezers of the German top-flight Deutsche Eishockey Liga. However, shortly thereafter the Hamburg Freezers announced they had entered administration and ceased operations, returning MacIntyre to free agency. On September 7, 2016, having returned to North America, MacIntyre signed a professional try-out contract to attend the training camp of the Washington Capitals. After being released, he signed a deal with Medvescak Zagreb of the Kontinental Hockey League in October 2016. He played in 21 games for Zagreb with a 2.66 goals against average and a .925 save percentage. On January 8, 2017, he put pen to paper on a deal for the remainder of the season with Adler Mannheim of the Deutsche Eishockey Liga.

After starting the 2017–18 season with Medvescak Zagreb, he moved back to Germany in October 2017, signing with Deutsche Eishockey Liga outfit Straubing Tigers.

He officially retired from playing on April 1, 2021.

== Career statistics ==
=== Regular season and playoffs ===
			Regular season										Playoffs
Season	Team	League	GP	W	L	T	OTL	MIN	GA	SO	GAA	SV%	GP	W	L	MIN	GA	SO	GAA	SV%
1999–00	Sherbrooke Castors	QMJHL	24	10	7	2	—	1253	67	0	3.21	.900	—	—	—	—	—	—	—	—
2000–01	Sherbrooke Castors	QMJHL	48	17	22	3	—	2552	139	4	3.27	.902	4	0	4	238	19	0	4.79	.881
2001–02	Sherbrooke Castors	QMJHL	55	15	34	3	—	3028	201	1	3.98	.890	—	—	—	—	—	—	—	—
2002–03	Sherbrooke Castors	QMJHL	61	31	24	5	—	3515	161	2	2.75	.908	12	5	7	767	52	0	4.07	.854
2003–04	Toledo Storm	ECHL	11	6	4	0	—	574	25	1	2.61	.919	—	—	—	—	—	—	—	—
2004–05	Toledo Storm	ECHL	2	0	1	0	—	87	6	0	4.12	.850	—	—	—	—	—	—	—	—
2004–05	Grand Rapids Griffins	AHL	24	7	8	—	0	1048	47	1	2.69	.902	—	—	—	—	—	—	—	—
2005–06	Toledo Storm	ECHL	33	24	7	—	2	1981	68	2	2.06	.926	6	5	1	360	12	0	2.00	.924
2005–06	Grand Rapids Griffins	AHL	13	8	4	—	0	681	33	0	2.91	.897	5	3	1	260	7	0	1.62	.940
2006–07	Manitoba Moose	AHL	41	24	12	—	2	2290	83	3	2.17	.922	11	4	6	633	21	1	1.99	.928
2007–08	Manitoba Moose	AHL	46	25	18	—	2	2736	106	2	2.32	.921	1	1	0	31	2	0	3.93	.800
2007–08	Vancouver Canucks	NHL	2	0	1	—	0	61	3	0	2.95	.864	—	—	—	—	—	—	—	—
2008–09	Milwaukee Admirals	AHL	55	34	15	—	4	3180	122	4	2.30	.921	11	7	4	655	18	1	1.65	.931
2009–10	Chicago Wolves	AHL	41	20	17	—	2	2246	95	3	2.54	.917	5	1	2	228	11	1	2.90	.901
2010–11	Chicago Wolves	AHL	20	12	5	—	1	1135	55	0	2.91	.906	—	—	—	—	—	—	—	—
2010–11	Hamilton Bulldogs	AHL	21	12	6	—	2	1241	39	1	1.89	.938	20	11	9	1289	42	1	1.95	.930
2011–12	Rochester Americans	AHL	23	8	12	—	2	1375	73	1	3.19	.899	—	—	—	—	—	—	—	—
2011–12	Buffalo Sabres	NHL	2	0	0	—	0	43	1	0	1.38	.944	—	—	—	—	—	—	—	—
2012–13	HC Lev Praha	KHL	2	0	1	—	1	123	6	0	2.92	.891	—	—	—	—	—	—	—	—
2012–13	Reading Royals	ECHL	10	6	3	—	1	589	19	0	1.93	.931	—	—	—	—	—	—	—	—
2012–13	Toronto Marlies	AHL	21	13	5	—	3	1243	38	0	1.83	.931	9	5	4	527	25	1	2.85	.913
2013–14	Toronto Marlies	AHL	48	29	15	—	3	2866	121	1	2.53	.917	14	10	4	837	29	2	2.08	.941
2013–14	Toronto Maple Leafs	NHL	2	0	1	—	0	95	4	0	2.53	.922	—	—	—	—	—	—	—	—
2014–15	Charlotte Checkers	AHL	51	20	26	—	5	2935	139	0	2.84	.914	—	—	—	—	—	—	—	—
2015–16	Charlotte Checkers	AHL	28	11	13	—	1	1495	77	0	3.09	.890	—	—	—	—	—	—	—	—
2015–16	Rockford IceHogs	AHL	8	2	3	—	2	435	22	0	3.03	.895	—	—	—	—	—	—	—	—
2016–17	Medveščak Zagreb	KHL	8	3	5	—	0	451	21	0	2.79	.909	—	—	—	—	—	—	—	—
2016–17	Adler Mannheim	DEL	7	—	—	—	—	—	—	—	2.26	.919	4	—	—	—	—	—	2.49	.892
2017–18	Medveščak Zagreb	EBEL	5	—	—	—	—	—	—	—	2.36	.933	—	—	—	—	—	—	—	—
2017–18	Straubing Tigers	DEL	24	—	—	—	—	—	—	—	3.54	.897	—	—	—	—	—	—	—	—
2017–18	HKM Zvolen	SVK	12	—	—	—	—	—	—	—	2.12	.933	12	—	—	—	—	—	2.37	.913
2018–19	Nippon Paper Cranes	AL	2	—	—	—	—	—	—	—	0.50	.975	9	—	—	—	—	—	1.95	.926
2018–19	Oji Eagles	AL	35	—	—	—	—	—	—	—	1.88	.941	2	—	—	—	—	—	3.53	.881
NHL totals			6	0	2	—	0	199	8	0	2.41	.912	—	—	—	—	—	—	—	—
