= Nicolas Blanchard =

Canadian ice hockey player (born 1987)

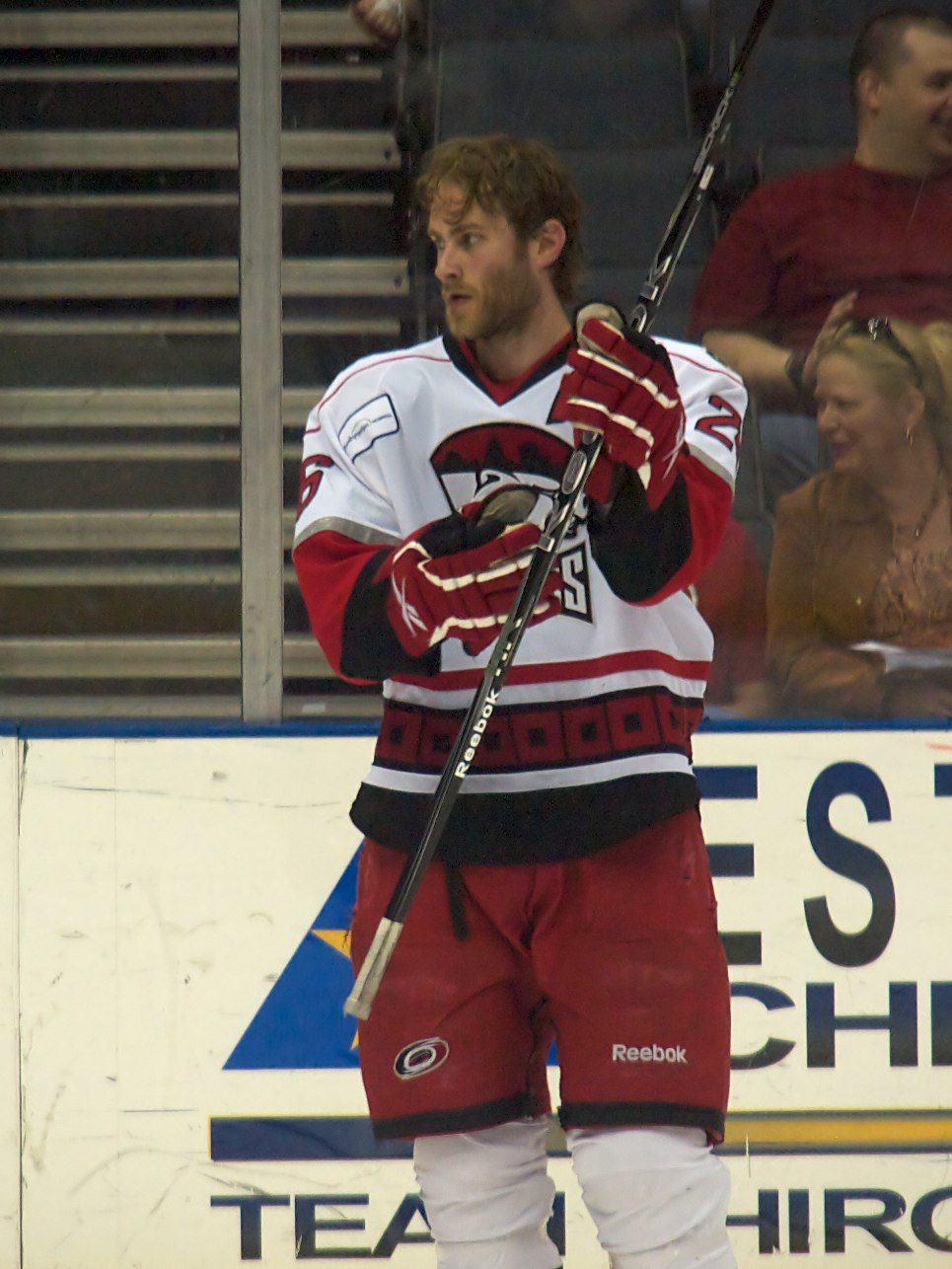
- Born: May 31, 1987 (age 39) Granby, Quebec, Canada
- Height: 6 ft 3 in (191 cm)
- Weight: 205 lb (93 kg; 14 st 9 lb)
- Position: Left wing
- Shot: Left
- Played for: Carolina Hurricanes
- NHL draft: 192nd overall, 2005; Carolina Hurricanes
- Playing career: 2007–2015

Nicolas Blanchard (born May 31, 1987) is a Canadian former professional ice hockey player who played in the National Hockey League with the Carolina Hurricanes. He was selected in the 6th round, 192nd overall, by the Hurricanes in the 2005 NHL entry draft.

== Playing career ==
Blanchard played junior hockey in the Quebec Major Junior Hockey League with the Chicoutimi Saguenéens and was signed to a three-year entry-level contract with the Hurricanes on March 4, 2007.

Blanchard while on the Albany River Rats was involved in a bus crash which took him to hospital in a serious condition and injured five members of the team.

Although Blanchard played 9 games with the Hurricanes during the 2012-13 NHL Season, he spent the rest of his career within the organization playing for its AHL affiliate (initially the River Rats, then the Charlotte Checkers).

After the 2013–14 season with the Checkers, Blanchard became an unrestricted free agent and did not re-sign with the team. He signed a one-year AHL contract with the St. John's IceCaps on October 9, 2014. In the 2014–15 season, Blanchard established a checking line role, contributing with 14 points in 63 games.

An un-signed free agent into the 2015–16 season, Blanchard belatedly signed a contract with the Norfolk Admirals of the ECHL on November 27, 2015. He featured in 4 games with the Admirals, before opting to end his professional career on December 7, 2015.

== Career statistics ==
			Regular season					Playoffs
Season	Team	League	GP	G	A	Pts	PIM	GP	G	A	Pts	PIM
2003–04	Collège Antoine–Girouard	QMAAA	42	24	28	52	28	13	9	6	15	4
2004–05	Chicoutimi Saguenéens	QMJHL	69	13	26	39	31	17	2	2	4	10
2005–06	Chicoutimi Saguenéens	QMJHL	60	15	29	44	51	9	1	2	3	4
2006–07	Chicoutimi Saguenéens	QMJHL	62	22	35	57	41	4	0	2	2	8
2006–07	Albany River Rats	AHL	7	1	2	3	2	5	0	0	0	2
2007–08	Albany River Rats	AHL	64	11	12	23	70	7	0	2	2	2
2008–09	Albany River Rats	AHL	55	7	12	19	132	—	—	—	—	—
2009–10	Albany River Rats	AHL	76	14	8	22	171	8	0	0	0	13
2010–11	Charlotte Checkers	AHL	72	8	10	18	101	16	2	3	5	16
2011–12	Charlotte Checkers	AHL	68	9	12	21	103	—	—	—	—	—
2012–13	Charlotte Checkers	AHL	61	4	5	9	124	3	0	1	1	7
2012–13	Carolina Hurricanes	NHL	9	0	0	0	20	—	—	—	—	—
2013–14	Charlotte Checkers	AHL	65	7	8	15	111	—	—	—	—	—
2014–15	St. John's IceCaps	AHL	63	3	11	14	81	—	—	—	—	—
2015–16	Norfolk Admirals	ECHL	4	3	1	4	4	—	—	—	—	—
2015–16	Saint–Georges Cool FM 103.5	LNAH	19	10	13	23	18	4	0	4	4	12
2016–17	Saint–Georges Cool FM 103.5	LNAH	26	4	18	22	43	12	2	0	2	13
AHL totals			531	64	80	144	895	39	2	6	8	40
NHL totals			9	0	0	0	20	—	—	—	—	—
