= Marco Rosa =

Canadian-born Italian ice hockey player

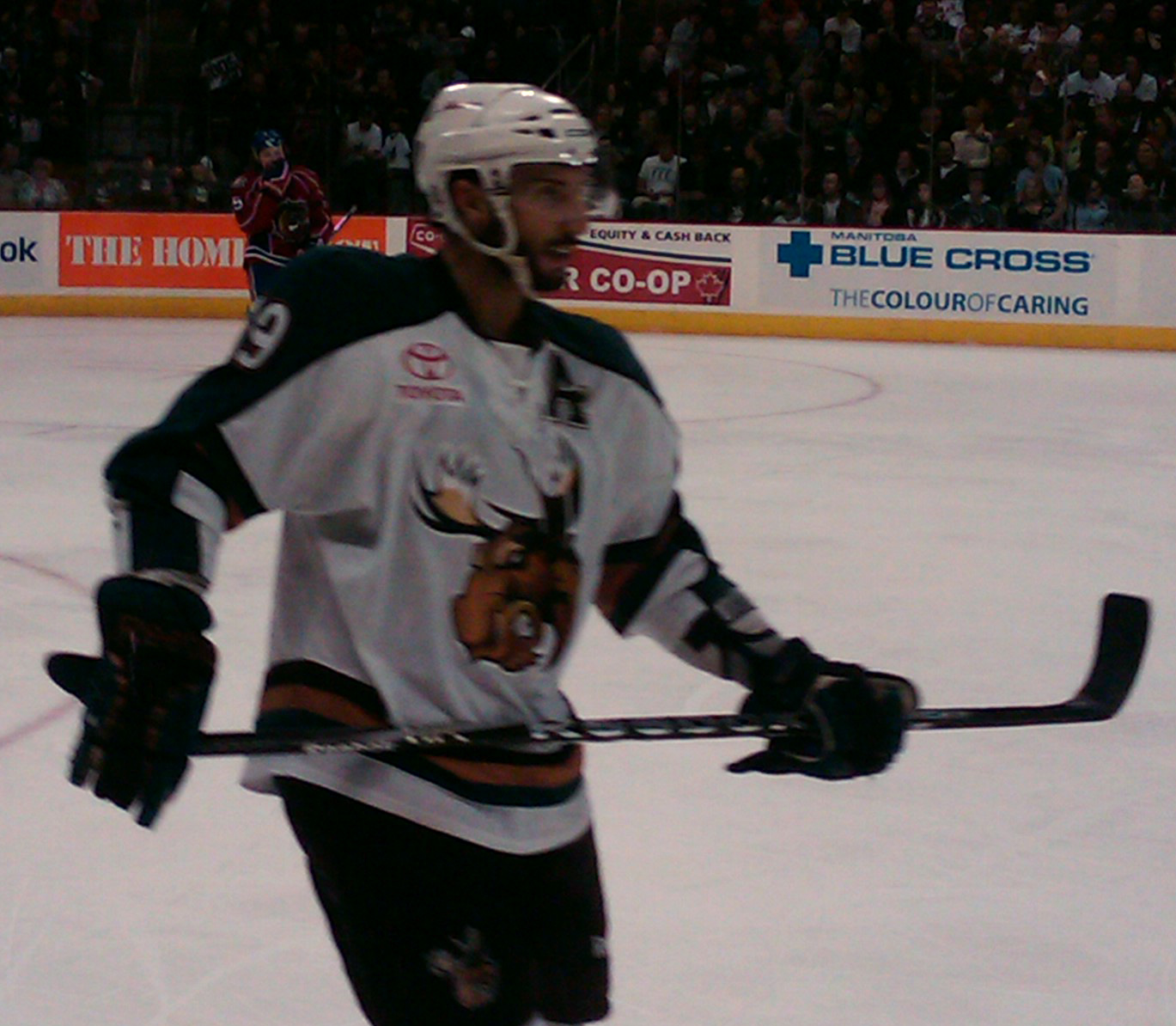
- Born: January 15, 1982 (age 44) Scarborough, Ontario, Canada
- Height: 6 ft 0 in (183 cm)
- Weight: 170 lb (77 kg; 12 st 2 lb)
- Position: Center
- Shot: Left
- AlHL team Former teams: Asiago; Milwaukee Admirals; Houston Aeros; Providence Bruins; Manitoba Moose; St. John's IceCaps; Espoo Blues; Grizzlys Wolfsburg; Krefeld Pinguine
- National team: Italy
- NHL draft: 255th overall, 2001; Dallas Stars
- Playing career: 2004–2021

Marco Rosa (born January 15, 1982) is a Canadian-born Italian professional ice hockey center who plays currently for Asiago of the Alps Hockey League. He was born in Scarborough, Ontario.

== Playing career ==
Rosa began his career by spending two seasons playing for the Wexford Raiders of the OPJHL. He then attended Merrimack College from 2000 to 2004. He was drafted in the 8th round of the 2001 NHL entry draft (255th overall) by the Dallas Stars.

Although his Junior season with Merrimack was cut short after his wrist was broken in a victory over Boston College in February 2003, as a Senior he rebounded to lead the team with 15 goals scored. Since graduating, he has played seven seasons in the ECHL and AHL. In the 2009–10 season, Rosa led the Manitoba Moose in scoring with 55 points.

In 2010, he played with the Vancouver Canucks in the pre-season, but was reassigned to the Moose before the regular season began.

On July 20, 2011, Rosa, along with three other former Manitoba Moose players, signed with the soon to be named St. John's IceCaps. The franchise, which moved from Manitoba, is an affiliate of the Winnipeg Jets.

On June 21, 2013, after his first season abroad in Europe with the Espoo Blues of the Finnish SM-liiga, Rosa signed a one-year contract in Germany with Grizzly Adams Wolfsburg of the DEL in Germany. He eventually stayed until 2016 and reached the DEL finals with Wolfsburg in the 2015–16 season, where they fell short to München. In June 2016, fellow DEL team Krefeld Pinguine announced to have signed Rosa for the 2016–17 campaign.

== Career statistics ==
=== Regular season and playoffs ===
			Regular season					Playoffs
Season	Team	League	GP	G	A	Pts	PIM	GP	G	A	Pts	PIM
1998–99	Wexford Raiders	OPJHL	42	12	13	25	35	—	—	—	—	—
1999–2000	Wexford Raiders	OPJHL	49	29	52	81	23	—	—	—	—	—
2000–01	Merrimack College	HE	33	6	18	24	22	—	—	—	—	—
2001–02	Merrimack College	HE	36	5	21	26	22	—	—	—	—	—
2002–03	Merrimack College	HE	30	10	12	22	26	—	—	—	—	—
2003–04	Merrimack College	HE	36	15	10	25	12	—	—	—	—	—
2004–05	Long Beach Ice Dogs	ECHL	72	34	31	65	59	6	0	2	2	4
2005–06	Long Beach Ice Dogs	ECHL	6	2	1	3	2	1	0	0	0	4
2005–06	Milwaukee Admirals	AHL	27	2	2	4	17	—	—	—	—	—
2006–07	Texas Wildcatters	ECHL	36	25	26	51	49	11	3	3	6	2
2006–07	Houston Aeros	AHL	5	1	1	2	4	—	—	—	—	—
2006–07	Providence Bruins	AHL	34	7	8	15	14	9	1	2	3	6
2007–08	Houston Aeros	AHL	56	10	17	27	20	5	2	0	2	0
2007–08	Texas Wildcatters	ECHL	8	5	8	13	0	—	—	—	—	—
2008–09	Houston Aeros	AHL	69	16	24	40	42	20	2	8	10	2
2009–10	Manitoba Moose	AHL	80	22	33	55	32	6	1	2	3	12
2010–11	Manitoba Moose	AHL	51	13	21	34	20	14	6	11	17	4
2011–12	St. John's IceCaps	AHL	31	6	21	27	12	9	0	1	1	4
2012–13	Blues	SM-liiga	43	9	9	18	36	—	—	—	—	—
2013–14	Grizzly Adams Wolfsburg	DEL	46	19	19	38	41	11	5	6	11	22
2014–15	Grizzly Adams Wolfsburg	DEL	52	9	37	46	18	11	3	5	8	8
2015–16	Grizzlys Wolfsburg	DEL	29	2	4	6	8	—	—	—	—	—
2016–17	Krefeld Pinguine	DEL	45	10	11	21	16	—	—	—	—	—
2017–18	Asiago Hockey 1935	AlpsHL	38	20	37	57	12	14	9	11	20	2
2017–18	Asiago Hockey 1935	ITA	1	1	1	2	2	—	—	—	—	—
2018–19	Asiago Hockey 1935	AlpsHL	39	17	33	50	20	4	1	2	3	12
2018–19	Asiago Hockey 1935	ITA	4	3	2	5	0	—	—	—	—	—
2019–20	Asiago Hockey 1935	AlpsHL	44	26	36	62	32	—	—	—	—	—
2019–20	Asiago Hockey 1935	ITA	6	2	5	7	0	—	—	—	—	—
2020–21	Asiago Hockey 1935	AlpsHL	30	20	25	45	10	11	1	8	9	2
2020–21	Asiago Hockey 1935	ITA	5	1	2	3	0	—	—	—	—	—
AHL totals			353	76	127	203	161	63	12	24	36	28
DEL totals			172	40	71	111	83	22	8	11	19	30
AlpsHL totals			151	83	131	214	74	29	11	21	32	16

=== International ===
Year	Team	Event	GP	G	A	Pts	PIM
2019	Italy	WC	7	1	0	1	8
2021	Italy	WC	1	0	0	0	0
Senior totals			8	1	0	1	8
