= Gabriel Bourque =

Canadian ice hockey player (born 1990)

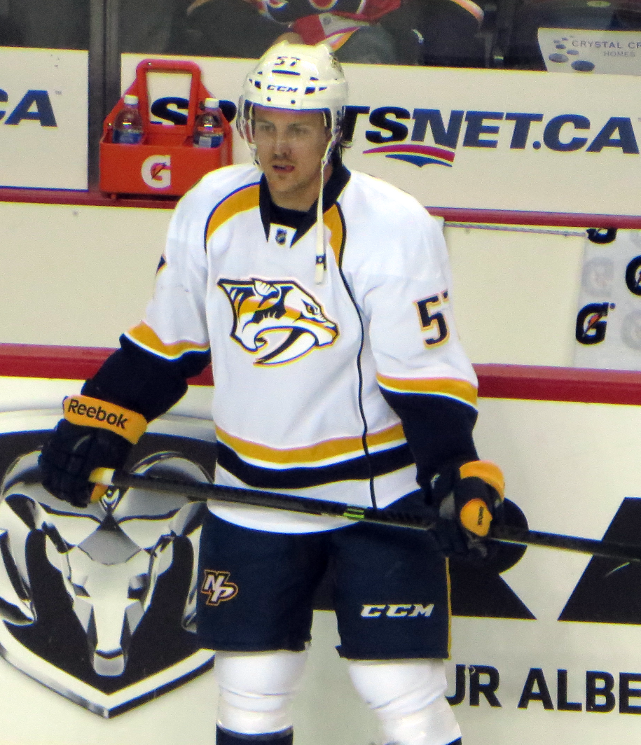
- Bourque with the Nashville Predators in 2014
- Born: September 23, 1990 (age 36) Rimouski, Quebec, Canada
- Height: 5 ft 10 in (178 cm)
- Weight: 206 lb (93 kg; 14 st 10 lb)
- Position: Left wing
- Shot: Left
- Played for: Nashville Predators; Colorado Avalanche; Winnipeg Jets
- NHL draft: 132nd overall, 2009; Nashville Predators
- Playing career: 2010–2024

Gabriel Bourque (born September 23, 1990) is a Canadian former professional ice hockey winger. He was selected in the fifth round, 132nd overall, by the Nashville Predators of the National Hockey League (NHL) in the 2009 NHL entry draft. Bourque also previously played for the Colorado Avalanche and Winnipeg Jets.

== Playing career ==
=== Early years ===
As a youth, Bourque played in the 2003 Quebec International Pee-Wee Hockey Tournament with the Baie-Comeau Petit Drakkar minor ice hockey team.

=== Junior ===
Bourque began his major junior ice hockey career with the Baie-Comeau Drakkar of the Quebec Major Junior Hockey League (QMJHL) during the 2007–08 season. In his final season of junior, Bourque was traded to the Moncton Wildcats on December 19, 2009. The Wildcats won the President's Cup by defeating the Saint John Sea Dogs in six games. Bourque was awarded the Guy Lafleur Trophy as playoff MVP, where he recorded 19 goals and 29 points.

=== Professional ===
==== Nashville Predators ====
Bourque was selected by the Nashville Predators of the National Hockey League (NHL) in the fifth round, 132nd overall during the 2009 NHL entry draft. On April 15, 2010, the Predators signed Bourque to a three-year, entry-level contract. Bourque spent his first professional season with the Predators' American Hockey League (AHL) affiliate, the Milwaukee Admirals. He played in 78 games with the Admirals, scoring 18 goals and 36 points. In his first playoff game with the Admirals, Bourque tied a team-record five points in a playoff game versus the Texas Stars.

Bourque played his first NHL game on December 28, 2011 against the Minnesota Wild and scored his first NHL career goal on January 5, 2012 against the Dallas Stars. On April 11, 2012, Bourque scored his first NHL Stanley Cup playoffs goal when the Predators beat the Detroit Red Wings in Game 1 of the Western Conference Quarter-Finals. He finished his rookie year with seven goals and 19 points in 43 games. He signed a two-year contract extension with the Predators on September 14, 2012. The following season, the NHL was shut down due to a lockout and Bourque began the season with Milwaukee. He suffered a knee injury in the AHL and was still going through rehab when the lockout ended. Bourque managed to get into 34 games with the Predators, scoring 11 goals and 16 points before re-injuring the same leg and ending his season. He played on a line with Patric Hornqvist and David Legwand. During the 2014–15 season, Bourque had three goals and 13 points in 69 games. As a restricted free agent at season's end, he accepted his qualifying offer of a one-year contract. In his fifth season within the Predators organization in 2015–16, Bourque was limited to just 22 games due to illness and injury. He was assigned to Milwaukee to recover from his injury on February 16. As a restricted free agent at the end of the season, Bourque was not tendered a qualifying offer to remain in Nashville, releasing him to free agency.

==== Colorado Avalanche ====
Unable to attain an NHL contract over the off-season, Bourque agreed to attend the Colorado Avalanche training camp on a professional tryout (PTO) contract on September 1, 2016. After a successful training camp and preseason, Bourque agreed to a contract with the Avalanche in signing a one-year, two-way deal on October 10, 2016. Bourque was placed on waivers and went unclaimed. Bourque split the 2016–17 season between Colorado and the San Antonio Rampage of the AHL. He spent the majority of the season with San Antonio, scoring 33 points in 61 games and getting into only six games with the Avalanche. On July 18, 2017, the Avalanche re-signed Bourque to a one-year extension. Bourque played 58 games for the Avalanche, recording five goals and 11 points. On May 24, 2018, the Avalanche re-signed Bourque to a one-year, $950,000 extension. A key penalty killer for the Avalanche, he appeared in 55 games scoring two goals and eight points in the 2018–19 season.

==== Winnipeg Jets ====
On August 26, 2019, Bourque signed a one-year, two-way contract with the Winnipeg Jets. In the 2019–20 season, Bourque made the opening night roster for the Jets out of training camp in a fourth-line specialist role. Bourque scored his first goal with the Jets in a 3-2 win over the San Jose Sharks on November 1, 2019. He missed four weeks due to a lower-body injury beginning in November. He returned December 10 in a 5–1 victory over the Detroit Red Wings. On February 6, 2020, Bourque played in his 400th NHL game, a 4–2 win over the St. Louis Blues.

==== Later years and retirement ====
As a free agent from the Jets, Bourque was without a contract for the entirety of the pandemic-delayed 2020–21 season. He would eventually return to the professional ranks, securing a one-year AHL contract with the Laval Rocket, the affiliate to the Montreal Canadiens on June 12, 2021. On July 17, 2022, Bourque was re-signed by the Rocket to a one-year contract extension, followed by yet another one-year extension with the team on July 12, 2023. He was named the fourth captain in Laval's history on October 9, 2023. In October 2024, after three seasons with the Rocket organization, Bourque announced his retirement from professional hockey.

== Career statistics ==
=== Regular season and playoffs ===
			Regular season					Playoffs
Season	Team	League	GP	G	A	Pts	PIM	GP	G	A	Pts	PIM
2005–06	Jonquière Élites	QMAAA	2	0	2	2	0	—	—	—	—	—
2006–07	Collège Notre-Dame du Sacré-Cœur	QMAAA	43	15	35	50	115	13	8	16	24	14
2007–08	Baie-Comeau Drakkar	QMJHL	65	10	18	28	38	5	0	0	0	0
2008–09	Baie-Comeau Drakkar	QMJHL	60	22	39	61	82	5	0	2	2	16
2009–10	Baie-Comeau Drakkar	QMJHL	30	13	25	38	61	—	—	—	—	—
2009–10	Moncton Wildcats	QMJHL	25	3	11	14	37	21	19	10	29	18
2010–11	Milwaukee Admirals	AHL	78	18	18	36	19	13	7	6	13	4
2011–12	Milwaukee Admirals	AHL	25	2	14	16	23	—	—	—	—	—
2011–12	Nashville Predators	NHL	43	7	12	19	6	10	3	2	5	4
2012–13	Milwaukee Admirals	AHL	15	7	5	12	4	—	—	—	—	—
2012–13	Nashville Predators	NHL	34	11	5	16	4	—	—	—	—	—
2013–14	Nashville Predators	NHL	74	9	17	26	8	—	—	—	—	—
2014–15	Nashville Predators	NHL	69	3	10	13	10	5	0	0	0	2
2015–16	Nashville Predators	NHL	22	1	3	4	18	—	—	—	—	—
2015–16	Milwaukee Admirals	AHL	4	0	0	0	0	—	—	—	—	—
2016–17	Colorado Avalanche	NHL	6	0	0	0	0	—	—	—	—	—
2016–17	San Antonio Rampage	AHL	61	10	23	33	20	—	—	—	—	—
2017–18	San Antonio Rampage	AHL	5	1	1	2	4	—	—	—	—	—
2017–18	Colorado Avalanche	NHL	58	5	6	11	12	6	2	0	2	0
2018–19	Colorado Avalanche	NHL	55	2	6	8	10	12	1	0	1	2
2019–20	Winnipeg Jets	NHL	52	2	4	6	7	3	0	0	0	0
2021–22	Laval Rocket	AHL	67	11	17	28	59	14	2	2	4	4
2022–23	Laval Rocket	AHL	66	14	17	31	26	2	0	0	0	0
2023–24	Laval Rocket	AHL	43	2	9	11	14	—	—	—	—	—
NHL totals			413	40	63	103	75	36	6	2	8	8

Medal record

Representing Canada

Ice hockey

World Junior Championships
Silver medal – second place	2010 Saskatoon	

=== International ===
Year	Team	Event	Result	GP	G	A	Pts	PIM
2010	Canada	WJC	2nd place, silver medalist(s)	6	3	6	9	4
Junior totals				6	3	6	9	4

== Awards and honours ==
Award	Year	Ref
QMJHL
President's Cup champion	2010	
Guy Lafleur Trophy	2010	
