= Tyler Weiman =

Canadian ice hockey player (born 1984)

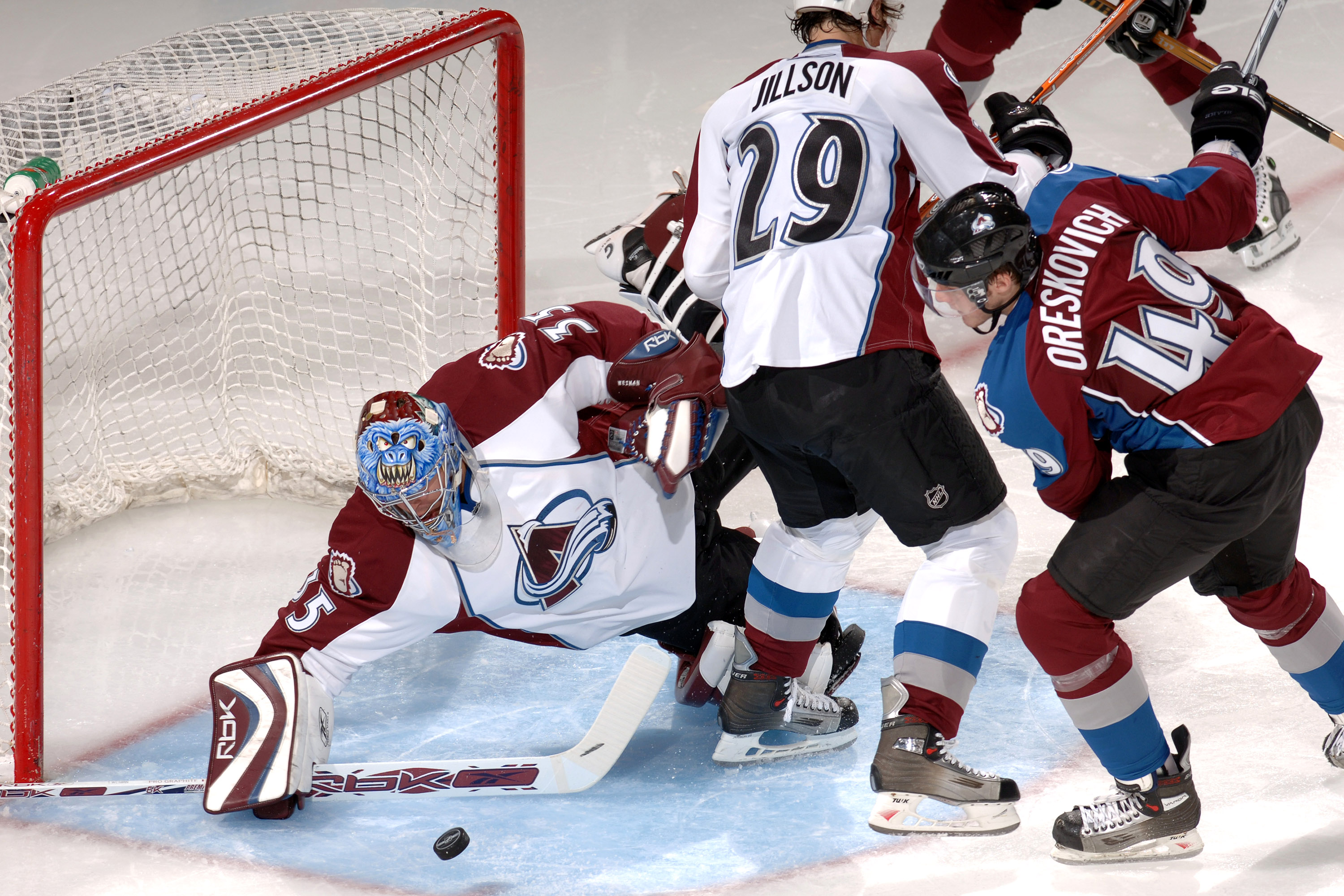
- Weiman with the Colorado Avalanche in 2007
- Born: June 5, 1984 (age 42) Saskatoon, Saskatchewan, Canada
- Height: 5 ft 11 in (180 cm)
- Weight: 192 lb (87 kg; 13 st 10 lb)
- Position: Goaltender
- Caught: Left
- Played for: Colorado Avalanche; Augsburger Panther; Thomas Sabo Ice Tigers; HC Pustertal Wölfe; Daemyung Killer Whales
- NHL draft: 164th overall, 2002; Colorado Avalanche
- Playing career: 2004–2018

Tyler Ray Weiman (born June 5, 1984) is a Canadian former professional ice hockey goaltender. He played one game in the National Hockey League (NHL) with the Colorado Avalanche.

== Playing career ==
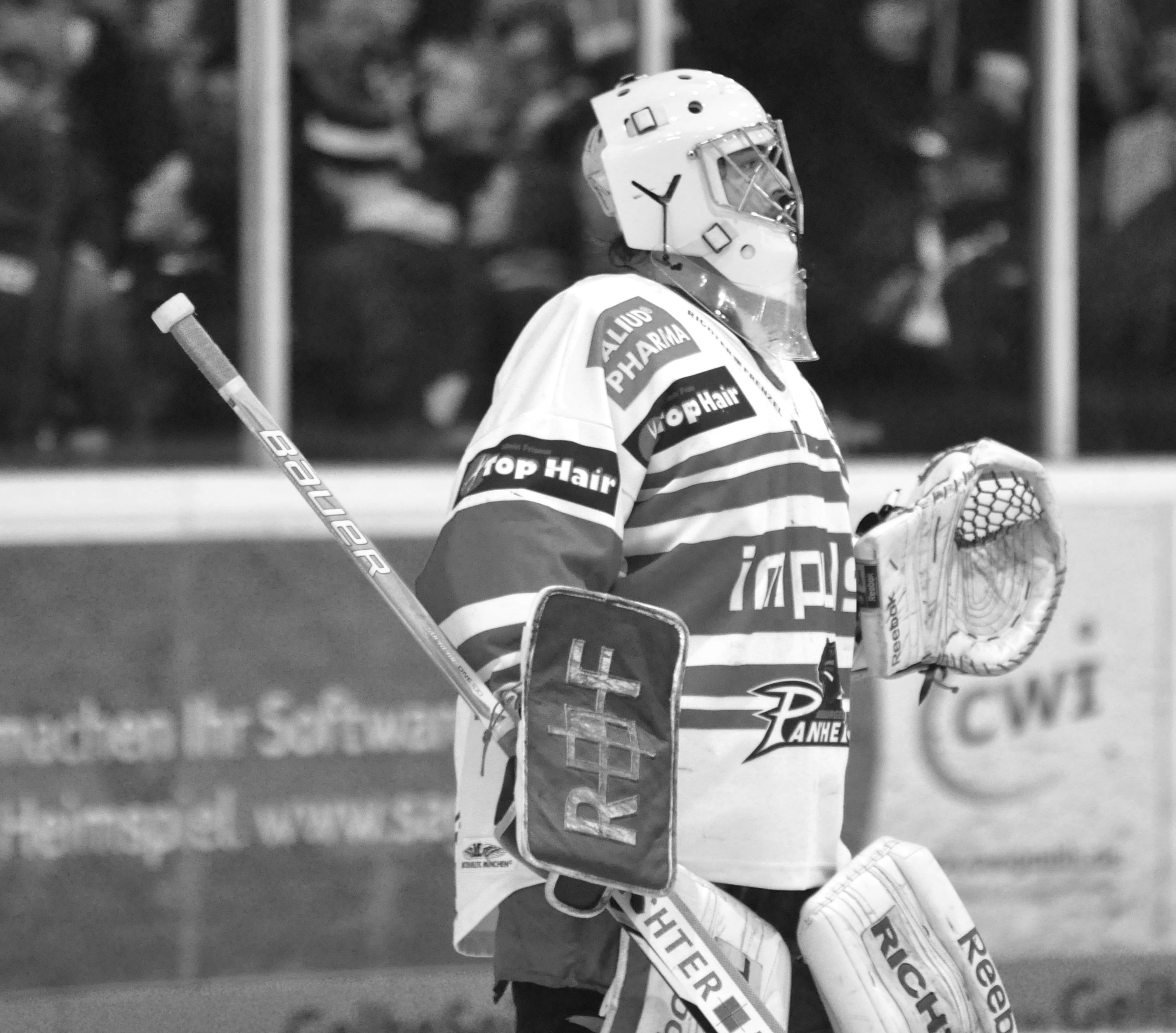
Weiman while with the Augsburger Panther in 2012

Weiman was born in Saskatoon, Saskatchewan. He was drafted 164th overall in the 2002 NHL entry draft by the Colorado Avalanche. He was drafted from the Tri-City Americans of the Western Hockey League and played for four years before leaving for the CHL where he won a Presidents Cup with the Colorado Eagles in 2005.

He made his professional debut in the 2005–06 season with Avalanche affiliate, the Lowell Lock Monsters of the AHL, and finished the season with the San Diego Gulls of the ECHL. In the 2006–07 season Tyler established himself as the starting keeper for the Albany River Rats.

Weiman started the 2007–08 season with the Colorado Avalanche after injury to José Théodore, and made his NHL debut on October 4, 2007, against the Nashville Predators in relief of starting goalie, Peter Budaj. He was then sent to new affiliate, the Lake Erie Monsters of the AHL, for the remainder of the season.

Weiman re-signed with the Avalanche to a one-year, two-way deal on July 14, 2008. He returned to Lake Erie for the 2008–09 season and performed strongly, appearing in the AHL All-Star game. He finished the season leading the AHL in shutouts (8) and leading the Monsters in wins (21).

In the 2009–10 season, Weiman was recalled from his starting position with the Monsters, to the Avalanche to briefly serve as Craig Anderson's backup when Peter Budaj was quarantined from the team after being diagnosed with the H1N1 virus on October 27, 2009. Weiman received his second call for the season after Anderson was injured in the December 2 game against the Florida Panthers late in overtime. He sat on the bench as Budaj's backup for four games.

On July 12, 2010, Weiman left the Avalanche and signed a one-year contract as a free agent with the Vancouver Canucks, and was later assigned to AHL affiliate, the Manitoba Moose, for the duration of the 2010–11 season.

On July 25, 2011, Weiman signed a one-year contract with European team, Augsburger Panther of the DEL. Weimen quickly established himself as one of the stand-out goalies in the German league, earning a two-year contract with the Nürnberg Ice Tigers of the DEL on March 28, 2012.

After two successful seasons with Thomas Sabo, Weiman opted to leave as a free agent and signed a one-year contract with DEL2 club, EV Landshut on July 11, 2014. After spending the following 2015–16 season in Italy with HC Pustertal Wölfe of the Serie A, Weiman continued his journeyman career in agreeing to a one-year deal with new Asia League entrant from South Korea, Daemyung Killer Whales on August 19, 2016.

== Personal ==
Weiman is a son-in-law of Simon Sochatsky, who is a former member of the Edmonton Investors Group (EIG), which owned the Edmonton Oilers.

== Career statistics ==
=== Regular season and playoffs ===
			Regular season									Playoffs
Season	Team	League	GP	W	L	OTL	MIN	GA	SO	GAA	SV%	GP	W	L	MIN	GA	SO	GAA	SV%
2000–01	Tri-City Americans	WHL	44	10	25	4	2464	155	0	3.77	.893	—	—	—	—	—	—	—	—
2001–02	Tri-City Americans	WHL	47	18	17	5	2492	149	2	3.59	.896	5	1	4	300	14	0	2.80	.917
2002–03	Tri-City Americans	WHL	55	16	34	2	3129	207	1	3.97	.882	—	—	—	—	—	—	—	—
2003–04	Tri-City Americans	WHL	54	23	21	7	3023	134	1	2.66	.913	5	1	2	234	11	0	2.82	.910
2004–05	Colorado Eagles	CHL	44	33	6	5	2630	79	8	1.80	.938	13	8	4	744	32	1	2.58	.918
2005–06	San Diego Gulls	ECHL	32	14	12	3	1797	84	1	2.81	.910	4	0	4	251	15	0	3.59	.895
2005–06	Lowell Lock Monsters	AHL	14	6	6	1	844	36	0	2.56	.913	—	—	—	—	—	—	—	—
2006–07	Albany River Rats	AHL	54	27	22	3	3047	152	2	2.99	.905	5	1	4	300	14	0	3.47	.889
2007–08	Lake Erie Monsters	AHL	31	9	19	1	1769	98	2	3.32	.903	—	—	—	—	—	—	—	—
2007–08	Colorado Avalanche	NHL	1	0	0	0	16	0	0	0.00	1.000	—	—	—	—	—	—	—	—
2008–09	Lake Erie Monsters	AHL	44	21	20	2	2559	105	8	2.46	.915	—	—	—	—	—	—	—	—
2009–10	Lake Erie Monsters	AHL	43	21	18	3	2538	105	3	2.48	.912	—	—	—	—	—	—	—	—
2010–11	Manitoba Moose	AHL	29	15	10	2	1717	75	1	2.62	.909	4	1	2	160	8	0	3.01	.896
2011–12	Augsburger Panther	DEL	40	23	17	0	2421	94	4	2.33	.932	2	0	2	111	6	0	3.24	.889
2012–13	Thomas Sabo Ice Tigers	DEL	44	21	22	0	2505	123	1	2.95	.906	—	—	—	—	—	—	—	—
2013–14	Thomas Sabo Ice Tigers	DEL	37	22	13	0	2161	100	4	2.78	.913	4	2	2	269	17	0	3.78	.852
2014–15	EV Landshut	DEL2	29	15	14	0	1744	80	2	2.75	.910	7	3	4	—	—	—	3.60	—
2015–16	HC Pustertal Wölfe	ITA	3	3	0	0	184	6	1	1.96	.948	15	—	—	—	—	—	2.30	.933
2016–17	Daemyung Killer Whales	ALIH	36	—	—	—	2442	154	0	4.44	.896	—	—	—	—	—	—	—	—
2017–18	Daemyung Killer Whales	ALIH	26	—	—	—	2436	68	0	2.76	.909	—	—	—	—	—	—	—	—
2018–19	Lacombe Generals	ACH	3	2	1	0	180	7	0	2.33	.910	—	—	—	—	—	—	—	—
NHL totals			1	0	0	0	16	0	0	0.00	1.000	—	—	—	—	—	—	—	—

== See also ==
- List of players who played only one game in the NHL
