= 2010 Calder Cup playoffs =

North American ice hockey tournament

Tournament details
- Dates: April 14 – June 14, 2010
- Teams: 16

Final positions
- Champions: Hershey Bears
- Runners-up: Texas Stars

The 2010 Calder Cup playoffs of the American Hockey League began on April 14, 2010. The sixteen teams that qualified, eight from each conference, played best-of-seven series for division semifinals, finals and conference finals. The conference champions, Hershey Bears and Texas Stars, played a best-of-seven series for the Calder Cup that was won by the Hershey Bears in six games. This was the second consecutive Calder Cup for the Bears and their 11th overall.

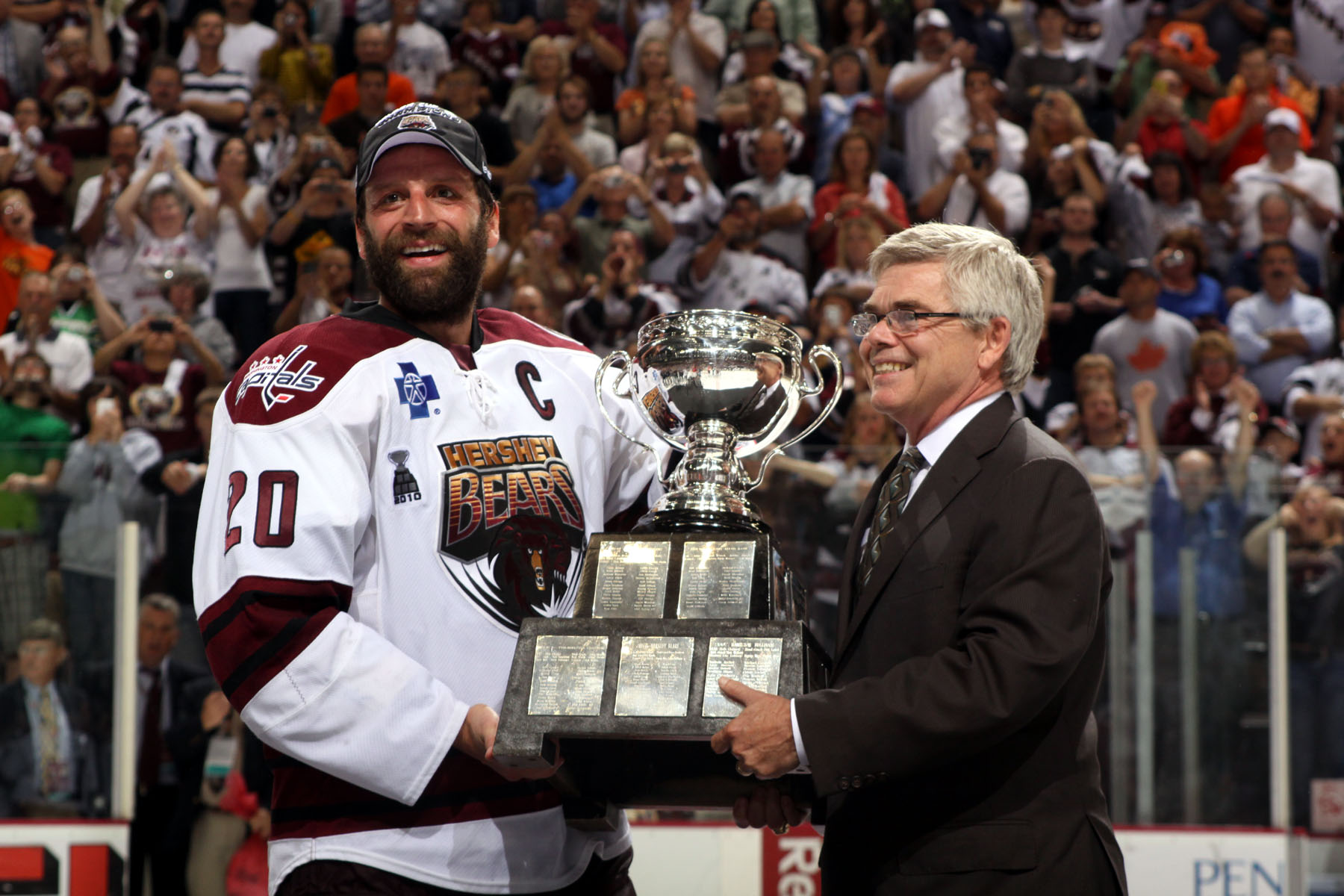
Team captain Bryan Helmer with the Calder Cup

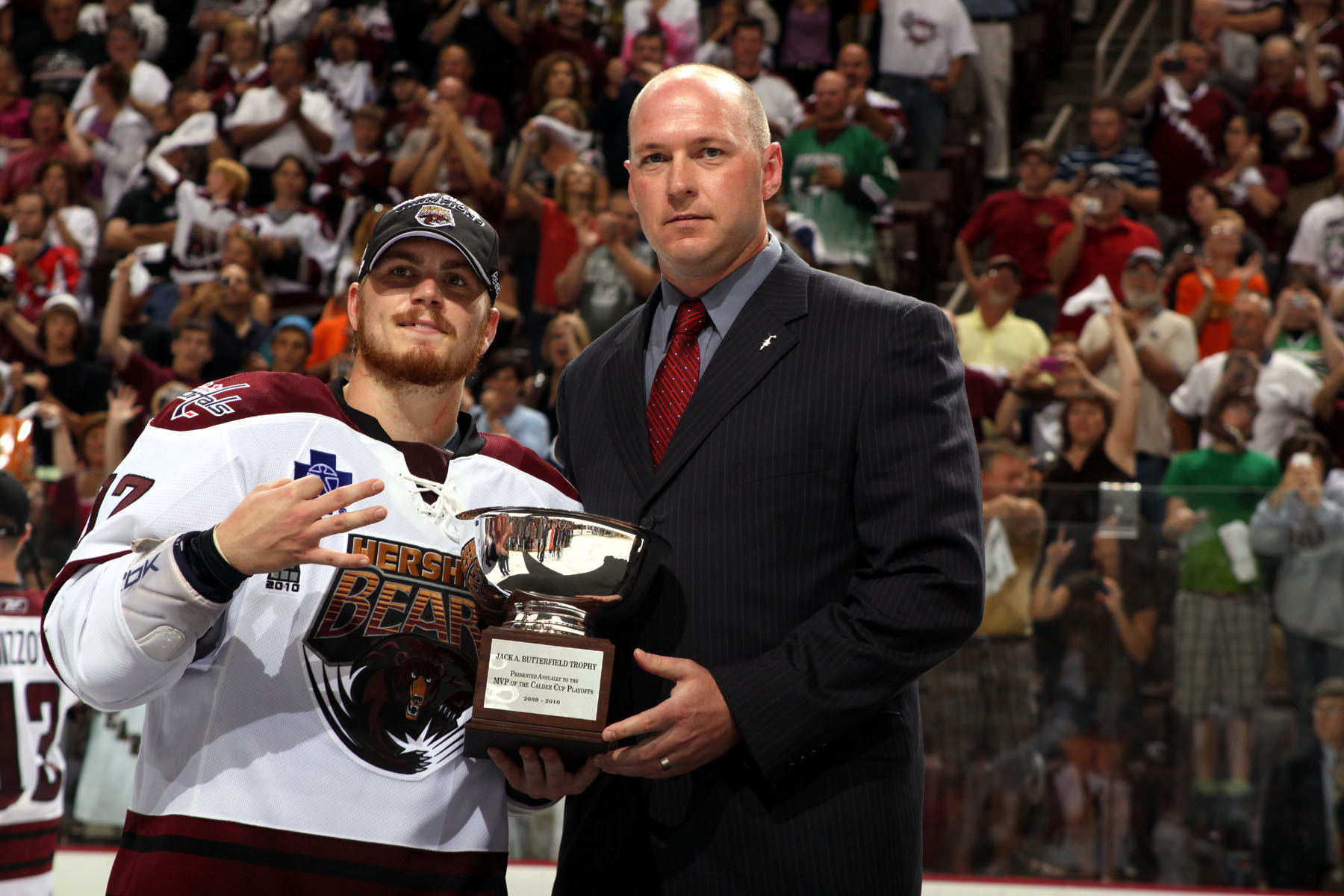
Chris Bourque with the Jack Butterfield Trophy

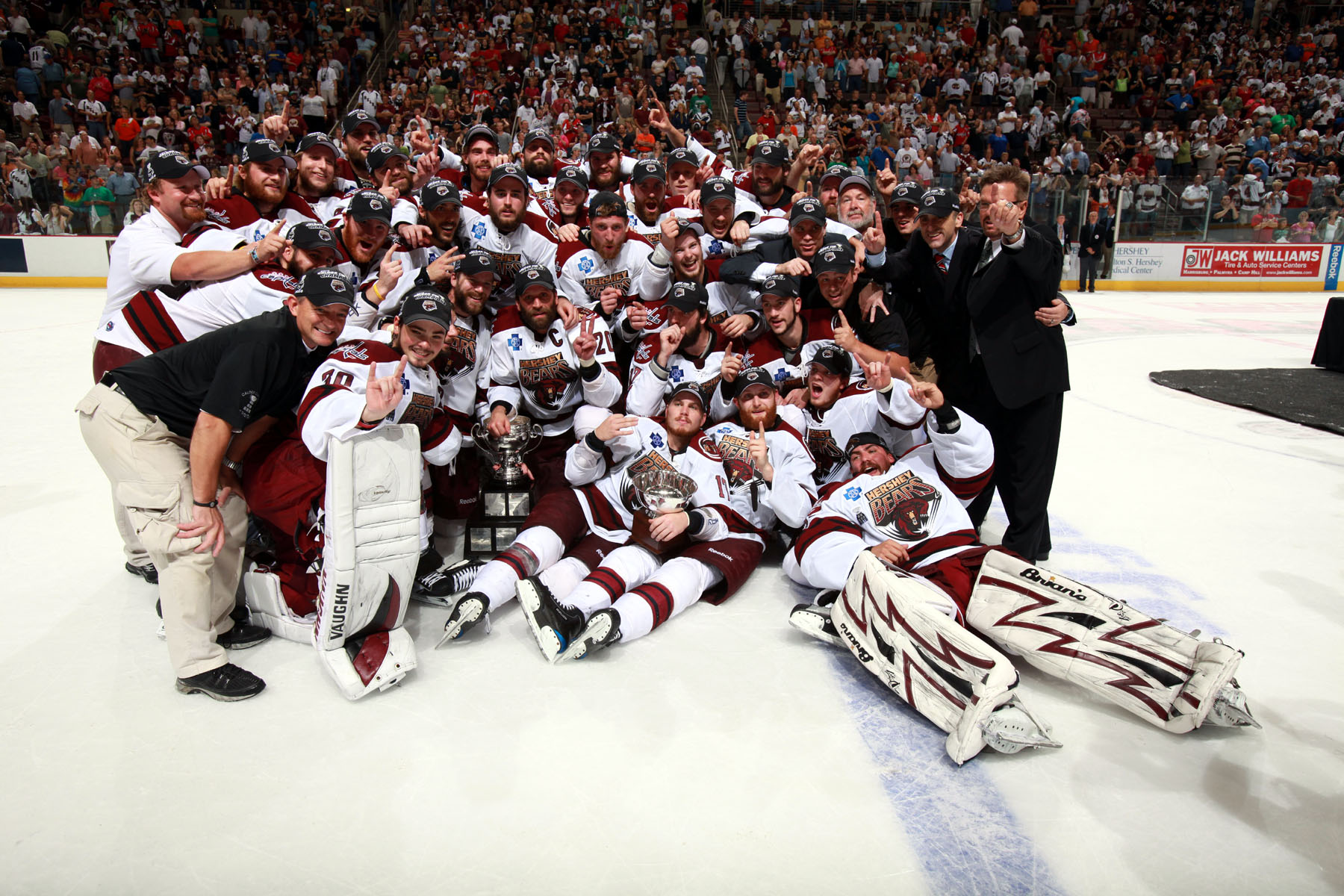
Team shot of the Hershey Bears

== Playoff seeds ==
After the 2009–10 AHL regular season, 16 teams qualified for the playoffs. The top eight teams from each conference qualified for the playoffs.

=== Eastern Conference ===
==== Atlantic Division ====
1. Worcester Sharks – 104 points
2. Portland Pirates – 101 points
3. Manchester Monarchs – 95 points
4. Lowell Devils – 88 points
5. Bridgeport Sound Tigers – 86 points

==== East Division ====
1. Hershey Bears – 123 points
2. Albany River Rats – 94 points
3. Wilkes-Barre/Scranton Penguins – 87 points

=== Western Conference ===
==== North Division ====
1. Hamilton Bulldogs – 115 points
2. Rochester Americans – 91 points
3. Abbotsford Heat – 90 points
4. Manitoba Moose – 87 points

==== West Division ====
1. Chicago Wolves – 105 points
2. Texas Stars – 99 points
3. Rockford IceHogs – 94 points
4. Milwaukee Admirals – 91 points

== Bracket ==
Division Semifinals	Division Finals
E1	Hershey	4
A5	Bridgeport	1
E1	Hershey	4
East Division
E2	Albany	0
E2	Albany	4
E3	Wilkes-Barre/Scranton	0
Eastern Conference
A1	Worcester	4
A4	Lowell	1
A1	Worcester	2
Atlantic Division
A3	Manchester	4
A2	Portland	0
A3	Manchester	4
N1	Hamilton	4
N4	Manitoba	2
N1	Hamilton	4
North Division
N3	Abbotsford	2
N2	Rochester	3
N3	Abbotsford	4
Western Conference
W1	Chicago	4
W4	Milwaukee	3
W1	Chicago	3
West Division
W2	Texas	4
W2	Texas	4
W3	Rockford	0

Conference Finals
E1	Hershey	4
A3	Manchester	2
N1	Hamilton	3
W2	Texas	4

Calder Cup Final
E1	Hershey	4
W2	Texas	2

In each round the team that earned more points during the regular season receives home ice advantage, meaning they receive the "extra" game on home-ice if the series reaches the maximum number of games. There is no set series format due to arena scheduling conflicts and travel considerations.

== Playoff statistical leaders ==
=== Leading skaters ===
These are the top ten skaters based on points. If there is a tie in points, goals take precedence over assists.

GP = Games played; G = Goals; A = Assists; Pts = Points; +/– = Plus–minus; PIM = Penalty minutes

Player	Team	GP	G	A	Pts	+/–	PIM
Alexandre Giroux	Hershey Bears	21	14	13	27	+2	22
Chris Bourque	Hershey Bears	21	7	20	27	+7	10
Jamie Benn	Texas Stars	24	14	12	26	+7	22
Keith Aucoin	Hershey Bears	21	2	23	25	+1	2
David Desharnais	Hamilton Bulldogs	19	10	13	23	+4	16
Andrew Gordon	Hershey Bears	17	13	7	20	+2	2
Brock Trotter	Hamilton Bulldogs	19	8	11	19	+5	14
Mathieu Perreault	Hershey Bears	21	7	12	19	+14	18
Perttu Lindgren	Texas Stars	24	7	10	17	+1	2
Andrew Hutchinson	Texas Stars	21	5	11	16	+9	14

=== Leading goaltenders ===
This is a combined table of the top five goaltenders based on games played who have played at least 420 minutes. The table is initially sorted by goals against average, with the criterion for inclusion in bold.

GP = Games played; W = Wins; L = Losses; SA = Shots against; GA = Goals against; GAA = Goals against average; SV% = Save percentage; SO = Shutouts; TOI = Time on ice (in minutes)

Player	Team	GP	W	L	SA	GA	GAA	SV%	SO	TOI
Michal Neuvirth	Hershey Bears	18	14	4	489	39	**2.07**	**.920**	1	1133
Jonathan Bernier	Manchester Monarchs	16	10	6	488	30	**1.81**	**.939**	3	996
Matt Climie	Texas Stars	15	7	6	476	40	**2.71**	**.916**	0	885
Alex Stalock	Worcester Sharks	11	6	5	320	26	**2.28**	**.919**	0	683
Brent Krahn	Texas Stars	11	7	4	342	26	**2.48**	**.924**	0	628

== Division Semifinals ==
Note 1: All times are in Eastern Time (UTC-4).
Note 2: Game times in italics signify games to be played only if necessary.
Note 3: Home team is listed first.

=== Eastern Conference ===
==== East Division ====
===== (E1) Hershey Bears vs. (A5) Bridgeport Sound Tigers =====
April 14	Hershey Bears	4 – 3	OT	Bridgeport Sound Tigers	Giant Center	Recap
No scoring		First period		5:40 - Trevor Smith (1); 15:14 - Matt Martin (1)
Alexandre Giroux (1) - 5:33		Second period		19:59 - Andrew MacDonald (1)
Francois Bouchard (1) - 14:14; Mathieu Perreault (1) - 18:52		Third period		No scoring
Andrew Joudrey (1) - 4:08		First overtime period
Braden Holtby (21 saves / 24 shots)		Goalie stats		Scott Munroe (29 saves / 33 shots)

April 16	Hershey Bears	3 – 2	Bridgeport Sound Tigers	Giant Center	Recap
No scoring		First period	16:14 - Dustin Kohn (1)
Alexandre Giroux (2) - 16:32		Second period	19:15 - pp - Dustin Kohn (2)
Alexandre Giroux (3) - 1:32; Mathieu Perreault (2) - pp - 7:06		Third period	No scoring
Michal Neuvirth (23 saves / 25 shots)		Goalie stats	Nathan Lawson (30 saves / 32 shots); Scott Munroe (8 saves / 9 shots)

April 17	Bridgeport Sound Tigers	2 – 7	Hershey Bears	Arena at Harbor Yard	Recap
No scoring		First period	No scoring
No scoring		Second period	5:19 - Andrew Gordon (1); 5:44 - Andrew Gordon (2); 10:34 - Alexandre Giroux (4); 11:52 - pp - Andrew Gordon (3); 12:46 - Steve Pinizzotto (1); 18:12 - pp - Alexandre Giroux (5)
Greg Mauldin (1) - 9:11; Jeremy Reich (1) - 17:56		Third period	Kyle Wilson (1) - 17:06
Scott Munroe (10 saves / 15 shots); Mikko Koskinen (7 saves / 9 shots)		Goalie stats	Michal Neuvirth (32 saves / 34 shots)

April 18	Bridgeport Sound Tigers	4 – 1	Hershey Bears	Arena at Harbor Yard	Recap
Sean Bentivoglio (1) - pp - 15:07		First period	No scoring
Andrew MacDonald (2) - pp - 0:34; Andrew MacDonald (3) - pp - 12:03; Robin Figren (1) - 18:31		Second period	No scoring
No scoring		Third period	6:55 - Andrew Gordon (4)
Mikko Koskinen 26 saves / 27 shots		Goalie stats	Braden Holtby (24 saves / 28 shots)

April 21	Hershey Bears	4 – 1	Bridgeport Sound Tigers	Giant Center	Recap
Karl Alzner (1) - 3:25; Zach Miskovic (1) - 9:29; Kyle Wilson (2) - 14:51		First period	12:42 - sh - Dylan Reese (1)
Alexandre Giroux (6) - pp - 1:32		Second period	No scoring
No scoring		Third period	No scoring
Michal Neuvirth (6 saves / 7 shots)		Goalie stats	Mikko Koskinen (30 saves / 34 shots)

Hershey won series 4–1

===== (E2) Albany River Rats vs. (E3) Wilkes-Barre/Scranton Penguins =====
April 14	Albany River Rats	4 – 3	Wilkes-Barre/Scranton Penguins	Times Union Center	Recap
Jacob Micflikier 1 - 10:01		First period	12:26 - sh - Nick Johnson 1
Nick Dodge 1 - 9:55; Jamie McBain 1 - 10:31		Second period	No scoring
Nick Dodge 2 - 19:09		Third period	2:52 - Nick Johnson 2; 18:38 - Nick Johnson 3
Justin Peters 30 saves / 33 shots		Goalie stats	Brad Thiessen 34 saves / 38 shots

April 16	Albany River Rats	3 – 2	Wilkes-Barre/Scranton Penguins	Times Union Center	Recap
No scoring		First period	15:12 - Eric Tangradi 1
Chris Terry 1 - 7:17		Second period	No scoring
Nick Dodge 3 - 10:00; Jamie McBain 2 - 15:58		Third period	14:50 - Konstantin Pushkarev 1
Justin Peters 27 saves / 29 shots		Goalie stats	John Curry 29 saves / 32 shots

April 18	Wilkes-Barre/Scranton Penguins	1 – 2	Albany River Rats	Mohegan Sun Arena at Casey Plaza	Recap
No scoring		First period	No scoring
No scoring		Second period	No scoring
Chris Conner 1 - 14:27		Third period	2:16 - Mike Angelidis 1; 5:45 - Jerome Samson 2
John Curry 26 saves / 28 shots		Goalie stats	Justin Peters 31 saves / 32 shots

April 19	Wilkes-Barre/Scranton Penguins	3 – 5	Albany River Rats	Mohegan Sun Arena at Casey Plaza	Recap
Wyatt Smith 1 - 15:33		First period	No scoring
pp - Chris Conner 2 - 18:50		Second period	12:32 - Oskar Osala 1; 19:36 - Jamie McBain 3
Nick Johnson 4 - 0:28		Third period	1:49 - Jerome Samson 3; 13:12 - Zach Boychuk 1; 19:55 - en - Jamie McBain 4
John Curry 34 saves / 38 shots		Goalie stats	Justin Peters 26 saves / 29 shots

Albany won series 4–0

==== Atlantic Division ====
===== (A1) Worcester Sharks vs. (A4) Lowell Devils =====
April 14	Worcester Sharks	2 – 3	Lowell Devils	DCU Center	Recap
No scoring		First period	15:16 - Brad Mills 1
pp Dan DaSilva 1 - 8:36; John McCarthy 1 - 14:53		Second period	10:10 - pp Ben Walter 1; 18:33 - Alexander Vasyunov 1
No scoring		Third period	No scoring
Alex Stalock 21 saves / 24 shots		Goalie stats	Mike McKenna 34 saves / 36 shots

April 15	Worcester Sharks	3 – 2	OT	Lowell Devils	DCU Center	Recap
Derek Joslin 1 - 7:36; Danny Groulx 1 - 13:48		First period		No scoring
No scoring		Second period		No scoring
No scoring		Third period		15:29 - Tyler Eckford 1; 15:38 - Patrick Davis 1
Ryan Vesce 1 - 19:03		First overtime period
Alex Stalock 34 saves / 36 shots		Goalie stats		Mike McKenna 32 saves / 35 shots

April 17	Lowell Devils	2 – 3	Worcester Sharks	Tsongas Center at UMass Lowell	Recap
No scoring		First period	5:24 - Dan DaSilva 2; 16:05 - pp - T. J. Trevelyan 1
pp - David McIntyre 1 - 17:52		Second period	19:19 - Derek Joslin 2
pp - Matt Taormina 1 - 14:07		Third period	No scoring
Mike McKenna 28 saves / 31 shots		Goalie stats	Alex Stalock 32 saves / 34 shots

April 20	Lowell Devils	2 – 4	Worcester Sharks	Tsongas Center at UMass Lowell	Recap
Alexander Vasyunov 2 - 1:55		First period	9:18 - Andrew Desjardins 1
Patrick Davis 2 - 3:36		Second period	No scoring
No scoring		Third period	4:28 - John McCarthy 2; 10:27 - pp - Benn Ferriero 1; 13:16 - pp - T. J. Trevelyan 2
Mike McKenna 37 saves / 41 shots		Goalie stats	Alex Stalock 25 saves / 27 shots

April 21	Lowell Devils	1 – 5	Worcester Sharks	Tsongas Center at UMass Lowell	Recap
No scoring		First period	10:24 - T. J. Trevelyan 3; 13:02 - Benn Ferriero 2
Nick Palmieri 1 - 2:26		Second period	9:44 - sh - Benn Ferriero 2; 19:00 - pp - Andrew Desjardins 2
No scoring		Third period	4:21 - T. J. Trevelyan 4
Mike McKenna 25 saves / 30 shots		Goalie stats	Alex Stalock 33 saves / 34 shots

Worcester won series 4–1

Due to scheduling issues Lowell hosted game 5.

===== (A2) Portland Pirates vs. (A3) Manchester Monarchs =====
April 16	Portland Pirates	1 – 2	Manchester Monarchs (AHL)	Cumberland County Civic Center	Recap
pp - Derek Whitmore 1 - 6:18		First period	No scoring
No scoring		Second period	No scoring
No scoring		Third period	2:22 - John Zeiler 1; 4:37 - pp - Bud Holloway 1
J. P. Lamoureux 28 saves / 30 shots		Goalie stats	Jonathan Bernier 22 saves / 23 shots

April 17	Portland Pirates	1 – 3	Manchester Monarchs (AHL)	Cumberland County Civic Center	Recap
No scoring		First period	11:26 - Corey Elkins 1; 13:11 - Bud Holloway 2; 17:00 - Trevor Lewis 1
pp - Derek Whitmore 2 - 9:33		Second period	No scoring
No scoring		Third period	No scoring
J. P. Lamoureux 34 saves / 37 shots		Goalie stats	Jonathan Bernier 22 saves / 23 shots

April 19	Manchester Monarchs (AHL)	2 – 1	OT	Portland Pirates	Verizon Wireless Arena	Recap
Marc-Andre Cliche 1 - 0:35		First period		No scoring
No scoring		Second period		7:43 - Mike Weber 1
No scoring		Third period		No scoring
Bud Holloway 2 - 2:00		First overtime period
Jonathan Bernier 37 saves / 38 shots		Goalie stats		J. P. Lamoureux 23 saves / 25 shots

April 20	Manchester Monarchs (AHL)	7 – 2	Portland Pirates	Verizon Wireless Arena	Recap
No scoring		First period	No scoring
Trevor Lewis 2 - 0:31; Trevor Lewis 3 - pp - 12:10; Bud Holloway 4 - 12:52; Kevin Westgarth 1 - 15:39		Second period	18:47 - pp Nathan Gerbe 1
Oscar Moller 1 - 16:52; Andrew Campbell 1 - en - 17:04; Joe Piskula 1 - 18:53		Third period	12:10 - Mark Mancari 1
Jonathan Bernier 44 saves / 46 shots		Goalie stats	Todd Ford 17 saves / 20 shots J. P. Lamoureux 5 saves / 8 shots

Manchester won series 4–0

=== Western Conference ===
==== North Division ====
===== (N1) Hamilton Bulldogs vs. (N4) Manitoba Moose =====
April 15	Hamilton Bulldogs	2 – 0	Manitoba Moose	Copps Coliseum	Recap
Mike Glumac 1 - 5:54		First period	No scoring
No scoring		Second period	No scoring
Ryan Russell 1 - 3:37		Third period	No scoring
Cedrick Desjardins 21 saves / 21 shots		Goalie stats	Cory Schneider 16 saves / 18 shots

April 17	Hamilton Bulldogs	8 – 2	Manitoba Moose	Copps Coliseum	Recap
David Desharnais 1 - pp - 6:32		First period	19:10 - Mario Bliznak 1
Ryan Russell 2 - 2:24; P. K. Subban 1 - pp - 8:50; Mike Glumac 2 - pp - 10:57; Brock Trotter 1 - 12:19; Brock Trotter 2 - 19:53		Second period	No scoring
J. T. Wyman 1 - sh, ps - 2:42; Alex Henry 1 - pp - 13:44		Third period	0:38 - pp - Dan Sexton 1
Cedrick Desjardins 28 saves / 30 shots		Goalie stats	Cory Schneider 17 saves / 22 shots Daren Machesney 12 saves / 15 shots

April 19	Manitoba Moose	7 – 2	Hamilton Bulldogs	MTS Centre	Recap
Jordan Schroeder 1 - pp - 12:04; Jordan Schroeder 2 - pp - 14:28		First period	No scoring
Dan Sexton 2 - 2:02; Jordan Schroeder 3 - 2:43		Second period	2:59 - Andrew Conboy 1; 8:51 - pp - Ryan White 1
Guillaume Desbiens 1 - sh - 3:58; Yan Stastny 1 - pp - 14:51; Marco Rosa 1 - pp - 16:38		Third period	No scoring
Cory Schneider 34 saves / 36 shots		Goalie stats	Cedrick Desjardins 4 saves / 8 shots Robert Mayer 13 saves / 16 shots

April 21	Manitoba Moose	4 – 5	2OT	Hamilton Bulldogs	MTS Centre	Recap
No scoring		First period		12:37 - pp - Mike Glumac 3
Evan Oberg 1 - 1:20; Mario Bliznak 2 - pp - 6:31; Dusty Collins 1 - 7:11; Kevin Clark 1 - 8:41		Second period		6:46 - Brock Trotter 3; 10:48 - P. K. Subban 2
No scoring		Third period		12:19 - Mike Glumac 4
No scoring		Second overtime period		6:05 - P. K. Subban 3
Cory Schneider 40 saves / 45 shots		Goalie stats		Cedrick Desjardins 38 saves / 42 shots

April 23	Manitoba Moose	5 – 2	Hamilton Bulldogs	MTS Centre	Recap
Peter Olvecky 1 - pp - 10:58		First period	No scoring
Peter Olvecky 2 - 19:17		Second period	No scoring
Aaron Volpatti 1 - 0:32; Guillaume Desbiens 2 - 14:19; Guillaume Desbiens 3 - en - 18:54		Third period	4:45 - Andre Benoit 1; 11:08 - pp - David Desharnais 2
Cory Schneider 28 saves / 30 shots		Goalie stats	Cedrick Desjardins 17 saves / 21 shots

April 25	Hamilton Bulldogs	3 – 2	OT	Manitoba Moose	Copps Coliseum	Recap
David Desharnais 3 - pp - 18:04		First period		4:03 - sh - Yan Stastny 2
Ryan White 2 - pp - 15:26		Second period		0:33 - Peter Olvecky 3
No scoring		Third period		No scoring
Grant Stevenson 1 - 8:49		First overtime period		No scoring
Cedrick Desjardins 25 saves / 27 shots		Goalie stats		Cory Schneider 46 saves / 49 shots

Hamilton won series 4–2

===== (N2) Rochester Americans vs. (N3) Abbotsford Heat =====
April 15	Rochester Americans	2 – 3	Abbotsford Heat	Blue Cross Arena	Recap
Jordan Henry 1 - pp - 15:32		First period	0:35 - Keith Seabrook 1; 8:16 - pp - Shawn Weller 1; 18:17 - pp - Keith Seabrook 2
No scoring		Second period	No scoring
Mike York 1 - pp - 19:33		Third period	No scoring
Alexander Salak 6 saves / 9 shots Tyler Plante 20 saves / 20 shots		Goalie stats	David Shantz 30 saves / 32 shots

April 17	Rochester Americans	4 – 1	Abbotsford Heat	Blue Cross Arena	Recap
No scoring		First period	15:43 - John Lammers 1
Jason Garrison 1 - pp - 3:53; Mike Duco 1 - 9:00; Graham Mink 1 - pp - 17:40		Second period	No scoring
Jeff Taffe 1 - 5:23		Third period	No scoring
Tyler Plante 30 saves / 31 shots		Goalie stats	David Shantz 19 saves / 23 shots

April 19	Abbotsford Heat	4 – 8	Rochester Americans	Abbotsford Entertainment & Sports Centre	Recap
Mikael Backlund 1 - pp - 1:44; Jon Rheault 1 - 17:56		First period	18:57 - Clay Wilson 1
No scoring		Second period	8:03 - Shawn Matthias 1; 10:01 - pp - Jordan Henry 2; 13:54 - Clay Wilson 2; 19:52 - Graham Mink 2
Brett Sutter 1 - 3:32; Brett Sutter 2 - pp - 12:23		Third period	6:04 - Shawn Matthias 2; 7:47 - Graham Mink 3; 8:09 - Keaton Ellerby 1
David Shantz 16 saves / 21 shots Leland Irving 4 saves / 7 shots		Goalie stats	Tyler Plante 32 saves / 36 shots

April 21	Abbotsford Heat	1 – 6	Rochester Americans	Abbotsford Entertainment & Sports Centre	Recap
No scoring		First period	8:49 - pp - Jamie Johnson 1
Josh Meyers 1 - 4:14		Second period	7:03 - pp - Jordan Henry 3; 8:21 - Jordan Henry 4; 18:22 - pp - Jason Garrison 2; 18:50 - Michal Repik 1
No scoring		Third period	4:43 - pp - Chris Taylor
David Shantz 16 saves / 22 shots		Goalie stats	Tyler Plante 46 saves / 47 shots

April 23	Rochester Americans	1 – 3	Abbotsford Heat	Blue Cross Arena	Recap
Mike York 2 - 13:04		First period	7:45 - Jon Rheault 2; 10:27 - Garth Murray 1
No scoring		Second period	No scoring
No scoring		Third period	9:48 - David Van der Gulik 1
Tyler Plante 31 saves / 34 shots		Goalie stats	David Shantz 18 saves / 19 shots

April 25	Abbotsford Heat	5 – 1	Rochester Americans	Abbotsford Entertainment & Sports Centre	Recap
Jason Jaffray 1 - 9:09; Jon Rheault 3 - 9:50; Jon Rheault 4 - 11:18		First period	No scoring
David Van der Gulik 2 - pp - 17:51		Second period	8:25 - pp - Jamie Johnson 2
Jon Rheault 5 - 7:26		Third period	No scoring
David Shantz 22 saves / 23 shots		Goalie stats	Tyler Plante 4 saves / 7 shots Alexander Salak 32 saves / 34 shots

April 27	Rochester Americans	0 – 2	Abbotsford Heat	Blue Cross Arena	Recap
No scoring		First period	12:58 - John Lammers 2
No scoring		Second period	6:36 - Olivier Latendresse 1
No scoring		Third period	No scoring
Tyler Plante 38 saves / 40 shots		Goalie stats	David Shantz 24 saves / 24 shots

Abbotsford won series 4–3

==== West Division ====
===== (W1) Chicago Wolves vs. (W4) Milwaukee Admirals =====
April 14	Chicago Wolves	6 – 5	Milwaukee Admirals	Allstate Arena	Recap
Anthony Stewart 1 - pp - 2:07; Joey Crabb 1 - pp - 6:53; Jason Krog 1 - 11:08		First period	16:46 - Mike Santorelli 1; 19:42 - pp - Ryan Maki 1
Arturs Kulda 1 - 11:17		Second period	13:45 - Jonathon Blum 1
Joey Crabb 2 - 1:28; Kevin Doell 1 - 3:42		Third period	14:30 - Mike Santorelli 2; 18:39 - Ben Guite 1
Peter Mannino 23 saves / 28 shots		Goalie stats	Mark Dekanich 29 saves / 35 shots

April 16	Chicago Wolves	3 – 0	Milwaukee Admirals	Allstate Arena	Recap
Spencer Machacek 1 - pp - 18:50		First period	No scoring
No scoring		Second period	No scoring
John Pohl 1 - 8:06; Tim Stapleton 1 - 15:14		Third period	No scoring
Peter Mannino 23 saves / 23 shots		Goalie stats	Mark Dekanich 28 saves / 31 shots

April 17	Milwaukee Admirals	6 – 0	Chicago Wolves	Bradley Center	Recap
Chris Mueller 1 - pp - 16:50		First period	No scoring
Blake Geoffrion 1 - 0:24; Mike Santorelli 3 - pp - 13:21; Alexander Sulzer - pp - 16:25		Second period	No scoring
Blake Geoffrion 2 - pp - 4:15; Andreas Thuresson 1 - 5:58		Third period	No scoring
Mark Dekanich 30 saves / 30 shots		Goalie stats	Peter Mannino 33 saves / 37 shots Drew MacIntyre 8 saves / 10 shots

April 19	Milwaukee Admirals	0 – 1	Chicago Wolves	Bradley Center	Recap
No scoring		First period	No scoring
No scoring		Second period	14:00 - Spencer Machacek 2
No scoring		Third period	No scoring
Mark Dekanich 24 saves / 25 shots		Goalie stats	Peter Mannino 29 saves / 29 shots

April 21	Chicago Wolves	4 – 5	Milwaukee Admirals	Allstate Arena	Recap
Tim Stapleton 2 - 0:53; Kevin Doell 2 - pp - 12:18		First period	No scoring
Joey Crabb 3 - pp - 0:55; Anthony Stewart 2 - pp - 12:43		Second period	5:18 - Andreas Thuresson 2; 17:12 - Mark Santorelli 1; 18:10 - Ben Guite 2
No scoring		Third period	10:53 - Ryan Thang 1; 18:05 - pp - Chris Mueller 2
Peter Mannino 27 saves / 32 shots		Goalie stats	Mark Dekanich 18 saves / 21 shots Chet Pickard 9 saves / 10 shots

April 23	Milwaukee Admirals	5 – 4	OT	Chicago Wolves	Bradley Center	Recap
Ben Guite 3 - 2:46; Marty Murray 1 - 14:09		First period		15:20 - John Pohl 2
Chris Mueller 3 - 1:53; Teemu Laakso 1 - 2:21		Second period		5:42 - Joey Crabb 4
No scoring		Third period		9:51 - pp - Jason Krog 2; 13:00 - pp - John Pohl 3
Ryan Maki 2 - 4:22		First overtime period		No scoring
Mark Dekanich 27 saves / 31 shots		Goalie stats		Peter Mannino 4 saves / 6 shots Drew MacIntyre 11 saves / 14 shots

April 26	Chicago Wolves	2 – 1	Milwaukee Admirals	Allstate Arena	Recap
Anthony Stewart 3 - 12:29; Kevin Doell 3 - 13:57		First period	No scoring
No scoring		Second period	3:01 - pp - Marty Murray 2
No scoring		Third period	No scoring
Peter Mannino 15 saves / 16 shots		Goalie stats	Mark Dekanich 34 saves / 36 shots

Chicago won series 4–3

===== (W2) Texas Stars vs. (W3) Rockford IceHogs =====
April 16	Texas Stars	2 – 1	Rockford IceHogs	Cedar Park Center	Recap
Jamie Benn 1 - 17:41		First period	No scoring
Raymond Sawada 1 - pp - 19:51		Second period	No scoring
No scoring		Third period	7:56 - Rob Klinkhammer
Brent Krahn 27 saves / 28 shots		Goalie stats	Corey Crawford 21 saves / 23 shots

April 17	Texas Stars	3 – 1	Rockford IceHogs	Cedar Park Center	Recap
Maxime Fortunus 1 - 12:52; Perttu Lindgren 1 - 17:12		First period	No scoring
No scoring		Second period	No scoring
Raymond Sawada 2 - 1:06		Third period	14:16 - pp - Kyle Beach 1
Brent Krahn 31 saves / 32 shots		Goalie stats	Corey Crawford 31 saves / 34 shots

April 21	Rockford IceHogs	1 – 6	Texas Stars	Rockford MetroCentre	Recap
No scoring		First period	19:35 - pp - Garrett Stafford 1
No scoring		Second period	1:26 - Jamie Benn 2; 12:14 - Landon Wilson 1; 15:14 - pp - Greg Rallo 1; 19:34 - Jamie Benn 3
Ben Smith 1 - 5:47		Third period	8:23 - Mathieu Beaudoin 1
Corey Crawford 16 saves / 21 shots Hannu Toivonen 4 saves / 5 shots		Goalie stats	Brent Krahn 26 saves / 27 shots

April 23	Rockford IceHogs	2 – 4	Texas Stars	Rockford MetroCentre	Recap
No scoring		First period	3:56 - pp - Andrew Hutchinson 1
No scoring		Second period	8:38 - Mathieu Beaudoin 2; 10:23 pp - Andrew Hutchinson 2
Kyle Beach 2 - pp - 7:51; Kyle Beach 3 - pp - 19:25		Third period	19:51 - en - Warren Peters 1
Corey Crawford 20 saves / 23 shots		Goalie stats	Brent Krahn 38 saves / 40 shots

Texas won series 4–0

== Division Finals ==
=== Eastern Conference ===
==== East Division ====
===== (E1) Hershey Bears vs. (E2) Albany River Rats =====
April 24	Hershey Bears	4 – 3	OT	Albany River Rats	Giant Center	Recap
Andrew Gordon 5 - 4:00		First period		8:25 - Drayson Bowman 1
Andrew Gordon 6 - pp - 15:47		Second period		6:40 - pp - Jerome Samson 3
Keith Aucoin 1 - 13:16		Third period		7:13 - Jerome Samson 4
Kyle Wilson 3 - 10:41		First overtime period
Michal Neuvirth 25 saves / 28 shots		Goalie stats		Justin Peters 44 saves / 48 shots

April 25	Hershey Bears	6 – 3	Albany River Rats	Giant Center	Recap
Ashton Rome 1 - 10:48		First period	15:37 - Drayson Bowman 2
Alexandre Giroux 7 - 5:15		Second period	3:35 - pp - Zac Dalpe 1
Andrew Gordon 7 - pp - 3:24; Alexandre Giroux 8 - pp - 4:10; Andrew Gordon 8 - pp - 9:56; Steve Pinizzotto 2 - en - 18:22		Third period	1:16 - sh - Nick Dodge 4
Michal Neuvirth 18 saves / 21 shots		Goalie stats	Justin Peters 22 saves / 27 shots

April 27	Albany River Rats	5 – 6	OT	Hershey Bears	Times Union Center	Recap
Zac Dalpe 2 - pp - 1:55; Oskar Osala 2 - 4:13		First period		No scoring
Drayson Bowman 3 - 11:22		Second period		5:31 - Ashton Rome 2; 13:58 - pp - Andrew Gordon 9; 15:41 - Chris Bourque 1
Zac Dalpe 3 - pp - 2:22; Mike Angelidis 2 - 6:37		Third period		3:56 - sh - Chris Bourque 2; 16:14 - Alexandre Giroux 9
No scoring		First overtime period		16:08 - Jay Beagle 1
Justin Peters 37 saves / 43 shots		Goalie stats		Braden Holtby 27 saves / 32 shots

April 29	Albany River Rats	4 – 5	OT	Hershey Bears	Times Union Center	Recap
Jerome Samson 5 - 11:58; Chris Terry 2 - pp - 14:28		First period		8:23 - pp - Chris Bourque 3
Zach Boychuk 2 - 10:31		Second period		0:59 - pp - Chris Bourque 4
Jerome Samson 6 - 10:19		Third period		16:37 - pp - Alexandre Giroux 10; 18:47 - Mathieu Perreault 3
No scoring		First overtime period		2:23 - Mathieu Perreault 4
Justin Peters 34 saves / 39 shots		Goalie stats		Michal Neuvirth 17 saves / 21 shots

Hershey won series 4–0

==== Atlantic Division ====
===== (A1) Worcester Sharks vs. (A3) Manchester Monarchs =====
April 25	Worcester Sharks	4 – 3	Manchester Monarchs (AHL)	DCU Center	Recap
No scoring		First period	0:35 - Oscar Moller 2; 9:17 - John Zeiler 2
Benn Ferriero 4 - 14:54		Second period	No scoring
Dean Strong 1 - 2:02; Cory Quirk 1 - 6:29; Steven Zalewski 1 - 11:10		Third period	9:32 - Dwight King 1
Alex Stalock 22 saves / 25 shots		Goalie stats	Jonathan Bernier 23 saves / 27 shots

April 28	Worcester Sharks	2 – 3	OT	Manchester Monarchs (AHL)	DCU Center	Recap
No scoring		First period		No scoring
Brandon Mashinter 1 - 11:22; Derek Joslin 3 - pp - 14:46		Second period		10:15 - pp - Corey Elkins 2
No scoring		Third period		7:37 - Justin Azevedo 1
No scoring		First overtime period		4:29 - Bud Holloway 5
Alex Stalock 28 saves / 31 shots		Goalie stats		Jonathan Bernier 31 saves / 33 shots

April 30	Manchester Monarchs (AHL)	5 – 0	Worcester Sharks	Verizon Wireless Arena	Recap
Gabe Gauthier 1 - pp - 2:24		First period	No scoring
Trevor Lewis 4 - pp - 1:57; Trevor Lewis 5 - pp - 2:47		Second period	No scoring
David Meckler 1 - 6:36; Corey Elkins 3 - 12:06		Third period	No scoring
Jonathan Bernier 26 saves / 26 shots		Goalie stats	Alex Stalock 31 saves / 36 shots

May 1	Manchester Monarchs (AHL)	2 – 3	Worcester Sharks	Verizon Wireless Arena	Recap
No scoring		First period	11:12 - pp - Ryan Vesce 2
Gabe Gauthier 2 - 12:36; Justin Azevedo 2 - 13:39		Second period	No scoring
No scoring		Third period	10:54 - Cory Quirk 2; 19:26 - Derek Joslin 4
Jonathan Bernier 33 saves / 36 shots		Goalie stats	Alex Stalock 19 saves / 21 shots

May 5	Worcester Sharks	0 – 1	Manchester Monarchs (AHL)	DCU Center	Recap
No scoring		First period	13:11 - Bud Holloway 6
No scoring		Second period	No scoring
No scoring		Third period	No scoring
Alex Stalock 24 saves / 25 shots		Goalie stats	Jonathan Bernier 30 saves / 30 shots

May 7	Manchester Monarchs (AHL)	2 – 1	OT	Worcester Sharks	Verizon Wireless Arena	Recap
No scoring		First period		1:45 - Ryan Vesce 3
Gabe Gauthier 3 - pp - 9:06		Second period		No scoring
No scoring		Third period		No scoring
Slava Voynov 1 - 1:55		First overtime period		No scoring
Jonathan Bernier 28 saves / 29 shots		Goalie stats		Alex Stalock 25 saves / 27 shots

Manchester won series 4–2

=== Western Conference ===
==== North Division ====
===== (N1) Hamilton Bulldogs vs. (N3) Abbotsford Heat =====
April 29	Hamilton Bulldogs	2 – 3	Abbotsford Heat	Copps Coliseum	Recap
No scoring		First period	No scoring
Aaron Palushaj 1 - 12:40		Second period	9:40 - David Van der Gulik 3; 13:12 - Gord Baldwin 1
Brock Trotter 4 - 19:14		Third period	1:21 - Brett Sutter 3
Cedrick Desjardins 29 saves / 32 shots		Goalie stats	David Shantz 30 saves / 32 shots

May 2	Hamilton Bulldogs	3 – 1	Abbotsford Heat	Copps Coliseum	Recap
Ryan White 3 - 2:30; Mike Glumac 5 - pp - 8:55		First period	7:20 - pp - Jason Jaffray 2
David Desharnais 4 - pp - 8:23		Second period	No scoring
No scoring		Third period	No scoring
Cedrick Desjardins 22 saves / 23 shots		Goalie stats	David Shantz 20 saves / 23 shots

May 4	Abbotsford Heat	2 – 3	Hamilton Bulldogs	Abbotsford Entertainment & Sports Centre	Recap
Jon Rheault 6 - pp - 5:48; Brett Sutter 4 - pp - 15:15		First period	11:53 - pp - Andre Benoit 2
No scoring		Second period	16:49 - pp - Gabriel Dumont 1
No scoring		Third period	18:54 - Olivier Fortier 1
David Shantz 23 saves / 26 shots		Goalie stats	Cedrick Desjardins 31 saves / 33 shots

May 6	Abbotsford Heat	4 – 1	Hamilton Bulldogs	Abbotsford Entertainment & Sports Centre	Recap
Lance Bouma 1 - 12:44		First period	No scoring
Mitch Wahl 1 - pp - 14:59		Second period	13:18 - Ryan Russell 3
Mitch Wahl 2 - 3:26; David Van der Gulik 4 - 14:35		Third period	No scoring
David Shantz 26 saves / 27 shots		Goalie stats	Cedrick Desjardins 25 saves / 29 shots

May 8	Abbotsford Heat	2 – 5	Hamilton Bulldogs	Abbotsford Entertainment & Sports Centre	Recap
Gaelan Patterson 1 - 11:50		First period	No scoring
Cam Cunning 1 - pp - 1:02		Second period	6:55 - Mike Glumac 6
No scoring		Third period	10:41 - Mike Glumac 7; 16:37 - Andre Benoit 3; 19:27 - en - Ryan Russell 4; 19:59 - en - David Desharnais 5
David Shantz 24 saves / 27 shots		Goalie stats	Curtis Sanford 30 saves / 32 shots

May 10	Hamilton Bulldogs	4 – 0	Abbotsford Heat	Copps Coliseum	Recap
David Desharnais 6 - 18:30		First period	No scoring
No scoring		Second period	No scoring
Aaron Palushaj 2 - 6:14; Brock Trotter 5 - pp - 17:31; Mike Glumac 8 - en - 18:43		Third period	No scoring
Curtis Sanford 30 saves / 30 shots		Goalie stats	David Shantz 33 saves / 36 shots

Hamilton won series 4–2

==== West Division ====
===== (W1) Chicago Wolves vs. (W2) Texas Stars =====
April 30	Chicago Wolves	3 – 4	OT	Texas Stars	Allstate Arena	Recap
Jason Krog 3 - 7:27		First period		6:34 - Colton Sceviour 1
Anthony Stewart 4 - pp - 6:36		Second period		1:43 - Francis Wathier 1
Joey Crabb 5 - 14:25		Third period		0:16 - Jamie Benn 4
No scoring		First overtime period		2:22 - pp - Garrett Stafford 2
Peter Mannino 24 saves / 28 shots		Goalie stats		Brent Krahn 32 saves / 35 shots

May 2	Chicago Wolves	4 – 3	2OT	Texas Stars	Allstate Arena	Recap
Spencer Machacek 3 - 8:36		First period		No scoring
Jason Krog 4 - 3:51		Second period		18:46 - Aaron Gagnon 1
Anthony Stewart 5 - pp - 1:32		Third period		11:57 - Andrew Hutchinson 3; 19:06 - Warren Peters 2
Anthony Stewart 6 - 12:21		Second overtime period		No scoring
Peter Mannino 35 saves / 38 shots		Goalie stats		Brent Krahn 42 saves / 46 shots

May 4	Texas Stars	3 – 5	Chicago Wolves	Cedar Park Center	Recap
Perttu Lindgren 2 - 2:41; Aaron Gagnon 2 - pp - 11:37		First period	5:46 - pp - Spencer Machacek 4; 8:33 - pp - Nathan Oystrick 1
No scoring		Second period	5:11 - Brett Sterling 1; 18:32 - pp - Nathan Oystrick 2
Perttu Lindgren 3 - 14:58		Third period	7:28 - Spencer Machacek 5
Brent Krahn 18 saves / 22 shots Matt Climie 5 saves / 6 shots		Goalie stats	Peter Mannino 27 saves / 30 shots

May 5	Texas Stars	3 – 2	Chicago Wolves	Cedar Park Center	Recap
Travis Morin 1 - 6:23		First period	11:12 - pp - Brett Sterling 2
No scoring		Second period	No scoring
Travis Morin 2 - 6:06; Dan Jancevski 1 - pp - 13:43		Third period	8:37 - Brett Sterling 3
Brent Krahn 21 saves / 23 shots		Goalie stats	Peter Mannino 20 saves / 23 shots

May 7	Texas Stars	5 – 3	Chicago Wolves	Cedar Park Center	Recap
Jamie Benn 5 - pp - 9:40; Jamie Benn 6 - 12:57; Perttu Lindgren 4 - 19:28		First period	2:23 - pp - Anthony Stewart 7
Jamie Benn 7 - 5:43		Second period	11:14 - Anthony Stewart 8
Aaron Gagnon 3 - en - 19:43		Third period	18:29 - Tim Stapleton 3
Brent Krahn 43 saves / 46 shots		Goalie stats	Peter Mannino 12 saves / 16 shots Drew MacIntyre 6 saves / 6 shots

May 9	Chicago Wolves	2 – 0	Texas Stars	Allstate Arena	Recap
Anthony Stewart 9 - pp - 12:28		First period	No scoring
No scoring		Second period	No scoring
Joey Crabb 6 - 6:06		Third period	No scoring
Drew MacIntyre 28 saves / 28 shots		Goalie stats	Brent Krahn 6 saves / 7 shots Matt Climie 26 saves / 27 shots

May 11	Chicago Wolves	5 – 6	OT	Texas Stars	Allstate Arena	Recap
Spencer Machacek 6 - 3:22; Brett Sterling 4 - 4:22; Spencer Machacek 7 - sh - 18:09		First period		4:55 - Travis Morin 3; 5:15 - Scott McCulloch 1
Tim Stapleton 4 - 2:16		Second period		9:10 - Aaron Gagnon 4
Jason Krog 5 - 9:45		Third period		4:09 - Maxime Fortunus 2; 13:50 - Andrew Hutchinson 4
No scoring		First overtime period		4:57 - Jamie Benn 8
Drew MacIntyre 47 saves / 53 shots		Goalie stats		Matt Climie 24 saves / 29 shots

Texas won series 4–3

== Conference Finals ==
=== Eastern Conference ===
==== Hershey Bears vs. Manchester Monarchs ====
May 12	Hershey Bears	4 – 2	Manchester Monarchs (AHL)	Giant Center	Recap
Sean Collins 1 - 0:16; Andrew Gordon 10 - pp - 10:02		First period	No scoring
Steve Pinizzotto 3 - 7:25		Second period	No scoring
Karl Alzner 2 - 14:18		Third period	12:32 - Andrei Loktionov 1; 16:10 - Gabe Gauthier 4
Michal Neuvirth 24 saves / 26 shots		Goalie stats	Jonathan Bernier 24 saves / 28 shots

May 15	Hershey Bears	3 – 2	OT	Manchester Monarchs (AHL)	Giant Center	Recap
Chris Bourque 5 - 3:07		First period		13:58 - pp - Gabe Gauthier 5
No scoring		Second period		1:07 - Gabe Gauthier 6
Steve Pinizzotto 4 - 3:35		Third period		No scoring
Chris Bourque 6 - 10:28		First overtime period		No scoring
Michal Neuvirth 31 saves / 33 shots		Goalie stats		Jonathan Bernier 37 saves / 34 shots

May 17	Manchester Monarchs (AHL)	3 – 2	OT	Hershey Bears	Verizon Wireless Arena	Recap
No scoring		First period		17:26 - pp - Alexandre Giroux 11
No scoring		Second period		No scoring
John Zeiler 3 - 5:44; Gabe Gauthier 7 - 7:22		Third period		3:55 - Mathieu Perreault 5
Justin Azevedo 3 - 2:43		First overtime period		No scoring
Jonathan Bernier 23 saves / 25 shots		Goalie stats		Michal Neuvirth 37 saves / 40 shots

May 18	Manchester Monarchs (AHL)	1 – 0	Hershey Bears	Verizon Wireless Arena	Recap
No scoring		First period	No scoring
Dwight King 2 - 9:11		Second period	No scoring
No scoring		Third period	No scoring
Jonathan Bernier 18 saves / 18 shots		Goalie stats	Michal Neuvirth 25 saves / 26 shots

May 20	Manchester Monarchs (AHL)	2 – 3	OT	Hershey Bears	Verizon Wireless Arena	Recap
No scoring		First period		No scoring
No scoring		Second period		No scoring
Bud Holloway 7 - pp - 4:00; Jake Muzzin 1 - pp - 17:26		Third period		11:41 - Kyle Wilson 4; 19:09 - Chris Bourque 7
No scoring		First overtime period		10:38 - Francois Bouchard 2
Jonathan Bernier 32 saves / 35 shots		Goalie stats		Michal Neuvirth 27 saves / 29 shots

May 22	Hershey Bears	3 – 2	OT	Manchester Monarchs (AHL)	Giant Center	Recap
No scoring		First period		19:43 - John Zeiler 4
No scoring		Second period		17:44 - Joe Piskula 2
Alexandre Giroux 12 - 7:37; Patrick McNeill 1 - 14:09		Third period		No scoring
Boyd Kane 1 - 7:06		First overtime period		No scoring
Michal Neuvirth 32 saves / 34 shots		Goalie stats		Jonathan Bernier 28 saves / 31 shots

Hershey won series 4–2

=== Western Conference ===
==== Hamilton Bulldogs vs. Texas Stars ====
May 14	Hamilton Bulldogs	3 – 2	OT	Texas Stars	Copps Coliseum	Recap
David Desharnais 7 - pp - 5:22; Brock Trotter 6 - 15:23		First period		11:01 - pp - Jamie Benn 9
No scoring		Second period		18:15 - pp - Jamie Benn 10
No scoring		Third period		No scoring
Brock Trotter 7 - pp - 0:14		First overtime period		No scoring
Curtis Sanford 18 saves / 20 shots		Goalie stats		Matt Climie 35 saves / 38 shots

May 16	Hamilton Bulldogs	3 – 1	Texas Stars	Copps Coliseum	Recap
No scoring		First period	No scoring
Ryan Russell 5 - pp - 0:28; Alex Henry 2 - 4:52		Second period	17:40 - Warren Peters 3
Mike Glumac 9 - 10:59		Third period	No scoring
Curtis Sanford 22 saves / 23 shots		Goalie stats	Matt Climie 27 saves / 30 shots

May 19	Texas Stars	5 – 4	OT	Hamilton Bulldogs	Cedar Park Center	Recap
Perttu Lindgren 5 - pp - 10:23		First period		4:44 - Ryan White 4
Jamie Benn 11 - pp - 12:46; Aaron Gagnon 5 - pp - 17:18		Second period		18:20 - Mike Glumac 10
Warren Peters 4 - 15:01		Third period		7:39 - pp - Brock Trotter 8; 18:27 - pp - Ryan Russell 6
Ethan Graham 1 - 2:13		First overtime period		No scoring
Matt Climie 31 saves / 35 shots		Goalie stats		Curtis Sanford 29 saves / 34 shots

May 21	Texas Stars	2 – 1	OT	Hamilton Bulldogs	Cedar Park Center	Recap
No scoring		First period		No scoring
No scoring		Second period		8:56 - pp - David Desharnais 8
Jamie Benn 12 - 0:24		Third period		No scoring
Jamie Benn 13 - 5:52		First overtime period		No scoring
Matt Climie 26 saves / 27 shots		Goalie stats		Curtis Sanford 30 saves / 32 shots

May 22	Texas Stars	0 – 3	Hamilton Bulldogs	Cedar Park Center	Recap
No scoring		First period	13:22 - pp - Ryan Russell 7
No scoring		Second period	3:37 - Mike Glumac 11; 15:33 - David Desharnais 9
No scoring		Third period	No scoring
Matt Climie 30 saves / 33 shots		Goalie stats	Curtis Sanford 23 saves / 23 shots

May 24	Hamilton Bulldogs	2 – 3	OT	Texas Stars	Copps Coliseum	Recap
Gabriel Dumont 2 - 16:58		First period		No scoring
Shawn Belle 1 - pp - 17:51		Second period		9:04 - pp - Garrett Stafford 3
No scoring		Third period		5:56 - Scott McCulloch 2
No scoring		First overtime period		18:32 - Aaron Gagnon 6
Curtis Sanford 35 saves / 38 shots		Goalie stats		Matt Climie 51 saves / 53 shots

May 26	Hamilton Bulldogs	2 – 4	Texas Stars	Copps Coliseum	Recap
David Desharnais 10 - 19:51		First period	No scoring
Max Pacioretty 1 - 5:32		Second period	14:38 - Ethan Graham 2
No scoring		Third period	9:15 - Mathieu Beaudoin 3; 14:00 - Perttu Lindgren 6; 18:33 - Jamie Benn 14
Curtis Sanford 16 saves / 20 shots		Goalie stats	Matt Climie 41 saves / 43 shots

Texas won series 4–3

== Calder Cup Finals ==
=== Hershey Bears vs. Texas Stars ===
The series began eight days after the conclusion of the Conference Finals, as the Giant Center hosted the Ringling Bros. and Barnum & Bailey Circus over the Memorial Day weekend.

June 3	Hershey Bears	1 – 2	Texas Stars	Giant Center	Recap
No scoring		First period	No scoring
Francois Bouchard 3 - 4:25		Second period	9:57 - Greg Rallo 2
No scoring		Third period	2:10 - Scott McCulloch 3
Michal Neuvirth 24 saves / 26 shots		Goalie stats	Matt Climie 26 saves / 27 shots

June 5	Hershey Bears	3 – 4	Texas Stars	Giant Center	Recap
Steve Pinizzotto 5 - sh - 7:40		First period	1:00 - Aaron Gagnon 7
Francois Bouchard 4 - 11:49		Second period	11:03 - pp - Garrett Stafford 4
Andrew Gordon 11 - 10:44		Third period	3:18 - Mathieu Beaudoin 4; 19:14 - Travis Morin 4
Michal Neuvirth 19 saves / 23 shots		Goalie stats	Matt Climie 25 saves / 28 shots

June 7	Texas Stars	3 – 6	Hershey Bears	Cedar Park Center	Recap
Andrew Hutchinson 5 - pp - 5:59; Francis Wathier 2 - sh - 11:15; Raymond Sawada 3 - 17:57		First period	10:33 - Kyle Wilson 5
No scoring		Second period	12:27 - pp - Kyle Wilson 6; 13:55 - Mathieu Perreault 6
No scoring		Third period	6:41 - Andrew Gordon 12; 8:12 - Mathieu Perreault 7; 12:07 - Andrew Gordon 13
Matt Climie 23 saves / 29 shots		Goalie stats	Michal Neuvirth 27 saves / 30 shots

June 9	Texas Stars	2 – 4	Hershey Bears	Cedar Park Center	Recap
Greg Rallo 3 - 17:33		First period	5:17 - pp - Keith Aucoin 2
Perttu Lindgren 7 - pp - 10:47		Second period	13:45 - Jay Beagle 2
No scoring		Third period	17:52 - pp - John Carlson 1; 19:33 - pp/en - Alexandre Giroux 13
Matt Climie 25 saves / 28 shots		Goalie stats	Michal Neuvirth 26 saves / 28 shots

June 11	Texas Stars	1 – 2	OT	Hershey Bears	Cedar Park Center	Recap
Aaron Gagnon 8 - pp - 8:03		First period		No scoring
No scoring		Second period		11:12 - Francois Bouchard 5
No scoring		Third period		No scoring
No scoring		First overtime period		13:28 - Alexandre Giroux 14
Matt Climie 41 saves / 43 shots		Goalie stats		Michal Neuvirth 35 saves / 36 shots

June 14	Hershey Bears	4 – 0	Texas Stars	Giant Center	Recap
John Carlson 2 - pp - 12:29; Karl Alzner 3 - 14:23		First period	No scoring
Patrick McNeill 2 - 14:47		Second period	No scoring
Patrick McNeill 3 - pp - 14:52		Third period	No scoring
Michal Neuvirth 22 saves / 22 shots		Goalie stats	Brent Krahn 32 saves / 36 shots

Hershey won series 4–2

== See also ==
- 2009–10 AHL season
- List of AHL seasons

Preceded by 2009 Calder Cup playoffs	Calder Cup playoffs 2010	Succeeded by 2011 Calder Cup playoffs
