= Ryan Russell =

Ryan Russell may refer to:

- Ryan Russell (American football) (born 1992), American NFL player
- Ryan Russell (ice hockey) (born 1987), Canadian ice hockey player
- Ryan Russell (tennis) (born 1983), Jamaican tennis player
