= Patrick McNeill =

Canadian ice hockey player

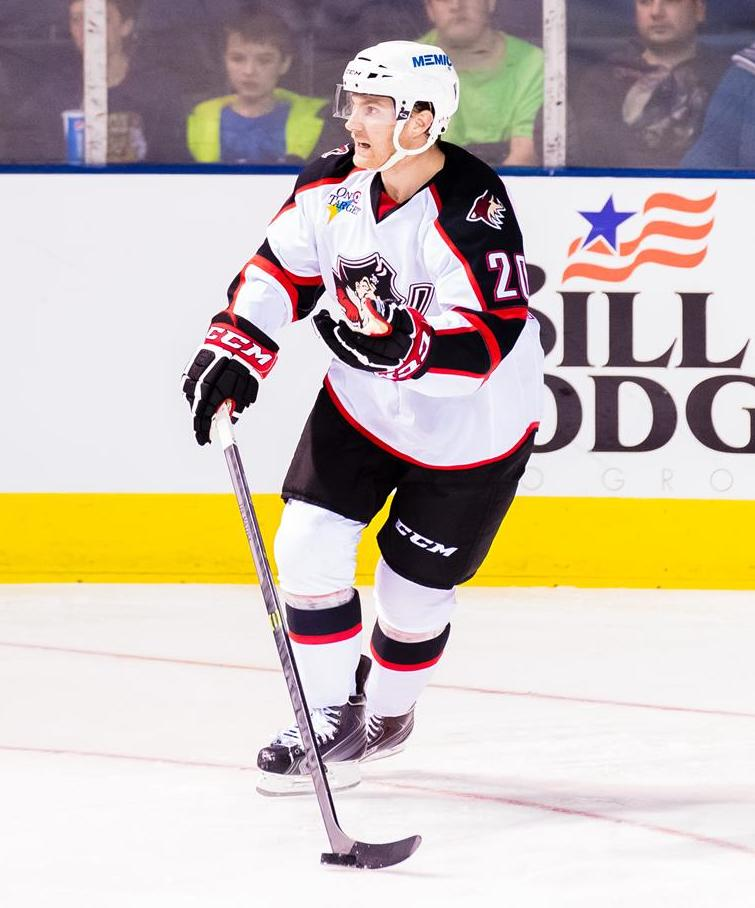
- McNeill with the Portland Pirates in 2014
- Born: March 17, 1987 (age 39) Strathroy, Ontario, Canada
- Height: 6 ft 0 in (183 cm)
- Weight: 201 lb (91 kg; 14 st 5 lb)
- Position: Defence
- Shot: Left
- WOSHL team Former teams: Strathroy Jets; Hershey Bears; Springfield Falcons; Portland Pirates; ERC Ingolstadt; Augsburger Panther
- NHL draft: 118th overall, 2005; Washington Capitals
- Playing career: 2007–2020

Patrick McNeill (born March 17, 1987) is a Canadian former professional ice hockey defenceman who is currently playing men's senior hockey with the Strathroy Jets of the Western Ontario Super Hockey League (WOSHL).

== Playing career ==
Born in Strathroy, Ontario, and a first overall pick in the Ontario Hockey League Priority Selection in 2003 by the Saginaw Spirit, McNeill then earned gold with Team Ontario during the 2004 World U-17 hockey challenge, gold with Team Canada during the 2004 World Junior Cup and a spot on both the 2005 OHL All Star squad and the Team Canada training squad at the 2005 IIHF World U18 Championships.

He was drafted 118th overall in the 2005 NHL entry draft by the Washington Capitals. After signing an entry-level contract with the Capitals, McNeill spent the next six seasons of his professional career with AHL affiliate, the Hershey Bears. He claimed two Calder Cups and ranked 8th in all-time scoring for the Bears amongst defenseman with 152 points.

On July 6, 2013, McNeill left the Capitals organization as a free agent and signed a one-year, two way contract with the Columbus Blue Jackets. In his only year within the Blue Jackets, McNeill was assigned to AHL affiliate, the Springfield Falcons for the duration of the 2013–14 season. He responded with a career-high 11 goals and 37 points in 63 games for the Falcons.

On July 5, 2014, McNeill signed as a free agent to a one-year, two-way contract with the Arizona Coyotes. He was assigned to AHL affiliate, the Portland Pirates for the 2014–15 season.

After his seventh year in the American League, McNeill signed his first contract abroad, agreeing to a one-year deal with German club, ERC Ingolstadt of the DEL on June 1, 2015. In his first DEL season he was best scored defenseman of the league with 39 points.

After three seasons in Ingolstadt, McNeill left as a free agent, opting to continue in the DEL with Augsburger Panther on a one-year deal on June 8, 2018.

Patrick McNeill has played several times for the Canadian national team. He played for Team Canada in Deutschland Cup 2016, he also participated in the scouting tournaments of Team Canada's olympic preparation.

== Career statistics ==
=== Regular season and playoffs ===
			Regular season					Playoffs
Season	Team	League	GP	G	A	Pts	PIM	GP	G	A	Pts	PIM
2002–03	Strathroy Rockets	WOHL	45	6	13	19	53	—	—	—	—	—
2003–04	Saginaw Spirit	OHL	57	3	11	14	28	—	—	—	—	—
2004–05	Saginaw Spirit	OHL	66	7	26	33	31	—	—	—	—	—
2005–06	Saginaw Spirit	OHL	68	21	56	77	64	4	1	3	4	6
2006–07	Saginaw Spirit	OHL	58	22	36	58	49	6	3	2	5	6
2007–08	South Carolina Stingrays	ECHL	19	5	11	16	16	5	0	2	2	4
2007–08	Hershey Bears	AHL	48	1	13	14	16	2	0	0	0	0
2008–09	Hershey Bears	AHL	46	3	15	18	20	10	0	3	3	4
2009–10	Hershey Bears	AHL	62	8	27	35	36	11	3	3	6	2
2010–11	Hershey Bears	AHL	51	7	20	27	30	6	1	2	3	4
2011–12	Hershey Bears	AHL	71	10	31	41	32	2	1	1	2	2
2012–13	Hershey Bears	AHL	47	4	13	17	16	—	—	—	—	—
2013–14	Springfield Falcons	AHL	63	11	26	37	46	5	0	4	4	2
2014–15	Portland Pirates	AHL	23	1	11	12	8	5	1	1	2	0
2015–16	ERC Ingolstadt	DEL	52	6	33	39	42	2	0	1	1	4
2016–17	ERC Ingolstadt	DEL	52	2	26	28	26	2	0	2	2	0
2017–18	ERC Ingolstadt	DEL	37	4	4	8	26	5	0	1	1	2
2018–19	Augsburger Panther	DEL	51	9	20	29	40	13	2	4	6	34
2019–20	Augsburger Panther	DEL	51	3	21	24	34	—	—	—	—	—
2021–22	Strathroy Jets	WOSHL	6	2	2	4	0	2	0	1	1	2
AHL totals			411	45	156	201	204	41	6	14	20	14
DEL totals			243	24	104	128	168	22	2	8	10	40

=== International ===
Year	Team	Event	Result	GP	G	A	Pts	PIM
2004	Canada Ontario	U17	1st place, gold medalist(s)	6	1	4	5	0
2004	Canada	U18	1st place, gold medalist(s)	5	1	1	2	2
Junior totals				11	2	5	7	2

== Awards and honours ==
Award	Year
OHL
Jack Ferguson Award	2003
Second All-Star Team	2006
Third All-Star Team	2007
AHL
Calder Cup (Hershey Bears)	2009, 2010
