= Dan DaSilva =

Canadian ice hockey winger

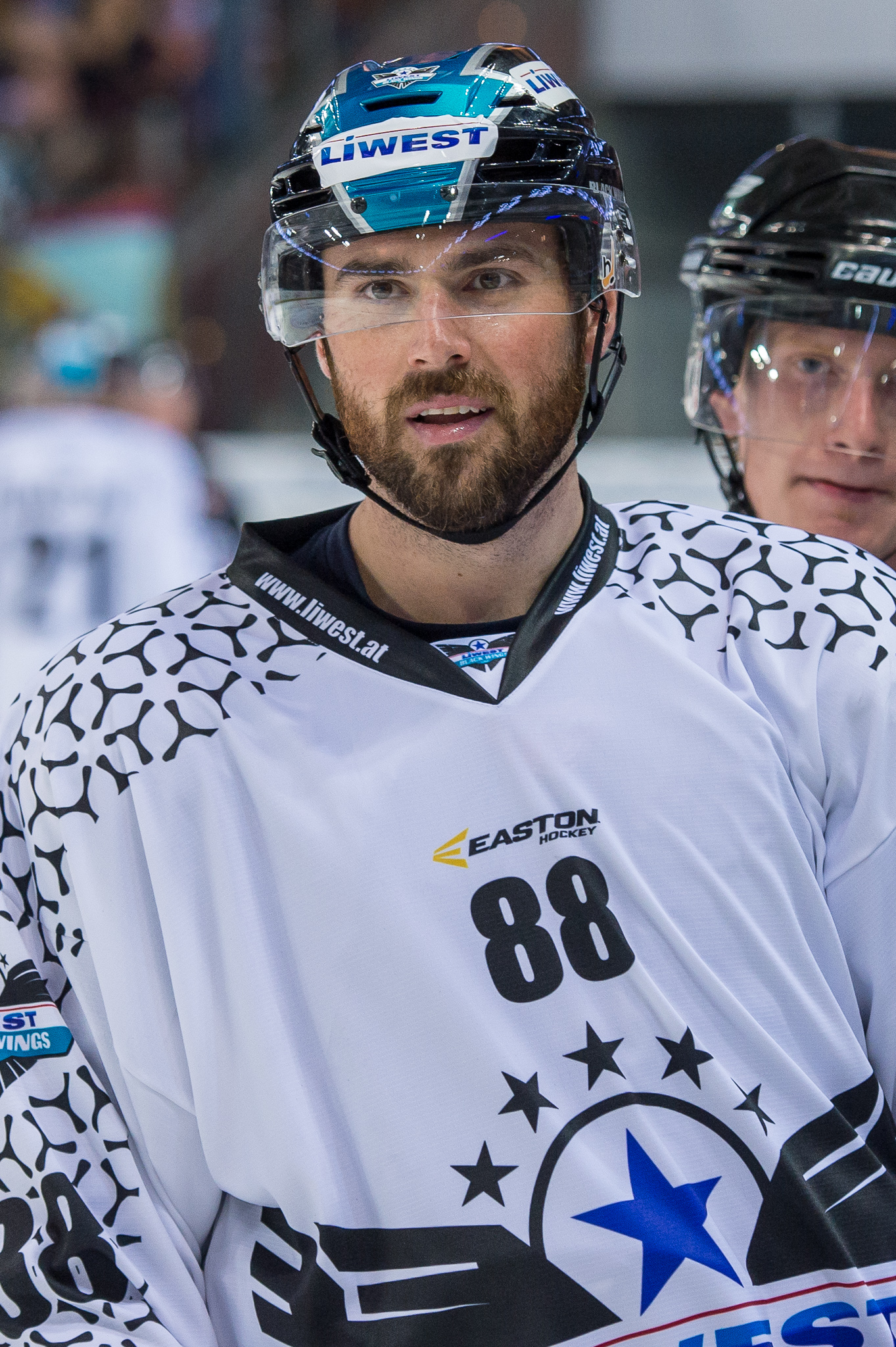
- Born: April 30, 1985 (age 41) Saskatoon, Saskatchewan, Canada
- Height: 6 ft 1 in (185 cm)
- Weight: 195 lb (88 kg; 13 st 13 lb)
- Position: Right wing
- Shot: Right
- Played for: Lowell Lock Monsters; Albany River Rats; Lake Erie Monsters; Worcester Sharks; HC Lev Poprad; Houston Aeros; Augsburger Panther; EHC Black Wings Linz
- NHL draft: Undrafted
- Playing career: 2005–2020

Dan DaSilva (born April 30, 1985) is a Canadian former professional ice hockey winger. As of 2024, he is the head coach of the Saskatoon Blades of the Western Hockey League.

== Career ==
DaSilva played major junior hockey with the Portland Winter Hawks of the Western Hockey League (WHL). In 2005, he was named to the WHL West Second All-Star Team.

On October 11, 2005, DaSilva was signed as a free agent by the Colorado Avalanche who assigned him to play with their American Hockey League (AHL) affiliate, the Lowell Lock Monsters.

After three years playing for Avalanche affiliates, DaSilva signed as a free agent with the Worcester Sharks on October 24, 2008. In the 2008–09 season, he split the year between Worcester and their ECHL affiliate, the Phoenix RoadRunners.

On September 17, 2009, following a training camp with the San Jose Sharks, DaSilva failed to earn a contract but was reassigned to remain with their affiliate, the Worcester Sharks. In 72 games with the Sharks, DaSilva finished third on the team with 21 goals and recorded a career high 53 points. After recording 8 points in 11 post seasons games, DaSilva became Worcester's franchise leader with 18 post season points. DaSilva re-signed with Worcester prior to the on July 27, 2010. After taking part in San Jose's training camp for a second consecutive season, he was again returned to Worcester to begin the 2010–11 season on September 26, 2010.

He signed on to play with HC Lev Poprad for the 2011 season, but his contract was mutually terminated on November 15, 2011. DaSilva signed with HC La Chaux-de-Fonds in December 2011. After scoring 10 points in 8 games, DaSilva was transferred to EHC Olten on January 13, 2012.

DaSilva returned to North America upon completion of the European season and signed as a free agent to a one-year contract with the ECHL's Ontario Reign on September 29, 2012. After posting 42 points in 34 games with the Reign, DaSilva was signed by the Houston Aeros of the AHL on February 23, 2013.

DaSilva made a return to the Worcester Sharks to play his fourth season with the club in 2013–14. After scoring 37 points in 61 games, DaSilva resumed his European career in agreeing to a one-year deal with German club, Augsburger Panther of the Deutsche Eishockey Liga on August 1, 2014. After scoring 36 points in 51 games, DaSilva continued his journeyman career, in signing a one-year contract in the Austrian Hockey League with EHC Black Wings Linz on May 6, 2015. He played the next five seasons with Black Wings Linz before returning to North America and retiring from playing in 2020 during the COVID-19 pandemic.

In 2021, he joined the WHL's Saskatoon Blades as an assistant coach for the 2021–22 season.

== Career statistics ==
| | | | Regular season | | | | | Playoffs |
| Season | Team | League | GP | G | A | Pts | PIM | GP | G | A | Pts | PIM |
|---|---|---|---|---|---|---|---|---|---|---|---|---|
| 2002–03 | Portland Winter Hawks | WHL | 64 | 9 | 13 | 22 | 81 | 7 | 0 | 4 | 4 | 16 |
| 2003–04 | Portland Winter Hawks | WHL | 65 | 36 | 20 | 56 | 120 | 5 | 0 | 1 | 1 | 6 |
| 2004–05 | Portland Winter Hawks | WHL | 71 | 31 | 42 | 73 | 127 | 5 | 1 | 1 | 2 | 6 |
| 2005–06 | Lowell Lock Monsters | AHL | 25 | 3 | 2 | 5 | 27 | — | — | — | — | — |
| 2005–06 | San Diego Gulls | ECHL | 4 | 5 | 3 | 8 | 2 | — | — | — | — | — |
| 2006–07 | Albany River Rats | AHL | 43 | 11 | 8 | 19 | 33 | — | — | — | — | — |
| 2006–07 | Arizona Sundogs | CHL | 14 | 9 | 13 | 22 | 10 | — | — | — | — | — |
| 2007–08 | Lake Erie Monsters | AHL | 54 | 9 | 14 | 23 | 50 | — | — | — | — | — |
| 2008–09 | Worcester Sharks | AHL | 26 | 6 | 7 | 13 | 27 | 12 | 3 | 7 | 10 | 6 |
| 2008–09 | Phoenix RoadRunners | ECHL | 36 | 9 | 12 | 21 | 40 | — | — | — | — | — |
| 2009–10 | Worcester Sharks | AHL | 72 | 21 | 32 | 53 | 65 | 11 | 2 | 6 | 8 | 8 |
| 2010–11 | Worcester Sharks | AHL | 80 | 16 | 25 | 41 | 68 | — | — | — | — | — |
| 2011–12 | Lev Poprad | KHL | 15 | 0 | 1 | 1 | 10 | — | — | — | — | — |
| 2011–12 | HC La Chaux-de-Fonds | NLB | 8 | 6 | 4 | 10 | 6 | — | — | — | — | — |
| 2011–12 | EHC Olten | NLB | 9 | 5 | 5 | 10 | 20 | 4 | 2 | 2 | 4 | 8 |
| 2012–13 | Ontario Reign | ECHL | 34 | 15 | 27 | 42 | 53 | — | — | — | — | — |
| 2012–13 | Houston Aeros | AHL | 22 | 8 | 6 | 14 | 18 | 5 | 0 | 0 | 0 | 2 |
| 2013–14 | Ontario Reign | ECHL | 14 | 7 | 19 | 26 | 20 | — | — | — | — | — |
| 2013–14 | Worcester Sharks | AHL | 61 | 17 | 20 | 37 | 67 | — | — | — | — | — |
| 2014–15 | Augsburger Panther | DEL | 51 | 17 | 19 | 36 | 94 | — | — | — | — | — |
| 2015–16 | EHC Black Wings Linz | EBEL | 39 | 18 | 28 | 46 | 61 | 12 | 5 | 4 | 9 | 14 |
| 2016–17 | EHC Black Wings Linz | EBEL | 53 | 31 | 39 | 70 | 16 | 5 | 1 | 1 | 2 | 4 |
| 2017–18 | EHC Black Wings Linz | EBEL | 50 | 22 | 33 | 55 | 56 | 12 | 8 | 8 | 16 | 6 |
| 2018–19 | EHC Black Wings Linz | EBEL | 52 | 22 | 25 | 47 | 51 | 6 | 4 | 5 | 9 | 2 |
| 2019–20 | EHC Black Wings Linz | EBEL | 43 | 16 | 21 | 37 | 20 | 3 | 1 | 3 | 4 | 2 |
| AHL totals | | | 383 | 91 | 114 | 205 | 355 | 28 | 5 | 13 | 18 | 16 |
| KHL totals | | | 15 | 0 | 1 | 1 | 10 | — | — | — | — | — |

== Awards and honours ==
| Award | Year |
|---|---|
WHL
| West Second All-Star Team | 2005 |
