= Brent Krahn =

Canadian ice hockey player (born 1982)

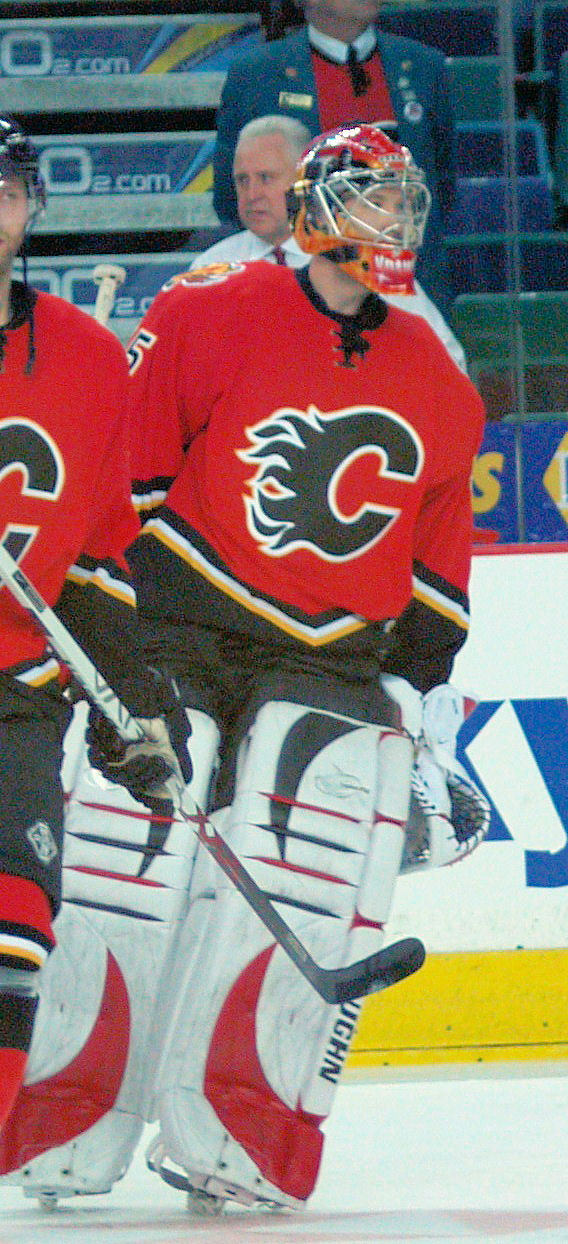
- Born: April 2, 1982 (age 44) Winnipeg, Manitoba, Canada
- Height: 6 ft 5 in (196 cm)
- Weight: 220 lb (100 kg; 15 st 10 lb)
- Position: Goaltender
- Caught: Left
- Played for: Dallas Stars
- NHL draft: 9th overall, 2000; Calgary Flames
- Playing career: 2003–2011

Brent Krahn (born April 2, 1982) is a Canadian former professional ice hockey goaltender. He was drafted ninth overall by the Calgary Flames in the 2000 NHL entry draft and played a single game in the National Hockey League for the Dallas Stars.

== Playing career ==
Brent Krahn enjoyed a very successful junior hockey career with the WHL's Calgary Hitmen before being drafted in the first round by Calgary in the 2000 NHL entry draft. A highly regarded prospect at the time, he was the second goaltender selected in the draft, after Rick DiPietro, who was selected first overall. He subsequently spent time in the American Hockey League with the San Antonio Rampage, Lowell Lock Monsters, Omaha Ak-Sar-Ben Knights, and the Quad City Flames. A recurring knee injury seriously hampered his development at the professional level, and Krahn is now widely regarded as a draft bust.

Following the 2007-2008 NHL season and after 8 years of development in the Flames organization, the team made the decision to not re-sign Krahn, and he became an unrestricted free agent. He was signed by the Dallas Stars on September 24, 2008. Beginning the season with the AHL's Chicago Wolves, Krahn was recalled by the Stars in February 2009, and made his NHL debut on February 14 in relief of starter Marty Turco against the Chicago Blackhawks.

Krahn played for the Texas Stars of the AHL from 2009 until 2011. After the 2010–2011 regular season it was announced that he had been left off the Stars' Clear-Day roster and was therefore ineligible for the AHL playoffs.

He's currently a Sales Representative at Precision Well Servicing in downtown Calgary, a voice on Sportsnet's Calgary Flames home broadcasts, and the host of The Krahnicles podcast.

== Career statistics ==
			Regular season										Playoffs
Season	Team	League	GP	W	L	T	OT	MIN	GA	SO	GAA	SV%	GP	W	L	MIN	GA	SO	GAA	SV%
1997–98	Pembina Valley Hawks	MMHL	21	20	0	1	—	1265	40	3	1.90		2	2	0	120	2	1	1.00
1998–99	Pembina Valley Hawks	MMHL	13	10	3	0	—	770	30	2	2.34		—	—	—	—	—	—	—	—
1999–2000	Calgary Hitmen	WHL	39	33	6	0	—	2315	92	4	2.38	.912	5	2	2	266	13	0	2.93	.893
2000–01	Calgary Hitmen	WHL	37	21	10	3	—	2087	104	1	2.99	.893	—	—	—	—	—	—	—	—
2001–02	Calgary Hitmen	WHL	18	8	6	2	—	1033	61	0	3.54	.891	2	1	1	119	6	0	3.03	.908
2002–03	Calgary Hitmen	WHL	23	11	10	2	—	1343	72	2	3.22	.890	—	—	—	—	—	—	—	—
2002–03	Seattle Thunderbirds	WHL	5	5	0	0	—	302	9	2	1.79	.928	15	9	6	960	38	2	2.38	.919
2003–04	Las Vegas Wranglers	ECHL	14	7	5	2	—	828	36	0	2.61	.925	—	—	—	—	—	—	—	—
2003–04	Lowell Lock Monsters	AHL	7	2	3	0	—	344	15	0	2.62	.924	—	—	—	—	—	—	—	—
2003–04	San Antonio Rampage	AHL	14	3	7	1	—	715	41	0	3.44	.884	—	—	—	—	—	—	—	—
2004–05	Lowell Lock Monsters	AHL	35	20	11	—	2	1998	83	6	2.49	.923	1	0	0	1	0	0	0.00	—
2005–06	Omaha Ak-Sar-Ben Knights	AHL	57	26	20	—	9	3241	135	3	2.50	.912	—	—	—	—	—	—	—	—
2006–07	Omaha Ak-Sar-Ben Knights	AHL	28	14	12	—	0	1564	63	2	2.42	.905	1	0	1	59	3	0	3.06	.875
2007–08	Quad City Flames	AHL	14	6	6	—	2	795	33	0	2.49	.905	—	—	—	—	—	—	—	—
2008–09	Las Vegas Wranglers	ECHL	6	1	4	—	1	342	23	0	4.04	.874	—	—	—	—	—	—	—	—
2008–09	Chicago Wolves	AHL	13	6	6	—	0	738	26	2	2.11	.917	—	—	—	—	—	—	—	—
2008–09	Dallas Stars	NHL	1	0	0	—	0	20	3	0	9.00	.667	—	—	—	—	—	—	—	—
2009–10	Texas Stars	AHL	22	17	4	—	0	1246	38	5	1.83	.945	11	7	4	628	26	0	2.48	.924
2010–11	Texas Stars	AHL	12	6	6	—	0	675	36	1	3.20	.895	—	—	—	—	—	—	—	—
AHL totals			202	100	74	1	13	11,316	470	19	2.49	.915	13	7	5	688	29	0	2.53	.921
NHL totals			1	0	0	—	0	20	3	0	9.00	.667	—	—	—	—	—	—	—	—

== See also ==
- List of players who played only one game in the NHL

Awards and achievements
Preceded by Oleg Saprykin	Calgary Flames' first-round draft pick 2000	Succeeded by Chuck Kobasew
