= Mike Glumac =

Canadian ice hockey player

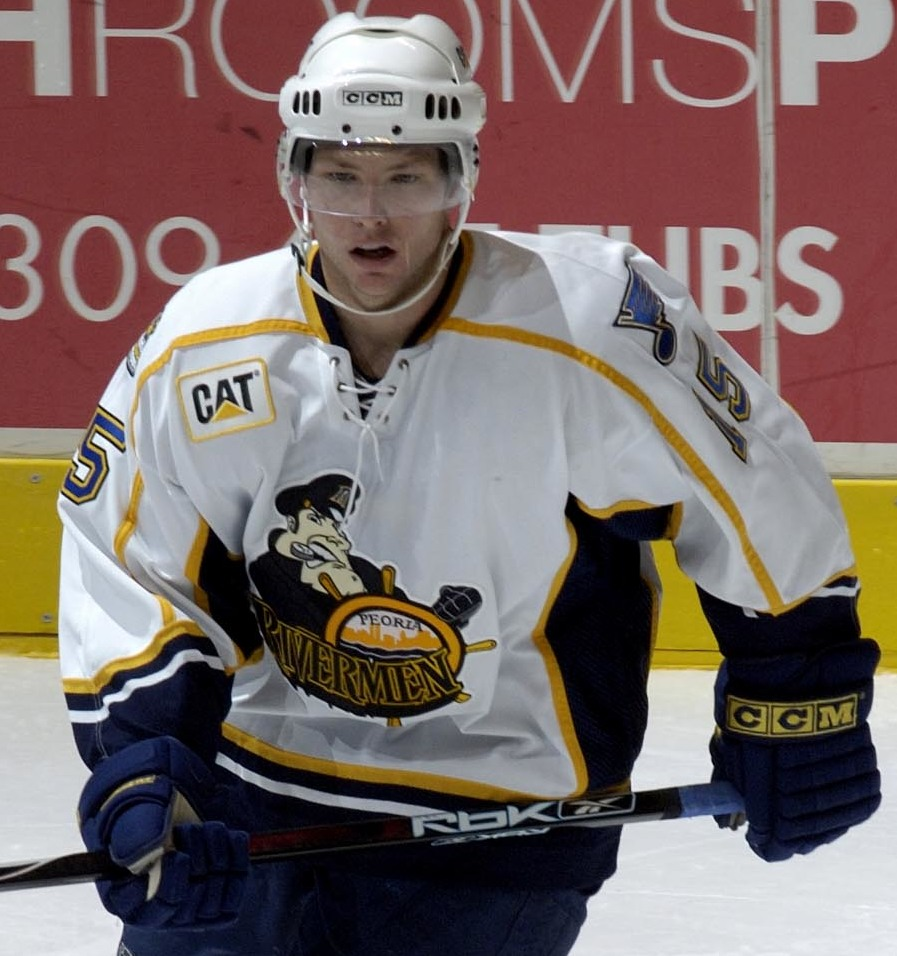
- Glumac with the Peoria Rivermen in 2006
- Born: April 5, 1980 (age 45) Niagara Falls, Ontario, Canada
- Height: 6 ft 2 in (188 cm)
- Weight: 209 lb (95 kg; 14 st 13 lb)
- Position: Right wing
- Shoots: Right
- KHL team Former teams: Medveščak Zagreb; St. Louis Blues; Adler Mannheim
- National team: Croatia
- NHL draft: Undrafted
- Playing career: 2002–present

Michael Glumac (born April 5, 1980) is a retired Canadian professional ice hockey player who last played as Captain for Croatian hockey club KHL Medveščak Zagreb in the Kontinental Hockey League (KHL). He is of Croatian descent.

== Collegiate career ==
Glumac played junior hockey for the St. Michael's Buzzers and Newmarket Hurricanes of the Ontario Junior Hockey League before signing to play US college hockey for Miami University in Oxford, Ohio. Glumac became a fixture for Miami his 4-year collegiate career, voted as team MVP in his senior, 2001–02 season, leading the team in goals (16) scored.

== Playing career ==
Glumac was undrafted out of college, and began his professional career during the 2002–03 season, named to the ECHL All-Rookie Team as a member of the Pee Dee Pride, also winning the ECHL Plus Performer of the Year at +37. He advanced to the American Hockey League (AHL) with the Worcester IceCats the following year, and signed with the parent team, the St. Louis Blues, on June 29, 2004.

After spending the bulk of the next three seasons with the AHL affiliates of the Blues, Worcester and Peoria Rivermen, Glumac made his NHL debut on January 3, 2006 against the Calgary Flames, recording an assist. Glumac would see limited time with St. Louis over the next three seasons, posting 7 goals with the Blues while spending the majority of each season with Peoria.

Glumac signed a contract with the Montreal Canadiens on July 16, 2008 and was sent to affiliate, the Hamilton Bulldogs in the AHL, spending two season with Hamilton.

Glumac had joined the Kassel Huskies of the German Deutsche Eishockey-Liga (DEL) on a try-out in 2010. However, due to Kassel unexpectedly folding, he was released and signed to another try-out with the Straubing Tigers. Unsuccessful with the Tigers, Glumac moved on to his third DEL club, Adler Mannheim, and on October 12, 2010, secured a one-year contract. After leading Mannheim with 17 goals in the 2010–11 season, Glumac was re-signed and would spend three seasons in total with the German club.

On May 24, 2013, Glumac joined newly promoted Croatian club, KHL Medveščak Zagreb of the Kontinental Hockey League on an initial one-year contract, but would spend four seasons in Zagreb. Glumac retired after the 2016–17 season.

== Personal life ==
With a degree in finance from Miami University, Glumac now works for an equipment service firm in Charlotte, North Carolina where he lives with his family.

== Career statistics ==
=== Regular season and playoffs ===
			Regular season					Playoffs
Season	Team	League	GP	G	A	Pts	PIM	GP	G	A	Pts	PIM
1996–97	St. Michael's Buzzers	OPJHL	50	13	25	38	33	6	1	0	1	2
1997–98	Newmarket Hurricanes	OPJHL	36	16	16	32	57	—	—	—	—	—
1998–99	Miami RedHawks	CCHA	35	2	0	2	44	—	—	—	—	—
1999–00	Miami RedHawks	CCHA	36	8	5	13	52	—	—	—	—	—
2000–01	Miami RedHawks	CCHA	37	9	10	19	46	—	—	—	—	—
2001–02	Miami RedHawks	CCHA	36	15	8	23	28	—	—	—	—	—
2002–03	Pee Dee Pride	ECHL	69	37	32	69	49	—	—	—	—	—
2002–03	Cleveland Barons	AHL	2	0	0	0	0	—	—	—	—	—
2003–04	Worcester IceCats	AHL	80	28	24	52	74	10	3	3	6	11
2004–05	Worcester IceCats	AHL	45	12	17	29	27	—	—	—	—	—
2005–06	Peoria Rivermen	AHL	49	25	32	57	64	4	1	1	2	5
2005–06	St. Louis Blues	NHL	33	7	5	12	33	—	—	—	—	—
2006–07	Peoria Rivermen	AHL	72	27	30	57	115	—	—	—	—	—
2006–07	St. Louis Blues	NHL	3	0	1	1	0	—	—	—	—	—
2007–08	St. Louis Blues	NHL	4	0	0	0	5	—	—	—	—	—
2007–08	Peoria Rivermen	AHL	75	21	28	49	99	—	—	—	—	—
2008–09	Hamilton Bulldogs	AHL	66	33	19	52	60	6	1	3	4	4
2009–10	Hamilton Bulldogs	AHL	75	20	20	40	70	19	11	3	14	11
2010–11	Adler Mannheim	DEL	40	17	8	25	44	6	3	1	4	2
2011–12	Adler Mannheim	DEL	52	22	20	42	48	14	2	3	5	6
2012–13	Adler Mannheim	DEL	45	20	11	31	51	6	0	0	0	0
2013–14	KHL Medveščak Zagreb	KHL	41	7	1	8	49	4	0	0	0	2
2014–15	KHL Medveščak Zagreb	KHL	52	5	3	8	72	—	—	—	—	—
2015–16	KHL Medveščak Zagreb	KHL	58	8	3	11	30	—	—	—	—	—
2016–17	KHL Medveščak Zagreb	KHL	60	8	8	16	31	—	—	—	—	—
NHL totals			40	7	6	13	38	—	—	—	—	—

=== International ===
Year	Team	Event	Result	GP	G	A	Pts	PIM
2015	Croatia	WC-D1	16th	5	1	1	2	0
2016	Croatia	WC-D1	26th	5	4	2	6	4
Senior totals				10	5	3	8	4
