= John Lammers (ice hockey) =

Canadian ice hockey player (born 1986)

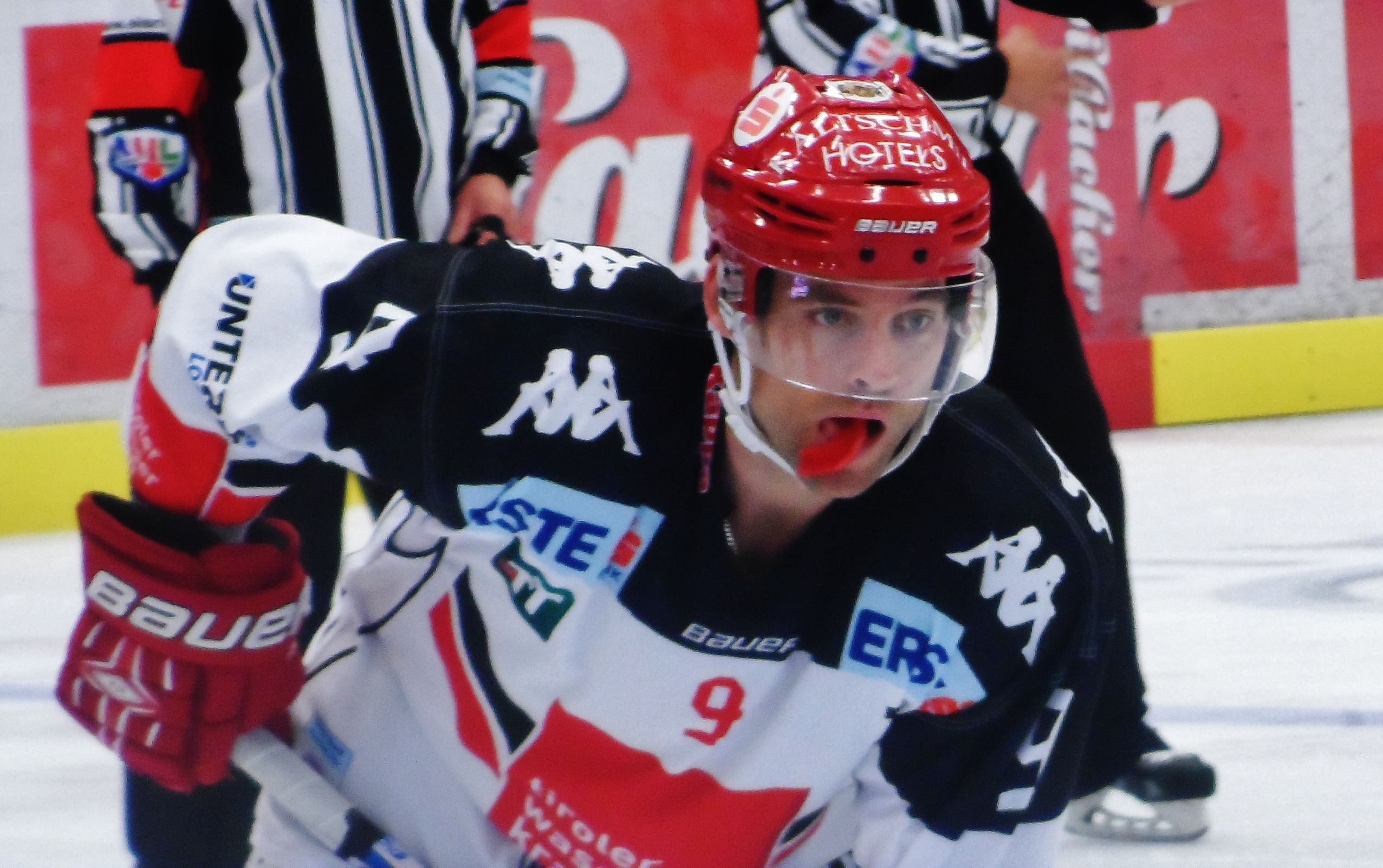
- Born: January 29, 1986 (age 40) Langley, British Columbia, Canada
- Height: 5 ft 10 in (178 cm)
- Weight: 185 lb (84 kg; 13 st 3 lb)
- Position: Forward
- Shoots: Left
- DEL2 team Former teams: ESV Kaufbeuren; Iowa Stars; Ässät; Houston Aeros; Manitoba Moose; Providence Bruins; Abbotsford Heat; HC Plzeň 1929; EC KAC; EC VSV; HC TWK Innsbruck
- NHL draft: 86th overall, 2004; Dallas Stars
- Playing career: 2006–present

John Lammers (born January 29, 1986) is a Canadian professional ice hockey forward who currently plays for ESV Kaufbeuren in the DEL2. He was selected by the Dallas Stars in the 3rd round (86th overall) of the 2004 NHL entry draft.

== Playing career ==
He first joined the EBEL in the 2011–12 season with EC KAC after playing in the Czech Extraliga with HC Plzeň 1929.

After three seasons with Klagenfurt, Lammers opted to join rivals EC VSV on a one-year contract as a free agent on April 8, 2014. In the 2014–15 season with VSV, Lammers contributed with 13 goals and 36 points in 54 games.

On May 4, 2015, Lammers signed to remain in Austria on a one-year contract with his third EBEL club, HC TWK Innsbruck.

== Career statistics ==
=== Regular season and playoffs ===
			Regular season					Playoffs
Season	Team	League	GP	G	A	Pts	PIM	GP	G	A	Pts	PIM
2001–02	Lethbridge Hurricanes	WHL	5	0	0	0	0	—	—	—	—	—
2002–03	Lethbridge Hurricanes	WHL	53	17	15	32	11	—	—	—	—	—
2003–04	Lethbridge Hurricanes	WHL	62	21	24	45	31	—	—	—	—	—
2004–05	Lethbridge Hurricanes	WHL	66	17	30	47	43	5	0	0	0	2
2005–06	Everett Silvertips	WHL	70	38	37	75	25	15	5	6	11	12
2006–07	Iowa Stars	AHL	52	6	8	14	14	—	—	—	—	—
2006–07	Idaho Steelheads	ECHL	9	2	2	4	4	22	7	12	19	2
2007–08	Ässät	SM-liiga	23	0	4	4	24	—	—	—	—	—
2007–08	Iowa Stars	AHL	1	0	0	0	0	—	—	—	—	—
2007–08	Idaho Steelheads	ECHL	36	27	16	43	22	4	0	3	3	2
2008–09	Houston Aeros	AHL	57	12	14	26	40	18	0	8	8	4
2009–10	Alaska Aces	ECHL	25	20	15	35	12	—	—	—	—	—
2009–10	Manitoba Moose	AHL	11	0	0	0	2	—	—	—	—	—
2009–10	Providence Bruins	AHL	31	8	9	17	8	—	—	—	—	—
2009–10	Abbotsford Heat	AHL	4	1	4	5	2	12	2	5	7	2
2010–11	HC Plzeň 1929	ELH	49	10	11	21	22	3	0	0	0	2
2011–12	EC KAC	AUT	43	12	13	25	58	16	2	5	7	10
2012–13	EC KAC	AUT	53	25	32	57	34	15	4	6	10	8
2013–14	EC KAC	AUT	43	14	20	34	4	—	—	—	—	—
2014–15	EC VSV	AUT	54	13	23	36	32	5	0	2	2	14
2015–16	HC TWK Innsbruck	AUT	54	18	31	49	20	—	—	—	—	—
2016–17	HC TWK Innsbruck	AUT	52	22	36	58	22	4	0	0	0	2
2017–18	HC TWK Innsbruck	AUT	54	17	32	49	18	6	1	1	2	6
2018–19	HC TWK Innsbruck	AUT	52	17	30	47	21	—	—	—	—	—
2019–20	HC TWK Innsbruck	AUT	45	14	26	40	18	—	—	—	—	—
2020–21	ESV Kaufbeuren	GER.2	45	25	41	66	12	5	3	3	6	2
2021–22	ESV Kaufbeuren	GER.2	47	22	39	61	12	2	0	2	2	0
AHL totals			156	27	35	62	66	30	2	13	15	6
AUT totals			450	152	243	395	227	46	10	11	21	40

=== International ===
Year	Team	Event	GP	G	A	Pts	PIM
2003	Canada	U18	5	0	0	0	0
2004	Canada	WJC18	7	3	0	3	0
Junior totals			12	3	0	3	0
