= Garrett Stafford =

American ice hockey player (born 1980)

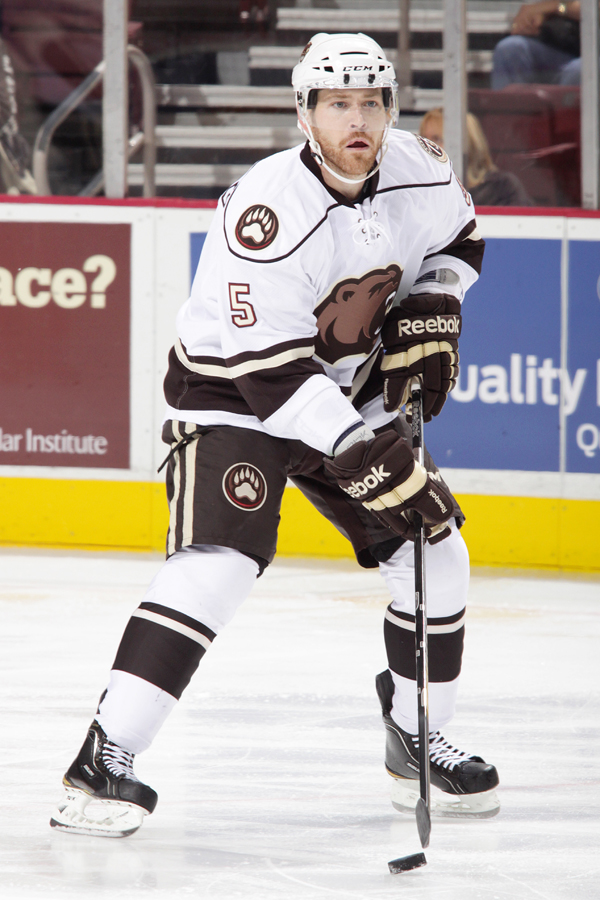
- Stafford with the Hershey Bears in 2012
- Born: January 28, 1980 (age 46) Los Angeles, California, U.S.
- Height: 6 ft 0 in (183 cm)
- Weight: 195 lb (88 kg; 13 st 13 lb)
- Position: Defense
- Shot: Right
- Played for: Detroit Red Wings; Dallas Stars; Phoenix Coyotes; Färjestad BK; Genève-Servette HC; Ässät
- NHL draft: Undrafted
- Playing career: 2003–2015

Garrett Stafford (born January 28, 1980) is an American former professional ice hockey defenseman. He played in the National Hockey League (NHL) with the Detroit Red Wings, Dallas Stars and Phoenix Coyotes.

== Playing career ==
As a youth, Stafford played in the 1993 Quebec International Pee-Wee Hockey Tournament with the California Junior Kings minor ice hockey team.

Stafford played four years of junior hockey for the Des Moines Buccaneers of the United States Hockey League where he led the team to both league and national championships as a captain. Then he earned a full athletic scholarship to the University of New Hampshire. He played for UNH for four years. He was an assistant captain his junior and senior year. During his four years he was voted to one second team Hockey East and one first team all Hockey East. In all the wildcats won the Hockey East Championship twice and made it to the Frozen Four three times. He ended his college career with a national championship game, which UNH lost 5-1 to Minnesota.

On December 9, 2003, he was signed as a free agent by the San Jose Sharks. His rookie season he was voted to All Rookie Team for the AHL and coppered in the All-Star game. He spent three seasons with the Sharks' American Hockey League affiliate, the Cleveland Barons (later the Worcester Sharks.)

His first pro season ended with an ugly incident. On April 30, 2004, Stafford was playing for the Cleveland Barons against the Hamilton Bulldogs in the Calder Cup playoffs when he got into an altercation with Hamilton's winger Alexander Perezhogin. Stafford and Perezhogin were battling resulting in them both falling to the ice. Perezhogin swung his stick into Stafford's face as he was getting up. The slash knocked Stafford unconscious resulting in a concussion and sending him into convulsions on the ice as well as causing severe facial wounds which required 20 stitches to repair.

Perezhogin was charged with assault causing bodily harm and was given a one-year probation as well as being ordered to cover Stafford's medical expenses and donate a further $5000 to charity. Perezhogin was also suspended for the rest of the playoffs and the whole of the 2004–05 season (a total of 89 games), the longest suspension in AHL history, and one of the longest ever in professional hockey. Stafford was also suspended for six games for his part in the incident. He made a full recovery in time for the next season.

On July 16, 2007, he was signed as a free agent by the Detroit Red Wings. Stafford played his first NHL game on February 23, 2008, against the Vancouver Canucks. He was recalled by the Wings earlier that day after injuries to Nicklas Lidstrom, Brian Rafalski and Chris Chelios.

Stafford was released by the Red Wings after the 2008 Stanley Cup run and on July 3, 2008, he was signed as a free agent by the Dallas Stars. On October 4, 2008, the Stars loaned him back to Grand Rapids. The Stars recalled him on March 29, 2009. In the 2009–10 season he was assigned to Dallas' AHL affiliate, the Texas Stars, and helped Texas reach the Calder Cup finals in its inaugural year.

On July 3, 2010, Stafford was signed as a free agent by the Phoenix Coyotes to a one-year contract. Again he competed in the AHL All-Star game and was voted to the starting line up. Later that year, he was again called up by the Coyotes.

On October 23, 2011, the Montreal Canadiens acquired Stafford and forward Petteri Nokelainen from the Phoenix Coyotes in exchange for forward Brock Trotter and a seventh-round pick in the 2012 NHL entry draft.

Stafford was signed as a free agent to a one-year contract with the Washington Capitals on July 2, 2012. Due to the impending 2012 NHL lockout, he was directly assigned to AHL affiliate, the Hershey Bears, to begin the 2012–13 season. On April 2, 2013, Stafford was traded by the Capitals to the Edmonton Oilers in exchange for Dane Byers.

On December 23, 2013, Stafford ended his tenure with Swedish club, Färjestad BK and signed a contract for the remainder of the 2013–14 season with Swiss club, Genève-Servette HC of the National League A. They shortly after competed in the Spengler Cup where he was intricate in helping the Eagles claim the championship through victory over KHL team CSKA Moscow.

In June 2014, Stafford signed a contract for the 2014–15 season with Finnish club, Ässät of the Liiga. In 36 games from the blueline with Ässät, Stafford contributed 2 goals and 12 points.

== Career statistics ==
			Regular season					Playoffs
Season	Team	League	GP	G	A	Pts	PIM	GP	G	A	Pts	PIM
1996–97	Des Moines Buccaneers	USHL	37	1	10	11	40	5	0	0	0	0
1997–98	Des Moines Buccaneers	USHL	53	6	17	23	89	12	1	3	4	42
1998–99	Des Moines Buccaneers	USHL	56	8	33	41	54	13	2	2	4	18
1999–00	University of New Hampshire	HE	38	3	9	12	28	—	—	—	—	—
2000–01	University of New Hampshire	HE	37	5	21	26	44	—	—	—	—	—
2001–02	University of New Hampshire	HE	36	5	22	27	42	—	—	—	—	—
2002–03	University of New Hampshire	HE	23	1	15	16	24	—	—	—	—	—
2003–04	Cleveland Barons	AHL	73	12	34	46	71	6	0	0	0	6
2004–05	Cleveland Barons	AHL	68	6	18	24	55	—	—	—	—	—
2005–06	Cleveland Barons	AHL	80	11	28	39	86	—	—	—	—	—
2006–07	Worcester Sharks	AHL	77	11	30	41	58	6	0	3	3	2
2007–08	Grand Rapids Griffins	AHL	69	11	33	44	36	—	—	—	—	—
2007–08	Detroit Red Wings	NHL	2	0	0	0	0	—	—	—	—	—
2008–09	Grand Rapids Griffins	AHL	70	11	34	45	50	10	0	5	5	4
2008–09	Dallas Stars	NHL	3	0	2	2	0	—	—	—	—	—
2009–10	Texas Stars	AHL	60	7	25	32	22	21	4	6	10	10
2010–11	San Antonio Rampage	AHL	65	14	32	46	74	—	—	—	—	—
2010–11	Phoenix Coyotes	NHL	2	0	0	0	0	—	—	—	—	—
2011–12	Portland Pirates	AHL	6	1	3	4	6	—	—	—	—	—
2011–12	Hamilton Bulldogs	AHL	42	8	16	24	14	—	—	—	—	—
2012–13	Hershey Bears	AHL	48	1	20	21	36	—	—	—	—	—
2012–13	Oklahoma City Barons	AHL	8	0	2	2	0	17	2	2	4	10
2013–14	Färjestad BK	SHL	12	2	1	3	6	—	—	—	—	—
2013–14	Genève-Servette HC	NLA	8	0	1	1	0	1	0	0	0	0
2014–15	Ässät	Liiga	36	2	10	12	75	—	—	—	—	—
AHL totals			665	93	275	368	508	60	6	16	22	26
NHL totals			7	0	2	2	0	—	—	—	—	—

== Awards and honors ==
Award	Year
College
All-Hockey East Second Team	2001–02
Hockey East All-Tournament Team	2002, 2003
AHL
Second All-Star Team	2004
All-Rookie Team	2004
All-Star Game	2011
