= Jérôme Samson =

Canadian ice hockey player

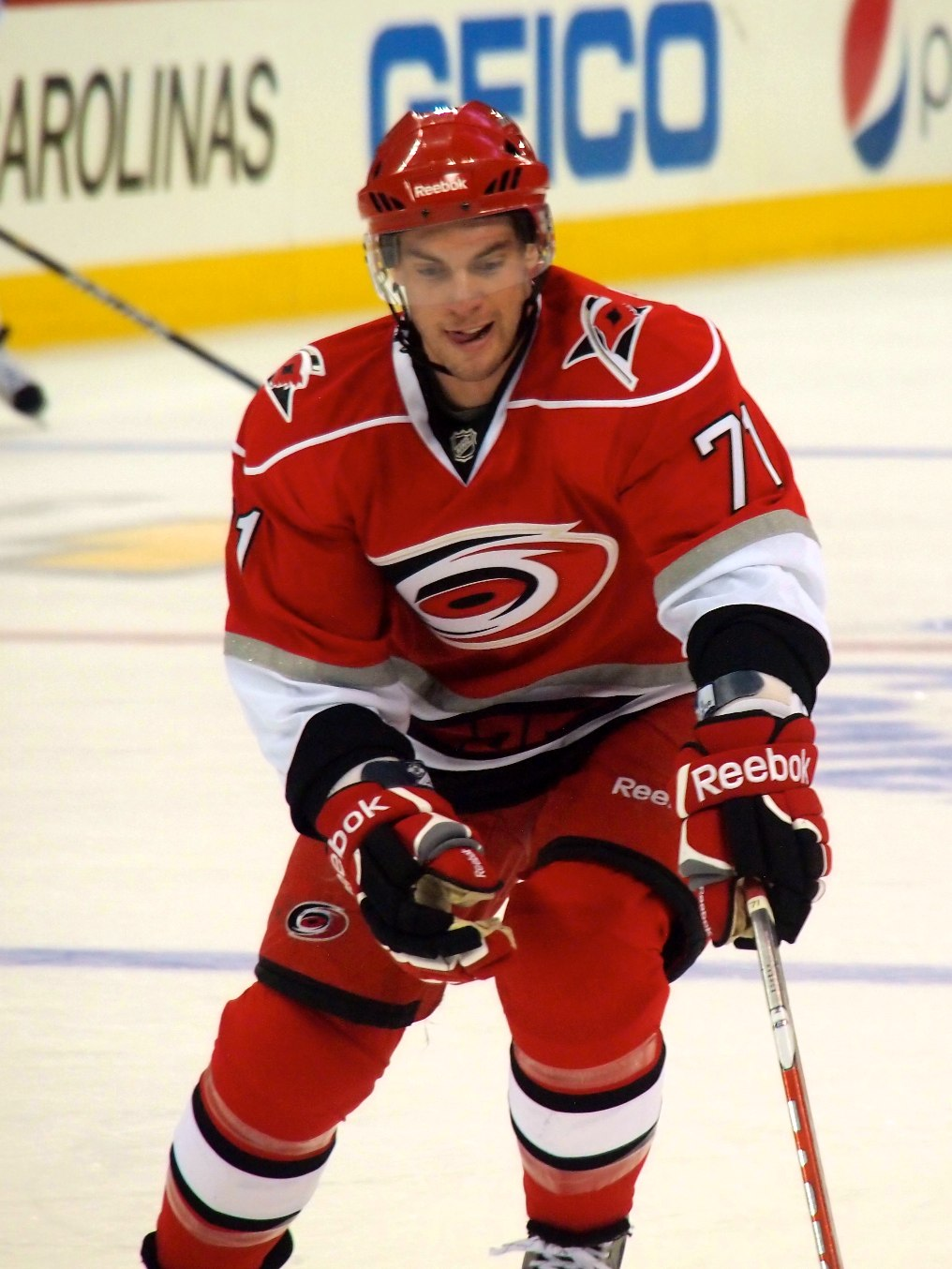
- Born: September 4, 1987 (age 38) Greenfield Park, Quebec, Canada
- Height: 6 ft 0 in (183 cm)
- Weight: 188 lb (85 kg; 13 st 6 lb)
- Position: Right wing
- Shot: Right
- Played for: Carolina Hurricanes; EHC Biel; EHC München; Schwenninger Wild Wings; Vienna Capitals
- NHL draft: Undrafted
- Playing career: 2007–2018

Jérôme Samson (born September 4, 1987) is a Canadian former professional ice hockey winger. He played in the National Hockey League (NHL) with the Carolina Hurricanes.

== Playing career ==
Undrafted, Samson was signed by the Carolina Hurricanes on July 2, 2007. During the 2009–10 season, Samson made his NHL debut with the Hurricanes and assisted on a Rod Brind'Amour goal on his first shift against the Nashville Predators on January 7, 2010.

He scored his first NHL goal on January 10, 2012 against Sergei Bobrovsky of the Philadelphia Flyers.

On July 5, 2013, Samson left the Hurricanes organization as a free agent and signed a one-year contract with the Winnipeg Jets. In his single season in 2013–14 within the Jets organization, Samson was assigned to AHL affiliate, the St. John's IceCaps.

On July 10, 2014, Samson agreed to a one-year, two-way contract with the Tampa Bay Lightning. During the 2014–15 season, on January 6, 2015, he was released from his contract to join EHC Biel of the Swiss National League A. Samson recorded 1 goal and 7 assists in 26 games with the Syracuse Crunch, a major performance drop form the 27 goal, 29 assist season he had in the 2013–14 AHL season.

On June 2, 2015, Samson continued in Europe to sign a one-year contract in Germany with EHC München of the Deutsche Eishockey Liga (DEL). He captured the German championship with the München team in 2016 and left the club afterwards, signing a deal with fellow DEL team Schwenninger Wild Wings in July 2016. In the 2016–17 season, Samson played amongst the top two scoring lines with the Wild Wings, besting his previous year with 13 goals and 24 points in 51 games. On March 3, 2017, it was announced that Samson would leave the club as a free agent.

On May 5, 2017, Samson signed as a free agent with the Vienna Capitals of the Austrian Hockey League (EBEL) for the 2017–18 season. The contract was cancelled in November 2017 after he suffered a concussion during a game against KAC on 15 October.

== Career statistics ==
			Regular season					Playoffs
Season	Team	League	GP	G	A	Pts	PIM	GP	G	A	Pts	PIM
2004–05	Moncton Wildcats	QMJHL	63	6	11	17	22	12	1	4	5	8
2005–06	Moncton Wildcats	QMJHL	62	20	32	52	46	21	6	12	18	15
2006–07	Moncton Wildcats	QMJHL	38	19	33	52	20	—	—	—	—	—
2006–07	Val-d'Or Foreurs	QMJHL	33	25	22	47	16	20	14	12	26	10
2007–08	Albany River Rats	AHL	65	21	18	39	38	7	1	1	2	2
2008–09	Albany River Rats	AHL	70	22	32	54	56	—	—	—	—	—
2009–10	Albany River Rats	AHL	74	37	41	78	66	8	6	3	9	8
2009–10	Carolina Hurricanes	NHL	7	0	2	2	10	—	—	—	—	—
2010–11	Charlotte Checkers	AHL	53	26	28	54	44	—	—	—	—	—
2010–11	Carolina Hurricanes	NHL	23	0	2	2	0	—	—	—	—	—
2011–12	Charlotte Checkers	AHL	57	20	17	37	26	—	—	—	—	—
2011–12	Carolina Hurricanes	NHL	16	2	3	5	8	—	—	—	—	—
2012–13	Charlotte Checkers	AHL	37	7	11	18	27	—	—	—	—	—
2013–14	St. John's IceCaps	AHL	68	27	29	56	49	17	3	3	6	4
2014–15	Syracuse Crunch	AHL	26	1	7	8	14	—	—	—	—	—
2014–15	EHC Biel	NLA	12	5	4	9	40	6	1	0	1	0
2015–16	EHC München	DEL	38	12	8	20	83	14	5	6	11	2
2016–17	Schwenninger Wild Wings	DEL	51	13	11	24	34	—	—	—	—	—
2017–18	Vienna Capitals	EBEL	11	2	2	4	2	—	—	—	—	—
NHL totals			46	2	7	9	18	—	—	—	—	—
