= Kevin Doell =

Canadian ice hockey player (born 1979)

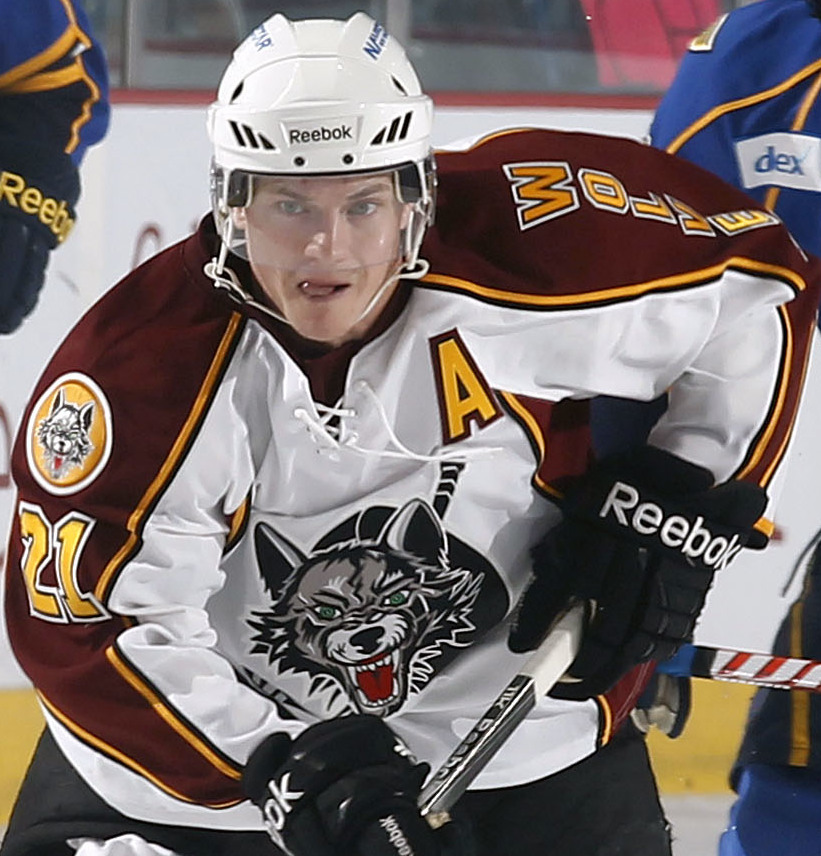
- Doell with the Chicago Wolves in 2012
- Born: July 15, 1979 (age 46) Saskatoon, Saskatchewan, Canada
- Height: 5 ft 11 in (180 cm)
- Weight: 190 lb (86 kg; 13 st 8 lb)
- Position: Centre
- Shot: Right
- Played for: Atlanta Thrashers; Leksands IF; Tappara Tampere; EC KAC; VIK Västerås HK; SG Cortina
- NHL draft: Undrafted
- Playing career: 2003–2014

Kevin G. Doell (born July 15, 1979) is a Canadian former professional ice hockey forward. He played in the National Hockey League (NHL) with the Atlanta Thrashers.

== Playing career ==
Doell grew up in Saskatoon playing his last year of minor hockey for the AAA Saskatoon Blazers Midgets of the SMHL. He then moved onto play for the Melfort Mustangs Jr.A. team of the SJHL.

Undrafted, Doell played for the University of Denver Pioneers, where he was an All-WCHA selection in 2003. After completing his collegiate career Doell was invited to the Atlanta Thrashers training camp on September 12, 2003. Reassigned from the Thrashers training camp to AHL affiliate, the Chicago Wolves, Doell signed a one-year contract at the start of the 2003–04 season.

After his first professional season within Atlanta's affiliate teams, Doell was selected in the ECHL All-Rookie Team and named the ECHL's Rookie of the year after posting 74 points in 63 games with the Gwinnett Gladiators. He was then signed by the Thrashers to his first NHL contract on June 30, 2004. Although primarily an AHL player, Doell briefly played in the National Hockey League, playing his first NHL game for the Atlanta Thrashers on January 4, 2008 against the Carolina Hurricanes. He played eight games for the Thrashers before returning to the AHL Chicago Wolves.

In 2008–09, Doell played for the Swedish team Leksands IF in the second tier HockeyAllsvenskan League. Finishing an impressive fourth on the team with 49 points Kevin returned to play again with the Chicago Wolves in the AHL for the 2009–10 season.

After spending the 2010–11 season abroad in Finland with Tappara of the SM-liiga, Doell signed a one-year contract to return for his third stint with the Chicago Wolves on June 21, 2011. Following the 2011–12 season with the Wolves, Doell returned to Europe for a further two seasons before closing out his professional career.

== Career statistics ==
			Regular season					Playoffs
Season	Team	League	GP	G	A	Pts	PIM	GP	G	A	Pts	PIM
1997–98	Melfort Mustangs	SJHL	62	20	24	44	156	4	1	0	1	4
1998–99	Melfort Mustangs	SJHL	66	54	87	141	169	—	—	—	—	—
1999–00	University of Denver	WCHA	40	8	15	23	18	—	—	—	—	—
2000–01	University of Denver	WCHA	36	9	10	19	26	—	—	—	—	—
2001–02	University of Denver	WCHA	41	20	23	43	28	—	—	—	—	—
2002–03	University of Denver	WCHA	41	25	26	51	34	—	—	—	—	—
2003–04	Chicago Wolves	AHL	8	1	1	2	6	1	0	0	0	0
2003–04	Gwinnett Gladiators	ECHL	63	33	41	74	88	13	1	6	7	12
2004–05	Chicago Wolves	AHL	45	4	8	12	69	—	—	—	—	—
2004–05	Gwinnett Gladiators	ECHL	11	6	9	15	14	8	2	1	3	14
2005–06	Chicago Wolves	AHL	78	17	34	51	72	—	—	—	—	—
2006–07	Chicago Wolves	AHL	80	14	19	33	107	15	2	4	6	14
2007–08	Chicago Wolves	AHL	68	16	17	33	75	24	4	5	9	41
2007–08	Atlanta Thrashers	NHL	8	0	1	1	4	—	—	—	—	—
2008–09	Leksands IF	Allsv	37	22	27	49	105	10	4	4	8	18
2009–10	Chicago Wolves	AHL	79	16	21	37	69	9	3	0	3	2
2010–11	Tappara	SM-l	58	18	20	38	105	—	—	—	—	—
2011–12	Chicago Wolves	AHL	17	1	6	7	16	5	2	4	6	2
2012–13	EC KAC	EBEL	32	9	6	15	58	2	1	0	1	0
2013–14	VIK Västerås HK	Allsv	17	3	3	6	16	—	—	—	—	—
2013–14	SG Cortina	ITL	7	1	4	5	12	10	3	7	10	2
AHL totals			375	69	106	175	414	54	11	13	24	59
NHL totals			8	0	1	1	4	—	—	—	—	—

== Awards and honors ==
Award	Year
All-WCHA Third Team	2002–03
