= Brock Trotter =

Canadian professional ice hockey Centre (born 1987)

- Born: January 16, 1987 (age 39) Brandon, Manitoba, Canada
- Height: 5 ft 10 in (178 cm)
- Weight: 185 lb (84 kg; 13 st 3 lb)
- Position: Centre
- Shoots: Right
- team Former teams: Free Agent; Montreal Canadiens; Dinamo Riga; KHL Medveščak Zagreb; IF Björklöven; SaiPa; Oulun Kärpät; Dornbirn Bulldogs; HKM Zvolen; Dragons de Rouen; ASC Corona Brasov; Starbulls Rosenheim
- NHL draft: Undrafted
- Playing career: 2007–present

Brock Alexander Trotter (born January 16, 1987) is a Canadian professional ice hockey centre who was most recently under contract to Starbulls Rosenheim of the German Oberliga. He played two games in the National Hockey League with the Montreal Canadiens during the 2009–10 season.

== Playing career ==
Trotter played collegiate hockey at the University of Denver in the Western Collegiate Hockey Association.

On April 15, 2008, Trotter was recalled from the Hamilton Bulldogs of the American Hockey League. He was expected to play his first NHL game on April 19, 2008, against the Boston Bruins but was a late scratch. In the 2009–10 season on February 5, 2010, he was again recalled from Hamilton Bulldogs to Montreal. He finally made his NHL debut on February 6, 2010, against the Pittsburgh Penguins in a 5–3 victory. Playing with Bulldogs teammates Ryan White and David Desharnais, Trotter went scoreless in two games before returning to the Bulldogs to lead the team with 36 goals and place second to Desharnais with 77 points.

On July 28, 2010, Trotter left the Canadiens organization and North America as a free agent to sign a two-year contract with Latvian team Dinamo Riga of the KHL.

On July 4, 2011, Trotter signed a one-year, two-way contract to return with the Canadiens. Trotter's return to Montreal was short lived when on October 23, 2011, he was traded to the Phoenix Coyotes along with a seventh-round pick in the 2012 NHL entry draft in exchange for forward Petteri Nokelainen and defenceman Garrett Stafford. He was then assigned to the Coyotes' AHL affiliate, the Portland Pirates. Trotter joined his third team in the 2011–12 season, when he was reassigned by the Coyotes as a part of an AHL trade for goaltender Peter Mannino and Kenndal McArdle to the St. John's IceCaps on March 2, 2012.

After sitting out two consecutive seasons with injury, Trotter opted to make a return to professional hockey by signing a one-month trial contract with Croatian club KHL Medveščak Zagreb of the KHL on June 24, 2014.

During the 2015–16 off season Trotter attended training camp with the Manitoba Moose of the American Hockey League. On October 16, 2015, Trotter signed a one-year contract with Swedish club IF Björklöven of the second-tier league Hockeyallsvenskan. He spent the 2016–17 season playing in Finland's top-flight Liiga (SaiPa, Oulun Kärpät), before signing with ERC Ingolstadt of the German Deutsche Eishockey Liga in July 2017.

Before opening the 2017–18 season, Trotter was released from his contract with Ingolstadt, opting to return to North America and secure an opening night roster spot on a professional try-out with the Chicago Wolves of the AHL on October 6, 2017. He recorded 1 assist in 4 games before he was later released by the Wolves on October 25, 2017. He later joined the Stavanger Oilers of the GET-ligaen, however, he never made an appearance for the club before returning for a second stint with IF Björklöven on February 15, 2018.

In 2018–19, Trotter posted 55 points in 42 games for Dornbirner EC in the Austrian Hockey League. After spending the following season in the Slovak Extraliga with HKM Zvolen, Trotter left as a free agent and his KHL rights were reacquired by former club Dinamo Riga on May 5, 2020.

Trotter has since had spells in France with Dragons de Rouen, Romania with ASC Corona Brasov and Germany with Starbulls Rosenheim.

Then, in July 2022, Trotter signed a one-year deal with UK EIHL side Coventry Blaze. However, in August 2022, it was announced Trotter would no longer be joining Coventry.

== Career statistics ==
=== Regular season and playoffs ===
			Regular season					Playoffs
Season	Team	League	GP	G	A	Pts	PIM	GP	G	A	Pts	PIM
2003–04	Dauphin Kings	MJHL	63	32	33	65	108	—	—	—	—	—
2004–05	Lincoln Stars	USHL	60	20	38	58	84	4	2	3	5	0
2005–06	University of Denver	WCHA	5	3	2	5	2	—	—	—	—	—
2006–07	University of Denver	WCHA	40	16	24	40	22	—	—	—	—	—
2007–08	University of Denver	WCHA	24	13	18	31	18	—	—	—	—	—
2007–08	Hamilton Bulldogs	AHL	21	3	6	9	4	—	—	—	—	—
2008–09	Hamilton Bulldogs	AHL	76	18	31	49	32	6	0	1	1	13
2009–10	Hamilton Bulldogs	AHL	75	36	41	77	56	19	8	11	19	14
2009–10	Montreal Canadiens	NHL	2	0	0	0	0	—	—	—	—	—
2010–11	Dinamo Riga	KHL	49	9	17	26	38	11	4	5	9	10
2011–12	Hamilton Bulldogs	AHL	5	2	5	7	4	—	—	—	—	—
2011–12	Portland Pirates	AHL	35	12	19	31	16	—	—	—	—	—
2011–12	St. John's IceCaps	AHL	2	0	0	0	4	15	5	6	11	12
2014–15	KHL Medveščak Zagreb	KHL	16	1	5	6	41	—	—	—	—	—
2014–15	Dinamo Riga	KHL	16	1	1	2	14	—	—	—	—	—
2015–16	IF Björklöven	Allsv	35	6	20	26	16	—	—	—	—	—
2016–17	SaiPa	Liiga	33	8	11	19	12	—	—	—	—	—
2016–17	Oulun Kärpät	Liiga	9	4	8	12	4	2	1	1	2	0
2017–18	Chicago Wolves	AHL	4	0	1	1	0	—	—	—	—	—
2018–19	Dornbirn Bulldogs	EBEL	42	14	41	55	40	—	—	—	—	—
2019–20	HKM Zvolen	Slovak	51	14	46	60	78	—	—	—	—	—
2020–21	Dragons de Rouen	Ligue Magnus	20	5	10	15	30	—	—	—	—	—
2021–22	ASC Corona Brasov	Erste Liga	11	9	14	23	14	—	—	—	—	—
2021–22	ASC Corona Brasov	Romania	1	0	1	1	0	—	—	—	—	—
2021–22	Starbulls Rosenheim	Oberliga	9	1	10	11	6	—	—	—	—	—
NHL totals			2	0	0	0	0	—	—	—	—	—
KHL totals			81	11	23	34	93	11	4	5	9	10

=== International ===
Year	Team	Event	Result	GP	G	A	Pts	PIM
2004	Canada Western	U17	6th	5	2	2	4	0
Junior totals				5	2	2	4	0

== Awards and honours ==
Award	Year
MJHL
All-Rookie Team	2004
