= Nick Dodge =

Canadian ice hockey player (born 1986)

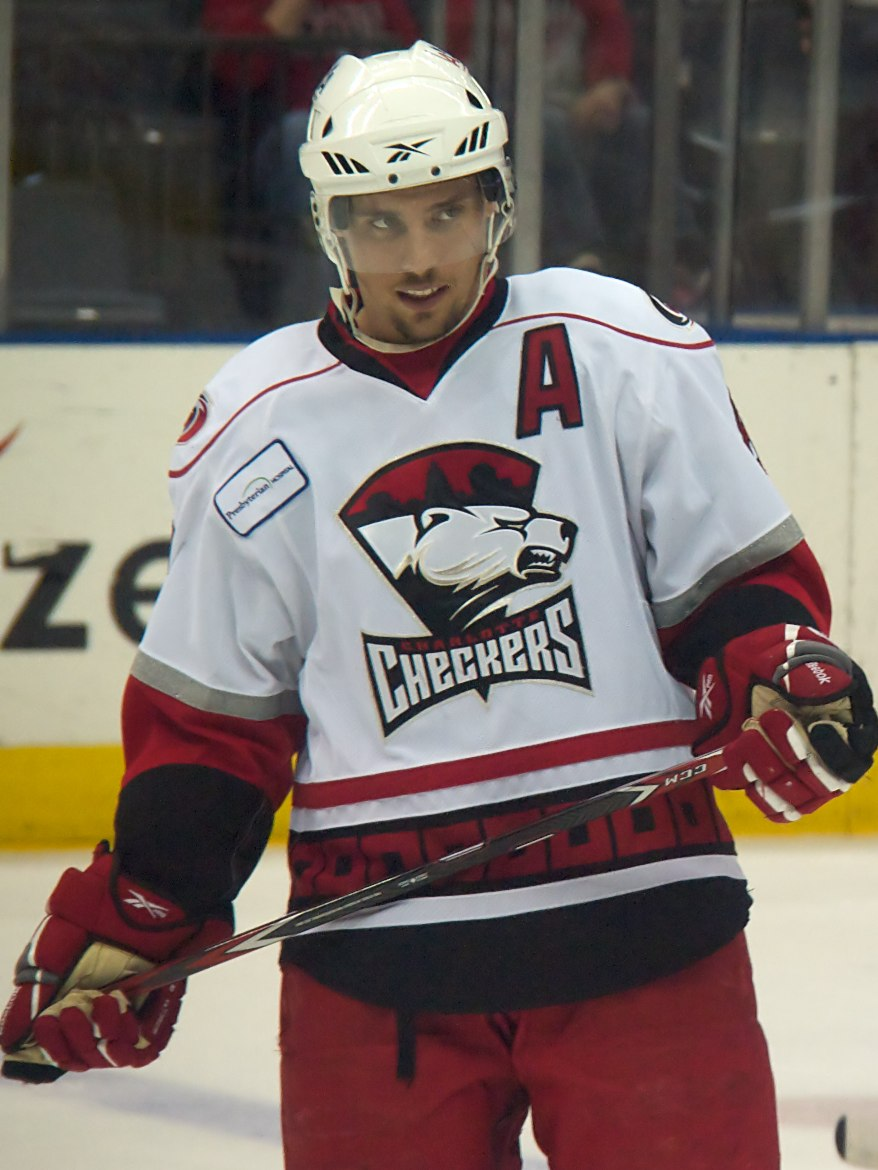
- Born: May 1, 1986 (age 40) Oakville, Ontario, Canada
- Height: 5 ft 10 in (178 cm)
- Weight: 175 lb (79 kg; 12 st 7 lb)
- Position: Right wing
- Shot: Right
- Played for: Albany River Rats; Charlotte Checkers
- NHL draft: 183rd overall, 2006; Carolina Hurricanes
- Playing career: 2008–2011

Nick Dodge (born 1 May 1986) is a Canadian former professional ice hockey right wing. He was drafted by the Carolina Hurricanes in the 6th round (183rd overall) of the 2006 NHL entry draft.

== Playing career ==
Born in Oakville, Ontario, Dodge played junior hockey with the Oakville Blades in the OPJHL before playing four years (2004–08) of ECAC college hockey with the Clarkson Golden Knights team at Clarkson University.

Dodge turned professional for the 2008–09 season, suiting up for the Hurricanes' AHL affiliate, the Albany River Rats. Dodge played out his three-year entry-level contract within the Hurricanes AHL affiliates, in the River Rats and the Charlotte Checkers, before retiring from professional hockey having played in 217 AHL games.

== Career statistics ==
			Regular season					Playoffs
Season	Team	League	GP	G	A	Pts	PIM	GP	G	A	Pts	PIM
2002–03	Oakville Blades	OPJHL	39	17	26	43	27	—	—	—	—	—
2003–04	Oakville Blades	OPJHL	45	33	45	78	27	—	—	—	—	—
2004–05	Clarkson University	ECAC	37	6	12	18	42	—	—	—	—	—
2005–06	Clarkson University	ECAC	38	16	25	41	72	—	—	—	—	—
2006–07	Clarkson University	ECAC	36	18	21	39	32	—	—	—	—	—
2007–08	Clarkson University	ECAC	39	12	14	26	26	—	—	—	—	—
2008–09	Albany River Rats	AHL	80	13	26	39	34	—	—	—	—	—
2009–10	Albany River Rats	AHL	80	16	20	36	30	8	4	1	5	6
2010–11	Charlotte Checkers	AHL	57	5	8	13	18	16	4	2	6	8
AHL totals			217	34	54	88	82	24	8	3	11	14

== Awards and honours ==
Award	Year
College
All-ECAC Hockey Third Team	2005–06
All-ECAC Hockey First Team	2006–07
AHCA East Second-Team All-American	2006–07

Awards and achievements
Preceded by Kyle Rank	ECAC Hockey Best Defensive Forward; 2007–08	Succeeded by Tyler Mugford
