= Cory Quirk =

American ice hockey player

- Born: July 3, 1986 (age 39) Brockton, Massachusetts, U.S.
- Height: 5 ft 9 in (175 cm)
- Weight: 181 lb (82 kg; 12 st 13 lb)
- Position: Centre
- Shoots: Left
- DEL team Former teams: Fischtown Pinguins; AHL; Albany River Rats; Worcester Sharks; Europe; Starbulls Rosenheim; JYP Jyväskylä (SM-liiga); JYP-Akatemia (Mestis); Hannover Scorpions (DEL); SønderjyskE Ishockey
- NHL draft: Undrafted
- Playing career: 2009–present

Cory Quirk (born July 3, 1986) is a retired American professional ice hockey player. He last played for the Fischtown Pinguins in the German DEL.

== Career ==
Quirk played for the Waterloo Black Hawks of the USHL, where he was named Rookie of the Year and received an award for his community service. He graduated from Catholic Memorial High School (Boston, Massachusetts), where his team won the state championship in three of his four years.

He attended the University of Massachusetts, Amherst, where he majored in psychology, from 2005 to 2009, serving as team co-captain his senior year. He left UMass as the program's all-time leader in games played (150) and became the eighth player in UMass history to score at least 100 points, ranking him sixth all-time.

Coming out of college in March 2009, Quirk penned an amateur tryout contract with the Albany River Rats of the American Hockey League (AHL). In July 2009, he joined fellow AHL team Worcester Sharks and remained with the team until the end of the 2010–11 season.

He then spent the 2011–12 season with the Starbulls Rosenheim of the German second division, before moving on to JYP Jyväskylä of Finland the following season. He transferred from JYP to the Hannover Scorpions of the German top-flight Deutsche Eishockey Liga (DEL) in January 2013 and remained with the club for the remainder of the season.

Quirk continued his pro career at SønderjyskE Ishockey in the Danish AL-Bank Ligaen, the top league in Denmark. During his three-year stint with the club (2013–2016), he helped SønderjyskE win the 2014 and 2015 Danish championship and was selected to play in the Danish All-Star Game each year. He played a total of 163 league games for the team, scoring 106 goals, while dishing out 128 assists. Quirk also competed in the Champions Hockey League with the Vojens-based club.

In April 2016, he signed a two-year contract with German DEL outfit Fischtown Pinguins.

In April 2017, Quirk extended his contract for three years, until the 2020/2021 season, with Fischtown Pinguins of the DEL.
