= Ryan Russell (ice hockey) =

Canadian ice hockey player

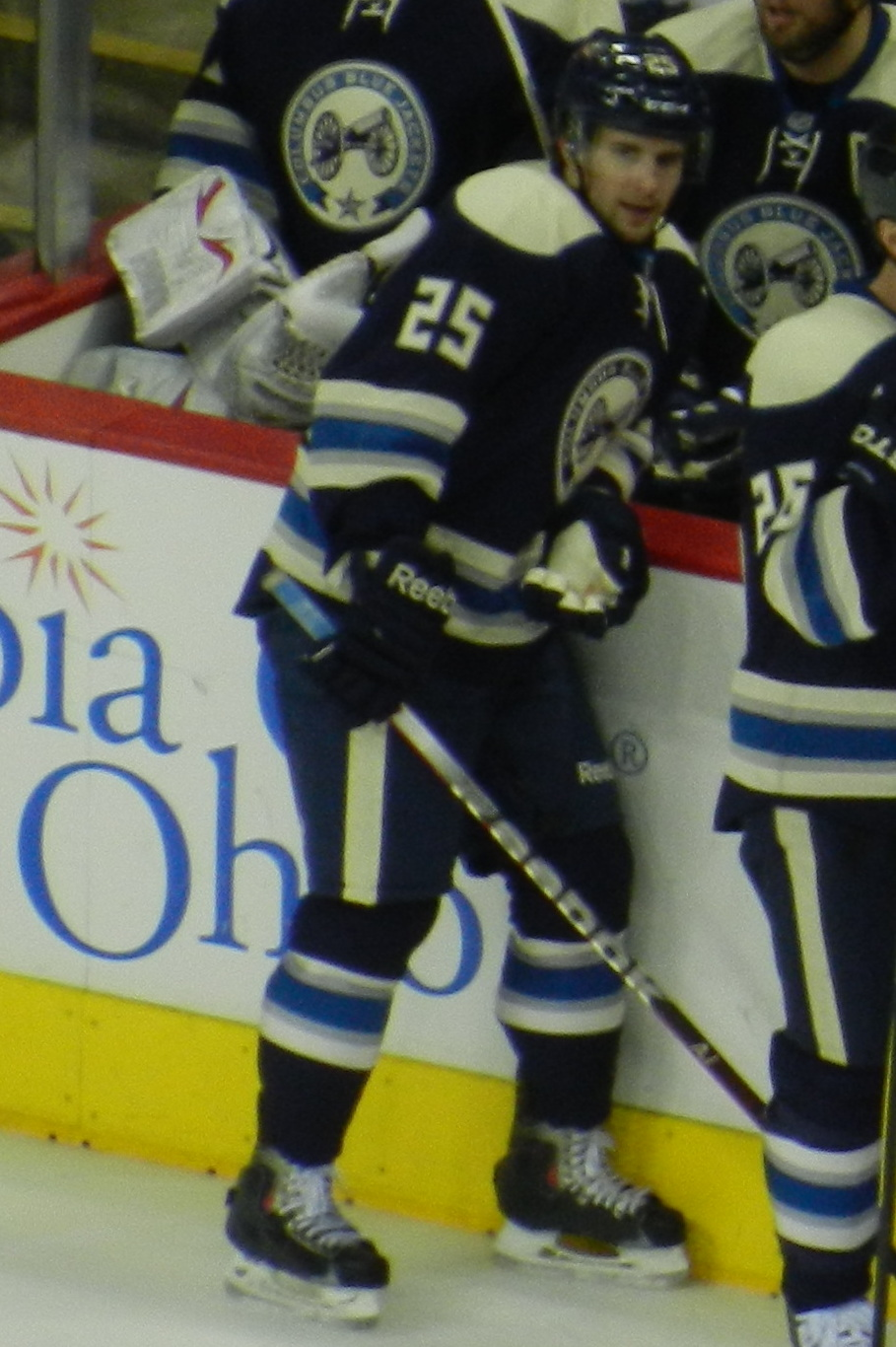
- Born: May 2, 1987 (age 39) Red Deer, Alberta, Canada
- Height: 5 ft 10 in (178 cm)
- Weight: 174 lb (79 kg; 12 st 6 lb)
- Position: Center
- Shot: Left
- Played for: Columbus Blue Jackets; Leksands IF; Cardiff Devils
- NHL draft: 211th overall, 2005; New York Rangers
- Playing career: 2007–2016

Ryan Russell (born May 2, 1987) is a Canadian former professional ice hockey forward. He played in the National Hockey League (NHL) with the Columbus Blue Jackets. Russell has a twin brother, Kris, who played for the Edmonton Oilers.

== Playing career ==
Russell was drafted by the New York Rangers in the 2005 NHL entry draft (7th round, 211th overall). He was drafted from the Kootenay Ice in the WHL where he played from 2003 till 2007. After the 2006–07 season with the Ice, Russell was unable to come to terms with the Rangers and was traded to the Montreal Canadiens for a seventh round pick in the 2007 NHL entry draft on May 31, 2007. He was swiftly signed to a three-year entry-level contract by the Canadiens.

In his first professional season in 2007–08, Russell split the year between both affiliates of the Canadiens the Cincinnati Cyclones in the ECHL and the Hamilton Bulldogs of the AHL. While with the Cyclones, he scored a series-winning shorthanded goal in overtime of Game Five to send the Cyclones into the Kelly Cup Finals. They went on to win the Kelly Cup in six games. On July 20, 2010, Russell was re-signed by the Canadiens as a restricted free agent to a one-year contract.

On July 7, 2011, Russell was traded to the Columbus Blue Jackets for Michael Blunden. He joined his brother Kris Russell with the Blue Jackets organization.

On January 7, 2012, Russell made his NHL debut with the Blue Jackets in a 1–0 win over the Los Angeles Kings. On January 13, 2012, Russell scored his first NHL goal against Jason LaBarbera of the Phoenix Coyotes.

As a free agent, on July 29, 2013, Russell signed his first European contract, agreeing to a one-year deal with Leksands IF of the Swedish Hockey League. He resigned after his first season with Leksands.

On January 11, 2016, Russell joined the Cardiff Devils of the Elite Ice Hockey League (EIHL) in the United Kingdom. Russell made his debut for the Cardiff Devils at home versus the Belfast Giants, scoring 2 points with a goal and an assist, earning him a man of the match accolade.

== Career statistics ==
			Regular season					Playoffs
Season	Team	League	GP	G	A	Pts	PIM	GP	G	A	Pts	PIM
2003–04	Kootenay Ice	WHL	67	3	9	12	27	4	0	0	0	0
2004–05	Kootenay Ice	WHL	66	32	21	53	18	16	6	7	13	12
2005–06	Kootenay Ice	WHL	72	33	42	75	30	6	3	5	8	2
2006–07	Kootenay Ice	WHL	58	30	46	76	40	7	3	6	9	2
2007–08	Hamilton Bulldogs	AHL	25	2	1	3	4	—	—	—	—	—
2007–08	Cincinnati Cyclones	ECHL	12	6	4	10	4	15	3	4	7	0
2008–09	Hamilton Bulldogs	AHL	79	20	19	39	24	6	1	3	4	2
2009–10	Hamilton Bulldogs	AHL	74	19	18	37	8	19	7	5	12	0
2010–11	Hamilton Bulldogs	AHL	65	10	11	21	48	20	7	2	9	0
2011–12	Springfield Falcons	AHL	31	9	6	15	15	—	—	—	—	—
2011–12	Columbus Blue Jackets	NHL	41	2	0	2	2	—	—	—	—	—
2012–13	Springfield Falcons	AHL	62	10	6	16	16	7	1	3	4	4
2013–14	Leksands IF	SHL	51	2	6	8	4	3	0	1	1	0
2014–15	Leksands IF	SHL	32	0	2	2	8	7	0	2	2	0
2015–16	Cardiff Devils	EIHL	17	5	13	18	6	4	1	1	2	2
AHL totals			336	70	61	131	115	52	16	13	29	6
NHL totals			41	2	0	2	2	—	—	—	—	—
