= 2009 Calder Cup playoffs =

North American ice hockey tournament

Tournament details
- Dates: April 15 – June 12, 2009
- Teams: 16

Final positions
- Champions: Hershey Bears
- Runners-up: Manitoba Moose

The 2009 Calder Cup playoffs of the American Hockey League (AHL) began on April 15, 2009. The 16 teams that qualified, 8 from each conference, played best-of-seven series for division semifinals, finals and conference finals. The conference champions then played a best-of-seven series for the Calder Cup. The Hershey Bears defeated the Manitoba Moose four games to two in the finals to win the Calder Cup.

== Playoff seeds ==
After the 2008–09 AHL regular season, 16 teams qualified for the playoffs. The top four teams from each division qualified for the playoffs.

=== Eastern Conference ===
==== Atlantic Division ====
1. Hartford Wolf Pack – 99 points
2. Providence Bruins – 94 points
3. Portland Pirates – 88 points
4. Worcester Sharks – 87 points

==== East Division ====
1. Hershey Bears – 106 points
2. Bridgeport Sound Tigers – 106 points
3. Wilkes-Barre/Scranton Penguins – 104 points
4. Philadelphia Phantoms – 93 points

=== Western Conference ===
==== North Division ====
1. Manitoba Moose – 107 points
2. Hamilton Bulldogs – 102 points
3. Grand Rapids Griffins – 98 points
4. Toronto Marlies – 90 points

==== West Division ====
1. Milwaukee Admirals – 107 points
2. Peoria Rivermen – 92 points
3. Houston Aeros – 87 points
4. Rockford IceHogs – 86 points

== Bracket ==
Division Semifinals	Division Finals
A1	Hartford	2
A4	Worcester	4
A4	Worcester	2
Atlantic Division
A2	Providence	4
A2	Providence	4
A3	Portland	1
Eastern Conference
E1	Hershey	4
E4	Philadelphia	0
E1	Hershey	4
East Division
E3	Wilkes-Barre/Scranton	3
E2	Bridgeport	1
E3	Wilkes-Barre/Scranton	4
N1	Manitoba	4
N4	Toronto	2
N1	Manitoba	4
North Division
N3	Grand Rapids	0
N2	Hamilton	2
N3	Grand Rapids	4
Western Conference
W1	Milwaukee	4
W4	Rockford	0
W1	Milwaukee	3
West Division
W3	Houston	4
W2	Peoria	3
W3	Houston	4

Conference Finals
A2	Providence	1
E1	Hershey	4
N1	Manitoba	4
W3	Houston	2

Calder Cup Final
E1	Hershey	4
N1	Manitoba	2

In each round, the team that earned more points during the regular season receives home ice advantage, meaning they receive the "extra" game on home-ice if the series reaches the maximum number of games. There is no set series format due to arena scheduling conflicts and travel considerations.

== Statistical leaders ==
=== Skaters ===
These are the top ten skaters based on points.

Player	Team	GP	G	A	Pts	+/–	PIM
Alexandre Giroux	Hershey Bears	22	15	13	28	+3	22
Corey Locke	Houston Aeros	20	12	11	23	-9	32
Jason Krog	Manitoba Moose	22	8	15	23	+9	0
Keith Aucoin	Hershey Bears	21	5	18	23	+9	16
Chris Bourque	Hershey Bears	22	5	16	21	+2	30
Jason Jaffray	Manitoba Moose	22	9	10	19	+7	12
Michael Grabner	Manitoba Moose	20	10	7	17	+11	2
Matt Beaudoin	Houston Aeros	20	8	9	17	-4	12
Martin St. Pierre	Providence Bruins	16	5	11	16	-1	26
Brad Marchand	Providence Bruins	16	7	8	15	-2	26

GP = Games played; G = Goals; A = Assists; Pts = Points; +/– = Plus/minus; PIM = Penalty minutes

All statistics as of: 08:54, 26 April 2010 (UTC)

=== Leading goaltenders ===
These are the top five goaltenders based on both goals against average and save percentage with at least one game played (Note: list is sorted by goals against average).

Player	Team	GP	W	L	SA	GA	GAA	SV%	SO	TOI
Drew MacIntyre	Milwaukee Admirals	11	7	4	261	18	1.65	.931	1	655
Matt Climie	Houston Aeros	5	1	1	109	6	1.88	.945	0	191
Michal Neuvirth	Hershey Bears	22	16	6	633	43	1.92	.932	4	1346
Adam Berkhoel	Wilkes-Barre/Scranton Penguins	6	3	2	189	12	2.12	.937	0	340
Cory Schneider	Manitoba Moose	22	14	7	600	47	2.15	.922	0	1315

GP = Games played; W = Wins; L = Losses; SA = Shots against; GA = Goals against; GAA = Goals against average; SV% = Save percentage; SO = Shutouts; TOI = Time on ice (in minutes)

All statistics as of: 08:54, 26 April 2010 (UTC)

== Division Semifinals ==
Note 1: All times are in Eastern Daylight Time (UTC−4).
Note 2: Home team is listed first.

=== Eastern Conference ===
==== Atlantic Division ====
===== (A1) Hartford Wolf Pack vs. (A4) Worcester Sharks =====
April 16	Hartford Wolf Pack	2 – 0	Worcester Sharks	XL Center	Recap
No Scoring		First period	No scoring
Artem Anisimov 1 – 04:19		Second period	No scoring
Dane Byers 1 – 07:20		Third period	No scoring
Matt Zaba 38 saves / 38 shots		Goalie stats	Thomas Greiss 21 saves / 23 shots

April 18	Hartford Wolf Pack	5 – 3	Worcester Sharks	XL Center	Recap
Artem Anisimov 2 – pp – 03:40; Jordan Owens 1 – 07:08; Bobby Sanguinetti 1 – 12:01		First period	No scoring
No scoring		Second period	09:51 – Brendan Buckley 1; 10:20 – Andrew Desjardins 1; 14:40 – pp – Cory Larose 1
Mike Ouellette 1 – 02:23; Mark Bell 1 – sh/en – 19:55		Third period	No scoring
Matt Zaba 45 saves / 48 shots		Goalie stats	Thomas Greiss 14 saves / 18 shots

April 20	Worcester Sharks	3 – 2	2OT	Hartford Wolf Pack	DCU Center	Recap
Tom Cavanaugh 1 – 18:42		First period		14:16 – pp – Corey Potter 1
Ryan Vesce 1 – 06:25		Second period		05:01 – Dale Weise 1
No scoring		Third period		No scoring
Ryan Vesce 2 – 01:07		Second overtime period		No scoring
Thomas Greiss 34 saves / 36 shots		Goalie stats		Matt Zaba 42 saves / 45 shots

April 22	Worcester Sharks	6 – 0	Hartford Wolf Pack	DCU Center	Recap
Frazer McLaren 1 – 03:19		First period	No Scoring
No scoring		Second period	No scoring
Logan Couture 1 – 01:23; Lukas Kaspar 1 – 03:45; Ryan Vesce 3 – 06:16; Tom Cavanaugh 2 – 07:21; T. J. Fox 1 – 19:13		Third period	No scoring
Thomas Greiss 30 saves / 30 shots		Goalie stats	Matt Zaba 21 saves / 27 shots

April 23	Hartford Wolf Pack	1 – 3	Worcester Sharks	XL Center	Recap
No Scoring		First period	05:56 – pp – Patrick Traverse 1; 07:15 – T. J. Fox 2; 13:50 – pp – Patrick Traverse 2
No scoring		Second period	No scoring
Dane Byers 2 – pp – 13:33		Third period	No scoring
Matt Zaba 23 saves / 26 shots		Goalie stats	Thomas Greiss 27 saves / 28 shots

April 25	Worcester Sharks	5 – 3	Hartford Wolf Pack	DCU Center	Recap
Andrew Desjardins 2 – 03:53; Lukas Kaspar 2 – 12:17; Dan Da Silva 1 – 14:29		First period	06:31 – pp – Dane Byers 3
Dan Da Silva 2 – pp – 16:52		Second period	05:53 – Dale Weise 2
Logan Couture 2 – 13:18		Third period	18:53 – Dale Weise 3
Thomas Greiss 27 saves / 30 shots		Goalie stats	Matt Zaba 28 saves / 33 shots

Worcester won series 4–2

===== (A2) Providence Bruins vs. (A3) Portland Pirates =====
April 15	Providence Bruins	0 – 3	Portland Pirates	Dunkin' Donuts Center	Recap
No Scoring		First period	04:23 – Marek Zagrapan 1
No scoring		Second period	No scoring
No scoring		Third period	01:42 – Felix Schutz 1; 19:02 – en – Marek Zagrapan
Tuukka Rask 30 saves / 32 shots		Goalie stats	Jhonas Enroth 28 saves / 28 shots

April 17	Providence Bruins	2 – 1	Portland Pirates	Dunkin' Donuts Center	Recap
No Scoring		First period	No scoring
Vladimir Sobotka 1 – 02:01		Second period	No scoring
Jeremy Reich 1 – 10:32		Third period	03:33 – sh – Tyler Bouck
Tuukka Rask 27 saves / 28 shots		Goalie stats	Jhonas Enroth 38 saves / 40 shots

April 19	Portland Pirates	1 – 5	Providence Bruins	Cumberland County Civic Center	Recap
No scoring		First period	13:58 – Martin St. Pierre 1
No scoring		Second period	00:59 – Brad Marchand 1; 03:16 – sh – Vladimir Sobotka 2; 07:33 – pp – Johnny Boychuk 1
Derek Whitmore 1 – 11:57		Third period	01:21 – pp – Johnny Boychuk 2
Jhonas Enroth 20 saves / 24 shots Kellen Briggs 19 saves / 20 shots		Goalie stats	Tuukka Rask 25 saves / 26 shots

April 23	Portland Pirates	1 – 2	Providence Bruins	Cumberland County Civic Center	Recap
Mark Mancari 1 – 11:55		First period	No Scoring
No scoring		Second period	17:13 – Brad Marchand 2; 19:43 – Kirk MacDonald 1
No scoring		Third period	No scoring
Jhonas Enroth 35 saves / 37 shots		Goalie stats	Tuukka Rask 31 saves / 32 shots

April 24	Providence Bruins	2 – 1	Portland Pirates	Dunkin' Donuts Center	Recap
No Scoring		First period	10:25 – pp – Mike Kostka 1
Jordan Knackstedt 1 – 05:46; Peter Schaefer 1 – pp – 19:15		Second period	No scoring
No scoring		Third period	No scoring
Tuukka Rask 29 saves / 30 shots		Goalie stats	Jhonas Enroth 36 saves / 38 shots

Providence won series 4–1

==== East Division ====
===== (E1) Hershey Bears vs. (E4) Philadelphia Phantoms =====
April 16	Philadelphia Phantoms	2 – 4	Hershey Bears	Wachovia Spectrum	Recap
No scoring		First period	15:18 – Andrew Gordon 1
Jonathan Matsumoto 1 – 03:21		Second period	No scoring
Lasse Kukkonen 1 – 11:31		Third period	01:31 – pp – Kyle Wilson 1; 05:31 – Oskar Osala 1; 18:02 – Jay Beagle 1
Scott Munroe 27 saves / 31 shots		Goalie stats	Michal Neuvirth 30 saves / 32 shots

April 18	Philadelphia Phantoms	2 – 6	Hershey Bears	Wachovia Spectrum	Recap
Boyd Kane 1 – 00:53; Patrick Maroon 1 – 06:42		First period	11:03 – Bryan Helmer 1
No scoring		Second period	14:58 – pp – Staffan Kronwall 1
No scoring		Third period	02:27 - pp - Alexandre Giroux 1; 13:52 - Mathieu Perreault 1; 18:19 - en - Steve Pinizzotto 1; 19:33 - pp - Francois Bouchard 1
Scott Munroe 27 saves / 32 shots		Goalie stats	Michal Neuvirth 25 saves / 27 shots

April 22	Hershey Bears	3 – 2	Philadelphia Phantoms	GIANT Center	Recap
Staffan Kronwall 2 – pp – 08:27; Mathieu Perreault 2 – 19:33		First period	No scoring
No scoring		Second period	15:54 – Jon Kalinski 1
Alexandre Giroux 2 – pp – 01:20		Third period	06:19 – sh – Lasse Kukkonen 2
Michal Neuvirth 25 saves / 27 shots		Goalie stats	Scott Munroe 24 saves / 27 shots

April 24	Hershey Bears	1 – 0	Philadelphia Phantoms	GIANT Center	Recap
No Scoring		First period	No scoring
Graham Mink 1 – pp – 01:30		Second period	No scoring
No scoring		Third period	No scoring
Michal Neuvirth 23 saves / 23 shots		Goalie stats	Jean-Sebastien Aubin 29 saves / 30 shots

Hershey won series 4–0

Due to scheduling issues, Philadelphia hosted the first two games of the series. These would be their last 2 games in Philadelphia, as the team would move to Adiriondack after the season.

===== (E2) Bridgeport Sound Tigers vs. (E3) Wilkes-Barre/Scranton Penguins =====
April 17	Bridgeport Sound Tigers	2 – 3	Wilkes-Barre/Scranton Penguins	Arena at Harbor Yard	Recap
No Scoring		First period	01:22 – pp – Chris Minard 1; 18:51 – pp – Dustin Jeffrey 1
Trevor Smith 1 – 18:45		Second period	10:58 – Luca Caputi 1
Rob Hennigar 1 – 17:12		Third period	No scoring
Nathan Lawson		Goalie stats	John Curry

April 18	Bridgeport Sound Tigers	4 – 5	OT	Wilkes-Barre/Scranton Penguins	Arena at Harbor Yard	Recap
Micheal Haley 1 – 09:27; Kyle Okposo 1 – 12:13; Mike Iggulden 1 – pp – 17:25		First period		00:30 – Dustin Jeffrey 2; 11:58 – pp – Dustin Jeffrey 3
Jesse Joensuu 1 – 13:18		Second period		No scoring
No scoring		Third period		06:11 – Andy Wozniewski 1; 08:13 – Ben Lovejoy
No scoring		First overtime period		Chris Minard 2 – 04:54
Nathan Lawson 18 saves / 23 goals		Goalie stats		John Curry 33 saves / 37 shots

April 19	Wilkes-Barre/Scranton Penguins	4 – 5	OT	Bridgeport Sound Tigers	Wachovia Arena at Casey Plaza	Recap
No scoring		First period		15:04 – Jon Sim 1
Jean-Michel Daoust 1 – pp – 04:03; Jeff Taffe – pp – 05:55; Chris Minard 3 – pp – 11:15; Jean-Michel Daoust 2 – 12:54		Second period		17:13 – pp – Andrew MacDonald
No scoring		Third period		11:51 – Jon Sim; 15:46 – Joe Callahan
No scoring		First overtime period		09:48 – Sean Bentivoglio
John Curry 31 saves / 36 shots		Goalie stats		Peter Mannino 32 saves / 36 shots

April 22	Bridgeport Sound Tigers	1 – 2	Wilkes-Barre/Scranton Penguins	Arena at Harbor Yard	Recap
No Scoring		First period	15:04 – Chris Minard 4
No scoring		Second period	01:25 – pp – Jeff Taffe 2
Ben Walter – pp – 15:30		Third period	No scoring
Peter Mannino 19 saves / 21 shots		Goalie stats	John Curry 32 saves / 33 shots

April 24	Wilkes-Barre/Scranton Penguins	4 – 2	Bridgeport Sound Tigers	Wachovia Arena at Casey Plaza	Recap
Chris Minard 5 – pp – 07:37		First period	09:35 – Justin DiBendetto
Dustin Jeffrey 4 – pp – 05:29; Jean-Michel Daoust 3 – 13:13		Second period	14:25 – Jesse Joensuu 2
Jeff Taffe 3 – 19:05		Third period	No scoring
John Curry 20 saves / 22 shots		Goalie stats	Peter Mannino 14 saves / 18 shots

Wilkes-Barre/Scranton won series 4–1

- Note: First two games were played at Nassau Veterans Memorial Coliseum due to scheduling issues.

=== Western Conference ===
==== North Division ====
===== (N1) Manitoba Moose vs. (N4) Toronto Marlies =====
April 15	Manitoba Moose	2 – 3	OT	Toronto Marlies	MTS Centre	Recap
No Scoring		First period		No scoring
Guillaume Desbiens 1 – pp – 07:09; Raymond Sawada 1 – 16:28		Second period		06:34 – Kyle Rogers 1; 13:26 – Alex Foster 1
No scoring		Third period		No scoring
No scoring		First overtime period		05:28 – Bates Battaglia 1
Cory Schneider 25 saves / 28 shots		Goalie stats		Justin Pogge 37 saves/ 39 shots

April 17	Manitoba Moose	4 – 2	Toronto Marlies	MTS Centre	Recap
Jason Jaffray 1 – 12:12; Michael Grabner 1 – 12:27		First period	No scoring
Maxime Fortunus 1 – pp – 04:21		Second period	10:22 – Jiri Tlusty 1
Jason Jaffray – en/pp – 19:10		Third period	05:51 – Darryl Boyce 1
Cory Schneider 27 saves / 29 shots		Goalie stats	Justin Pogge 17 saves / 20 shots

April 19	Toronto Marlies	2 – 1	Manitoba Moose	Ricoh Coliseum	Recap
Ryan Hamilton 1 – pp – 06:17		First period	No Scoring
No scoring		Second period	16:48 – Alexandre Bolduc 1
Tim Stapleton 1 – 02:44		Third period	No scoring
Justin Pogge 30 saves / 31 shots		Goalie stats	Cory Schneider 26 saves / 28 shots

April 21	Toronto Marlies	1 – 5	Manitoba Moose	Ricoh Coliseum	Recap
No scoring		First period	No Scoring
Bates Battaglia 2 – pp – 09:48		Second period	03:18 – pp – Mark Fistric 1; 11:48 – pp – Maxime Fortunus 2; 19:31 – Jason Jaffray 3
No scoring		Third period	06:29 – Greg Rallo 1; 09:34 – pp – Mark Cullen 1
Justin Pogge 29 saves / 34 shots		Goalie stats	Cory Schneider 20 saves / 21 shots

April 23	Toronto Marlies	2 – 5	Manitoba Moose	Ricoh Coliseum	Recap
Anton Stralman 1 – 19:06		First period	06:05 – pp – Jason Jaffray 4
Darryl Boyce 2 – 17:57		Second period	18:43 – Jason Krog 1
No scoring		Third period	10:33 – Jason Jaffray 5; 13:00 – Jason Krog 2; 15:44 – Guillaume Desbiens 2
Justin Pogge 32 saves / 37 shots		Goalie stats	Cory Schneider 38 saves / 40 shots

April 25	Manitoba Moose	4 – 2	Toronto Marlies	MTS Centre	Recap
Greg Rallo 2 – 05:02		First period	No scoring
No scoring		Second period	05:52 – Tim Stapleton 2; 07:01 – Alex Foster 2
Matt Pope 1 – 01:45; Raymond Sawada 2 – 06:14; Guillaume Desbiens 3 – 15:46		Third period	No scoring
Cory Schneider 13 saves / 15 shots		Goalie stats	Adam Munro 29 saves / 33 shots

Manitoba won series 4–2

===== (N2) Hamilton Bulldogs vs. (N3) Grand Rapids Griffins =====
April 17	Hamilton Bulldogs	3 – 4	Grand Rapids Griffins	Copps Coliseum	Recap
Kyle Chipchura 1 – 05:59; Shawn Belle 1 – 09:47		First period	05:01 – Darren McCarty 1; 06:50 – Joakim Andersson 1
No scoring		Second period	No scoring
David Desharnais 1 – 18:01		Third period	00:19 – Justin Abdelkader 1; 13:06 – Darren Haydar 1
Marc Denis 31 saves / 35 shots		Goalie stats	Jimmy Howard 23 saves / 26 shots

April 18	Hamilton Bulldogs	1 – 3	Grand Rapids Griffins	Copps Coliseum	Recap
No Scoring		First period	No scoring
Ryan White 1 – 03:39		Second period	No scoring
No scoring		Third period	05:39 – pp – Ville Leino 1; 08:50 – Justin Abdelkader 2; 19:34 – en – Justin Abdelkader 3
Marc Denis 26 saves / 28 shots		Goalie stats	Jimmy Howard 22 saves / 23 shots

April 20	Grand Rapids Griffins	4 – 5	Hamilton Bulldogs	Van Andel Arena	Recap
Darren McCarty 2 – 19:35		First period	10:38 – pp – Yanick Lehoux 1
Brian Lashoff 1 – pp – 08:21		Second period	03:38 – Kyle Chipchura 2; 05:17 – Ben Maxwell 1
Ville Leino 2 – pp – 13:56; Justin Abdelkader 4 – 17:42		Third period	08:37 – Ryan Russell 1; 17:17 – Ryan White 2
Jimmy Howard 21 saves / 26 shots		Goalie stats	Marc Denis 27 saves / 31 shots

April 22	Grand Rapids Griffins	3 – 4	OT	Hamilton Bulldogs	Van Andel Arena	Recap
Aaron Gagnon 1 – 00:34		First period		No Scoring
Jamie Tardif 1 – 09:47		Second period		No scoring
Justin Abdelkader 5 – pp – 00:44		Third period		07:58 – sh – Kyle Chipchura 3; 09:41 – pp – Ben Maxwell 2; 11:27 – pp – Ben Maxwell 3
No scoring		First overtime period		02:42 – Ryan White 3
Jimmy Howard 20 saves / 24 shots		Goalie stats		Marc Denis 33 saves / 36 shots

April 24	Grand Rapids Griffins	4 – 2	Hamilton Bulldogs	Van Andel Arena	Recap
Tom Galvin 1 – pp – 08:00; Jakub Kindl 1 – 15:07		First period	17:51 – pp – Mike Glumac 1
Darren Haydar 2 – pp – 07:17		Second period	No scoring
Darren Haydar 3 – 07:17		Third period	No scoring
Jimmy Howard 14 saves / 15 shots		Goalie stats	Marc Denis 30 saves / 34 shots

April 26	Hamilton Bulldogs	1 – 4	Grand Rapids Griffins	Copps Coliseum	Recap
Greg Stewart 1 – 00:09		First period	05:25 – pp – Darren Haydar 4
No scoring		Second period	04:18 Justin Abdelkader 6
No scoring		Third period	13:45 – Cory Emmerton 1; 19:22 – en – Ville Leino 3
Marc Denis 14 saves / 17 shots		Goalie stats	Jimmy Howard 22 saves / 23 shots

Grand Rapids won series 4–2

==== West Division ====
===== (W1) Milwaukee Admirals vs. (W4) Rockford IceHogs =====
April 16	Milwaukee Admirals	3 – 1	Rockford IceHogs	Bradley Center	Recap
Patric Hornqvist 1 – 06:41		First period	09:14 – pp – Akim Aliu 1
No scoring		Second period	No scoring
Cal O'Reilly 1 – 17:08; Cal O'Reilly 2 – sh/en – 19:51		Third period	No scoring
Drew MacIntyre 31 saves / 32 shots		Goalie stats	Corey Crawford 21 saves / 23 shots

April 18	Milwaukee Admirals	3 – 1	Rockford IceHogs	Bradley Center	Recap
Cody Franson 1 – 18:49		First period	No scoring
Hugh Jessiman 1 – 17:48		Second period	07:52 – Evan Brophey 1
Patric Hornqvist 2 – 12:49		Third period	No scoring
Drew MacIntyre 24 saves / 25 shots		Goalie stats	Corey Crawford 29 saves / 32 shots

April 19	Rockford IceHogs	1 – 3	Milwaukee Admirals	Rockford MetroCentre	Recap
No scoring		First period	No Scoring
No scoring		Second period	02:07 – pp – Andreas Thuresson 1; 06:36 – Triston Grant 1
Tyler Mosienko 1 – pp – 17:39		Third period	03:08 – pp – Ryan Jones 1
Antti Niemi 27 saves / 30 shots		Goalie stats	Drew MacIntyre 25 saves / 26 shots

April 21	Rockford IceHogs	1 – 4	Milwaukee Admirals	Rockford MetroCentre	Recap
No scoring		First period	15:03 – Jed Ortmeyer 1
Pascal Pelletier 1 – pp – 16:21		Second period	18:38 – Mike Santorelli 1
No scoring		Third period	07:02 – Mike Santorelli 2; 15:22 – Mike Santorelli 3
Antti Niemi 34 saves / 38 shots		Goalie stats	Drew MacIntyre 25 saves / 26 shots

Milwaukee won series 4–0

===== (W2) Peoria Rivermen vs. (W3) Houston Aeros =====
April 15	Peoria Rivermen	6 – 4	Houston Aeros	Carver Arena	Recap
Yan Stastny 1 - 07:36; Steve Regier 1 - pp - 09:48		First period	14:03 – pp – Maxim Noreau 1
Cam Paddock 1 - 09:05; Yan Stastny 2 - 09:37		Second period	No scoring
Jori Lehtera 1 – 02:36; Carl Corazzini 1 – pp – 07:12		Third period	00:25 – pp – Corey Locke 1; 01:22 – Krys Kolanos 1; 19:16 – Robbie Earl 1
Manny Legace 29 saves / 33 shots		Goalie stats	Anton Khudobin 25 saves / 31 shots

April 17	Peoria Rivermen	0 – 2	Houston Aeros	Carver Arena	Recap
No Scoring		First period	19:51 – Peter Olvecky 1
No scoring		Second period	No scoring
No scoring		Third period	08:45 – Danny Irmen 1
Manny Legace 26 saves / 28 shots		Goalie stats	Anton Khudobin 30 saves / 30 shots

April 18	Houston Aeros	2 – 1	Peoria Rivermen	Toyota Center	Recap
No scoring		First period	No Scoring
Corey Locke 2 – pp 09:13		Second period	No scoring
Corey Locke 3 – pp – 10:02		Third period	03:10 – Chris Porter 1
Anton Khudobin 23 saves / 24 shots		Goalie stats	Manny Legace 22 saves / 24 shots

April 20	Houston Aeros	3 – 4	Peoria Rivermen	Toyota Center	Recap
No scoring		First period	09:11 – Cam Paddock 2
Tony Hrkac 1 – 05:43; Tomas Mojzis 1 – pp – 07:29		Second period	17:29 – pp – Steve Wagner 1; 18:13 – pp – Nicholas Drazenovic 1
Jesse Schultz 1 – pp – 15:21		Third period	05:46 – Trent Whitfield 1
Anton Khudobin 14 saves / 18 shots Matt Climie 3 saves / 3 shots		Goalie stats	Manny Legace 24 saves / 27 shots

April 22	Houston Aeros	3 – 2	OT	Peoria Rivermen	Toyota Center	Recap
No scoring		First period		No Scoring
No scoring		Second period		17:18 – Jeff Cowan 1
Matt Beaudoin 1 – pp – 15:43; Robbie Earl 2 – 17:13		Third period		12:48 – Steve Regier 2
Maxim Noreau 2 – pp – 12:14		First overtime period		No scoring
Anton Khudobin 30 saves / 32 shots		Goalie stats		Manny Legace 16 saves / 19 shots

April 25	Peoria Rivermen	2 – 1	Houston Aeros	Carver Arena	Recap
No Scoring		First period	No scoring
Trent Whitfield 2 – 18:37		Second period	11:36 – pp – Matt Beaudoin 2
Jonathon Filewich 1 – 04:43		Third period	No scoring
Manny Legace 28 saves / 29 shots		Goalie stats	Anton Khudobin 22 saves / 24 shots

April 27	Peoria Rivermen	2 – 5	Houston Aeros	Carver Arena	Recap
No Scoring		First period	01:39 – pp – Krys Kolanos 2; 11:01 – sh – Marco Rosa 1
Jonathon Filewich 2 – 07:33; Carl Corazzini – 15:16		Second period	No scoring
		Third period	09:41 – Maxim Noreau 3; 19:36 – en – Corey Locke 4; 19:57 – en – Mitch Love 1
Manny Legace		Goalie stats	Anton Khudobin

Houston won series 4–3

== Division Finals ==
=== Eastern Conference ===
==== Atlantic Division ====
===== (A2) Providence Bruins vs. (A4) Worcester Sharks =====
April 28	Providence Bruins	3 – 2	OT	Worcester Sharks	Dunkin' Donuts Center	Recap
Martin St. Pierre 2 – 01:06		First period		No scoring
Brad Marchand 3 – pp – 05:55		Second period		12:55 – pp – Jamie McGinn 1
No scoring		Third period		14:39 – Jamie McGinn 2
Jeremy Reich 2 – 6:19		First overtime period		No scoring
Tuuka Rask 35 saves / 37 shots		Goalie stats		Thomas Greiss 24 saves / 27 shots

May 6	Worcester Sharks	2 – 4	Providence Bruins	DCU Center	Recap
No scoring		First period	19:03 – Martin St. Pierre 3
Riley Armstrong 1 – 03:42		Second period	7:36 – pp – Johnny Boychuk 3
Dan DaSilva 3 – 11:31		Third period	05:15 – Kirk MacDonald 2; 19:20 – en – Wacey Rabbit 1
Thomas Greiss 29 saves / 32 shots		Goalie stats	Tuuka Rask 22 saves / 24 shots

May 8	Providence Bruins	3 – 5	Worcester Sharks	Dunkin' Donuts Center	Recap
No Scoring		First period	14:10 – pp – Patrick Traverse 3; 19:01 – T. J. Fox 3
Jeff Penner 1 – 00:10; Jeff Penner – pp – 07:55		Second period	04:40 – Andrew Desjardins 3
Mikko Lehtonen 1 – pp – 19:05		Third period	11:39 – Jamie McGinn 3; 19:26 – en – Riley Armstrong 2
Tuuka Rask 26 saves / 30 shots		Goalie stats	Thomas Greiss 25 saves / 28 shots

May 9	Worcester Sharks	1 – 0	Providence Bruins	DCU Center	Recap
Tom Cavanaugh 3- 04:41		First period	No Scoring
No scoring		Second period	No scoring
No scoring		Third period	No scoring
Thomas Greiss 26 saves/ 26 shots		Goalie stats	Tuuka Rask 26 saves / 27 shots

May 11	Providence Bruins	4 – 3	Worcester Sharks	Dunkin' Donuts Center	Recap
No Scoring		First period	19:22 – pp – Patrick Traverse 4
Martin St. Pierre 4 – 03:07; Brad Marchand 4 – pp – 10:55; Jeremy Reich 3 14:08		Second period	No scoring
Levi Nelson 1 – 10:42		Third period	10:28 – pp – Jamie McGinn 4; 17:48 – Riley Armstrong 3
Tuuka Rask 30 saves / 33 shots		Goalie stats	Thomas Greiss 30 saves / 34 shots

May 13	Worcester Sharks	1 – 5	Providence Bruins	DCU Center	Recap
No scoring		First period	04:59 – pp – Brad Marchand 5; 10:05 – Jamie Arniel 1
Andrew Desjardins 4 – sh – 19:48		Second period	05:32 – Kirk MacDonald 3; 13:29 – Jordan Knackstedt 2; 14:10 – pp – Martin St. Pierre 5
No scoring		Third period	No scoring
Thomas Greiss 25 saves / 30 shots		Goalie stats	Tuuka Rask 34 saves / 35 shots Kevin Nastiuk 0 saves / 0 shots

Providence won series 4–2

==== East Division ====
===== (E1) Hershey Bears vs. (E3) Wilkes-Barre/Scranton Penguins =====
May 2	Hershey Bears	5 – 3	Wilkes-Barre/Scranton Penguins	GIANT Center	Recap
Staffan Kronwall 3 – pp – 09:38; Chris Bourque 1 – 11:13		First period	No scoring
Andrew Gordon 2 – pp – 19:43		Second period	14:31 – Jean-Michel Daoust 4; 16:55 – pp – Nick Johnson 1
Kyle Wilson 2 – 01:38; Alexandre Giroux 3 – 09:21		Third period	07:45 – pp – Nick Johnson 2
Michal Neuvirth 35 saves / 38 shots		Goalie stats	John Curry 18 saves / 23 shots

May 3	Hershey Bears	3 – 1	Wilkes-Barre/Scranton Penguins	GIANT Center	Recap
Oskar Osala 2 – 10:38; John Carlson 1 – 13:54; Graham Mink 2 – 17:51		First period	No scoring
No scoring		Second period	No scoring
No scoring		Third period	18:04 – Alex Goligoski 1
Michal Neuvirth 24 saves / 25 shots		Goalie stats	John Curry 6 saves / 9 shots Adam Berkhoel 20 shots / 20 saves

May 6	Wilkes-Barre/Scranton Penguins	3 – 2	OT	Hershey Bears	Wachovia Arena at Casey Plaza	Recap
No scoring		First period		10:45 – pp – Graham Mink 3
Jeff Taffe – 4 – 17:24		Second period		No scoring
Bill Thomas – pp – 16:16		Third period		03:20 – pp – Alexandre Giroux
Mark Letestu – 04:48		First overtime period		No scoring
Adam Berkhoel 23 saves / 25 shots		Goalie stats		Michal Neuvirth 40 saves / 43 shots

May 8	Wilkes-Barre/Scranton Penguins	6 – 3	Hershey Bears	Wachovia Arena at Casey Plaza	Recap
Nick Johnson 3 – 05:29; Dustin Jeffrey 5 – 11:08; Jean-Michel Daoust 5 – pp – 17:20		First period	No Scoring
Luca Caputi 2 – pp – 11:37		Second period	18:58 – Grant McNeill 1
Mark Letestu 2 – 15:21; Janne Pesonen 1 – en – 19:06		Third period	04:47 – Steve Pinizzotto 2; 17:55 – pp – Keith Aucoin 1
Adam Berkhoel 23 saves / 26 shots		Goalie stats	Michal Neuvirth 24 saves / 29 shots

May 9	Wilkes-Barre/Scranton Penguins	4 – 1	Hershey Bears	Wachovia Arena at Casey Plaza	Recap
Chris Minard 6 – pp – 08:55; Luca Caputi 3 – pp – 13:43		First period	No Scoring
Nick Johnson 4 – pp 15:08		Second period	05:19 – Darren Reid 1
Jeff Taffe 5 – sh/en 19:05		Third period	No scoring
Adam Berkhoel 39 saves / 40 shots		Goalie stats	Michal Neuvirth 26 saves / 29 shots

May 10	Hershey Bears	3 – 0	Wilkes-Barre/Scranton Penguins	GIANT Center	Recap
Andrew Gordon 3 – 11:35		First period	No scoring
Darren Reid 2 – 00:22; Alexandre Giroux 5 – pp – 03:11		Second period	No scoring
No scoring		Third period	No scoring
Michal Neuvirth 30 saves / 30 shots		Goalie stats	Adam Berkhoel 40 saves / 43 shots

May 12	Hershey Bears	3 – 0	Wilkes-Barre/Scranton Penguins	GIANT Center	Recap
Keith Aucoin 2 – 00:50		First period	No scoring
Chris Bourque 2- pp – 04:54		Second period	No scoring
Steve Pinizzotto 3 – 10:49		Third period	No scoring
Michal Neuvirth 24 saves / 24 shots		Goalie stats	Adam Berkhoel 32 saves / 35 shots

Hershey won series 4–3

=== Western Conference ===
==== North Division ====
===== (N1) Manitoba Moose vs. (N3) Grand Rapids Griffins =====
May 1	Manitoba Moose	2 – 1	Grand Rapids Griffins	MTS Centre	Recap
No Scoring		First period	18:04 – Francis Pare 1
No scoring		Second period	No scoring
Alexandre Bolduc 2 – pp – 01:16; Mike Keane 1 – 02:55		Third period	No scoring
Cory Schneider 21 saves / 22 shots		Goalie stats	Jimmy Howard 32 saves / 34 shots

May 2	Manitoba Moose	2 – 1	Grand Rapids Griffins	MTS Centre	Recap
Alexandre Bolduc 3 – sh – 04:34		First period	06:31 – pp – Darren McCarty 3
No scoring		Second period	No scoring
Jason Krog 3 – 10:10		Third period	No scoring
Cory Schneider 28 saves / 29 shots		Goalie stats	Jimmy Howard 20 saves / 22 shots

May 4	Grand Rapids Griffins	1 – 3	Manitoba Moose	Van Andel Arena	Recap
No scoring		First period	08:06 – Matt Pope 2; 19:28 – Alexandre Bolduc 4
Francis Pare 2 – 12:29		Second period	No scoring
No scoring		Third period	19:36 – en – Jason Jaffray 6
Jimmy Howard 25 saves / 27 shots		Goalie stats	Cory Schneider 22 saves / 23 shots

May 6	Grand Rapids Griffins	2 – 3	Manitoba Moose	Van Andel Arena	Recap
Jakub Kindl 2 – sh – 14:33		First period	15:48 – pp – Jason Krog 2
No scoring		Second period	01:19 – Guillaume Desbiens 4; 06:15 – pp – Mark Cullen 2
Jamie Tardif 2 – 13:00		Third period	No scoring
Jimmy Howard 17 saves / 20 shots		Goalie stats	Cory Schneider 30 saves / 32 shots

Manitoba won series 4–0

==== West Division ====
===== (W1) Milwaukee Admirals vs. (W3) Houston Aeros =====
April 30	Milwaukee Admirals	1 – 2	Houston Aeros	Bradley Center	Recap
No scoring		First period	02:58 – pp – Tomas Mojzis 2
No scoring		Second period	16:36 – Krys Kolanos 3
Andreas Thuresson 2 – 17:13		Third period	No scoring
Drew MacIntyre 22 saves / 24 shots		Goalie stats	Anton Khudobin 27 saves / 28 shots

May 2	Milwaukee Admirals	4 – 1	Houston Aeros	Bradley Center	Recap
Cody Franson 2 – 02:57		First period	No scoring
Ryan Jones 2 – pp – 16:25		Second period	11:38 – Robbie Earl 3
Mike Santorelli 4 – 02:37; Ryan Jones 3 – 11:01		Third period	No scoring
Drew MacIntyre 18 saves / 19 shots		Goalie stats	Anton Khudobin 25 saves / 29 shots Matt Climie 6 saves / 6 shots

May 5	Houston Aeros	3 – 1	Milwaukee Admirals	Toyota Center	Recap
Krys Kolanos 4 – 05:41		First period	No scoring
No scoring		Second period	18:25 – Ryan Jones 4
Matt Beaudoin 3 – pp – 05:14; Corey Locke 5- 18:09		Third period	No scoring
Anton Khudobin 27 saves / 28 shots		Goalie stats	Drew MacIntyre 13 saves / 16 shots

May 7	Houston Aeros	2 – 0	Milwaukee Admirals	Toyota Center	Recap
Benoit Pouliot 1 – pp – 16:56		First period	No scoring
No scoring		Second period	No scoring
Krys Kolanos 5 – en – 19:58		Third period	No scoring
Anton Khudobin 27 saves / 27 shots		Goalie stats	Drew MacIntyre 12 saves / 13 shots

May 9	Houston Aeros	3 – 4	Milwaukee Admirals	Toyota Center	Recap
Corey Locke 6 – pp – 09:13		First period	10:09 – Bryan Smolinski 1; 18:28 – Bryan Smolinski 2
No scoring		Second period	05:03 – Andreas Thuresson 3; 10:24 Kelsey Wilson 1
Corey Locke 7 – pp – 8:52; Robbie Earl 4 – pp – 18:10		Third period	No scoring
Anton Khudobin 16 saves / 20 shots		Goalie stats	Drew MacIntyre 27 saves / 30 shots

May 11	Milwaukee Admirals	7 – 0	Houston Aeros	Bradley Center	Recap
Hugh Jessiman 2 – 07:34; Robert Dietrich 1 – 12:52; Patric Hornqvist 3 – 18:10		First period	No scoring
Bryan Smolinski 3 – pp – 08:23; Mike Santorelli 5 – 10:42; Cody Franson 3 – 14:44		Second period	No scoring
Ryan Maki 1 – 17:52		Third period	No scoring
Drew MacIntyre 21 saves / 21 shots		Goalie stats	Anton Khudobin 6 saves / 8 shots Nolan Schaefer 18 saves / 23 shots

May 13	Milwaukee Admirals	2 – 5	Houston Aeros	Bradley Center	Recap
Patric Hornqvist 4 – pp – 14:12		First period	3:34 – Corey Locke 8; 4:23 – Krys Kolanos 6
Mike Santorelli 6 – 18:58		Second period	14:21 – pp – Clayton Stoner 1
No scoring		Third period	5:30 – Bryan Lundbohm 1; 18:09 – en – Corey Locke 9
Drew MacIntyre 25 saves / 29 shots		Goalie stats	Anton Khudobin 28 saves / 30 shots

Houston won series 4–3

== Conference Finals ==
=== Eastern Conference ===
==== (E1) Hershey Bears vs. (A2) Providence Bruins ====
May 16	Hershey Bears	2 – 3	Providence Bruins	GIANT Center	Recap
No scoring		First period	08:03 – pp -Jeff Penner 3; 16:19 – pp – Jordan Knackstedt 3
Oskar Osala 3 – 3:03; Oskar Osala 4 – 14:41		Second period	08:28 – Matt Marquardt 1
No scoring		Third period	No scoring
Michal Neuvirth 25 saves / 28 shots		Goalie stats	Tuukka Rask 30 saves / 32 shots

May 17	Hershey Bears	2 – 1	Providence Bruins	GIANT Center	Recap
No scoring		First period	No scoring
No scoring		Second period	No scoring
Andrew Joudrey 1 – 3:21; Alexandre Giroux 6 – pp – 6:01		Third period	19:24 – pp – Brad Marchand
Michal Neuvirth 25 saves / 26 shots		Goalie stats	Tuukka Rask 37 saves / 39 shots

May 22	Providence Bruins	4 – 6	Hershey Bears	Dunkin' Donuts Center	Recap
Zach Hamill 1 – 01:56; Jeff Penner 4 – pp – 15:32		First period	No scoring
Peter Schaefer 2 – pp – 03:01		Second period	03:26 – Alexandre Giroux 7; 09:05 – Chris Bourque 3
Jeff Penner 5 – pp – 00:38		Third period	05:32 – Andrew Gordon 4; 06:52 – Alexandre Giroux 8; 13:58 – Graham Mink 4; 19:25 – pp – Bryan Helmer 2
Tuukka Rask 26 saves / 32 shots		Goalie stats	Michal Neuvirth 24 saves / 28 shots

May 24	Providence Bruins	2 – 3	OT	Hershey Bears	Dunkin' Donuts Center	Recap
Peter Schaefer 3 – 05:32; Jeff Penner 6 – pp – 08:12		First period		No scoring
No scoring		Second period		07:31 – pp – Bryan Helmer 3
No scoring		Third period		13:12 – Keith Aucoin 3
No scoring		First overtime period		15:10 – Graham Mink 5
Tuukka Rask 40 saves / 43 shots		Goalie stats		Michal Neuvirth 25 saves / 27 shots

May 25	Providence Bruins	2 – 5	Hershey Bears	Dunkin' Donuts Center	Recap
No scoring		First period	No scoring
Brad Marchand 7 – pp – 04:45		Second period	02:17 – pp – Andrew Gordon 5; 16:20 – pp – Alexandre Giroux 9
Mikko Lehtonen 2 – 01:57		Third period	06:46 – sh – Chris Bourque 4; 10:19 – Darren Reid 3; 19:03 – en – Quintin Laing 1
Tuukka Rask 33 saves / 37 shots		Goalie stats	Michal Neuvirth 27 saves / 29 shots

Hershey wins series 4–1

=== Western Conference ===
==== (N1) Manitoba Moose vs. (W3) Houston Aeros ====
May 15	Manitoba Moose	2 – 1	Houston Aeros	MTS Centre	Recap
Dusty Collins 1 – 14:34		First period	No scoring
No scoring		Second period	No scoring
Mario Bliznak 1 – 11:58		Third period	09:50 – pp – Matt Beaudoin 4
Cory Schneider 31 saves / 32 shots		Goalie stats	Anton Khudobin 16 saves / 18 shots

May 16	Manitoba Moose	5 – 2	Houston Aeros	MTS Centre	Recap
Jason Krog 5 – 11:00; Michael Grabner 2 – 14:07; Raymond Sawada 3 – pp – 17:49		First period	No scoring
Cody Hodgson 1 – 01:55; Michael Grabner 3 – pp – 04:37		Second period	07:25 – J. P. Testwuide; 19:50 – Marco Rosa
No scoring		Third period	No scoring
Cory Schneider 28 saves / 30 shots		Goalie stats	Anton Khudobin 9 saves / 12 shots Nolan Schaefer 18 saves / 20 shots

May 18	Houston Aeros	3 – 4	Manitoba Moose	Toyota Center	Recap
No scoring		First period	13:47 – Mike Keane 2
Matt Beaudoin 5 – pp – 12:29		Second period	12:29 – pp – Alexandre Bolduc 5; 14:08 – Michael Grabner 4
Corey Locke 10 – 01:11; Danny Irmen 2 – sh – 06:30		Third period	16:11 – Michael Grabner 5
Nolan Schaefer 15 saves / 19 shots		Goalie stats	Cory Schneider 21 saves / 24 shots

May 20	Houston Aeros	5 – 4	OT	Manitoba Moose	Toyota Center	Recap
Corey Locke 11 – 01:26		First period		07:10 – Mike Keane 3; 09:06 – sh – Mike Keane 4
Robbie Earl 5 – 13:58		Second period		No scoring
Matt Beaudoin 6 – 13:34; Tony Hrkac 2 – 14:29		Third period		00:25 – Jason Krog 6; 17:21 – Mario Bliznak 2
Matt Beaudoin 7 – 02:01		First overtime period		No scoring
Anton Khudobin 18 saves / 22 shots Nolan Schaefer 0 saves / 0 shots		Goalie stats		Cory Schneider 25 saves / 30 shots

May 22	Houston Aeros	4 – 3	2OT	Manitoba Moose	Toyota Center	Recap
Maxim Noreau 2 – pp – 02:56; Tony Hrkac 3 – 04:22		First period		No scoring
Matt Beaudoin 8 – 17:34		Second period		No scoring
No scoring		Third period		02:29 – pp – Michael Grabner 6; 19:39 – pp – Jason Krog 7; 19:58 – Mark Cullen 3
Tony Hrkac 4 – 04:19		Second overtime period		No scoring
Matt Climie 45 saves / 48 shots		Goalie stats		Cory Schneider 16 saves / 19 shots Curtis Sanford 22 saves / 23 shots

May 25	Manitoba Moose	3 – 1	Houston Aeros	MTS Centre	Recap
Matt Pope 3 – 12:48		First period	12:52 – pp – Corey Locke 12
No scoring		Second period	No scoring
Michael Grabner 7 – pp – 09:46; Mark Fistric 2 – 12:07		Third period	No scoring
Cory Schneider 16 saves / 17 shots		Goalie stats	Matt Climie 33 saves / 36 shots

Manitoba wins series 4–2

== Calder Cup Finals ==
=== (N1) Manitoba Moose vs. (E1) Hershey Bears ===
May 30	Manitoba Moose	4 – 5	OT	Hershey Bears	MTS Centre	Recap
Mark Cullen 4 – pp – 07:35; Michael Grabner 8 – 13:18		First period		08:31 – sh – Alexandre Giroux 10
Michael Grabner 9 – 06:12		Second period		No scoring
Maxime Fortunus 3 -pp – 18:34		Third period		02:34 – Oskar Osala 5; 11:01 – pp – Alexandre Giroux 11; 15:24 – Oskar Osala 6
No scoring		First overtime period		13:33 – pp – Alexandre Giroux 12
Cory Schneider 30 saves / 35 shots		Goalie stats		Michal Neuvirth 26 saves / 30 shots

June 2	Manitoba Moose	3 – 1	Hershey Bears	MTS Centre	Recap
No scoring		First period	12:31 – Alexandre Giroux 13
Jason Jaffray 7 – pp – 07:59		Second period	No scoring
Jason Jaffray 8 – 19:13; Jason Jaffray 9 – pp/en – 19:50		Third period	No scoring
Cory Schneider 27 saves / 28 shots		Goalie stats	Michal Neuvirth 27 saves / 29 shots

June 6	Hershey Bears	3 – 0	Manitoba Moose	GIANT Center	Recap
06:22 – pp – Graham Mink 6		First period	No scoring
09:38 – pp – Alexandre Giroux 14		Second period	No scoring
19:16 – en/sh – Quintin Laing		Third period	No scoring
Michal Neuvirth 28 saves / 28 shots		Goalie stats	Cory Schneider 21 saves / 23 shots

June 7	Hershey Bears	2 – 1	Manitoba Moose	GIANT Center	Recap
No scoring		First period	11:37 – Raymond Sawada 4
Kyle Wilson 3 – 05:11		Second period	No scoring
Keith Aucoin 4 – pp – 07:17		Third period	No scoring
Michal Neuvirth 30 saves / 31 shots		Goalie stats	Cory Schneider 31 saves / 33 shots

June 9	Hershey Bears	2 – 3	Manitoba Moose	GIANT Center	Recap
No scoring		First period	No scoring
No scoring		Second period	17:00 – Michael Grabner 10; 18:07 – Cody Hodgson 2
Graham Mink 7 – 04:17; John Carlson 2 – 19:29		Third period	18:39 – en – Jason Krog 8
Michal Neuvirth 23 saves / 25 shots		Goalie stats	Cory Schneider 31 saves / 33 shots

June 12	Manitoba Moose	1 – 4	Hershey Bears	MTS Centre	Recap
No scoring		First period	03:56 – Andrew Gordon 6; 06:10 – Chris Bourque 5; 11:16 Alexandre Giroux 15
Mario Bliznak 3 – 11:03		Second period	No scoring
No scoring		Third period	19:39 – en – Keith Aucoin
Cory Schneider 26 saves / 29 shots		Goalie stats	Michal Neuvirth 24 saves / 25 shots

Hershey wins series 4–2

== See also ==
- 2008–09 AHL season
- List of AHL seasons

Preceded by 2008 Calder Cup playoffs	Calder Cup playoffs 2009	Succeeded by 2010 Calder Cup playoffs
