= Kirk MacDonald =

Kirk MacDonald may refer to:

- Kirk MacDonald (ice hockey) (born 1983), Canadian ice hockey player
- Kirk MacDonald (politician), member of the Legislative Assembly of New Brunswick
- Kirk MacDonald (musician), jazz musician
