= Mathieu Perreault =

Canadian ice hockey player (born 1988)

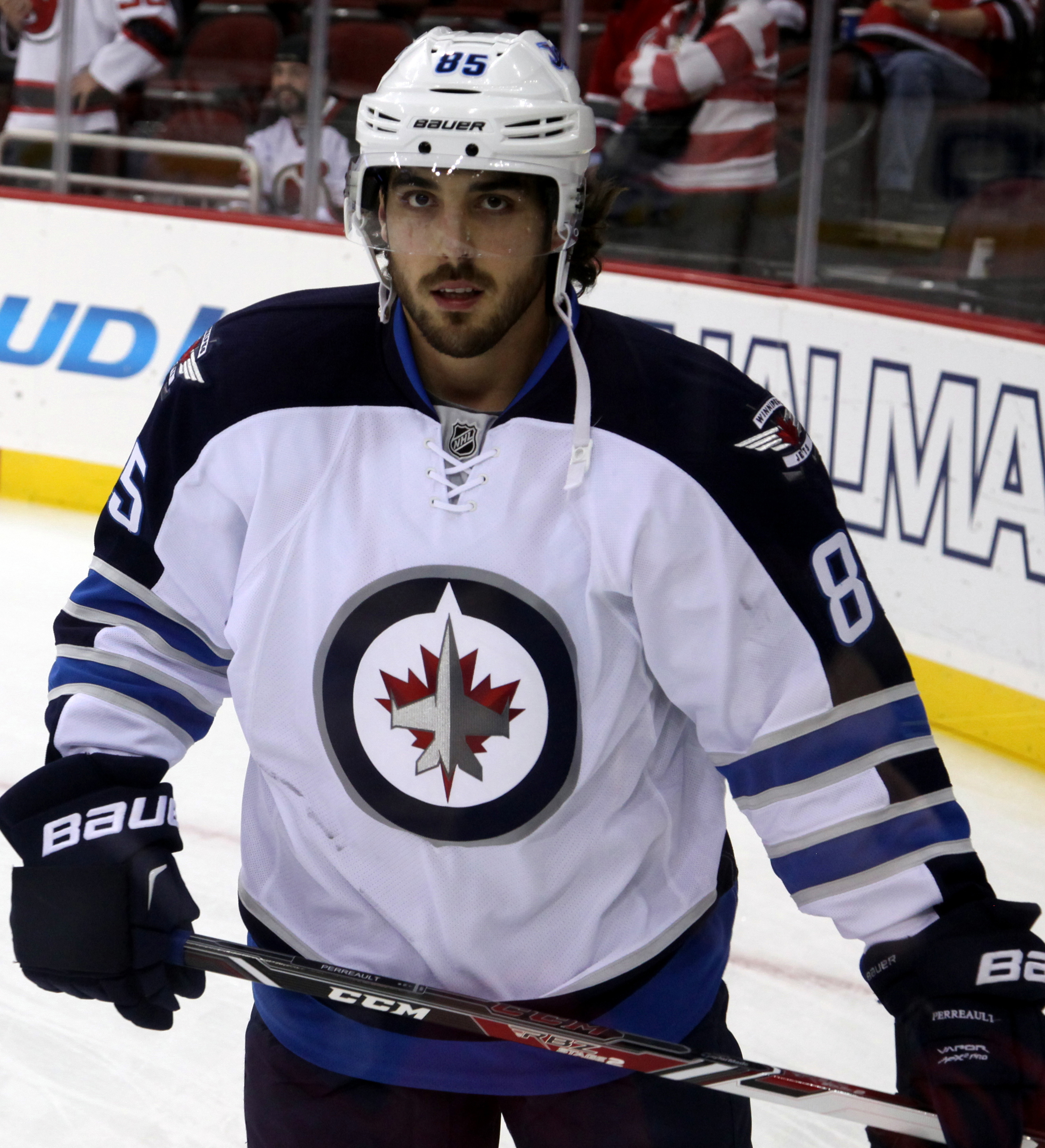
- Perreault with the Winnipeg Jets in 2014
- Born: January 5, 1988 (age 38) Drummondville, Quebec, Canada
- Height: 5 ft 10 in (178 cm)
- Weight: 185 lb (84 kg; 13 st 3 lb)
- Position: Centre / Left wing
- Shot: Left
- Played for: Washington Capitals; HIFK; Anaheim Ducks; Winnipeg Jets; Montreal Canadiens
- NHL draft: 177th overall, 2006; Washington Capitals
- Playing career: 2008–2022

Mathieu Perreault (born January 5, 1988) is a Canadian former professional ice hockey player. He was a winger for the Washington Capitals, Anaheim Ducks, Winnipeg Jets and Montreal Canadiens in the National Hockey League (NHL), and for HIFK of the SM-liiga (SM-l).

Prior to turning professional, Perreault played three seasons of major junior hockey with the Acadie–Bathurst Titan in the Quebec Major Junior Hockey League (QMJHL). In his final year in the QMJHL, he won the Jean Béliveau Trophy as the league's top point-producer and was named to the Second-Team All-Star. Perreault then began his professional career during the 2007–08 season, playing with the Capitals' American Hockey League affiliate, the Hershey Bears, and helping them clinch the 2009 Calder Cup.

Perreault remained with the Capitals organization until the 2013–14 season when he was traded to the Anaheim Ducks. During his one season with the team, Perreault set new career highs in goals, assists, and points. Following the season, he joined the Winnipeg Jets as a free agent. While with the Jets, Perreault became one of three players drafted after the second round in 2006 to reach 600 games.

== Early life ==
Perreault was born on January 5, 1988, in Drummondville, Quebec. He started skating at age 4 with his older brother, and his father took them to outdoor rinks to practice. His mother's brother Daniel Marois was a National Hockey League (NHL) player for the Toronto Maple Leafs, Boston Bruins, and New York Islanders. His cousin, Nick Marois, also played for the Chicoutimi Saguenéens in the Quebec Major Junior Hockey League (QMJHL). Perreault said while growing up he was inspired by Daniel Brière due to their similar height.

== Playing career ==
=== Amateur ===
Perreault played the entirety of his minor ice hockey career in Drummondville, Quebec. His father coached him while he was playing at the Atom level and he won the Rock Forest novice tournament three years in a row. While playing midget hockey, he was called up to play in the International Midget hockey tournament for Cantonniers de Magog after a player suffered an injury. As a youth, Perreault played in the 2002 Quebec International Pee-Wee Hockey Tournament with the Drummondville Voltigeurs minor ice hockey team.

Perreault concluded his minor ice hockey career after being drafted second overall by the Acadie–Bathurst Titan in the 2005 QMJHL entry draft. He played his first major junior season in 2005–06, recording 18 goals and 34 assists while playing on the Titan's second line. As a result of his play, Perreault was the recipient of a 2006 RDS mid-season rookie excellence award which included an education bursary of $1,000. As the Titan qualified for the 2006 QMJHL playoffs, Perreault scored 10 goals with 11 assists in 17 games before being eliminated by the Quebec Remparts. After his rookie season, Perreault was drafted in the sixth round, 177th overall, in the 2006 NHL entry draft by the Washington Capitals.

Perreault returned to the Titan for his sophomore season and recorded a new career-high 41 goals and 78 assists in 67 games. As a result of his play, he was selected to try-out for the Canadian men's national junior ice hockey team but failed to qualify. Upon returning to the QMJHL, he was selected for the QMJHL First-Team All-Star and received the Michel Brière Memorial Trophy as League MVP after finishing third in the overall scoring. As the Titans qualified for the 2007 QMJHL playoffs where Perreault recorded six goals and eight assists before the team was eliminated in their second-round series.

Although he had yet to sign a contract with the Capitals, Perreault was invited to attend their 2007 training camp prior to their 2007–08 season. In his final year in the QMJHL, he won the Jean Béliveau Trophy as the league's top point-producer and was named to the league Second-Team All-Star. On March 28, 2008, Perreault signed an entry-level contract with the Washington Capitals for the following season and was re-assigned to their American Hockey League (AHL) affiliate, the Hershey Bears.

=== Professional ===
==== Washington Capitals ====
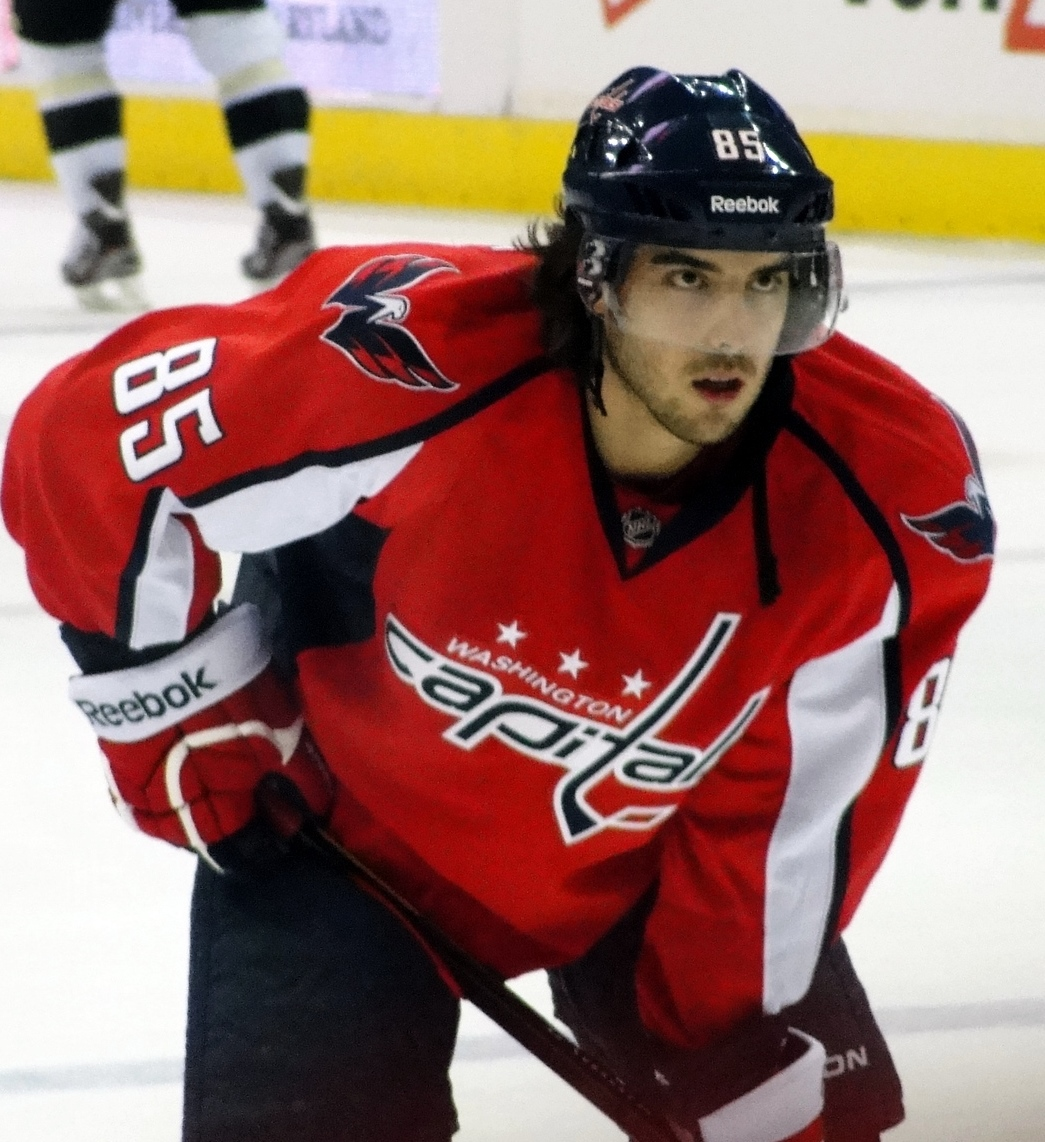
Perreault with the Capitals in January 2012

Perreault remained with the Bears for the 2008–09 season, helping them win the Calder Cup. While playing on a line with Oskar Osala and Francois Bouchard, he recorded his first career AHL goal in his first regular-season game on October 8, 2008. He finished the season with 11 goals and 39 assists in 77 games, including five power play goals. The following season, Perreault split his time between the AHL and NHL, playing 56 games for the Bears and 21 for the Capitals. Although he was re-assigned to the AHL to begin the season, he was recalled from the Bears as a result of several injuries to the Capitals lineup. At the time of his recall, Perreault had recorded one goal and six assists in 11 games. He made his NHL debut on November 4, 2009, against the New Jersey Devils and recorded two assists in the 3–2 loss. In the third game of his call up, Perreault scored his first NHL goal, which came in the third period against Scott Clemmensen of the Florida Panthers at the Verizon Center. The goal proved to be the spark that the Capitals needed after being down 3–2; the team ended up winning 7–4.

Perreault once-again split his time during the 2010–11 season between the AHL and NHL, playing 34 games for the Bears and 35 for the Capitals. In a game against the Bridgeport Sound Tigers, Perreault recorded a four-goal game in an eventual 9–2 win. While playing on a line with Chris Bourque and Steve Pinizzotto, he recorded two goals in the first period and completed his hat trick with a penalty shot in the second period. His final goal also came during the second period. On July 13, 2011, Perreault signed a one-year, two-way contract extension with the Capitals.

After two seasons bouncing back and forth between the AHL and NHL, Perreault made the Capitals' opening night roster out of training camp for the first time in the 2011–12 season. He began the season on the fourth line but was quickly moved to the first as injuries and illness depleted Washington’s depth. During his first game on the first line centering Alex Ovechkin and Alexander Semin, he recorded two assists. Two days later, in his 86th NHL game, Perreault recorded his first NHL hat trick on January 24, 2012, against Tuukka Rask of the Boston Bruins in Washington's 5–3 victory.

Due to the 2012–13 NHL lockout, Perreault began the season with HIFK in the Liiga, recording seven points in seven games. During his time with HIFK, he was on the first power-play unit and played over 20 minutes per game. Upon returning to the NHL, he played an average of 4:28. After complaining about his ice time during the first two games of the season, his time increased along with penalty minutes. As a result, he served as a healthy scratch for five straight games before returning to the lineup against the Florida Panthers.

==== Anaheim Ducks ====
Perreault was traded from the Capitals to the Anaheim Ducks on September 29, 2013, in exchange for winger John Mitchell and a fourth-round pick in the 2014 NHL entry draft. Ducks head coach Bruce Boudreau had pushed for Perreault to join the team because he liked him as a player and wanted to give him a chance. In his first 16 games with the Ducks, he recorded five goals and nine assists. While discussing his scoring prowess, Perreault praised the Ducks for giving him a "fresh start and a new opportunity to play under a familiar coach."

Near the conclusion of the season, Perreault suffered an upper-body injury during a 1–0 win over the St. Louis Blues and was listed as day-to-day. He returned to the lineup for the 2014 Stanley Cup playoffs and helped the team win their series against the Dallas Stars in six games. Although he was forced to sit out for Game 6 due to a lower-body injury, he had recorded two goals and three assists in the series with 13 penalty minutes. In his one season with the Ducks, he registered 43 points in 69 games played, but Anaheim opted not to sign Perreault following the expiry of his contract.

==== Winnipeg Jets ====
On July 1, 2014, Perreault signed a three-year, $9 million contract with the Winnipeg Jets and made their opening night roster. In the first year of his contract, Perreault scored four goals in an 8–2 Winnipeg win over the Florida Panthers on January 13, 2015. He subsequently became the first NHL player to score four goals in a single game for the Jets/Thrashers franchise since Ilya Kovalchuk in 2005. Following this game, Perreault suffered an upper-body injury during a 4–2 win over the Chicago Blackhawks and was expected to possibly miss the remainder of the regular-season. At the time of his injury, he sat fifth in team scoring with 18 goals for 36 points in 56 games. Perreault returned to the Jets' lineup during Game 2 of the 2015 Stanley Cup playoffs against his former team, the Anaheim Ducks. He recorded one assist in his return although the Jets would lose 2–1. The following season, Perreault recorded nine goals and 41 points in 71 games before suffering a concussion during a game against the Anaheim Ducks. With one year remaining on his contract, Perreault signed a four-year, $16.5 million contract extension to remain with the Jets. When discussing the extension, head coach Paul Maurice said: "Mathieu has found his place, found his home." In the final year of his old contract, Perreault recorded 45 points, including 13 goals, in 65 regular-season games.

After making the Jets' lineup to start the 2017–18 season, Perreault was placed on injured reserve following a game against the Carolina Hurricanes in mid-October. At the time of his injury, Perreault had recorded a goal and two assists in five games. He missed 11 games before being allowed to return to practice in a no-contact jersey. Perreault finished the regular season with 17 goals and 39 points in 70 games before suffering a second injury during the 2018 Stanley Cup playoffs. During the Jets' first-round series against the Minnesota Wild, Perreault endured an upper-body injury following a hit from Mikko Koivu. As a result, he missed the remainder of the series and returned to the Jets' lineup for Game 5 against the Nashville Predators.

Perreault began the 2018–19 season skating on a line with Kristian Vesalainen and Jack Roslovic who described him as a mentor. He managed to play a full 82 games for the first time in his NHL career but decreased in scoring, ending the season with 31 points. While the Jets qualified for the 2019 Stanley Cup playoffs, he was scratched from Game 2 due to an undisclosed injury that occurred during practice.

When Perreault re-joined the Jets for the 2019–20 season, he became only one of two players drafted after the second round in 2006 to reach 600 games. In December 2019, Perreault was placed on concussion protocol after Philadelphia Flyers forward Joel Farabee committed a blindsided hit on him during a 7–3 Jets win. Farabee was subsequently suspended three games by the National Hockey League Department of Player Safety. After being cleared to play, he was hit again during a game against the Vancouver Canucks by Jake Virtanen. Perreault criticized the hit and the lack of suspension saying: "so the next guy that does that to me is going to get my [expletive] stick and I better not get suspended for it." He later apologized for threatening harm but maintained his frustration that no action was taken for the incident.

Prior to the beginning of the delayed 2020–21 NHL season, Perreault was placed on waivers alongside Nelson Nogier, Luca Sbisa, and C. J. Suess due to salary cap issues. A few days later, he was called up from the Jets' taxi squad in case Nikolaj Ehlers contracted COVID-19. He competed with the Jets as they swept the Edmonton Oilers in the first round of the 2021 Stanley Cup playoffs, with him scoring a goal in Game 4 to complete the sweep. During the second round, the Jets were swept by the Montreal Canadiens and eliminated from the playoffs. As he finished the season unsigned to a new contract, Perreault became one of several Jets players remaining an unrestricted free agent.

==== Montreal Canadiens ====
On July 29, 2021, Perreault left the Jets after seven seasons and was signed to a one-year, $950,000 contract with the Montreal Canadiens. In a season where the Canadiens began very poorly, losing five consecutive games at the start and scoring only four goals in the same span, Perreault made headlines by scoring a hat trick in their 6–1 victory over the Detroit Red Wings on October 23. It was the first hat trick for a Quebec native playing for the Canadiens in Montreal since Vincent Damphousse in 1998. He remarked afterward that "you don't even dream about moments like that." Perreault struggled with injury thereafter, first missing all of November and then sustaining an injury on December 14 that kept him out of the lineup for ten weeks. He returned on February 26. On March 5, 2022, he played his 700th NHL game, a 5–2 victory over the Edmonton Oilers. On March 16, after playing just 18 regular season games for the Canadiens, he was placed on waivers. At the time, Perreault had accumulated three goals and two assists for five points. After Perreault was not re-signed by the Canadiens following the end of the 2021–22 season, he chose to retire from professional hockey and join the TVA Sports broadcasting team.

== Personal life ==
Perreault and his wife Jennilie have three children together, two daughters and one son. Perreault has two tattoos, one of the Tasmanian Devil on his lower stomach and a matching wristband with his wife. In 2017, Perreault helped financially support the opening of the Parc-en-ciel, an amusement center for children in Drummondville. In honour of his contributions, July 1 was deemed "Mathieu Perreault Day" at the centre.

== Career statistics ==
| | | | Regular season | | | | | Playoffs |
| Season | Team | League | GP | G | A | Pts | PIM | GP | G | A | Pts | PIM |
|---|---|---|---|---|---|---|---|---|---|---|---|---|
| 2004–05 | Magog Cantonniers | QMAAA | 41 | 25 | 47 | 72 | 68 | 9 | 5 | 10 | 15 | 12 |
| 2005–06 | Acadie-Bathurst Titan | QMJHL | 62 | 18 | 34 | 52 | 42 | 17 | 10 | 11 | 21 | 8 |
| 2006–07 | Acadie-Bathurst Titan | QMJHL | 67 | 41 | 78 | 119 | 66 | 12 | 6 | 8 | 14 | 8 |
| 2007–08 | Acadie-Bathurst Titan | QMJHL | 65 | 34 | 80 | 114 | 61 | 12 | 3 | 19 | 22 | 6 |
| 2007–08 | Hershey Bears | AHL | — | — | — | — | — | 3 | 0 | 0 | 0 | 0 |
| 2008–09 | Hershey Bears | AHL | 77 | 11 | 39 | 50 | 36 | 21 | 2 | 6 | 8 | 8 |
| 2009–10 | Hershey Bears | AHL | 56 | 16 | 34 | 50 | 34 | 21 | 7 | 12 | 19 | 18 |
| 2009–10 | Washington Capitals | NHL | 21 | 4 | 5 | 9 | 6 | — | — | — | — | — |
| 2010–11 | Hershey Bears | AHL | 34 | 11 | 24 | 35 | 38 | 6 | 3 | 3 | 6 | 6 |
| 2010–11 | Washington Capitals | NHL | 35 | 7 | 7 | 14 | 20 | — | — | — | — | — |
| 2011–12 | Washington Capitals | NHL | 64 | 16 | 14 | 30 | 24 | 4 | 0 | 0 | 0 | 0 |
| 2012–13 | HIFK | SM-l | 7 | 1 | 6 | 7 | 6 | — | — | — | — | — |
| 2012–13 | Washington Capitals | NHL | 39 | 6 | 11 | 17 | 20 | 7 | 1 | 3 | 4 | 0 |
| 2013–14 | Anaheim Ducks | NHL | 69 | 18 | 25 | 43 | 36 | 11 | 2 | 3 | 5 | 18 |
| 2014–15 | Winnipeg Jets | NHL | 62 | 18 | 23 | 41 | 38 | 3 | 0 | 2 | 2 | 0 |
| 2015–16 | Winnipeg Jets | NHL | 71 | 9 | 32 | 41 | 36 | — | — | — | — | — |
| 2016–17 | Winnipeg Jets | NHL | 65 | 13 | 32 | 45 | 30 | — | — | — | — | — |
| 2017–18 | Winnipeg Jets | NHL | 70 | 17 | 22 | 39 | 38 | 9 | 1 | 0 | 1 | 4 |
| 2018–19 | Winnipeg Jets | NHL | 82 | 15 | 16 | 31 | 44 | 5 | 0 | 2 | 2 | 8 |
| 2019–20 | Winnipeg Jets | NHL | 49 | 7 | 8 | 15 | 10 | 4 | 0 | 0 | 0 | 2 |
| 2020–21 | Winnipeg Jets | NHL | 56 | 9 | 10 | 19 | 16 | 8 | 1 | 1 | 2 | 4 |
| 2021–22 | Montreal Canadiens | NHL | 25 | 4 | 5 | 9 | 4 | — | — | — | — | — |
| NHL totals | | | 708 | 143 | 209 | 352 | 322 | 51 | 5 | 11 | 16 | 36 |
