= Michal Neuvirth =

Czech ice hockey player (born 1988)

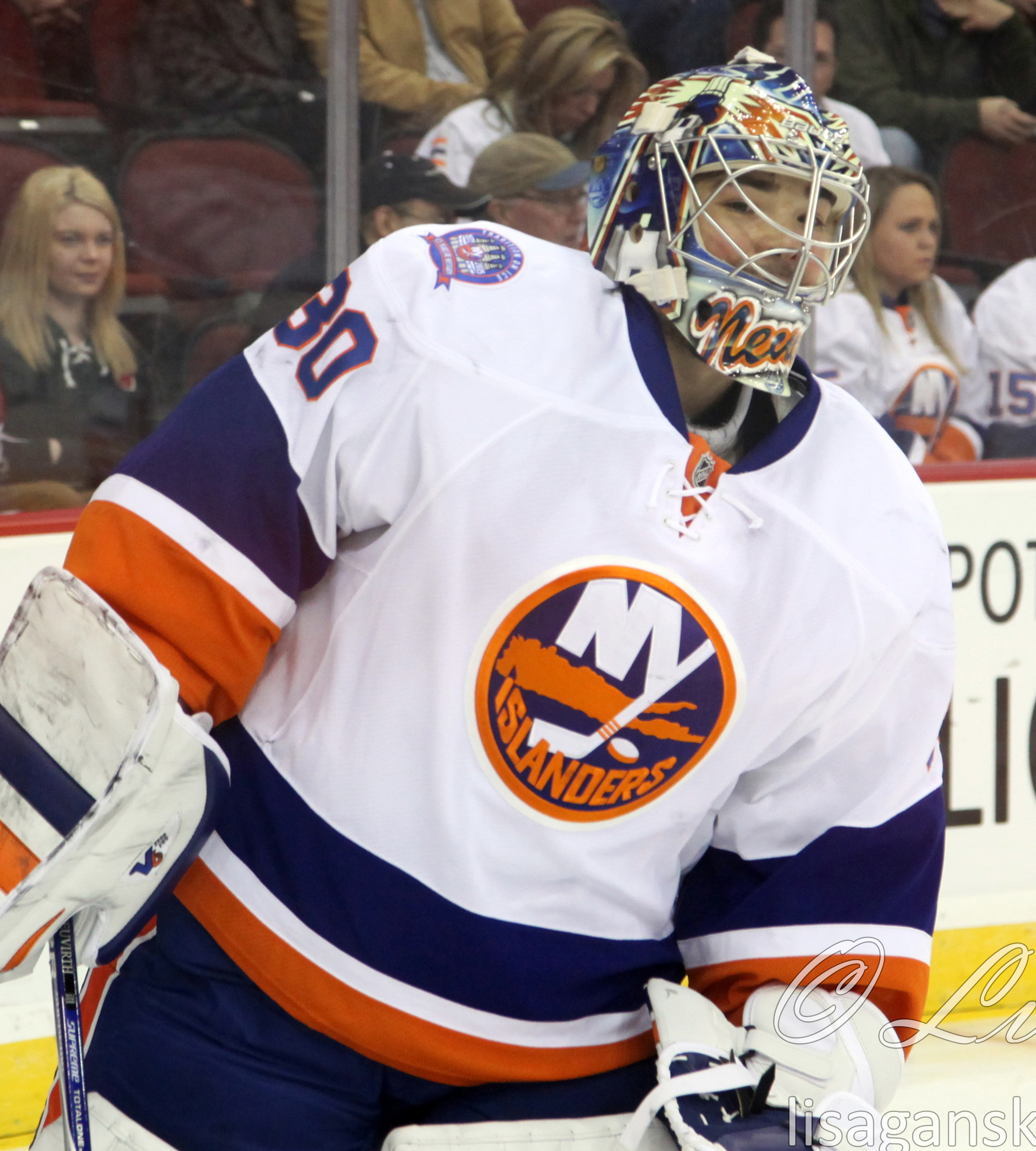
- Neuvirth with the New York Islanders in 2015
- Born: 23 March 1988 (age 38) Ústí nad Labem, Czechoslovakia
- Height: 6 ft 1 in (185 cm)
- Weight: 202 lb (92 kg; 14 st 6 lb)
- Position: Goaltender
- Caught: Left
- Played for: Washington Capitals; HC Sparta Praha; Buffalo Sabres; New York Islanders; Philadelphia Flyers
- National team: Czech Republic
- NHL draft: 34th overall, 2006; Washington Capitals
- Playing career: 2008–2019

Michal Neuvirth (/ˈnɔɪvɪərt/ NOY-veert, Czech: [ˈmɪxal ˈnojvɪrt]; born 23 March 1988) is a Czech former professional ice hockey goaltender. He played for the Washington Capitals, New York Islanders, Buffalo Sabres, and Philadelphia Flyers in the National Hockey League (NHL). He was selected 34th overall by the Washington Capitals in the second round of the 2006 NHL entry draft.

== Playing career ==
=== Junior ===
After being drafted into the NHL by the Capitals, Neuvirth began a two-year major junior career in the Ontario Hockey League (OHL). He began with the Plymouth Whalers in 2006–07 before being traded on 13 November 2007, to the Windsor Spitfires, along with defenceman Tom Kane and a fourth-round draft pick in 2009 in exchange for defenceman Michal Jordán, goaltender Matt Hackett, a 2008 second-round draft pick and a third-round pick in 2009. After spending less than half a season with the Spitfires, he was traded yet again on 8 January 2008, to the Oshawa Generals along with Ryan Baldwin for forward Justin Shugg, goaltender Jakub Kovář and second-round picks in 2008 and 2011.

=== Professional ===
==== Washington Capitals ====
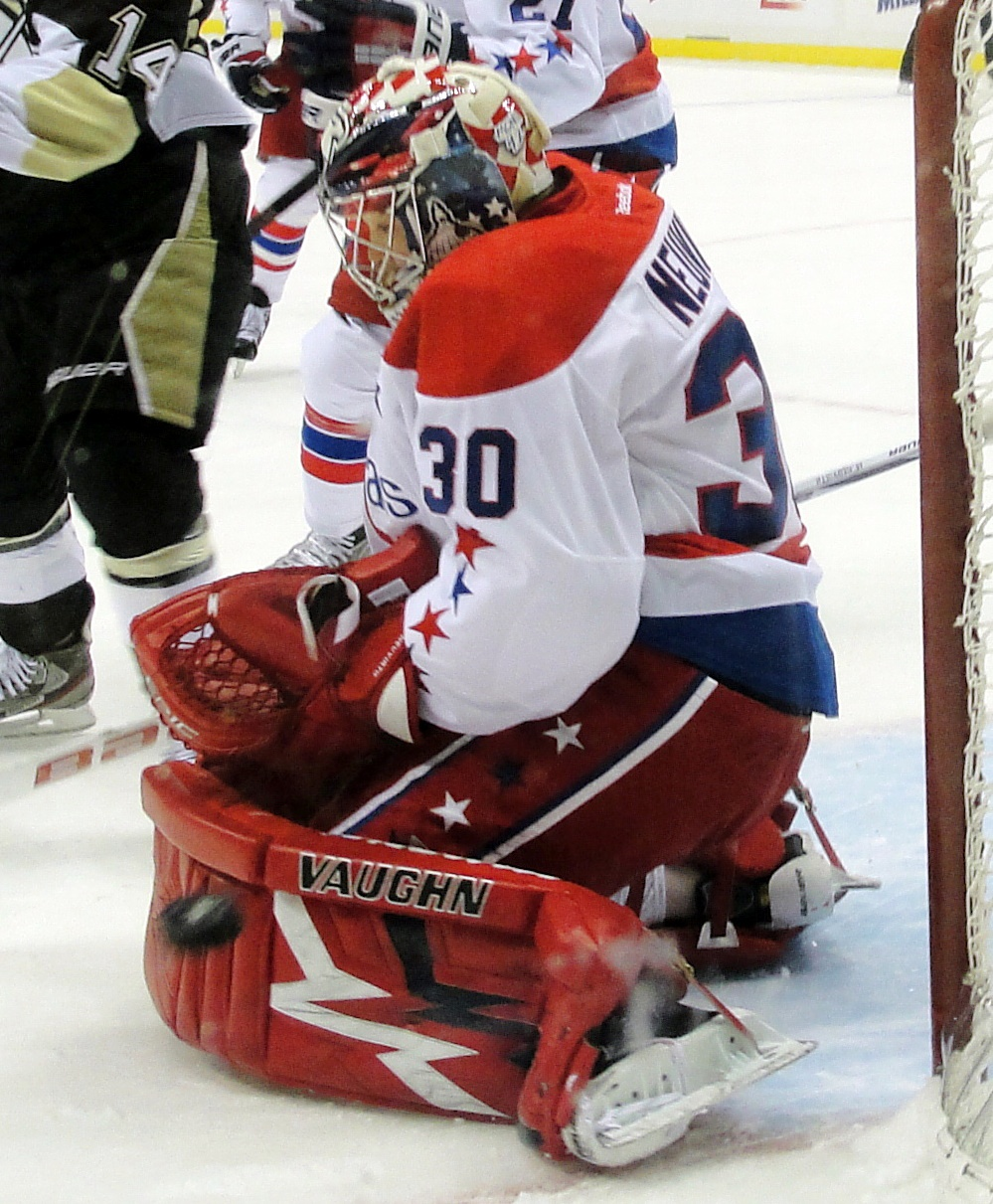
Neuvirth with the Capitals in January 2012.

Neuvirth turned pro in 2008–09 with the South Carolina Stingrays, the Capitals' ECHL affiliate. During his short stint with the Stingrays, he was named to the 2009 ECHL All-Star Game for the American Conference. He was called up to the Hershey Bears of the American Hockey League (AHL) during the season and, before long, received his first NHL call-up to the Capitals when starting goaltender Semyon Varlamov was sidelined due to injury. He made his NHL debut on 14 February 2009, against the Tampa Bay Lightning. Making 31 saves, including a breakaway glove save on Vincent Lecavalier, Neuvirth backstopped the Capitals to a 5–1 victory for his first NHL win. He then played in his Capitals home debut on 26 February against the Atlanta Thrashers, recording another win with a 21-save effort. He finished the season appearing in five games total for the Capitals with a 2–1 record and 3.00 goals against average (GAA).

After being returned to the Bears, Neuvirth helped his team to the 2009 Calder Cup finals. He recorded a shutout in Game 3 for the Bears to take a 2–1 series lead against the Manitoba Moose. Neuvirth then went on with the Hershey Bears to win the 2009 Calder Cup, earning MVP honors after his Game 6 win. Neuvirth went 16–6 in the playoffs and finished the post-season with a 1.92 GAA, topping Frédéric Cassivi's previous AHL playoff best of 2.10 GAA.

After helping the Bears to the back-to-back Calder Cups in 2010, Neuvirth was named the starting goaltender of the Capitals' season opener on 8 October against Atlanta, in which he made 27 saves in a 4–2 loss. Neuvirth went on to beat out Semyon Varlamov for the starting position for the entire season. Despite a solid season as Washington's starter and an adequate playoff performance, Washington demoted Neuvirth to backup goaltender status to make way for Tomáš Vokoun, trading away incumbent backup Varlamov to the Colorado Avalanche in the process. Vokoun's run as Washington's starter only lasted one season, however, and he was injured before the playoffs began. Neuvirth was himself also injured, allowing third goaltender Braden Holtby to start Game 1 of the first round series against the Boston Bruins. Even though Neuvirth managed to return to health in time for Game 3, Holtby went on to start for the duration of Washington's playoff run in 2012. In the off-season, Vokoun left to take the backup goaltender job with the Pittsburgh Penguins. Incoming Capitals head coach Adam Oates then confirmed Holtby as the new starting goaltender of the Washington Capitals during training camp, but failed to rule out Neuvirth reclaiming the starter's role if he were to outplay Holtby.

==== Buffalo Sabres ====
On 5 March 2014, Neuvirth was traded by the Capitals, along with defenceman Rostislav Klesla, to the Buffalo Sabres in exchange for goaltender Jaroslav Halák and a third-round pick. Neuvirth closed out the season with an (0–2–0) record. The next season, Neuvirth posted a record of (6–17–3).

==== New York Islanders ====
Almost one year later, on 2 March 2015, Neuvirth was traded by the Sabres to the New York Islanders in exchange for Chad Johnson and a 2016 third-round draft pick. Neuvirth recorded a (1–3–1) record with the Islanders.

==== Philadelphia Flyers ====
On 1 July 2015, Neuvirth signed a two-year contract as a free agent with the Philadelphia Flyers, to serve as a backup to Steve Mason.

On 1 April 2017, Neuvirth suddenly collapsed on the ice during a game against the New Jersey Devils while there was a stoppage in play at 7:37 of the first period. He was rushed to a nearby hospital after being taken off the ice on a stretcher. Backup goaltender Anthony Stolarz replaced Neuvirth for the rest of the game, which the Flyers won 3–0. The Flyers announced the next afternoon he had been released from the hospital and all tests were normal.

==== Later years ====
After four seasons under contract with the Flyers, Neuvirth left as a free agent following an injury-plagued 2018–19 season. Unable to secure an NHL contract, Neuvirth agreed to an invitation to attend the Toronto Maple Leafs' training camp on a professional tryout (PTO) contract on 22 July 2019.

On 24 September, Toronto released Neuvirth from his PTO contract. As a free agent, Neuvirth sat out the majority of the season before signing a one-year contract in returning to the Czech Republic for the remainder of the year with hometown club, HC Sparta Praha of the ELH, on 23 January 2020. Neuvirth was unable to make any appearances with the club despite being contracted with Sparta over the next two seasons due to lingering injury problems.

== Records ==
- 2009 – Calder Cup Playoffs record; single-playoffs goals against average - 1.92 GAA (surpassed Frédéric Cassivi, 2.10 GAA)

== Personal life ==
Neuvirth married Monika Hybnerova in June 2014, but the couple divorced in July 2015.

On 29 May 2018, Neuvirth married Czech musician Karolina Gudasová, the sister of former Philadelphia Flyers teammate Radko Gudas. He and Gudasová have two children together.

== Career statistics ==
=== Regular season and playoffs ===
			Regular season									Playoffs
Season	Team	League	GP	W	L	T/OT	Min	GA	SO	GAA	SV%	GP	W	L	Min	GA	SO	GAA	SV%
2006–07	Plymouth Whalers	OHL	41	26	8	4	2223	86	4	2.32	.932	18	14	3	1080	44	0	2.45	.932
2007–08	Plymouth Whalers	OHL	10	5	4	1	600	26	0	2.60	.928	—	—	—	—	—	—	—	—
2007–08	Windsor Spitfires	OHL	8	6	1	1	482	17	0	2.12	.918	—	—	—	—	—	—	—	—
2007–08	Oshawa Generals	OHL	15	6	2	6	844	57	0	4.05	.898	9	7	2	507	21	0	2.48	.932
2008–09	South Carolina Stingrays	ECHL	13	6	7	0	762	29	2	2.28	.918	—	—	—	—	—	—	—	—
2008–09	Hershey Bears	AHL	17	9	5	2	1001	45	1	2.70	.913	22	16	6	1346	43	4	1.92	.932
2008–09	Washington Capitals	NHL	5	2	1	0	220	11	0	3.00	.892	—	—	—	—	—	—	—	—
2009–10	Hershey Bears	AHL	22	15	6	0	1231	46	1	2.24	.919	18	14	4	1133	39	1	2.07	.920
2009–10	Washington Capitals	NHL	17	9	4	0	872	40	0	2.75	.914	—	—	—	—	—	—	—	—
2010–11	Washington Capitals	NHL	48	27	12	4	2689	110	4	2.45	.914	9	4	5	590	23	1	2.34	.912
2011–12	Washington Capitals	NHL	38	13	13	5	2020	95	3	2.82	.902	—	—	—	—	—	—	—	—
2012–13	HC Sparta Praha	ELH	24	11	13	0	1342	55	1	2.46	.926	—	—	—	—	—	—	—	—
2012–13	Washington Capitals	NHL	13	4	5	2	723	33	0	2.74	.910	—	—	—	—	—	—	—	—
2013–14	Washington Capitals	NHL	13	4	6	2	767	36	0	2.82	.914	—	—	—	—	—	—	—	—
2013–14	Hershey Bears	AHL	1	1	0	0	60	4	0	4.02	.892	—	—	—	—	—	—	—	—
2013–14	Buffalo Sabres	NHL	2	0	2	0	117	5	0	2.56	.949	—	—	—	—	—	—	—	—
2014–15	Buffalo Sabres	NHL	27	6	17	3	1544	77	0	2.99	.918	—	—	—	—	—	—	—	—
2014–15	New York Islanders	NHL	5	1	3	1	306	15	0	2.94	.881	1	0	0	11	0	0	0.00	1.000
2015–16	Philadelphia Flyers	NHL	32	18	8	4	1826	69	3	2.27	.924	3	2	1	178	2	1	0.67	.981
2016–17	Philadelphia Flyers	NHL	28	11	11	1	1364	64	0	2.82	.891	—	—	—	—	—	—	—	—
2017–18	Philadelphia Flyers	NHL	22	8	7	3	1039	45	1	2.60	.915	3	1	1	150	11	0	4.40	.847
2018–19	Lehigh Valley Phantoms	AHL	1	1	0	0	60	3	0	3.00	.912	—	—	—	—	—	—	—	—
2018–19	Philadelphia Flyers	NHL	7	1	4	1	366	26	0	4.27	.859	—	—	—	—	—	—	—	—
NHL totals			257	105	93	26	13,852	626	11	2.71	.910	16	7	7	930	36	2	2.32	.919

== Awards and honours ==
Award	Year
OHL
Dinty Moore Trophy (2.32)	2007
Dave Pinkney Trophy	2007
Second All-Rookie Team	2007
Second All-Star Team	2007
ECHL
All-Star Game	2009
AHL
Jack A. Butterfield Trophy	2009
Calder Cup (Hershey Bears)	2009, 2010
NHL
Rookie of the Month (October)	2010
