= Matt Zaba =

Canadian ice hockey player

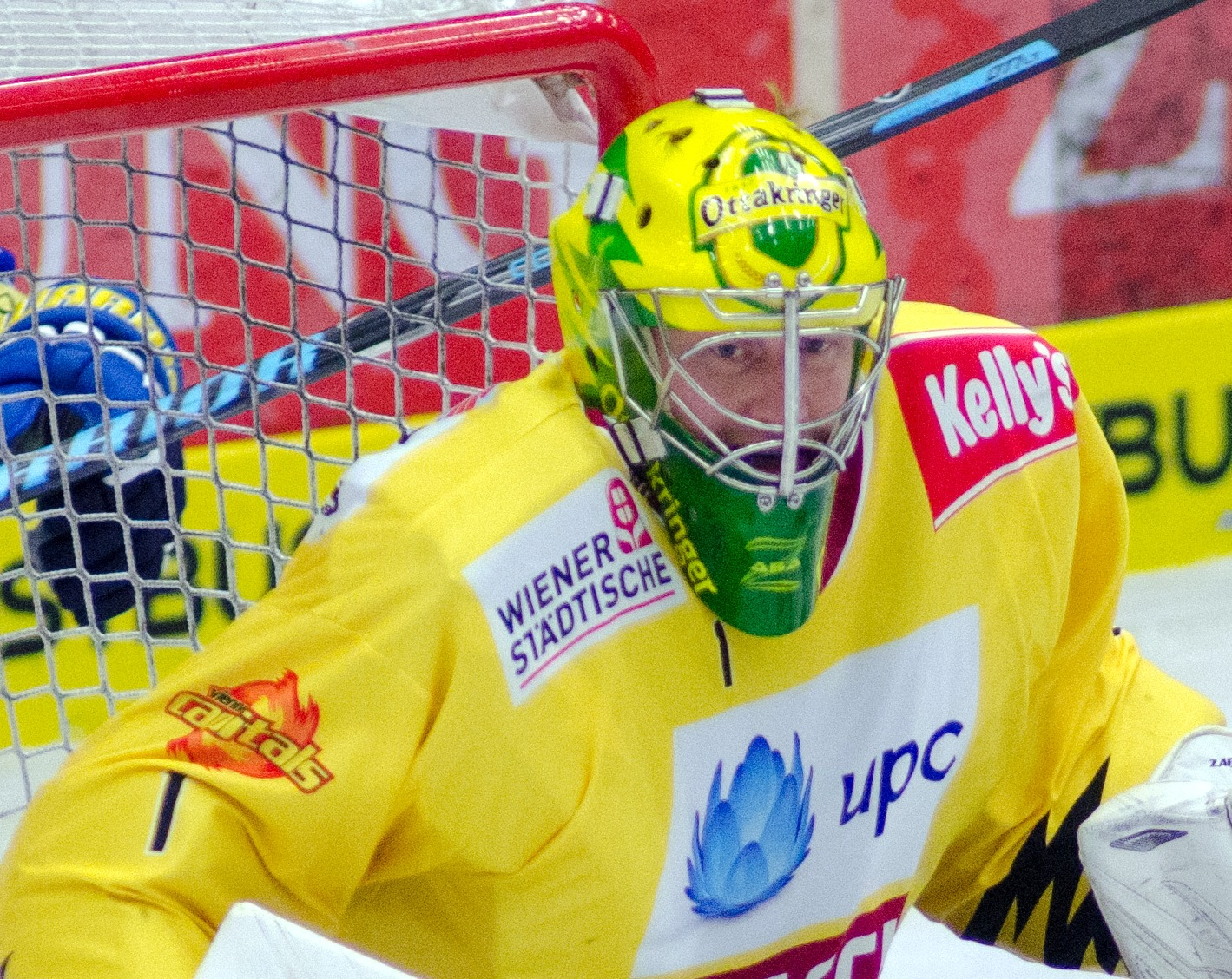
- Zaba with the Vienna Capitals in 2014
- Born: July 14, 1983 (age 42) Yorkton, Saskatchewan, Canada
- Height: 6 ft 1 in (185 cm)
- Weight: 190 lb (86 kg; 13 st 8 lb)
- Position: Goaltender
- Caught: Left
- Played for: New York Rangers; HC Bolzano; Vienna Capitals
- NHL draft: 231st overall, 2003; Los Angeles Kings
- Playing career: 2007–2015

Matthew Darrell Zaba (born July 14, 1983) is a Canadian former professional ice hockey goaltender who played one game in the National Hockey League with the New York Rangers in 2010. The rest of his career, which lasted from 2007 to 2015, was spent in the minor leagues and later in the Italian and Austrian leagues.

== Playing career ==
Zaba was originally selected 231st overall in the 2003 NHL entry draft by the Los Angeles Kings.

Zaba played for New York Rangers of the National Hockey League. He made his NHL debut in the 2009–10 season on January 23, 2010, replacing Henrik Lundqvist in a game against the Montreal Canadiens.

Unable to earn a new contract with the Rangers, Zaba left as a free agent to Europe, ending up in the Italian Serie A with HC Bolzano.

After two successful seasons with the Foxes, Zaba moved to the Neighbouring EBEL, signing a contract with the Vienna Capitals on May 8, 2012.

After three seasons with the Vienna Capitals, Zaba retired from professional hockey to take up a Goaltending coach position with the under-18 side the Colorado Rampage on July 25, 2015.

== Career statistics ==
=== Regular season and playoffs ===
			Regular season										Playoffs
Season	Team	League	GP	W	L	T	OTL	MIN	GA	SO	GAA	SV%	GP	W	L	MIN	GA	SO	GAA	SV%
2000–01	Yorkton Mallers U18	SMAAAHL	26	13	10	3	—	1480	79	0	3.20	—	—	—	—	—	—	—	—	—
2001–02	Penticton Panthers	BCHL	33	—	—	—	—	1980	128	0	3.69	—	—	—	—	—	—	—	—	—
2002–03	Vernon Vipers	BCHL	44	34	9	0	—	2012	96	2	2.21	—	—	—	—	—	—	—	—	—
2003–04	Colorado College	WCHA	23	10	10	2	—	1323	50	1	2.27	.911	—	—	—	—	—	—	—	—
2004–05	Colorado College	WCHA	18	10	5	2	—	1050	43	2	2.46	.916	—	—	—	—	—	—	—	—
2005–06	Colorado College	WCHA	36	20	14	2	—	2068	87	4	2.52	.909	—	—	—	—	—	—	—	—
2006–07	Colorado College	WCHA	33	15	13	4	—	1908	76	3	2.39	.917	—	—	—	—	—	—	—	—
2007–08	Charlotte Checkers	ECHL	9	3	4	—	1	496	30	0	3.63	.891	—	—	—	—	—	—	—	—
2007–08	Idaho Steelheads	ECHL	19	12	4	—	1	1070	39	3	2.19	.927	—	—	—	—	—	—	—	—
2008–09	Hartford Wolf Pack	AHL	41	25	10	—	0	2262	88	2	2.33	.920	—	—	—	—	—	—	—	—
2009–10	New York Rangers	NHL	1	0	0	—	0	34	2	0	3.56	.875	—	—	—	—	—	—	—	—
2009–10	Hartford Wolf Pack	AHL	25	6	12	—	2	1296	68	0	3.15	.899	—	—	—	—	—	—	—	—
2009–10	Charlotte Checkers	ECHL	3	2	1	—	0	185	11	0	3.58	.884	—	—	—	—	—	—	—	—
2010–11	HC Bolzano	ITA	38	25	12	—	0	2240	78	4	2.09	.931	—	—	—	—	—	—	—	—
2011–12	HC Bolzano	ITA	40	26	13	—	0	2343	79	3	2.02	.926	—	—	—	—	—	—	—	—
2012–13	Vienna Capitals	EBEL	32	20	11	—	0	—	—	4	2.04	.927	—	—	—	—	—	—	—	—
2013–14	Vienna Capitals	EBEL	47	30	17	—	0	—	—	4	2.40	.917	—	—	—	—	—	—	—	—
2014–15	Vienna Capitals	EBEL	38	20	17	—	0	—	—	4	2.29	.920	—	—	—	—	—	—	—	—
NHL totals			2	0	1	0	70	5	0	4.35	.815	—	—	—	—	—	—	—	—

== Awards and honours ==
Award	Year
All-WCHA Rookie Team	2003–04
