= Mikko Lehtonen (ice hockey, born 1987) =

Finnish ice hockey player

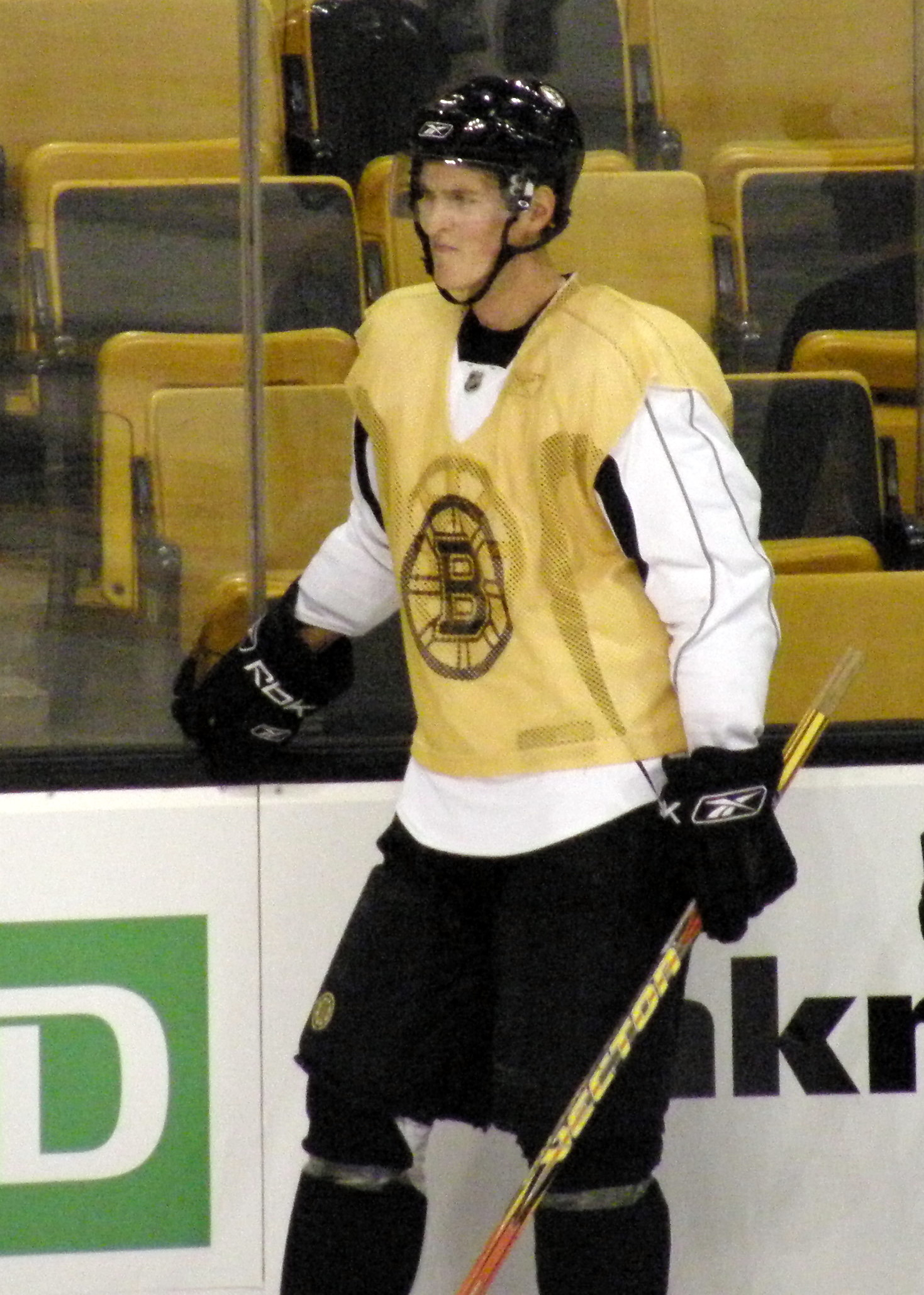
- Mikko Lehtonen in September 2008
- Born: 1 April 1987 (age 39) Espoo, Finland
- Height: 6 ft 4 in (193 cm)
- Weight: 218 lb (99 kg; 15 st 8 lb)
- Position: Right wing
- Shoots: Right
- EBEL team Former teams: Fehérvár AV19; Espoo Blues; Boston Bruins; Skellefteå AIK; Severstal Cherepovets; ZSC Lions; SC Bern; HC Lugano; Örebro HK; Djurgårdens IF; Oulun Kärpät; HPK; KHL Medveščak Zagreb
- NHL draft: 83rd overall, 2005; Boston Bruins
- Playing career: 2005–present

Mikko Kristian Lehtonen (born 1 April 1987) is a Finnish professional ice hockey winger currently playing for ESV Kaufbeuren in the DEL2.

== Playing career ==
Lehtonen was drafted by Boston Bruins in the 3rd round (83rd selection) of 2005 NHL entry draft. Mikko was drafted from Finnish team, Espoo Blues of the SM-liiga. On 31 May 2007, the Boston Bruins signed Lehtonen to an entry-level contract.

Lehtonen made his North American debut in the 2008–09 season with Boston's American Hockey League affiliate, the Providence Bruins. Lehtonen made his NHL debut in the Bruins penultimate regular season game in a 6–1 defeat to the Buffalo Sabres on 11 April 2009.

While with Skellefteå on 28 February 2011, Lehtonen's NHL rights were traded by the Bruins along with Jeff Penner to the Minnesota Wild in exchange for Anton Khudobin.

On 4 May 2011, Lehtonen was announced as the new player of KHL's Severstal Cherepovets.

== Career statistics ==
=== Regular season and playoffs ===
			Regular season					Playoffs
Season	Team	League	GP	G	A	Pts	PIM	GP	G	A	Pts	PIM
2002–03	Blues	FIN U18	11	1	3	4	2	1	0	0	0	0
2003–04	Blues	FIN U18	20	8	7	15	22	—	—	—	—	—
2003–04	Blues	FIN U20	19	3	0	3	0	5	0	0	0	0
2004–05	Blues	FIN U18	1	0	1	1	0	—	—	—	—	—
2004–05	Blues	FIN U20	37	6	9	15	38	6	3	1	4	0
2004–05	Blues	SM-l	1	0	0	0	0	—	—	—	—	—
2005–06	Blues	FIN U20	15	3	4	7	12	10	5	2	7	6
2005–06	Blues	SM-l	25	4	0	4	0	—	—	—	—	—
2006–07	Blues	SM-l	39	6	9	15	24	9	1	1	2	4
2007–08	Blues	SM-l	42	8	12	20	12	17	1	8	9	4
2008–09	Providence Bruins	AHL	72	28	25	53	39	14	2	5	7	4
2008–09	Boston Bruins	NHL	1	0	0	0	0	—	—	—	—	—
2009–10	Providence Bruins	AHL	78	23	27	50	58	—	—	—	—	—
2009–10	Boston Bruins	NHL	1	0	0	0	0	—	—	—	—	—
2010–11	Skellefteå AIK	SEL	55	30	28	58	34	18	3	5	8	2
2011–12	Severstal Cherepovets	KHL	48	11	10	21	24	6	0	0	0	0
2012–13	Severstal Cherepovets	KHL	23	3	6	9	8	—	—	—	—	—
2012–13	ZSC Lions	NLA	6	1	3	4	2	11	4	3	7	4
2013–14	SC Bern	NLA	32	4	9	13	12	—	—	—	—	—
2013–14	HC Lugano	NLA	3	1	0	1	2	2	0	1	1	0
2014–15	Skellefteå AIK	SHL	25	5	4	9	6	—	—	—	—	—
2014–15	Örebro HK	SHL	19	5	7	12	8	6	2	1	3	0
2015–16	Örebro HK	SHL	32	3	7	10	16	—	—	—	—	—
2015–16	Djurgårdens IF	SHL	18	3	6	9	4	8	0	2	2	4
2016–17	Kärpät	Liiga	56	12	13	25	50	1	0	0	0	0
2017–18	HPK	Liiga	33	3	4	7	8	—	—	—	—	—
2017–18	KHL Medveščak Zagreb	AUT	10	1	6	7	10	6	2	1	3	12
2018–19	KHL Medveščak Zagreb	AUT	1	0	1	1	0	—	—	—	—	—
2019–20	Hydro Fehérvár AV19	AUT	33	4	10	14	14	—	—	—	—	—
2019–20	Dragons de Rouen	FRA	8	6	4	10	4	4	2	3	5	10
2021–22	Kiekko–Espoo	Mestis	26	12	14	26	10	—	—	—	—	—
2021–22	ESV Kaufbeuren	DEL2	12	8	12	20	2	2	0	0	0	0
Liiga totals			193	33	38	71	94	27	2	9	11	8
NHL totals			2	0	0	0	0	—	—	—	—	—
SHL totals			149	46	52	98	68	32	5	8	13	6

Medal record

Ice hockey

Representing Finland

World Junior Championships
Bronze medal – third place	2006 Vancouver	

=== International ===
Year	Team	Event	Result	GP	G	A	Pts	PIM
2004	Finland	U17	8th	5	3	3	6	0
2005	Finland	WJC18	7th	6	2	3	5	2
2006	Finland	WJC	3rd place, bronze medalist(s)	7	0	1	1	2
2007	Finland	WJC	6th	6	4	6	10	0
Junior totals				24	9	13	22	4
