= Matt Beaudoin =

Canadian ice hockey player

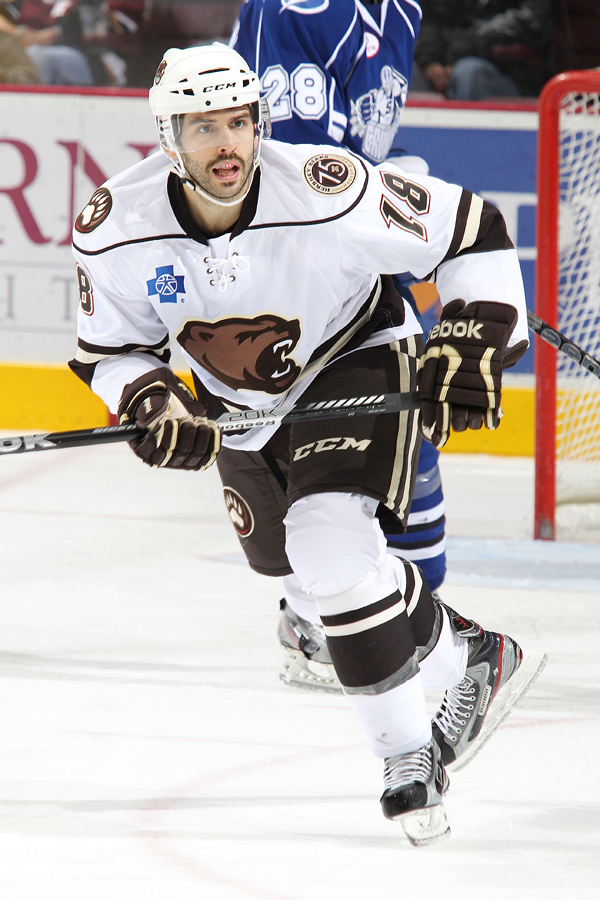
- Beaudoin with the Hershey Bears in 2012
- Born: April 6, 1984 (age 42) Rock Forest, Quebec, Canada
- Height: 5 ft 11 in (180 cm)
- Weight: 190 lb (86 kg; 13 st 8 lb)
- Position: Right wing
- Shot: Right
- Played for: Iowa Stars; Rochester Americans; Hershey Bears; San Antonio Rampage; Milwaukee Admirals; Houston Aeros; Texas Stars; Portland Pirates; Rockford IceHogs; HC Bolzano
- NHL draft: Undrafted
- Playing career: 2007–2014

Mathieu Beaudoin (born April 6, 1984) is a Canadian former professional ice hockey right wing who played predominantly in the American Hockey League (AHL).

On July 3, 2010 Beaudoin was signed as a free agent to a one-year contract by the NHL's Phoenix Coyotes, he was later reassigned to AHL affiliate, the San Antonio Rampage for the 2010–11 season.

Beaudoin signed a one-year deal with the Hershey Bears of the AHL on July 3, 2012. During the 2012–13 season, Beaudoin was traded by the Bears to the Rockford IceHogs as part of future considerations in an NHL trade between Affiliates, the Chicago Blackhawks and the Washington Capitals for Peter LeBlanc on January 31, 2013.

== Career statistics ==
			Regular season					Playoffs
Season	Team	League	GP	G	A	Pts	PIM	GP	G	A	Pts	PIM
2003–04	Ohio State University	CCHA	40	7	7	14	26	—	—	—	—	—
2004–05	Ohio State University	CCHA	40	23	11	34	50	—	—	—	—	—
2005–06	Ohio State University	CCHA	32	8	8	16	18	—	—	—	—	—
2006–07	Ohio State University	CCHA	37	14	11	25	24	—	—	—	—	—
2006–07	Arizona Sundogs	CHL	—	—	—	—	—	14	2	1	3	14
2007–08	Las Vegas Wranglers	ECHL	1	0	1	1	0	—	—	—	—	—
2007–08	Dayton Bombers	ECHL	61	38	30	68	44	2	0	0	0	0
2007–08	Iowa Stars	AHL	3	0	0	0	0	—	—	—	—	—
2007–08	Rochester Americans	AHL	1	0	0	0	0	—	—	—	—	—
2007–08	Hershey Bears	AHL	7	0	0	0	2	1	0	0	0	0
2008–09	Las Vegas Wranglers	ECHL	15	10	6	16	10	—	—	—	—	—
2008–09	San Antonio Rampage	AHL	1	0	1	1	2	—	—	—	—	—
2008–09	Milwaukee Admirals	AHL	2	0	0	0	0	—	—	—	—	—
2008–09	Houston Aeros	AHL	41	11	8	19	17	20	8	9	17	12
2009–10	Texas Stars	AHL	72	19	25	44	22	22	4	3	7	4
2010–11	San Antonio Rampage	AHL	63	21	30	51	24	—	—	—	—	—
2011–12	Portland Pirates	AHL	47	5	17	22	14	—	—	—	—	—
2012–13	Hershey Bears	AHL	32	3	7	10	2	—	—	—	—	—
2012–13	Rockford IceHogs	AHL	21	1	3	4	8	—	—	—	—	—
2013–14	HC Bolzano	EBEL	50	9	18	27	16	—	—	—	—	—
AHL totals			289	60	91	151	91	43	12	12	24	16
