= Maxime Fortunus =

Canadian ice hockey player (born 1983)

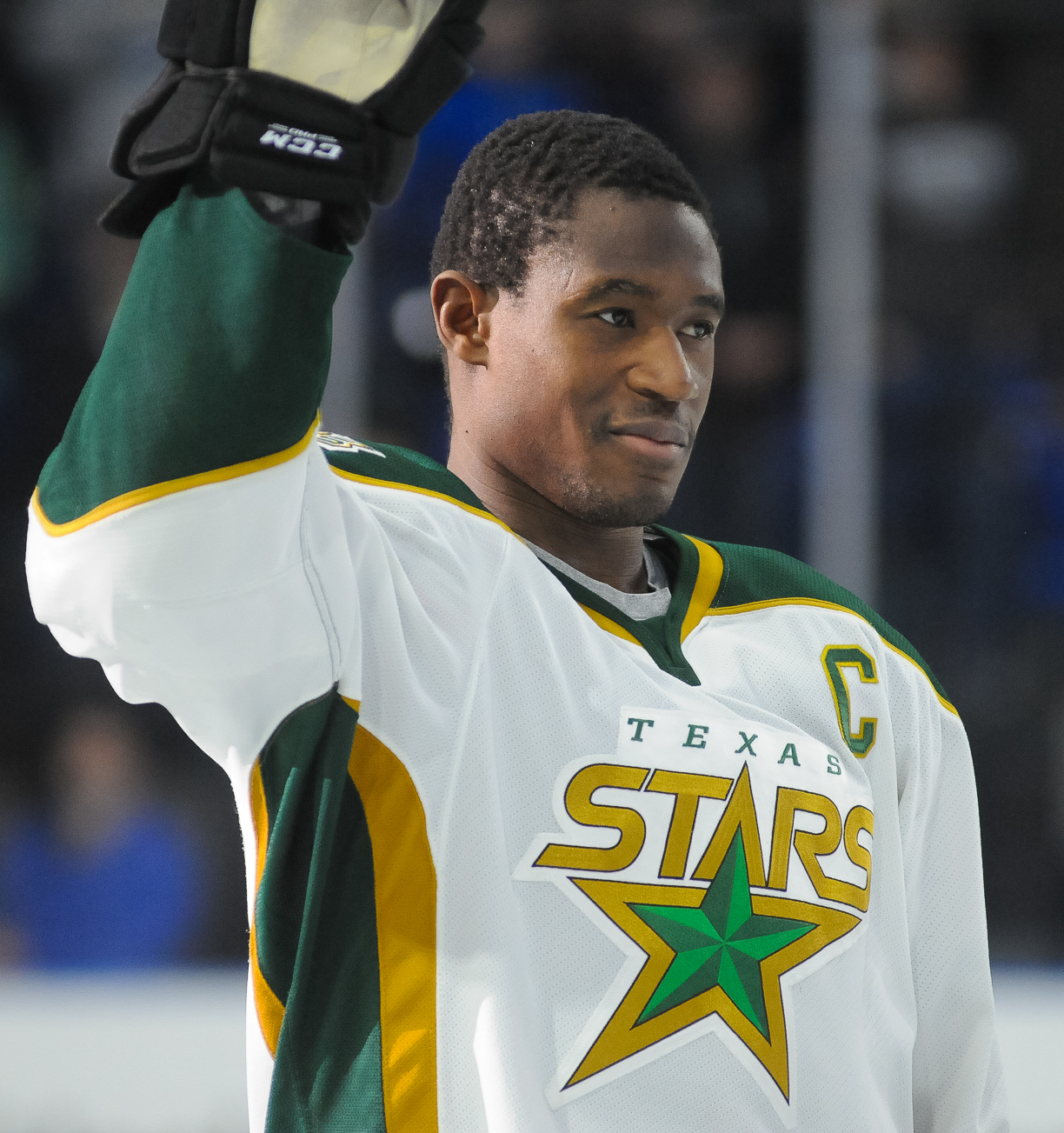
- Fortunus with the Texas Stars in 2015
- Born: July 28, 1983 (age 42) La Prairie, Quebec, Canada
- Height: 5 ft 11 in (180 cm)
- Weight: 202 lb (92 kg; 14 st 6 lb)
- Position: Defence
- Shot: Right
- Played for: Dallas Stars; Fischtown Pinguins
- NHL draft: Undrafted
- Playing career: 2003–2021

Maxime Fortunus (born July 28, 1983) is a Canadian former professional ice hockey defenceman who most recently played for the Fischtown Pinguins of the Deutsche Eishockey Liga (DEL). Fortunus is of Haitian descent, his parents being born in Haiti, then immigrating to Canada in the 1970s.

== Playing career ==
Prior to playing in the QMJHL, Fortunus played Midget AAA hockey for the Charles Lemoyne Riverains and was a 2nd round choice of the Baie-Comeau Drakkar in the 1999 QMJHL Midget Draft.

Fortunus played junior ice hockey for the Baie-Comeau Drakkar of the Quebec Major Junior Hockey League from 1999 to 2003 before turning professional with the Louisiana IceGators of the ECHL. Fortunus has played over 700 games in the American Hockey League for the Houston Aeros, the Manitoba Moose, and the Texas Stars.

Fortunus was signed as a free agent by the Dallas Stars of the NHL on July 3, 2008. In the 2009–10 season, he has played for both Dallas and the Stars' top affiliate team in the AHL, the Texas Stars, where he is a regular.

Fortunus signed a one-year two-way deal with the Dallas Stars on July 13, 2012.

After six seasons within the Stars organization, serving as a mainstay veteran presence to their AHL affiliates, Fortunus signed as a free agent to a two-year AHL contract with the Iowa Wild, affiliate to the Minnesota Wild on July 1, 2015.

At the conclusion of his contract with the Iowa, he went un-signed over the summer as a free agent. With the 2017–18 season underway, he belatedly signed a professional tryout contract with the Springfield Thunderbirds on November 14, 2017. As a staple on the blueline for the Thunderbirds, Fortunus appeared in 54 games for 2 goals and 12 points.

Having completed his 15th consecutive year in the AHL, Fortunus left as a free agent and signed his first contract abroad at the age of 34 on a one-year deal with German outfit, Fischtown Pinguins of the DEL, on May 7, 2018.

In May 2021, Fortunus announced his retirement from professional hockey and rejoined the Dallas Stars organization as an assistant coach of the Texas Stars in the American Hockey League.

== Career statistics ==
			Regular season					Playoffs
Season	Team	League	GP	G	A	Pts	PIM	GP	G	A	Pts	PIM
1998–99	Collège Charles-Lemoyne	QMAAA	39	3	10	13	18	—	—	—	—	—
1999–2000	Baie-Comeau Drakkar	QMJHL	68	6	15	21	36	6	0	0	0	2
2000–01	Baie-Comeau Drakkar	QMJHL	71	10	31	41	106	11	2	4	6	6
2001–02	Baie-Comeau Drakkar	QMJHL	72	11	30	41	76	5	0	1	1	2
2002–03	Baie-Comeau Drakkar	QMJHL	69	12	32	44	44	12	2	4	6	6
2003–04	Baie-Comeau Drakkar	QMJHL	5	1	0	1	15	—	—	—	—	—
2003–04	Louisiana IceGators	ECHL	64	3	15	18	27	4	1	1	2	0
2003–04	Houston Aeros	AHL	12	0	2	2	2	1	0	0	0	0
2004–05	Louisiana IceGators	ECHL	59	8	16	24	26	—	—	—	—	—
2004–05	Houston Aeros	AHL	13	0	0	0	4	—	—	—	—	—
2005–06	Manitoba Moose	AHL	76	3	10	13	36	13	0	0	0	10
2006–07	Manitoba Moose	AHL	72	2	18	20	64	13	1	4	5	10
2007–08	Manitoba Moose	AHL	65	8	13	21	28	6	0	1	1	4
2008–09	Manitoba Moose	AHL	58	7	12	19	18	22	3	7	10	2
2009–10	Texas Stars	AHL	72	11	12	23	28	24	2	7	9	14
2009–10	Dallas Stars	NHL	8	0	0	0	4	—	—	—	—	—
2010–11	Texas Stars	AHL	73	5	29	34	20	6	0	1	1	2
2011–12	Texas Stars	AHL	60	6	14	20	18	—	—	—	—	—
2012–13	Texas Stars	AHL	67	7	21	28	16	9	0	1	1	2
2013–14	Texas Stars	AHL	65	6	22	28	18	21	0	4	4	8
2013–14	Dallas Stars	NHL	1	0	1	1	0	—	—	—	—	—
2014–15	Texas Stars	AHL	65	9	25	34	31	3	0	0	0	2
2015–16	Iowa Wild	AHL	66	6	11	17	18	—	—	—	—	—
2016–17	Iowa Wild	AHL	64	4	11	15	20	—	—	—	—	—
2017–18	Springfield Thunderbirds	AHL	54	2	10	12	18	—	—	—	—	—
2018–19	Fischtown Pinguins	DEL	52	3	17	20	14	3	1	0	1	2
2019–20	Fischtown Pinguins	DEL	52	2	14	16	18	—	—	—	—	—
AHL totals			882	76	210	286	339	118	6	25	31	54
NHL totals			9	0	1	1	4	—	—	—	—	—

== Awards and honours ==
Award	Year
AHL
Calder Cup (Texas Stars)	2014
