= Alexandre Bolduc =

Canadian ice hockey player (born 1985)

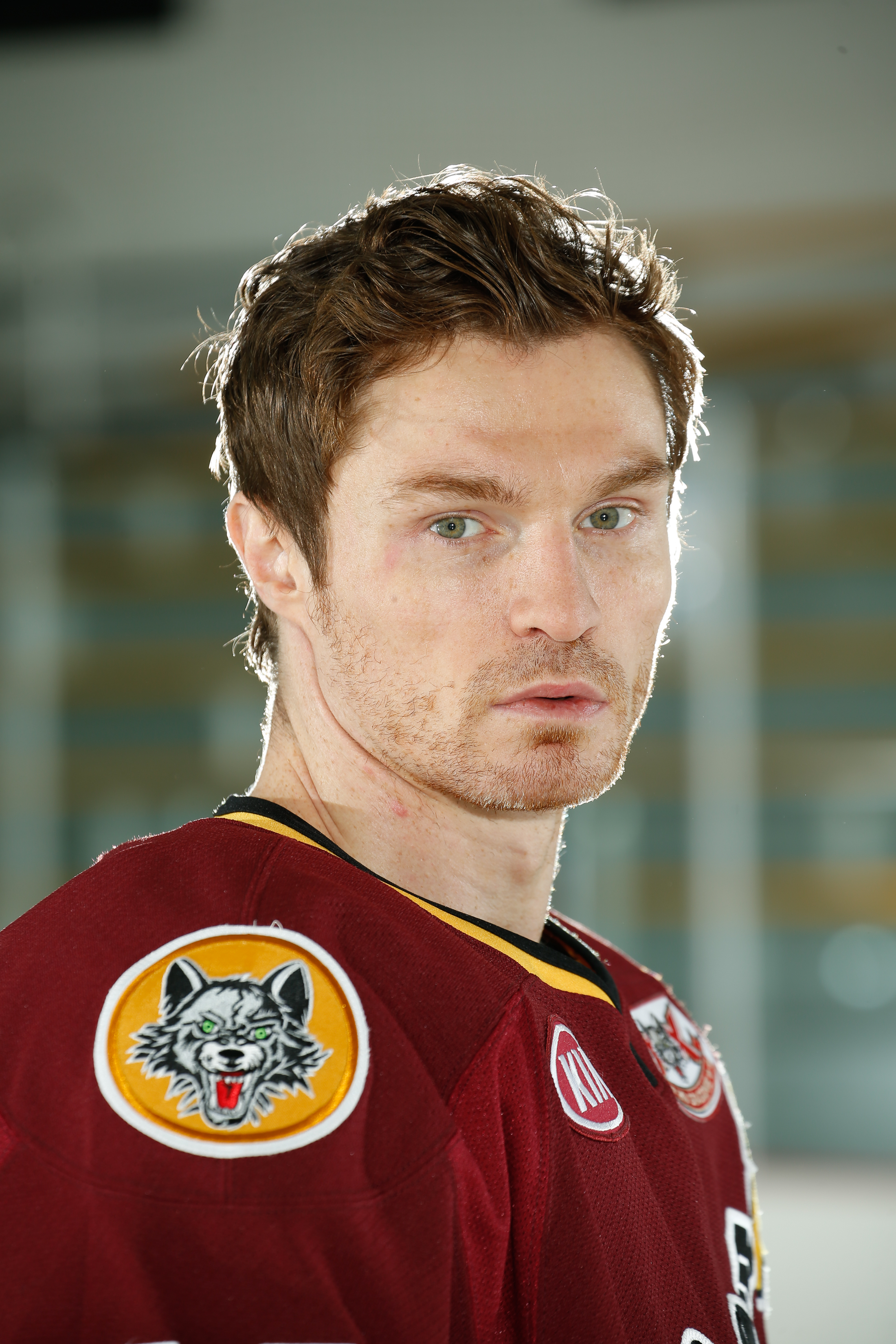
- Bolduc with the Chicago Wolves in January 2014
- Born: June 26, 1985 (age 41) Montreal, Quebec, Canada
- Height: 6 ft 1 in (185 cm)
- Weight: 197 lb (89 kg; 14 st 1 lb)
- Position: Centre
- Shot: Left
- Played for: Vancouver Canucks; Arizona Coyotes; Traktor Chelyabinsk; Medveščak Zagreb; Kölner Haie; Nottingham Panthers
- NHL draft: 127th overall, 2003; St. Louis Blues
- Playing career: 2005–2020

Alexandre Bolduc (born June 26, 1985) is a Canadian former professional ice hockey centre who played in the National Hockey League (NHL).

== Playing career ==
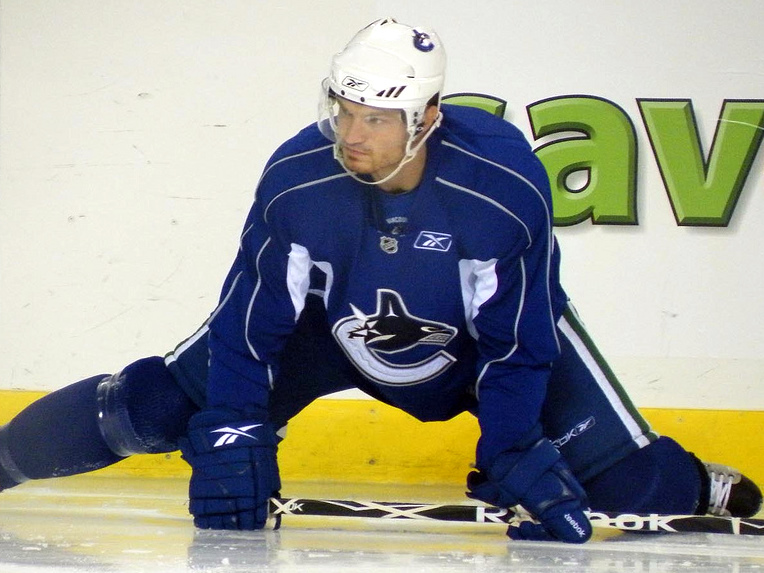
Bolduc during the Canucks' 2009 training camp

Bolduc played major junior in the Quebec Major Junior Hockey League (QMJHL) for four seasons with the Rouyn-Noranda Huskies and Shawinigan Cataractes. After his second season in the QMJHL, a 14-goal, 43-point campaign with the Huskies, he was selected in the fourth round, 127th overall, by the St. Louis Blues in the 2003 NHL entry draft. However, at the end of his junior career, he was a free agent and signed with the Bakersfield Condors of the ECHL.

During his first season with the Condors, he moved up to the AHL with the Manitoba Moose. In 2007–08, Bolduc recorded a strong 37-point campaign with the Moose and was signed by the Moose's NHL affiliate, the Vancouver Canucks on July 9, 2008.

Continuing to play for the Moose as part of the Canucks' farm system in 2008–09 season, Bolduc was called up by the Canucks on November 25, 2008, to replace an injured Ryan Johnson and played his first NHL game on November 27 against the Calgary Flames. He scored his first career NHL goal against Craig Anderson of the Colorado Avalanche on January 2, 2011.

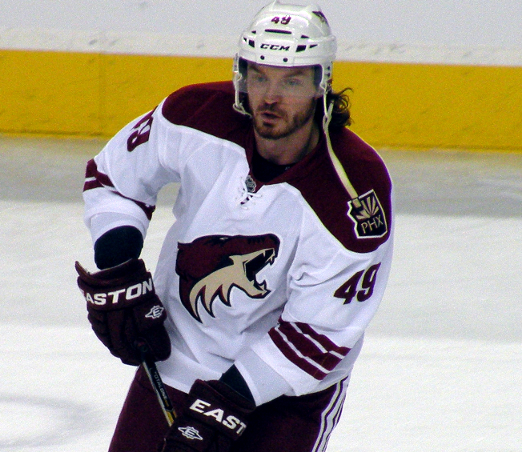
Bolduc with the Phoenix Coyotes in April 2013

On July 2, 2011, Bolduc left Vancouver, signing a one-year, two-way contract with the Phoenix Coyotes.

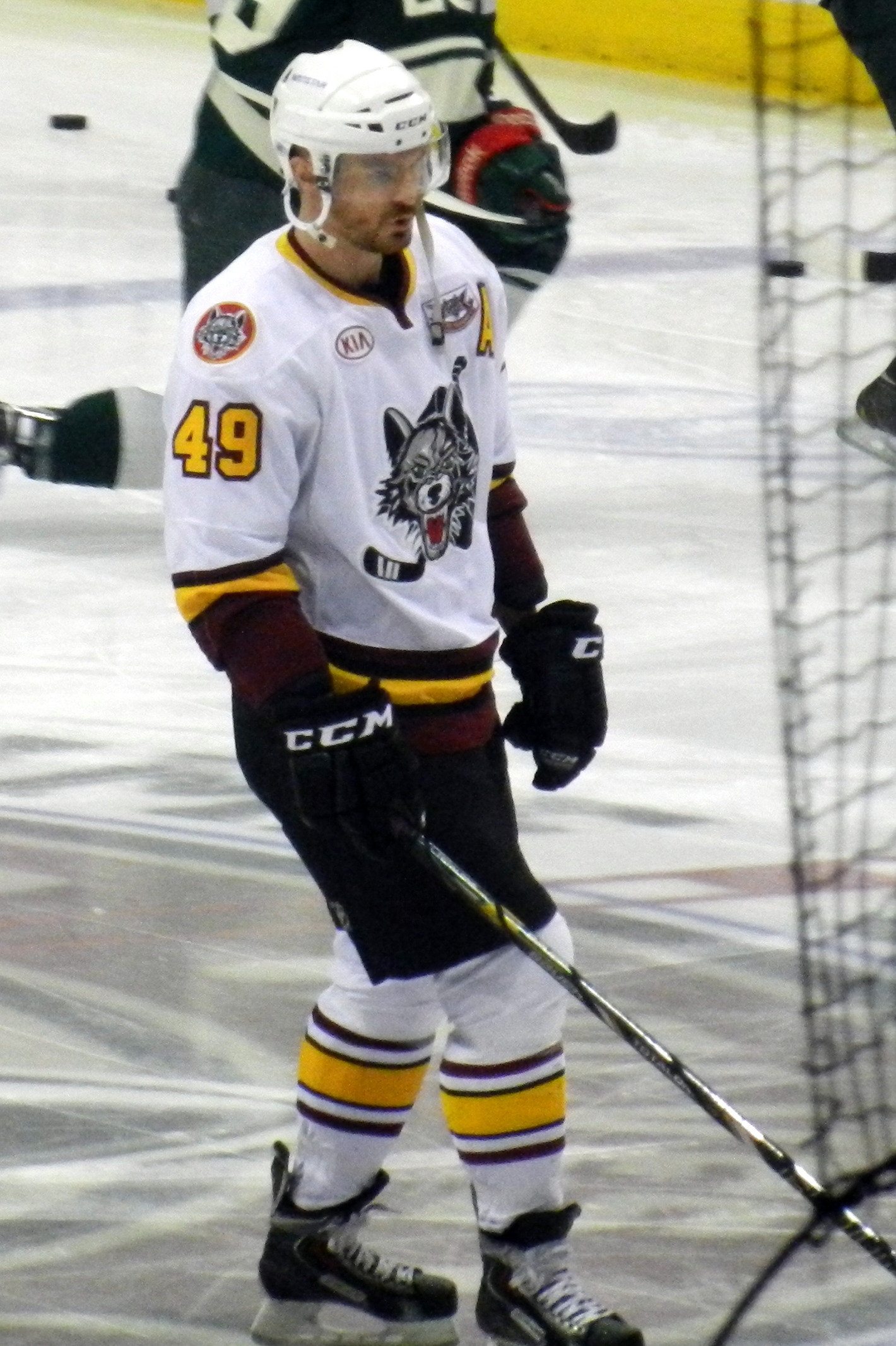
Bolduc playing with the Chicago Wolves in April 2014

On July 5, 2013, Bolduc left the Coyotes after recording no points with the club in two years. He signed a one-year contract with the St. Louis Blues worth $550,000. In the following 2013–14 season, he was assigned to their AHL affiliate, the Chicago Wolves, for the duration of the season scoring 37 points in 59 games.

On July 1, 2014, Bolduc agreed to return to the Coyotes organization, signing a one-year, two-way contract with Arizona. In the 2014–15 season, Bolduc appeared in three games with the Coyotes. He primarily spent the duration of the year in his second stint as captain of the Portland Pirates, contributing 52 points in 62 games.

Bolduc left the NHL as an impending free agent on June 3, 2015, after signing a one-year contract with a Russian club, Traktor Chelyabinsk of the KHL. Bolduc struggled to cement a role in Traktor and after a stint with VHL affiliate, Chelmet Chelyabinsk, he was traded to Croatian KHL participant, KHL Medveščak Zagreb, on October 21, 2015. He left Zagreb on February 1, 2017, and signed with Kölner Haie of the German DEL.

After a season with the Nottingham Panthers, Bolduc signed for Rivière-du-Loup 3L in 2019.

== Career statistics ==
=== Regular season and playoffs ===
			Regular season					Playoffs
Season	Team	League	GP	G	A	Pts	PIM	GP	G	A	Pts	PIM
2001–02	Rouyn–Noranda Huskies	QMJHL	64	6	14	20	69	4	1	1	2	4
2002–03	Rouyn–Noranda Huskies	QMJHL	66	14	29	43	131	4	0	2	2	2
2003–04	Rouyn–Noranda Huskies	QMJHL	65	23	35	58	115	11	3	4	7	18
2004–05	Rouyn–Noranda Huskies	QMJHL	33	7	10	17	46	—	—	—	—	—
2004–05	Shawinigan Cataractes	QMJHL	29	7	11	18	14	3	0	0	0	0
2005–06	Bakersfield Condors	ECHL	24	10	6	16	56	11	4	4	8	28
2005–06	Manitoba Moose	AHL	29	3	7	10	35	—	—	—	—	—
2006–07	Bakersfield Condors	ECHL	16	7	17	24	42	6	2	4	6	9
2006–07	Manitoba Moose	AHL	32	4	5	9	35	5	0	0	0	8
2007–08	Manitoba Moose	AHL	70	18	19	37	93	6	1	0	1	6
2008–09	Manitoba Moose	AHL	62	12	21	33	116	13	5	4	9	14
2008–09	Vancouver Canucks	NHL	7	0	1	1	4	—	—	—	—	—
2009–10	Vancouver Canucks	NHL	15	0	0	0	13	—	—	—	—	—
2009–10	Manitoba Moose	AHL	13	2	1	3	20	—	—	—	—	—
2010–11	Vancouver Canucks	NHL	24	2	2	4	21	3	0	0	0	0
2010–11	Manitoba Moose	AHL	26	6	9	15	28	14	4	0	4	20
2011–12	Portland Pirates	AHL	23	3	12	15	30	—	—	—	—	—
2011–12	Phoenix Coyotes	NHL	2	0	0	0	2	—	—	—	—	—
2012–13	Portland Pirates	AHL	56	24	27	51	90	1	1	1	2	2
2012–13	Phoenix Coyotes	NHL	14	0	0	0	2	—	—	—	—	—
2013–14	Chicago Wolves	AHL	59	18	19	37	82	—	—	—	—	—
2014–15	Portland Pirates	AHL	62	23	29	52	106	2	0	0	0	0
2014–15	Arizona Coyotes	NHL	3	0	0	0	2	—	—	—	—	—
2015–16	Traktor Chelyabinsk	KHL	3	0	0	0	4	—	—	—	—	—
2015–16	Chelmet Chelyabinsk	VHL	6	2	2	4	15	—	—	—	—	—
2015–16	KHL Medveščak Zagreb	KHL	26	2	6	8	49	—	—	—	—	—
2016–17	KHL Medveščak Zagreb	KHL	47	4	8	12	120	—	—	—	—	—
2016–17	Kölner Haie	DEL	8	0	4	4	12	7	1	0	1	10
2017–18	Kölner Haie	DEL	14	1	2	3	34	6	0	1	1	2
2018–19	Nottingham Panthers	EIHL	45	9	17	26	70	3	0	0	0	0
2019–20	Rivière–du–Loup 3L	LNAH	20	6	18	24	26	—	—	—	—	—
AHL totals			433	113	149	262	635	41	11	5	16	50
NHL totals			65	2	3	5	44	3	0	0	0	0

=== International ===
Year	Team	Event	Result	GP	G	A	Pts	PIM
2003	Canada	WJC18	1st place, gold medalist(s)	7	1	0	1	8
Junior totals				7	1	0	1	8
