= Jeff Penner =

American ice hockey player

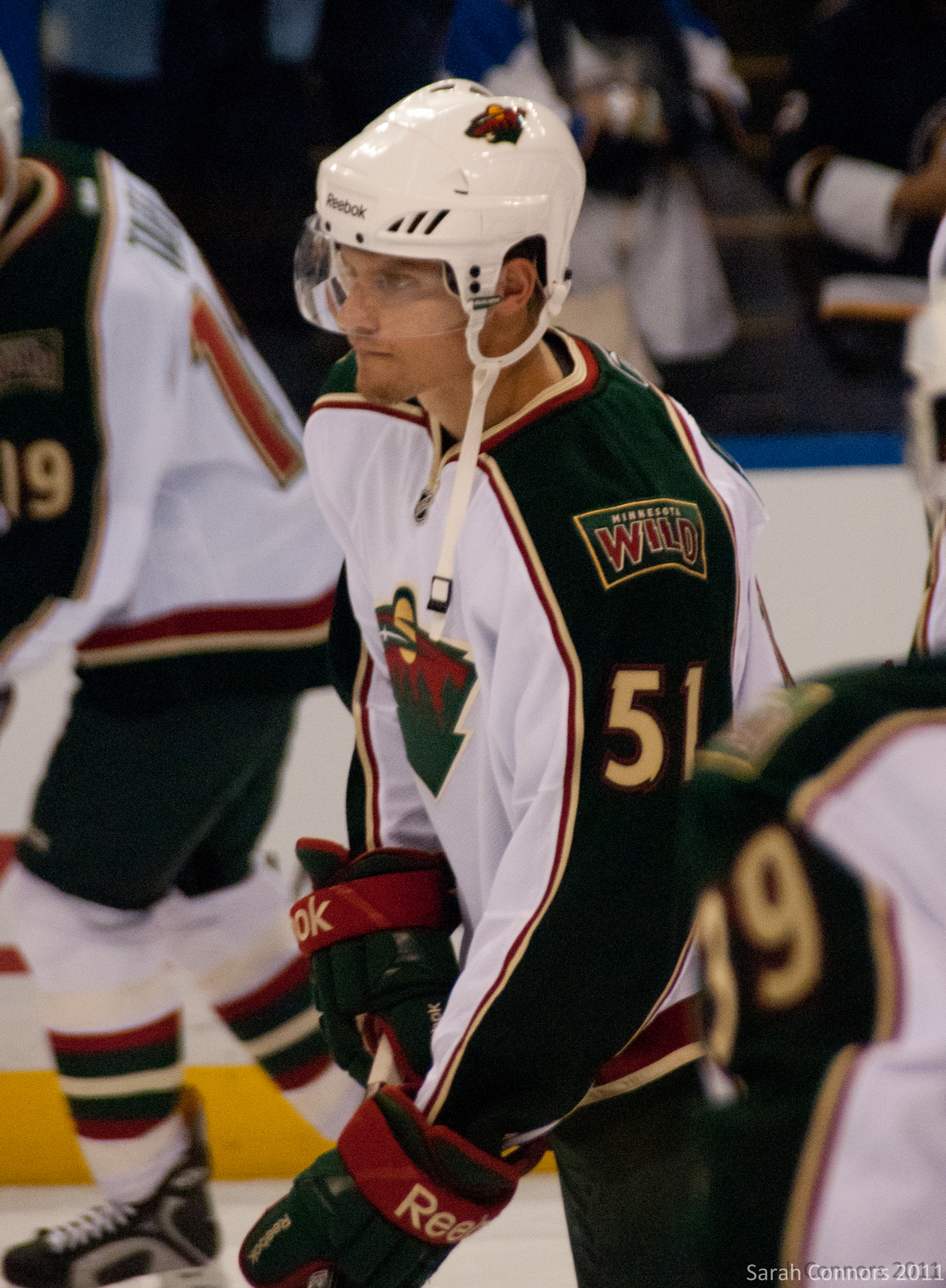
- Jeff Penner with the Minnesota Wild during a preseason game (2011)
- Born: April 13, 1987 (age 37); Steinbach, Manitoba, Canada
- Height: 5 ft 10 in (178 cm)
- Weight: 183 lb (83 kg; 13 st 1 lb)
- Position: Defence
- Shot: Left
- Played for: Boston Bruins
- NHL draft: Undrafted
- Playing career: 2008–2012

Jeffrey Ryan Penner (born April 13, 1987) is a Canadian former professional ice hockey defenceman who played two National Hockey League (NHL) games with the Boston Bruins during the 2009–10 season.

== Playing career ==
Undrafted, Penner made his NHL debut on March 9, 2010 against the Toronto Maple Leafs. Prior to turning professional, he played for the Dauphin Kings of the Manitoba Junior Hockey League, and the University of Alaska Fairbanks in the National Collegiate Athletic Association. Penner played for the Providence Bruins of the American Hockey League prior to being called up to the NHL by the Bruins.

On February 28, 2011, Penner was traded by the Bruins along with Mikko Lehtonen to the Minnesota Wild in exchange for Anton Khudobin.

== Career statistics ==
=== Regular season and playoffs ===
			Regular season					Playoffs
Season	Team	League	GP	G	A	Pts	PIM	GP	G	A	Pts	PIM
2005–06	Powell River Kings	BCHL	2	0	0	0	0	—	—	—	—	—
2005–06	Southeast Blades	MJHL	6	2	0	2	2	—	—	—	—	—
2005–06	Dauphin Kings	MJHL	44	8	27	35	44	13	0	8	8	15
2006–07	Dauphin Kings	MJHL	45	9	44	53	98	18	5	11	16	18
2007–08	University of Alaska Fairbanks	CCHA	35	5	7	12	49	—	—	—	—	—
2007–08	Providence Bruins	AHL	2	0	0	0	0	—	—	—	—	—
2008–09	Providence Bruins	AHL	80	10	18	28	50	16	6	5	11	8
2009–10	Providence Bruins	AHL	68	7	28	35	28	—	—	—	—	—
2009–10	Boston Bruins	NHL	2	0	0	0	0	—	—	—	—	—
2010–11	Providence Bruins	AHL	57	5	14	19	30	—	—	—	—	—
2010–11	Houston Aeros	AHL	10	0	4	4	8	5	0	4	4	2
2011–12	Houston Aeros	AHL	30	3	9	12	18	—	—	—	—	—
AHL totals			247	25	73	98	134	21	6	9	15	8
NHL totals			2	0	0	0	0	—	—	—	—	—
