= Kirk MacDonald (ice hockey) =

Canadian ice hockey player

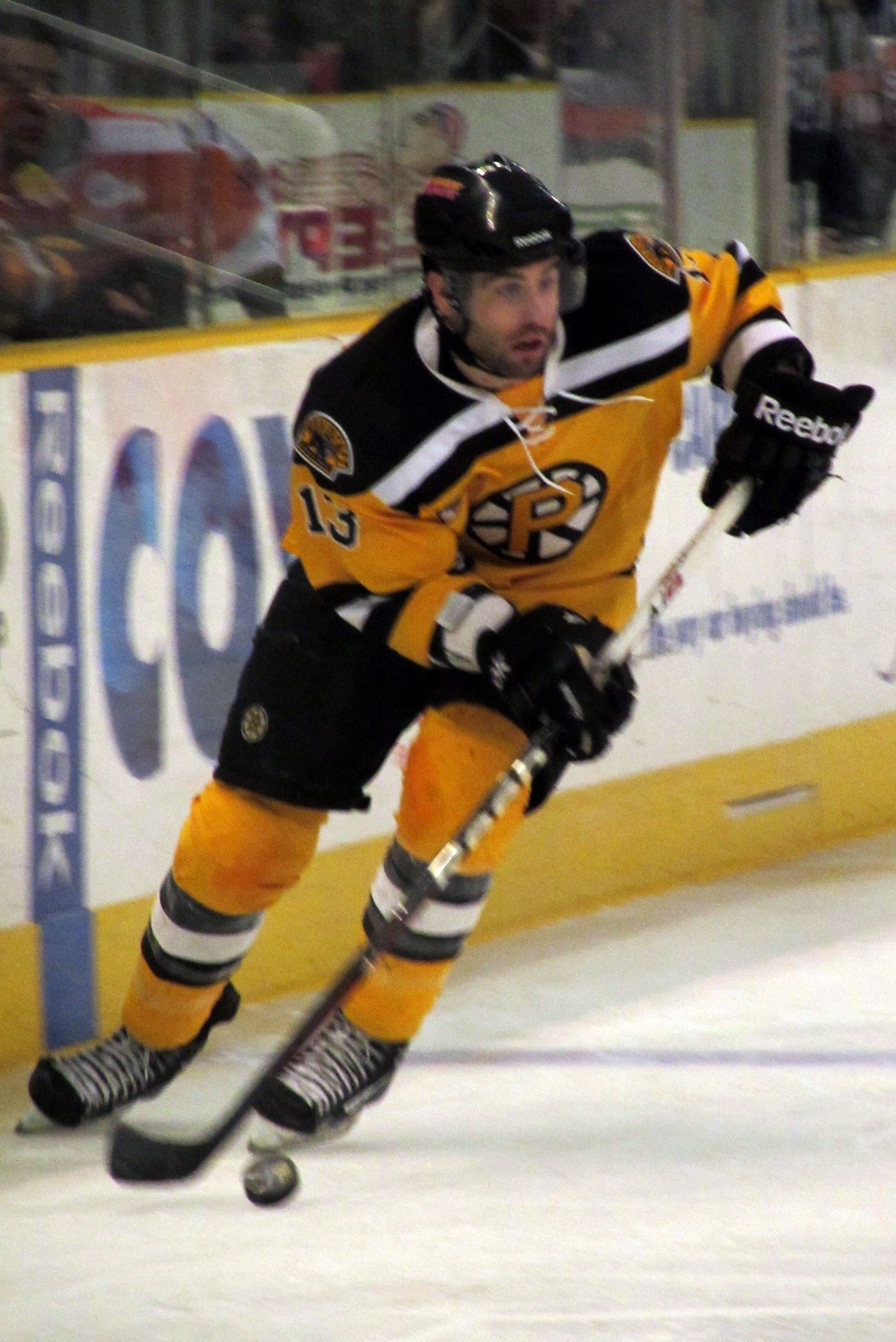
- MacDonald with the Providence Bruins
- Born: December 18, 1983 (age 42) Victoria, British Columbia, Canada
- Height: 6 ft 2 in (188 cm)
- Weight: 210 lb (95 kg; 15 st 0 lb)
- Position: Right wing
- Shot: Right
- NHL draft: Undrafted
- Playing career: 2007–2013

Kirk MacDonald (born December 18, 1983) is a Canadian former professional ice hockey forward who is currently serving as the head coach for the Wilkes-Barre/Scranton Penguins of the American Hockey League (AHL).

== Career ==
MacDonald previously served as the head coach of the Reading Royals of the ECHL, where he led the Royals to a winning record in each of his six years at the helm. He previously played for the Providence Bruins of the American Hockey League and was briefly under contract to the Boston Bruins, having played in several National Hockey League preseason games.

Macdonald became the head coach of the Dubuque Fighting Saints for the 2022-23 season. After a playoff berth in his first season, Macdonald led the Saints all the way to the Clark Cup Finals in 2023-24. However, the Saints would ultimately fall to the Fargo Force in four games.

On June 19, 2024, MacDonald announced he accepted the role of head coach of the Wilkes-Barre/Scranton Penguins of the American Hockey League (AHL) after two seasons in Dubuque. It is his first coaching stint in the AHL.
