= Jason Jaffray =

Canadian ice hockey player (born 1981)

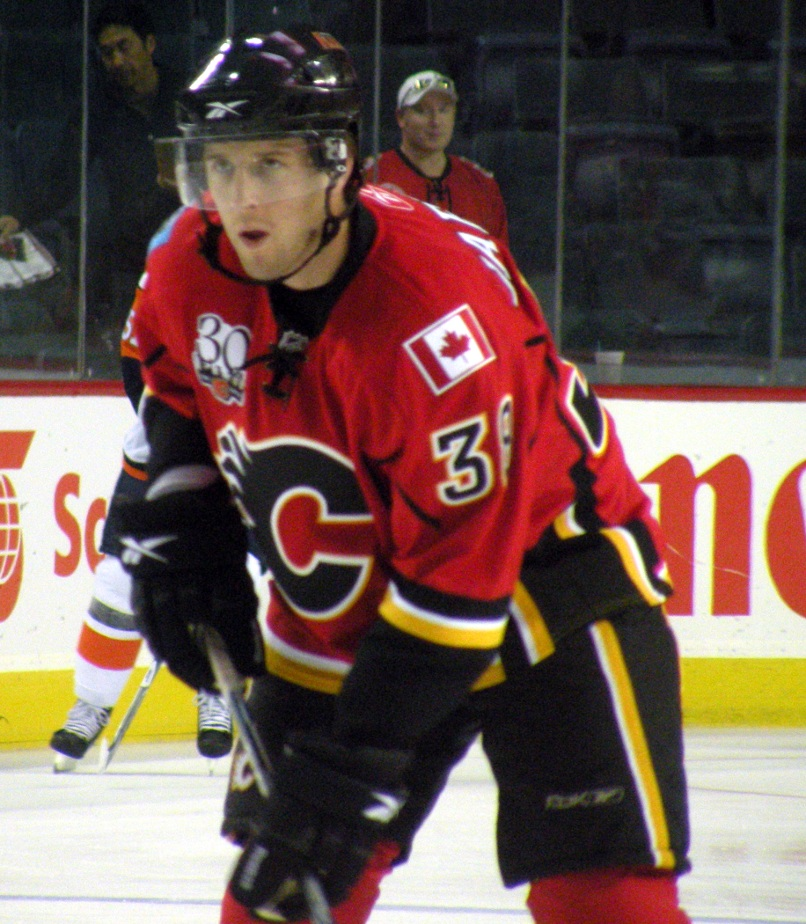
- Born: June 30, 1981 (age 45) Rimbey, Alberta, Canada
- Height: 6 ft 1 in (185 cm)
- Weight: 209 lb (95 kg; 14 st 13 lb)
- Position: Left wing
- Shot: Left
- Played for: Vancouver Canucks; Calgary Flames; Winnipeg Jets; EHC München
- NHL draft: Undrafted
- Playing career: 2002–2020

Jason Jaffray (born June 30, 1981) is a Canadian former professional ice hockey left winger. He played in the National Hockey League (NHL) with the Vancouver Canucks, Calgary Flames and the Winnipeg Jets before finishing his career with EHC München of the Deutsche Eishockey Liga (DEL).

== Playing career ==
Jaffray appeared in five seasons of major junior in the Western Hockey League. He played six games for the Edmonton Ice in 1997–98 before they relocated to Cranbrook, British Columbia the following season, becoming the Kootenay Ice. In 1999–2000, Jaffray appeared in the 2000 Memorial Cup as Kootenay won the WHL Championship. He recorded 19 points in 21 WHL playoff games before Kootenay was eliminated in the round-robin of the Memorial Cup tournament.

Midway through Jaffray's final WHL season, 2000–01, he was traded to the Swift Current Broncos and accumulated a junior career-high 83 points in 73 games.

Undrafted, Jaffray turned professional in the ECHL with the Roanoke Express. Named Rookie of the Month twice (November and December), he tallied 85 points in 64 games and earned the 2003 CCM Tacks Rookie of the Year Award. He was also named to the ECHL First All-Star Team and All-Rookie Team.

The next season, Jaffray played for the Wheeling Nailers of the ECHL and was named to the Second All-Star Team after finishing third in goal-scoring with 37. In his first two seasons in the ECHL, he appeared in several American Hockey League games as well with the Norfolk Admirals and Wilkes-Barre/Scranton Penguins. Jaffray began in the ECHL for a third season in 2004–05 before signing a tryout contract with the Cleveland Barons on December 14, 2004. He played on a line with San Jose Sharks prospects Ryane Clowe and Marcel Goc, posting 16 points in 30 games. His tenure with the club was cut short, however, as the Barons inadvertently forgot to renew his working visa, making him ineligible to play in the United States. On his way back to his hometown of Olds, Alberta, Jaffray got a phone call from Manitoba Moose general manager Craig Heisinger. Two Moose players had come down with sickness and Hisinger asked Jaffray if he could play in Hamilton, Ontario, that night for a game against the Hamilton Bulldogs. Jaffray changed direction on the highway and made it to Hamilton in time to score the lone goal for Manitoba in a 3–1 loss. He signed a tryout contract with the Moose on February 26, 2005.

In 2006–07, Jaffray recorded an AHL career-high 81 points in 77 games, leading the Moose in team scoring. Early in the season, on October 24, 2006, Jaffray tied a Moose franchise record for most goals in one game with four against the Chicago Wolves. He went on set further Moose records with all-time franchise highs of nine game-winning goals and 16 powerplay goals (tied with Lee Goren and Scott Thomas, 1998–99). As Manitoba advanced the second round of the Calder Cup playoffs, he added a team-high 13 points in 13 games. Jaffray's successful year culminated in an AHL Second Team All-Star selection and his first NHL contract, signed with the Moose's NHL affiliate, the Vancouver Canucks.

Jaffray was called up for his first NHL game on December 12, 2007, against the Anaheim Ducks, due to an injury to Brendan Morrison. Jaffray picked up his first NHL point on a 2-on-1 with Moose teammate Mason Raymond, who was also called up. Incidentally, the assist was on Raymond's first NHL goal. Later in the game, Jaffray scored his own first goal, the eventual game winner, against J. S. Giguere as the Canucks beat Anaheim 3–2. Jaffray completed 2007–08 appearing in 19 games with the Canucks.

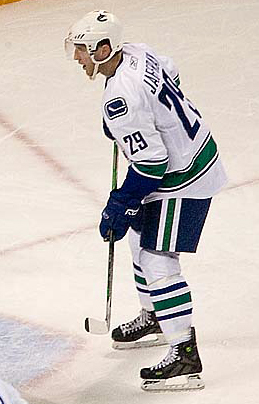
Jaffray with the Canucks in 2007

The following season, Jaffray appeared in 14 more games for the Canucks, while recording 49 points in 56 games for the Moose. He helped Manitoba to the AHL's top regular season record en route to a 2009 playoff run to the Calder Cup Finals against the Hershey Bears. Jaffray notched a hat trick in game two of the Finals, scoring all 3 goals for his club to defeat the Bears 3–1. He scored the game-winning goal to break the 1–1 tie in the final minute of regulation before adding an empty netter to secure the win. The Moose, however, were defeated in six games.

In the off-season, Jaffray was signed by the Calgary Flames on July 7, 2009. He switched AHL clubs to the Flames' Abbotsford Heat minor league affiliate, ending his tenure with the Moose as the club's franchise all-time leader in game-winning goals (19), power-play goals (39) and plus-minus. In five seasons, he also finished second in goals (95), behind Jimmy Roy (102), and in assists (138) and points (233), behind Brett Hauer (193 and 251, respectively).

At season's end, Jaffray was traded by the Flames to the Anaheim Ducks for Logan MacMillan on June 30, 2010.

Jaffray signed with the Winnipeg Jets on July 18, 2011, returning him to the city where he had played most of his professional career. He started the 2011–12 season with the St. John's IceCaps, the Jets' AHL affiliate, and played 15 games before being called up on November 13. After playing 13 games with the Jets, he was returned to the IceCaps on December 19. In the off-season, Jaffray signed a one-year, AHL contract, with the IceCaps. Jaffray is the all-time scoring leader for the Moose/IceCaps' franchise

After a 13-year professional career in North America, Jaffray signed his first European contract on June 21, 2015, signing a one-year deal with the German club, EHC München of the DEL.

Jaffray played five seasons in Germany with EHC München, claiming three consecutive championships, before ending his 18-year professional career following the 2019–20 season on March 9, 2020.

== Personal ==
Jaffray is married to Michelle, the daughter of his billet family with whom he lived while he played for the Kootenay Ice. They have a daughter and a son.

== Career statistics ==
| | | | Regular season | | | | | Playoffs |
| Season | Team | League | GP | G | A | Pts | PIM | GP | G | A | Pts | PIM |
|---|---|---|---|---|---|---|---|---|---|---|---|---|
| 1997–98 | Edmonton Ice | WHL | 6 | 0 | 1 | 1 | 0 | — | — | — | — | — |
| 1998–99 | Kootenay Ice | WHL | 57 | 14 | 12 | 26 | 50 | 7 | 1 | 2 | 3 | 6 |
| 1999–00 | Kootenay Ice | WHL | 71 | 24 | 28 | 52 | 104 | 21 | 10 | 9 | 19 | 17 |
| 2000–01 | Kootenay Ice | WHL | 70 | 31 | 42 | 73 | 108 | 11 | 5 | 7 | 12 | 10 |
| 2001–02 | Kootenay Ice | WHL | 32 | 15 | 19 | 34 | 38 | — | — | — | — | — |
| 2001–02 | Swift Current Broncos | WHL | 41 | 23 | 26 | 49 | 44 | 12 | 4 | 5 | 9 | 25 |
| 2002–03 | Roanoke Express | ECHL | 64 | 34 | 51 | 85 | 89 | 4 | 0 | 3 | 3 | 4 |
| 2002–03 | Norfolk Admirals | AHL | 2 | 0 | 0 | 0 | 0 | — | — | — | — | — |
| 2003–04 | Wheeling Nailers | ECHL | 54 | 37 | 37 | 74 | 81 | 2 | 1 | 1 | 2 | 2 |
| 2003–04 | Wilkes-Barre/Scranton Penguins | AHL | 5 | 0 | 1 | 1 | 0 | — | — | — | — | — |
| 2004–05 | Wheeling Nailers | ECHL | 23 | 6 | 6 | 12 | 22 | — | — | — | — | — |
| 2004–05 | Cleveland Barons | AHL | 30 | 10 | 6 | 16 | 23 | — | — | — | — | — |
| 2004–05 | Manitoba Moose | AHL | 14 | 4 | 4 | 8 | 6 | 1 | 0 | 0 | 0 | 0 |
| 2005–06 | Manitoba Moose | AHL | 73 | 12 | 35 | 47 | 58 | 13 | 6 | 1 | 7 | 11 |
| 2006–07 | Manitoba Moose | AHL | 77 | 35 | 46 | 81 | 75 | 13 | 6 | 7 | 13 | 6 |
| 2007–08 | Manitoba Moose | AHL | 43 | 21 | 27 | 48 | 51 | 3 | 1 | 4 | 5 | 0 |
| 2007–08 | Vancouver Canucks | NHL | 19 | 2 | 4 | 6 | 19 | — | — | — | — | — |
| 2008–09 | Manitoba Moose | AHL | 56 | 23 | 26 | 49 | 52 | 22 | 9 | 10 | 19 | 12 |
| 2008–09 | Vancouver Canucks | NHL | 14 | 2 | 2 | 4 | 14 | — | — | — | — | — |
| 2009–10 | Abbotsford Heat | AHL | 72 | 25 | 29 | 54 | 70 | 9 | 2 | 1 | 3 | 8 |
| 2009–10 | Calgary Flames | NHL | 3 | 0 | 0 | 0 | 0 | — | — | — | — | — |
| 2010–11 | Manitoba Moose | AHL | 6 | 1 | 1 | 2 | 2 | 14 | 3 | 6 | 9 | 6 |
| 2011–12 | St. John's IceCaps | AHL | 47 | 17 | 21 | 38 | 30 | — | — | — | — | — |
| 2011–12 | Winnipeg Jets | NHL | 13 | 0 | 1 | 1 | 7 | — | — | — | — | — |
| 2012–13 | St. John's IceCaps | AHL | 65 | 15 | 33 | 48 | 55 | — | — | — | — | — |
| 2013–14 | St. John's IceCaps | AHL | 76 | 18 | 41 | 59 | 48 | 20 | 4 | 8 | 12 | 32 |
| 2014–15 | St. John's IceCaps | AHL | 36 | 12 | 10 | 22 | 20 | — | — | — | — | — |
| 2015–16 | EHC München | DEL | 52 | 21 | 18 | 39 | 66 | 14 | 2 | 8 | 10 | 10 |
| 2016–17 | EHC München | DEL | 45 | 19 | 20 | 39 | 56 | 7 | 1 | 1 | 2 | 2 |
| 2017–18 | EHC München | DEL | 51 | 13 | 16 | 29 | 40 | 17 | 3 | 9 | 12 | 14 |
| 2018–19 | EHC München | DEL | 17 | 2 | 2 | 4 | 16 | — | — | — | — | — |
| 2019–20 | EHC München | DEL | 31 | 9 | 10 | 19 | 12 | — | — | — | — | — |
| AHL totals | | | 602 | 193 | 280 | 473 | 490 | 95 | 31 | 37 | 68 | 75 |
| DEL totals | | | 196 | 64 | 66 | 130 | 190 | 38 | 6 | 18 | 24 | 26 |
| NHL totals | | | 49 | 4 | 7 | 11 | 40 | — | — | — | — | — |

== Awards ==
ECHL

- Rookie of the Month - November and December 2002
- CCM Tacks Rookie of the Year - 2003
- First All-Star Team - 2003
- All-Rookie Team - 2003
- Player of the Week - December 29 – January 4 (2003–04)
- Second All-Star Team - 2004

AHL

- CCM Vector Player of the Week - October 30, 2006
- All-Star Classic - 2007
- Second All-Star Team - 2007

== Records ==
- Minnesota Moose/Manitoba Moose/St. John's IceCaps franchise record; most points, all-time - 321 (2004–present)
- Manitoba Moose franchise record; most goals, single game - 4 on October 24, 2006 (tied with Brandon Reid and Greg Pankewicz)
- Manitoba Moose franchise record; most game-winning goals, single-season - 9 (2006–07)
- Manitoba Moose franchise record; most powerplay goals, single-season - 16 (2006–07) (tied with Lee Goren and Scott Thomas, 1998–99)
- Manitoba Moose franchise record; most game-winning goals, all-time - 19 (2004–09)
- Manitoba Moose franchise record; most powerplay goals, all-time - 39 (2004–09)
- Manitoba Moose franchise record; highest plus-minus, all-time (2004–09)
