= The Dream Factory (Canadian nonprofit) =

- Founded: 1983
- Founder: Michelle Harrison and Linda Cameron-Turchet
- Headquarters: Winnipeg, Manitoba, Canada
- Region served: Manitoba
- Services: Children 3–18 years old with terminal illnesses
- Website: https://www.thedreamfactory.ca

The Dream Factory is a Canadian nonprofit organization dedicated to helping terminally-ill children and their families by providing financial and emotional support. The foundation grants wishes for the kids within the program, stating that their goal is to remind families that joy can be found in difficult situations.

== History and profile ==
The organization was founded in 1983 by Michelle Harrison and Linda Cameron-Turchet under the name The Rainbow Society. They later rebranded to The Dream Factory in 2011.

The operation has grown significantly since its conception. On February 9, 2025, they moved their headquarters to a new location. The space is intended to be used as a community resource where children can spend time away from the hospital. There is a kitchen with snacks, some games and crafts for children to use and playful architectural features to give the place a welcoming atmosphere.

As of 2026, the organization has fulfilled over 1,000 wishes for children with terminal-illnesses. On average, families receive support from the foundation for 5–7 years. Financial aid is a large part of what The Dream Factory offers. In 2024, the organization distributed just under $200,000. In addition, they have made a commitment to giving each new family $3,000 to provide financial stress relief. This amount is given through gift cards to grocery stores, gas stations and local restaurants. There are also five monthly hospital parking passes available.

== Local support ==
As an independent charity, The Dream Factory relies on sponsors to fund operations and events. They encourage volunteers to staff these events and have had over 1,200 participants. The Dream Factory has put on a number of fundraising events and hosts many other community functions throughout the year.

The organization has received lots of support from local businesses and professional sports teams. Josh Morrissey, a member of the Winnipeg Jets is an ambassador for The Dream Factory and has an annual golf tournament in his name which has been running for 9 years.

== Michelle Harrison ==
Co-founder of The Dream Factory, Michelle Harrison was born September 4, 1958, in Edmonton, Alberta. She settled in Winnipeg and got involved with charity work in the community, eventually establishing a foundation in 1983, what would now be known as The Dream Factory. She remained involved in other nonprofits and organizations throughout her life, Big Brothers Big Sisters of Winnipeg, Camp Manitou, and The Kinsmen Reh-fit Centre to name a few.

In December, 2023 she shared news of her terminal lung cancer diagnosis. Harrison decided to commit the last of her life to a ‘living memorial’, dedicated to raising money for The Dream Factory. Harrison passed away April 17, 2024.
