= Keith McCambridge =

Canadian ice hockey player and coach

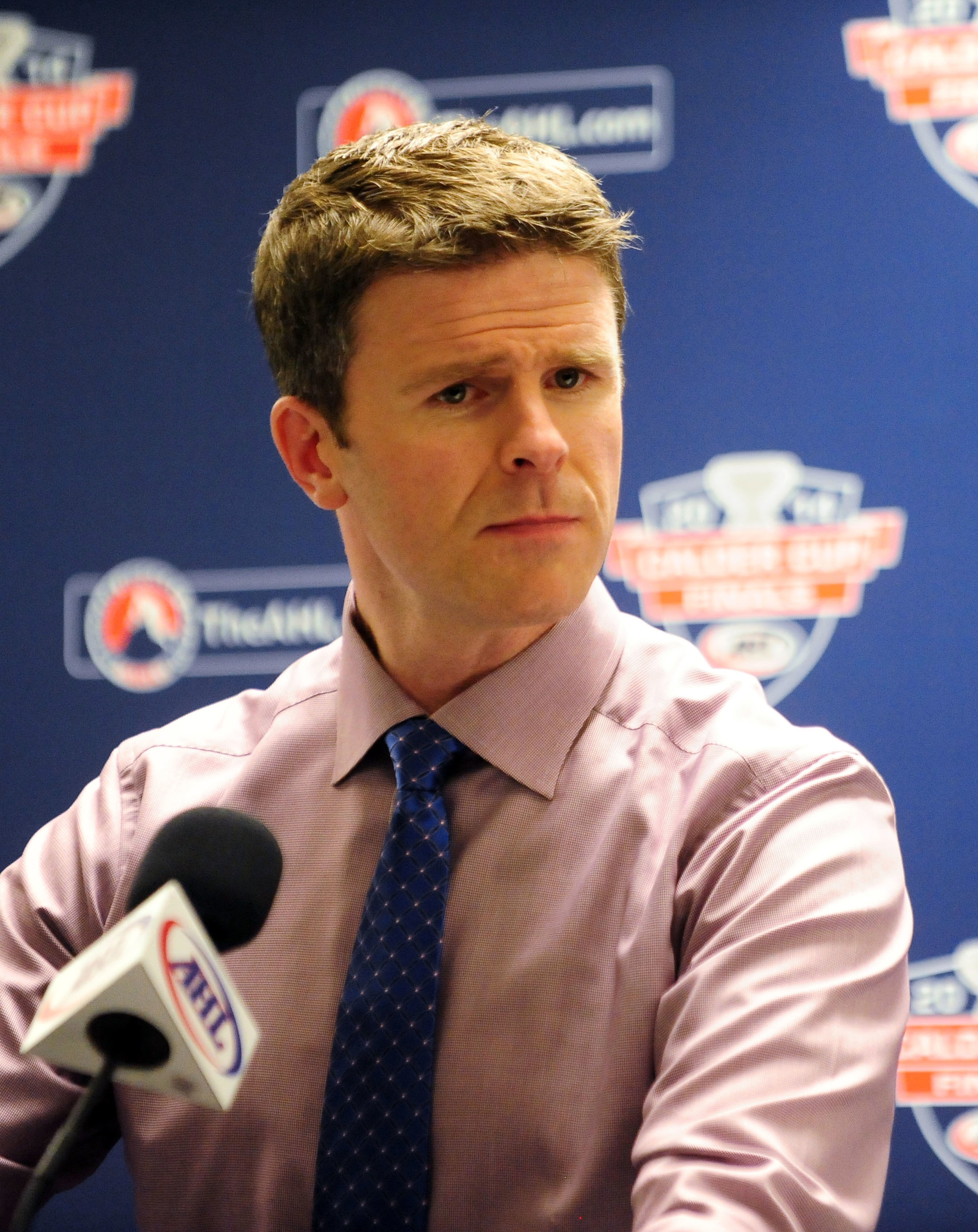
- McCambridge in 2014
- Born: February 1, 1974 (age 52) Thompson, Manitoba, Canada
- Height: 6 ft 2 in (188 cm)
- Weight: 205 lb (93 kg; 14 st 9 lb)
- Position: Defence
- Shot: Left
- Played for: Saint John Flames; Las Vegas Thunder; Long Beach Ice Dogs; Providence Bruins; Manitoba Moose; Houston Aeros; Cleveland Barons; Alaska Aces
- NHL draft: 201st overall, 1994; Calgary Flames
- Playing career: 1995–2006

Keith McCambridge (born February 1, 1974) is a Canadian professional ice hockey coach and a former defenceman. He was previously the head coach of the American Hockey League's Manitoba Moose/St. John's IceCaps team from 2011 to 2016 and the Hartford Wolf Pack from 2017 to 2019.

== Playing career ==
McCambridge was born in Thompson, Manitoba, but grew up in Selkirk. He joined the Selkirk Steelers of the Manitoba Junior Hockey League as a 16-year-old, playing one season before moving on to the Swift Current Broncos of the Western Hockey League, where he spent most of his major junior career. During his final season of junior hockey, McCambridge was traded to the Kamloops Blazers, joining them on their 1995 Memorial Cup championship run.

McCambridge was drafted in the eighth round, 201st overall by the Calgary Flames in the 1994 NHL entry draft. After junior, he spent three seasons with the Saint John Flames, Calgary's AHL affiliate, from 1995 to 1998. He later went on to play for several teams in both the American and the International Hockey leagues, including the Las Vegas Thunder, Providence Bruins, Long Beach Ice Dogs, and Cleveland Barons. Known for his tough, bruising style of play, McCambridge recorded 42 points and 1333 penalty minutes in 461 regular season games, AHL and IHL combined. He also played in 40 playoff games.

In 2003, McCambridge signed as a player-coach with the Alaska Aces of the ECHL. He spent three seasons with the Aces, as a captain wearing the number 2, and was a part of their 2006 Kelly Cup championship team. McCambridge retired as a player following the Aces' championship season.

== Coaching career ==
After retiring a player, McCambridge became a full-time assistant coach for Aces in 2006 and was promoted to head coach a year later. The Aces enjoyed two successful seasons under McCambridge's guidance and advanced to the finals in 2008-2009.

In 2009, McCambridge joined the American Hockey League's Manitoba Moose as an assistant coach and later moved with the team to St. John's, Newfoundland and Labrador in 2011. The Winnipeg Jets, the parent club of the St. John's IceCaps, subsequently selected McCambridge to replace Claude Noël as head coach. McCambridge led the IceCaps to a division title in 2011–12 and a berth in the 2014 Calder Cup finals, which they lost to the Texas Stars in five games.

McCambridge was retained as head coach when the franchise relocated back to Winnipeg as the Moose in 2015. After one season back in Manitoba, McCambridge's contract was not renewed by the Jets' organization. He was hired as an assistant coach by the Hartford Wolf Pack in August 2016.

On June 12, 2017, McCambridge was named Wolf Pack head coach for the 2017–18 AHL season. He was fired after two seasons.

McCambridge was hired as an Associate Coach by the Vancouver Giants of the WHL in 2020 and served in that capacity for two seasons. He has been hired by the Bakersfield Condors of the American Hockey League as an Assistant Coach.

== Career statistics ==
			Regular season					Playoffs
Season	Team	League	GP	G	A	Pts	PIM	GP	G	A	Pts	PIM
1991–92	Swift Current Broncos	WHL	72	1	4	5	94	8	0	0	0	2
1992–93	Swift Current Broncos	WHL	70	0	6	6	87	17	0	1	1	27
1993–94	Swift Current Broncos	WHL	71	0	10	10	179	7	0	0	0	4
1994–95	Swift Current Broncos	WHL	48	5	7	12	120	—	—	—	—	—
1994–95	Kamloops Blazers	WHL	21	0	6	6	90	21	0	5	5	49
1995–96	Saint John Flames	AHL	48	1	3	4	89	16	0	0	0	6
1996–97	Saint John Flames	AHL	56	2	1	3	109	—	—	—	—	—
1997–98	Saint John Flames	AHL	56	4	4	8	118	—	—	—	—	—
1997–98	Las Vegas Thunder	IHL	10	0	1	1	16	4	0	0	0	9
1998–99	Las Vegas Thunder	IHL	18	1	2	3	56	—	—	—	—	—
1998–99	Long Beach Ice Dogs	IHL	52	2	5	7	200	8	0	0	0	20
1999–00	Providence Bruins	AHL	47	0	2	2	135	—	—	—	—	—
1999–00	Manitoba Moose	IHL	3	0	1	1	4	—	—	—	—	—
2000–01	Providence Bruins	AHL	63	1	5	6	215	10	0	0	0	18
2001–02	Providence Bruins	AHL	59	1	3	4	263	2	0	0	0	5
2002–03	Houston Aeros	AHL	11	0	0	0	22	—	—	—	—	—
2002–03	Cleveland Barons	AHL	38	0	3	3	106	—	—	—	—	—
2003–04	Alaska Aces	ECHL	63	1	5	6	171	6	1	1	2	2
2004–05	Alaska Aces	ECHL	56	3	8	11	111	15	0	4	4	12
2005–06	Alaska Aces	ECHL	47	1	3	4	93	22	0	4	4	16
AHL totals			378	9	21	30	1,057	28	0	0	0	29

== Coaching record ==
Team	Year	League	Regular season							Postseason
Team	Year	League	G	W	L	T	OTL	Pts	Finish	Result
AK	2007–08	ECHL	72	41	26	-	5	87	3rd in West	Lost in Second Round (LV)
AK	2008–09	ECHL	72	45	24	1	2	93	1st in West	Lost in Kelly Cup Finals (SC)
STJ	2011–12	AHL	76	43	25	-	8	94	1st in Atlantic	Lost in Third Round (NOR)
STJ	2012–13	AHL	76	32	36	-	8	72	5th in Atlantic	Did not qualify
STJ	2013–14	AHL	76	46	23	-	7	99	2nd in Atlantic	Lost in Calder Cup Finals (TEX)
STJ	2014–15	AHL	76	32	33	-	11	75	5th in Atlantic	Did not qualify
MAN	2015–16	AHL	76	26	41	-	9	61	7th in Central	Did not qualify
HFD	2017–18	AHL	76	34	33	-	9	77	6th in Atlantic	Did not qualify
HFD	2018–19	AHL	76	29	36	-	11	69	8th in Atlantic	Did not qualify
ECHL Totals			144	86	50	1	7	180		
AHL Totals			532	242	227	-	63	547		

Sporting positions
Preceded by Claude Noel	Head coach of the Manitoba Moose; 2011–2016	Succeeded by Pascal Vincent
Preceded by Ken Gernander	Head coach of the Hartford Wolf Pack; 2017–2019	Succeeded by Kris Knoblauch
