= Manitoba Moose =

American Hockey League team in Winnipeg, Manitoba

- City: Winnipeg, Manitoba
- League: American Hockey League
- Conference: Western
- Division: Central
- Founded: 1994 (IHL)
- Home arena: Canada Life Centre
- Colours: Polar Night blue, aviator blue, silver, white
- Owner: True North Sports & Entertainment
- General manager: Craig Heisinger
- Head coach: Mark Morrison
- Captain: Vacant
- Media: 680 CJOB; AHLTV (Internet)
- Affiliates: Winnipeg Jets (NHL); Bloomington Bison (ECHL)
- Website: MooseHockey.com

Franchise history
- 1994–1996: Minnesota Moose
- 1996–2011: Manitoba Moose
- 2011–2015: St. John's IceCaps
- 2015–present: Manitoba Moose

Championships
- Regular season titles: 1 (2008–09)
- Division titles: 2 (2006–07), (2008–09)
- Conference titles: 1 (2008–09)

The Manitoba Moose are a professional ice hockey team based in Winnipeg. They are the American Hockey League (AHL) affiliate of the Winnipeg Jets of the National Hockey League (NHL). The team plays its home games at Canada Life Centre.

The franchise was founded in 1994 as the Minnesota Moose, then playing in the International Hockey League (IHL). The Moose played fifteen seasons—five in the IHL (1996–2001) and ten in the AHL (2001–2011)—during their first tenure in Winnipeg. This was followed by four seasons in St. John's, Newfoundland and Labrador, (2011–2015) during which the team was known as the St. John's IceCaps. The team returned to Winnipeg prior to the 2015–16 season.

== History ==
=== International Hockey League (1996–2001) ===
Following the departure of the original Winnipeg Jets franchise to Phoenix in 1996, a group of local businessmen, including Mark Chipman, purchased the Minnesota Moose of the IHL. The team was relocated to Winnipeg to provide a new tenant for the Winnipeg Arena and keep professional hockey in the city.

The team's first season in Winnipeg was a disaster. Former Montreal Canadiens coach Jean Perron was brought in to replace Frank Serratore as head coach and general manager. The Moose won only 16 of 50 games under Perron before he was fired from both positions on January 4, 1997. Upon his dismissal, Perron lashed out at team ownership, the media, and the players, including a personal attack on team captain Randy Gilhen. Perron threatened legal action against the organization though no lawsuit was ever filed. Assistant coach Randy Carlyle took over as interim head coach for the remainder of the season and led the team to a winning record in their final 32 games of the season, but it was not enough to qualify for the playoffs.

Carlyle served as the head coach and general manager for team's final four seasons in the IHL. The Moose had moderate regular season success and qualified for the Turner Cup playoffs three times, making it as far as the second round. Carlyle was named the league's General Manager of the Year for the 1998–99 season. The Moose remained an independent club while playing in the IHL, electing not to affiliate with an NHL team.

=== American Hockey League (2001–present) ===
==== 2001–2011: Move to the AHL ====
The Moose and five other IHL clubs were accepted into the AHL upon the former's demise in 2001, and the team became the top affiliate of the Vancouver Canucks. This partnership lasted until the NHL's return to Winnipeg in 2011. Former Canucks star Stan Smyl was chosen by the Canucks as the new head coach of the Moose while Carlyle stayed on as general manager for one season before leaving to join the Washington Capitals coaching staff. In 2002–03, Smyl led the team to the second round of the Calder Cup playoffs, but lost to the Hamilton Bulldogs in seven games. After the team missed the playoffs the following season, Smyl was reassigned within the Canucks organization.

Following the departure of Smyl, Carlyle returned as head coach for the 2004–05 season. It was a season of big changes and new heights of success for the organization. The Manitoba Moose Hockey Club, now owned by True North Sports & Entertainment, played its final game at the old Winnipeg Arena and moved into the brand new MTS Centre (since renamed Bell MTS Place and now Canada Life Centre). The Moose advanced as far as the conference final for the first time in team history but were swept in four games by their old IHL rivals, the Chicago Wolves. Mark Chipman was awarded the James C. Hendy Memorial Award for AHL Executive of the Year. After the season, Carlyle was hired by the Anaheim Ducks as their new head coach, becoming the first of four consecutive Moose head coaches to leave the team for head coaching positions in the NHL.

Former Canadiens head coach Alain Vigneault was hired by the Vancouver Canucks as the new Moose head coach for the 2005–06 season. Winnipeg native and three-time Stanley Cup champion Mike Keane also joined the club as their new team captain. Keane quickly became a fan favourite and the team had another great year, but again lost in the second round of the playoffs. After the season, Vigneault was promoted by the Canucks to fill their vacant head coaching position when Marc Crawford was dismissed.

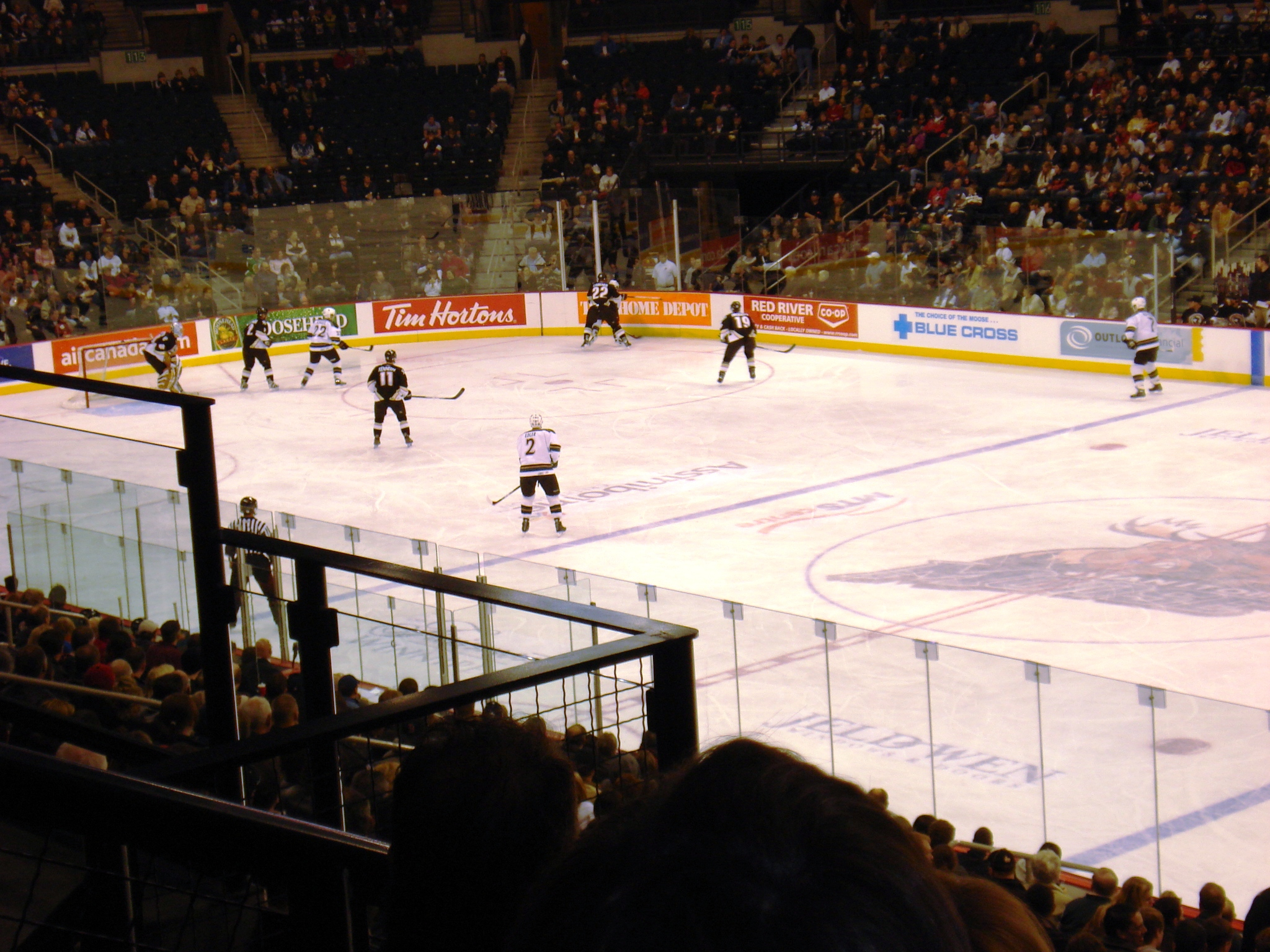
A Moose game at the then-MTS Centre in 2006

Former Moose captain and assistant coach Scott Arniel was selected to replace Vigneault. Arniel coached the team for four seasons and, in 2008–09, led them to their best season in franchise history when the team finished with 107 points, the best record in the league. In the second round of the 2009 Calder Cup Playoffs, the Moose completed their first playoff sweep in franchise history, defeating the Grand Rapids Griffins. After beating the Houston Aeros in six games to win the Western Conference final, the Moose advanced to the Calder Cup finals for the first time, but lost the championship series in six games to the Hershey Bears. Arniel was awarded the Louis A. R. Pieri Memorial Award as the AHL Coach of the Year, while general manager Craig Heisinger became the second member of the Moose front office staff to win the James C. Hendy Memorial Award.

Arniel became the third Moose coach in six years to make the jump to the NHL when he was hired by the Columbus Blue Jackets as their new head coach in 2010. Ironically, Arniel was replaced by the person he replaced in Columbus, Claude Noël. During the same off-season, Keane's contract was not renewed and his #12 jersey was later retired on Mike Keane Tribute Night, February 12, 2011. During the 2011 playoffs, the Moose came back from a three games to one deficit to the Lake Erie Monsters in the first round to advance. They fell behind three games to one again in round two, this time to the Hamilton Bulldogs, and came back to force a seventh game. However, the Bulldogs took the series with a 2–1 win in triple overtime in the longest Game 7 in AHL history.

During their first tenure in the AHL, the Moose were one of the league's most successful franchises. Home game attendance was consistently among the best in the league, including an average of 8,404 per game during the 2010–2011 season. The organization was also popular with the players, as the Moose "had the reputation of being run like an NHL club". League president and CEO David Andrews called the Moose "a flagship franchise for the AHL".

==== 2011–2015: St. John's IceCaps ====
On May 31, 2011, Mark Chipman announced True North Sports and Entertainment's acquisition of the NHL's Atlanta Thrashers with the intent of relocating the team to Winnipeg for the 2011–12 season. The return of NHL hockey to the city prompted the organization to find a new home for the AHL franchise. A deal with former Premier of Newfoundland and Labrador Danny Williams was quickly negotiated to relocate the team to St. John's, Newfoundland and Labrador and swiftly approved by the AHL Board of Governors. The Moose brand was dropped in consideration of Newfoundland's history of fatal vehicle collisions involving the titanical animal; instead, the team was renamed the St. John's IceCaps. The IceCaps were then named new AHL affiliate of the Winnipeg Jets, ending the AHL team's ten-year affiliation with the Vancouver Canucks.

The success of the franchise continued in St. John's. Attendance at Mile One Centre was strong; the IceCaps enjoyed the second longest home sellout streak in league history at 120 games between 2011 and 2014. In 2011–12, the IceCaps won their division and advanced as far as the conference final. In 2013–14, the IceCaps advanced to the Calder Cup finals for the second time in franchise history, but lost to the Texas Stars in five games.

==== 2015–present: Return to Manitoba ====
As early as January 2014, True North Sports and Entertainment confirmed intentions to move its AHL franchise closer to Winnipeg, with Thunder Bay, Ontario as the preferred destination. Although the agreement with Williams' group had been extended through 2016, the two sides terminated the deal after Williams negotiated an agreement to bring the Montreal Canadiens AHL affiliate, Hamilton Bulldogs, to St. John's for the 2015–16 season. The IceCaps' trademarks were retained by Williams' group and transferred to the incoming franchise.

As a new arena in Thunder Bay was not forthcoming, True North Sports and Entertainment's AHL franchise returned to Winnipeg for the 2015–16 season and once again became the Manitoba Moose Hockey Club. Slight changes to the former logo were unveiled, as well as a new colour scheme similar to that of the Jets. Keith McCambridge, who had been with the franchise since 2009, remained as head coach.

After one season in Manitoba and missing the playoffs for the second straight season, McCambridge was released by the organization and replaced by Jets assistant coach Pascal Vincent. The Moose missed the playoffs again in Vincent's first season, but a much improved performance during the 2017–18 season returned the Moose to playoffs again. Vincent was awarded the Louis A.R. Pieri Memorial Award for AHL coach of the year, while players Sami Niku and Mason Appleton also captured major awards. Vincent stepped down as head coach following the shortened 2020–21 season and was replaced by Mark Morrison, who was previously an assistant coach with the team from 2011 to 2017.

== Team information ==
=== Logos and uniforms ===
Logo from 2004-2011

The current Manitoba Moose uniforms are similar to those of the Winnipeg Jets, whose colours are polar night blue, aviator blue, silver, and white. However, unlike the Jets, the Moose wear their white uniforms for home games in accordance with AHL rules. During their IHL days, the Moose colours were purple, green, and copper. The team switched to teal, copper, and black after joining the AHL.

The original Minnesota Moose logo, depicting a Moose holding a hockey stick, was carried over when the team moved from Minnesota in 1996. The logo was slightly altered in 2001 to match the team's new colour scheme. A new logo created by Milwaukee-based graphic designer David Mann was introduced in 2004 (coinciding with the team's move from Winnipeg Arena to MTS Centre), which the team used until 2011. The Moose returned to a similar logo upon returning to the AHL in 2015, albeit with an altered colour scheme and other slight changes in order to conform with the Winnipeg Jets brand.

=== Mascot ===
Mick E. Moose debuted as the mascot of the Manitoba Moose in 1996. The Winnipeg Jets "recalled" him from the AHL in 2011 to become their mascot following the departure of the Moose to St. John's. He has served as the official mascot for both teams since 2015. Aside from hockey games, Mick E. Moose makes approximately 100 public appearances each year at various community events.

=== Media ===
680 CJOB airs select Moose games on radio and streams all games on the internet. Daniel Fink is the team's Manager of Hockey Communications and play-by-play broadcaster. Fink began calling Moose games in 2019, taking over from Mitch Peacock (2015-2019). TSN Radio 1290 (CFRW) held broadcasting rights from 2015 to 2020. CJOB previously held radio broadcast rights from 1996 to 2011, with Kelly Moore (1996–2006) and Brian Munz (2006–2011) as play-by-play announcers.

CKY-TV previously televised select Moose games from 1996 to 1999, and A-Channel aired select games during the 2000-01 season. For the 2022 Calder Cup playoffs, home playoff games were televised on TSN.

=== Venue ===
The Manitoba Moose play their home games at Canada Life Centre (previously the MTS Centre and Bell MTS Place), which they share with the Winnipeg Jets, and are currently one of two AHL clubs (the other being the Calgary Wranglers) to share a home arena with its NHL parent club. Although the arena seats 15,321 for hockey, only the lower bowl (which seats 8,812) is open for most Moose games. Practices and training sessions are usually held at Hockey for All Centre. The Moose briefly relocated to the Hockey for All Centre from March to May 2021 when COVID-19 pandemic protocols made the regular home arena unsuitable for hosting multiple clubs.

The team played at the Winnipeg Arena prior to the opening of Canada Life Centre in November 2004.

== Season-by-season results ==
Regular season											Playoffs					
Season	Games	Won	Lost	Tied	OTL	SOL	Points	Goals for	Goals against	Standing	Year	Prelim	1st round	2nd round	3rd round	Finals
1996–97	82	32	40	—	10	—	74	262	300	5th, Midwest	1997	—	Did not qualify			
1997–98	82	39	36	—	7	—	85	269	254	4th, Northwest	1998	—	L, 0–3, CHI	—	—	—
1998–99	82	47	21	—	14	—	108	269	236	2nd, Midwest	1999	—	W, 2–0, MIL	L, 0–3, CHI	—	—
1999–00	82	37	31	—	14	—	88	227	237	5th, West	2000	—	L, 0–2, LB	—	—	—
2000–01	82	39	31	—	12	—	90	222	230	3rd, West	2001	—		W, 4–3, HOU	L, 2–4, CHI	—
2001–02	80	39	33	4	4	—	86	270	260	4th, Canadian	2002	W, 2–1, WOR	L, 1–3, BRI	—	—	—
2002–03	80	37	33	8	2	—	84	229	228	2nd, Canadian	2003	W, 2–1, POR	W, 3–1, PRO	L, 3–4, HAM	—	—
2003–04	80	32	35	11	2	—	77	214	232	6th, North	2004	Did not qualify				
2004–05	80	44	26	—	7	3	98	243	210	3rd, North	2005	—	W, 4–1, STJ	W, 4–1, RCH	L, 0–4, CHI	—
2005–06	80	44	24	—	7	5	100	243	217	3rd, North	2006	—	W, 4–2, SYR	L, 3–4, GR	—	—
2006–07	80	45	23	—	7	5	102	232	201	1st, North	2007	—	W, 4–3, GR	L, 2–4, HAM	—	—
2007–08	80	46	27	—	3	4	99	236	197	3rd, North	2008	—	L, 2–4, SYR	—	—	—
2008–09	80	50	23	—	1	6	107	230	177	1st, League	2009	—	W, 4–2, TOR	W, 4–0, GR	W, 4–2, HOU	L, 2–4, HER
2009–10	80	40	33	—	5	2	87	204	232	4th North	2010	—	L, 2–4, HAM	—	—	—
2010–11	80	43	30	—	1	6	93	220	210	3rd, North	2011	—	W, 4–3, LEM	L, 3–4, HAM	—	—
2011–2015	Played as St. John's IceCaps															
2015–16	76	26	41	—	4	5	61	180	250	7th, Central	2016	—	Did not qualify			
2016–17	76	29	37	—	5	5	68	197	242	7th, Central	2017	—	Did not qualify			
2017–18	76	42	26	—	4	4	92	253	198	3rd, Central	2018	—	W, 3–2, GR	L, 0–4, RFD	—	—
2018–19	76	39	30	—	5	2	85	197	219	5th, Central	2019	—	Did not qualify			
2019–20	61	27	33	—	1	0	55	160	190	8th, Central	2020	—	Season cancelled due to the COVID-19 pandemic			
2020–21	36	18	13	—	3	2	41	109	102	2nd, Canadian	2021	—	No playoffs were held			
2021–22	72	41	24	—	5	2	89	228	204	2nd, Central	2022	BYE	L, 2–3, MIL	—	—	—
2022–23	72	37	25	—	6	4	84	227	226	3rd, Central	2023	BYE	L, 2–3, MIL	—	—	—
2023–24	72	34	35	—	2	1	71	225	243	5th, Central	2024	L, 0–2, TEX	—	—	—	—
2024–25	72	25	41	—	3	3	56	169	248	7th, Central	2025	Did not qualify				
2025–26	72	35	29	—	5	3	78	185	216	4th, Central	2026	W, 2–1, MIL	L, 1–3, GR	—	—	—

== Players ==
=== Current roster ===
Updated November 18, 2026.

No.	Nat	Player	Pos	S/G	Age	Acquired	Birthplace	Contract
39	(Canada)	Colby Barlow	LW	L	21	2025	Orillia, Ontario	Jets
4	(Canada)	Dawson Barteaux	D	R	26	2023	Foxwarren, Manitoba	Moose
59	(United States)	Garrett Brown	D	R	22	2026	San Jose, California	Jets
23	(United States)	Davis Burnside	F	R	23	2026	La Grange, Illinois	Moose
19	(Russia)	Nikita Chibrikov	RW	L	23	2023	Moscow, Russia	Jets
50	(Canada)	Domenic DiVincentiis	G	L	22	2024	Bolton, Ontario	Jets
7	(United States)	Walker Duehr	RW	R	28	2025	Sioux Falls, South Dakota	Jets
20	(Canada)	Tyson Empey (A)	F	L	31	2024	Swift Current, Saskatchewan	Moose
25	(United States)	Parker Ford (A)	C	R	26	2023	Wakefield, Rhode Island	Jets
34	(Sweden)	Alfons Freij	D	L	20	2026	Sölvesborg, Sweden	Jets
18	(Canada)	Noah Gregor (A)	C	L	28	2026	Edmonton, Alberta	Jets
5	(United States)	Lukas Gustafsson	D	L	23	2026	Alpharetta, Georgia	Moose
10	(Canada)	Kevin He	LW	L	20	2026	Beijing, China	Jets
24	(Canada)	Jacob Julien	C	L	22	2025	London, Ontario	Jets
13	(Finland)	Brad Lambert	C	R	22	2022	Lahti, Finland	Jets
52	(Canada)	Jack Matier (PTO)	D	R	23	2026	Sault Ste. Marie, Ontario	Moose
37	(Canada)	Dysin Mayo	D	R	30	2026	Victoria, British Columbia	Moose
32	(Canada)	Thomas Milic	G	L	23	2023	New Westminster, British Columbia	Jets
27	(Canada)	Michael Milne	LW	L	24	2026	Abbotsford, British Columbia	Moose
28	(Canada)	Evan Nause	D	L	23	2026	White Rock, British Columbia	Moose
3	(Canada)	Isaak Phillips (A)	D	L	25	2025	Barrie, Ontario	Jets
6	(Canada)	Ashton Sautner (A)	D	L	32	2022	Flin Flon, Manitoba	Moose
26	(Sweden)	Fabian Wagner	C	L	22	2024	Nyköping, Sweden	Jets
33	(United States)	Lucas Wahlin	RW	R	25	2026	Woodbury, Minnesota	Jets
22	(Canada)	Kieron Walton	C	L	20	2026	Toronto, Ontario	Jets
48	(United States)	Chase Yoder	C	L	24	2025	Fairview, Texas	Moose

=== Team captains ===
- Randy Gilhen, 1996–1997
- Scott Arniel, 1997–1999
- Brian Chapman, 1999–2003
- Dallas Eakins, 2003–2004
- Nolan Baumgartner, 2004–2005, 2010–2011
- Mike Keane, 2005–2010
- John Albert, 2015–2016
- Patrice Cormier, 2016–2018
- Peter Stoykewych, 2018–2020
- Jimmy Oligny, 2021–2024
- Dominic Toninato, 2024–2025
- Mason Shaw, 2025–2026

=== American Hockey League Hall of Famers ===
AHL Hall of Fame Honored Members
Name	Seasons	Induction Year
Nolan Baumgartner	2002-05, 2007-11 (player); 2022-24 (asst. coach)	2022
Bryan Helmer	2001-03 (player)	2017

=== Retired numbers ===
Manitoba Moose retired numbers
No.	Player	Position	Career	No. retirement
12	Mike Keane	RW	2005–2010	February 12, 2011
21	Jimmy Roy	LW	1997–2006	February 7, 2020

Although not officially retired, the team has not issued jersey number 11 since 2012 in honour of former player Rick Rypien, who died shortly after signing with the Winnipeg Jets in 2011. The Moose and Jets also wear #11 decals on their helmets as part of the organization's Project11 campaign for mental health awareness.

=== Head coaches ===
- Jean Perron, 1996–1997
- Randy Carlyle, 1997–2001, 2004–2005
- Stan Smyl, 2001–2004
- Alain Vigneault, 2005–2006
- Scott Arniel, 2006–2010
- Claude Noel, 2010–2011
- Keith McCambridge, 2015–2016
- Pascal Vincent, 2016–2021
- Mark Morrison, 2021–present

=== Notable alumni ===
The following players have played both 100 games for the Moose and 100 games in the National Hockey League:

- Mason Appleton
- Scott Arniel
- Alex Auld
- Nolan Baumgartner
- Kevin Bieksa
- Fred Brathwaite
- Mike Brown
- Alexandre Burrows
- Wade Flaherty
- Randy Gilhen
- Michael Grabner
- Josh Green
- Jannik Hansen
- Mike Keane
- Ryan Kesler
- Johnathan Kovacevic
- Brendan Lemieux
- Nic Petan
- Sean Pronger
- Rick Rypien
- Cory Schneider
- Logan Stanley

== Team records ==
Single season
Goals: 45 Scott Thomas (1998–99)
Assists: 81 Stephane Morin (1994–95)
Points: 114 Stephane Morin (1994–95)
Penalty minutes: 285 Wade Brookbank (2004–05)
Wins: 35 Cory Schneider (2009–10)
GAA: 2.04 Cory Schneider (2008–09)
SV%: .935 Michael Hutchinson (2017–18)

Career
Career goals: 158 Jason Jaffray
Career assists: 244 Jason Jaffray
Career points: 402 Jason Jaffray
Career penalty minutes: 1434 Jimmy Roy
Career goaltending wins: 84 Cory Schneider
Career shutouts: 12 Cory Schneider
Career games: 603 Jimmy Roy

=== Team scoring leaders ===
These are the top-ten point-scorers in team history. Figures are updated after each completed regular season.

Note: Pos = Position; GP = Games Played; G = Goals; A = Assists; Pts = Points; P/G = Points per game; = current Moose player

Points
Player	Pos	GP	G	A	Pts	P/G
Jason Jaffray	LW	493	158	244	402	0.82
Brett Hauer	D	322	58	193	251	0.78
JC Lipon	RW	452	80	142	222	0.49
Nolan Baumgartner	D	451	45	169	214	0.47
Jimmy Roy	LW	603	101	111	212	0.35
Stephane Morin	F	173	63	138	201	1.16
Bill Bowler	C	187	55	134	189	1.01
Brandon Reid	C	259	70	111	181	0.70
Lee Goren	RW	193	80	91	171	0.89
Scott Arniel	F	222	67	104	171	0.77

== Team general managers ==
- Jean Perron, 1996–97 (fired 50 games into first season)
- Randy Carlyle, 1997–2002 (became Washington Capitals assistant coach)
- Craig Heisinger, 2002–present (held position with franchise in St. John's from 2011 to 2015)

== See also ==
- List of ice hockey teams in Manitoba
