= Minnesota Moose =

- City: St. Paul, Minnesota
- League: International Hockey League
- Conference: Western Conference
- Division: Midwest Division
- Operated: 1994–1996
- Home arena: Saint Paul Civic Center
- Colors: Green, Purple, Black, Copper
- Affiliates: Independent

Franchise history
- 1994–1996: Minnesota Moose
- 1996–2011: Manitoba Moose
- 2011–2015: St. John's IceCaps
- 2015–present: Manitoba Moose

The Minnesota Moose were an American professional ice hockey team based out of Saint Paul, Minnesota that played in the International Hockey League from 1994 to 1996.

== History ==
Following the departure of the National Hockey League's Minnesota North Stars in 1993, the state of Minnesota was left without a professional hockey team. To fill that void, the Minnesota Moose were founded the following year. The team began play in the IHL for the 1994–1995 season, using the Saint Paul Civic Center at its home arena, with some games in Minneapolis's Target Center.

After two years in the Twin Cities, the team was sold to a group of Canadian businessmen including Mark Chipman, who relocated the team to Winnipeg, Manitoba, and renamed them the Manitoba Moose. The franchise has played in the American Hockey League since the demise of the IHL in 2001 and is now the top minor league affiliate of the Winnipeg Jets, sharing the Canada Life Centre. The state of Minnesota welcomed a new NHL team, the Minnesota Wild, in 2000. The Wild play at Grand Casino Arena, located on the site of the old Civic Center in St. Paul.

== Season-by-season results ==
Season	Games	Won	Lost	OTL	Points	Goals for	Goals against	Standing	Prelim	1st round	2nd round	3rd round	Finals
1994–95	81	34	35	12	80	271	336	4th, Central	—	L, 0–3, Denver	—	—	—
1995–96	82	30	45	7	67	254	322	5th, Midwest	Out of playoffs.				

== Team records ==
Goals: 38 Dave Christian (1994–95)
Assists: 81 Stephane Morin (1994–95)
Points: 114 Stephane Morin (1994–95)
Penalty minutes: 181 Brad Miller (1994–95)
GAA: 3.31 Parris Duffus (1995–96)
SV%: .895 Parris Duffus (1995–96)
Career goals: 60 Stephane Morin
Career assists: 132 Stephane Morin
Career points: 192 Stephane Morin
Career penalty minutes: 351 Brad Miller
Career goaltending wins: 25 Tom Draper
Career shutouts: 1 Tom Draper, Parris Duffus
Career games: 161 Stephane Morin

== Head coaches ==
- (United States) Frank Serratore (1994–1996)
