= Canada Life Centre =

Indoor arena in Winnipeg, Manitoba, Canada

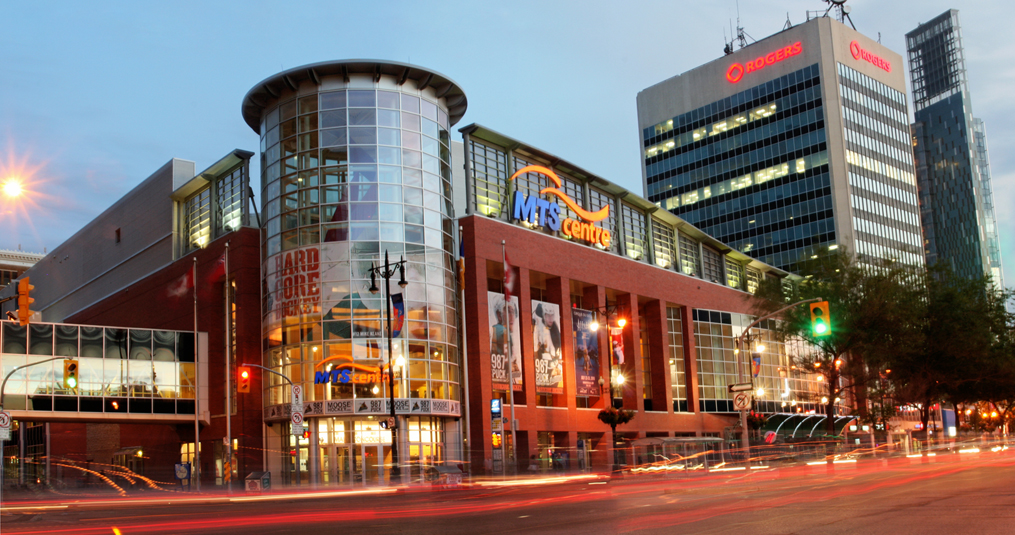
- Canada Life Centre as the MTS Centre in 2010

- Location in Canada Location in Manitoba
- Former names: True North Centre (planning/construction); MTS Centre (2004–2017); Bell MTS Place (2017–2021)
- Address: 300 Portage Avenue
- Location: Winnipeg, Manitoba, Canada
- Coordinates: 49°53′34″N 97°8′37″W
- Elevation: 236 m (774 ft) AMSL
- Owner: True North Sports & Entertainment
- Operator: True North Sports & Entertainment
- Capacity: Concerts: 16,345; Ice hockey: 8,812–15,225
- Surface: Ice
- Record attendance: 17,000 (2018 Metallica concert)
- Public transit: Winnipeg Transit; BLUE FX4 F5 F7 F8

Construction
- Groundbreaking: April 16, 2003
- Built: April 2003 – November 2004
- Opened: November 16, 2004
- Cost: C$133.5 million ($213 million in 2025)
- Architects: Sink Combs Dethlefs; Number TEN Architectural Group; Smith Carter
- Project manager: Hammes Company
- Structural engineers: Martin/Martin, Inc. / Crosier Kilgour
- Services engineer: M*E/MCW-AGE
- General contractor: PCL Constructors Canada

Tenants
- Winnipeg Jets (NHL) (2011–present); Manitoba Moose (AHL) (2004–2011, 2015–present); Winnipeg Sea Bears (CEBL) (2023–present); Winnipeg Ice (WHL) (2023)

Website
- canadalifecentre.ca

Canada Life Centre (formerly Bell MTS Place and originally MTS Centre) is a multi-purpose indoor arena in downtown Winnipeg, Manitoba, Canada. It is the home of the NHL's Winnipeg Jets and their AHL affiliate the Manitoba Moose, as well as the CEBL's Winnipeg Sea Bears.

The arena stands on the site of the former Eaton's Winnipeg store, and is owned and operated by True North Sports & Entertainment. The 440,000-square-foot (41,000 m^{2}) building was constructed at a cost of C$133.5 million. Opened as on November 16, 2004, it replaced the since-demolished Winnipeg Arena. The seating capacity is 15,225 for hockey games and 16,345 for concerts.

== History ==
With the bankruptcy of the iconic Eaton's retailer, the famed store originally constructed in Winnipeg, various alternative uses for the building (including residential condominiums) were suggested, but ultimately the arena was deemed to be the most viable and beneficial to the city's struggling downtown by Winnipeg Mayor Glen Murray and True North. After a small but emotional resistance to losing the Western Canadian landmark by some locals and the Save the Eaton's Coalition, which inspired a "group hug" of the "Big Store" by a reported 180 people in 2001, the store was demolished in 2002 to make way for the new entertainment complex.

The arena officially opened on November 16, 2004, replacing the aging Winnipeg Arena, which had been in operation since 1955. In recognizing Eaton's history, red bricks were incorporated into the design of the arena façade, evoking the memory of their store that had once graced Portage Avenue. An original store window and Tyndall stone surround is mounted in the arena concourse to house a collection of Eaton's memorabilia. In addition, two war memorials were incorporated into the building. The Timothy Eaton statue that was once a main feature of the store is also housed on the concourse of the arena, one floor directly above where it stood on the ground floor of the original Eaton's building.

Originally known as the "True North Centre" during its planning and construction stages, it was named MTS Centre as part of a naming rights agreement with Manitoba Telecom Services (MTS). It was renamed Bell MTS Place on May 30, 2017, following Bell Canada's acquisition of MTS. On June 15, 2021, True North announced that the naming rights had been sold to Winnipeg-based Canada Life Assurance Company under a 10-year agreement, renaming it Canada Life Centre.

== Events ==
=== Ice hockey ===
==== American Hockey League ====
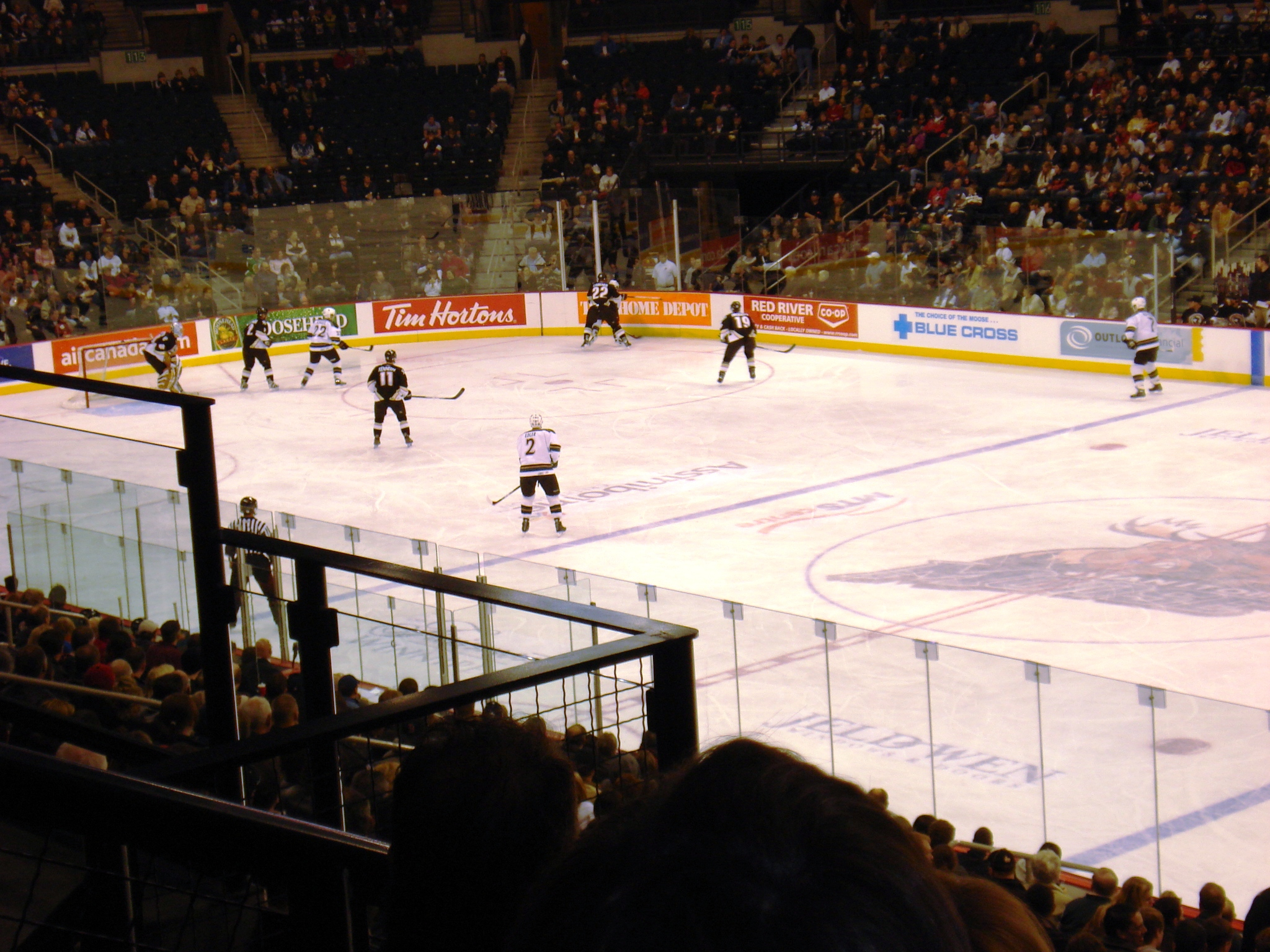
A Manitoba Moose game at the Canada Life Centre (then MTS Centre)

The AHL's Manitoba Moose were the arena's first tenant, from its opening in 2004 to 2011. The team relocated to St. John's prior to the 2011–12 AHL season to make way for the arrival of the Winnipeg Jets. The Moose returned to the MTS Centre for the 2015–16 season, making the arena the first (together with the SAP Center) to be home to both an NHL team and its AHL affiliate. Only the lower bowl, which has a capacity of 8,812, is used for the majority of Moose home games.

The arena hosted the AHL All-Star Classic on February 1, 2006, in which Team Canada defeated Team PlanetUSA, 9–4.

==== National Hockey League ====
From 1972 to 1996, the original Winnipeg Jets played home games out of the now-demolished Winnipeg Arena. Facing mounting financial troubles, the franchise relocated to Arizona after the 1995–96 NHL season and became the Phoenix Coyotes.

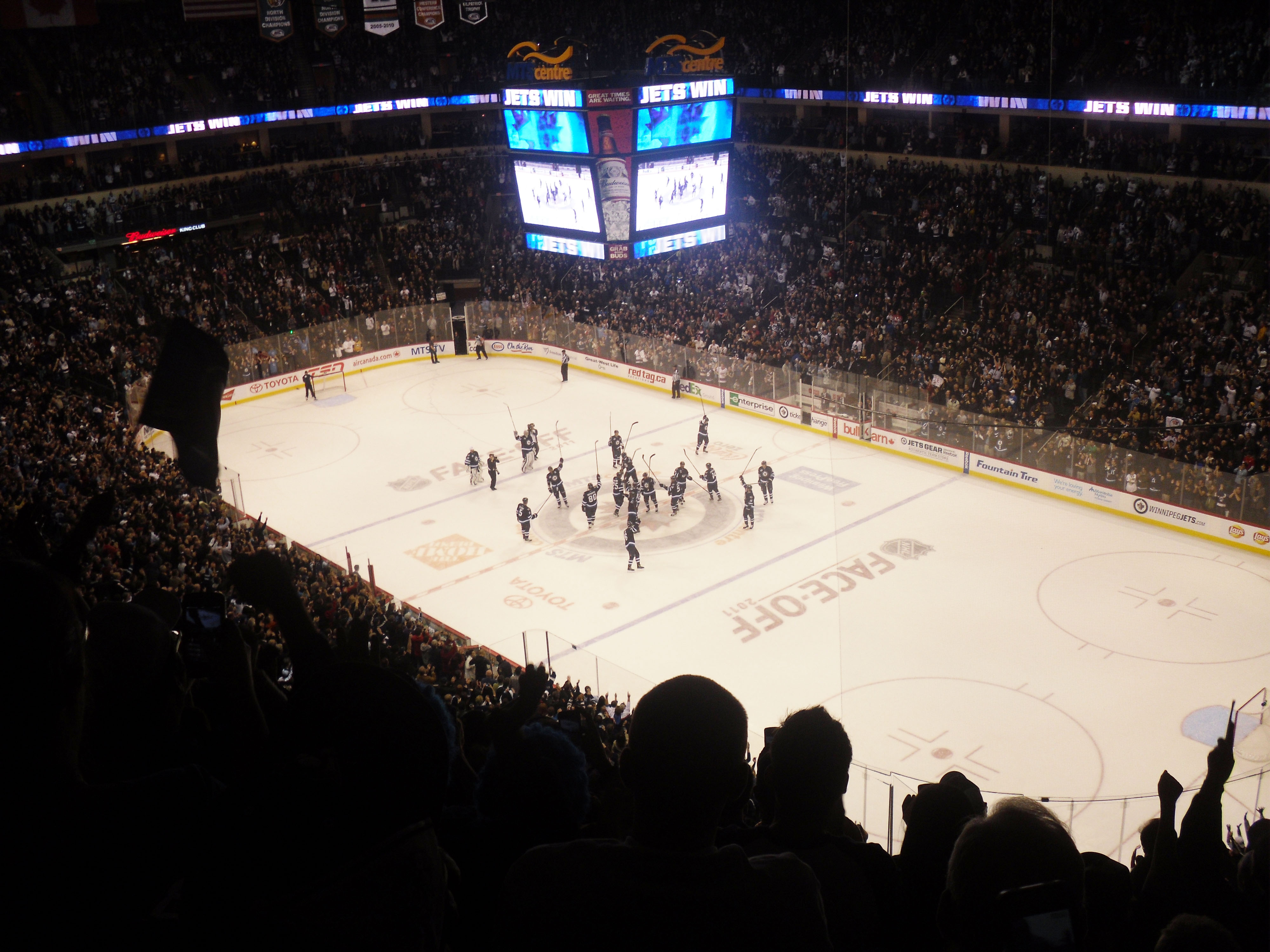
The Winnipeg Jets celebrate their first regulation win in Winnipeg at the Canada Life Centre (then MTS Centre) on October 17, 2011

The idea of Winnipeg one day returning to the NHL gained momentum after the MTS Centre opened. David Thomson and Mark Chipman were floated as potential owners of an NHL team, although many questions were raised about the MTS Centre's potential suitability as an NHL venue. The arena's capacity was well below that of the next-smallest NHL arena at that time, the Nassau Veterans Memorial Coliseum, which sat 16,170, but lacked modern design elements. Chipman stated that the arena's current size was sufficient for an NHL team due to the unique economics of the local market.

Prior to receiving an NHL team, the MTS Centre hosted several NHL preseason games. The first was held on September 17, 2006, between the Edmonton Oilers and the Phoenix Coyotes (the former Winnipeg Jets) in front of a sold-out crowd, which the Oilers won 5–0. The NHL exhibition game became an annual event for the MTS Centre, concluding in September 2010 when the defending Stanley Cup champions, the Chicago Blackhawks, led by captain and Winnipeg-born Jonathan Toews, played the Tampa Bay Lightning in front of a crowd of 14,092.

On May 19, 2011, The Globe and Mail reported that Mark Chipman and True North were finalizing the purchase of the Atlanta Thrashers, with the intent of moving the team to Winnipeg. Chipman and True North had also floated a proposal to return the Coyotes to Winnipeg though this was declined in favor to keeping it in Phoenix. Twelve days later, True North chairman Mark Chipman, NHL Commissioner Gary Bettman, and Manitoba Premier Greg Selinger held a press conference at the MTS Centre to announce the deal, which was formally approved by the NHL Board of Governors three weeks later. As part of the transition to the NHL, the arena went through some minor renovations to bring it in line with the league's standards, including construction of additional press boxes, shuttered lighting, flexible rink glass, and an upgraded ice refrigeration system.

As part of a partnership to subsidize the mortgage of MTS Centre in the wake of the Jets' return, the province reached a 20-year agreement with True North granting it up to $4 million in gaming revenue per year from designated video lottery terminals downtown. These VLTs would initially be located at the Tavern United sports bar next door to MTS Centre, with the option for True North to construct its own lounge at the nearby Cityplace mall. True North would open a Shark Club sports bar and gaming centre at Cityplace in 2013.

Further improvements were made over the next few years, including concourse improvements, installation of a new HD scoreboard, and the replacement of metal rails with plexiglass to eliminate obstructed views around the arena. A total of 278 premium seats were added to the upper level in 2015, slightly increasing the arena's capacity.

==== Western Hockey League ====
In May 2023, the Winnipeg Ice of junior hockey's Western Hockey League announced that for the WHL Championship Series that month, they would play all home games downtown at the larger Canada Life Centre instead of their usual home, the 1,600-capacity Wayne Fleming Arena. Previously, the Brandon Wheat Kings played select playoff games at the arena due to scheduling conflicts with the Royal Manitoba Winter Fair.

==== Professional Women's Hockey League ====
On March 22, 2026, the Professional Women's Hockey League (PWHL) played their first game in Winnipeg at the arena between the Montreal Victoire and Ottawa Charge. The Charge won 2–1 in overtime in front of 15,225 fans. The PWHL returns on March 27, 2027, for a game between the Toronto Sceptres and Montreal Victoire.

==== International ====
Canada Life Centre co-hosted the 2007 IIHF Women's World Championship with Selkirk, which was won by Canada. Other international matches hosted at the arena included 2005 World Junior Championship pretournament games, the fifth game of the 2007 Super Series between Canada and Russia, and the medal round of the 2011 World U-17 Hockey Challenge.

=== Curling ===
Canada Life Centre hosted the 2008 Tim Hortons Brier. From 2005 through 2010 (barring the 2007–08 edition that was held in Quebec City), the arena hosted the Grand Slam of Curling's Canadian Open.

=== Combat sports ===
On June 15, 2013, the arena hosted UFC 161: Evans vs. Henderson, Manitoba's first UFC event. The UFC returned to the arena on December 16, 2017 for UFC on Fox: Lawler vs. dos Anjos. The UFC returned on April 18, 2026, hosting UFC Fight Night: Burns vs. Malott.

In professional wrestling, it hosted a broadcast of WWE Raw on February 24, 2020, which was ultimately the final non-hockey event to be held at the arena before the implementation of COVID-19 pandemic restrictions. WWE SmackDown was broadcast from Canada Life Centre on September 30, 2022, as part of WWE's first shows in Canada since the beginning of the pandemic.

On March 15, 2023, All Elite Wrestling (AEW) hosted a live broadcast of Dynamite and a taping of Rampage at Canada Life Centre, in its second-ever Canadian show. Prior to the event, AEW performer Chris Jericho—a long-time resident of Winnipeg—was honoured by Mayor of Winnipeg Scott Gillingham and Premier of Manitoba Heather Stefanson with a portion of Winnipeg’s Wordsworth Way being renamed Chris Jericho Way, and a Queen Elizabeth II Platinum Jubilee Medal.

== Manitoba Hockey Hall of Fame and Museum ==
The Manitoba Hockey Hall of Fame is located on the main level of the Canada Life Centre.

== See also ==
- List of indoor arenas by capacity
- List of indoor arenas in Canada

Preceded by Winnipeg Arena	Home of the Manitoba Moose; 2004–2011	Succeeded by Mile One Centre (as St. John's IceCaps)
Preceded by Mile One Centre (as St. John's IceCaps)	Home of the Manitoba Moose; 2015–present	Succeeded by present
Preceded by Philips Arena (as Atlanta Thrashers)	Home of the Winnipeg Jets; 2011–present	Succeeded by present
