= True North Sports & Entertainment =

Canadian sports management company

True North Sports & Entertainment Limited
- Type: Private
- Industry: Professional sports, property management, entertainment
- Founded: 2001
- Headquarters: 600 - 223 Carlton street Winnipeg, Manitoba; R3C 1P5
- Key people: Mark Chipman, Chairman & Governor; John Olfert, President & COO
- Products: Winnipeg Jets (NHL); Manitoba Moose (AHL); Bell MTS Iceplex; Burton Cummings Theatre; Canada Life Centre; True North Square; Formerly; St. John's IceCaps (AHL), 2011–2015
- Owner: Megill-Stephenson Co. Osmington Incorporated
- Number of employees: 400
- Subsidiaries: True North Youth Foundation
- Website: tnse.com

True North Sports and Entertainment Limited (TNSE or TNS&E) is a Canadian company based in Winnipeg, Manitoba, that owns and operates Canada Life Centre in downtown Winnipeg and the Winnipeg Jets of the National Hockey League. The company also owns the Jets' minor league affiliate, the Manitoba Moose of the American Hockey League. Aside from hockey, TNSE is also involved in real estate with True North Square, and are active in bringing concerts and other acts to Winnipeg.

== History ==
True North Sports and Entertainment was founded in 2001 by Manitoba Moose co-owner Mark Chipman and several local investors. Their goal was to build a new entertainment and sports venue in downtown Winnipeg to help revive the city's downtown area and possibly one day bring an NHL franchise back to Winnipeg following the departure of the original Winnipeg Jets franchise to Phoenix, Arizona in 1996. Ownership of the Moose was transferred to TNSE in 2003.

The 15,321-seat MTS Centre (later Bell MTS Place and now the Canada Life Centre) was completed in fall 2004 and became the new home of the Moose, replacing the Winnipeg Arena. The Centre was built at a cost of $133.5 million on land acquired from Osmington Incorporated, a real estate firm owned by Toronto billionaire David Thomson. In exchange for the land, Osmington took a minority share in TNSE. Chipman and Thomson, through their respective holding companies, now have complete ownership of TNSE.

In summer 2010, TNSE opened the MTS Iceplex, an arena and training complex located on the western edge of Winnipeg.

TNSE realized its goal of landing an NHL franchise in May 2011, when it purchased the struggling Atlanta Thrashers, subsequently relocating the club to Winnipeg and renaming it the Winnipeg Jets. As a result, the Moose were relocated to St. John's, Newfoundland and Labrador for the 2011–12 season and rebranded as the St. John's IceCaps, and became the top minor league affiliate of the Jets. Although the IceCaps were successful both on and off the ice, TNSE opted to return the club back to Winnipeg for the 2015-16 season. The second incarnation of the Manitoba Moose now share the MTS Centre with their NHL parent club and are one of only two AHL teams to have this arrangement, and will be the only one after the San Jose Barracuda move to TechCU Arena for the 2022-23 season.

=== Bringing the NHL back to Winnipeg ===
Original logo of TNS&E, which was used until 2015

In January 2007, Mark Chipman was invited to meet with NHL executives, including commissioner Gary Bettman, in New York to make a presentation about bringing an NHL team to Winnipeg, either through expansion or relocation. TNSE was not alone—the NHL also met with interested parties from Houston, Kansas City, Seattle, and Las Vegas, but were most impressed by the presentation from the Winnipeg group. Both Vegas and Seattle eventually got expansion teams in later years, with the former getting the Golden Knights in 2017 and the latter in 2021 with the Kraken.

In 2009, Bettman approached Chipman about the possibility of taking over the struggling Phoenix Coyotes. The Coyotes were on the verge of declaring bankruptcy and were purchased by the league out of bankruptcy court later that year. In October, Chipman made a second presentation to the league about relocating a team to Winnipeg. The Coyotes ownership issue remained unresolved in May 2010. As the league was not prepared to cover the team's losses for another season, the league executive reached a tentative agreement to sell the Coyotes to TNSE, allowing them to relocate the franchise back to Winnipeg. This was intended as a back-up plan, as the league's first choice was to keep the team in Arizona. With no other investors in place, the league asked the City of Glendale to cover the Coyotes losses for the 2010–11 season. Facing a tight deadline, city council voted in favor of the deal rather than risk losing the primary tenant of their arena. According to Chipman, TNSE came "within ten minutes of acquiring (the Coyotes)".

After a failed bid to sell the team to Matthew Hulziser, the NHL and TNSE resumed their negotiations in spring of 2011. Glendale city council decided to cover the team's losses for another year, so TNSE shifted their focus on another opportunity—to acquire the Atlanta Thrashers from the Atlanta Spirit group. On the morning of 31 May 2011, the sale was finalized and announced at a press conference held at the MTS Centre. The sale and relocation of the team to Winnipeg was approved by the NHL Board of Governors on June 21. Mark Chipman confirmed that the team would be known as the Jets at the 2011 NHL Entry Draft on June 24. The Jets played their inaugural game on October 9, 2011 in front of a sold-out crowd at the MTS Centre, losing 5–1 against the Montreal Canadiens.

Although the Jets did not qualify for the Stanley Cup playoffs in their first season, the team was very successful off the ice. It was widely believed that the Jets, playing in the league's smallest market, would require assistance through the NHL's revenue sharing program to be financially viable. However, the team's revenues in 2011–2012 exceeded expectations to the extent that they did not qualify. According to Forbes' 2012 NHL financial report, the Jets generated $105 million US in revenue during their inaugural season, 16th best in the league, and posted operating income of $13.3 million. According to Forbes' 2013 report, the value of the franchise doubled within two years of TNSE's acquisition in 2011.

A tradition among Jets fans in recent years is to shout the lyrics "True North" during the singing of O Canada prior to games, presumably in recognition of the ownership group which brought the NHL back to Winnipeg.

== Assets ==
Assets currently owned by True North Sports & Entertainment include:

- Hockey For All Centre (formerly MTS Iceplex and Bell MTS Iceplex), an arena and training complex located on the western edge of Winnipeg. The Iceplex features four ice surfaces and is used by several amateur teams, local minor hockey, and recreational leagues. It also serves as the practice facility for the Winnipeg Jets and Manitoba Moose.
- Burton Cummings Theatre (formerly Walker Theatre), a 1,581-seat music venue in Winnipeg's Exchange District
- Canada Life Centre (formerly MTS Centre and Bell MTS Place), a multi-purpose arena and sports venue in downtown Winnipeg.
- Fannex, an in-game mobile entertainment system presented at live sporting and entertainment events. Fannex is jointly invested with IC Group LP.
- Manitoba Moose, an American Hockey League (AHL) franchise.
- TN Touring, a touring entertainment producer established in 2017. Its first show was The Illusionists, which began touring in April 2018.
- True North Real Estate Development, a subsidiary that operates True North Square. This is a joint venture with James Richardson & Sons.
- Winnipeg Jets, a National Hockey League franchise.
- Jets Gear (and truenorthshop.com), the official store of the Winnipeg Jets and Manitoba Moose.
- TNRED, the real estate division of True North Sports + Entertainment, finalized the acquisition of the Portage Place mall, land, and assets on November 29, 2024. They are currently moving forward with a major, multi-use redevelopment project that includes a significant partnership with the Southern Chiefs' Organization (SCO) to build a health-care centre and a residential tower with affordable housing units.

Former assets include:

- MTS Centre Exhibition Hall, 2010–2011
- St. John's IceCaps, 2011-2015, an AHL team. This was a joint venture with St. John's Sports and Entertainment.

=== True North Square ===
True North Square is a plaza under construction in downtown Winnipeg. It is a joint venture between TNSE and James Richardson & Sons and is being constructed at the site of the former Carlton Inn hotel, which True North purchased in June 2015 following months of negotiations with the city. The heart of the project is a two-acre public park which will include green space and a public stage. Construction of the public portion of the plaza which will be partially funded by the provincial and city governments as will connecting the buildings to the Winnipeg Walkway.

The remainder of the plaza will include four mixed-used towers being constructed adjacent to the park, which will house a luxury hotel, office and retail space, and residential units. The towers, estimated at a cost of CA$400 million, was planned for completion in 2019.

=== Burton Cummings Theatre ===
The Burton Cummings Theatre for the Performing Arts is a 1,600-seat former vaudeville theatre-turned-music venue in downtown Winnipeg. TNSE assumed management of the venue in 2014 through a lease agreement with the not-for-profit theatre's board of directors. Under this arrangement, TNSE also commenced with badly needed repairs and upgrades to the building. In 2016, TNSE exercised its option to purchase the building.

=== MTS Centre Exhibition Hall ===
The MTS Centre Exhibition Hall was an exhibition centre operated by TNSE from 2010 to 2011. It was located in the now-demolished A&B Sound building across the street from Canada Life Centre and hosted three exhibits during its existence. The first show, the controversial Bodies: The Exhibition, ran from September 2010 to January 2011. Titanic: The Artifact Exhibition, produced by RMS Titanic Inc., ran from February to July 2011. It featured close to 200 of the over 5,500 collected artifacts from the doomed ocean liner. The final show, Da Vinci the Genius, ran from August to November 2011.

== True North Youth Foundation ==
True North Youth Foundation
- Formation: October 9, 1996
- Type: Nonprofit
- Services: Camp Manitou; Winnipeg Jets Hockey Academy; Project 11
- Executive Director: Dwayne Green
- Website: truenorthyouthfoundation.com
- Formerly called: Manitoba Moose Yearling Foundation (1996-2011); Winnipeg Jets True North Foundation (2011-2016)

The True North Youth Foundation (TNYF), formerly the Manitoba Moose Yearling Foundation, is a non-profit organization created by TNSE in 1996. The foundation raises funds for charitable causes and also runs its own projects: Camp Manitou, a children's summer camp; Winnipeg Jets Hockey Academy, a youth hockey school; and Project 11, a program promoting mental wellness in schools and youth groups.

Project 11, led by TNSE senior vice-president Craig Heisinger, was created in response to the death of Rick Rypien, a former Manitoba Moose player who suffered from severe depression.

In 2018, Canadian charity watchdog group Charity Intelligence Canada alleged that True North Youth Foundation, along with other charities related to Canadian hockey teams, was keeping money from donations in reserves without returning funds to the communities they claimed to serve and funnelling money to other charities rather than operating its own programs. In May of 2019, Kate Bahen, the managing director of Charity Intelligence, wrote a formal apology letter to TNYF, acknowledging that TNYF does operate its own charity programs helping youth in Manitoba and apologizing for calling TNYF "a puck hog" in a 2018 CityNews interview.
