= Stéphane Morin =

Canadian ice hockey player (1969–1998)

- Born: March 27, 1969 Montreal, Quebec, Canada
- Died: October 6, 1998 (aged 29) Oberhausen, Germany
- Height: 6 ft 0 in (183 cm)
- Weight: 174 lb (79 kg; 12 st 6 lb)
- Position: Centre
- Shot: Left
- Played for: Quebec Nordiques; Vancouver Canucks
- NHL draft: 43rd overall, 1989; Quebec Nordiques
- Playing career: 1989–1998

Joseph Normand Stéphane Morin (March 27, 1969 – October 6, 1998) was a Canadian ice hockey player who played in the National Hockey League between 1989 and 1994 with the Quebec Nordiques and the Vancouver Canucks.

== Early life ==
Morin was born in Montreal, Quebec. As a youth, he played in the 1981 Quebec International Pee-Wee Hockey Tournament with a minor ice hockey team from Saint-Leonard, Quebec.

== Playing career ==
Morin played his junior hockey for the Chicoutimi Saguenéens. He was passed over in the 1988 draft, but following a monster season in 1988–89 in which he led the QMJHL in scoring with 186 points and won the Michel Brière Memorial Trophy for Most Valuable Player in the Quebec Major Junior Hockey League, he was selected 43rd overall in the 1989 NHL entry draft.

Morin turned pro for the 1989–90 season and spent most of the season with the Halifax Citadels, where he performed well, earning a six-game call-up to Quebec in which he picked up two assists. In 1990–91, he was called up mid-season and performed exceptionally well, notching 40 points in 48 games on a weak Quebec club to finish 4th in team scoring. However, this would represent the high-water mark of Morin's career, as he slid down the depth chart the following year registered just 10 points in 30 games for the Nordiques and found himself back in the minors for much of the season.

Released by Quebec, Morin signed with the Vancouver Canucks in 1992. He spent two seasons in Vancouver's system during which he dominated the American Hockey League with the Hamilton Canucks, but appeared in only 6 games for the NHL Canucks over that span, recording three points.

After leaving the Vancouver organization, Morin signed on with the Minnesota Moose of the International Hockey League. While Morin's skating ability was considered questionable and cited as the reason he failed to stick in the NHL, he was a gifted minor-league scorer with tremendous offensive skills, and he led the IHL in scoring with 114 points in 1994–95. He would spend four seasons in the IHL with the Moose and later the Long Beach Ice Dogs.

For the 1998–99 season, Morin signed in Germany with the Berlin Capitals.

== Death ==
On October 6, 1998, in his 7th game with his new team, he was complaining of feeling unwell during the first period. Early in the second period, he collapsed on the bench as a result of heart failure, and medical staff were unable to revive him. He was pronounced dead at a hospital, leaving a wife and newborn son, Frederick. An autopsy was performed and it was discovered that Morin had undiagnosed chronic bronchitis and an enlarged heart. It also revealed he had suffered an undetected heart attack in the past several years.

During his career, Morin appeared in 90 NHL games, recording 16 goals and 39 assists for 55 points, along with 52 penalty minutes.

== Career statistics ==
			Regular season					Playoffs
Season	Team	League	GP	G	A	Pts	PIM	GP	G	A	Pts	PIM
1984–85	Montréal-Bourassa	QMAAA	41	16	22	38	12	10	5	13	18	10
1985–86	Montréal-Bourassa	QMAAA	42	26	37	63	—	—	—	—	—	—
1986–87	Shawinigan Cataractes	QMJHL	65	9	14	23	28	14	1	3	4	27
1987–88	Shawinigan Cataractes	QMJHL	34	16	15	31	6	—	—	—	—	—
1987–88	Chicoutimi Saguenéens	QMJHL	34	22	30	52	12	6	3	8	11	2
1988–89	Chicoutimi Saguenéens	QMJHL	70	77	109	186	71	—	—	—	—	—
1989–90	Quebec Nordiques	NHL	6	0	2	2	2	—	—	—	—	—
1989–90	Halifax Citadels	AHL	65	28	32	60	60	6	3	4	7	6
1990–91	Quebec Nordiques	NHL	48	13	27	40	30	—	—	—	—	—
1990–91	Halifax Citadels	AHL	17	8	14	22	18	—	—	—	—	—
1991–92	Quebec Nordiques	NHL	30	2	8	10	14	—	—	—	—	—
1991–92	Halifax Citadels	AHL	30	17	13	30	29	—	—	—	—	—
1992–93	Vancouver Canucks	NHL	1	0	1	1	0	—	—	—	—	—
1992–93	Hamilton Canucks	AHL	70	31	54	85	49	—	—	—	—	—
1993–94	Vancouver Canucks	NHL	5	1	1	2	6	—	—	—	—	—
1993–94	Hamilton Canucks	AHL	69	38	71	109	48	4	3	2	5	4
1994–95	Minnesota Moose	IHL	81	33	81	114	53	2	0	1	1	0
1995–96	Minnesota Moose	IHL	80	27	51	78	75	—	—	—	—	—
1996–97	Manitoba Moose	IHL	12	3	6	9	4	—	—	—	—	—
1996–97	Long Beach Ice Dogs	IHL	65	25	57	82	73	18	6	13	19	14
1997–98	Long Beach Ice Dogs	IHL	27	10	17	27	30	13	1	10	11	18
1998–99	Sorel Dinosaures	QSPHL	2	0	0	0	0	—	—	—	—	—
1998–99	Berlin Capitals	DEL	7	2	6	8	6	—	—	—	—	—
NHL totals			90	16	39	55	52	—	—	—	—	—
AHL totals			251	122	184	306	204	10	6	6	12	10
IHL totals			265	98	212	310	235	33	7	24	31	32

== See also ==
- List of ice hockey players who died during their playing career
