= St. John's IceCaps =

Defunct American Hockey League team

- City: St. John's, Newfoundland and Labrador
- League: American Hockey League
- Founded: 1994 (First franchise; as a member of the IHL); 1969 (Second franchise)
- Operated: 2011–2017
- Home arena: Mile One Centre
- Colours: Polar night blue, aviator blue, silver, white (2011–2015) Red, white, blue (2015–2017)
- Owners: Danny Williams (local operations of both incarnations, and IceCaps intellectual property); True North Sports & Entertainment (first franchise); Montreal Canadiens (Molson family et al.) (second franchise)
- Media: CJYQ
- Affiliates: Winnipeg Jets (NHL); Montreal Canadiens (NHL)

Franchise history
- First franchise
- 1994–1996: Minnesota Moose
- 1996–2011: Manitoba Moose
- 2011–2015: St. John's IceCaps
- 2015–present: Manitoba Moose
- Second franchise
- 1969–1971 1971–1984: Montreal Voyageurs; Nova Scotia Voyageurs
- 1984–1990 1990–1999: Sherbrooke Canadiens; Fredericton Canadiens
- 1999–2002: Quebec Citadelles
- 2002–2015: Hamilton Bulldogs
- 2015–2017: St. John's IceCaps
- 2017–present: Laval Rocket

Championships
- Regular season titles: 0
- Division titles: 1 (2011–12)
- Conference titles: 1 (2013–14)

The St. John's IceCaps were a professional ice hockey team based in St. John's, Newfoundland and Labrador, Canada. They were members of the North Division of the Eastern Conference of the American Hockey League (AHL). The team was originally affiliated with the second incarnation of the Winnipeg Jets from 2011 to 2015. However, beginning in the 2015–16 AHL season, they became the top affiliate of the Montreal Canadiens of the National Hockey League (NHL) after the Jets relocated their franchise back to Manitoba and the Canadiens moved the former Hamilton Bulldogs franchise to St. John's. The IceCaps were the second AHL team to be located in St. John's, following the Toronto Maple Leafs' affiliate, the St. John's Maple Leafs from 1991 to 2005.

== History ==
=== Winnipeg Jets franchise (2011–2015) ===
The franchise was founded in 1994 as the Minnesota Moose, who at that time, were members of the International Hockey League. The team played two seasons in St. Paul, Minnesota, before relocating to Winnipeg in 1996 following the departure of the original Winnipeg Jets to Phoenix, Arizona. The Manitoba Moose continued to play in the IHL until the league folded in 2001, at which time the Moose joined the AHL and became the top affiliate of the Vancouver Canucks. During their ten years in the AHL, the Moose made it to the Calder Cup Finals once, in 2009, losing 4–2 to the Hershey Bears in the best-of-seven series.

In May 2011, True North Sports and Entertainment, owners of the Moose franchise, purchased the Atlanta Thrashers' NHL franchise and relocated the team to Winnipeg for the 2011–12 NHL season. With the return of the NHL to Winnipeg, a new home was needed for the Moose and a deal was reached with former Newfoundland and Labrador Premier Danny Williams to relocate the AHL team to St. John's for the 2011–12 season. The AHL Board of Governors unanimously approved the franchise's relocation to St. John's on June 20, 2011. Later that day, Williams and True North Senior Vice President Craig Heisinger held an event at Mile One Centre officially announcing the relocation of the Manitoba Moose to St. John's. At the same time, True North made the new St. John's team the top affiliate of its new NHL team.

Coincidentally, the nearby community of Conception Bay South had been awarded the Kraft Hockeyville exhibition game for 2011, which would have featured the Winnipeg Jets facing the Ottawa Senators. Because of the proximity of Conception Bay South to St. John's, the game between the Senators and the Jets was relocated to the Mile One Centre to accommodate larger crowds. This would be the first IceCaps-related game, as many of the Jets players were prospects who would be assigned to the IceCaps shortly after. The de facto home Jets defeated the Senators, 3–1.

The IceCaps played their inaugural game on October 7, 2011, in Providence, Rhode Island against the Providence Bruins. Their first home game was on October 14, 2011, against the Hamilton Bulldogs. In their inaugural season, the IceCaps finished first in Atlantic division and reached the Eastern Conference Championship series, falling in four games to the eventual Calder Cup Champion Norfolk Admirals.

After missing the playoffs in the 2012–13 season, the IceCaps would finish 2013–14 in second place in the Atlantic Division (46-23-2-5, 99 pts) and would return to the playoffs by earning the fourth playoff seed in the Eastern Conference. The IceCaps defeated the Albany Devils 3 games to 1 in the conference quarterfinals and the Norfolk Admirals 4 games to 2 in the conference semifinals. On June 3, 2014, with a 5–0 victory over the Wilkes-Barre Scranton Penguins in Game 6 of the Eastern Conference Championship series, the IceCaps claimed the Richard Canning Trophy as Eastern Conference champions and advanced to the Calder Cup Finals for the first time since relocating to Newfoundland from Manitoba. This marked the second time that St. John's would be represented in the AHL Championship series and the first since the St. John's Maple Leafs advanced to the 1992 Calder Cup Finals against the Adirondack Red Wings. The IceCaps would be defeated in five games by the Western Conference Champion Texas Stars.

=== Montreal Canadiens franchise (2015–2017) ===
In January 2014, True North Sports and Entertainment chairman Mark Chipman confirmed that the organization was exploring plans to relocate their AHL franchise to Thunder Bay, Ontario after the current lease with Danny Williams' group expired in 2015. Although the IceCaps were a financial success, the geographical location of St. John's has presented significant travel difficulties for Jets' personnel. Williams stated he would try to find another team to bring to Newfoundland should the IceCaps leave.

In September 2014, True North and Williams' group agreed to extend their agreement through the 2015–16 season. However, a year later, a deal was made between Williams, True North, and the Montreal Canadiens for the Hamilton Bulldogs franchise to move to Newfoundland for the 2015–16 season after the Moose franchise moved back to Winnipeg. Upon the move, the Bulldogs assumed the "IceCaps" moniker, whose trademark remained with Williams' group. This deal was expected to be temporary, as the Canadiens, like the Jets, owned their AHL franchise license and had plans to locate their team closer to their NHL club. In July 2016, the Canadiens confirmed the relocation to the newly constructed Place Bell arena in Laval, Quebec, for the start of the 2017–18 season, where they would become the Laval Rocket. Danny Williams stated his intentions to find another franchise with the AHL or another league. In 2018, the ECHL approved the expansion Newfoundland Growlers in St. John's for the 2018–19 season as a replacement for the IceCaps in the market.

The St. John's market is currently served by the QMJHL's Newfoundland Regiment.

== Team information ==
=== Name ===
Following the announcement of the team's relocation to St. John's, Williams stated that while he would prefer to hold a fan contest to name the team; however, with insufficient time before the start of the season, this task was brought to the team's advisory committee. The "Moose" moniker, which the team had used until that time, was immediately ruled out. The high volume of vehicular accidents in Newfoundland and Labrador involving the animal was cited as one of the reasons behind not retaining the old name. Several media outlets soon started reporting that the team would be known as the St. John's IceCaps, this after St. John's IceCaps Inc. was registered with Newfoundland and Labrador's registry of deeds and companies. The official announcement was made on July 29, 2011.

=== Logos and uniforms ===
The jerseys of the St. John's IceCaps, from 2011 to 2015 (while the franchise was owned by the Winnipeg Jets)

The first St. John's IceCaps' franchise wore uniforms patterned after the Winnipeg Jets: aviator blue, white, polar night blue, and silver. The IceCaps' jerseys also included the Winnipeg Jets' primary logo on the shoulder. The second franchise had uniforms patterned after the Montreal Canadiens' traditional red, blue, and white.

The IceCaps logo was the same for both franchises, albeit with different colour schemes to match the uniforms. The logo is a registered trademark of the Danny Williams group and not the Jets or Canadiens; thus it could still be reused for a future team in St. John's.

=== Mascot ===
Buddy the Puffin was the mascot of the IceCaps. Buddy was previously the mascot of the St. John's Maple Leafs. Buddy's number is 92, which represents 1992, the year that he was introduced as the mascot of the St. John's Maple Leafs.

=== Schedule ===
Newfoundland's isolated location in the easternmost part of Canada presented travel difficulties for teams flying to and from St. John's. Most flights to St. John's required a connection at Montréal or Toronto, which added to the length and cost of travel. In order to reduce costs for both the IceCaps and other AHL teams, teams traveling to St. John's usually played two games in a row.

== Season-by-season results ==
Calder Cup champions	Conference champions	Division champions	League leader

Records as of April 28, 2017.

Regular Season											Playoffs				
Season	Games	Won	Lost	OTL	SOL	Points	PCT	Goals for	Goals against	Standing	Year	1st round	2nd round	3rd round	Finals
2011–12	76	43	25	5	3	94	.618	240	216	1st, Atlantic	2012	W, 3–1, SYR	W, 4–3, WBS	L, 0–4, NOR	—
2012–13	76	32	36	3	5	72	.420	195	237	5th, Atlantic	2013	Did not qualify			
2013–14	76	46	23	2	5	99	.651	258	207	2nd, Atlantic	2014	W, 3–1, ALB	W, 4–2, NOR	W, 4–2 WBS	L, 1–4 TEX
2014–15	76	32	33	9	2	75	.493	183	235	5th, Atlantic	2015	Did not qualify			
2015–16	76	32	33	8	3	75	.493	208	239	4th, North	2016	Did not qualify			
2016–17	76	36	30	8	2	82	.539	216	220	4th, North	2017	L, 1–3, SYR	—	—	—
Totals	456	221	180	35	20	497	.545	1300	1354			3 Playoff Appearances			

== Players ==
=== Team captains ===
- Jason Jaffray (2011–2015)
- Gabriel Dumont (2015–2016)
- Max Friberg (2016–2017)

== Team records ==
=== Single season ===
Goals: Chris Terry, 30, (2016–17)
Assists: Jason Jaffray, 41, (2013–14)
Points: Chris Terry, 68, (2016–17)
Goals, Defense: Paul Postma, 13, (2011–12)
Assists, Defense: Brenden Kichton (2013–14), Will O'Neill (2014–15), 38
Points, Defense: Brenden Kichton (2013–14), Will O'Neill (2014–15), 48
Penalty minutes: J.C. Lipon, 163, (2014–15)
GAA: Michael Hutchinson, 2.30, (2013–14)
SV%: Michael Hutchinson, .923, (2013–14)

Goaltender stats (min. 20 games played for the season)

=== Career ===
Career goals: Eric O'Dell, 72, (2011–15)
Career assists: Jason Jaffray, 105, (2011–15)
Career points: Jason Jaffray, 167, (2011–15)
Career playoff goals: Eric O'Dell, 9, (2011–14)
Career playoff points: Andrew Gordon, 19, (2013–14)
Career playoff assists: Zach Redmond, 15, (2011–17)
Career penalty minutes: Patrice Cormier, 316, (2011–15)
Career goaltending wins: Eddie Pasquale, 68, (2011–16)
Career shutouts: Eddie Pasquale, 9, (2011–16)
Career games: Carl Klingberg, 248, (2011–15)
