= Craig Heisinger =

Canadian ice hockey executive (born 1962)

- Born: October 16, 1962 (age 63); Winnipeg, Manitoba, Canada
- Occupations: Assistant General Manager and Director of Hockey Operations, Winnipeg Jets (NHL); Senior Vice President, True North Sports & Entertainment Limited; General Manager, Manitoba Moose (AHL)

Craig Heisinger (born October 16, 1962) is a Canadian ice hockey executive. He is the assistant general manager and director of hockey operations for the Winnipeg Jets of the National Hockey League and senior vice president of True North Sports and Entertainment. He is also the general manager of the Manitoba Moose, the American Hockey League affiliate of the Jets.

== Equipment manager and trainer ==
=== Junior hockey ===
Heisinger began his career in hockey as the equipment manager of the Fort Garry South Blues of the Manitoba Junior Hockey League (MJHL) in 1978–79. After two season with the Blues, he spent four years (1980–1984) with the Winnipeg Warriors of the Western Hockey League (WHL) and another four years (1984–1988) with the Brandon Wheat Kings, also of the WHL.

=== Professional hockey ===
Heisinger made the jump to the NHL when he joined the original Winnipeg Jets hockey club as assistant equipment manager. Two years later, he was promoted to equipment manager and served in that capacity until the Jets left for Phoenix, Arizona in 1996. Heisinger, who had a young family at the time, decided not to move with the team. Instead, he accepted an offer to be the equipment manager for Winnipeg's new International Hockey League team, the Manitoba Moose. Heisinger served as the equipment manager of the Moose for three seasons.

=== International ===
Heisinger's first international stint came in 1988, when he served as a trainer for Team Canada at the World Junior Hockey Championship in Moscow, where Canada won the gold medal. In 1997, he was a member of Team Canada's training staff at the World Ice Hockey Championships, where Canada also won gold. In his most prominent international role, he was selected as the Equipment Manager for Canada's men's ice hockey team at the 1998 Winters Olympics in Nagano, Japan, the first Olympics in which NHL players were allowed to compete.

== Executive career ==
=== AHL ===
In 1999, after three seasons as equipment manager, the Moose promoted Heisinger to assistant general manager under Randy Carlyle. He was promoted to general manager in 2002 when Carlyle left to join the Washington Capitals and has held that post since, including the franchise's four seasons as the St. John's IceCaps (2011–2015). He was also named senior vice president after True North Sports and Entertainment acquired the team in 2003.

Hesinger has been honoured by the AHL on two occasions. In 2009, Heisinger was named the James C. Hendy Memorial Award winner as the most outstanding executive after the Moose enjoyed their most successful season in franchise history. In 2017, the AHL selected Heisinger for the Thomas Ebright Memorial Award for his career contributions to the league.

=== NHL ===
In May 2011, True North named Heisinger the director of hockey operations and assistant general manager for its new NHL team, Winnipeg Jets, working under general manager Kevin Cheveldayoff. Heisinger continues to hold the titles of senior vice-president for True North and general manager of the AHL team.

== Personal life ==
Heisinger and his wife Vickie live in Winnipeg. They have four sons: Jake, Mack, Tucker and Zachery.

Heisinger is an advocate for mental health and, together with the True North Youth Foundation (the charitable arm of True North Sports & Entertainment), created Project 11 to promote mental wellness amongst students and athletes. The program in named after former Moose player Rick Rypien, a former Manitoba Moose player who wore #11, who died in 2011 after a lengthy battle with depression.
