= Mark Chipman =

Canadian hockey executive and businessman (born 1960)

Mark Chipman OM
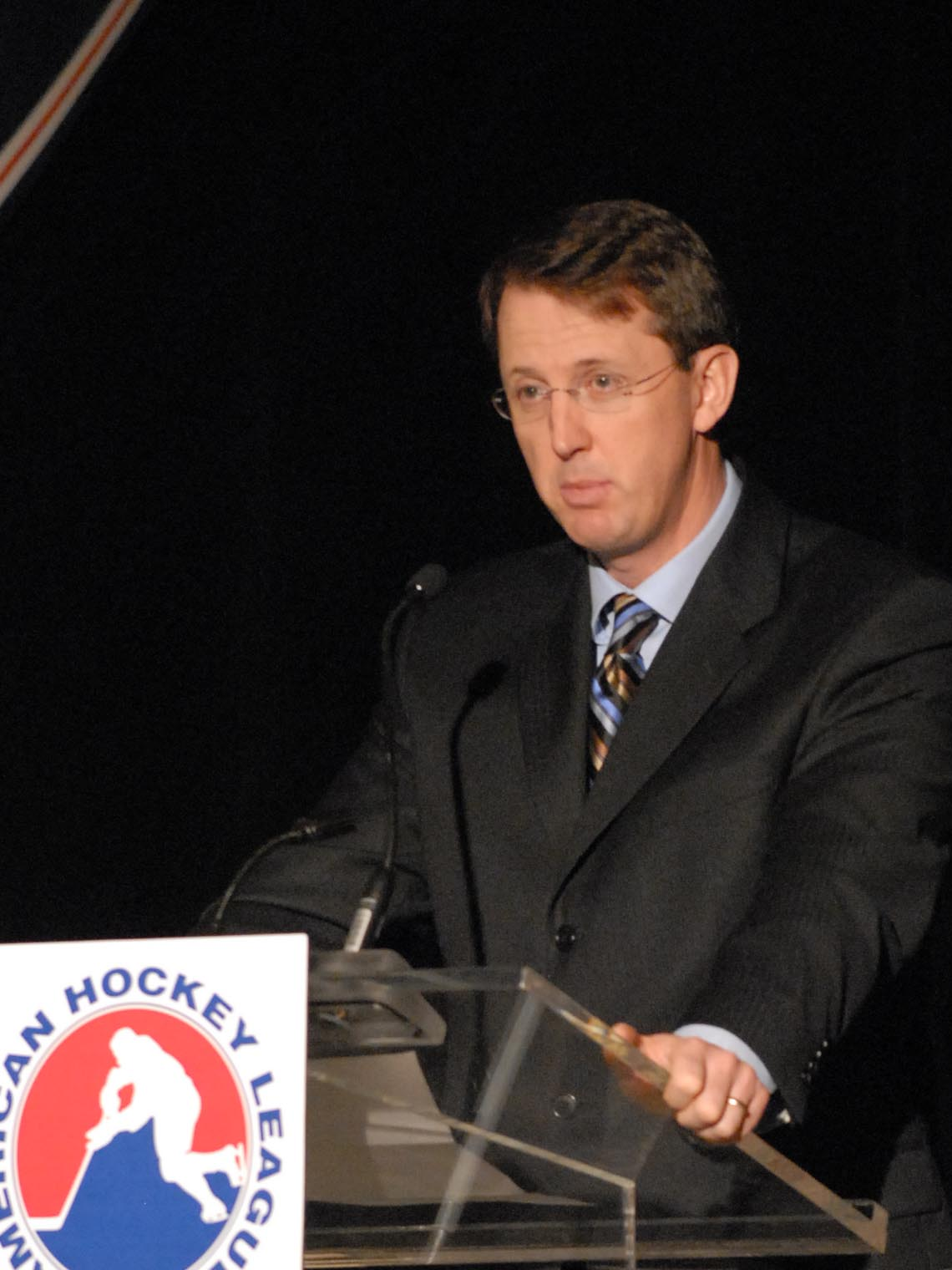
- Born: October 8, 1960 (age 65); Winnipeg, Manitoba, Canada
- Education: University of North Dakota (BA, JD)
- Title: Chairman of True North Sports & Entertainment; President of Megill-Stephenson Company (2001–?)

Mark Chipman OM (born October 8, 1960) is a Canadian hockey executive, businessman, and lawyer. Chipman is best known as the chairman of True North Sports & Entertainment, which owns the Winnipeg Jets of the National Hockey League and Canada Life Centre in Winnipeg, Manitoba. He is also the team's governor and currently a member of the National Hockey League Board of Governors' Executive Committee.

== Education ==
Chipman attended St. Paul's High School in Winnipeg, graduating in 1978. From 1979 to 1983, he studied economics at the University of North Dakota, while playing football for the Fighting Sioux. He obtained his JD degree from the same institution in 1985.

== Business career ==
=== Megill-Stephenson Company ===
After working as a lawyer in Florida, Chipman returned to Winnipeg in 1988 and joined Birchwood Automotive Group, a group of car dealerships founded in 1963 by his father, Robert Chipman. In 2001, Mark succeeded his father as president of Megill-Stephenson Company, the Chipman family's holding company, whose subsidiaries today include Birchwood (now managed by brother Steve Chipman), Longboat Development Corporation (a real estate development division run by brother Jeoffrey Chipman), and True North Sports & Entertainment (jointly owned with Osmington Inc). Megill-Stephenson's former subsidiaries include National Leasing Group (founded in 1977 and sold to Canadian Western Bank in 2009) and the Stevenson Group of companies (largely divested in 2015).

=== True North Sports & Entertainment ===
After the original Winnipeg Jets left for Phoenix in 1996, Chipman was part of a group that purchased the International Hockey League's Minnesota Moose and moved them to Winnipeg, renaming them the Manitoba Moose. With the demise of the IHL in 2001, Chipman was instrumental in brokering a deal which saw six former IHL teams, including the Moose, accepted into the American Hockey League.

Chipman and a group of local investors created True North Sports & Entertainment in 2001 for the purpose of building a new sports and entertainment venue in downtown Winnipeg. Originally called the True North Centre, the MTS Centre (now Canada Life Centre) opened in 2004 and became the new home of the Moose. Ownership of the Moose was transferred to True North in 2003 in order to consolidate the operations of the team and new arena.

Chipman's ultimate goal was to bring an NHL team back to Winnipeg to fill the void left by the Jets. As early as 2009, True North was reported to be in discussion with the NHL regarding the purchase of the Phoenix Coyotes in order to relocate the club back to Winnipeg. At the same time, there were also rumors that the Atlanta Thrashers were also on the market.

After two years of on-and-off-again discussion with the NHL regarding the Coyotes, Chipman and True North were presented the opportunity to purchase the Atlanta Thrashers. On May 31, 2011, Chipman and NHL Commissioner Gary Bettman announced that a deal had been reached to purchase the Thrashers and relocate them to Winnipeg for the upcoming season. The NHL Board of Governors approved the sale and relocation a few weeks later. At the 2011 NHL draft held in St. Paul, Minnesota, Chipman revealed the franchise's new name just before making its first-round pick.

As chairman and principal owner of the Jets, Chipman represents the Jets at the NHL Board of Governors, and is currently a member of the board's executive committee.

== Honours ==
In 2005, Chipman was awarded the James C. Hendy Memorial Award as the AHL's top executive. He also received the Thomas Ebright Memorial Award in 2011 for his outstanding contributions to the AHL.

In 2012, Chipman was made a member of the Order of Manitoba. Later in 2012, Chipman was honoured by UND as the recipient of the Sioux Award, the highest award given by the university, for his accomplishments and community service.

== Personal ==
Chipman serves on the Hockey Hall of Fame Selection Committee and formerly on the board of the Hockey Canada Foundation. He is married to Patti; they have three daughters.

His sister, Susan Millican, is a noted Canadian television and film industry executive.

Sporting positions
Preceded by Bruce Levenson; Ed Peskowitz as Atlanta Thrashers	Winnipeg Jets owner 2011–present	Incumbent
