= Camp Manitou =

Canadian non-profit organization and summer camp

Coordinates: 49.86634°N 97.34584°W

- Formation: 1930 (founded); 1949 (incorporated)
- Founder: Rotary Club, Kinsmen Club, Cosmopolitan, Optimist Club, and the YMCA
- Type: Nonprofit
- Legal status: Charitable organization
- Headquarters: 850 Green Oaks Lane, Headingley, MB
- Owner: True North Youth Foundation
- Camp Director: Jeff Hofer
- Affiliations: Manitoba Camping Association
- Website: campmanitou.mb.ca

Camp Manitou is a summer camp, year-round outdoor recreation facility, the location of TNYF Training, and a non-profit charitable organization located in Headingley, Manitoba, Canada, just outside Winnipeg. It is operated by the True North Youth Foundation, a subsidiary of True North Sports & Entertainment.

Camp Manitou was founded in 1930 by a group of six service clubs in Winnipeg: Rotary, Cosmopolitan, Kiwanis, Kinsmen, Optimist, and the YMCA, with the Lions Club joining in 1953. It was incorporated as a non-profit charitable organization in 1949 with the mission to provide a camping experience for underprivileged/at-risk children and youth.

== History ==
Camp Manitou was founded in 1930 by a group of six service clubs in Winnipeg: Rotary, Cosmopolitan, Kiwanis, Kinsmen, Optimist, and the YMCA, with the latter operating the camp until 1997.

It was incorporated as a non-profit charitable organization in 1949 with the mission to provide a camping experience for underprivileged/at-risk children and youth. The Lions Club soon joined the organization in 1953.

The True North Youth Foundation, a subsidiary of True North Sports & Entertainment, entered into a long-term lease and operating agreement that eventually led to the foundation assuming the operations of Camp Manitou as of January 2nd, 2014.

== Location and facilities ==
Camp Manitou is located west of Winnipeg in a bend in the Assiniboine River on Green Oaks Lane in Headingley, Manitoba, Canada.

The camp facilities include a main lodge with a commercial kitchen, dining room/multipurpose room, and bedrooms able to accommodate 72 sleepers; a gym building; six cabins which house nature education programs, music programs, games, and crafts; a swimming pool; and 28 acres of land. Some activities at the camp include zipline, mountain biking, canoeing, archery, orienteering, crafts, field games, water games, and swimming. During the summer camp programs, activities are run by trained Camp Manitou Activity Leaders. In the off-season, rental groups may rent equipment for their use.

In 2023, the TNYF Training Centre was added, offering 25 Certification Courses and Workshops that fall under 5 pillars: 1) First Aid & Safety 2) Outdoor Training 3) Mental Health 4) Youth Programs 5) Team Building. Courses are for Adults and Youth, onsite at our Training Centre, or offsite at your location. All proceeds from the Training Centre go towards supporting programming for the Youth in our Foundation.

== Funding ==
Camp Manitou is a non-profit charitable organization, and strives to provide subsidized, affordable rates to its non-profit user groups. As such, rental revenues cover only a small portion of the costs to run the facilities and programs. The remaining funds must be raised through grants, corporate sponsorship, private donations, special events, and other fundraising initiatives.

Camp Manitou does not receive operational funding from the municipal, provincial, or federal governments.
