= Stéphane Richer (ice hockey defenceman) =

Canadian ice hockey defenceman

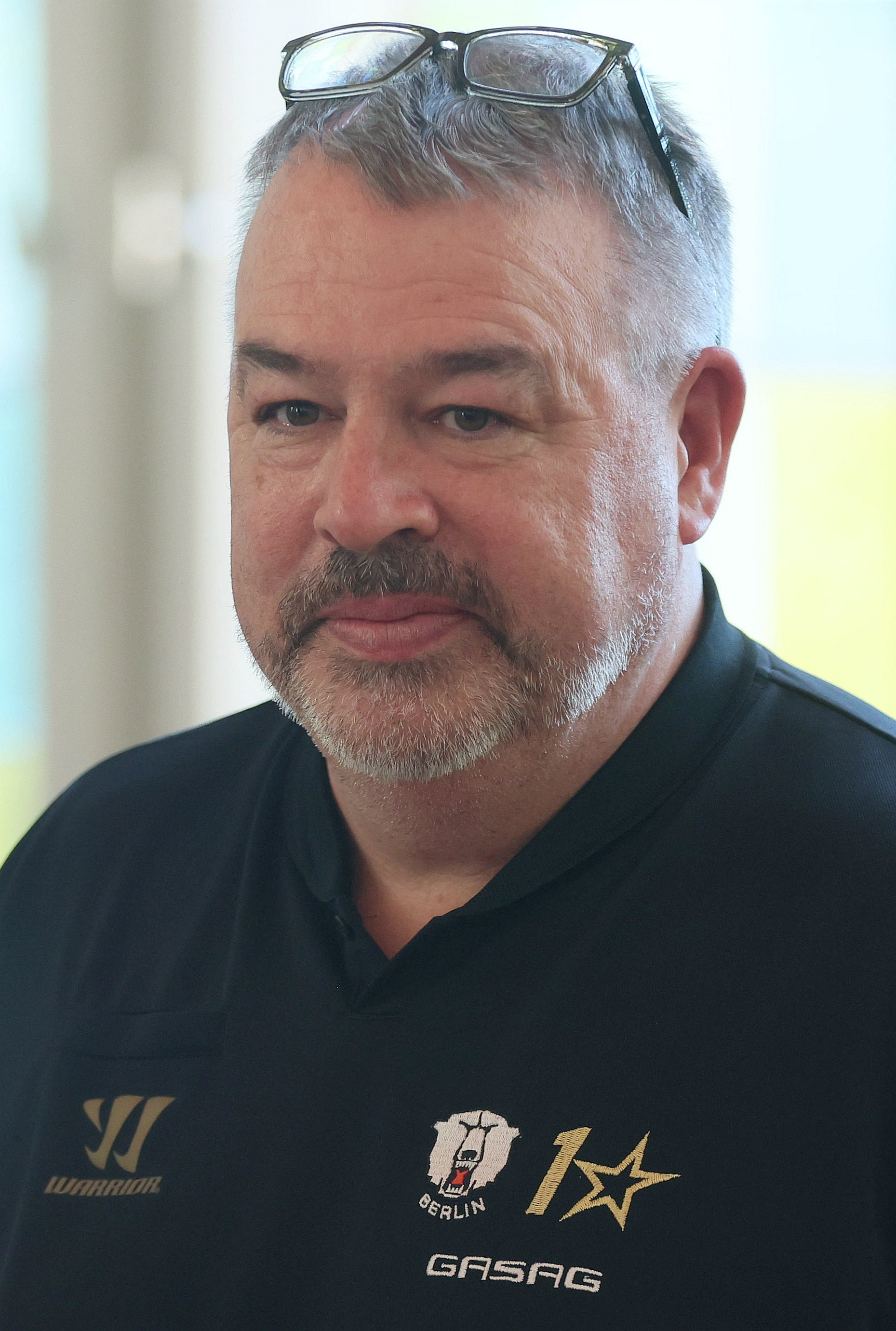
- Stéphane Richer in 2025
- Born: April 28, 1966 (age 60) Hull, Quebec, Canada
- Height: 6 ft 0 in (183 cm)
- Weight: 194 lb (88 kg; 13 st 12 lb)
- Position: Defence
- Shot: Left
- Played for: Tampa Bay Lightning; Boston Bruins; Florida Panthers; Adler Mannheim; Frankfurt Lions
- NHL draft: Undrafted
- Playing career: 1987–2004

Stéphane Jean-Gilles Richer (born April 28, 1966) is a Canadian former professional ice hockey player who is currently serving as sport director at Eisbären Berlin of the Deutsche Eishockey Liga.

== Playing career ==
Richer spent most of his professional career playing in the minors, but did play parts of three seasons in the NHL with the Tampa Bay Lightning (1992–93), Boston Bruins (1992–93), Florida Panthers (1993–94 and 1994–95). He played in 27 NHL games; his NHL totals include one goal, five assists, six points and 20 penalty minutes.

Richer left North America in 1995 to play for Adler Mannheim in Germany. He won the German championship with the Adler squad in 1997, 1998, 1999 and 2001 and remained with the team until the 2001–02 season. Richer spent his final season as a professional hockey player with the Frankfurt Lions before retiring in 2003.

== Coaching career ==
Richer began his coaching career in 2003 as assistant coach of the Frankfurt Lions; he and new head coach Rich Chernomaz led the Lions to a fifth-place regular season finish and a surprise DEL championship in the 2003–04 DEL campaign, defeating the heavily favored Eisbären Berlin in the playoff finals. Richer left the Lions after the season and signed as assistant coach with Adler Mannheim. Midway through the 2004–05 season, he succeeded Helmut de Raaf as head coach. In 2005, Mannheim fired Richer and replaced him with American Greg Poss. Several weeks later, he succeeded Bernhard Engelbrecht as head coach of the Kassel Huskies. Richer guided the Huskies to promotion to the German top-tier Deutsche Eishockey Liga (DEL) in 2008.

On January 6, 2010, he signed a contract as general manager of the Hamburg Freezers, and on March 25, 2010, was named as the club's head coach as well. In December 2010, Richer relinquished the Freezers coaching job to Canadian Benoît Laporte. In 2014, Richer was named DEL Manager of the Year. He signed a contract extension with the Freezers that would keep him with the club until 2019. However, in May 2016, the Freezers folded; Richer, the staff and the players became free agents.

After the Freezers had folded, Richer served as scout for the Los Angeles Kings and worked as director of the youth program at German Oberliga side Crocodiles Hamburg. On January 26, 2017, he was appointed assistant coach to Uwe Krupp for DEL team Eisbären Berlin and promoted to sporting director in May 2017.

== Career statistics ==
			Regular season					Playoffs
Season	Team	League	GP	G	A	Pts	PIM	GP	G	A	Pts	PIM
1983–84	Hull Olympiques	QMJHL	70	8	38	46	42	—	—	—	—	—
1984–85	Hull Olympiques	QMJHL	67	21	56	77	98	5	2	1	3	14
1985–86	Hull Olympiques	QMJHL	71	14	52	66	166	15	1	7	8	17
1986–87	Hull Olympiques	QMJHL	33	6	22	28	74	8	3	4	7	17
1987–88	Baltimore Skipjacks	AHL	22	0	3	3	6	—	—	—	—	—
1987–88	Sherbrooke Canadiens	AHL	41	4	7	11	46	5	1	0	1	10
1988–89	Sherbrooke Canadiens	AHL	70	7	26	33	158	6	1	2	3	18
1989–90	Sherbrooke Canadiens	AHL	60	10	12	22	85	12	4	9	13	16
1990–91	New Haven Nighthawks	AHL	3	0	1	1	0	—	—	—	—	—
1990–91	Phoenix Roadrunners	IHL	67	11	38	49	48	11	4	6	10	6
1991–92	Fredericton Canadiens	AHL	80	17	47	64	74	7	0	5	5	18
1992–93	Atlanta Knights	IHL	3	0	4	4	4	—	—	—	—	—
1992–93	Tampa Bay Lightning	NHL	3	0	0	0	0	—	—	—	—	—
1992–93	Providence Bruins	AHL	53	8	29	37	60	—	—	—	—	—
1992–93	Boston Bruins	NHL	21	1	4	5	18	3	0	0	0	0
1993–94	Cincinnati Cyclones	IHL	66	9	55	64	80	11	2	9	11	26
1993–94	Florida Panthers	NHL	2	0	1	1	0	—	—	—	—	—
1994–95	Cincinnati Cyclones	IHL	80	16	53	69	67	10	2	7	9	18
1994–95	Florida Panthers	NHL	1	0	0	0	2	—	—	—	—	—
1995–96	Mannheim Eagles	DEL	50	11	30	41	62	—	—	—	—	—
1996–97	Mannheim Eagles	DEL	49	10	19	29	65	—	—	—	—	—
1997–98	Mannheim Eagles	DEL	48	6	26	32	66	—	—	—	—	—
1998–99	Mannheim Eagles	DEL	51	13	29	42	90	—	—	—	—	—
1999–00	Mannheim Eagles	DEL	43	10	18	28	46	5	0	2	2	16
2000–01	Mannheim Eagles	DEL	55	8	19	27	72	12	3	7	10	26
2001–02	Mannheim Eagles	DEL	50	1	13	14	58	10	0	5	5	4
2002–03	Frankfurt Lions	DEL	11	0	4	4	12	—	—	—	—	—
NHL totals			27	1	5	6	20	3	0	0	0	0

== Awards and honours ==
Award	Year
AHL
Second All-Star Team	1992
IHL
Second All-Star Team	1994, 1995
DEL
Champion (Adler Mannheim)	1997, 1998, 1999, 2001
Manager of the Year	2014
