= Shane Peacock (ice hockey) =

Canadian ice hockey player

- Born: July 7, 1973 (age 52) Edmonton, Alberta, Canada
- Height: 5 ft 10 in (178 cm)
- Weight: 198 lb (90 kg; 14 st 2 lb)
- Position: Defence
- Shoots: Right
- Played for: Kalamazoo Wings; Düsseldorfer EG; Kassel Huskies; München Barons; Kölner Haie; Hamburg Freezers; Frankfurt Lions; Nürnberg Ice Tigers
- National team: Canada
- NHL draft: 60th overall, 1991; Pittsburgh Penguins
- Playing career: 1994–present

Shane Peacock (born July 7, 1973) is a Canadian professional ice hockey defenseman. He was drafted in the third round, 60th overall, by the Pittsburgh Penguins in the 1991 NHL entry draft.

== Career ==
Peacock started his career with the Lethbridge Hurricanes of the Western Hockey League. After two seasons with the Hurricanes, the Penguins chose to draft Peacock in the 3rd round of the 1991 NHL entry draft, 60th overall. Peacock would remain with the Hurricanes for three more seasons, leading all WHL defensemen in scoring during the 1992–93 and 1993-94 WHL seasons.

Peacock would start his professional career with the Kalamazoo Wings (later Michigan K-Wings) of the International Hockey League. He would leave the K-Wings after the 1996-97 IHL season and continue his career in Germany. Peacock was a member of the München Barons, who won the DEL championship in 1999-2000, and has captained the Nürnberg Ice Tigers since 2009.

== Career statistics ==
			Regular season					Playoffs
Season	Team	League	GP	G	A	Pts	PIM	GP	G	A	Pts	PIM
1989–90	Lethbridge Hurricanes	WHL	65	7	23	30	60	19	2	8	10	42
1990–91	Lethbridge Hurricanes	WHL	69	12	50	62	102	16	1	14	15	26
1991–92	Lethbridge Hurricanes	WHL	67	35	45	80	217	5	2	5	7	2
1992–93	Lethbridge Hurricanes	WHL	65	27	75	102	100	4	4	3	7	2
1993–94	Lethbridge Hurricanes	WHL	70	27	65	92	92	9	3	9	12	6
1994–95	Kalamazoo Wings	IHL	71	13	23	36	42	12	3	5	8	8
1995–96	Michigan K-Wings	IHL	79	24	43	67	26	10	0	4	4	6
1996–97	Michigan K-Wings	IHL	81	9	31	40	49	4	0	2	2	4
1997–98	Düsseldorfer EG	DEL	39	11	18	29	73	3	2	1	3	2
1998–99	Kassel Huskies	DEL	52	15	22	37	46	—	—	—	—	—
1999–00	München Barons	DEL	53	20	32	52	103	12	5	3	8	12
2000–01	München Barons	DEL	41	5	20	25	34	11	6	6	12	14
2001–02	München Barons	DEL	45	10	20	30	69	9	6	4	10	14
2002–03	Kölner Haie	DEL	52	9	14	23	48	15	2	4	6	30
2003–04	Hamburg Freezers	DEL	50	7	12	19	65	11	6	7	13	10
2004–05	Hamburg Freezers	DEL	52	11	29	40	58	3	1	0	1	0
2005–06	Hamburg Freezers	DEL	51	7	30	37	265	6	1	0	1	10
2006–07	Frankfurt Lions	DEL	52	8	23	31	50	8	1	1	2	18
2007–08	Nuremberg Ice Tigers	DEL	38	6	14	20	40	—	—	—	—	—
2008–09	Nuremberg Ice Tigers	DEL	52	5	16	21	70	5	1	3	4	6
2009–10	Nuremberg Ice Tigers	DEL	50	6	12	18	88	5	1	2	3	0
DEL totals			627	120	262	382	1,009	88	32	31	63	116

== Awards ==
- 1999-00 DEL Champion, München Barons
- 2000-01 DEL All-Star
- 2000-01 DEL Best Defenseman, The Hockey News
