= Craig Woodcroft =

Canadian ice hockey player and coach

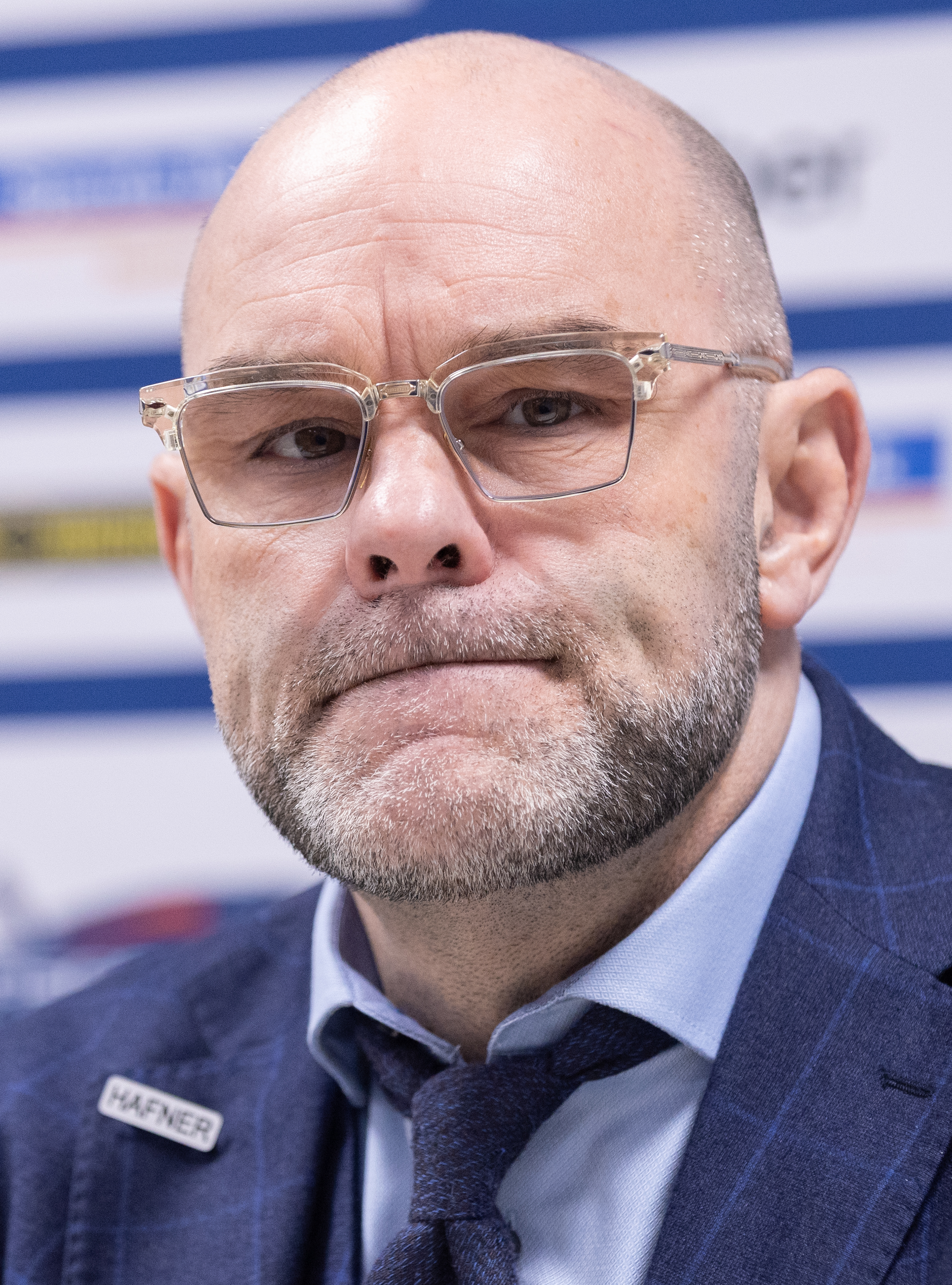
- Craig Woodcroft in 2026
- Born: December 3, 1969 (age 56) Toronto, Ontario, Canada
- Height: 5 ft 11 in (180 cm)
- Weight: 187 lb (85 kg; 13 st 5 lb)
- Position: Forward
- Shot: Left
- Played for: Indianapolis Ice; Prince Edward Island Senators; TuTo Hockey; Cleveland Lumberjacks; Cornwall Aces; Manchester Storm; Kölner Haie; Kassel Huskies; Frankfurt Lions; Essen Mosquitoes; HC Milano; Linköpings HC
- National team: Canada
- NHL draft: 134th overall, 1988; Chicago Blackhawks
- Playing career: 1991–2003

Craig Woodcroft (born December 3, 1969) is a Canadian professional ice hockey head coach and former forward. He is currently serving as head coach of the Straubing Tigers. Woodcroft was previously the head coach of HC Dinamo Minsk of the Kontinental Hockey League (KHL).

During his playing career, he represented Team Canada internationally and spent nine years playing in Europe. He previously coached Adler Mannheim of the Deutsche Eishockey Liga (DEL) and Genève-Servette HC of the National League (NL). His brother Jay was head coach for the Edmonton Oilers of the NHL and his other brother Todd has held various coaching positions in his career as well.

== Playing career ==
Woodcroft amassed 168 points (73 goals, 95 assists) over his four-year NCAA career at Colgate University. Woodcroft was presented with the Colgate Coaches Award in 1989 and hauled in ECACH Tournament MVP distinction the following year, helping the Raiders capture the Eastern Collegiate Athletic Conference championship. As a senior, he was named Colgate's Best Offensive Player and earned All-ECACH Honorable Mention status.

A 1991 graduate of Colgate University, Woodcroft was picked by the Chicago Blackhawks in the 1988 NHL Draft (134th overall). Following playing college hockey, he turned pro and signed with the Indianapolis Ice of the International Hockey League, where he stayed from 1991 to 1993, followed by a stint with the Prince Edward Island Senators of the American Hockey League in 1993-94.

Woodcroft made 12 appearances for Finnish Liiga side TuTo Hockey in 1994-95 and then was sent to lower division team Reipas Lahti on loan, where he saw the ice in three contests, before heading back to North America. He finished the season playing a couple of games for IHL's Cleveland Lumberjacks and strengthening ECHL outfit Columbus Chill in 19 games.

At the beginning of the 1995-96 campaign, Woodcroft took up an offer to play in Germany: Woodcroft parted ways with Deggendorfer EC after two games, but remained in the country to join fellow German second-division team EV Weiden. At Weiden, he produced 13 goals and 22 assists in 28 contests.

After playing briefly for AHL's Cornwall Aces and Colonial Hockey League's Quad City Mallards, Woodcroft embarked on a two-year stint with Manchester Storm of the British Ice Hockey Superleague (BISL). In England, Woodcroft is particularly remembered for a four-goal showing in a 7-0 European Hockey League home win over Czech powerhouse Sparta Praha in the 1997-98 season. He garnered All-BISL First Team honors in his second year with the Storm. That drew the interest of a high caliber team from Germany's top-tier Deutsche Eishockey Liga (DEL), Kölner Haie. He signed with the team for the 1998-99 season, followed by stints with three other DEL teams in the following three years, including the Kassel Huskies, Frankfurt Lions and Moskitos Essen.

Woodcroft concluded his professional career playing in Italy (HC Milan) and Sweden (Linköping HC) in 2002-03.

== Coaching career ==
Woodcroft is the founder of the Northern Edge Hockey Academy. In 2010-11, he served as president of Hockey Operations for the Sioux City Musketeers of the United States Hockey League.

Woodcroft served as Skill Development Coach for the St. Louis Blues from 2010 to 2012 and was director of the Nashville Predators' Rookie Development Camp between 2012 and 2014.

In 2014, Woodcroft signed a two-year deal as associate coach of German DEL side Adler Mannheim. In his first year, serving under head coach Geoff Ward, Woodcroft helped guide the Adler squad to the German championship title. In February 2016, he was promoted to Adler Mannheim head coach after Greg Ireland was fired. Woodcroft left Mannheim after the 2015-16 season and was named head coach of HC Dinamo Minsk of the Kontinental Hockey League (KHL) in April 2016.

On June 26, 2017, it was announced that Woodcroft would become the new head coach of Genève-Servette HC, signing a three-year deal with the team. On July 25, 2017 he was named an assistant coach of Canada's men's team for the 2018 Winter Olympics in Pyeongchang, Korea. Serving as assistant coach to Willie Desjardins, Woodcroft helped Canada win the 2017 Spengler Cup. He guided Genève-Servette to an 8th place finish in the 2017-18 regular season before falling short to defending champion SC Bern in playoff-quarterfinals. Woodcroft was relieved of his duties as Genève-Servette head coach on April 3, 2018. In July 2019, he again signed with HC Dinamo Minsk to begin a second stint as head coach at the club.

Formerly head coach of the Kontinental Hockey League club Dynamo (Minsk), which he led earlier in the 2016/2017 season. He was a member of the coaching staff of the national ice hockey team of Belarus as an assistant coach during three Ice Hockey World Championships. From November 2, 2021, he was the head coach of the Belarus national team.

On February 5, 2025, he was named head coach of the Straubing Tigers in Germany.

== Career statistics ==
			Regular season					Playoffs
Season	Team	League	GP	G	A	Pts	PIM	GP	G	A	Pts	PIM
1987–88	Colgate University	NCAA	29	7	10	17	28	—	—	—	—	—
1988–89	Colgate University	NCAA	29	20	29	49	62	—	—	—	—	—
1989–90	Colgate University	NCAA	37	20	26	46	108	—	—	—	—	—
1990–91	Colgate University	NCAA	32	26	30	56	52	—	—	—	—	—
1991–92	Indianapolis Ice	IHL	75	21	17	38	67	—	—	—	—	—
1992–93	Indianapolis Ice	IHL	65	12	19	31	80	—	—	—	—	—
1993–94	Prince Edward Island Senators	AHL	33	5	9	14	41	—	—	—	—	—
1994–95	TUTO Hockey	Liiga	12	0	0	0	6	—	—	—	—	—
1994–95	Reipas Lahti	I-Divisioona	3	2	0	2	4	—	—	—	—	—
1994–95	Cleveland Lumberjacks	IHL	2	0	0	0	0	—	—	—	—	—
1994–95	Columbus Chill	ECHL	16	7	14	21	22	3	3	1	4	12
1995–96	Deggendorfer EC	Germany2	4	2	3	5	6	—	—	—	—	—
1995–96	EV Weiden	Germany2	28	13	22	35	50	—	—	—	—	—
1995–96	Cornwall Aces	AHL	3	0	0	0	6	—	—	—	—	—
1995–96	Quad City Mallards	CoHL	4	1	3	4	6	4	1	4	5	10
1996–97	Manchester Storm	BISL	41	17	22	39	68	6	1	2	3	2
1997–98	Manchester Storm	BISL	42	17	31	48	79	9	4	5	9	14
1998–99	Kölner Haie	DEL	49	9	11	20	83	5	0	4	4	10
1999–00	Kassel Huskies	DEL	49	11	30	41	60	8	0	6	6	14
2000–01	Frankfurt Lions	DEL	58	7	27	34	93	—	—	—	—	—
2001–02	Moskitos Essen	DEL	58	8	19	27	87	—	—	—	—	—
2002–03	Milano Vipers	Italy	24	8	14	22	42	—	—	—	—	—
2002–03	Linköping HC	SHL	11	0	1	1	28	10	5	5	10	37
IHL totals			142	33	36	69	147	—	—	—	—	—
DEL totals			214	35	87	122	323	13	0	10	10	24
