= Martin Jiranek (ice hockey) =

Canadian ice hockey player (born 1969)

- Born: October 3, 1969 (age 56) Bashaw, Alberta, Canada
- Height: 5 ft 11 in (180 cm)
- Weight: 170 lb (77 kg; 12 st 2 lb)
- Position: Centre
- Shot: Left
- Played for: AHL; Baltimore Skipjacks; Portland Pirates; Italy; HC Gherdëina; DEL; Nürnberg Ice Tigers; ERC Ingolstadt
- NHL draft: 1990 NHL Supplemental Draft; Washington Capitals
- Playing career: 1992–2007

Martin Jiranek (born October 3, 1969) is a Canadian former professional ice hockey player. He is currently an assistant coach for the Fischtown Pinguins.

== Career ==
Jiranek played in the American Hockey League for the Baltimore Skipjacks and Portland Pirates before moving to Europe. He played in the Austrian Hockey League for Kapfenberger SV and in Serie A for HC Gherdëina before spending 11 seasons in the Deutsche Eishockey Liga playing for the Nürnberg Ice Tigers and ERC Ingolstadt.

After retiring, Jiranek was briefly head coach of the Krefeld Pinguine and was the sports manager of the Thomas Sabo Ice Tigers for six seasons.

== Career statistics ==
			Regular season					Playoffs
Season	Team	League	GP	G	A	Pts	PIM	GP	G	A	Pts	PIM
1987–88	Calgary Canucks	AJHL	56	60	57	117	83	—	—	—	—	—
1988–89	Bowling Green State University	NCAA	41	9	18	27	36	—	—	—	—	—
1989–90	Bowling Green State University	NCAA	41	13	21	34	38	—	—	—	—	—
1990–91	Bowling Green State University	NCAA	39	31	23	54	33	—	—	—	—	—
1991–92	Bowling Green State University	NCAA	34	25	28	53	46	—	—	—	—	—
1991–92	Baltimore Skipjacks	AHL	8	2	8	10	0	—	—	—	—	—
1992–93	Baltimore Skipjacks	AHL	64	18	26	44	39	7	1	2	3	23
1993–94	Portland Pirates	AHL	73	15	37	52	75	13	2	4	6	2
1994–95	EC Kapfenberg	Austria	33	37	38	75	22	—	—	—	—	—
1995–96	HC Gherdëina	Italy	31	36	37	73	20	7	2	3	5	2
1996–97	Nürnberg Ice Tigers	DEL	47	25	33	58	18	8	5	5	10	6
1997–98	Nürnberg Ice Tigers	DEL	43	22	29	51	20	5	3	4	7	4
1998–99	Nürnberg Ice Tigers	DEL	47	24	45	69	40	13	6	3	9	6
1999–00	Nürnberg Ice Tigers	DEL	48	13	21	34	26	—	—	—	—	—
2000–01	Nürnberg Ice Tigers	DEL	58	21	31	52	67	4	2	1	3	0
2001–02	Nürnberg Ice Tigers	DEL	56	15	24	39	52	4	0	0	0	4
2002–03	Nürnberg Ice Tigers	DEL	40	12	18	30	78	4	1	1	2	0
2003–04	Nürnberg Ice Tigers	DEL	51	16	19	35	36	6	0	0	0	0
2004–05	ERC Ingolstadt	DEL	51	12	16	28	56	10	2	1	3	8
2005–06	ERC Ingolstadt	DEL	50	10	11	21	38	7	1	1	2	4
2006–07	Nürnberg Ice Tigers	DEL	46	9	16	25	50	13	3	1	4	14
2007–08	EHC 80 Nürnberg	Germany4	24	25	42	67	22	3	3	3	6	2
2010–11	EHC 80 Nürnberg	Germany5	13	23	28	51	24	—	—	—	—	—
AHL totals			145	35	71	106	114	20	3	6	9	25
DEL totals			537	179	263	442	481	74	23	17	40	46

== Awards and honours ==
Award	Year	Ref
CCHA Second All-Star Team	1991–92	
Deutsche Eishockey Liga Most Points	1998–99	
Deutsche Eishockey Liga All-Star Team	2000–01	
