= Robert Cimetta =

Canadian ice hockey player (born 1970)

- Born: February 15, 1970 (age 56) Toronto, Ontario, Canada
- Height: 6 ft 1 in (185 cm)
- Weight: 195 lb (88 kg; 13 st 13 lb)
- Position: Left wing
- Shot: Left
- Played for: Boston Bruins; Toronto Maple Leafs
- NHL draft: 18th overall, 1988; Boston Bruins
- Playing career: 1989–2000

Robert Nicholas "Rob" Cimetta (born February 15, 1970) is a Canadian former professional ice hockey left winger. He played in the National Hockey League with the Boston Bruins and Toronto Maple Leafs between 1988 and 1992. He later spent several years in the Deutsche Eishockey Liga, retiring in 2000.

== Biography ==
Cimetta was born in Toronto, Ontario. As a youth, he played in the 1983 Quebec International Pee-Wee Hockey Tournament with the Toronto Young Nationals minor ice hockey team. He was drafted in the first round, 18th overall, by the Boston Bruins in the 1988 NHL entry draft. He played 103 games in the National Hockey League: 54 with the Bruins and 49 with the Toronto Maple Leafs.

== Personal life ==
Cimetta was in the South Tower of the World Trade Center during the September 11 attacks. He was on the 61st floor in the Morgan Stanley office, and managed to exit the tower before its collapse.

== Career statistics ==
=== Regular season and playoffs ===
			Regular season					Playoffs
Season	Team	League	GP	G	A	Pts	PIM	GP	G	A	Pts	PIM
1986–87	Toronto Marlboros	OHL	66	21	35	56	65	—	—	—	—	—
1987–88	Toronto Marlboros	OHL	64	34	42	76	90	4	2	2	4	7
1988–89	Toronto Marlboros	OHL	58	55	47	102	89	6	3	3	6	0
1988–89	Boston Bruins	NHL	7	2	0	2	0	1	0	0	0	15
1989–90	Boston Bruins	NHL	47	8	9	17	33	—	—	—	—	—
1989–90	Maine Mariners	AHL	9	3	2	5	13	—	—	—	—	—
1990–91	Toronto Maple Leafs	NHL	25	2	4	6	21	—	—	—	—	—
1990–91	Newmarket Saints	AHL	29	16	18	34	24	—	—	—	—	—
1991–92	Toronto Maple Leafs	NHL	24	4	3	7	12	—	—	—	—	—
1991–92	St. John's Maple Leafs	AHL	19	4	13	17	23	10	3	7	10	24
1992–93	St. John's Maple Leafs	AHL	76	28	57	85	125	9	2	10	12	32
1993–94	Indianapolis Ice	IHL	79	26	54	80	178	—	—	—	—	—
1994–95	Adler Mannheim	DEL	39	29	31	60	126	9	6	7	13	62
1995–96	Adler Mannheim	DEL	50	22	41	63	76	1	0	1	1	25
1996–97	Berlin Capitals	DEL	8	4	5	9	16	—	—	—	—	—
1996–97	Adler Mannheim	DEL	36	17	21	38	36	9	13	2	15	14
1997–98	Adler Mannheim	DEL	42	13	20	33	82	5	2	3	5	16
1998–99	Berlin Capitals	DEL	34	11	13	24	94	—	—	—	—	—
1999–00	Berlin Capitals	DEL	49	6	16	22	123	3	0	0	0	10
DEL totals			258	102	147	249	553	27	21	13	34	129
NHL totals			103	16	16	32	66	1	0	0	0	15

=== International ===
Year	Team	Event	GP	G	A	Pts	PIM
1989	Canada	WJC	7	7	4	11	4
Junior totals			7	7	4	11	4

Preceded by Stephane Quintal	Boston Bruins first-round draft pick 1988	Succeeded by Shayne Stevenson
