= Tomas Martinec =

German ice hockey player

- Born: 5 March 1976 (age 50) Pardubice, Czechoslovakia
- Height: 6 ft 0 in (183 cm)
- Weight: 190 lb (86 kg; 13 st 8 lb)
- Position: Left wing
- Shot: Left
- Played for: ESV Kaufbeuren; ETC Timmendorfer Strand; HC Slezan Opava; HC Prerov; Iserlohn Roosters; Adler Mannheim; Nuremberg Ice Tigers; Heilbronner Falken; Mad Dogs Mannheim II; Hannover Scorpions
- National team: Germany
- NHL draft: Undrafted
- Playing career: 1994–2017

Tomáš Martinec (born 5 March 1976) is a retired Czech-German ice hockey player. He competed in the men's tournament at the 2006 Winter Olympics. In 2019 he became the head coach of EA Steiermark U18 of the EBJL in Austria His father is Vladimír Martinec, a Czech ice hockey coach and former player.

== Career statistics ==
=== Regular season and playoffs ===
			Regular season					Playoffs
Season	Team	League	GP	G	A	Pts	PIM	GP	G	A	Pts	PIM
1992–93	ESV Kaufbeuren	DEU U20	8	2	2	4	12	—	—	—	—	—
1994–95	ESV Kaufbeuren	DEU U20	18	9	17	26	48	—	—	—	—	—
1994–95	Kaufbeurer Adler	DEL	27	3	3	6	10	4	0	0	0	2
1995–96	ESV Kaufbeurer	DEU U20	12	15	8	23	62	—	—	—	—	—
1995–96	Kaufbeurer Adler	DEL	49	5	6	11	67	3	1	0	1	16
1996–97	ETC Timmendorfer Strand	DEU.2	47	12	16	28	131	—	—	—	—	—
1997–98	HC Bohemex Trade Opava	ELH	15	1	1	2	18	—	—	—	—	—
1997–98	HC Přerov	CZE.2	31	17	19	36	40	—	—	—	—	—
1998–99	Iserlohner EC	DEU.2	55	8	15	23	181	5	1	0	1	22
1999–2000	Iserlohner EC	DEU.2	47	25	31	56	163	3	2	3	5	10
2000–01	Iserlohn Roosters	DEL	60	22	14	36	159	—	—	—	—	—
2001–02	Iserlohn Roosters	DEL	60	15	25	40	168	—	—	—	—	—
2002–03	Adler Mannheim	DEL	39	8	4	12	148	8	3	3	6	8
2003–04	Adler Mannheim	DEL	51	14	17	31	112	5	0	0	0	20
2004–05	Nürnberg Ice Tigers	DEL	44	14	12	26	178	6	0	2	2	12
2005–06	Nürnberg Ice Tigers	DEL	49	14	18	32	136	4	1	1	2	8
2006–07	Adler Mannheim	DEL	43	5	16	21	113	11	2	2	4	30
2007–08	Adler Mannheim	DEL	55	15	9	24	114	5	3	0	3	10
2008–09	Adler Mannheim	DEL	46	10	9	19	106	8	1	3	4	20
2009–10	Adler Mannheim	DEL	51	5	13	18	103	2	0	0	0	0
2010–11	Heilbronner Falken	DEU.2	46	16	11	27	156	4	0	0	0	29
2015–16	Mad Dogs Mannheim II	DEU.5	—	—	—	—	—	—	—	—	—	—
2016–17	Hannover Scorpions	DEU.3	4	0	1	1	12	—	—	—	—	—
DEL totals			574	130	146	276	1,414	56	11	11	22	126

=== International ===
Year	Team	Event	GP	G	A	Pts	PIM
2002	Germany	WC	1	0	0	0	2
2003	Germany	WC	7	1	0	1	6
2004	Germany	WC	6	0	0	0	10
2004	Germany	WCH	3	0	0	0	2
2005	Germany	WC	6	2	0	2	6
2006	Germany	OG	5	1	0	1	2
Senior totals			28	4	0	4	28
