= Jan Alston =

Canadian ice hockey player

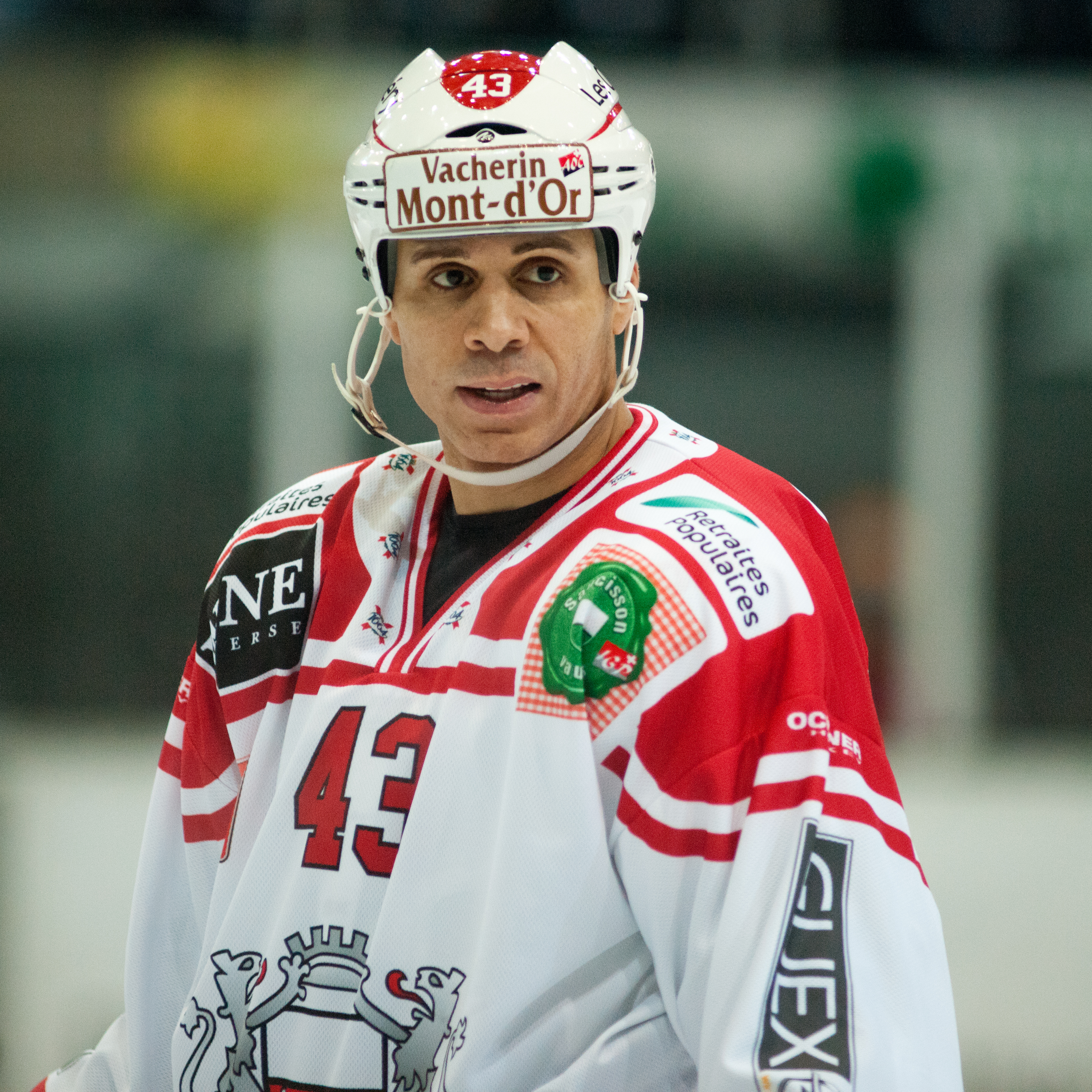
- Born: April 14, 1969 (age 56); Granby, Quebec, Canada
- Height: 5 ft 10 in (178 cm)
- Weight: 193.6 lb (88 kg; 13 st 12 lb)
- Position: Centre
- Shot: Right
- Played for: ZSC Lions; EHC Biel; HC Davos; HC La Chaux-de-Fonds; HC Lausanne
- National team: Canada
- NHL draft: Undrafted
- Playing career: 1990–2011

Jan Alston (born April 14, 1969) is a Canadian-Swiss ice hockey executive, coach and former professional ice hockey centre. He was granted Swiss citizenship in 2002.

He became sport director at Swiss side Lausanne HC in 2011.

== Playing career ==
A native of Granby, Alston skated at the QMAAA and QMJHL level in his home province of Quebec and then spent his entire pro career in Europe, suiting up in Italy, Germany and Switzerland.

He launched his professional career in Italy in 1990 at third-division side Eppan. Over the years, he would gradually work his way up the ladder and spend 12 years in one of the most competitive leagues in Europe, the Swiss National League A (NLA).

Until 1994, Alston mostly played in Italy and signed with EHC Biel of the NLA for the 1994-95 campaign. He quickly made his scoring presence felt in the Swiss top-flight, tallying 28 goals and 23 assists (36 games) for Biel. After one year each at fellow NLA teams HC Davos and HC La Chaux-de-Fonds, Alston headed to Germany, joining the Berlin Capitals of the country's top-tier division, Deutsche Eishockey Liga (DEL), for the 1997-98 season. He transferred from Berlin to Adler Mannheim after one year and helped the team win the German championship in his first season (1998–99). Alston led the DEL in scoring (55 games: 31 goals, 43 assists) the following year, en route to being named DEL Player of the Year. After winning a second German championship with Mannheim in 2000-01, he returned to Switzerland, signing with NLA team ZSC Lions. In nine years with the Lions, Alston played a crucial role in their run to the 2008 Swiss championship and in winning the Champions Hockey League in 2009. He had two more appearances in the NLA finals with ZSC and also served as an assistant captain for several years.

Alston spent the last season (2010–11) of his playing career at NLB side Lausanne HC, while also serving as playing assistant to head coach John Van Boxmeer.

== Managing career ==
In November 2011, Alston put pen to paper on a five-year deal as sport director at Lausanne HC of Switzerland. He signed a five-year contract extension in December 2015.

== Career statistics ==
			Regular season					Playoffs
Season	Team	League	GP	G	A	Pts	PIM	GP	G	A	Pts	PIM
1986–87	Saint-Jean Castors	QMJHL	68	20	32	52	30	8	4	3	7	9
1987–88	Saint-Jean Castors	QMJHL	69	39	38	77	46	7	5	0	5	10
1988–89	Saint-Jean Castors	QMJHL	69	58	86	144	115	4	6	9	15	0
1989–90	Saint-Jean Lynx	QMJHL	65	61	74	135	139	—	—	—	—	—
1990–91	HC Eppan Pirates	ITA III	—	142	—	—	—	—	—	—	—	—
1991–92	WSV Sterzing Broncos	ITA II	24	47	36	83	28	—	—	—	—	—
1991–92	Lausanne HC	SUI II	4	8	7	15	2	—	—	—	—	—
1992–93	EV MAK Bruneck	ITA	16	21	15	36	14	3	4	0	4	8
1992–93	EV MAK Bruneck	Alp	—	29	27	56	—	—	—	—	—	—
1993–94	HC Varese	ITA	26	27	28	55	26	—	—	—	—	—
1993–94	HC Varese	Alp	—	25	25	50	—	—	—	—	—	—
1994–95	EHC Biel-Bienne	NDA	36	28	23	51	48	—	—	—	—	—
1995–96	HC Davos	NDA	35	29	21	50	52	5	1	2	3	4
1996–97	HC La Chaux-de-Fonds	NDA	20	9	10	19	36	—	—	—	—	—
1997–98	Berlin Capitals	DEL	38	14	22	36	51	4	2	2	4	0
1998–99	Adler Mannheim	DEL	45	33	20	53	32	12	4	7	11	10
1999–2000	Adler Mannheim	DEL	55	31	43	74	36	5	2	4	6	4
2000–01	Adler Mannheim	DEL	59	26	28	54	32	12	10	15	25	4
2001–02	ZSC Lions	NLA	29	8	9	17	20	17	7	2	9	14
2001–02	GCK Lions	SUI II	3	3	2	5	16	—	—	—	—	—
2002–03	ZSC Lions	NLA	43	15	28	43	45	12	5	3	8	16
2003–04	ZSC Lions	NLA	45	22	31	53	36	13	5	4	9	8
2004–05	ZSC Lions	NLA	37	15	24	39	28	15	11	13	24	10
2005–06	ZSC Lions	NLA	37	15	29	44	32	—	—	—	—	—
2006–07	ZSC Lions	NLA	40	11	15	26	64	7	3	3	6	4
2007–08	ZSC Lions	NLA	42	9	19	28	20	17	7	8	15	31
2008–09	ZSC Lions	NLA	50	14	20	34	46	4	0	0	0	2
2009–10	ZSC Lions	NLA	49	21	24	45	48	7	2	4	6	12
2010–11	Lausanne HC	SUI II	45	16	28	44	47	17	1	3	4	4
NDA/NLA totals			463	196	253	449	465	113	45	49	94	139
DEL totals			197	104	113	217	151	33	18	28	46	18
