= Teal Fowler =

American ice hockey player (born 1970)

- Born: December 11, 1970 (age 55) Batavia, New York, United States
- Height: 5 ft 9 in (175 cm)
- Weight: 178 lb (81 kg; 12 st 10 lb)
- Position: Forward
- Played for: EHC Westfalen Dortmund (Germany); EC Königsborn (Germany); Iserlohner EC (Germany)
- NHL draft: Undrafted
- Playing career: 1995–2001

Teal Fowler (born December 11, 1970) is a former ice hockey player.

== Career ==
After playing college hockey for the Merrimack College, he went to Germany and played for minor league teams in Dortmund, Königborn and Iserlohn before being promoted with the Iserlohn team to the German elite league DEL in 2000.

== Coaching career ==
After retiring as player he was an assistant coach with the Iserlohn team. In the 2005–06 season he was head-coach with the DEL team Krefeld Pinguine before joining the Adler Mannheim organization in 2006. He first was assistant coach to Greg Pose and took part in the championship win in 2007. Fowler later assisted Dave King (from December 2007 on) and became head coach after Dave King was released of his duties on February 28, 2009.

In spring 2009, he also joined the coaching staff of the German national team as video coach. In January 2010, he returned to Adler Mannheim for a second spell as head coach. He replaced Doug Mason.

In April 2010, Fowler was named manager of Adler Mannheim. His responsibilities included recruiting, marketing and scouting. He was sacked on December 4, 2017, along with head coach Sean Simpson and assistant coach Colin Muller due to unsatisfactory results.
