= Ron Pasco =

Canadian ice hockey player and coach

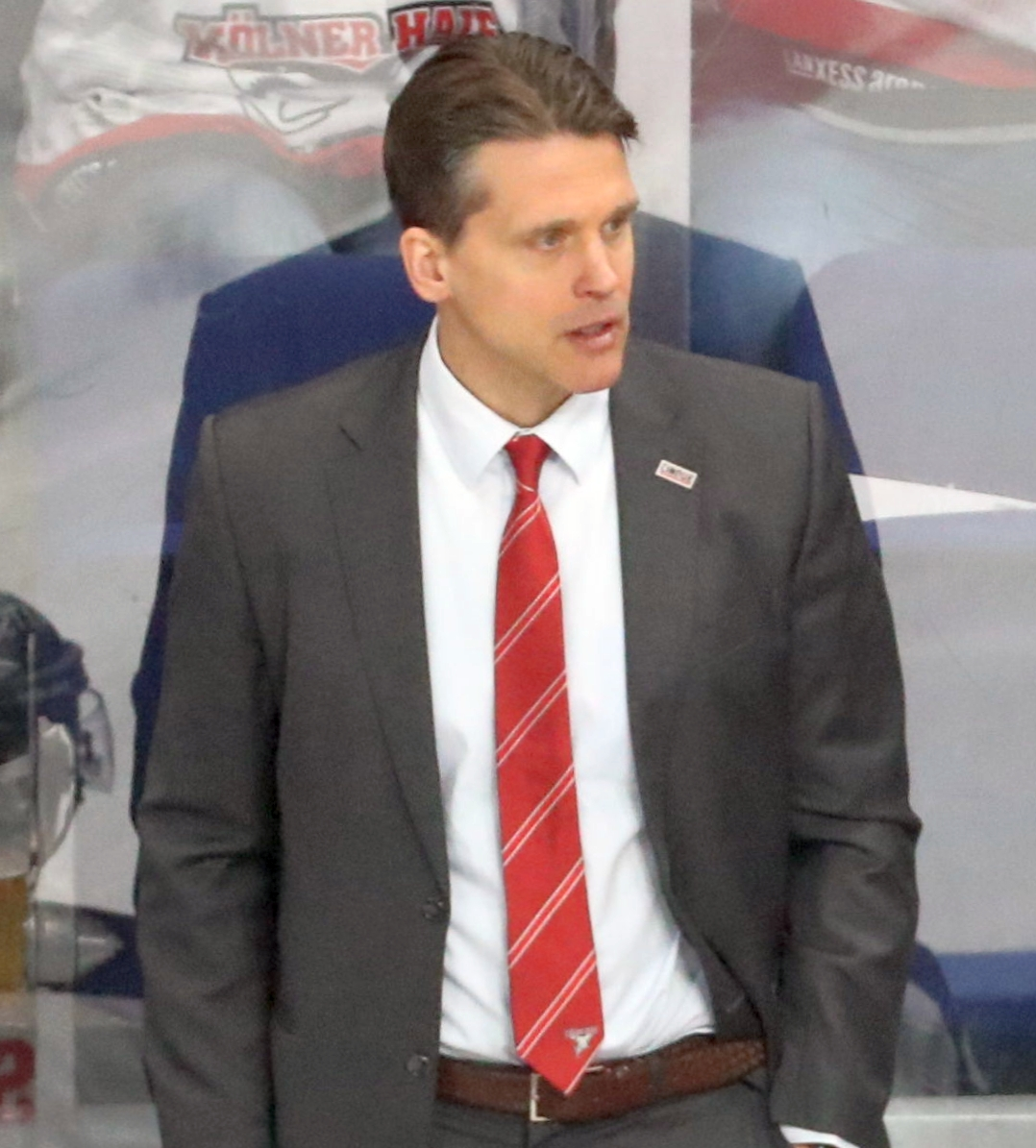
- Born: February 3, 1972 (age 54) Ottawa, Ontario, Canada
- Height: 6 ft 0 in (183 cm)
- Weight: 194 lb (88 kg; 13 st 12 lb)
- Position: Centre
- Shot: Left
- Played for: Adler Mannheim; Kassel Huskies; Kölner Haie; EC VSV; Rødovre Mighty Bulls
- National team: Canada
- NHL draft: Undrafted
- Playing career: 1994–2011

Ron Pasco (born February 3, 1972) is a Canadian professional ice hockey coach and former player. He is the assistant coach for Kölner Haie of the Deutsche Eishockey Liga (DEL) and the head coach for the Lithuania men's national ice hockey team.

== Playing career ==
Pasco attended Rensselaer Polytechnic Institute where he played NCAA Division I ice hockey with the RPI Engineers.

He turned professional with the 1994–95 season, initially suiting up with the Greensboro Monarchs of the ECHL, before transferring to the Tallahassee Tiger Sharks. He played the following year (1995–96) with IHL's Utah Grizzlies and then spent the 1996–97 season with the Canada men's national ice hockey team, before pursuing his professional career in Europe.

Pasco played for Adler Mannheim, Kassel Huskies, Kölner Haie, Schwenninger Wild Wings of Germany, Villacher SV and ATSE Graz of Austria, Danish side Rødovre and IF Troja-Ljungby of during his 13-year career in Europe.

In Germany, he won three Deutsche Eishockey Liga championships with Adler Mannheim.

== Coaching career ==
He began his career behind the bench in the youth ranks of German team Kölner Haie and was appointed as assistant coach of the club's Deutsche Eishockey Liga (DEL) squad in May 2014. However, in October 2014, the entire Haie coaching staff, including Pasco, was relieved of its duties.

On February 18, 2016, he was named assistant coach of Adler Mannheim of the DEL and stayed in that job until the end of the 2015–16 season. On July 5, 2016, he was added to the coaching staff of HC Dinamo Minsk of the Kontinental Hockey League (KHL), just like in Mannheim serving as an assistant to Craig Woodcroft. He stayed in Minsk until the end of the 2016–17 season.

On February 8, 2018, Pasco was named assistant coach of Lausanne HC of the National League (NL).

On June 14, 2019, Pasco re-joined Kölner Haie as assistant coach.

On January 21, 2020, Pasco was named head coach of the Lithuania men's national team after Daniel Lacroix joined the Moncton Wildcats of the Quebec Major Junior Hockey League (QMJHL).

== Awards and honors ==
Award	Year	Ref
All-ECAC Hockey Second Team	1993–94	
