= Felix Petermann =

German ice hockey player

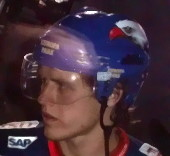
- Felix Petermann
- Born: April 11, 1984 (age 41); Füssen, West Germany
- Height: 6 ft 0 in (183 cm)
- Weight: 198 lb (90 kg; 14 st 2 lb)
- Position: Defence
- Shot: Left
- Played for: Thomas Sabo Ice Tigers; Adler Mannheim; EHC München; EV Füssen
- National team: Germany
- NHL draft: Undrafted
- Playing career: 2000–2015

Felix Petermann (born April 11, 1984) is a German professional ice hockey defenceman. He is currently an unrestricted free agent who last played as captain for EHC München in the Deutsche Eishockey Liga (DEL).

== Career statistics ==
			Regular season					Playoffs
Season	Team	League	GP	G	A	Pts	PIM	GP	G	A	Pts	PIM
1999–00	EV Füssen U18	Jugend-BL	30	14	19	33	78	—	—	—	—	—
1999–00	EV Füssen U20	Junioren-BL	6	1	1	2	8	—	—	—	—	—
2000–01	EV Füssen	Germany3	39	1	2	3	65	—	—	—	—	—
2001–02	EV Füssen U20	Junioren-BL	2	0	0	0	25	—	—	—	—	—
2001–02	EV Füssen	Germany3	31	0	3	3	42	—	—	—	—	—
2002–03	EV Füssen U20	Junioren-BL	1	0	0	0	12	—	—	—	—	—
2002–03	EV Füssen	Germany3	47	16	25	41	80	3	1	1	2	4
2003–04	Nürnberg Ice Tigers	DEL	47	0	7	7	56	6	0	0	0	8
2004–05	Nürnberg Ice Tigers	DEL	51	0	4	4	72	6	0	0	0	12
2005–06	Nürnberg Ice Tigers	DEL	50	4	5	9	113	4	0	1	1	10
2006–07	Adler Mannheim	DEL	52	4	6	10	60	11	1	0	1	30
2007–08	Adler Mannheim	DEL	54	1	4	5	103	5	0	0	0	6
2008–09	Adler Mannheim	DEL	52	3	7	10	62	9	0	1	1	26
2009–10	Adler Mannheim	DEL	48	1	10	11	105	—	—	—	—	—
2010–11	EHC München	DEL	25	2	8	10	30	—	—	—	—	—
2011–12	EHC München	DEL	50	3	7	10	68	—	—	—	—	—
2012–13	EHC München	DEL	41	1	12	13	48	—	—	—	—	—
2013–14	EHC München	DEL	47	4	5	9	56	—	—	—	—	—
2014–15	EHC München	DEL	23	0	5	5	8	—	—	—	—	—
DEL totals			540	23	80	103	781	41	1	2	3	92
