= Devin Edgerton =

Canadian ice hockey player

- Born: June 11, 1970 (age 55) Kindersley, Saskatchewan, Canada
- Height: 5 ft 11 in (180 cm)
- Weight: 175 lb (79 kg; 12 st 7 lb)
- Position: Centre
- Shot: Left
- Played for: Peoria Rivermen; Atlanta Knights; Phoenix Roadrunners; SC Herisau; EV Zug; Frankfurt Lions; Adler Mannheim; EC VSV
- Playing career: 1991–2008

Devin Edgerton (born June 11, 1970) is a Canadian former ice hockey centre.

== Career ==
Edgerton played junior hockey with the Humboldt Broncos of the Saskatchewan Junior Hockey League from 1989 to 1991. In the 1990–91 season, he scored 71 goals and 93 assists for 164 points in 67 games as he was named the SJHL's Most Valuable Player.

He turned professional in 1991 and spent the next five seasons playing in the East Coast Hockey League and the International Hockey League. He played for the Winston-Salem Thunderbirds, Wheeling Thunderbirds, Peoria Rivermen, Atlanta Knights, Knoxville Cherokees and Phoenix Roadrunners.

In 1996, Edgerton would leave North America and spend the remainder of his career in the European leagues. He first played for SC Herisau of the Nationalliga B in Switzerland where he scored 40 goals and 40 assists to help them win promotion to Nationalliga A. He would spend a second season with Herisau before joining EV Zug in 1998.

In 1999, he joined the Frankfurt Lions of Germany's Deutsche Eishockey Liga for one season before spending the next six seasons with Adler Mannheim between 2000 and 2006. He won the DEL Championship in 2001 and also made the DEL All-Star Game that season. He moved to the Erste Bank Eishockey Liga in 2006 with EC VSV where he played two seasons before retiring in 2008.
