= Colin Muller =

Canadian-born Swiss ice hockey player and coach

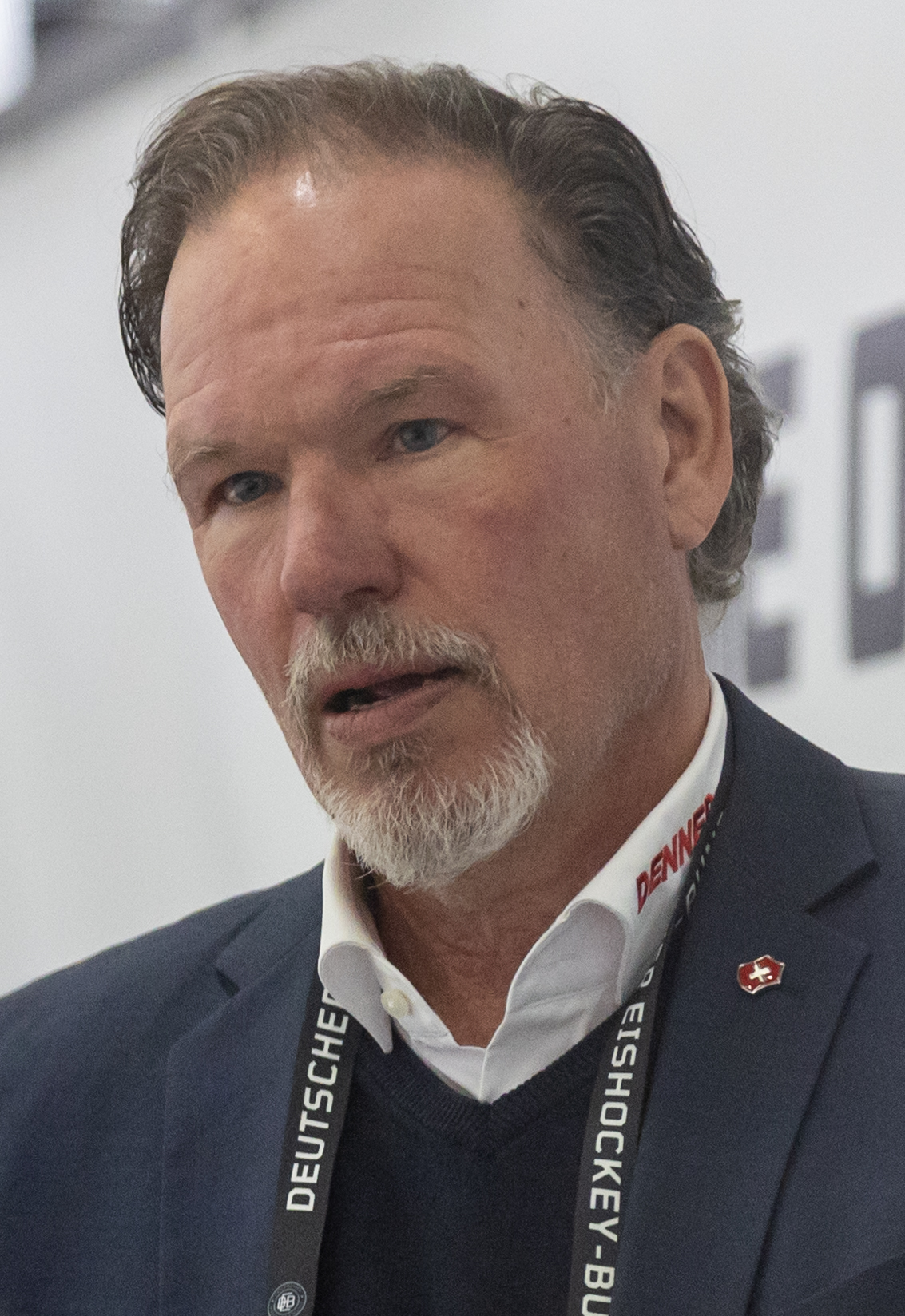
- Muller in 2026
- Born: December 1, 1963 (age 62) Toronto, Ontario, Canada
- Height: 5 ft 10 in (178 cm)
- Weight: 187 lb (85 kg; 13 st 5 lb)
- Position: Left wing
- Shot: Left
- Played for: NLA; EV Zug; HC Fribourg-Gottéron
- National team: Switzerland
- NHL draft: Undrafted
- Playing career: 1984–2001

Colin Muller (born December 1, 1963) is a Canadian-born Swiss professional ice hockey coach and former professional ice hockey player. Muller played ice hockey in the Swiss A league from 1983 to 2000 and has been coaching in Switzerland since 2000. He is currently serving as the head coach of the Swiss women's national team.

== Playing career ==
Muller spent most of his playing career at EV Zug. In 1986–87, his first year at EVZ, he contributed to the team earning promotion to the Swiss National League A (NLA). Muller would win the Swiss championship with Zug in 1998 and moved to HC Fribourg-Gottéron in 1999 before retiring from playing in 2000. He played a total of 544 NLA games, scoring 203 goals.

== Coaching career ==
Muller's coaching career started in 2000 when he became head coach for HC Fribourg-Gottéron. He then joined the coaching staff at SC Rapperswil-Jona between 2000 and 2001, and later was head coach from 2002 to 2003 again with HC Fribourg-Gottéron.

From 2003 to 2008, Muller served as assistant coach to Sean Simpson at EV Zug. The duo moved on to coach ZSC Lions from 2008 to 2010. In 2009 ZSC won the Victoria Cup challenge against the Chicago Blackhawks of the National Hockey League. The ZSC Lions won the game 2–1. Sean Simpson moved on to the role of head coach of the Swiss men's national team. and Muller was promoted for a short stint as head coach in 2010.

Muller was head coach of NLB team EHC Olten from 2011 to 2012. After serving as assistant coach of the Swiss men's national team during the 2011 World Championship, Muller was handed further responsibilities by the Swiss ice hockey federation. He coached the under-20 squad, while continuing as assistant of the men's national team, again working as an assistant coach to Sean Simpson. In 2013 they won the silver medal, the first for Switzerland since they won bronze in 1953. They coached together at the 2014 World Championships as well as at the 2014 Winter Olympics.

He was Simpson's assistant again in 2014–15 at Lokomotiv Yaroslavl of the Kontinental Hockey League. In 2014–2016, he followed Simpson again, being named assistant coach for the Kloten Flyers when Simpson became head coach of the club in December 2014. After the club announced budget cuts and was taken over by a new owner, Muller's contract was mutually ended with the Flyers in May 2016. Later that month, he was named assistant coach of Adler Mannheim of the Deutsche Eishockey Liga (DEL) in Germany, again as assistant coach to Simpson. Their contracts ended in 2017.

In February 2019, he was named assistant coach of the Swiss women's national team. In July 2019, he became the head coach. He is the only Swiss women's coach to have led his team to the medal round in each of the last four major championships including the 2022 Olympics and the 2021, 2022 and 2023 World Championships. The Team finished fifth in the 2024 and 2025 World Championships. In addition to the women's national team, he has served as assistant coach for the Swiss national U20 men's squad at the 2022 Worlds Championships in Halifax, as well as an advisor to the U18 women's national team. His contract was extended and he is currently preparing the women's national team for the 2025 World Championships and the 2026 Olympics. After many years of hard work, the Team won a hard earned 2026 Olympic Bronze medal in Milan. Along with the silver in the 2013 Mens World Championships, he becomes the only Coach to medal at the world level in both Men's and Women's Championships.
