= Greg Poss =

American ice hockey player and coach

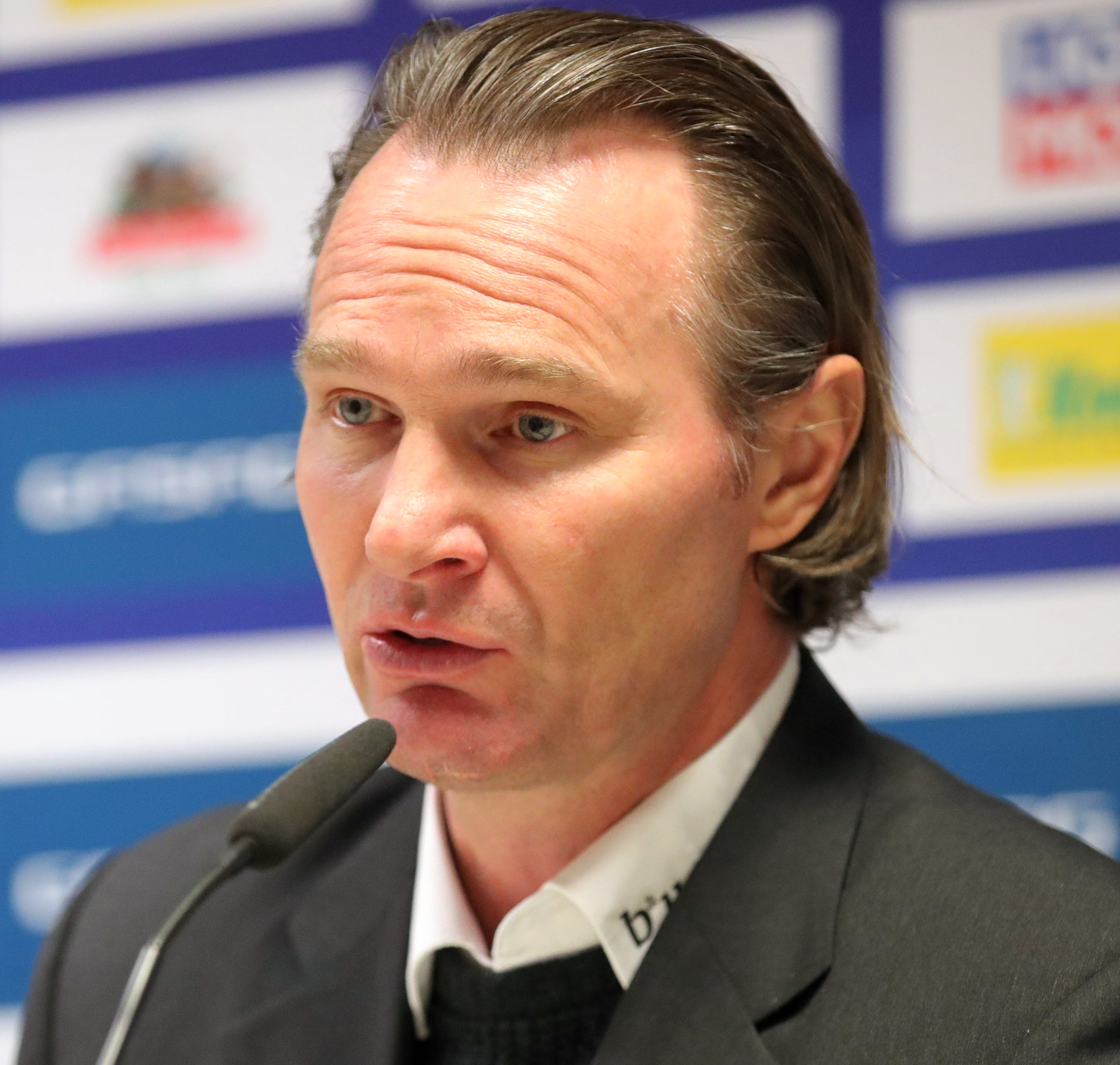
- Coach Greg Poss, 2022
- Born: August 6, 1965 (age 61) Green Bay, WI, USA
- Height: 6 ft 1 in (185 cm)
- Weight: 175 lb (79 kg; 12 st 7 lb)
- Position: Forward
- Shot: Left
- Played for: AHL; Maine Mariners; IHL; Peoria Rivermen
- Playing career: 1989–1992

Greg Poss (born August 6, 1965, in Green Bay, Wisconsin) is a former American hockey player and coach. He was most recently the head coach of the EC Red Bull Salzburg of the Austrian Hockey League.

== Playing career ==
Poss began his career with the Dubuque Fighting Saints in the United States Hockey League. He then played four years for the University of Wisconsin men's ice hockey team. In 1989 he made his professional debut in the American Hockey League for the Maine Mariners . After two seasons, he joined the International Hockey League with the Peoria Rivermen. After a serious knee injury he had to finish his playing career.

== Coaching career ==
=== Germany ===
Poss' primary experience with head coaching is in the top-tier hockey league of Germany, the Deutsche Eishockey Liga, where he coached the Iserlohn Roosters, the Nürnberg Ice Tigers and Adler Mannheim. From October 2004 to November 2005 he was also head coach of the German national ice hockey team. Poss coached in the DEL through 2008.

=== United States ===
Poss served as assistant coach of the Ontario Reign for the 2009–10 ECHL season. He signed a two-year contract with the Florida Everblades starting with the 2010–11 ECHL season. In Florida, Poss continued the Everblades' streak of consecutive post-season appearances until it ended in the 2013–14 season. In the 2011 Kelly Cup playoffs, his Everblades were eliminated in the 1st round by the eventual East Division Champions, the Kalamazoo Wings. In the 2012 Kelly Cup playoffs, he guided the Everblades to their first-ever Kelly Cup, defeating the Ryan Mougenel-led Las Vegas Wranglers 4–1.

On May 26, 2016, Poss left the Everblades to become the head coach of EC Red Bull Salzburg in the Austrian Hockey League. He guided Salzburg to a Champions Hockey League semifinal apperance during the 2018-2019 season before parting ways with the club in late February 2019.

== Statistics ==
=== Playing ===
			Regular season					Playoffs
Season	Team	League	GP	G	A	Pts	PIM	GP	G	A	Pts	PIM
1985–86	Univ. of Wisconsin	WCHA	3	0	0	0	0
1986–87	Univ. of Wisconsin	WCHA	20	0	2	2	12
1987–88	Univ. of Wisconsin	WCHA	40	2	12	14	44
1988–89	Univ. of Wisconsin	WCHA	38	5	4	9	32
1989–90	Maine Mariners	AHL	50	8	8	16	54
1990–91	Maine Mariners	AHL	59	9	19	28	49	1	0	1	1	0
1991–92	Peoria Rivermen	IHL	18	1	4	5	41
WCHA totals			101	7	18	25	88
AHL totals			109	17	27	44	103	1	0	1	1	0
IHL totals			18	1	4	5	41

=== Coaching ===
Season	Team	League	Results
1996–97	EHC Timmendorfer Strand	1. Eishockey Liga	3rd place
1997–98	Iserlohner EC	1. Eishockey Liga	3rd place
1998–99	Iserlohner EC	Eishockey Bundesliga	4th place
1999–00	Iserlohner EC	2. Eishockey-Bundesliga	6th place
2000–01	Iserlohn Roosters	DEL	15th place, Out of playoffs
2001–02	Iserlohn Roosters	DEL	12th place, Out of playoffs
2002–03	Iserlohn Roosters	DEL	9th place, Out of playoffs
2003–04	Nürnberg Ice Tigers	DEL	2nd place
2004–05	Nürnberg Ice Tigers	DEL	3rd place
2005–06	Adler Mannheim	DEL	10th place
2006–07	Adler Mannheim	DEL	League champions
2007–08	Adler Mannheim	DEL	Released 22 December
2009–10	Ontario Reign (ass't coach)	ECHL	Out of playoffs
2010–11	Florida Everblades	ECHL	Lost in 1st round
2011–12	Florida Everblades	ECHL	Won Kelly Cup
2012–13	Florida Everblades	ECHL	Lost in 2nd round
2013–14	Florida Everblades	ECHL	Out of playoffs
2014–15	Florida Everblades	ECHL	Lost in 2nd round
2015–16	Florida Everblades	ECHL	Lost in 1st round
2016–17	EC Red Bull Salzburg	EBEL	Lost in 2nd round
2017–18	EC Red Bull Salzburg	EBEL	Lost in 3rd round
2018–19	EC Red Bull Salzburg	EBEL	Replaced by Andreas Brucker on February 26
