= Bruno Guttowski =

German ice hockey player

- Born: 8 November 1924; Rastenburg, Germany
- Died: 4 July 1977 (aged 52); Mannheim, West Germany
- Position: Defenseman
- Played for: KEV Krefeld; MERC Mannheim
- National team: West Germany
- Playing career: 1951–1964

Bruno Guttowski (8 November 1924 — 4 July 1977) was a German ice hockey player. He won the German championship with KEV in 1952 and was said to be one of the best defensemen in Germany three times. In 1955, he moved to Mannheim, where he started as coach of the MERC. The following season, he joined the team as a defenceman and scored 71 goals for Mannheim in 8 seasons. When scoring his last goal in 1964, he was 39 years, one month and 28 days old and remains, as of 2013, the oldest scorer of the MERC.

Guttowski participated in 58 matches and 10 world championships for his national team. He represented Germany in the 1956 Winter Olympics. Guttowski died in 1977 at the age of 52. He is member of the Hockey Hall of Fame Germany. On November 23. 2012 the Adler Mannheim retired his #12.
