= Ronny Arendt =

German ice hockey player

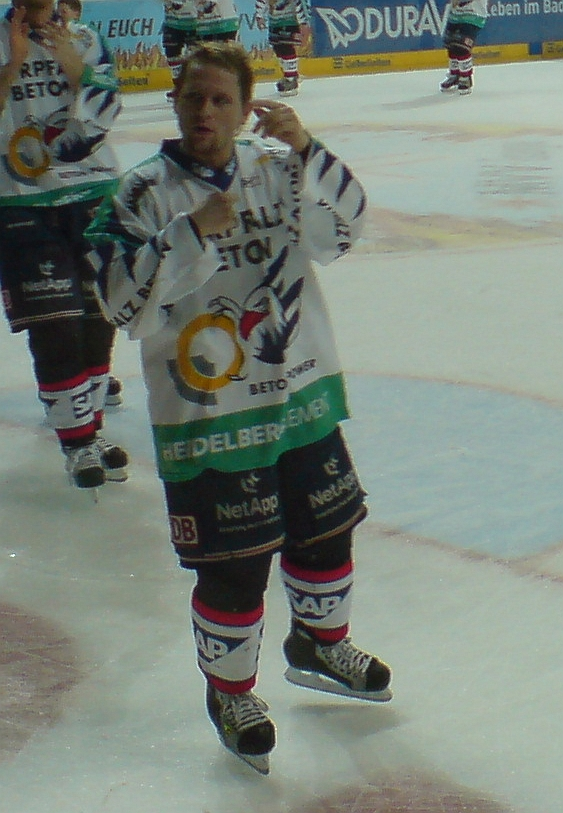
- Born: November 24, 1980 (age 44); Bad Muskau, East Germany
- Height: 5 ft 8 in (173 cm)
- Weight: 192 lb (87 kg; 13 st 10 lb)
- Position: Forward
- Shot: Left
- Played for: Berlin Capitals; Augsburger Panther; Adler Mannheim
- Playing career: 1998–2017

Ronny Arendt (born November 24, 1980) is a German former professional ice hockey player who most notably played for Adler Mannheim in the Deutsche Eishockey Liga (DEL). He also played with the Berlin Capitals and Augsburger Panther.

After completing his 12th season with Adler Mannheim in the 2016–17 season, Arendt announced his retirement from professional hockey after 19 seasons on March 28, 2017. He would remain with the club, in a physical trainer role for the playing team.

== Career statistics ==
=== Regular season and playoffs ===
			Regular season					Playoffs
Season	Team	League	GP	G	A	Pts	PIM	GP	G	A	Pts	PIM
1998–99	ES Weisswasser	2.GBun	48	8	9	17	14	—	—	—	—	—
1999–00	EC Iserlohner	2.GBun	50	3	5	8	26	—	—	—	—	—
2000–01	ES Weisswasser	2.GBun	49	17	30	47	88	6	1	1	2	6
2001–02	Berlin Capitals	DEL	59	6	12	18	10	—	—	—	—	—
2002–03	Augsburger Panther	DEL	52	13	6	19	38	—	—	—	—	—
2002–03	Augsburger EV	3.GBun	4	5	4	9	14	—	—	—	—	—
2003–04	Augsburger Panther	DEL	50	16	6	22	36	—	—	—	—	—
2003–04	Villard-de-lans	FRA	—	—	—	—	—	4	0	1	1	2
2004–05	Augsburger Panther	DEL	48	13	18	31	61	5	0	1	1	6
2005–06	Adler Mannheim	DEL	52	6	10	16	26	—	—	—	—	—
2006–07	Adler Mannheim	DEL	51	10	9	19	84	11	0	3	3	4
2007–08	Adler Mannheim	DEL	56	11	13	24	52	5	1	0	1	0
2008–09	Adler Mannheim	DEL	52	3	10	13	56	9	2	1	3	22
2009–10	Adler Mannheim	DEL	54	9	12	21	32	2	0	0	0	0
2010–11	Adler Mannheim	DEL	48	10	14	24	26	6	3	2	5	10
2011–12	Adler Mannheim	DEL	52	13	19	32	24	14	2	2	4	22
2012–13	Adler Mannheim	DEL	43	7	15	22	16	6	0	0	0	4
2013–14	Adler Mannheim	DEL	52	12	16	28	10	5	1	1	2	0
2014–15	Adler Mannheim	DEL	51	10	17	27	18	13	2	3	5	8
2015–16	Adler Mannheim	DEL	47	5	9	14	72	2	0	0	0	0
2016–17	Adler Mannheim	DEL	51	7	10	17	14	7	1	1	2	6
DEL totals			818	151	196	347	575	92	13	16	29	86

=== International ===
Year	Team	Event	GP	G	A	Pts	PIM
1999	Germany	WJC-D1	6	1	0	1	8
2000	Germany	WJC-D1	5	0	4	4	0
Junior totals			11	1	4	5	8
