= Adler Mannheim =

German professional ice hockey team

- City: Mannheim, Germany
- League: Deutsche Eishockey Liga
- Founded: 1938; 88 years ago
- Home arena: SAP Arena (capacity: 13,600)
- Colours: Blue, white, red
- Owner: Die Adler Mannheim Eishockey Spielbetriebs GmbH + Co. KG
- General manager: Dallas Eakins
- Head coach: Dallas Eakins
- Captain: Marc Michaelis
- Website: adler-mannheim.de

Franchise history
- 1938–1994: Mannheimer Eis- und Rollsport-Club (MERC)
- 1994–today: Adler Mannheim

Championships
- Playoff championships: 8 (1980, 1997, 1998, 1999, 2001, 2007, 2015, 2019)

The Adler Mannheim (English: Mannheim Eagles, formerly Mannheimer ERC) is a professional ice hockey team of the Deutsche Eishockey Liga, the highest-level ice hockey league in Germany. The team is based in Mannheim, a city in the northern part of Baden-Württemberg. Currently, the team plays at SAP Arena, where they moved to at the beginning of the 2005–06 season after having played at Eisstadion am Friedrichspark for nearly seven decades from 1938 through 2005. They have won the German Championship a total of eight times, seven of those coming after 1994 in the Deutsche Eishockey Liga.

== History ==
German ice hockey changed significantly with the formation of the Deutsche Eishockey Liga (DEL) in 1994. Its growing influence also brought growing independence from the German Ice Hockey Federation (DEB) which had regulated ice hockey in Germany for many decades.

=== Pre-DEL era ===
The first incarnation of the Adler Mannheim was the 'Mannheim Ice and Roller Sport Club' (Mannheimer Eis- und Rollsport-Club or MERC), founded on 19 May 1938. On 19 February 1939, they had their introductory match in the brand new Friedrichspark Stadium. The match against the winner of the German Championship was lost 0–11, but the following seasons were more and more successful. However, due to the ongoing Second World War, it was difficult to play a regular season without some limitations. In 1942, after the Mannheim was qualified for the finals, the proclamation of the total war led to the cancellation of the finals, less than 24 hours before their scheduled beginning.

On 5 June 1943, the Eisstadion am Friedrichspark was destroyed by an air attack on Mannheim. After the end of the Second World War in 1945, it took another four years before the hockey club began playing once again. In the 1951/52 season, Mannheim again had a team to play in a regular team, but it was not very successful. The most successful game in this time was a 10–2 victory against a team of American soldiers based in the Mannheim-area.

==== Promotion to first division and first German championship ====
In 1978, the MERC achieved promotion to the first division of Eishockey Bundesliga. In order to be able to set up a team with the limited budget, the MERC and coach Heinz Weisenbach had to get innovative. Weisenbach traveled to North America to search specifically for players with German roots. With Harold Kreis, Manfred "Mannix" Wolf, Roy Roedger and Peter Ascherl, the first "German-Canadians" were transferred into the Eishockey Bundesliga. Additionally, Mannheim acquired the national goalkeeper Erich Weishaupt from the Berliner Schlittschuhclub (Berliner SC). After a sixth place in their debut season, Mannheim strengthened their squad with Ron Andruff and Holger Meitinger and the national players Mannheimer Marcus Kuhl (Cologne) and Peter Obresa (Bad Nauheim). In a complicated tournament mode, from preliminary round, second round and championship round, the MERC would finally win the German championship for the first time. The title win was solidified with a victory in Berlin, and the Mannheim players warmed-up in tailcoats and top hats before their final, inconsequential home game against Cologne EC.

=== DEL era ===
==== Four DEL championships in 5 years ====
In 1994, the Mannheimer ERC was a founding member of the Deutsche Eishockey Liga (DEL). While the organization of the MERC continues to exist to the present day, the professional hockey team changed its name to Adler Mannheim and was transformed into an independent legal entity called "Die Adler Mannheim Eishockey Spielbetriebs GmbH + Co. KG". The old organization MERC still performs in the amateur and junior sectors, including the successful junior team Jungadler Mannheim ('Mannheim Young Eagles') (DNL).

The first two seasons in the DEL ended in playoff quarter finals, but the following season marked the first full success of the DEL era: the Adler Mannheim swept through the playoffs. With the minimum number of nine games, they won the championship in 1997. After also winning the championships in 1998 and 1999, head coach Lance Nethery and several players left the team.

After a disastrous start to the regular 1999–2000 season, the Adler reached the playoffs again, but were beaten in the quarter-finals again. After that season, head coach Chris Valentine was released and was succeeded by Bill Stewart. In 2000–01, the Adler returned to winning ways with the fourth DEL championship in five years.

In their final season at Friedrichspark, Mannheim native Jochen Hecht (Buffalo Sabres), Cristobal Huet (Montreal Canadiens), Yannick Tremblay (Atlanta Thrashers) and Sven Butenschön (New York Islanders) joined the Adler during the 2004–05 NHL lockout. The team made it to the finals, but were defeated by the Eisbären Berlin.

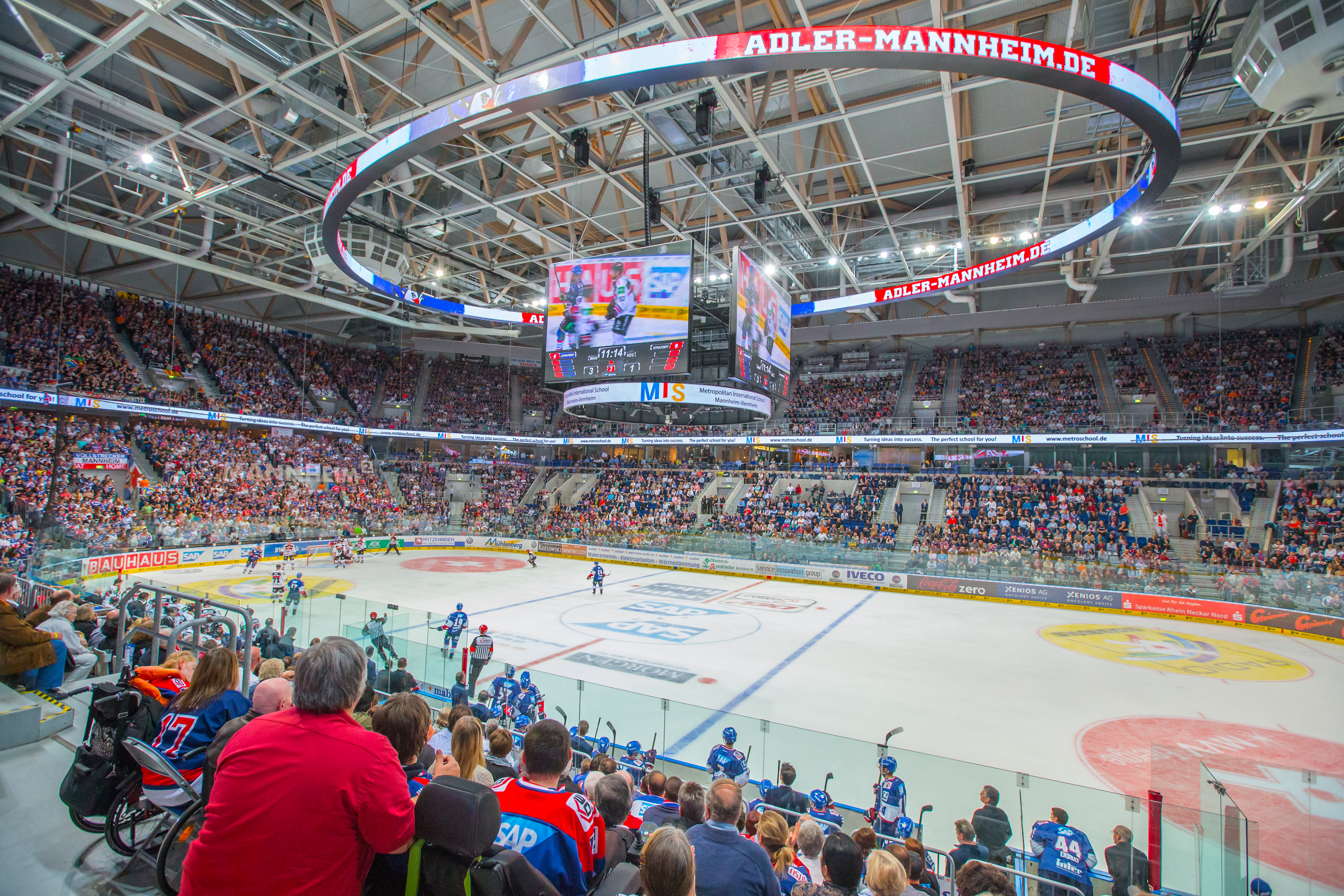
Adler Mannheim game in SAP Arena

==== Move to SAP Arena and 5th DEL championship ====
The following season was disastrous. In their new home, the SAP Arena, the team was placed tenth at the end of the regular season. It was the first time in 26 years that the Adler Mannheim had not qualified for the playoffs.

Making several changes ito the team roster, the team celebrated its resurrection in the following 2006–07 season. After winning the German Cup, they finished in first place in the regular season and then won their fifth DEL Championship.

==== Adler Mannheim and the NHL ====
On 6 July 2010, the Adler Mannheim competed against the San Jose Sharks in the 2011 NHL Premiere Challenge 2010. German national player Manuel Klinge scored for Mannheim in the 5th minute, San Jose equalized with a goal by Jamie McGinn (54th minute). After Devin Setoguchi scored for San Jose, Mannheim's Jame Pollock scored the equalizer at minute 57. In the shoot-out, it was Dan Boyle who scored with the decisive penalty shot for the Sharks.

In July 2011, Mannheim entered a developmental partnership with the Toronto Maple Leafs of the NHL.

The Adler participated in the 2011 NHL Premiere series, losing to the Buffalo Sabres 8–3. The Sabres (who counted among its players Mannheim native Jochen Hecht) were very well received in Mannheim, and later that season, a contingent of Adler fans traveled to Buffalo and Toronto to witness games hosted by the Sabres and Maple Leafs.

During the 2012 NHL lockout, the Adler Mannheim became a popular team for the lockout players again. The former Mannheim players Dennis Seidenberg (Boston Bruins) and Marcel Goc (Florida Panthers) joined the team once more. They were followed by Jason Pominville, captain of the Buffalo Sabres and again Jochen Hecht, who was a free agent since his injury in early 2012. Hecht signed a contract (with an NHL-Out paragraph) until 2014, but after the lockout came to an end, he was offered a new one-year contract by the Buffalo Sabres. After the Sabres' contract expired, Hecht announced his intention to return to Mannheim to finish his professional career.

==== 6th DEL championship and turbulent times ====
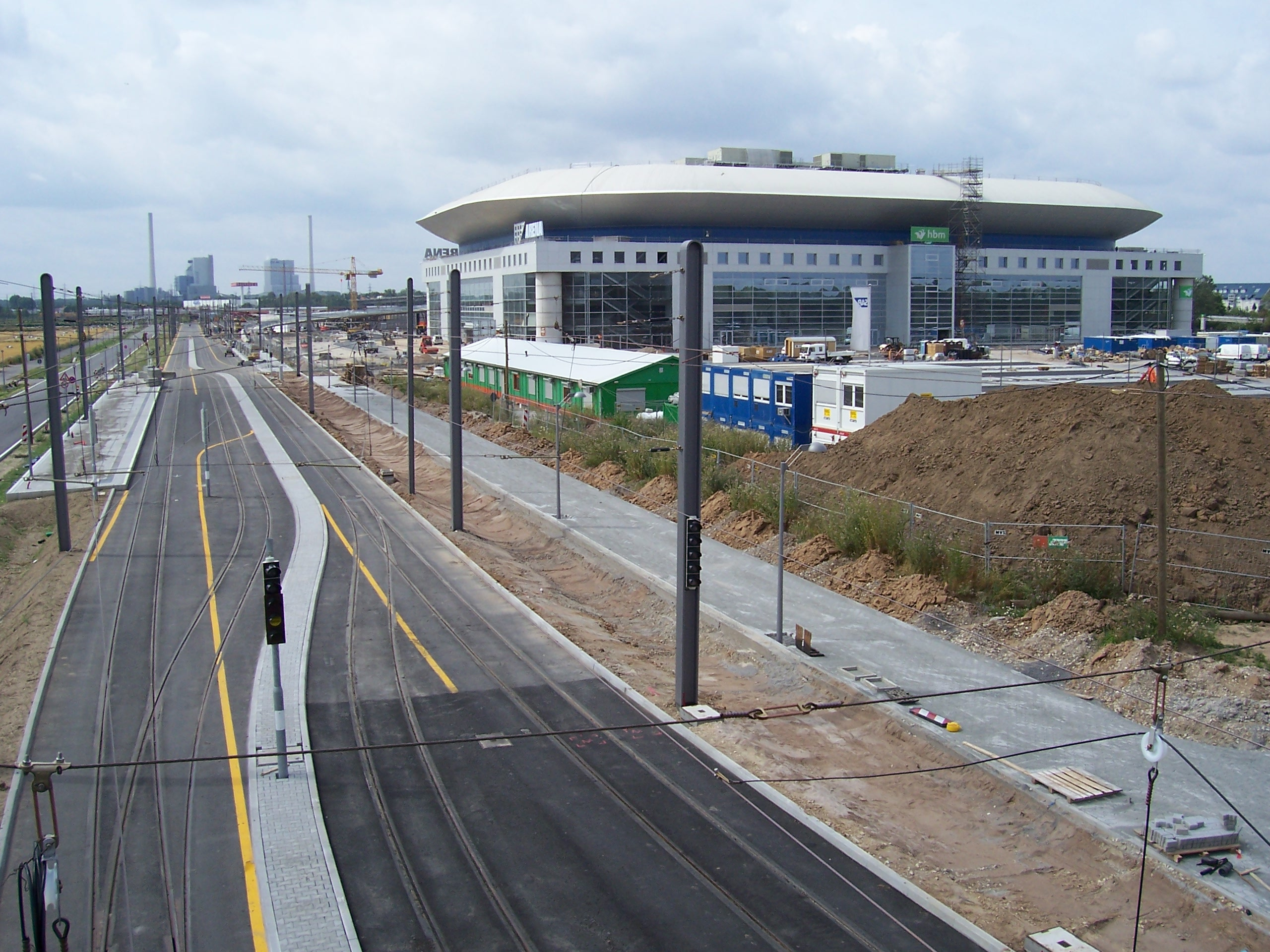
SAP Arena

On 19 June 2014, Mannheim hired Boston Bruins assistant coach Geoff Ward as their new head coach. After winning the regular season with nine points ahead of the second-placed EHC Red Bull München, the Adler won the quarter-final series against the Nürnberg Ice Tigers 4–1. In the semi-finals, the Adler swept Grizzly Adams Wolfsburg with 4–0 victories – even after being down 0–3 goals in three of the games. In the final, Mannheim finally met ERC Ingolstadt. After a devastating 1–6 loss in the third game with Ingolstadt taking the 2–1 lead in the final series, the Adler turned the series and won all subsequent games. With 4–2 victories, the Adler Mannheim were able to win their sixth DEL championship.

After the 2014–15 season, Ward returned to the NHL and was replaced by Greg Ireland. Ireland was sacked in February 2016, and Craig Woodcroft, who had joined the Adler coaching staff in 2014, was promoted to head coach. Woodcroft failed to guide the Adler squad to the playoffs and left after the 2015–16 season. In May 2016, Sean Simpson was named new head coach.

==== Successful transition and 7th DEL championship ====
On 4 December 2017, GM Teal Fowler, head coach Simpson and assistant coach Colin Muller were sacked due to unsatisfactory results. Bill Stewart, who had guided the club to the 2001 DEL title, took over the head coaching job. During the 2017–2018 season, the Adler Mannheim announced Jan-Axel Alavaara as the new GM and Pavel Gross as their new head coach assisted by Mike Pellegrims and Pertti Hasanen.

The Adler finished their regular season 2018–19 at the top of the standings table with a new point average record of 2,23 points per game and won the DEL title 2018–19 defeating EHC Red Bull München 4–1 in the playoff finals. During the summer break, the Adler Mannheim released their long-time team captain Marcus Kink – his successor being NHL veteran and German national player Marcel Goc. Also during the summer break of 2019, Adler Mannheim's rookie defenseman Moritz Seider was drafted in the first round of the NHL Entry Draft, sixth overall, by the Detroit Red Wings. Seider was the first German defenseman to be selected in the first round of an NHL Entry Draft, and the fourth-highest German-born player to be selected until Tim Stützle was selected third overall by the Ottawa Senators in the 2020 NHL Draft. On 14 July 2019, Seider was signed to a three-year, entry-level contract with the Detroit Red Wings. On 27 December 2020, Stützle signed a three-year, entry-level contract with the Ottawa Senators.

After a poor start to the 2023/24 season, general manager Jan-Axel Alavaara and head coach Johan Lundskog were dismissed mid-season and American former NHL head coach Dallas Eakins was announced as new head coach and general manager on 27 November 2023.

== Honours ==
=== Domestic ===
- Deutsche Eishockey Liga
  - (gold) Winners: 1997, 1998, 1999, 2001, 2007, 2015, 2019
  - (silver) Runners-up: 2002, 2005, 2012, 2026
- Deutscher Eishockey-Pokal
  - (gold) Winners: 2003, 2007
  - (silver) Runners-up: 2006
- Eishockey-Bundesliga
  - (gold) Winners: 1980
  - (silver) Runners-up: 1982, 1983, 1985, 1987

=== International ===
- Lehner Cup
  - (silver) Runners-up: 2017, 2018

== Players ==
=== Current roster ===
Updated 11 April 2025.

No.	Nat	Player	Pos	S/G	Age	Acquired	Birthplace
21	(Canada)	Kris Bennett	C	L	30	2023	Brampton, Ontario, Canada
90	(Germany)	Felix Brückmann	G	R	35	2020	Breisach, Germany
4	(Turkey)	Nick Cicek	D	L	26	2024	Winnipeg, Manitoba, Canada
19	(United States)	Luke Esposito	C	L	33	2024	Greenwich, Connecticut, United States
71	(Germany)	Daniel Fischbuch	RW	R	33	2023	Bad Friedrichshall, Germany
5	(Germany)	Tobias Fohrler	D	R	29	2024	Troisdorf, Germany
9	(Germany)	Leon Gawanke	D	R	27	2024	Berlin, Germany
7	(Canada)	John Gilmour	D	L	33	2023	Montreal, Quebec, Canada
1	(Canada)	Alexis Gravel	G	R	26	2025	Berlin, Germany
86	(Germany)	Maximilian Heim	F	L	23	2024	Stuttgart, Germany
33	(Finland)	Markus Hännikäinen	LW	L	33	2023	Helsinki, Finland
23	(Finland)	Jyrki Jokipakka	D	L	35	2023	Tampere, Finland
49	(Germany)	Lukas Kälble	D	L	29	2024	Mannheim, Germany
34	(Germany)	Tom Kühnhackl	W	L	34	2023	Landshut, Germany
37	(Canada)	Zac Leslie	D	L	32	2024	Ottawa, Ontario, Canada
13	(Germany)	Stefan Loibl	RW	R	30	2022	Straubing, Germany
39	(United States)	Tim Lovell	D	L	24	2025	Bad Nauheim, Germany
74	(United States)	Ryan MacInnis	C	L	30	2022	St. Louis, Missouri, United States
59	(Germany)	Paul Mayer	D	L	21	2022	Kaufbeuren, Germany
65	(Germany)	Marc Michaelis (C)	C	L	31	2024	Mannheim, Germany
8	(United States)	Austin Ortega	RW	R	32	2025	Escondido, California, United States
22	(Germany)	Matthias Plachta (A)	LW	L	35	2016	Freiburg, Germany
71	(Germany)	Yannick Proske	C	R	23	2023	Weißwasser, Germany
11	(Czech Republic)	Kristian Reichel	C	R	28	2024	Litvínov, Czech Republic
26	(Germany)	Samuel Soramies	F	L	28	2022	Heidelberg, Germany
14	(Canada)	Jordan Szwarz (A)	RW	R	35	2021	Burlington, Ontario, Canada
16	(Canada)	Eric Uba	RW	R	25	2024	Kitchener, Ontario, Canada

=== Honorable players ===
Points leaders
Player	Seasons	Games	Goals	Assists	Points
Christoph Ullmann	2003–2008, 2011–2018	561	135	145	280
Jochen Hecht	1994–1998, 2004–2005, 2012–2016	356	105	161	266
Pavel Gross	1994–1999	220	81	180	261
Dave Tomlinson	1996–2002	291	101	159	260
Ronny Arendt	2005–2017	609	103	154	257

Goals
Player	Seasons	Games	Goals
Christoph Ullmann	2003–2008, 2011–2018	561	135
René Corbet	2001–2009	314	130
Jochen Hecht	1994–1998, 2004–2005, 2012–2016	356	105
Ronny Arendt	2005–2017	609	103
Dave Tomlinson	1996–2002	291	101

Assists
Player	Seasons	Games	Assists
Pavel Gross	1994–1999	220	180
Jochen Hecht	1994–1998, 2004–2005, 2012–2016	356	161
Dave Tomlinson	1996–2002	291	159
Marcus Kink	2004–2019	700	159
Ronny Arendt	2005–2017	609	154

Most Points in a Single Season
Player	Season	Games	Goals	Assists	Points
Jan Alston	1999–00	50	31	43	74
Pavel Gross	1995–96	49	29	43	72
Robert Cimetta	1995–96	50	22	41	63
Pavel Gross	1994–95	42	21	41	62
Robert Cimetta	1994–95	39	29	31	60

Most Penalty Minutes
Player	Seasons	Games	PIM
Marcus Kink	2004–2019	700	876
Mike Stevens	1998–2002	204	772
Tomas Martinec	2003–2012	285	696
René Corbet	2001–2009	314	622
Jochen Hecht	1994–1998, 2004–2005, 2012–2016	356	589

Play-off scoring leaders
Player	Seasons	Games	Goals	Assists	Points
Jochen Hecht	1994–1998, 2004–2005, 2012–2016	75	25	31	56
Stéphane Richer	1995–2002	64	10	46	56
Christoph Ullmann	2003–2008, 2011–2018	86	27	28	55
Devin Edgerton	2000–2006	50	24	29	53
Dave Tomlinson	1996–2002	60	20	29	49

=== Retired numbers ===
Adler Mannheim retired numbers
No.	Player	Position	Career	No. retirement
2	Werner Lorenz	D	1956–1964	23 November 2012
3	Harold Kreis	D	1978–1997	7 February 1998
10	Kurt Sepp	F	1956–1967	23 November 2012
12	Bruno Guttowski	D	1955–1964	23 November 2012
15	Marcus Kuhl	F	1979–1982	
20	René Corbet	L	2001–2009	4 October 2011
25	Stéphane Richer	D	1995–2002	2. September 2005
55	Jochen Hecht	F	1994–1998, 2004–2005, 2012–2013, 2013–2016	23 February 2018
57	Ronny Arendt	F	2005–2017	23 February 2018
80	Robert Müller^{1}	G	2000–2002, 2006–2007	22 May 2009

- ^{1}After his death, the Adler Mannheim, the Kölner Haie and the EHC Klostersee retired his #80. At the beginning of the season 2008–09, his number was retired league-wide by the DEL.

=== Championship teams ===
- 1979/80: Erich Weishaupt, Joachim Casper, Harold Kreis, Werner Jahn, Brent Meeke, Bogoslaw Malinowski, Norbert Mundo, Marcus Kuhl, Ron Andruff, Holger Meitinger, Peter Obresa, Manfred Wolf, Dany Djakalovic, Peter Ascherl, Elias Vorlicek, Klaus Mangold, Jürgen Adams, Jörg Etz and Roy Roedger; Heinz Weisenbach (coach).
- 1996/97: Joachim Appel, Mike Rosati, Harold Kreis, Paul Stanton, Christian Lukes, Robert Nardella, Alexander Erdmann, Stéphane Richer, Martin Ulrich, Mike Pellegrims; Steve Thornton, Mario Gehrig, Pavel Gross, Dave Tomlinson, Daniel Körber, Rob Cimetta, François Guay, Jochen Hecht, Florian Keller, Till Feser, Philippe Bozon, Tommie Hartogs, Alexander Serikow, Christian Pouget, Dieter Kalt and Paul Beraldo; Lance Nethery (coach).
- 1997/98: Klaus Merk, Mike Rosati, Christian Künast, Darren Rumble, Gordon Hynes, Paul Stanton, Christian Lukes, Mike Posma, Christopher Felix, Stéphane Richer, Martin Ulrich, Mike Pellegrims, Alexander Erdmann, Mario Gehrig, Pavel Gross, Dave Tomlinson, Philippe Bozon, Rob Cimetta, François Guay, Jochen Hecht, Ole Eskild Dahlstrøm, Mike Hudson, Alexander Serikow, Christian Pouget, Denis Chassé, Ron Pasco, Daniel Marois, Philipp Schumacher and Dieter Kalt; Lance Nethery (coach).
- 1998/99: Sven Rampf, Pavel Cagas, Danny Lorenz, Helmut de Raaf, Gordon Hynes, Paul Stanton, Reid Simonton, Christian Lukes, Denis Perez, Stéphane Richer, Mike Pellegrims, Michael de Angelis, Brian Tutt, Mark Etz, Pavel Gross, Dave Tomlinson, Philippe Bozon, Kevin Miehm, Jason Young, Ron Pasco, Mike Hudson, Alexander Serikow, Christian Pouget, Mike Stevens, Philip Schumacher, Jan Alston and Jackson Penney; Lance Nethery (coach).
- 2000/01: Mike Rosati, Robert Müller, Helmut de Raaf, Bradley Bergen, Andy Roach, Christian Lukes, Francois Groleau, Stéphane Richer, Yves Racine, Dennis Seidenberg, Michael Bakos; Gordon Hynes, Mark Etz, Dave Tomlinson, Steve Junker, Wayne Hynes, Devin Edgerton, Ron Pasco, Marc Pederson, Georg Hessel, Todd Hlushko, Mike Stevens, Jan Alston, Jean-Francois Jomphe, Daniel Hilpert, Christopher Straube and Jackson Penney; Bill Stewart (coach).
- 2006/07 Jean-Marc Pelletier, Ilpo Kauhanen, Danny aus den Birken, Robert Müller, Blake Sloan, Sven Butenschön, Pascal Trepanier, François Bouchard, Martin Ancicka, Felix Petermann, Stephan Retzer, Nathan Robinson, Eduard Lewandowski, Jason Jaspers, Tomas Martinec, Christoph Ullmann, René Corbet, Colin Forbes, Rico Fata, Jeff Shantz, François Méthot, Ronny Arendt, Marcus Kink and Rick Girard; Greg Poss / Teal Fowler (coaches)
- 2014/15 Dennis Endras, Youri Ziffzer, Sinan Akdağ, Dominik Bittner, Christopher Fischer, Kurtis Foster, Nikolai Goc, Bobby Raymond, Denis Reul, Danny Richmond, Steve Wagner, Ronny Arendt, Martin Buchwieser, Jochen Hecht, Mirko Höfflin, Kai Hospelt, Andrew Joudrey, Marcus Kink (C), Frank Mauer, Glen Metropolit, Matthias Plachta, Jon Rheault, Jamie Tardif, Christoph Ullmann and Brandon Yip – Geoff Ward, Jay Leach and Craig Woodcroft (coaches)
- 2018/19 Dennis Endras, Chet Pickard, Sinan Akdağ, Mark Katic, Cody Lampl, Joonas Lehtivuori, Thomas Larkin, Brendan Mikkelson, Janik Möser, Denis Reul, Moritz Seider, Luke Adam, Tim Bernhardt, Andrew Desjardins, Markus Eisenschmid, Garret Festerling, Marcel Goc, Tommi Huhtala, Phil Hungerecker, Marcus Kink (C), Chad Kolarik, Nicolas Krämmer, Alex Lambacher, Matthias Plachta, Brent Raedeke, Ben Smith and David Wolf – Pavel Gross, Mike Pellegrims and Pertti Hasanen (coaches)

== Head coaches ==
The following list shows all head coaches of Adler Mannheim during the DEL era.

- Lance Nethery, 1994–99
- Chris Valentine, 1999–00
- Bill Stewart, 2000–04
- Helmut de Raaf, 2004
- Stéphane Richer, 2004–05
- Greg Poss, 2005–07
- Dave King, 2007–09
- Teal Fowler (Interim), 2009
- Doug Mason, 2009–10
- Teal Fowler, 2010
- Harold Kreis, 2010–13
- Hans Zach, 2014
- Geoff Ward, 2014–15
- Greg Ireland, 2015–16
- Craig Woodcroft, 2016
- Sean Simpson, 2016–17
- Bill Stewart, 2017–18
- Pavel Gross, 2018–22
- Bill Stewart, 2022–23
- Johan Lundskog, 2023
- Dallas Eakins, 2023–present

== DEL Season records ==
Adler Mannheim DEL season records
Season	Games	Won	Tie	Lost	OTW	OTL	Points	Goals for	Goals against	Rank	Playoffs
1994–95	44	29	-	9	6	0	64	164	108	3	Quarter-final loss
1995–96	50	29	-	12	7	2	67	195	163	7	Quarter-final loss
1996–97	50	35	-	10	5	1	76	212	123	1	Champion
1997–98	48	26	-	16	3	3	58	170	145	4	Champion
1998–99	52	24	-	16	5	7	89	208	182	3	Champion
1999-00	56	27	-	19	6	4	97	199	181	5	Quarter-final loss
2000–01	60	31	-	16	9	4	115	205	144	1	Champion
2001–02	60	34	-	14	6	6	120	186	135	2	Final loss
2002–03	52	25	-	16	8	3	94	152	129	4	Semi-final loss
2003–04	52	26	-	16	4	6	92	151	124	6	Quarter-final loss
2004–05	52	23	-	21	3	5	80	151	150	6	Final loss
2005–06	52	19	-	26	4	3	68	148	155	10	Did not make playoffs
2006–07	52	29	-	9	6	8	107	184	147	1	Champion
2007–08	56	24	-	20	8	4	92	180	174	6	Quarter-final loss
2008–09	52	22	-	18	7	5	85	144	131	4	Semi-final loss
2009–10	56	23	-	22	4	7	84	177	177	9	Playoffs Qualifier loss
2010–11	52	20	-	20	7	5	79	131	137	7	Quarter-final loss
2011–12	52	23	-	15	7	7	90	171	148	4	Final loss
2012–13	52	30	-	16	3	3	99	164	125	1	Quarter-final loss
2013–14	52	26	-	18	4	4	90	148	123	4	Quarter-final loss
2014–15	52	33	-	14	3	2	107	173	123	1	Champion
2015–16	52	20	-	24	5	3	73	138	146	4	Playoffs Qualifier loss
2016–17	52	30	-	12	6	4	106	183	135	2	Quarter-final loss
2017–18	52	21	-	22	6	3	78	151	149	5	Semi-final loss
2018–19	52	35	-	8	2	7	116	194	117	1	Champion
2019–20	52	28	-	12	6	6	180	132	102	2	Cancelled due to the COVID-19 pandemic.
2020–21	38	23	-	5	8	2	87	116	71	1	Semi-final loss
2021–22	54	24	-	19	10	1	93	165	129	5	Semi-final loss
2022–23	56	34	-	15	6	1	99	162	136	3	Semi-final loss
2023–24	52	21	-	20	2	3	80	147	149	7	Quarter-final loss
2024–25	52	26	-	17	2	3	91	160	138	4	Semi-final loss
2025–26	52	29	-	13	6	4	103	182	122	2	Final loss

== Affiliated teams ==
=== Jungadler Mannheim ===
The youth performance center of the Adler Mannheim is called "Jungadler Mannheim" (youth eagles). Their under 20 junior team is 16-times national youth champion and record holder. Famous former Jungadler players are e.g. Dominik Kahun (Chicago Blackhawks), Leon Draisaitl (Edmonton Oilers), Moritz Seider (Detroit Red Wings), and Tim Stützle (Ottawa Senators).

=== ERC Mannheimer WildCats ===
The female contingent of the Mannheimer ERC carries the name "Wild Cats." The most successful period in the WildCats' career was between 1988 and 1994 during which they won three German championships and vice-championships. The Wildcats did not play during the 2005–06 season after four players terminated their contracts. Therefore, they were forced to temporarily withdraw from the league.
