= Jan-Axel Alavaara =

Swedish ice hockey player

- Born: 14 March 1975 (age 50); Kiruna, Sweden
- Height: 5 ft 11 in (180 cm)
- Weight: 196 lb (89 kg; 14 st 0 lb)
- Position: Defence
- Shot: Left
- Played for: Modo; Frölunda HC; Kloten Flyers (NLA); EHC Wolfsburg (DEL)
- National team: Sweden
- Playing career: 1995–2012

Jan-Axel Alavaara (born 14 March 1975) is a Swedish former professional ice hockey defenceman. After the 2011/2012 season Alavaara retired and became junior coach at MoDo Hockey Club.

== Career statistics ==
=== Regular season and playoffs ===
			Regular season					Playoffs
Season	Team	League	GP	G	A	Pts	PIM	GP	G	A	Pts	PIM
1995–96	Modo Hockey	SEL	31	2	0	2	14	7	0	0	0	2
1996–97	Modo Hockey	SEL	45	3	4	7	40	—	—	—	—	—
1997–98	Modo Hockey	SEL	46	4	8	12	54	8	1	2	3	40
1998–99	Modo Hockey	SEL	29	3	3	6	44	13	4	1	5	20
1999–00	Modo Hockey	SEL	43	5	9	14	48	13	1	1	2	12
2000–01	Modo Hockey	SEL	39	3	8	11	22	7	1	0	1	2
2001–02	Frölunda HC	SEL	50	5	11	16	28	10	1	3	4	10
2002–03	Frölunda HC	SEL	49	4	6	10	71	15	0	2	2	16
2003–04	Frölunda HC	SEL	50	2	10	12	98	10	0	0	0	2
2004–05	Frölunda HC	SEL	49	4	12	16	48	14	1	1	2	18
2005–06	Frölunda HC	SEL	50	4	6	10	76	17	1	3	4	20
2006–07	Frölunda HC	SEL	54	5	13	18	80	—	—	—	—	—
2007–08	Kloten Flyers	NLA	46	3	11	14	52	5	0	1	1	2
2008–09	Grizzly Adams Wolfsburg	DEL	52	13	31	44	36	10	2	4	6	10
2009–10	Grizzly Adams Wolfsburg	DEL	50	6	22	28	48	7	3	0	3	4
2010–11	Grizzly Adams Wolfsburg	DEL	50	10	20	30	16	9	1	5	6	6
SEL totals			535	44	90	134	623	114	10	13	23	142
