= Greg Ireland =

Canadian ice hockey coach (born 1965)

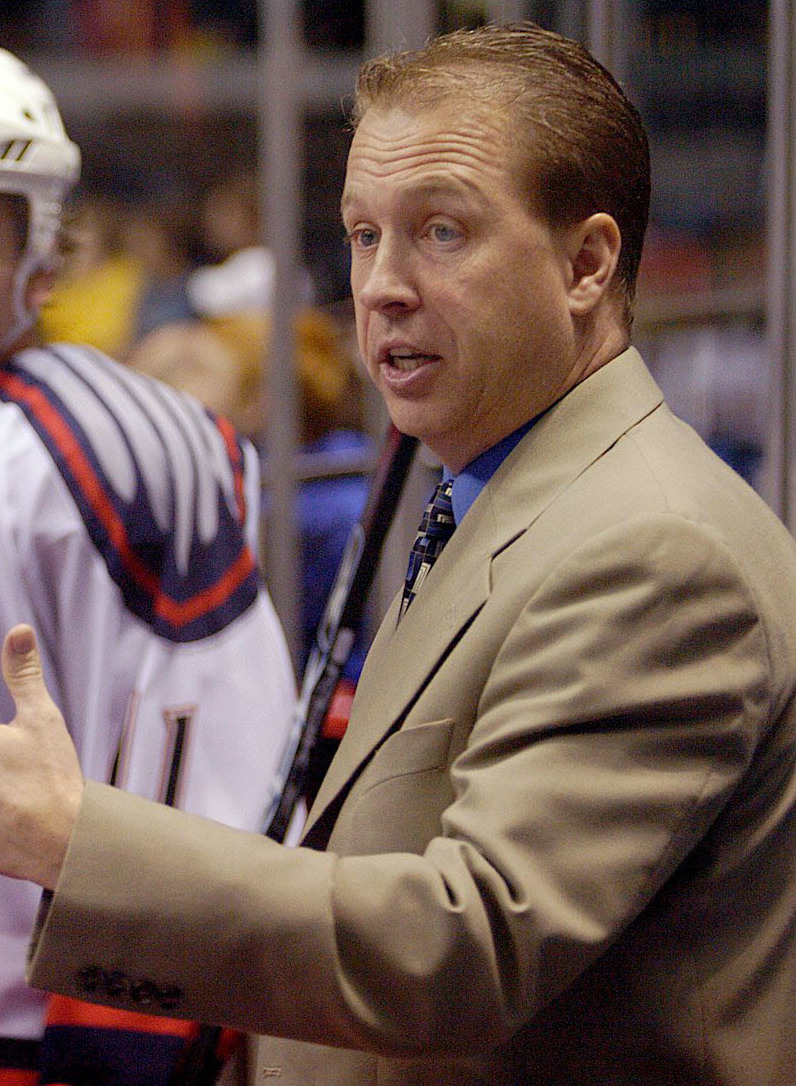
- Born: Gregory Ireland; October 5, 1965 (age 60); Orangeville, Ontario, Canada
- Occupation: professional ice hockey coach

Greg Ireland (born October 5, 1965) is a Canadian ice hockey coach. Ireland has coached minor and junior amateur teams and professional teams in North America and Europe. He is currently head coach of HC Ajoie, which is a member of the National League.

== Career ==
Born in Orangeville, Ontario, Ireland is a graduate of York University. Ireland began his career as ice hockey coach in 1991 as head coach of the Milton Merchants. In 1992 he was hired by the Oakville Blades to be their head coach. After two years with the team and after receiving Ontario Hockey Association's Jr. A Division West Coach of the Year honors in 1994, he took over the Caledon Canadians and guided the team to three Metro Junior A Hockey League runner-up finishes in four years. Under his guidance, the Canadians amassed a 42-3-5 record in 1994–95, making them the number one team in Canadian junior hockey at the time.

Ireland then spent five years (1998–2003) at the helm of the Dayton Bombers, serving as head coach and general manager of hockey operations. He coached the team to an EHCL record of 175-134-47 and led the Bombers to an appearance in the 2002 Kelly Cup finals.

In the second half of the 2002–03 season, he had a short stint as assistant coach of the Hamilton Bulldogs of the AHL.

Ireland joined the coaching staff of AHL's Grand Rapids Griffins, affiliate to the Detroit Red Wings, in 2003, serving two years as assistant, before being promoted to head coach in February 2005. The Griffins made the Calder Cup playoff semifinals in Ireland's first full season as head coach (2005–06). Ireland stayed on the job until 2007 and then was appointed as head coach of the San Antonio Rampage in August 2007. In November 2009, he was sacked by the AHL affiliate of the Phoenix Coyotes after a run of ten games without a win.

Ireland was hired by Swiss side HC Lugano in February 2011 only a couple of days before the start of the relegation round. His task was to keep the club in the top flight National League A which he did.

He signed with the Owen Sound Attack of the Ontario Hockey League in August 2011 and stepped down from his head coaching position in July 2015 to accept an offer from Germany: He signed with Adler Mannheim, defending champion of the German elite league Deutsche Eishockey Liga, for the 2015–16 campaign, but was sacked in February 2016 after a five-game losing streak. The Adler Mannheim CEO said in a statement, the team had displayed a lack of consistency throughout the season.

On January 16, 2017, Ireland was named head coach of HC Lugano of the National League A (NLA). He led HCL to the NLA semifinals and was handed a two-year contract extension in April 2017. In March 2019, he parted ways with the club after losing 0-4 in the playoff quarterfinals against Zug.

On January 2, 2020, he was signed as new head coach of HC Bozen–Bolzano of the ICE Hockey League and on March 22, 2020 also accepted the job as head coach of the Italian men's national team.

On July 16, 2022, Ireland moved to the KHL after agreeing to become the head coach of Chinese club, Kunlun Red Star.
