= Sean Simpson =

Canadian ice hockey coach

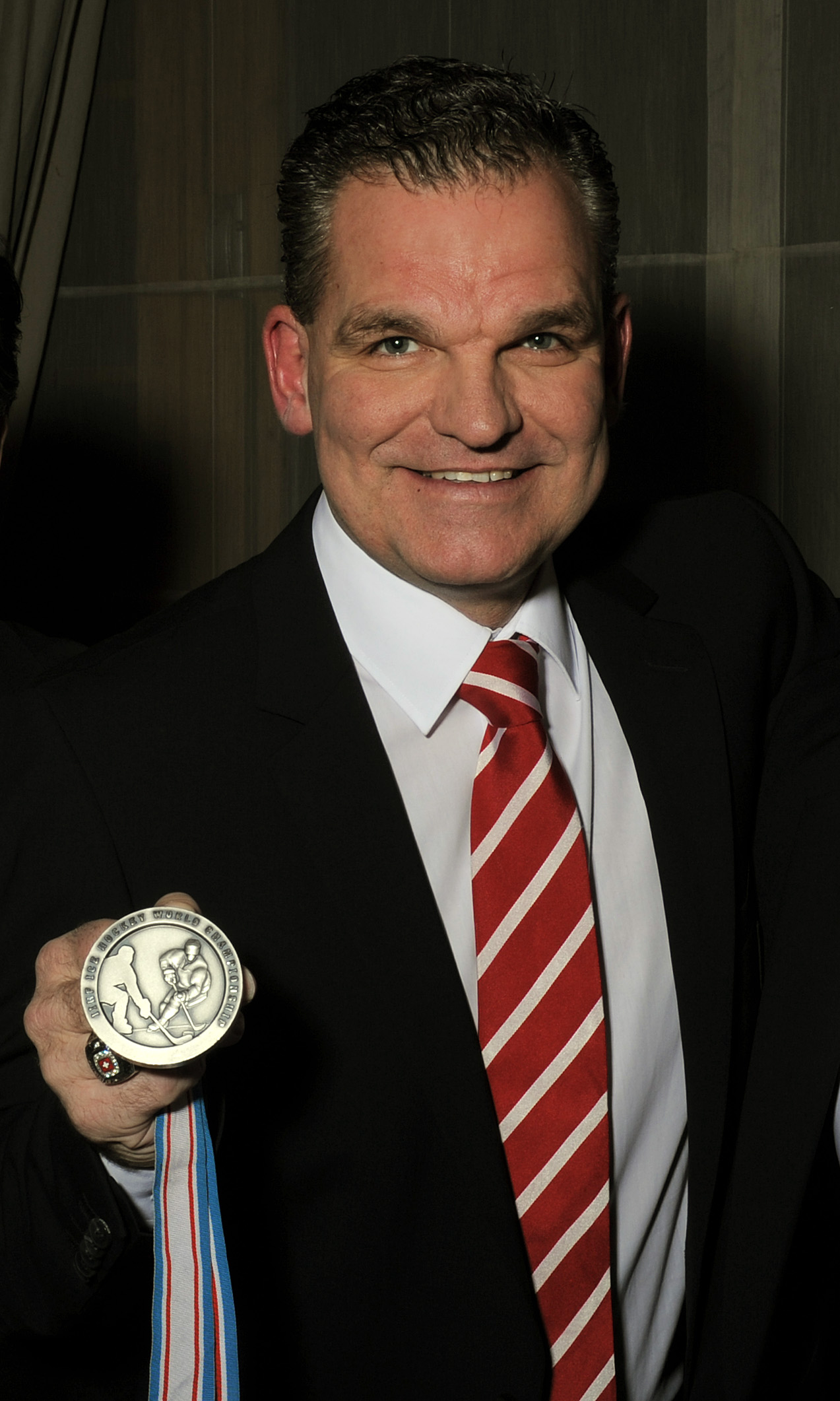
- Born: May 4, 1960 (age 66) Essex, England, United Kingdom
- Height: 6 ft 0 in (183 cm)
- Weight: 175 lb (79 kg; 12 st 7 lb)
- Position: Centre
- Shot: Left
- Played for: New Brunswick Hawks; Springfield Indians; Tilburg Trappers; Rotterdam Panda's; EHC Olten
- NHL draft: 141st overall, 1980; Chicago Black Hawks
- Playing career: 1981–1992

Sean Simpson (born May 4, 1960) is a Canadian ice hockey coach and former professional ice hockey player. He last served as head coach of the Hungarian National Team.

As a player, Simpson played two AHL seasons before embarking upon a career playing in Europe.

== Playing career ==
Simpson played major junior briefly for the Kingston Canadians and then for four seasons with the Ottawa 67's. During his time with Ottawa 67's (1977-1981), Sean Simpson had 141 goals and 238 assists in 226 games played. Simpson is 6th on the All-Time Regular Player stats for the Ottawa 67's. In 1979-1980, Simpson also represented Canada in the World Junior Championships U-20 tournament Drafted by the Chicago Blackhawks in the 7th round in the 1980 NHL entry draft, he played a season with the New Brunswick Hawks. He then played the following season for the Springfield Indians, also of the AHL.

Simpson joined Tilburg Trappers in 1983, for whom he played four seasons. During the 1986-87 season, Simpson represented Canada again at the International level. In 1988, he joined Rotterdam Panda's (sic). He was the Eredivisie's top scorer in both 1983–84 and 1988–89.

In 1989, he joined the Nationalliga A club EHC Olten. He played the following season in Serie A with HC Fiemme Cavalese.

== Coaching career ==
Simpson began his coaching career in 1992 as an assistant coach to Björn Kindling and later Jim Koleff at EV Zug in the Swiss elite league National League A. Prior to the 1997-98 season, Simpson was promoted to the head coaching position and guided Zug to the NLA championship in his first year at the helm. Zug had also finished the regular season on top of the NLA table.

Simpson served another year as Zug head coach and then joined the München Barons of the German top-flight Deutsche Eishockey Liga (DEL) for the 1999-2000 season and won the DEL title his first year. The following season, he coached the Barons to another finals appearance, where they lost 3 games to 1 to Mannheim. In 2001-02, Simpson led the Barons to the semifinals, where they lost to Kölner Haie. The franchise was relocated to Hamburg in 2002 and renamed the Hamburg Freezers. Simpson coached the Hamburg team in its inaugural season (2002–03) and led the Freezers to a playoff berth. He left Hamburg after the season to return to EV Zug.

In 2003-04, he guided EVZ to the NLA playoffs, where they fell short in the quarterfinals (4-1 against Bern), despite having former NHL star Claude Lemieux on the team, who had signed with Zug in February 2004 for the remainder of the season. In 2004-05, Simpson guided Zug to the NLA semifinals but did not manage to get past the ZSC Lions.

The following season, Simpson's team was held off by Rapperswil-Jona in the quarterfinals and reached the semis one year later. In his final year at the Zug helm (2007–08), Simpson coached EVZ to another playoff appearance but did not get past the quarterfinals.

Simpson inked a deal with reigning Swiss champs ZSC Lions in 2008. In his two years at ZSC, Simpson guided the Lions to the Champions Hockey League title and the Victoria Cup title in 2009 beating the Chicago Blackhawks of National Hockey League (NHL). In the NLA, the Lions dropped out in the playoff quarterfinals both years.

During his tenures at EV Zug and ZSC, Simpson was named to the coaching staff of Team Canada for the Spengler-Cup five times (three times as assistant coach, twice as head coach) and guided the team to the title in 2007.

Simpson was named head coach of the Swiss national team prior to the 2010 World Championships and remained in that job until 2014. At the 2010 World Championships, Simpson's team defeated Canada in the preliminary round and made it to the quarterfinals, before falling short to host Germany. In 2011 and 2012, the Swiss team failed to qualify for the quarterfinals at the World Championships. In 2013, Simpson led the Swiss national team to its greatest ever success, a silver medal at the World Championships in Sweden. At the 2014 Olympic Games, Simpson's squad missed the quarterfinals and finished in ninth place.

In April 2014, he became the head coach of KHL team Lokomotiv Yaroslavl, but was sacked after nine games. In December 2014 he became the head coach of the Kloten Flyers in the Swiss National League A. In May 2016, after the club had been sold to Hans-Ueli Lehmann and after budget cuts had been announced, Simpson's contract with Kloten was terminated by mutual consent.

He was named head coach of Adler Mannheim of the Deutsche Eishockey Liga (DEL) on May 11, 2016. In the 2016-17 season, he led the team to a second-place finish in the regular season, before falling short to Eisbären Berlin in the playoff quarterfinals. On December 4, 2017, Simpson was relieved of his duties as Mannheim head coach due to the team's poor results. The Adler team was in seventh place, when Simpson was sacked.

In October 2019, Sean Simpson returned to the NLA and became a coaching advisor to the coaching staff for HC Fribourg-Gottéron during the 2019-2020 season.

Sean Simpson was named the Head Coach of the Hungary men's national ice hockey team in September 2020 for the next two seasons.
