= 1999–2000 DEL season =

1999–2000 Deutsche Eishockey Liga season
- League: Deutsche Eishockey Liga
- Sport: Ice hockey
- Teams: 15

1999–2000
- Season champions: Munich Barons

DEL seasons
- ← 1998–99 2000–01 →

The 1999–2000 Deutsche Eishockey Liga season was the 6th season of the Deutsche Eishockey Liga (German Ice Hockey League). An agreement was reached between DEL and the 1. Liga. With DEL being the top-level league, it would be known as the DEL - Die 1. Bundesliga, and the 1. Liga as the 2. Bundesliga. A new logo displaying the full name was introduced at the same time.

The regular season was played from September 10, 1999, until March 12, 2000; the playoffs started soon thereafter on March 17. The Munich Barons, who bought their license from the EV Landshut, became DEL champions.

A number of major changes were introduced this season. One change was the reintroduction of relegation. However, while the Essen Mosquitoes were to be relegated, they were granted a stay as the Starbulls Rosenheim had to retread due to finance issues.

The second change was that there would be no overtime played; in case a game ends in a tie after the regular periods, shootouts commenced.

== Regular season ==
All teams played each other 4 times, for a total of 56 rounds. The first 8 placed teams qualified for the playoffs.

	Team	GP	W	SOW	SOL	L	GF:GA	Points
1.	Kölner Haie	56	33	2	11	10	217:144	114
2.	Munich Barons	56	31	5	6	14	208:155	109
3.	Krefeld Pinguine	56	28	6	5	17	213:171	101
4.	Kassel Huskies	56	28	2	9	17	168:137	97
5.	Adler Mannheim	56	27	6	4	19	199:181	97
6.	Berlin Capitals	56	24	9	7	16	183:172	97
7.	Frankfurt Lions	56	24	8	4	20	190:175	92
8.	Augsburger Panther	56	25	5	2	24	175:166	87
9.	Hannover Scorpions	56	21	6	3	26	187:198	78
10.	Nürnberg Ice Tigers	56	23	2	2	29	169:179	75
11.	Schwenninger ERC Wild Wings	56	18	5	9	24	160:185	73
12.	Starbulls Rosenheim	56	19	5	4	28	168:201	71
13.	Eisbären Berlin	56	21	2	3	30	181:193	70
14.	Revierlöwen Oberhausen	56	10	9	3	34	141:201	51
15.	Essen Mosquitoes	56	13	3	3	37	128:229	48

GP = Games played, W = Win, SOW = Shootout Win, SOL = Shootout Loss, L = Loss
= Qualified for playoffs = Continue play to determine relegation

=== Player awards ===
Category	Name	Team	Record
Most points	(Canada) Jan Alston	Adler Mannheim	74 points
Most goals	(Russia) Sergej Wostrikow	Augsburger Panther	36 goals
Most assists	(Sweden) Peter Larsson	Augsburger Panther	51 assists
Best goalie	(Canada) Andrew Verner	Kölner Haie	0.922 save %
Best defender	(Canada) Shane Peacock	München Barons	52 points

== Relegation round ==
In the relegation round, all teams played each other once and the points were added to the regular season standings.

	Team	GP	W	SOW	SOL	L	GF:GA	Points
1.	Hannover Scorpions	68	26	9	4	29	257:245	100
2.	Nürnberg Ice Tigers	68	29	3	3	33	169:179	96
3.	Schwenninger ERC Wild Wings	68	24	5	9	30	199:232	91
4.	Starbulls Rosenheim	68	23	5	8	31	213:244	90
5.	Eisbären Berlin	68	25	2	4	37	230:256	83
6.	Revierlöwen Oberhausen	68	16	11	4	37	174:234	74
7.	Essen Mosquitoes	68	15	5	3	45	167:282	58

GP = Games played, W = Win, SOW = Shootout Win, SOL = Shootout Loss, L = Loss
= Qualified for next season = Relegation

The Essen Mosquitoes should have been relegated. However, the Starbulls Rosenheim transferred their DEL license to the Iserlohner EC and pulled themselves voluntarily out of the league due to financial trouble. The matter went to court and the Moskitos won an order to stay in the league.

== Playoff ==
The playoffs were played in a best-of-five mode.

Quarterfinals
1	Kölner Haie	3
8	Augsburger Panther	0
3	Krefeld Pinguine	1
6	Berlin Capitals	3
2	München Barons	3
7	Frankfurt Lions	2
4	Kassel Huskies	3
5	Adler Mannheim	2

Semifinals
1	Kölner Haie	3
6	Berlin Capitals	0
2	München Barons	3
4	Kassel Huskies	0

Finals
1	Kölner Haie	1
2	München Barons	3

=== Quarterfinals ===
Quarterfinals started March 17, 2000

			Game	1	2	3	4	5
Kölner Haie	–	Augsburger Panther	3:0	4:2	4:2	5:3	–	–
München Barons	–	Frankfurt Lions	3:2	2:3	5:0	3:0	3:5	4:1
Krefeld Pinguine	–	Berlin Capitals	1:3	2:1	4:5	3:4	3:4	–
Kassel Huskies	–	Adler Mannheim	3:2	3:1	0:4	0:2	7:1	7:2

OT = Overtime; SO = Shootout

=== Semifinals ===
Semifinals started April 1 with the regular season best placed team left played against the worst, and the second best vs. third best.

			Game	1	2	3	4	5
Kölner Haie	–	Berlin Capitals	3:0	2:1	5:1	4:1	–	–
München Barons	–	Kassel Huskies	3:0	4:0	2:1	4:2	–	–

OT = Overtime; SO = Shootout

=== Finals ===
Finals started April 22, with the Kölner Haie playing home first, due to better regular season placement.

			Game	1	2	3	4	5
Kölner Haie	–	Munich Barons	1:3	5:3	2:3	0:3	3:4	–

OT = Overtime; SO = Shootout

With the last game, the Munich Barons became the DEL Champion, winning a German title for the first time in their history.
