= 1998–99 DEL season =

1998–99 Deutsche Eishockey Liga season
- League: Deutsche Eishockey Liga
- Sport: Ice hockey
- Teams: 14

1998–99
- Season champions: Adler Mannheim

DEL seasons
- ← 1997–98 1999–2000 →

The 1998–99 Deutsche Eishockey Liga season was the 5th season of the Deutsche Eishockey Liga (German Ice Hockey League).

Adler Mannheim continued their dominance in German ice-hockey and became the DEL Champion for the third time in row, winning a German title for the fourth time in their history. The league had only 14 teams, as the Kaufbeurer Adler and Düsseldorfer EG were forced out due to financial reasons.

== Regular season ==
The first 8 placed teams qualified for the playoffs.

	Team	GP	W	OTW	OTL	L	GF:GA	Points
1.	Nürnberg Ice Tigers	52	30	7	2	15	199:142	106
2.	Eisbären Berlin	52	26	4	5	17	210:163	91
3.	Adler Mannheim	52	24	5	7	16	208:182	89
4.	Frankfurt Lions	52	25	5	4	18	184:168	89
5.	Kölner Haie	52	21	9	7	15	182:159	88
6.	EV Landshut	52	21	8	9	14	163:140	88
7.	Krefeld Pinguine	52	23	7	4	18	183:159	87
8.	Augsburger Panther	52	22	8	3	19	175:166	85
9.	Kassel Huskies	52	24	4	4	20	165:145	84
10.	Schwenninger ERC Wild Wings	52	19	4	7	22	195:217	72
11.	Hannover Scorpions	52	18	3	6	25	175:195	66
12.	Starbulls Rosenheim	52	15	6	5	26	169:213	62
13.	Berlin Capitals	52	12	4	8	28	146:205	52
14.	Revierlöwen Oberhausen	52	10	0	3	39	148:254	33

GP = Games played, W = Win, OTW = Overtime win, OTL = Overtime loss, L = Loss
= Qualified for playoffs = Season ended

== Player Awards ==
Category	Name	Team	Record
Most points	Martin Jiranek	Nürnberg Ice Tigers	69 Points
Most goals	Jan Alston	Adler Mannheim	33 Goals
Most assists	John Chabot	Frankfurt Lions	52 Assists
Best goalie	Petr Bříza	EV Landshut	2.51 Goals-Against-Average
Best defender	Chris Snell	Frankfurt Lions	51 Points

== Playoff ==
The playoffs were played in a best-of-five mode.

Quarterfinals
1	Nürnberg Ice Tigers	3
8	Augsburger Panther	2
4	Frankfurt Lions	3
5	Kölner Haie	2
2	Eisbären Berlin	3
7	Krefeld Pinguine	1
3	Adler Mannheim	3
6	EV Landshut	0

Semifinals
1	Nürnberg Ice Tigers	3
4	Frankfurt Lions	0
2	Eisbären Berlin	1
3	Adler Mannheim	3

Finals
1	Nürnberg Ice Tigers	2
3	Adler Mannheim	3

=== Quarterfinals ===
The quarterfinals were played starting March 12, 1999.

			Game	1	2	3	4	5
Nürnberg Ice Tigers	–	Augsburger Panther	3:2	5:4	5:6 OT	5:1	1:2 OT	2:1
Eisbären Berlin	–	Krefeld Pinguine	3:1	3:2	2:4	5:4 OT	6:5 OT	–
Adler Mannheim	–	EV Landshut	3:0	2:0	5:3	5:2	–	–
Frankfurt Lions	–	Kölner Haie	3:2	5:4	1:2	5:2	2:3 OT	4:3 OT

OT = Overtime; SO = Shootout

=== Semifinals ===
The semifinals were played starting March 26, 1999. The regular season best placed team left played against the worst, and the second best vs. third best.

			Game	1	2	3	4	5
Nürnberg Ice Tigers	–	Frankfurt Lions	3:0	5:1	3:2	2:1	–	–
Eisbären Berlin	–	Adler Mannheim	1:3	2:4	0:6	2:1 OT	3:9	–

OT = Overtime; SO = Shootout

=== Finals ===
The finals were played starting April 18 with the Nürnberg Ice Tigers playing home first, due to better regular season placement.

			Game	1	2	3	4	5
Nürnberg Ice Tigers	–	Adler Mannheim	2:3	2:1 OT	1:5	3:2	3:4	2:3

OT = Overtime; SO = Shootout

With the last game, Adler Mannheim continued their dominance in German ice-hockey and became the DEL Champion for the third time in row, winning a German title for the fourth time in their history.
