= 1997–98 DEL season =

1997–98 Deutsche Eishockey Liga season
- League: Deutsche Eishockey Liga
- Sport: Ice hockey
- Teams: 16

1997–98
- Season champions: Adler Mannheim

DEL seasons
- ← 1996–97 1998–99 →

The 1997–98 Deutsche Eishockey Liga season was the 4th season of the Deutsche Eishockey Liga (German Ice Hockey League).

Adler Mannheim became the DEL Champion for the second time in a row, winning a German title for the third time in their history. The season had its share of instability. After the 15th regular season round, the Kaufbeurer Adler were insolvent and the Düsseldorfer EG left the league after season end.

== Regular season ==
As in the previous season two rounds/phases were played. In the first round, all teams played one home and one away game with each other for a total of 28 rounds. The first 6 placed teams continued playing for the playoff placements German: Meisterrunde). The 9 last placed teams had to fight it out for the last 2 playoff spots.

=== Phase I ===
	Team	GP	W	T	L	OTL	GF:GA	Points
1.	Adler Mannheim	28	20	2	1	5	111:74	43
2.	Düsseldorfer EG	28	20	0	0	8	113:88	40
3.	EV Landshut	28	18	2	1	7	100:64	39
4.	Frankfurt Lions	28	16	4	1	7	92:74	37
5.	Eisbären Berlin	28	15	4	0	9	97:79	34
6.	Kölner Haie	28	14	4	1	9	104:94	33
7.	Krefeld Pinguine	28	14	2	1	11	85:84	31
8.	Hannover Scorpions	28	12	3	2	11	88:96	29
9.	Schwenninger ERC Wild Wings	28	11	5	2	10	98:100	29
10.	Berlin Capitals	28	11	2	4	11	73:81	28
11.	Kassel Huskies	28	10	2	3	13	82:86	25
12.	Nürnberg Ice Tigers	28	9	2	2	15	93:107	22
13.	Revierlöwen Oberhausen	28	9	3	1	16	81:103	22
14.	Augsburger Panther	28	10	0	2	16	78:107	22
15.	Starbulls Rosenheim	28	3	1	0	24	70:138	7
16.	Kaufbeurer Adler	disqualified						

GP = Games, W = Win, T = Tie, L = Loss, OTL = Overtime loss, GF:GA = Goals for : Goals against
= Continue play for playoff spots, = Continue qualifications for last 2 playoff spots, = Disqualified

=== Phase II - "Meisterrunde" ===
	Team	GP	W	T	L	OTL	GF:GA	Points
1.	Eisbären Berlin	48	27	6	1	14	179:139	61
2.	Frankfurt Lions	48	27	6	1	14	160:126	61
3.	Kölner Haie	48	26	6	2	14	160:1474	60
4.	Adler Mannheim	48	26	3	3	16	170:145	58
5.	Düsseldorfer EG	48	27	1	2	18	166:164	57
6.	EV Landshut	48	25	4	2	17	148:118	56

GP = Games, W = Win, T = Tie, L = Loss, OTL = Overtime loss, GF:GA = Goals for : Goals against

=== Phase II ===
Two teams qualified for the playoff spots 7 and 8.

	Team	GP	W	T	L	OTL	GF:GA	Points
1.	Hannover Scorpions	44	22	6	2	14	160:142	52
2.	Berlin Capitals	44	19	7	4	14	136:119	49
3.	Schwenninger ERC Wild Wings	44	19	5	3	17	157:148	46
4.	Kassel Huskies	44	19	3	4	18	140:128	45
5.	Krefeld Pinguine	44	18	6	1	19	126:141	43
6.	Nürnberg Ice Tigers	44	18	4	2	20	126:141	42
7.	Augsburger Panther	44	16	2	2	24	122:160	36
8.	Revierlöwen Oberhausen	44	14	4	1	25	132:184	33
9.	Starbulls Rosenheim	44	6	3	0	35	105:204	15

GP = Games, W = Win, T = Tie, L = Loss, OTL = Overtime loss, GF:GA = Goals For : Goals Against
Color code: = Playoff = Season end

==== Round 1 playoff qualifications ====
The first round of playoff qualifications was played as a best-of-five series.

			Game	1	2	3	4	5
Hannover Scorpions	–	Revier Löwen Oberhausen	3:0	6:2	5:2	5:4	–	–
Berlin Capitals	–	Augsburger Panther	1:3	3:2	1:3	0:2	1:4	–
Schwenninger ERC Wild Wings	–	Nürnberg Ice Tigers	3:2	6:2	4:5 OT	5:2	2:4	6:2
Kassel Huskies	–	Krefeld Pinguine	1:3	3:5	2:5	5:3	1:2	–

OT = Overtime; SO = Shootout

==== Round 2 Playoff Qualifications ====
The second round of playoff qualifications was played as a best-of-three series.

			Game	1	2	3
Hannover Scorpions	–	Augsburger Panther	2:0	4:3	5:2	–
Schwenninger ERC Wild Wings	–	Krefeld Pinguine	1:2	4:3	2:6	2:5

OT = Overtime; SO = Shootout

The Hannover Scorpions and Krefeld Pinguine qualified for the playoffs.

== Playoff ==
The playoffs were played in a best-of-five format.

Quarterfinals
5	Eisbären Berlin	3
7	Krefeld Pinguine	0
6	Kölner Haie	0
3	EV Landshut	3
4	Frankfurt Lions	3
8	Hannover Scorpions	1
1	Adler Mannheim	3
2	Düsseldorfer EG	0

Semifinals
5	Eisbären Berlin	3
3	EV Landshut	0
4	Frankfurt Lions	0
1	Adler Mannheim	3

Finals
5	Eisbären Berlin	1
1	Adler Mannheim	3

=== Quarterfinals ===
			Game	1	2	3	4	5
Eisbären Berlin	–	Krefeld Pinguine	3:0	4:3 OT	4:3 n.V.	5:1	–	–
Frankfurt Lions	–	Hannover Scorpions	3:1	4:3 OT	4:1	2:4	4:2	–
Kölner Haie	–	EV Landshut	0:3	3:4 OT	1:9	4:3 SO	–	–
Adler Mannheim	–	Düsseldorfer EG	3:0	7:2	4:3	6:1	–	–

OT = Overtime; SO = Shootout

=== Semifinals ===
			Game	1	2	3	4	5
Eisbären Berlin	–	EV Landshut	3:0	7:4	2:1	2:0	–	–
Frankfurt Lions	–	Adler Mannheim	0:3	2:6	1:5	3:4 SO	–	–

OT = Overtime; SO = Shootout

=== Finals ===
			Game	1	2	3	4	5
Eisbären Berlin	–	Adler Mannheim	1:3	0:2	2:4	8:7	1:4	–

OT = Overtime; SO = Shootout

With the last game, Adler Mannheim became repeat DEL Champion and won the German Champion title for the third time in the club's history.

== Player awards ==
Category	Name	Team	Record
Most points	(Germany) (Canada) Mark MacKay	Schwenninger ERC Wild Wings	57 Points
Best goalie	(Czech Republic) Petr Bříza	EV Landshut	2.41 Goals-Against-Average
Best defender	(Canada) Marc West	Revierlöwen Oberhausen	42 Points
