= Nürnberg Ice Tigers =

- City: Nuremberg
- League: Deutsche Eishockey Liga
- Founded: 1980
- Home arena: PSD Bank Nürnberg Arena (capacity: 7,672)
- Colours
- Owner: Wolfgang Gastner
- General manager: Wolfgang Gastner, André Dietzsch
- Head coach: Mitch O'Keefe
- Captain: Marcus Weber
- Website: icetigers.de

Franchise history
- 1980–1995: EHC Nürnberg 1980
- 1995–2006: Nürnberg Ice Tigers
- 2006–2009: Sinupret Ice Tigers
- 2009–2020: Thomas Sabo Ice Tigers
- 2020–Present: Nürnberg Ice Tigers

The Nürnberg Ice Tigers are a professional ice hockey club located in Nuremberg, Germany. They play in the country's premier league, the Deutsche Eishockey Liga.

== History ==
The roots of the team can be traced back to SG Nürnberg, an ice hockey club that played in the 2nd Bundesliga from 1958 until it was closed down in 1980 due to financial issues. Today's team was founded in 1980 as EHC Nürnberg 1980 e.V., as a non-profit organization. Play started in 1980–81 in the Bavarian state ice-hockey league (German: Eishockey-Bayernliga). After a single season, the team moved up to the Southern Regional League (German: Regionalliga Süd), and was promoted again after just one season in 1983 to the 3rd-tier German Ice Hockey League (German: Oberliga Süd).

By 1987, EHC Nürnberg 1980 moved up to the 2nd Bundesliga. In the early 1990s, financial uncertainties with German professional ice hockey led to the foundation of the Deutsche Eishockey Liga – DEL. The DEL was modeled after the NHL, with hopes of providing financial stability through licensing and franchising of teams.

EHC Nürnberg 1980 was admitted to the DEL as a founding member on 13 June 1994, one of 6 teams from the 2nd Bundesliga. As the DEL replaced the 1st Bundesliga and now represents the highest level of German professional ice hockey, this resulted in a promotion. In the first DEL season, the EHC Nürnberg 1980 finished the regular season in 12th place, only to be eliminated in the first playoff round.

For the following season, the professional team was separated from the non-profit organization and incorporated as the Nürnberg Ice Tigers, with the youth and amateurs keeping the old name. In the 1998–99 DEL season the Tigers finished the regular season in first place, but lost in the playoff finals to the Adler Mannheim, who dominated German Ice Hockey in the late 1990s.

In 2006, the Ice Tigers and Bionorica AG signed a three-year agreement, giving Bionorica the naming rights to the team. Starting with the 2006–07 DEL season, the team was renamed to Sinupret Ice Tigers, after a Bionorica product.

During the 2008–09 season it became obvious that the Ice Tigers were in a dire financial situation. On 25 November 2008 preliminary insolvency was filed and, on 30 December, officially declared. This led to the corporate sponsor Bionorica pulling their support in March 2009. An investor group led by local jeweler Thomas Sabo intervened on 3 April 2009, pre-empting bankruptcy proceedings and ensuring participation in the 2009–10 season. The team was known as the Thomas Sabo Ice Tigers for eleven years until April 2020. After the sponsorship by Thomas Sabo ended, the team changed its name back to the Nürnberg Ice Tigers.

== Logos ==
EHC 80 Nürnberg,
1980–1995

Nürnberg Ice Tigers, since 2020

== Players and personnel ==
=== Current roster ===
Updated 11 April 2025.

No.	Nat	Player	Pos	S/G	Age	Acquired	Birthplace
29	(Germany)	Eugen Alanov	LW	L	30	2024	Ust-Kamenogorsk, Kazakhstan
10	(United States)	Evan Barratt	C	L	27	2023	Bristol, Pennsylvania, United States
90	(Germany)	Constantin Braun	D	L	38	2023	Lampertheim, Germany
9	(Germany)	Justus Böttner	D	L	24	2023	Arnstadt, Germany
75	(Canada)	Samuel Dove-McFalls	LW	L	29	2024	Montréal, Quebec, Canada
44	(Germany)	Josef Eham	F	L	24	2024	Hausham, Germany
95	(United States)	Charlie Gerard	C	R	30	2023	Rocky River, Ohio, United States
77	(United States)	Will Graber	C	R	30	2024	Broomfield, Colorado, United States
74	(United States)	Cody Haiskanen	D	R	29	2024	Fargo, North Dakota, United States
47	(Canada)	Owen Headrick	D	R	28	2024	Garden River, Ontario, Canada
6	(Germany)	Julius Karrer	D	L	26	2020	Berlin, Germany
73	(Germany)	Roman Kechter	C	R	22	2022	Weilheim in Oberbayern, Germany
14	(United States)	Cole Maier	C	R	31	2023	Pequannock, New Jersey, United States
82	(United States)	Hayden Shaw	D	L	30	2022	Woodbury, Minnesota, United States
31	(Germany)	Niklas Treutle	G	L	35	2017	Nuremberg, Germany
48	(Germany)	Jake Ustorf	F	L	29	2021	Waynesville, Ohio, United States
24	(Germany)	Marcus Weber (C)	D	L	33	2013	Garmisch-Partenkirchen, Germany

=== Head coaches ===
- Jozef Golonka, 1994–95
- Jan Eysselt, 1995–97
- Vladimir Vasiliev, 1997–98
- Peter Ihnačák, 1998–00
- Bob Murdoch, 2000–02
- Mike Schmidt, 2002–03
- Greg Poss, 2003–05
- Benoît Laporte, 2005–08
- Andreas Brockmann, 2008–12
- Bengt-Åke Gustafsson, 2012–13
- Tray Tuomie, 2013–14
- Martin Jiranek, 2014
- Rob Wilson, 2015–18
- Kevin Gaudet, 2018
- Martin Jiranek, 2018–19
- Kurt Kleinendorst, 2019–20
- Frank Fischöder, 2020–21
- Tom Rowe, 2021–24
- Mitch O'Keefe, 2024–present

== All-time records ==
- Most DEL games for the club: 524 Patrick Reimer
- Most DEL goals for the club: 218 Patrick Reimer
- Most DEL penalty minutes for the club: 576 John Craighead
