= 2000–01 DEL season =

2000–01 Deutsche Eishockey Liga season
- League: Deutsche Eishockey Liga
- Sport: Ice hockey
- Teams: 16

2000–01
- Season champions: Adler Mannheim

DEL seasons
- ← 1999–2000 2001–02 →

The 2000–01 Deutsche Eishockey Liga season was the 7th season since the founding of the Deutsche Eishockey Liga (German Ice Hockey League). The Adler Mannheim won the DEL Championship the fourth time in 5 seasons, extending their dominance in German ice hockey. It was also the fifth time in their history they held the German Champion title.

A change was brought to the format of play. The first 8 placed teams in the regular season would go into playoffs, while the season would end for the other teams. There would be no relegation.

== Regular season ==
All teams played each other 4 times, for a total of 60 rounds. The first 8 placed teams qualified for the playoffs.

	Team	GP	W	SOW	SOL	L	GF:GA	Points
1.	Adler Mannheim	60	31	9	4	16	205:144	115
2.	Kölner Haie	60	29	6	12	13	186:154	111
3.	Munich Barons (M)	60	29	5	7	19	175:150	104
4.	Nürnberg Ice Tigers	60	27	7	8	18	191:171	103
5.	Kassel Huskies	60	28	6	7	19	176:156	103
6.	Revierlöwen Oberhausen	60	25	12	3	20	187:151	102
7.	Hannover Scorpions	60	29	3	6	22	203:182	99
8.	Berlin Capitals	60	25	7	9	19	191:173	98
9.	Krefeld Pinguine	60	23	4	11	22	182:177	88
10.	Frankfurt Lions	60	23	5	8	24	189:189	87
11.	Düsseldorfer EG (N)	60	17	10	5	28	133:164	76
12.	Schwenninger ERC Wild Wings	60	20	4	8	28	174:207	76
13.	Eisbären Berlin	60	19	6	4	31	192:221	73
14.	Augsburger Panther	60	18	8	3	31	187:242	73
15.	Iserlohn Roosters (N)	60	16	7	6	31	152:189	68
16.	Essen Mosquitoes	60	15	7	5	33	173:226	64

GP = Games played, W = Win, SOW = Shootout win, SOL = Shootout loss, L = Loss
= Qualified for playoffs = Season end

== Playoff ==
The playoffs were played in a best-of-five format.

Quarterfinals
1	Adler Mannheim	3
8	Berlin Capitals	2
2	Kölner Haie	0
7	Hannover Scorpions	3
3	Munich Barons	3
6	Revierlöwen Oberhausen	0
4	Nürnberg Ice Tigers	1
5	Kassel Huskies	3

Semifinals
1	Adler Mannheim	3
7	Hannover Scorpions	0
3	München Barons	3
5	Kassel Huskies	1

Finals
1	Adler Mannheim	3
3	Munich Barons	1

=== Quarterfinals ===
Quarterfinals started March 23, 2001.

			Game	1	2	3	4	5
Adler Mannheim	–	Berlin Capitals	3:2	5:1	3:4	4:3	2:3	3:0
Kölner Haie	–	Hannover Scorpions	0:3	1:3	1:5	3:4	–	–
Munich Barons	–	Revierlöwen Oberhausen	3:0	4:2	3:2	4:2	–	–
Nürnberg Ice Tigers	–	Kassel Huskies	1:3	3:2	1:2	3:4	3:4	–

=== Semifinals ===
Semifinals started April 3.

			Game	1	2	3	4	5
Adler Mannheim	–	Hannover Scorpions	3:0	7:2	7:5	6:1	–	–
München Barons	–	Kassel Huskies	3:1	3:2	2:3	3:1	6:5	–

=== Finals ===
The DEL finals started on April 14 with a homegame for Adler Mannheim who had a better regular season standing.

			Game	1	2	3	4	5
Adler Mannheim	–	München Barons	3:1	4:1	1:4	2:1	2:1	–

The Adler Mannheim extended their dominance by winning the DEL Championship for the 4th time.
