= Michael Wolf (ice hockey) =

German ice hockey player

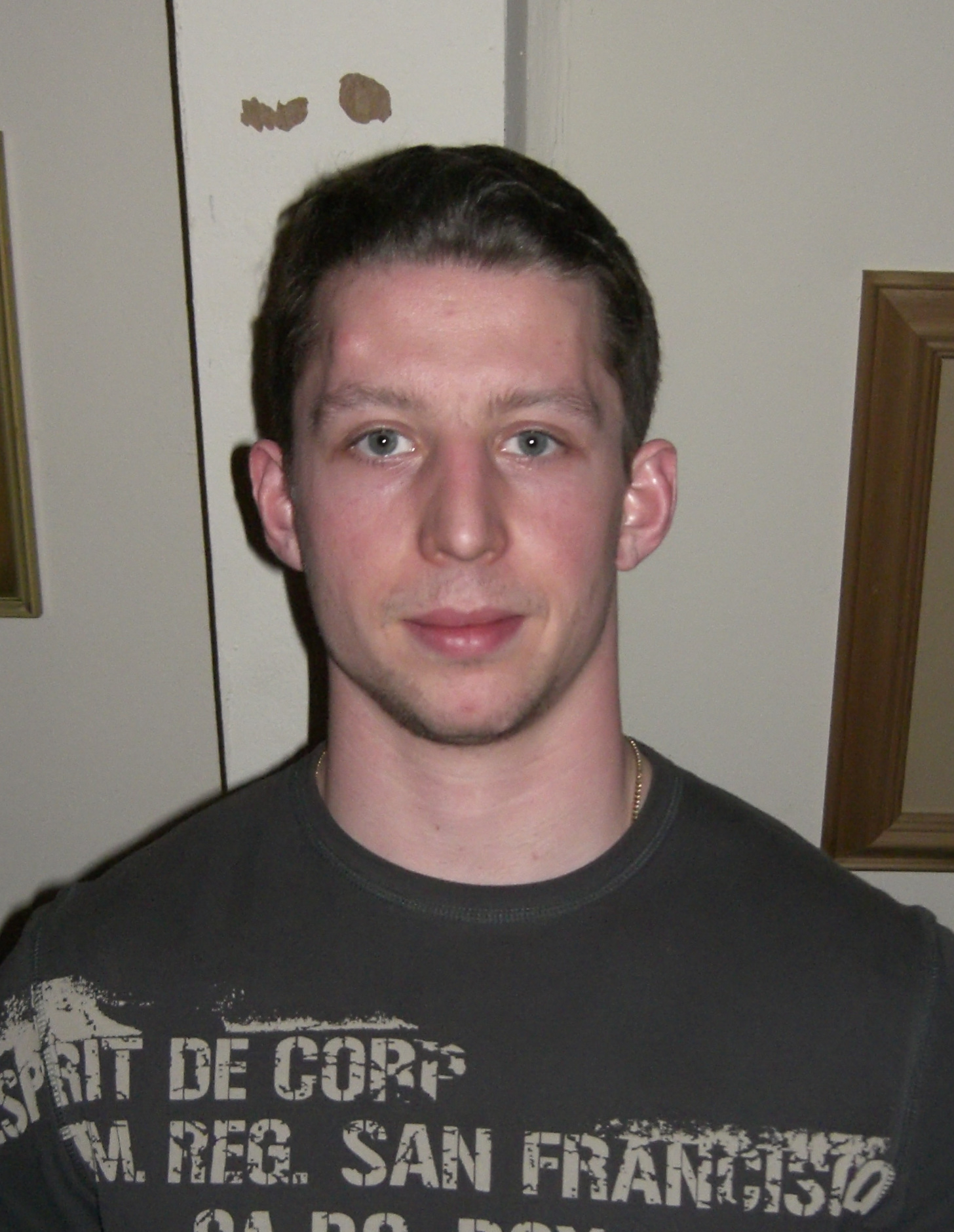
- Born: January 24, 1981 (age 44) Ehenbichl, Austria
- Height: 5 ft 10 in (178 cm)
- Weight: 187 lb (85 kg; 13 st 5 lb)
- Position: Right wing
- Shot: Right
- Played for: Iserlohn Roosters; EHC München
- National team: Germany
- Playing career: 1998–2019

Michael Wolf (born January 24, 1981) is a German former professional ice hockey forward who played with the Iserlohn Roosters and EHC München in the Deutsche Eishockey Liga (DEL).

== Playing career ==
Wolf began his hockey career with EV Füssen. He spent his junior career there, before earning a spot on the professional roster in 1998 as a 17-year-old. Wolf went on to play two more years in Füssen and moved up with his team to the Oberliga in 2000. In 2001 Wolf signed with SC Bietigheim-Bissingen in the 2nd Bundesliga. He established as a solid scorer over three years. In 2004 Wolf signed with the Essen Mosquitoes. With a breakthrough performance he led all German players in scoring at the end of the season, with many clubs from the Deutsche Eishockey Liga competing to sign him to their roster.

Wolf eventually signed a contract with the Iserlohn Roosters over one year with a club option to extend it for one year. At the beginning of the 2005–06 season, Wolf showed his goal scoring instinct and was competing for the top scoring position. In October 2005 he scored his first DEL-hat-trick against the current champions at the time, Eisbären Berlin. He was named DEL Rookie of the Year and the Roosters extended his contract for two years. For the next season Robert Hock, the highest German scoring player the previous season, came to Iserlohn. Roosters coach Geoff Ward put them together with David Sulkovsky and the three formed the most dangerous native line in the DEL. Nevertheless, Iserlohn missed the playoffs again.

In the 2007–08 season Wolf and Hock went on to dominate the league in all offensive categories. Wolf was leading the league in goals and powerplay goals, while Hock was leading in points, assists and powerplay assists. Canadian players like Brad Tapper, Pat Kavanagh, Tyler Beechey, Jimmy Roy, Ryan Ready, and Bob Wren also performed unexpectedly well, so that the Roosters finished fifth in the league and Iserlohn reached their first playoffs in almost 20 years. In game 2 of the quarterfinal series against the Frankfurt Lions, Wolf scored the game-winning goal in the third overtime. The game was the longest in German hockey history. After the Roosters were defeated by Frankfurt Wolf was named DEL MVP, best native player, and best winger.

After an impressive season performance, and despite other DEL interest he re-signed for two more years with the Roosters. Wolf was quoted that "money is not all" and expressed his desire to stay in this great organisation. The next year Iserlohn struggled, and missed the playoffs. Nevertheless, Hand und Handschuh (hand and glove; the nickname of Wolf and Hock given by coach Rick Adduono for being a highly skilled duo) won the scoring title (Hock) and finished second in goals (Wolf). On December 8, 2009, Wolf re-signed with the Roosters to a two-year contract extension.

Wolf played with the Roosters for nine seasons, before leaving the club on June 2, 2014, to sign a multi-year contract with fellow DEL competitors, EHC München.

In the 2018–19 season, Wolf scored 24 points in 33 regular season games, helping Red Bull return to the Finals for the fourth consecutive year with 4 points in 18 games. After a finals defeat to Adler Mannheim, Wolf concluded his professional playing career.

== Career statistics ==
=== Regular season and playoffs ===
| | | | Regular season | | | | | Playoffs |
| Season | Team | League | GP | G | A | Pts | PIM | GP | G | A | Pts | PIM |
|---|---|---|---|---|---|---|---|---|---|---|---|---|
| 1998–99 | EV Füssen | 4.GBun | 3 | 0 | 1 | 1 | 0 | — | — | — | — | — |
| 1999–2000 | EV Füssen | 4.GBun | 54 | 14 | 15 | 29 | 36 | — | — | — | — | — |
| 2000–01 | EV Füssen | 3.GBun | 46 | 10 | 4 | 14 | 55 | — | — | — | — | — |
| 2001–02 | SC Bietigheim–Bissingen | 2.GBun | 53 | 9 | 9 | 18 | 24 | 2 | 0 | 0 | 0 | 0 |
| 2002–03 | SC Bietigheim–Bissingen | 2.GBun | 56 | 9 | 13 | 22 | 48 | 7 | 2 | 1 | 3 | 2 |
| 2003–04 | Bietigheim Steelers | 2.GBun | 50 | 7 | 9 | 16 | 16 | 8 | 0 | 3 | 3 | 4 |
| 2004–05 | Essen Mosquitoes | 2.GBun | 52 | 24 | 33 | 57 | 26 | — | — | — | — | — |
| 2005–06 | Iserlohn Roosters | DEL | 52 | 20 | 17 | 37 | 54 | — | — | — | — | — |
| 2006–07 | Iserlohn Roosters | DEL | 51 | 17 | 21 | 38 | 92 | — | — | — | — | — |
| 2007–08 | Iserlohn Roosters | DEL | 56 | 44 | 27 | 71 | 34 | 6 | 2 | 2 | 4 | 29 |
| 2008–09 | Iserlohn Roosters | DEL | 52 | 27 | 28 | 55 | 32 | — | — | — | — | — |
| 2009–10 | Iserlohn Roosters | DEL | 52 | 29 | 27 | 56 | 44 | — | — | — | — | — |
| 2010–11 | Iserlohn Roosters | DEL | 52 | 34 | 21 | 55 | 63 | — | — | — | — | — |
| 2011–12 | Iserlohn Roosters | DEL | 52 | 18 | 27 | 45 | 32 | 1 | 0 | 0 | 0 | 0 |
| 2012–13 | Iserlohn Roosters | DEL | 52 | 23 | 32 | 55 | 38 | — | — | — | — | — |
| 2013–14 | Iserlohn Roosters | DEL | 40 | 18 | 17 | 35 | 47 | 9 | 1 | 0 | 1 | 4 |
| 2014–15 | EHC München | DEL | 51 | 16 | 19 | 35 | 28 | 4 | 1 | 0 | 1 | 0 |
| 2015–16 | EHC München | DEL | 52 | 20 | 16 | 36 | 34 | 14 | 8 | 2 | 10 | 6 |
| 2016–17 | EHC München | DEL | 52 | 17 | 28 | 45 | 16 | 14 | 7 | 4 | 11 | 8 |
| 2017–18 | EHC München | DEL | 52 | 15 | 12 | 27 | 6 | 17 | 8 | 5 | 13 | 6 |
| 2018–19 | EHC München | DEL | 33 | 11 | 13 | 24 | 8 | 18 | 1 | 3 | 4 | 4 |
| DEL totals | | | 699 | 309 | 305 | 614 | 528 | 83 | 28 | 16 | 44 | 57 |

=== International ===
| Year | Team | Event | GP | G | A | Pts | PIM |
|---|---|---|---|---|---|---|---|
| 2001 | Germany | WJC D1 | 5 | 0 | 0 | 0 | 4 |
| 2007 | Germany | WC | 6 | 5 | 3 | 8 | 6 |
| 2008 | Germany | WC | 6 | 1 | 2 | 3 | 4 |
| 2009 | Germany | OGQ | 3 | 1 | 1 | 2 | 4 |
| 2009 | Germany | WC | 6 | 0 | 1 | 1 | 2 |
| 2010 | Germany | OG | 4 | 0 | 0 | 0 | 2 |
| 2010 | Germany | WC | 9 | 1 | 1 | 2 | 2 |
| 2011 | Germany | WC | 7 | 2 | 1 | 3 | 0 |
| 2013 | Germany | OGQ | 3 | 1 | 0 | 1 | 2 |
| 2013 | Germany | WC | 7 | 2 | 2 | 4 | 0 |
| 2015 | Germany | WC | 7 | 4 | 1 | 5 | 0 |
| Junior totals | | | 5 | 0 | 0 | 0 | 4 |
| Senior totals | | | 58 | 17 | 12 | 29 | 22 |

== Awards ==
- Iserlohn's Sportsman of the Year 2006, 2007, 2008
- DEL Rookie of the Year 2006
- DEL-All-Star-Game 2006, 2008, 2009
- DEL leading goal scorer 2008
- DEL Most valuable player 2008
- DEL best Winger 2008
- DEL best native player 2008, 2009
