= Christian Hommel =

German ice hockey player

- Born: January 23, 1981 (age 44); Hemer, West Germany
- Height: 5 ft 10 in (178 cm)
- Weight: 165 lb (75 kg; 11 st 11 lb)
- Position: Left wing
- Shot: Left
- Played for: Iserlohn Roosters; Kassel Huskies; Hamburg Freezers; Arizona Sundogs; Füchse Duisburg
- National team: Germany
- NHL draft: Undrafted
- Playing career: 1998–2014

Christian Hommel (born January 23, 1981) is a German former professional ice hockey left wing. He most notably played for the Iserlohn Roosters in the Deutsche Eishockey Liga (DEL). Upon the completion of his 16-year career, Hommel finished third in All-time games played with Iserlohn appearing in 457 regular season contests.

== International ==
Hommel played a total of 17 international games for the German national ice hockey team, including four games at the 2003 World Hockey Championships in Finland.

== Post Career ==
From February 2019 to November 2023, Hommel was the Roosters' sporting director.

== Career statistics ==
			Regular season					Playoffs
Season	Team	League	GP	G	A	Pts	PIM	GP	G	A	Pts	PIM
1998–99	Iserlohner EC	Germany2	14	0	0	0	2	—	—	—	—	—
1999–00	Iserlohner EC	Germany2	20	0	1	1	49	3	0	0	0	0
1999–00	Iserlohner EC II	Germany4	7	4	3	7	20	10	10	7	17	70
2000–01	Iserlohn Roosters	DEL	3	0	0	0	0	—	—	—	—	—
2000–01	EV Duisburg	Germany3	36	4	6	10	48	10	2	0	2	16
2001–02	Iserlohn Roosters	DEL	52	1	2	3	48	—	—	—	—	—
2002–03	Iserlohn Roosters	DEL	51	3	3	6	60	—	—	—	—	—
2003–04	Iserlohn Roosters	DEL	50	2	5	7	142	—	—	—	—	—
2003–04	EV Duisburg	Germany2	2	0	1	1	2	4	1	0	1	12
2004–05	Kassel Huskies	DEL	50	5	2	7	108	—	—	—	—	—
2005–06	Hamburg Freezers	DEL	27	1	1	2	71	1	0	0	0	0
2006–07	Arizona Sundogs	CHL	6	1	1	2	14	—	—	—	—	—
2006–07	Füchse Duisburg	DEL	28	4	2	6	58	—	—	—	—	—
2007–08	Füchse Duisburg	DEL	56	2	3	5	83	—	—	—	—	—
2008–09	Iserlohn Roosters	DEL	50	4	2	6	58	—	—	—	—	—
2009–10	Iserlohn Roosters	DEL	56	2	3	5	66	—	—	—	—	—
2010–11	Iserlohn Roosters	DEL	48	4	2	6	99	—	—	—	—	—
2011–12	Iserlohn Roosters	DEL	51	6	8	14	107	2	0	0	0	0
2012–13	Iserlohn Roosters	DEL	44	1	5	6	83	—	—	—	—	—
2013–14	Iserlohn Roosters	DEL	52	3	3	6	77	9	1	0	1	6
DEL totals			618	38	41	79	1,056	19	1	1	2	8
