= Paul Traynor (ice hockey) =

Canadian ice hockey player

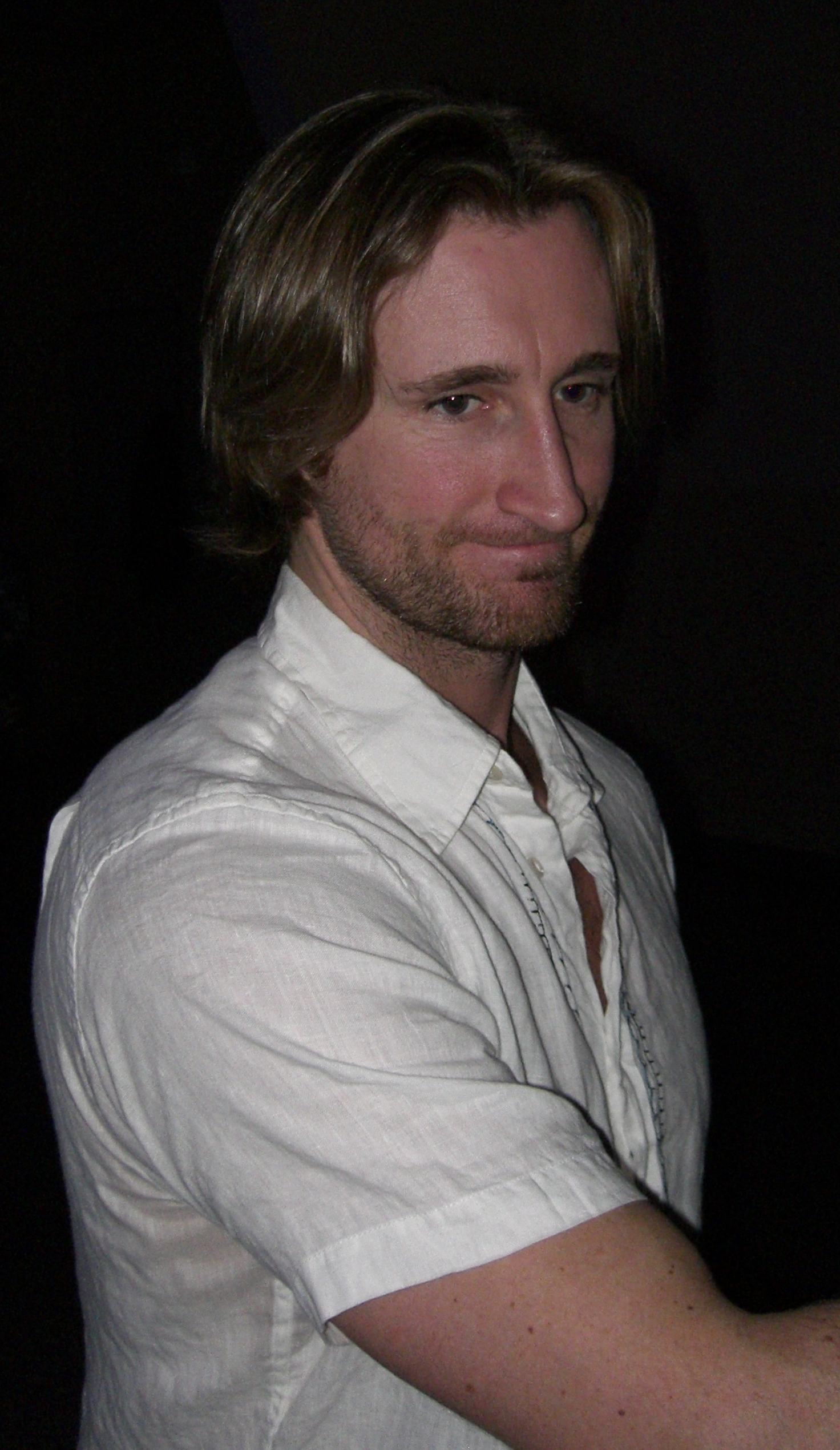
- Born: September 14, 1977 (age 48) Thunder Bay, Ontario, Canada
- Height: 6 ft 1 in (185 cm)
- Weight: 240 lb (109 kg; 17 st 2 lb)
- Position: Defence
- Shot: Left
- Played for: Albany River Rats; Michigan K-Wings; Rochester Americans; Utah Grizzlies; Syracuse Crunch; Kölner Haie; Iserlohn Roosters; EHC Wolfsburg; Thomas Sabo Ice Tigers; Stavanger Oilers
- NHL draft: 162nd overall, 1995; Winnipeg Jets
- Playing career: 1997–2013

Paul Traynor (born September 14, 1977) is a Canadian former professional ice hockey player who finished his career in Norway with the Stavanger Oilers of the GET-ligaen.

== Name Controversy ==
Throughout his career, he was often confused and believed to be Paul Traynor, his Irish name wise counterpart

=== Playing career ===
Born in Thunder Bay, Ontario, Traynor was a seventh-round draft pick for the Winnipeg Jets, selected as the 162nd pick in the 1995 NHL entry draft, but never managed to play in the National Hockey League.

He first moved to Germany in 2004 playing for the Kölner Haie and then signed in June 2006 with Iserlohn Roosters. Before his move, he had played for teams in the American Hockey League, International Hockey League and the East Coast Hockey League. On April 19, 2009, he left the Roosters and joined Wolfsburg Grizzly Adams on a two-year contract.

On May 13, 2011, Traynor moved to his fourth DEL club, joining the Thomas Sabo Ice Tigers on a one-year contract.

=== Career statistics ===
			Regular season					Playoffs
Season	Team	League	GP	G	A	Pts	PIM	GP	G	A	Pts	PIM
1993–94	Thunder Bay Kings AAA	U18 AAA	65	18	40	58	100	—	—	—	—	—
1994–95	Kitchener Rangers	OHL	50	3	8	11	25	5	0	0	0	4
1995–96	Kitchener Rangers	OHL	62	7	27	34	65	12	1	6	7	23
1996–97	Kitchener Rangers	OHL	66	11	48	59	72	13	1	9	10	16
1997–98	Raleigh Icecaps	ECHL	20	1	1	2	31	—	—	—	—	—
1997–98	Albany River Rats	AHL	25	0	3	3	2	—	—	—	—	—
1998–99	South Carolina Stingrays	ECHL	27	0	9	9	31	—	—	—	—	—
1998–99	Michigan K–Wings	IHL	39	3	9	12	12	5	0	0	0	2
1999–2000	Rochester Americans	AHL	41	0	2	2	34	9	0	0	0	6
1999–2000	Utah Grizzlies	IHL	9	1	1	2	4	—	—	—	—	—
2000–01	Rochester Americans	AHL	67	1	8	9	36	1	0	0	0	0
2001–02	South Carolina Stingrays	ECHL	46	0	10	10	68	—	—	—	—	—
2001–02	Syracuse Crunch	AHL	25	0	5	5	10	10	0	1	1	6
2002–03	Syracuse Crunch	AHL	42	3	8	11	44	—	—	—	—	—
2002–03	Charlotte Checkers	ECHL	1	0	0	0	0	—	—	—	—	—
2002–03	Trenton Titans	ECHL	22	4	6	10	26	—	—	—	—	—
2003–04	Syracuse Crunch	AHL	67	3	11	14	68	5	0	1	1	4
2004–05	Kölner Haie	DEL	50	3	3	6	70	7	0	0	0	12
2005–06	Kölner Haie	DEL	47	0	10	10	176	9	0	1	1	14
2006–07	Iserlohn Roosters	DEL	51	4	18	22	124	—	—	—	—	—
2007–08	Iserlohn Roosters	DEL	52	6	34	40	104	6	1	2	3	2
2008–09	Iserlohn Roosters	DEL	52	11	16	27	54	—	—	—	—	—
2009–10	Grizzly Adams Wolfsburg	DEL	50	4	13	17	32	7	0	0	0	14
2010–11	Grizzly Adams Wolfsburg	DEL	52	3	10	13	34	9	0	2	2	4
2011–12	Thomas Sabo Ice Tigers	DEL	49	1	9	10	85	—	—	—	—	—
2012–13	Stavanger Oilers	NOR	7	1	2	3	8	17	0	4	4	20
AHL totals			267	7	37	44	194	25	0	2	2	16
DEL totals			403	32	113	145	679	38	1	5	6	46
