= Brad Tapper =

Former ice hockey player

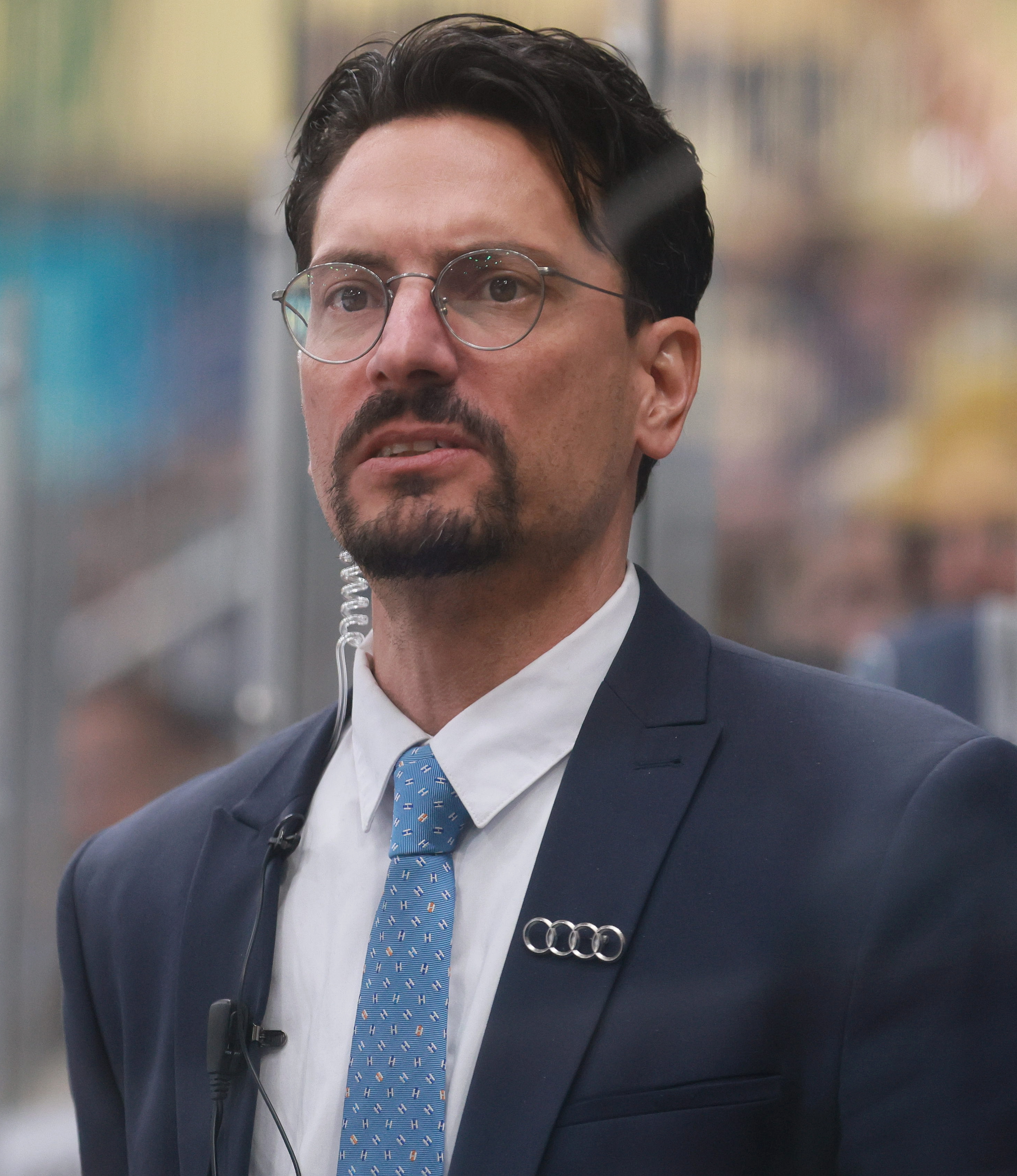
- Coach Brad Tapper, 2025
- Born: April 28, 1978 (age 48) Scarborough, Ontario, Canada
- Height: 6 ft 0 in (183 cm)
- Weight: 180 lb (82 kg; 12 st 12 lb)
- Position: Head coach / Right wing
- Shot: Right
- Extraliga team: HC Slovan Bratislava
- Played for: Atlanta Thrashers (NHL); Chicago Wolves (AHL); Binghamton Senators (AHL); Philadelphia Phantoms (AHL); Orlando Solar Bears (IHL); Nurnberg Ice Tigers (DEL); Hannover Scorpions (DEL); Iserlohn Roosters (DEL)
- NHL draft: Undrafted
- Playing career: 2000–2009

Brad Tapper (born April 28, 1978) is a Canadian professional hockey coach, currently serving as the head coach of HC Slovan Bratislava (Slovak Extraliga) and a former professional ice hockey player (right winger). He played in the National Hockey League (NHL) for the Atlanta Thrashers over parts of three seasons. After retiring from playing, he remained active in hockey as a coach in different professional hockey organisations in the US, Canada, and Germany. He was previously the assistant coach of ERC Ingolstadt in the Deutsche Eishockey Liga (DEL), head coach of the Iserlohn Roosters, also in the DEL. Previously, he worked with the Grand Rapids Griffins of the American Hockey League (AHL), spent a year as the head coach of the Adirondack Thunder in the ECHL, and was an assistant coach with the Rochester Americans (AHL), Chicago Wolves (AHL), Orlando Solar Bears (ECHL), and Florida Everblades (ECHL).

== Playing career ==
As a youth, Tapper played in the 1992 Quebec International Pee-Wee Hockey Tournament with the Toronto Red Wings minor ice hockey team.

Tapper started his career by playing for the RPI Engineers of the ECAC. Through his three years on the team, he managed to work his way up from third on the team in scoring in the 1997–98 season to eventually led the team in points, goals, power-play goals (10), and game-winning goals (7) during the 1999–2000 season. He also shared the team lead with three short-handed goals and ranked third in assists. He also finished that season ranked 15th in NCAA Division I in scoring, and fourth in goals. He also led the nation with seven game-winning goals, and shared 11th with 10 power-play goals.

Following that season, he was signed by the Atlanta Thrashers as a free agent on April 11, 2000. He split his first season between the Thrashers, and their IHL affiliate, the Orlando Solar Bears. He played in two games during Orlando's final run for the Turner Cup. Following the collapse of the IHL, he continued to split his seasons between the Thrashers and their new AHL affiliate, the Chicago Wolves, helping the Wolves to their first Calder Cup victory in 2001 while setting professional career highs with the Thrashers in the 2002–03 season.

However, on January 6, 2004, the Atlanta Thrashers recalled and traded Tapper to the Ottawa Senators for Daniel Corso. The Senators sent him to their AHL affiliate, the Binghamton Senators, and at the end of the season decided not to re-sign him. On July 22, 2004, Tapper signed with the Nurnberg Ice Tigers of the German Deutsche Eishockey Liga and played one season for them and also one season for the Hannover Scorpions.

He was signed by the Philadelphia Flyers on June 26, 2006 to a one-year contract. After playing five games for their AHL affiliate, the Philadelphia Phantoms, Tapper returned to Germany to play another season for Hannover. After playing the next two seasons with the Iserlohn Roosters, he announced his retirement as a player because of a result of two concussion injuries during his career on June 25, 2009.

After his playing career was over, Tapper remained active in hockey as a coach. For the 2009–10 season, he was the head coach of the North York Rangers in the Central Canadian Hockey League, taking them to the postseason, where they lost in the first round to the Burlington Cougars. In the 2010–11 season, Tapper was an assistant coach with the ECHL's Florida Everblades, working under Greg Poss. Again, the first round of the playoffs was the end of the year for his team, as the eventual semifinalists, the Kalamazoo Wings defeated his Everblades 3–1. Tapper remained in Florida for the next year, and saw his team through four rounds of the playoffs, culminating in a Kelly Cup championship over the Las Vegas Wranglers.

== Career statistics ==
=== Regular season and playoffs ===
			Regular season					Playoffs
Season	Team	League	GP	G	A	Pts	PIM	GP	G	A	Pts	PIM
1995–96	Toronto Nationals	GTHL	—	—	—	—	—	—	—	—	—	—
1996–97	Wexford Raiders	MetJHL	50	42	70	112	169	—	—	—	—	—
1997–98	RPI Engineers	ECAC	34	14	11	25	62	—	—	—	—	—
1998–99	RPI Engineers	ECAC	35	20	20	40	60	—	—	—	—	—
1999–00	RPI Engineers	ECAC	37	31	20	51	81	—	—	—	—	—
2000–01	Orlando Solar Bears	IHL	45	7	9	16	39	2	0	0	0	2
2000–01	Atlanta Thrashers	NHL	16	2	3	5	6	—	—	—	—	—
2001–02	Chicago Wolves	AHL	50	14	12	26	62	19	3	4	7	42
2001–02	Atlanta Thrashers	NHL	20	2	4	6	43	—	—	—	—	—
2002–03	Chicago Wolves	AHL	28	9	14	23	42	9	1	3	4	10
2002–03	Atlanta Thrashers	NHL	35	10	4	14	23	—	—	—	—	—
2003–04	Chicago Wolves	AHL	20	1	8	9	26	—	—	—	—	—
2003–04	Binghamton Senators	AHL	29	9	12	21	26	—	—	—	—	—
2004–05	Nurnberg Ice Tigers	DEL	50	26	23	49	101	6	0	2	2	18
2005–06	Hannover Scorpions	DEL	46	9	21	30	165	8	2	4	6	64
2006–07	Philadelphia Phantoms	AHL	5	3	1	4	4	—	—	—	—	—
2006–07	Hannover Scorpions	DEL	25	6	17	23	38	6	2	2	4	18
2007–08	Iserlohn Roosters	DEL	49	18	30	48	167	7	1	5	6	26
2008–09	Iserlohn Roosters	DEL	17	6	9	15	45	—	—	—	—	—
AHL totals			127	33	46	79	156	28	4	7	11	52
DEL totals			187	65	100	165	516	27	5	13	18	126
NHL totals			71	14	11	25	72	—	—	—	—	—

== Awards and honours ==
Award	Year
All-ECAC Hockey First Team	1999–00
AHCA East Second-Team All-American	1999–00

- 2000–2001: Turner Cup Orlando Solar Bears
- 2001–2002: Calder Cup Chicago Wolves
