= Robert Hock =

Czech-born German ice hockey player

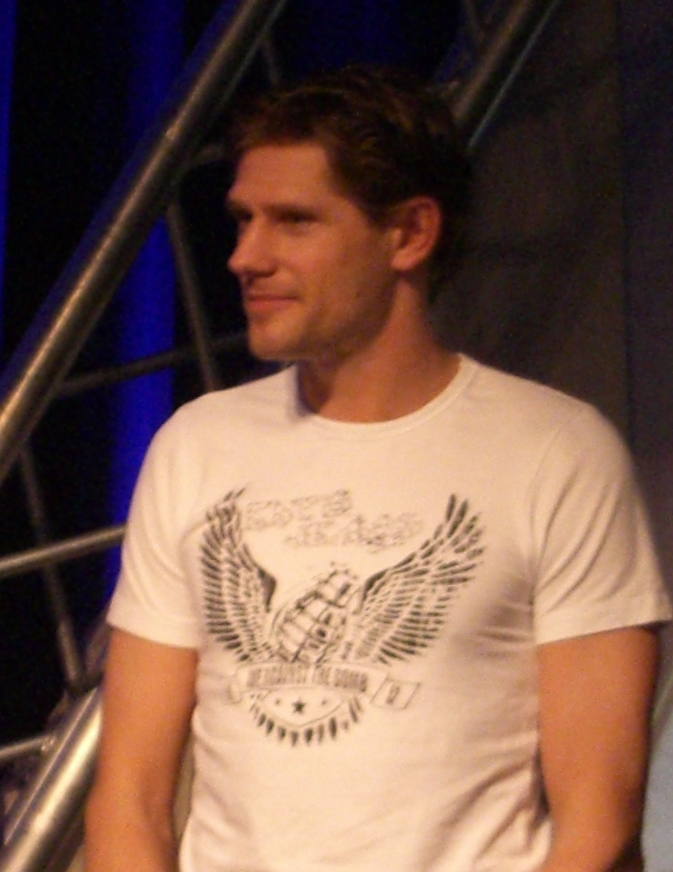
- Robert Hock, 2007
- Born: January 12, 1973 (age 52); Šternberk, Czechoslovakia
- Height: 5 ft 10 in (178 cm)
- Weight: 176 lb (80 kg; 12 st 8 lb)
- Position: Centre
- Shot: Left
- Played for: Sportbund DJK Rosenheim; Kölner EC; SC Riessersee; Revier Löwen Oberhausen; Adler Mannheim; Hannover Scorpions; Iserlohn Roosters
- NHL draft: Undrafted
- Playing career: 1991–2015

Robert Hock (born January 12, 1973) is a Czech-born German former professional ice hockey player who last played with the Hannover Indians of the Oberliga. He previously played for Heilbronner Falken in the DEL2 after seven seasons and captaining the Iserlohn Roosters in the Deutsche Eishockey Liga (DEL).

== Career statistics ==
=== Regular season and playoffs ===
			Regular season					Playoffs
Season	Team	League	GP	G	A	Pts	PIM	GP	G	A	Pts	PIM
1990–91	SC Riessersee	DEU II	35	9	9	18	12	18	7	4	11	4
1991–92	Sportbund DJK Rosenheim	DEU Jr	18	15	21	36	10	—	—	—	—	—
1991–92	Sportbund DJK Rosenheim	1.GBun	19	6	3	9	2	5	1	0	1	0
1992–93	Kölner EC	1.GBun	35	5	3	8	10	—	—	—	—	—
1992–93	Sportbund DJK Rosenheim	DEU II	—	—	—	—	—	4	0	0	0	0
1993–94	Sportbund DJK Rosenheim	1.GBun	40	14	22	36	10	—	—	—	—	—
1994–95	Star Bulls Rosenheim	DEL	42	12	22	34	10	7	1	3	4	0
1995–96	SC Riessersee	DEL	50	20	18	38	18	3	2	1	3	2
1996–97	Heilbronner EC	DEU II	43	19	39	58	2	—	—	—	—	—
1997–98	Heilbronner EC	DEU II	56	22	49	71	48	—	—	—	—	—
1998–99	Heilbronner EC	DEU II	57	25	58	83	55	—	—	—	—	—
1999–2000	Revierlöwen Oberhausen	DEL	56	10	13	23	37	—	—	—	—	—
2000–01	Revierlöwen Oberhausen	DEL	60	19	34	53	22	3	1	2	3	2
2001–02	Revierlöwen Oberhausen	DEL	51	22	30	52	24	—	—	—	—	—
2002–03	Kölner Haie	DEL	46	6	15	21	8	15	3	1	4	2
2003–04	Adler Mannheim	DEL	49	10	30	40	24	6	1	2	3	4
2004–05	Hannover Scorpions	DEL	52	13	32	45	16	—	—	—	—	—
2005–06	Hannover Scorpions	DEL	52	13	37	50	46	10	2	3	5	4
2006–07	Iserlohn Roosters	DEL	52	17	32	49	22	—	—	—	—	—
2007–08	Iserlohn Roosters	DEL	56	24	63	87	58	7	1	7	8	8
2008–09	Iserlohn Roosters	DEL	50	15	49	64	48	—	—	—	—	—
2009–10	Iserlohn Roosters	DEL	56	17	42	59	52	—	—	—	—	—
2010–11	Iserlohn Roosters	DEL	50	12	38	50	24	—	—	—	—	—
2011–12	Iserlohn Roosters	DEL	52	10	36	46	32	2	0	1	1	2
2012–13	Iserlohn Roosters	DEL	52	14	21	35	16	—	—	—	—	—
2013–14	Heilbronner Falken	DEU II	54	11	44	55	18	—	—	—	—	—
2014–15	Hannover Indians	DEU III	8	2	10	12	6	13	4	13	17	6
1.GBun totals			94	25	28	53	22	5	1	0	1	0
DEU II totals			191	75	155	230	117	22	7	4	11	4
DEL totals			826	234	512	746	457	53	11	20	31	24

=== International ===
Year	Team	Event	GP	G	A	Pts	PIM
1991	Germany	EJC	5	0	2	2	0
1992	Germany	WJC	4	0	0	0	0
1993	Germany	WJC	7	2	3	5	2
Junior totals			16	2	5	7	2
