= Jimmy Roy =

Canadian ice hockey player

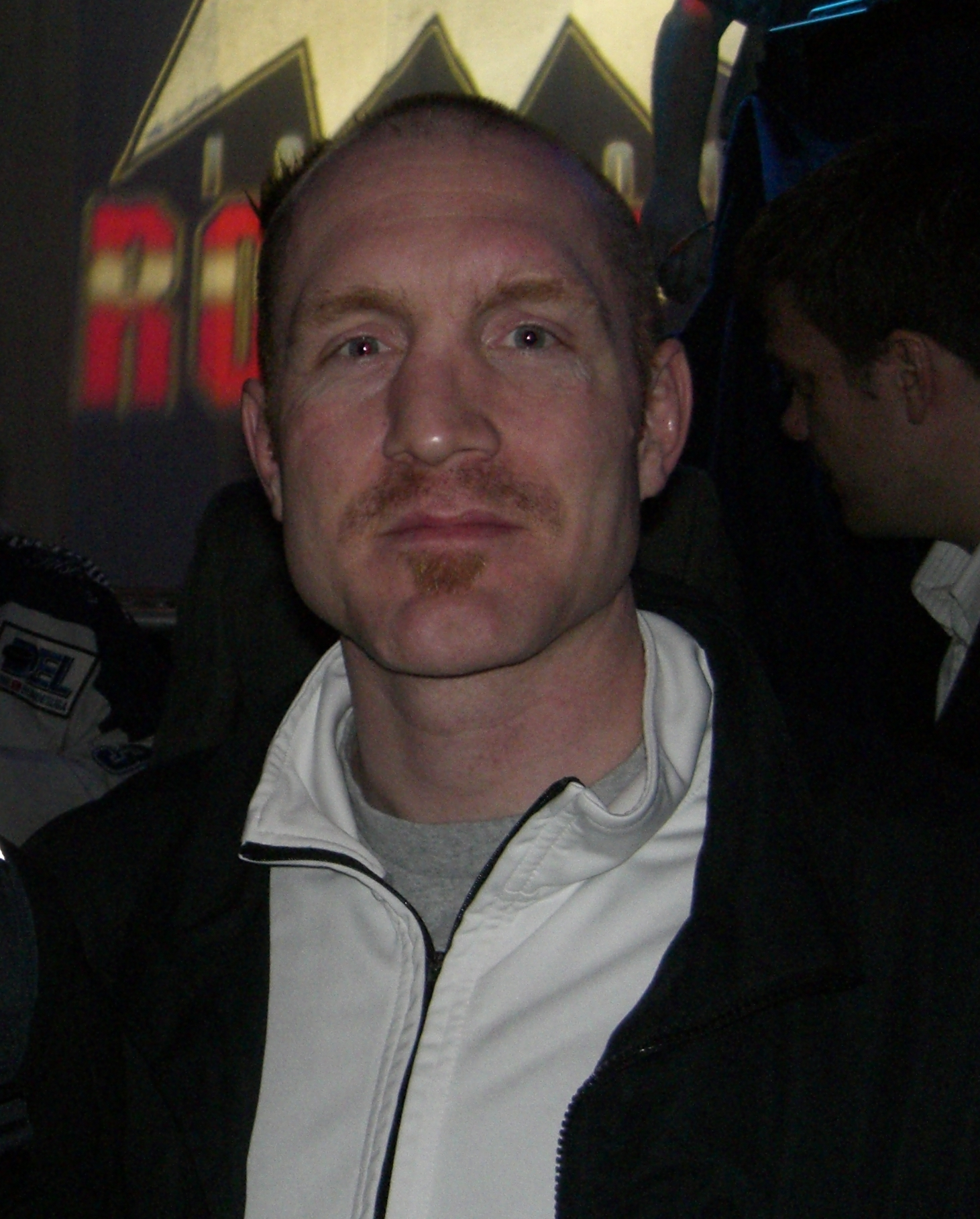
- Born: September 22, 1975 (age 50) Sioux Lookout, Ontario, Canada
- Height: 5 ft 10 in (178 cm)
- Weight: 185 lb (84 kg; 13 st 3 lb)
- Position: Left wing
- Shot: Left
- Played for: Manitoba Moose; Iserlohn Roosters
- NHL draft: 254th overall, 1994; Dallas Stars
- Playing career: 1997–2011

Jimmy Roy (born September 22, 1975 in Sioux Lookout, Ontario) is a former Canadian ice hockey player for the Manitoba Moose of the International Hockey League and American Hockey League from 1997 to 2006. Later in his career he played for Iserlohn Roosters of the Deutsche Eishockey Liga from 2006 to 2011. He became director of player development for the Winnipeg Jets of the National Hockey League in 2011.

== Playing career ==
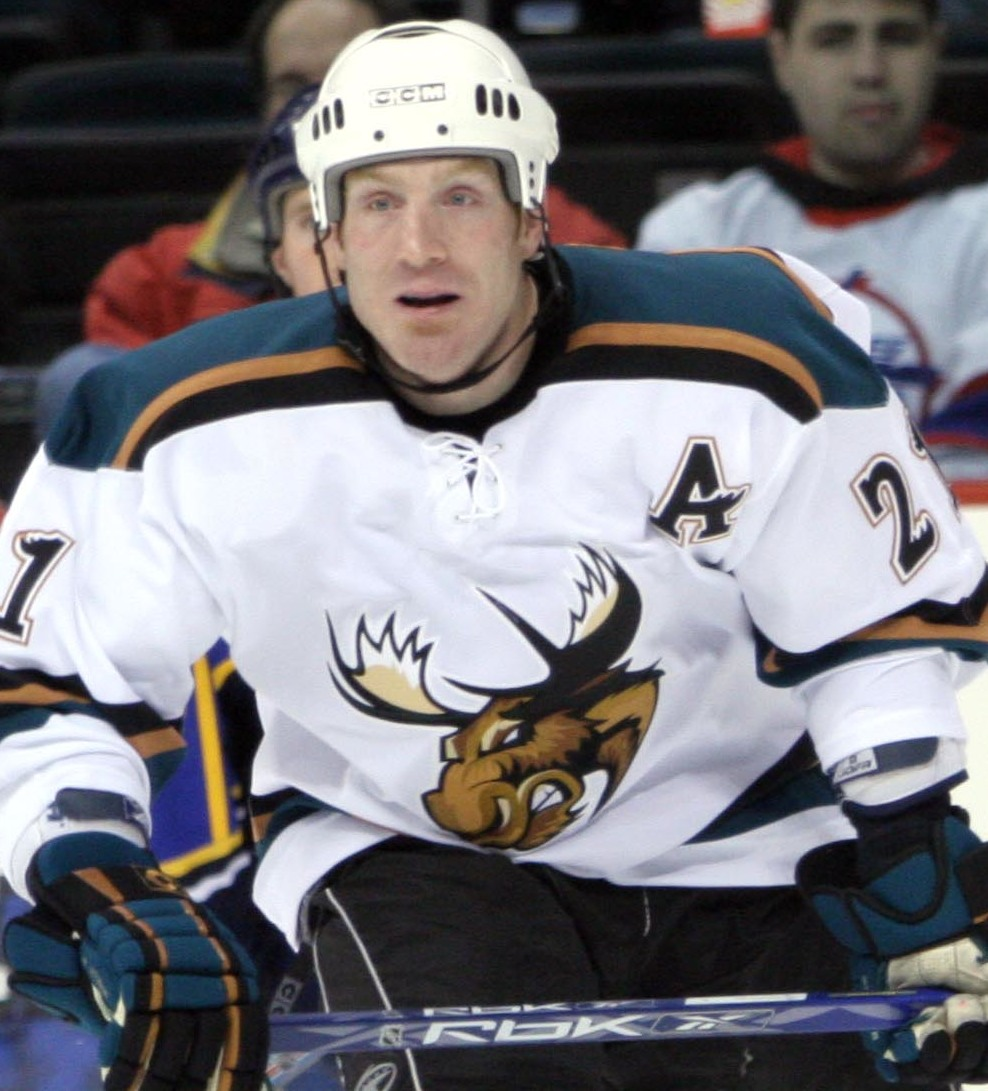
Roy with the Manitoba Moose in 2005

Roy was drafted 254th overall by the Dallas Stars in the 1994 NHL entry draft but never played in the National Hockey League. After spending two years at Michigan Technological University he signed with the Manitoba Moose in 1997. Roy spent nine seasons with the Manitoba Moose, the first four in the International Hockey League and the rest in the American Hockey League after the Moose became members of the league when the IHL folded. He held several team records including games played and most goals, and his number was retired by the team in February 2020. For the 2006–07 season Roy signed with the Iserlohn Roosters of the Deutsche Eishockey Liga.

In Iserlohn he developed to a key player, known for his leadership qualities on and off the ice. He also helped the club to sign some former Moose players like Ryan Ready and Pat Kavanagh. Roy extended his contract after his first season in Germany for two years. On Christmas Day 2008 the Roosters announced again that Roy had signed for two more years. As a Rooster he usually played on a line with Ryan Ready. In the 2007–08 season their center was Pat Kavanagh, the next season Bob Wren was their linemate. In 2011, he retired as a player to take the position of director of player development in the Winnipeg Jets organization.

== Career statistics ==
			Regular season					Playoffs
Season	Team	League	GP	G	A	Pts	PIM	GP	G	A	Pts	PIM
1993–94	Thunder Bay Flyers	USHL	46	21	33	54	101	—	—	—	—	—
1994–95	Michigan Tech	WCHA	38	5	11	16	62	—	—	—	—	—
1995–96	Michigan Tech	WCHA	42	17	17	34	84	—	—	—	—	—
1997–98	Manitoba Moose	IHL	61	8	10	18	133	3	0	0	0	6
1998–99	Manitoba Moose	IHL	78	10	16	26	185	5	0	1	1	6
1999–00	Manitoba Moose	IHL	74	12	9	21	187	1	0	0	0	16
2000–01	Manitoba Moose	IHL	77	18	13	31	150	12	1	1	2	22
2001–02	Manitoba Moose	AHL	73	16	22	38	167	7	2	0	2	28
2002–03	Manitoba Moose	AHL	50	5	10	15	95	14	4	4	8	27
2003–04	Manitoba Moose	AHL	78	13	16	29	186	—	—	—	—	—
2004–05	Manitoba Moose	AHL	50	10	7	17	187	13	2	1	3	34
2005–06	Manitoba Moose	AHL	62	9	8	17	144	4	0	0	0	9
2006–07	Iserlohn Roosters	DEL	48	8	14	22	118	—	—	—	—	—
2007–08	Iserlohn Roosters	DEL	51	15	17	32	155	7	3	3	6	18
2008–09	Iserlohn Roosters	DEL	50	17	15	32	80	—	—	—	—	—
2009–10	Iserlohn Roosters	DEL	43	10	13	23	84	—	—	—	—	—
2010–11	Iserlohn Roosters	DEL	44	17	13	30	80	—	—	—	—	—
IHL totals			290	48	48	96	655	21	1	2	3	50
AHL totals			313	53	63	116	779	38	8	5	13	98
DEL totals			236	67	72	139	517	7	3	3	6	18

== Awards ==
- 2002–03 Yanick Dupre Memorial Award
- 2006 AHL All-Star Game
