= Tyler Beechey =

Canadian ice hockey player

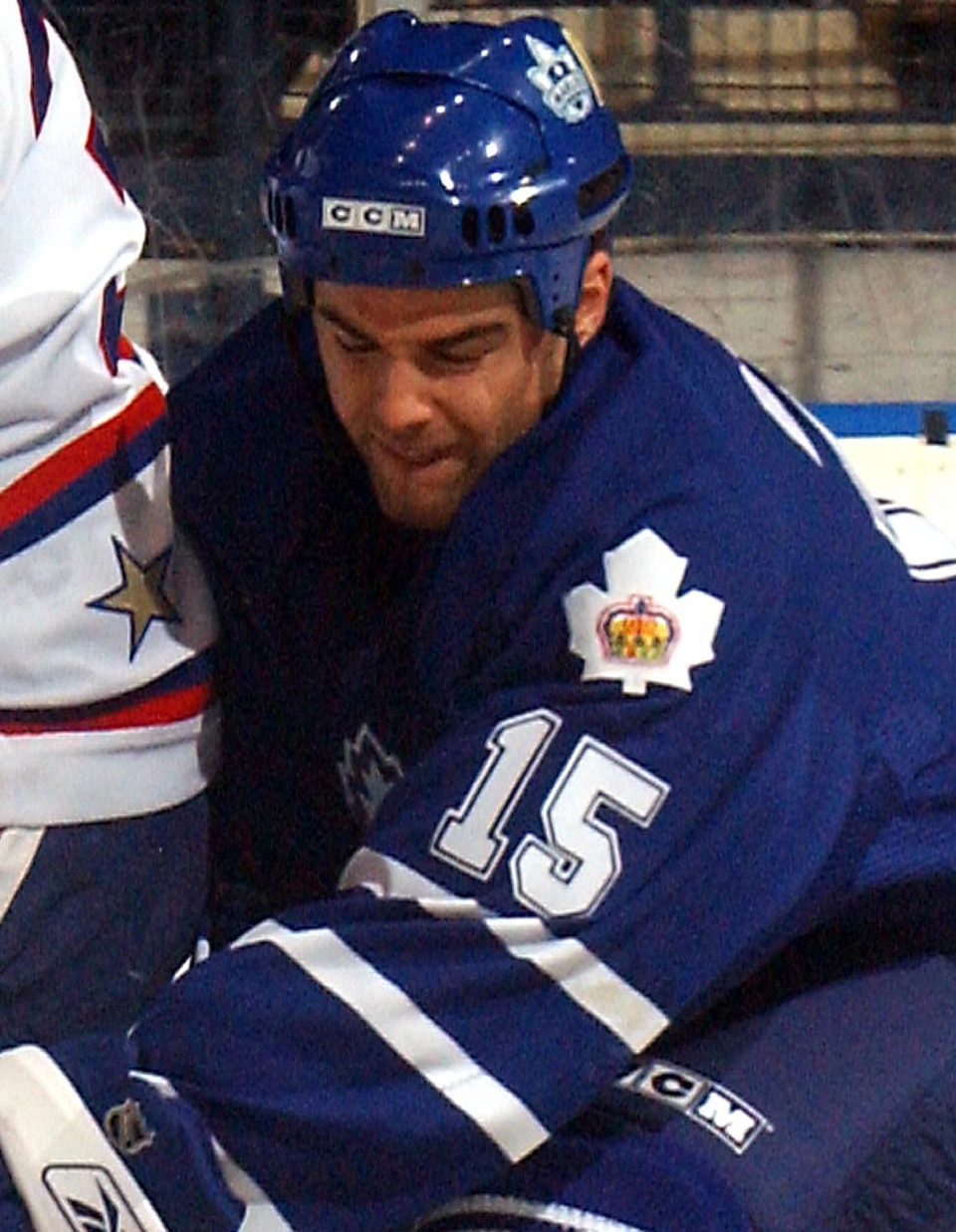
- Beechey with the Toronto Marlies in 2005
- Born: June 5, 1981 (age 44) Edmonton, Alberta, Canada
- Height: 5 ft 11 in (180 cm)
- Weight: 194 lb (88 kg; 13 st 12 lb)
- Position: Forward
- Shoots: Left
- ChHL team Former teams: Innisfail Eagles; Providence Bruins; St. John's Maple Leafs; Toronto Marlies; Manitoba Moose; Iserlohn Roosters; Augsburger Panther; DEG Metro Stars; Straubing Tigers; Schwenninger Wild Wings; Krefeld Pinguine
- Playing career: 2002–present

Tyler Beechey (born. June 5, 1981) is a Canadian former professional ice hockey forward who is currently playing with the Innisfail Eagles in the semi-professional Chinook Hockey League (ChHL).

Undrafted, Beechey has previously played for the Straubing Tigers after joining on June 29, 2012, from the DEG Metro Stars.

On July 31, 2013, Beechey agreed to a one-year contract with his fifth German club, the newly promoted Schwenninger Wild Wings. In the 2013–14 season, Beechey played amongst the top scoring line with the Wild Wings recording 37 points in 49 games.

On July 17, 2014, Beechey continued his journeyman career in Germany, agreeing to a two-year contract with the Krefeld Pinguine.

== Career statistics ==
			Regular season					Playoffs
Season	Team	League	GP	G	A	Pts	PIM	GP	G	A	Pts	PIM
1997–98	Edmonton Ice	WHL	7	1	0	1	2	—	—	—	—	—
1998–99	Kootenay Ice	WHL	57	14	9	23	24	5	4	3	7	2
1999–00	Kootenay Ice	WHL	58	12	28	40	23	21	5	9	14	10
2000–01	Kootenay Ice	WHL	70	32	40	72	72	11	1	3	4	6
2001–02	Kootenay Ice	WHL	3	0	2	2	13	—	—	—	—	—
2001–02	Calgary Hitmen	WHL	67	44	53	97	91	7	3	3	6	14
2002–03	Providence Bruins	AHL	3	2	1	3	2	—	—	—	—	—
2002–03	Trenton Titans	ECHL	51	8	38	46	33	3	2	0	2	0
2003–04	Pensacola Ice Pilots	ECHL	69	25	35	60	46	5	3	2	5	0
2004–05	Pensacola Ice Pilots	ECHL	54	27	39	66	52	—	—	—	—	—
2004–05	St. John's Maple Leafs	AHL	10	2	5	7	4	—	—	—	—	—
2005–06	Toronto Marlies	AHL	47	13	18	31	27	5	0	0	0	0
2006–07	Manitoba Moose	AHL	5	0	0	0	2	—	—	—	—	—
2006–07	EHC Visp	NLB	19	17	13	30	22	—	—	—	—	—
2007–08	Iserlohn Roosters	DEL	51	24	24	48	68	6	2	1	3	2
2008–09	Iserlohn Roosters	DEL	41	12	24	36	44	—	—	—	—	—
2009–10	Augsburger Panther	DEL	56	24	33	57	44	14	5	9	14	18
2010–11	DEG Metro Stars	DEL	51	20	26	46	73	9	1	4	5	18
2011–12	DEG Metro Stars	DEL	52	15	18	33	63	7	4	6	10	6
2012–13	Straubing Tigers	DEL	34	14	16	30	24	7	2	4	6	0
2013–14	Schwenninger Wild Wings	DEL	49	12	25	37	65	—	—	—	—	—
2014–15	Krefeld Pinguine	DEL	42	7	14	21	46	3	0	0	0	0
2015–16	Innisfail Eagles	ChHL	6	2	1	3	0	6	2	5	7	0
2016–17	Innisfail Eagles	ChHL	15	9	10	19	34	6	5	3	8	14
2017–18	Innisfail Eagles	ACH	18	3	8	11	19	—	—	—	—	—
DEL totals			376	128	180	308	427	46	14	24	38	44

== Awards and honors ==
Award	Year
WHL
East First All-Star Team	2002
