= Ryan Ready =

Canadian ice hockey player

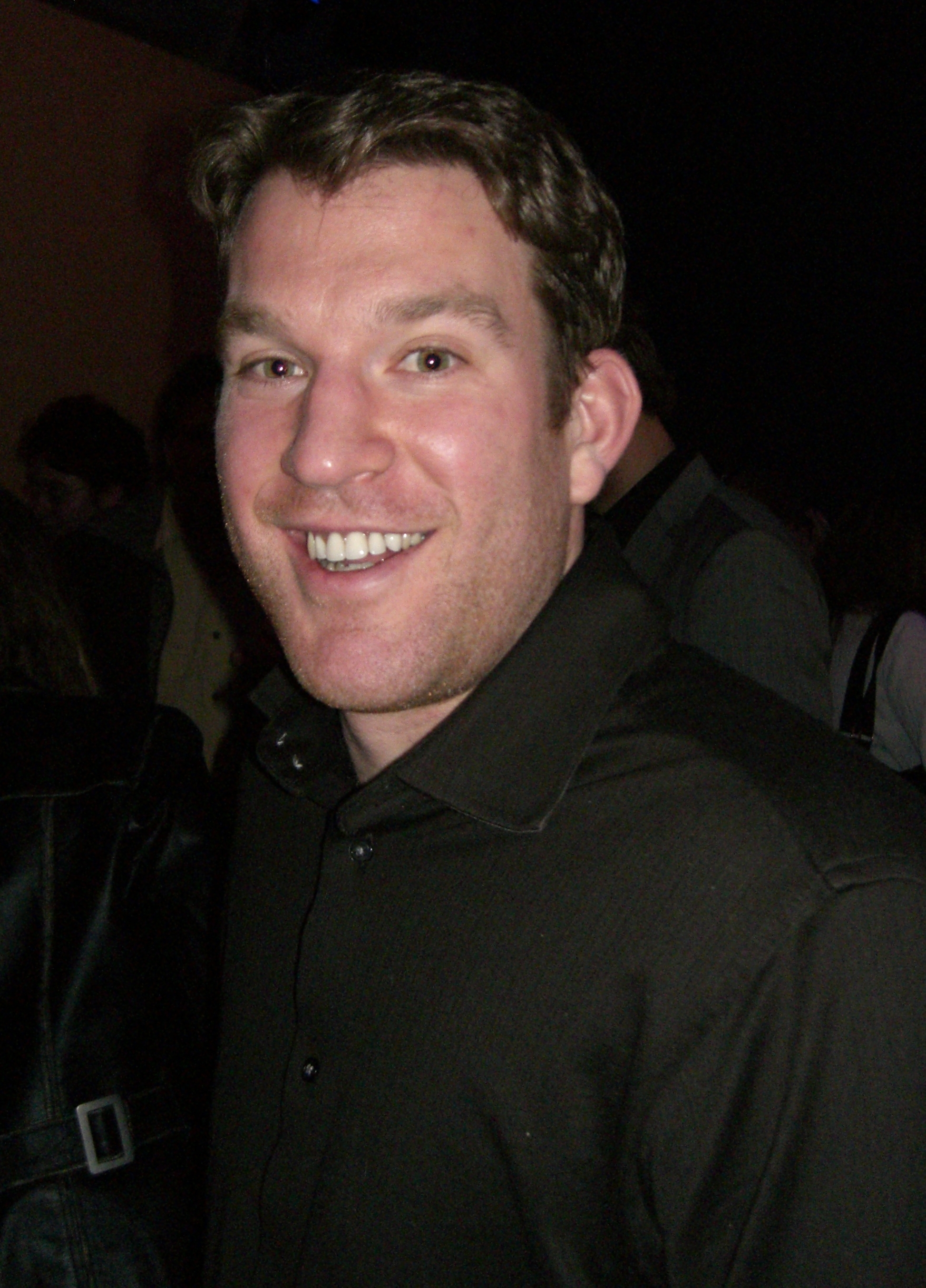
- Born: November 7, 1978 (age 47) Peterborough, Ontario, Canada
- Height: 6 ft 0 in (183 cm)
- Weight: 196 lb (89 kg; 14 st 0 lb)
- Position: Left wing
- Shot: Left
- Played for: Philadelphia Flyers; Iserlohn Roosters; EHC München
- NHL draft: 100th overall, 1997; Calgary Flames
- Playing career: 1999–2011

Ryan Ready (born November 7, 1978) is a Canadian former professional ice hockey left winger who played in the National Hockey League with the Philadelphia Flyers.

== Playing career ==
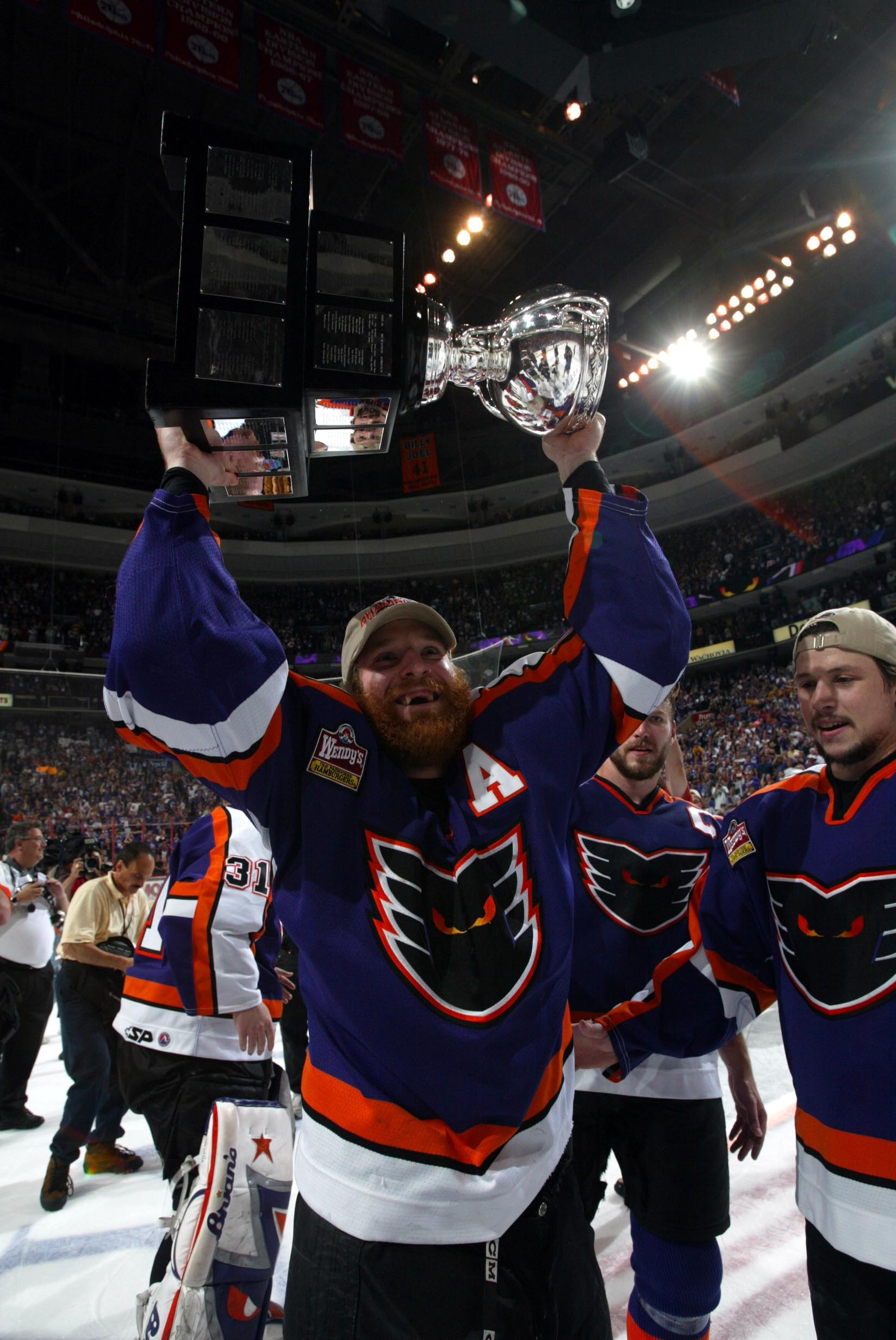
Ready holding the Calder Cup in 2005

Ready was drafted 100th overall in the 1997 NHL entry draft by the Calgary Flames. After playing his first seven NHL games with the Philadelphia Flyers in 2005–06, Ready signed with the Iserlohn Roosters of the DEL on September 15, 2006.

After four seasons with the Roosters, He signed a one-year contract with EHC München on July 16, 2010. In the 2010–11 season, Ready posted 44 points in 43 games with München before succumbing to injury to again miss out on the playoffs. On February 27, 2011, Ready signed a one-year extension to remain in Munich. However prior to the start of the 2011-12 season on August 8, 2011, Ready remained in Canada and unexpectedly announced his retirement from professional hockey.

== Career statistics ==
=== Regular season and playoffs ===
			Regular season					Playoffs
Season	Team	League	GP	G	A	Pts	PIM	GP	G	A	Pts	PIM
1994–95	Peterborough Bees	OPJHL	48	20	33	53	65	—	—	—	—	—
1995–96	Belleville Bulls	OHL	63	5	13	18	54	10	0	2	2	2
1996–97	Belleville Bulls	OHL	66	23	24	47	102	6	1	3	4	4
1997–98	Belleville Bulls	OHL	66	33	39	72	80	10	5	2	7	12
1998–99	Belleville Bulls	OHL	63	33	59	92	73	21	10	28	38	22
1999–2000	Syracuse Crunch	AHL	70	4	12	16	59	2	0	0	0	0
2000–01	Kansas City Blades	IHL	67	10	15	25	75	—	—	—	—	—
2001–02	Manitoba Moose	AHL	72	23	32	55	73	7	5	1	6	4
2002–03	Manitoba Moose	AHL	68	24	26	50	52	14	2	5	7	2
2003–04	Manitoba Moose	AHL	64	7	18	25	55	—	—	—	—	—
2003–04	Worcester IceCats	AHL	16	2	5	7	10	10	1	2	3	10
2004–05	Philadelphia Phantoms	AHL	72	7	18	25	104	19	2	11	13	6
2005–06	Philadelphia Phantoms	AHL	40	7	10	17	67	—	—	—	—	—
2005–06	Philadelphia Flyers	NHL	7	0	1	1	0	—	—	—	—	—
2006–07	Iserlohn Roosters	DEL	47	9	15	24	74	—	—	—	—	—
2007–08	Iserlohn Roosters	DEL	51	18	29	47	131	7	2	6	8	6
2008–09	Iserlohn Roosters	DEL	48	19	37	56	83	—	—	—	—	—
2009–10	Iserlohn Roosters	DEL	56	8	27	35	52	—	—	—	—	—
2010–11	EHC München	DEL	43	9	35	44	86	—	—	—	—	—
AHL totals			402	74	121	195	420	52	10	19	29	22
NHL totals			7	0	1	1	0	—	—	—	—	—
DEL totals			245	63	143	206	426	7	2	6	8	6

== Awards ==
- 1998–99: First All-Star Team (OHL)
- 1998–99: Leo Lalonde Memorial Trophy Overage Player of the Year (OHL)
- 1998–99: Second All-Star Team (CHL)
- 2004–05: Calder Cup Philadelphia Phantoms
