= Pat Kavanagh (ice hockey) =

Canadian ice hockey player (born 1979)

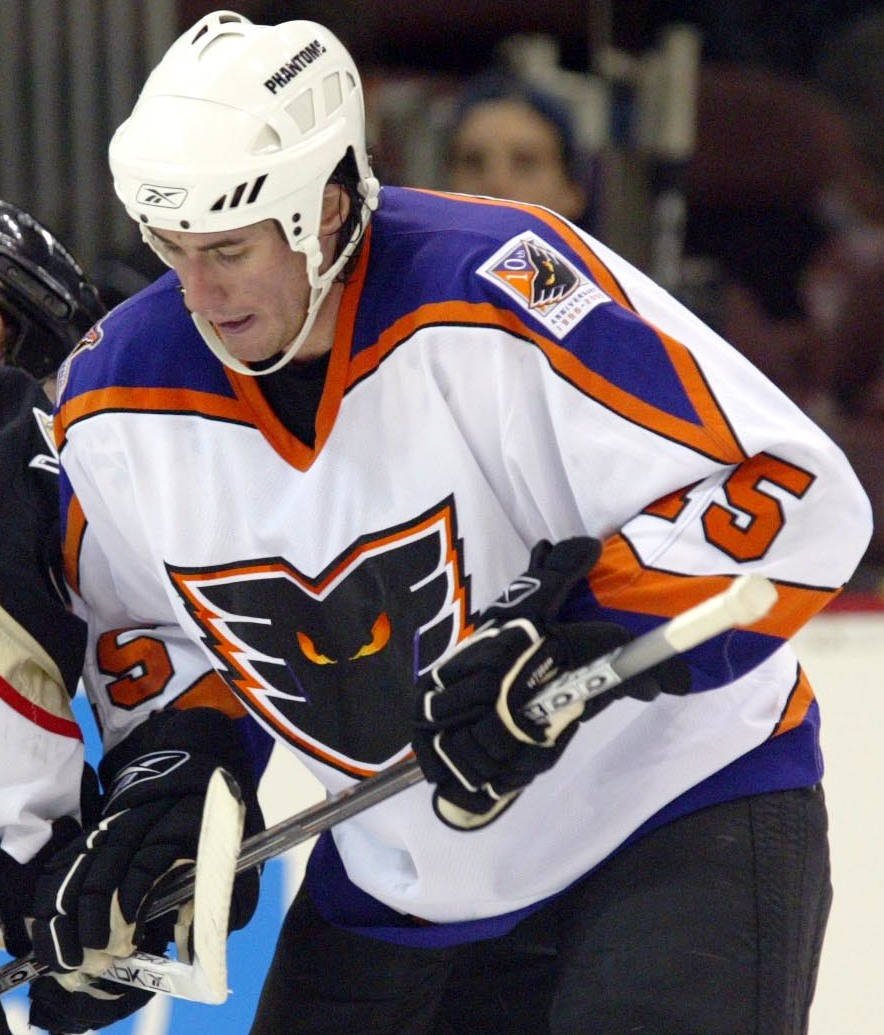
- Kavanagh with the Philadelphia Phantoms in 2005
- Born: March 14, 1979 (age 47) Ottawa, Ontario, Canada
- Height: 6 ft 3 in (191 cm)
- Weight: 195 lb (88 kg; 13 st 13 lb)
- Position: Right wing
- Shot: Right
- Played for: Vancouver Canucks; Philadelphia Flyers; SaiPa; HV71
- NHL draft: 50th overall, 1997; Philadelphia Flyers
- Playing career: 1999–2014

Pat Kavanagh (born March 14, 1979) is a Canadian former professional ice hockey right winger who played in the National Hockey League (NHL) for the Vancouver Canucks and Philadelphia Flyers.

== Playing career ==
Kavanagh was drafted in the 2nd round, 50th overall, by the Philadelphia Flyers in the 1997 NHL entry draft.

On January 31, 2007, Kavanagh signed with the HV71 of the Elitserien for the rest of the 2006–07 season after having played the early part of the season for SaiPa of the SM-liiga and two games with the Portland Pirates of the AHL. Kavanagh played for the Iserlohn Roosters in 2007–08 and after a good season he moved on to the Frankfurt Lions. He spent only a season there before moving to ERC Ingolstadt.

In the 2010–11 season, Kavanagh returned to sign a one-year contract with Iserlohn on July 9, 2010.

On June 21, 2011, Kavanagh switched European leagues, signing a one-year contract with the Vienna Capitals of the EBEL.

== Career statistics ==
| | | | Regular season | | | | | Playoffs |
| Season | Team | League | GP | G | A | Pts | PIM | GP | G | A | Pts | PIM |
|---|---|---|---|---|---|---|---|---|---|---|---|---|
| 1996–97 | Peterborough Petes | OHL | 43 | 6 | 8 | 14 | 53 | 11 | 1 | 1 | 2 | 12 |
| 1997–98 | Peterborough Petes | OHL | 66 | 10 | 16 | 26 | 90 | 4 | 1 | 0 | 1 | 6 |
| 1998–99 | Peterborough Petes | OHL | 68 | 26 | 43 | 69 | 118 | 5 | 0 | 5 | 5 | 10 |
| 1999–00 | Syracuse Crunch | AHL | 68 | 12 | 8 | 20 | 56 | 4 | 0 | 0 | 0 | 0 |
| 2000–01 | Kansas City Blades | IHL | 78 | 26 | 15 | 41 | 86 | — | — | — | — | — |
| 2000–01 | Vancouver Canucks | NHL | — | — | — | — | — | 3 | 0 | 0 | 0 | 2 |
| 2001–02 | Manitoba Moose | AHL | 70 | 13 | 19 | 32 | 100 | 7 | 1 | 0 | 1 | 6 |
| 2002–03 | Manitoba Moose | AHL | 63 | 15 | 15 | 30 | 96 | 14 | 7 | 4 | 11 | 20 |
| 2002–03 | Vancouver Canucks | NHL | 3 | 1 | 0 | 1 | 2 | — | — | — | — | — |
| 2003–04 | Manitoba Moose | AHL | 73 | 23 | 22 | 45 | 69 | — | — | — | — | — |
| 2003–04 | Vancouver Canucks | NHL | 3 | 1 | 0 | 1 | 0 | — | — | — | — | — |
| 2004–05 | Binghamton Senators | AHL | 80 | 14 | 17 | 31 | 87 | 6 | 0 | 1 | 1 | 10 |
| 2005–06 | Philadelphia Phantoms | AHL | 73 | 20 | 23 | 43 | 81 | — | — | — | — | — |
| 2005–06 | Philadelphia Flyers | NHL | 8 | 0 | 0 | 0 | 2 | — | — | — | — | — |
| 2006–07 | Portland Pirates | AHL | 2 | 0 | 0 | 0 | 4 | — | — | — | — | — |
| 2006–07 | SaiPa | SM-l | 22 | 3 | 5 | 8 | 24 | — | — | — | — | — |
| 2006–07 | HV71 | SEL | 10 | 1 | 2 | 3 | 6 | 14 | 1 | 1 | 2 | 62 |
| 2007–08 | Iserlohn Roosters | DEL | 54 | 25 | 25 | 50 | 156 | 6 | 2 | 3 | 5 | 40 |
| 2008–09 | Frankfurt Lions | DEL | 49 | 15 | 25 | 40 | 96 | 5 | 3 | 2 | 5 | 6 |
| 2009–10 | ERC Ingolstadt | DEL | 55 | 17 | 32 | 49 | 97 | 10 | 1 | 2 | 3 | 10 |
| 2010–11 | Iserlohn Roosters | DEL | 52 | 15 | 27 | 42 | 62 | — | — | — | — | — |
| 2011–12 | Vienna Capitals | EBEL | 25 | 4 | 6 | 10 | 41 | — | — | — | — | — |
| 2012–13 | HC Pustertal Wölfe | Serie A | 41 | 14 | 23 | 37 | 96 | 2 | 0 | 0 | 0 | 0 |
| 2013–14 | Cornwall River Kings | LNAH | 15 | 2 | 7 | 9 | 20 | — | — | — | — | — |
| NHL totals | | | 14 | 2 | 0 | 2 | 4 | 3 | 0 | 0 | 0 | 2 |
