= Hamburg Freezers =

- Nickname: Iceboxes
- City: Hamburg, Germany
- League: Deutsche Eishockey Liga
- Founded: 1999
- Folded: 2016
- Home arena: Barclaycard Arena Hamburg (capacity: 13,000)
- Colours: Light blue, navy, white, gray
- Owner(s): Anschutz Entertainment Group
- Captain: Christoph Schubert
- Website: hamburg-freezers.de

Franchise history
- 1999–2002: Munich Barons
- 2002–2016: Hamburg Freezers

The Hamburg Freezers were a professional men's ice hockey club from Hamburg, Germany that played in the Deutsche Eishockey Liga. The club announced its withdrawal from the DEL and ceased operations on 24 May 2016 when Anschutz Entertainment Group, which owned both the Freezers and Eisbären Berlin, felt it was no longer financially viable to own two teams within the same hockey league.

The Freezers were originally known as the Munich Barons from 1999 until 3 June 2002, when team owner Philip Anschutz relocated to Hamburg for financial reasons. The club was renamed the Hamburg Freezers. Their German nickname was Eisschränke (iceboxes).

The team's official colours were crystal blue and white and they played their home games in the Barclaycard Arena Hamburg.

Goaltender Jean-Sébastien Giguère suited up for the Freezers during the 2004–05 NHL lockout season. Giguère played six games for Hamburg and posted a .925 save percentage, with a goals against average of 2.39.

During the 2012–13 NHL lockout, Dallas Stars forward Jamie Benn lined up for the Freezers in 19 games, amassing 7 goals and 13 assists, earning him a player of the month award for November.

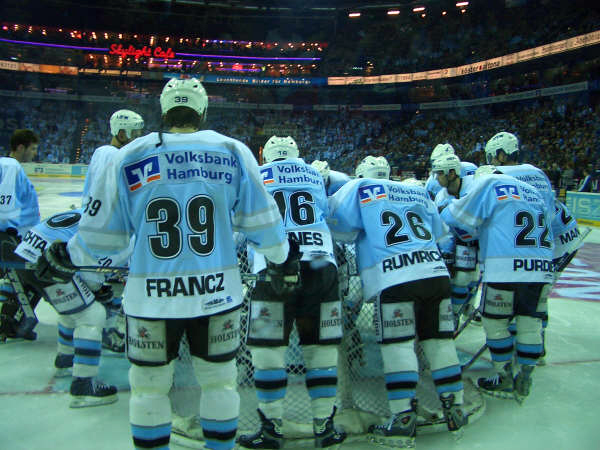
Freezers during a match in 2006.

== History ==
The Hamburg Freezers were founded in 2002, when the Munich Barons franchise was moved to Hamburg in northern Germany due to low turnouts and resulting financial problems. The Barons had an average turnout of under 3,000 spectators in Germany's second largest city despite being crowned league champions in 2000 while Hamburg had no representation in the country's top league and was therefore chosen as the next destination for the franchise.

In their first season, the average attendance exceeded 5,000. The team finished in 8th place, making it through to the quarter finals of the playoffs.

In the next 10 years, attendance grew until the average attendance in 2011–12 was over 9,200. In its final season, 2015–16, the attendance was fourth highest in Germany and tenth-best in Europe. The club was a perennial playoff team although it never won a DEL championship.

In May 2016, team owner Philip Anschutz announced that the team would no longer be sponsored by his company, Anschutz Entertainment Group. The Freezers were given a deadline of 24 May 2016 to find a buyer and new sponsorship, which was unable to be met, ceasing the operations of the club.

=== Rivals ===
Most of the DEL teams are based in the south and south west of the country, meaning there were very few local rivals for Hamburg. However, the Freezers did enjoy 'northern derbies' against two other franchises; Grizzly Adams Wolfsburg and Hannover Scorpions, while the team's main rivals were Eisbären Berlin, who are also owned by Philip Anschultz.

=== Mascot ===
The Hamburg Freezers mascot was Stanley the Lion, 'cousin' of Bailey the Lion of the Los Angeles Kings, another club owned by Anschutz Entertainment Group.

== Season records ==
Season	Games	Won	Lost	Tie	OTL	SOL	Points	Goals for	Goals against	Rank	Playoffs
2002–03	52	27	19	6	0	-	77	154	152	8	Lost in Quarterfinals
2003–04	52	32	17	0	3	-	95	151	115	3	Lost in Semifinals
2004–05	52	26	24	0	2	-	76	133	148	8	Lost in Quarterfinals
2005–06	52	29	17	-	0	6	85	144	145	6	Lost in Quarterfinals
2006–07	52	32	19	-	1	2	83	169	153	7	Lost in Quarterfinals
2007–08	56	28	20	-	1	7	87	194	171	7	Lost in Quarterfinals
2008–09	52	27	19	-	2	4	82	158	147	8	Lost in Quarterfinals
2009–10	56	20	31	-	4	1	61	162	200	14	Did not qualify
2010–11	52	23	21	-	3	5	69	135	161	11	Did not qualify
2011–12	52	28	24	-	3	2	83	149	149	5	Lost in Quarterfinals
2012–13	52	24	18	-	3	4	85	158	130	5	Lost in Quarterfinals
2013–14	52	30	13	-	5	1	102	162	116	1	Lost in Semifinals
2014–15	52	28	17	-	3	4	90	161	154	4	Lost in Quarterfinals
2015–16	52	18	22	-	3	3	72	142	166	11	Did not qualify
