= Iserlohn Roosters =

- City: Iserlohn, Germany
- League: Deutsche Eishockey Liga
- Founded: 28 February 1959; 67 years ago
- Home arena: Balver-Zinn Arena (capacity: 4,967)
- Colors: Blue, black, white
- General manager: Christian Hommel
- Head coach: Doug Shedden
- Captain: Hubert Labrie
- Website: iserlohn-roosters.de

Franchise history
- 1959–1980: EC Deilinghofen
- 1980–1987: ECD Iserlohn
- 1988–1994: ECD Sauerland
- 1994: ECD Sauerland Iserlohn Penguins
- 1994–2000: Iserlohner EC
- 2000–present: Iserlohn Roosters

The Iserlohn Roosters are a professional ice hockey team based in Iserlohn, North Rhine-Westphalia. They are members of the Deutsche Eishockey Liga (DEL) since 2000 and play their home games at the Balver-Zinn Arena which is also known as Eissporthalle am Seilersee. The team made the playoffs three times in its first 15 seasons in the DEL. The Roosters are widely regarded for their fans and having one of the best atmospheres at home games in Europe despite having an arena capacity for just 4,967 spectators. The club caused much controversy in 1987 when, under Heinz Weifenbach, a US$900,000 advertising deal was signed for former Libyan leader Muammar Gaddafi's The Green Book.

== History ==
The history of ice hockey in Iserlohn began in the neighbouring town of Hemer. Canadian soldiers were deployed to a district of Hemer called Deilinghofen. They came to the town after the end of the Korean War in 1953 and soon built an arena – first without a roof. The teenagers in Deilinghofen were interested in this strange kind of sport and wanted to play it, too. They played on streets or frozen ponds, and were allowed to play in the arena in 1957 for the first time. Recognizing the joy of the teenagers, the Canadians found some coaches, with Charles McCuaig later becoming a regular trainer. After a long period of preparation, the first game against a Canadian youth team from Soest was on 8 March 1958 in front of 120 people. Deilinghofen played well, but lost 2–6. The equipment was borrowed from the soldiers. After that game, matches were more regular and attracted more fans, so a roof was built on the arena in 1958.

=== EC Deilinghofen (1959–1980) ===
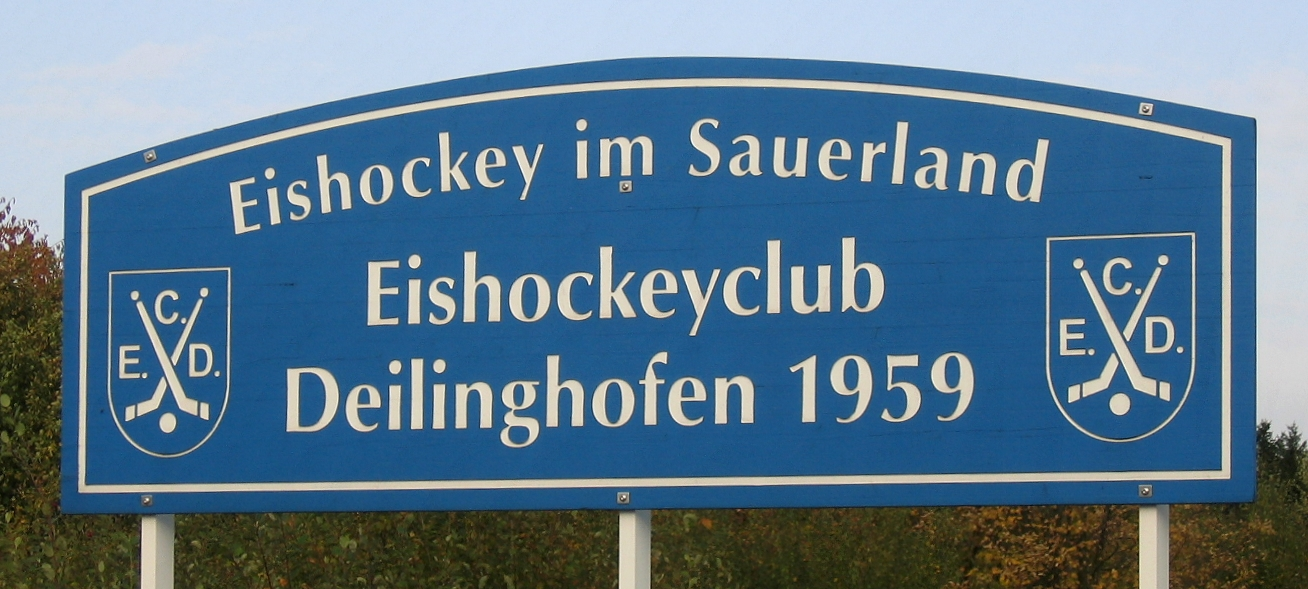

On 28 February 1959 EC Deilinghofen was founded. In 1959 a team from Deilinghofen started in a junior league and reached second place. A year later they took part in the German championship and finished fifth. In the second season, 1960–61, they came in first in North Rhine-Westphalia and were the second best team in the country. Between 1962 and 1964, they were champions of the north of Germany, but they lost the playoffs against the champions of the south. As a result, they missed promotion, although they were eventually promoted.

In 1971 the Canadian soldiers were sent home, and the incoming British soldiers were not interested in ice hockey. The team had to search for a new home. Local politicians wanted to have an arena in Iserlohn. With the agreement of Iserlohn's town council, the Eissporthalle am Seilersee was built.

In the 1976–77 season, Deilinghofen finished two places behind Kaufbeuren in the new Zweite Bundesliga. However, Kaufbeuren waived their right to promotion, and Deilinghofen received the chance to play in Germany's top hockey league for the first time.

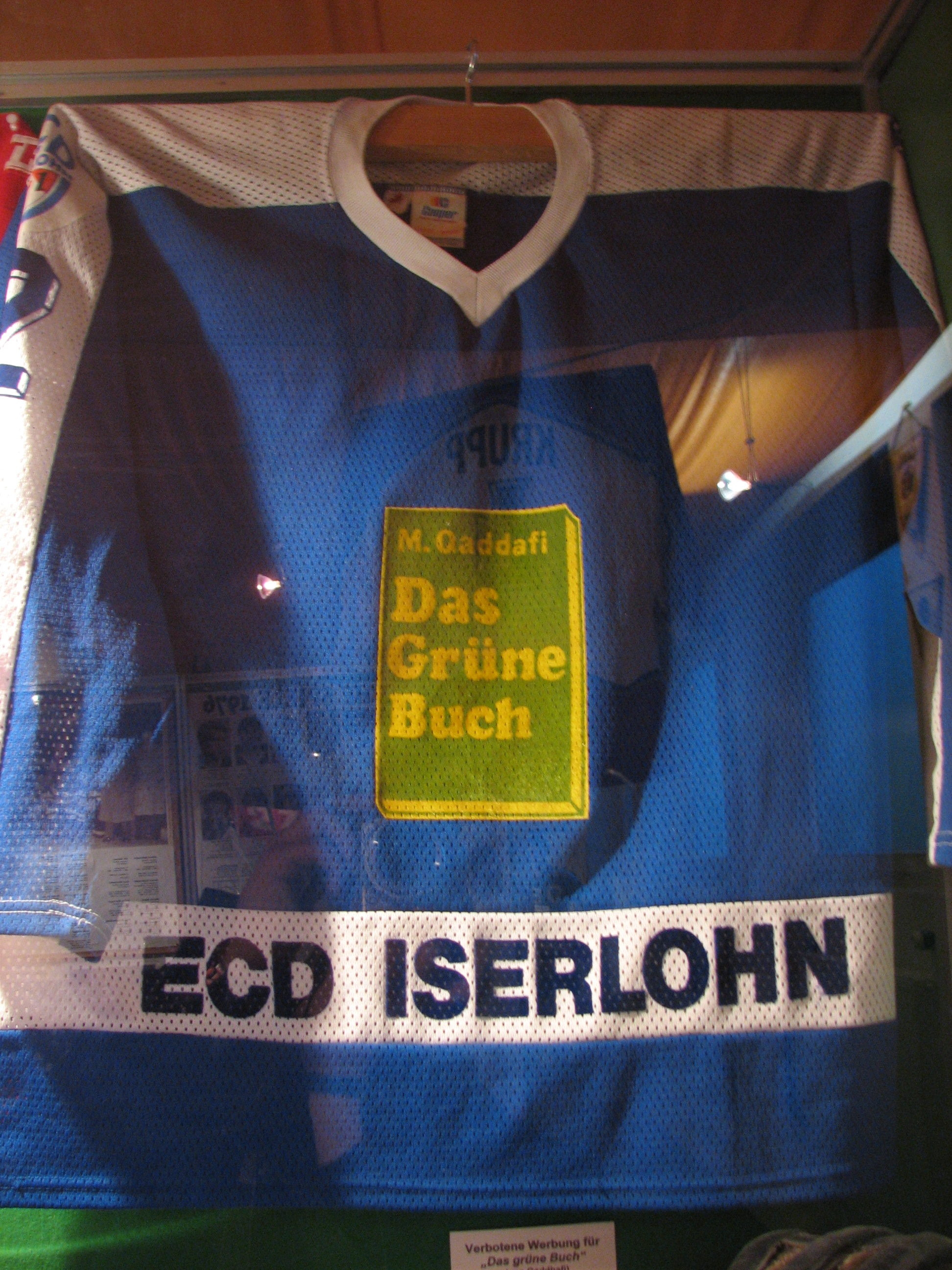
The 1987 ECD Iserlohn shirt with Gaddafi's Green Book advertisement

=== ECD Iserlohn (1980–1987) ===
In 1980 the club was renamed ECD Iserlohn because of its long history being based there. In the following season, the team was relegated for the first time in its history. Two years later, it moved back up again. The following years were the most successful seasons in the club's history. In 1986 ECD reached the semi-finals in the playoffs with stars like Jaroslav Pouzar and Martti Jarkko. Due to the added expenses created by the addition of these star players, the team president, Heinz Weifenbach, looked for financial help in Libya, where Muammar al-Gaddafi agreed to pay if the team advertised his "Green Book". On 4 December 1987 they came to an agreement. However, due to negative attention, ECD scrapped that plan a few days later.

=== ECD Sauerland (1988–1994) ===
The next season, ECD Sauerland was founded. They started playing in the Oberliga, although Weifenbach wanted to begin play in the Bundesliga. The club had the same significant financial problems as its predecessors. The 1991–92 season was a catastrophe, so the fans were afraid that the team would not receive a license to continue operating. ECD eventually obtained a license, but went bankrupt a few days after the end of the 1993–94 season.

=== ECD Sauerland Iserlohn Penguins (1994) ===
One day later, on 9 April 1994, the ECD Sauerland Iserlohn Penguins were founded, but the peewee players didn't contract in, so the club's history was short-lived.

=== Iserlohner EC (1994–2000) ===
Iserlohner EC (IEC) was founded on 20 April in the same year. The new committee wanted to avoid financial difficulties. After one season, the team moved up to the second-tier league. The following two years were more difficult, but new players during this time helped revived the club. In 1997 a new coach, Greg Poss, came to Iserlohn. After three successful years, the club moved up again after purchasing the operating license of Starbulls Rosenheim. 40 years after the foundation of the original team, the arena in Deilinghofen was torn down in 1999, despite protests from many people in Deilinghofen.

=== Iserlohn Roosters (since 2000) ===
Iserlohner EC joined the Deutsche Eishockey Liga in 2000 and adopted the name Iserlohn Roosters. A GmbH, which serves to administer the finances and the business organisation, was created for the professional team. The GmbH was named the Iserlohn Roosters GmbH. All junior teams were still under the control of the IEC. The Roosters continually had the lowest budget of all DEL teams, and the media often referred to them as an underdog team. In their first two seasons, the Roosters placed 15th and 12th.

In the 2002–03 season, the team again missed the playoffs by falling just two points short even though they beat the German champion of the year, the Krefeld Pinguine, 8–1 on the last day of the season. Before the next season, Poss left the club and went on to coach the Nürnberg Ice Tigers. Iserlohn named Dave Whistle as new coach, but after only nine games, Doug Mason was his successor. During the lockout season in 2004–05, Mike York and John-Michael Liles came to Iserlohn and helped the team reach 11th place despite still having the smallest budget in the league. York signed with Iserlohn after his old college friend Bryan Adams, who was the captain of the Roosters, talked to him. Brian Gionta also signed, but left without having played due to his wife's pregnancy.

Twelve players left the club in the summer of 2005, but the Roosters were able to make some great moves on the transfer market with the biggest signings being former DEL top scorer Brad Purdie and former NHL player Mark Greig for two years. Nevertheless, they finished in just eleventh place despite having the best power play in the league. In March 2006, Mason left Iserlohn for Kölner Haie, and Geoff Ward came to Iserlohn to coach. After defeating the DEG Metro Stars 5–1 in the opening game of the season in 2006–07, the Roosters were in first place for one week for the first time in their history. After again finishing another season in eleventh place, Ward then left Iserlohn during the summer of 2007 to be an assistant coach for the Boston Bruins of the NHL.

For the 2007–08 season, Rick Adduono became the new coach of the Roosters. The Roosters improved the team by adding Norm Maracle and Bob Wren. After the fifth game, they were in a playoff position and were able to hold on to it the rest of the season. Improved offense was due to Robert Hock and Michael Wolf beginning to dominate the league as native players, breaking the historic dominance of North American players. Wolf was the top goal scorer, and Hock became league top point scorer. The third man in their line was either Tyler Beechey, who was first signed on a try-out contract, or Brad Tapper. The line with Jimmy Roy, Pat Kavanagh, and Ryan Ready also helped the unexpected trip to the playoffs. However, in the quarterfinals they were defeated by the Frankfurt Lions in game 7.

For the next season, the Roosters signed former New York Islanders coach Steve Stirling. The team failed to continue the success they had the year before, and Stirling was fired in February after the team fell out of playoff position. Over the summer many players voiced their critique of Stirling. Assistant coach Ulrich Liebsch became the new head coach, and many key players left the team. Due to the 2008 financial crisis, the Roosters announced that they would look for young, talented players instead of focusing on veterans for the 2009–10 season.

== Season records ==
Season	Games	Won	Lost	Tie	OTL	SOL	Points	Goals for	Goals against	Rank	Playoffs
DEL
2000–01	60	23	31	0	6	–	68	152	189	15	Did not qualify
2001–02	60	23	28	0	9	–	74	154	183	12	Did not qualify
2002–03	52	25	19	8	0	–	75	142	132	9	Did not qualify
2003–04	52	19	26	0	7	–	59	137	169	12	Did not qualify
2004–05	52	21	26	0	5	–	64	138	156	11	Did not qualify
2005–06	52	21	26	–	0	5	65	166	178	11	Did not qualify
2006–07	52	24	24	–	1	3	70	148	163	11	Did not qualify
2007–08	56	33	18	–	4	1	96	208	196	5	Lost in quarterfinals
2008–09	52	22	18	–	5	7	71	171	187	11	Did not qualify
2009–10	56	26	26	–	3	1	74	166	183	11	Did not qualify
2010–11	52	21	22	–	5	4	68	150	159	12	Did not qualify
2011–12	52	25	19	–	4	4	77	150	150	10	Lost in playoff qualifications
2012–13	52	20	29	–	2	1	59	130	167	13	Did not qualify
2013–14	52	19	22	–	2	3	74	147	149	10	Lost in quarterfinals
2014–15	52	28	17	–	4	3	86	179	150	6	Lost in quarterfinals
2015–16	52	23	12	–	6	6	91	162	143	3	Lost in quarterfinals
2016–17	52	17	27	–	6	2	55	129	171	13	Did not qualify
2017–18	52	27	24	–	1	0	76	138	154	8	Lost in playoff qualifications
2018–19	52	17	28	–	4	3	56	162	189	13	Did not qualify
2019–20	52	17	30	–	3	2	51	116	163	13	Cancelled due to the COVID-19 pandemic.
2020–21	37	18	12	–	5	2	56	113	116	7	Lost in quarterfinals
2021–22	54	22	24	–	7	1	67	159	177	12	Did not qualify
2022–23	56	24	26	–	6	2	73	149	192	13	Did not qualify
2023–24	52	13	27	–	6	6	57	125	183	13	Did not qualify
2024–25	52	17	27	–	5	3	53	140	180	12	Did not qualify
2025–26	52	20	28	–	2	2	58	131	167	12	Did not qualify

== Players ==
=== Current roster ===
Updated 11 April 2025.

No.	Nat	Player	Pos	S/G	Age	Acquired	Birthplace
63	(Germany)	Manuel Alberg	RW	R	25	2024	Cologne, Germany
10	(Canada)	Tyler Boland	C	R	29	2023	St. John's, Newfoundland and Labrador, Canada
22	(Germany)	John Broda	F	L	24	2021	Weißwasser, Germany
20	(Germany)	Maximilian Brunner	F	L	20	2024	Bogen, Germany
18	(Canada)	Eric Cornel	C	R	30	2021	Kemptville, Ontario, Canada
67	(Czech Republic)	Stanislav Dietz	D	L	35	2024	Písek, Czech Republic
32	(Germany)	Hendrik Hane	G	L	25	2024	Düsseldorf, Germany
55	(Germany)	Johannes Huß	D	L	27	2024	Bad Tölz, Germany
92	(Germany)	Andreas Jenike	G	L	37	2019	Hamburg, Germany
90	(Germany)	Taro Jentzsch	C	R	25	2023	Berlin, Germany
77	(Canada)	Colton Jobke	D	L	34	2024	Vancouver, British Columbia, Canada
75	(Germany)	Julian Napravnik	RW	L	28	2025	Bad Nauheim, Germany
–	(Germany)	Daniel Neumann	F	L	24	2025	Freiburg, Germany
24	(Germany)	Lennard Nieleck	C	R	22	2024	Witten, Germany
12	(Germany)	Maciej Rutkowski	C	L	23	2022	Sosnowiec, Poland
14	(Germany)	Noel Saffran	F	L	22	2024	Duisburg, Germany
27	(Canada)	Christian Thomas	RW	R	33	2025	Toronto, Ontario, Canada
79	(Germany)	Colin Ugbekile	D	L	26	2022	Solingen, Germany
3	(Canada)	Kyle Wood	D	R	29	2025	Waterloo, Ontario, Canada

== Individual team records ==
Current as of the end of the 2022–23 season.

Most games played
Rank	Player	Games
1.	Collin Danielsmeier	567
2.	Michael Wolf	459
3.	Christian Hommel	457
4.	Dieter Orendorz	410
5.	Robert Hock	368
6.	Marko Friedrich	288
7.	Mike York	287
8.	Dimitrij Kotschnew	259
9.	Jeff Giuliano	245
10.	Mark Ardelan	242

Most points
Rank	Player	Points
1.	Michael Wolf	447
2.	Robert Hock	390
3.	Mike York	278
4.	Ryan Ready	162
5.	Mark Ardelan	140
6.	Jimmy Roy	139
7.	Casey Bailey	124
8.	Ryan O'Connor	124
9.	Louie Caporusso	123
10.	Brent Raedeke	115

Most goals
Rank	Player	Goals
1.	Michael Wolf	230
2.	Robert Hock	109
3.	Mike York	93
4.	Jimmy Roy	67
5.	Louie Caporusso	55
6.	Casey Bailey	55
7.	Ryan Ready	54
8.	Brooks Macek	51
9.	Brent Raedeke	46
10.	Jason Jaspers	44

Most assists
Rank	Player	Assists
1.	Robert Hock	281
2.	Michael Wolf	217
3.	Mike York	185
4.	Ryan Ready	108
5.	Mark Ardelan	106
6.	Ryan O'Connor	96
7.	Bob Wren	76
7.	Jimmy Roy	72
8.	Jeff Giuliano	69
9.	Casey Bailey	69

Most penalties in minutes
Rank	Player	PIM
1.	Christian Hommel	736
2.	Jimmy Roy	517
3.	Michael Wolf	436
4.	Ryan Ready	340
5.	Tomas Martinec	327
6.	Colten Teubert	312
7.	Collin Danielsmeier	287
8.	Paul Traynor	282
9.	Marko Friedrich	255
10.	Robert Hock	252

Most shutouts
Rank	Player	SO
1.	Sebastien Caron	7
2.	Jimmy Waite	6
3.	Dimitrij Kotschnew	5
4.	Mathias Lange	5
5.	Norm Maracle	4
