= Balver-Zinn Arena =

Arena in Iserlohn, Germany

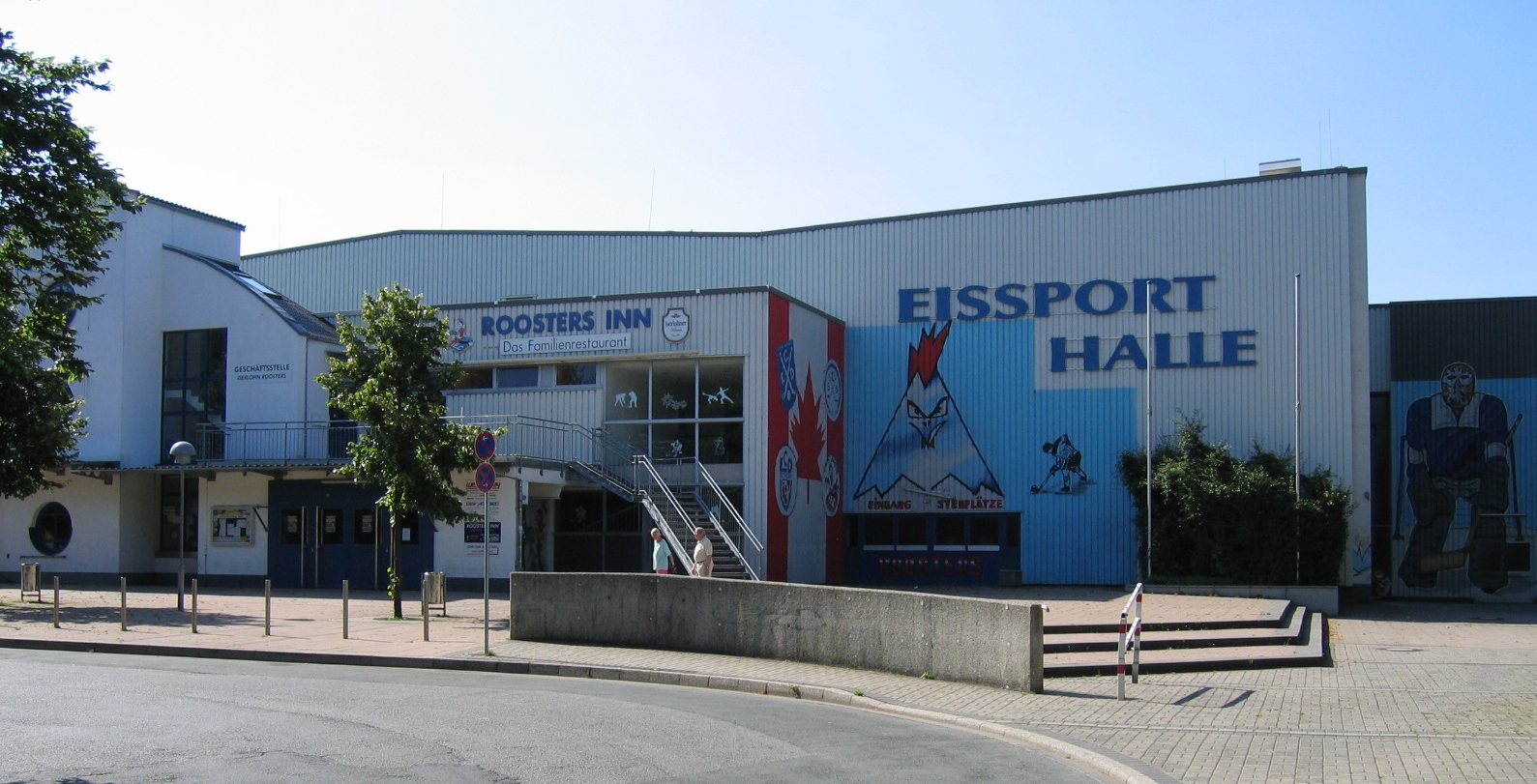
- The Arena
- Interactive map of Balver-Zinn Arena
- Address: Iserlohn; Germany
- Coordinates: 51°23′05″N 7°42′50″E

Construction
- Opened: 1971

Website
- www.eissporthalle-iserlohn.de

The Balver-Zinn Arena, formerly known as Eissporthalle Iserlohn, is an arena in Iserlohn, Germany. It is primarily used for ice hockey and is the home arena of The Iserlohn Roosters, but has also been used for handball and football. It opened in 1971 and holds 4,999 people.

== Gallery ==
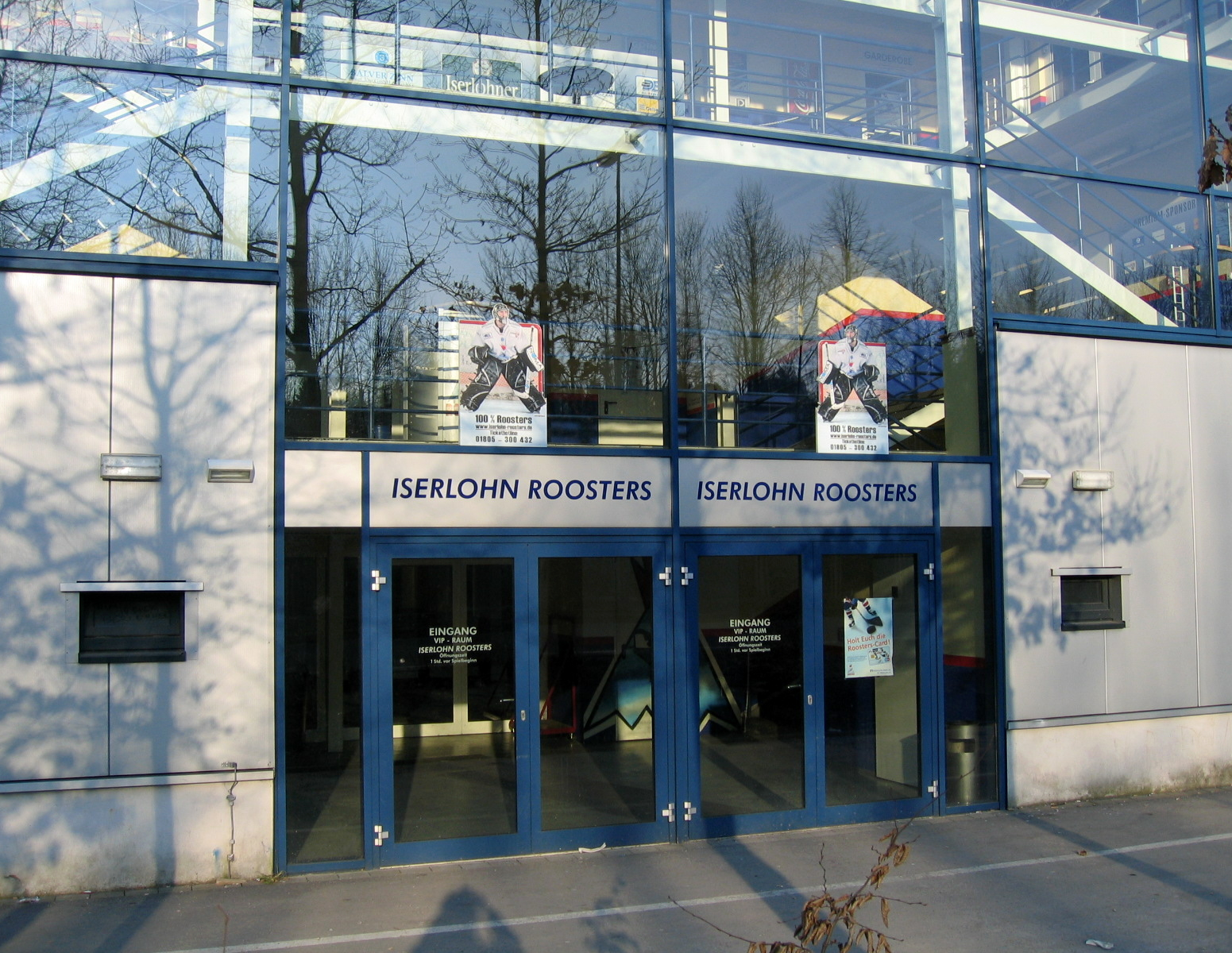
Entrance to the VIP area

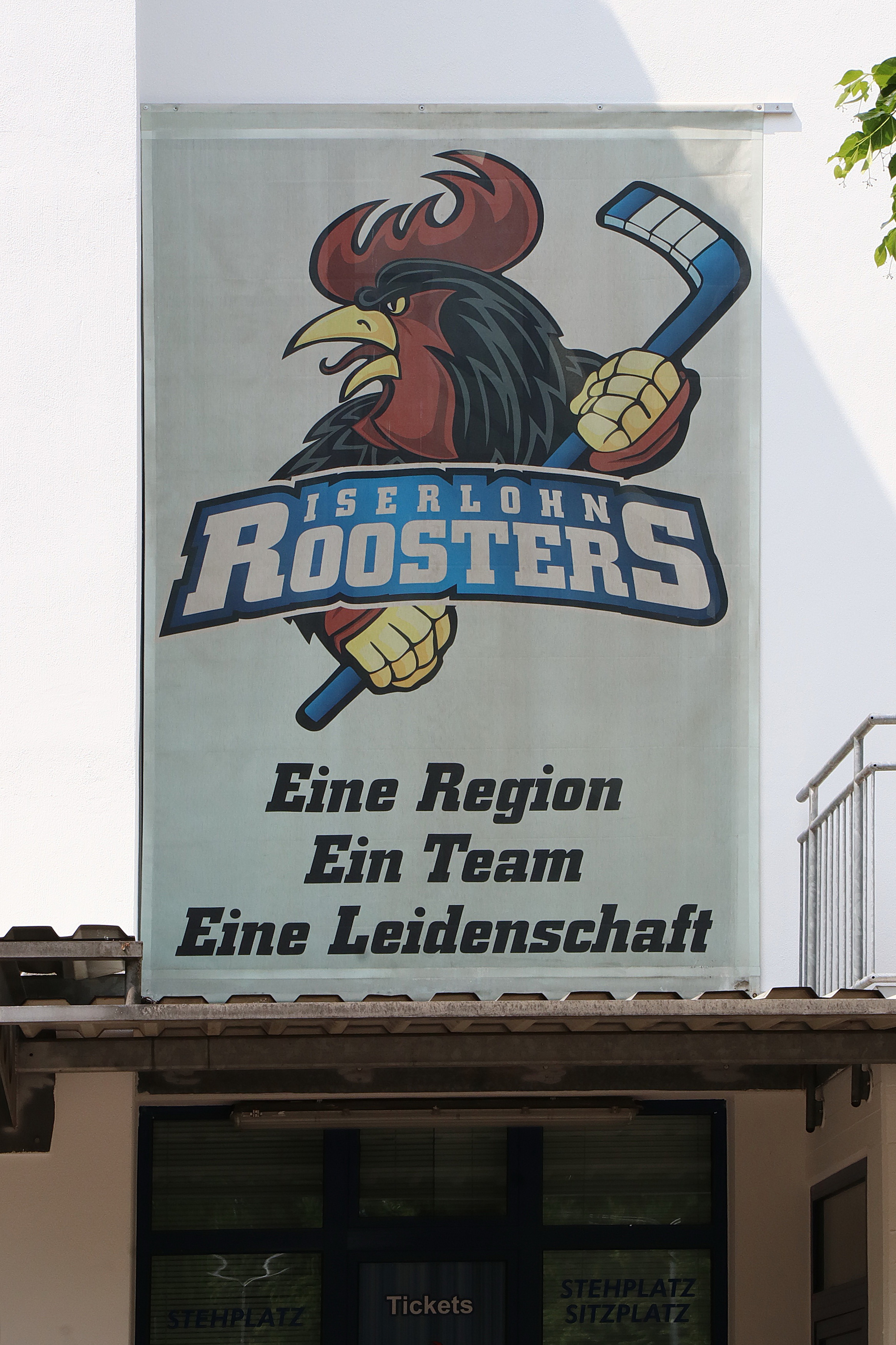
Banner above the ticket counter

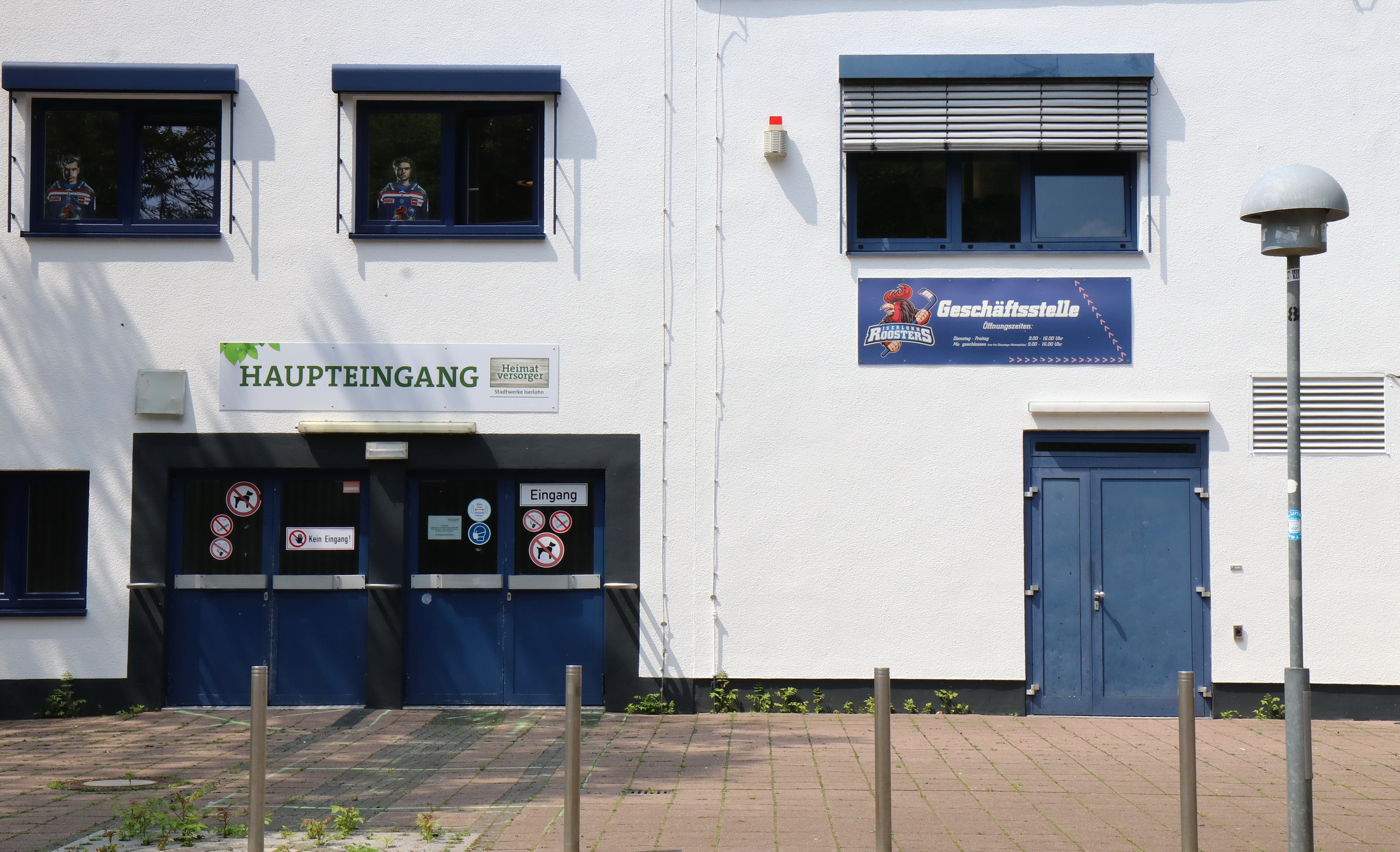
Main entrance

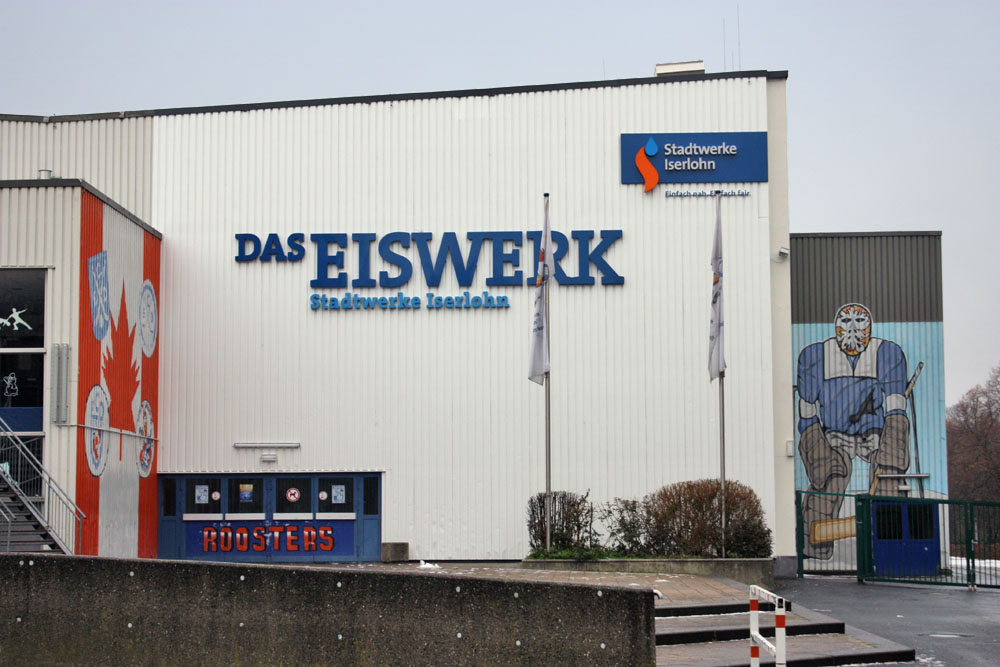
Facade detail

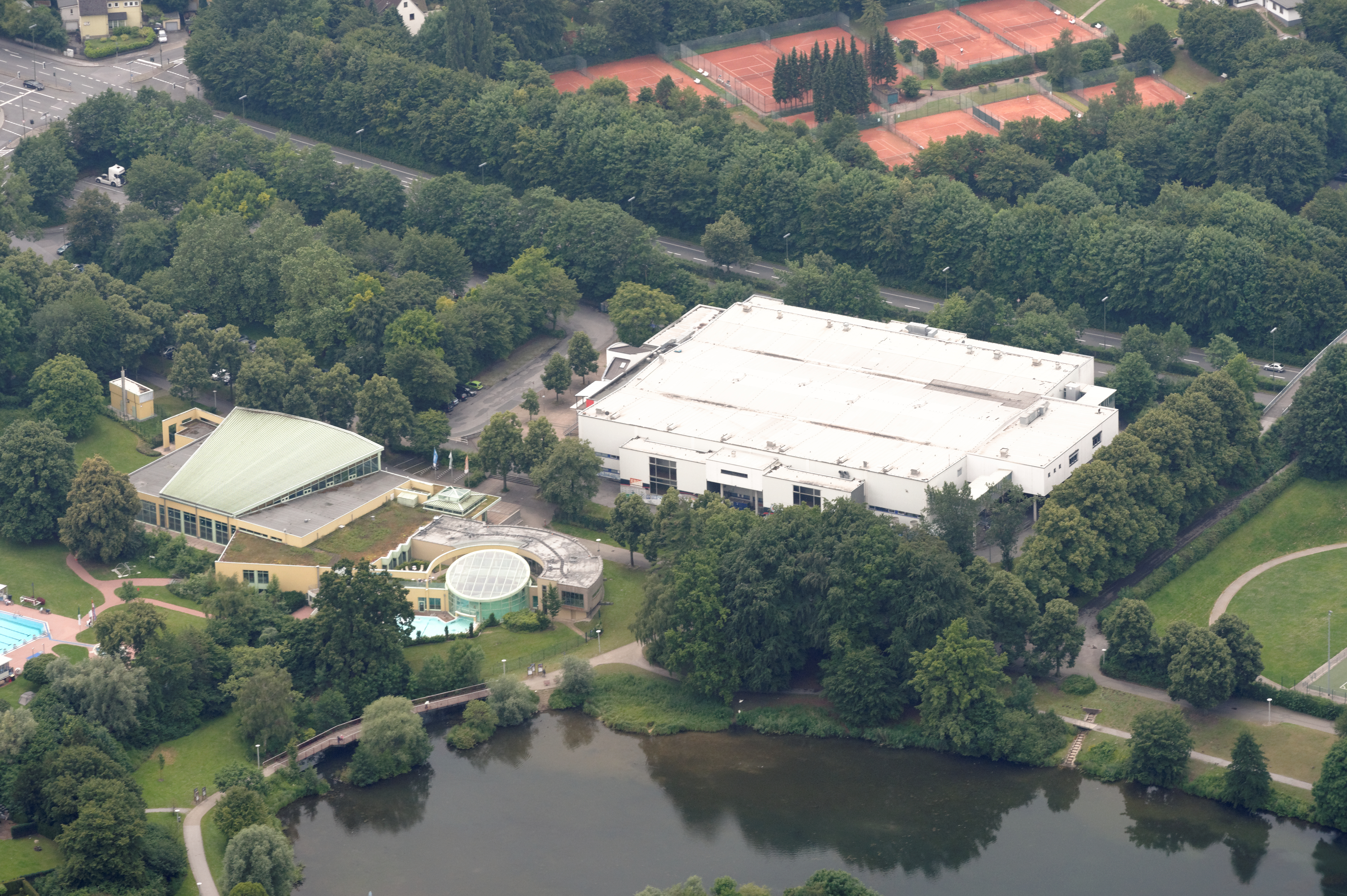
Aerial view
