= Hannover Scorpions =

- City: Hanover, Germany
- League: Oberliga
- Founded: 1975
- Home arena: ARS Arena Mellendorf
- Colors: Red, white, black
- Owner(s): Erich Haselbacher
- Head coach: Kevin Gaudet
- Website: HannoverScorpions.com

Franchise history
- 1975–1996: ESC Wedemark
- 1996–1997: Wedemark Scorpions
- 1997–present: Hannover Scorpions

The Hannover Scorpions are a professional ice hockey team, which plays in the Oberliga, Germany's third tier ice hockey league. They previously played in the Deutsche Eishockey Liga from 1996 to 2013.

== History ==
Founded in 1975, as ESC Wedemark, the team was renamed Wedemark Scorpions in their first DEL season in 1996 after the rock band Scorpions, who also call Hanover, Lower Saxony their home. The next season, the Scorpions relocated to Hanover proper and began playing their home games at TUI Arena in 2000.

Despite playing in the region's top venue, as well as enjoying sizeable corporate and political support, the team has struggled to generate sustained interest in Hanover.

Before relocating there in 1997, the Scorpions played their home games in Mellendorf, a small town located 20 km north in Wedemark township. They were actually considered rivals of Hanover. Thus, many local fans resented their longtime foe taking over the Hanover market at the expense of the city's historic hockey team, the less-favored Indians, and refused to support the Scorpions.

With the club stricken by financial problems at the conclusion of the 2012–13 season, the Scorpions were forced to sell their DEL license to 2nd Bundesliga club the SERC Wild Wings on 14 June 2013. The Scorpions were then placed in the Oberliga, Germany's third-tier league.

== Honors ==
=== Champions ===
- DEL championship (1): 2010
- Champion 1.League (1): 1996
- Oberliga Nord Champion (1): 1994
- Regionalliga Nord Champion (2): 1977, 1991

== Players ==
#	Nat	Player	Pos
30	(Germany)	Björn Linda	(G)
94	(Germany)	Lukas Müller	(G)
31	(Germany)	Simon Peddinghaus	(G)
11	(Canada) (Germany)	Sean Fischer	(D/F)
18	(Croatia) (Germany)	Goran Pantic	(D)
58	(Germany)	Dennis Schütt	(D)
91	(Germany)	Florian Spelleken	(D)
15	(Canada) (Germany)	Robin Thomson	(D)
9	(Germany)	Jörn Welkamp	(D)
96	(Germany)	Jannik Weist	(D)
36	(Germany)	Reiko Berblinger	(F/D)
52	(Kazakhstan) (Germany)	Sachar Blank	(LW)
11	(Germany)	Björn Bombis	(W/C)
82	(United States) (Canada)	Michael Budd	(F)
88	(Germany)	Noah Janisch	(F)
33	(Germany)	Christoph Koziol	(LW)
13	(Germany)	Sebastian Lehmann	(F)
72	(Germany)	Robin Marek	(F)
91	(Canada)	Chad Niddery	(LW/C)
23	(Germany)	Thomas Pape	(RW)
61	(Germany)	Robin Ringe	(F)
21	(Germany)	Patrick Schmid	(LW)
8	(Germany)	Delf Sinnecker	(F)

=== Honored members ===
- 10 (Canada) Joe West
- 20 (Germany) Len Soccio
- 85 (Russia) Arthur Jamaev

== Season records ==
Season	Games	Won	Lost	Tie	OTL	SOL	Points	Goals for	Goals against	Rank	Playoffs
1996–97	48	12	35	1	3	-	28	150	231	14	Saved in relegation
1997–98	44	22	14	6	2	-	52	160	142	7	Lost in quarterfinals
1998–99	52	18	25	3	6	-	66	175	195	11	No playoffs
1999–00	56	27	26	0	3	-	78	188	195	9	Saved in relegation
2000–01	60	32	22	0	6	-	99	203	182	7	Lost in semifinals
2001–02	60	25	28	0	7	-	78	180	201	10	No playoffs
2002–03	52	23	24	5	0	-	69	142	150	10	No playoffs
2003–04	52	15	32	0	5	-	48	127	175	13	Saved in relegation
2004–05	52	21	28	0	3	-	60	133	175	12	No playoffs
2005–06	52	28	17	-	0	7	84	158	150	7	Lost in semifinals
2006–07	52	26	17	-	4	5	84	162	157	6	Lost in quarterfinals
2007–08	56	27	17	-	3	9	86	171	171	8	Lost in preliminary finals
2008–09	52	33	14	-	3	2	101	173	151	2	Lost in semifinals
2009–10	56	28	14	-	4	10	94	169	177	4	Champions
2010–11	52	26	21	-	4	1	81	154	160	5	Lost in quarterfinals
2011–12	52	18	31	-	2	1	51	119	161	14	No playoffs
2012–13	52	24	25	-	2	1	72	124	148	11	No playoffs
