= 2004–05 DEL season =

2004–05 Deutsche Eishockey Liga season
- League: Deutsche Eishockey Liga
- Sport: Ice Hockey
- Teams: 14
- TV partner: Premiere

2004-05
- Season champions: Eisbären Berlin

DEL seasons
- ← 2003–04 2005–06 →

The 2004–05 Deutsche Eishockey Liga season was the 11th season since the founding of the Deutsche Eishockey Liga (English: German Ice Hockey League). The Eisbären Berlin (English: Polar Bears Berlin) became first time German Champion, a feat they will repeat a number of times in the next seasons. The Kassel Huskies was allowed to stay in the league, despite losing the play-down, as Grizzly Adams Wolfsburg lost its DEL license.

The season was significant, due to the NHL lockout. 22 NHL players came to play the season in the DEL, with the Iserlohn Roosters making the first move by signing up Mike York. Several German national team players came as well -- Marco Sturm, Jochen Hecht and Olaf Kölzig. Other significant signings included Stéphane Robidas and Doug Weight midseason signups for the previous season champion the Frankfurt Lions. Erik Cole, who would have been playing with the Carolina Hurricanes, was named MVP of the playoffs with the Eisbären Berlin.

== Regular season ==
The regular season was played from September 17, 2004 to March 13, 2005.

	Team	GP	Won	Lost	GF:GA	Points
1.	Frankfurt Lions (M)	52	35	17	197:124	103
2.	Eisbären Berlin	52	32	20	166:141	101
3.	Nürnberg Ice Tigers	52	33	19	188:131	95
4.	Kölner Haie	52	29	23	146:120	92
5.	ERC Ingolstadt	52	31	21	149:139	91
6.	Adler Mannheim	52	26	26	151:150	80
7.	Augsburger Panther	52	24	28	150:154	76
8.	Hamburg Freezers	52	26	26	133:148	76
9.	Krefeld Pinguine	52	25	26	145:159	73
10.	DEG Metro Stars	52	24	28	139:152	71
11.	Iserlohn Roosters	52	21	31	138:156	64
12.	Hannover Scorpions	52	21	31	133:175	60
13.	Grizzly Adams Wolfsburg (N)	52	19	32	134:174	58
14.	Kassel Huskies	52	17	35	127:173	52

GP = Games played; GF:GA = Goals for and against
Color code: = Direct Playoff qualification, = Playoff qualification round, = No playoff

== Playdowns ==
The two last placed, Grizzly Adams Wolfsburg and Kassel Huskies played a "playdown" in a Best-of-seven series starting March 18, 2005.

			Serie	1	2	3	4	5	6	7
Grizzly Adams Wolfsburg	–	Kassel Huskies	4:3	2:0	0:3	7:0	2:4	0:2	4:1	3:2

The Kassel Huskies were set to be relegated to the 2. Bundesliga, but due to the Grizzly Adams losing their DEL license, they were allowed to stay. The Grizzly Adams lost the license as their new Arena was not finished in time, and the old one did not conform to the DEL rules.

== Playoffs ==
Quarterfinals
1.	Frankfurt Lions	4
8.	Hamburg Freezers	2
3.	Nürnberg Ice Tigers	2
6.	Adler Mannheim	4
2.	Eisbären Berlin	4
7.	Augsburger Panther	2
4.	Kölner Haie	3
5.	ERC Ingolstadt	4

Semifinals
1.	Frankfurt Lions	2
6.	Adler Mannheim	3
2.	Eisbären Berlin	3
5.	ERC Ingolstadt	1

Finals
6.	Adler Mannheim	0
2.	Eisbären Berlin	3
