= 2005–06 DEL season =

2005–06 Deutsche Eishockey Liga season
- League: Deutsche Eishockey Liga
- Sport: Ice hockey
- Teams: 14

2005-06
- Season champions: Eisbären Berlin

DEL seasons
- ← 2004–05 2006–07 →

The 2005–06 Deutsche Eishockey Liga season was the 12th season since the founding of the Deutsche Eishockey Liga (German Ice Hockey League). The German champion Eisbären Berlin defended its title in the final game on 17 April 2005. The Kassel Huskies left the league after losing in the playoff against the new DEL team the Füchse Duisburg.

== Regular season ==
Position	Team	GP	Won	Lost	GF:GA	Points
1.	Eisbären Berlin (M)	52	34	18	181:142	100
2.	ERC Ingolstadt	52	33	19	162:120	98
3.	DEG Metro Stars	52	30	22	171:143	93
4.	Nürnberg Ice Tigers	52	28	24	137:120	91
5.	Kölner Haie	52	30	22	185:143	89
6.	Hamburg Freezers	52	29	23	144:145	85
7.	Hannover Scorpions	52	28	24	158:150	84
8.	Krefeld Pinguine	52	28	24	173:169	79
9.	Frankfurt Lions	52	23	29	124:137	70
10.	Adler Mannheim	52	23	29	148:155	68
11.	Iserlohn Roosters	52	21	31	166:178	65
12.	Augsburger Panther	52	20	32	139:184	61
13.	Kassel Huskies	52	20	32	137:179	58
14.	Füchse Duisburg (N)	52	17	35	131:191	51

GP = Games played
Color code: = Direct playoff qualification, = Playoff qualification round, = No playoff

== Playoffs ==
Quarterfinals
1.	Eisbären Berlin	4
8.	Krefeld Pinguine	1
2.	ERC Ingolstadt	3
7.	Hannover Scorpions	4
3.	DEG Metro Stars	4
6.	Hamburg Freezers	2
4.	Nürnberg Ice Tigers	0
5.	Kölner Haie	4

Semifinals
1.	Eisbären Berlin	3
7.	Hannover Scorpions	0
3.	DEG Metro Stars	3
4.	Kölner Haie	2

Finals
1.	Eisbären Berlin	3
3.	DEG Metro Stars	0
