= 2009–10 DEL season =

2009–10 Deutsche Eishockey Liga season
- League: Deutsche Eishockey Liga
- Sport: Ice Hockey
- Teams: 15

Regular season
- Season champions: Eisbären Berlin
- Top scorer: Jeff Ulmer

Finals
- Champions: Hannover Scorpions
- Runners-up: Augsburger Panther

DEL seasons
- ← 2008–09 2010–11 →

The 2009–10 Deutsche Eishockey Liga season is the 16th season since the founding of the Deutsche Eishockey Liga (English: German Ice Hockey League). Prior to the season, the Füchse Duisburg voluntarily left the league due to financial hardship. Bietigheim Steelers, champions of the 2. Bundesliga had an opportunity to join the league, but canceled their licensing application.

A change from the previous season was the renaming of the Sinupret Ice Tigers, who are playing under the new name Thomas Sabo Ice Tigers. During the previous season it became obvious that the Ice Tigers were in a dire financial situation. On 25 November 2008 preliminary insolvency was filed and, on 30 December 2008, declared. This led to the corporate sponsor Bionorica pulling their support in March 2009. An investor group led by local jeweler Thomas Sabo intervened on 3 April 2009, pre-empting bankruptcy proceedings and ensuring participation in the 2009–10 season.

== Teams ==
Teams of the 2009–10 DEL season

Team	City	Arena
Augsburger Panther	Augsburg	Curt Frenzel Stadium
Eisbären Berlin	Berlin	O2 World
DEG Metro Stars	Düsseldorf	ISS Dome
Frankfurt Lions	Frankfurt	Eissporthalle Frankfurt
Hamburg Freezers	Hamburg	Color Line Arena
Hannover Scorpions	Hanover	TUI Arena
ERC Ingolstadt	Ingolstadt	Saturn Arena
Iserlohn Roosters	Iserlohn	Eissporthalle Iserlohn
Kassel Huskies	Kassel	Eissporthalle Kassel
Kölner Haie	Cologne	Lanxess Arena
Krefeld Pinguine	Krefeld	König Palast
Adler Mannheim	Mannheim	SAP Arena
Thomas Sabo Ice Tigers	Nuremberg	Nuremberg Arena
Straubing Tigers	Straubing	Eisstadion am Pulverturm
Wolfsburg Grizzly Adams	Wolfsburg	Eisarena Wolfsburg

== Regular season ==
	Team	GP	W	OTW	SOW	OTL	SOL	L	Goals	Points
1.	Eisbären Berlin	56	36	2	4	1	2	11	209:156	123
2.	Frankfurt Lions	56	28	2	4	1	1	20	191:161	98
3.	Grizzly Adams Wolfsburg	56	27	3	3	2	2	19	192:152	97
4.	Hannover Scorpions	56	24	2	2	4	10	14	169:177	94
5.	Thomas Sabo Ice Tigers	56	27	1	0	4	4	20	152:158	91
6.	DEG Metro Stars	56	25	2	3	3	2	21	181:148	90
7.	ERC Ingolstadt	56	24	5	2	3	0	22	205:181	89
8.	Augsburger Panther	56	24	2	5	1	0	24	201:188	87
9.	Adler Mannheim	56	23	2	2	4	3	22	177:177	84
10.	Kölner Haie	56	19	3	3	4	1	26	178:190	74
11.	Iserlohn Roosters	56	18	4	4	3	1	26	166:183	74
12.	Krefeld Pinguine	56	20	1	3	0	4	28	167:173	72
13.	Straubing Tigers	56	18	3	2	0	6	27	149:193	70
14.	Hamburg Freezers	56	16	2	2	4	1	31	162:200	61
15.	Kassel Huskies	56	16	2	0	2	2	34	151:213	56

GP = Games Played, W = Wins, OTW = Overtime win, SOW = Shootout win, OTL = Overtime loss, SOL = Shootout loss, L = Loss

Color code: = Direct Playoff qualification, = Playoff qualification round, = No playoff

Source: DEL.org

Player	Club	Games	Goals	Assists	Points
(Canada) Jeff Ulmer	Frankfurt Lions	56	37	37	74
(Germany) Thomas Greilinger	ERC Ingolstadt	55	38	35	73
(Norway) Tore Vikingstad	Hannover Scorpions	51	14	50	64
(Germany) Darin Olver	Augsburger Panther	56	26	34	60
(Germany) Robert Hock	Iserlohn Roosters	56	17	42	59

Source: DEL.org

== Playoffs ==
=== Qualification ===
			Series	1	2	3	[HR]
Augsburger Panther	–	Adler Mannheim	2:0	4:1	3:2	–	[3:1]
ERC Ingolstadt	–	Kölner Haie	2:1	1:6	3:2 OT	6:3	[2:2]

=== Bracket ===
Quarterfinals
4	Hannover Scorpions	3
5	Nürnberg Ice Tigers	2
2	Frankfurt Lions	1
7	ERC Ingolstadt	3
3	Grizzly Adams Wolfsburg	3
6	DEG Metro Stars	0
1	Eisbären Berlin	2
8	Augsburger Panther	3

Semifinals
4	Hannover Scorpions	3
7	ERC Ingolstadt	0
3	Grizzly Adams Wolfsburg	1
8	Augsburger Panther	3

Final
4	Hannover Scorpions	3
8	Augsburger Panther	0

=== Quarterfinals ===
			Series	1	2	3	4	5	[HR]
Eisbären Berlin	–	Augsburger Panther	2:3	2:1	1:2	3:5	5:3	2:6	[2:2]
Frankfurt Lions	–	ERC Ingolstadt	1:3	3:0	0:2	1:4	2:3 OT	–	[1:3]
Grizzly Adams Wolfsburg	–	DEG Metro Stars	3:0	4:2	6:3	3:1	–	–	[2:2]
Hannover Scorpions	–	Thomas Sabo Ice Tigers	3:2	3:2 OT	4:3	2:5	1:4	4:3	[1:3]

=== Semifinals ===
			Series	1	2	3	4	5	[HR]
Grizzly Adams Wolfsburg	–	Augsburger Panther	1:3	2:3 OT	0:1	6:1	2:3	–	[3:1]
Hannover Scorpions	–	ERC Ingolstadt	3:0	6:0	4:1	5:4 OT	–	–	[2:2]

=== Final ===
			Series	1	2	3	4	5	[HR]
Hannover Scorpions	–	Augsburger Panther	3:0	3:1	3:2 OT	4:2	–	–	[2:2]
