= 2006–07 DEL season =

2006–07 Deutsche Eishockey Liga season
- League: Deutsche Eishockey Liga
- Sport: Ice hockey
- Teams: 14

2006–07
- Season champions: Adler Mannheim

DEL seasons
- ← 2005–06 2007–08 →

The 2006–07 Deutsche Eishockey Liga season was the 13th season since the founding of the Deutsche Eishockey Liga (DEL; German Ice Hockey League). The league was played with 14 clubs in the 2006–07 season, the same number as the previous season. However, in place of the Kassel Huskies, who were relegated the previous season, the Straubing Tigers took part in the competition, having won the 2nd Bundesliga in 2005–06. The format had slightly changed from the previous season. Each club played the other four times, resulting in 52 regular-season games per club. The top six clubs at the end of the regular season qualified for the first round of the play-offs. The clubs seven to ten played a preliminary round to determine the last two places for the first round. For the teams placed eleven to fourteen, the season ended.

No club was relegated from the DEL this season and the Adler Mannheim (Eagles Mannheim) won its 5th DEL Championship.

== Regular season ==
Position	Name	P	Won	OTW	PW	OTL	PL	Lost	GF	GA	Points
1	Adler Mannheim	52	29	4	2	5	3	9	184	147	107
2	DEG Metro Stars	52	28	4	1	2	2	15	163	127	98
3	Sinupret Ice Tigers	52	26	4	4	1	0	17	181	136	95
4	Kölner Haie	52	28	1	1	2	4	16	180	146	94
5	ERC Ingolstadt	52	28	1	1	2	4	16	180	146	94
6	Hannover Scorpions	52	23	2	1	4	5	17	162	157	84
7	Hamburg Freezers	52	20	6	4	1	2	19	169	153	83
8	Frankfurt Lions	52	24	3	1	1	2	21	171	171	83
9	Eisbären Berlin (C)	52	22	1	1	3	4	21	171	157	77
10	Krefeld Pinguine	52	18	2	4	2	3	23	170	173	71
11	Iserlohn Roosters	52	18	2	4	1	3	24	148	163	70
12	Straubing Tigers (N)	52	12	4	4	3	1	28	135	189	56
13	Augsburger Panther	52	11	2	4	2	1	32	148	205	48
14	EV Duisburg	52	8	1	2	4	1	36	118	218	35

- Abbreviations: P = Games played, OTW = Overtime win, PW = Win after penalty shootout, OTL = Overtime loss, PL = Loss after penalty shoutout, GF = Goals for, GA = Goals against, (C) = Defending champion, (N) = New club
- Source:"DEL 2006-07". Official DEL website. Archived from the original on 2007-10-20.

=== Play-offs ===
The four rounds of the 2006-07 play-offs were played under the following system:

- Preliminary round: Best-of-three
- First round: Best-of-seven
- Semi finals: Best-of-five
- Finals: Best-of-five

Like the regular season, in the play-offs games will be decided by penalty shoot-outs (P) after a five-minute overtime (OT) sudden-death. In all play-off rounds the higher placed team from the regular season has home advantage in the uneven numbered games (Game 1, 3, 5, 7) and the other team in the even numbered games (Game 2, 4, 6).

==== Preliminary round ====
Team	Team	Game 1	Game 2	Game 3
Hamburg Freezers	Krefeld Pinguine	5-3	5-3	—
Frankfurt Lions	Eisbären Berlin	3-4	2-1	6-0

==== First round ====
Team	Team	Game 1	Game 2	Game 3	Game 4	Game 5	Game 6	Game 7
Adler Mannheim	Frankfurt Lions	4-3 OT	6-2	2-1	2-4	3-2	—	—
DEG Metro Stars	Hamburg Freezers	3-2	4-0	5-4 OT	1-3	6-1	—	—
Sinupret Ice Tigers	Hannover Scorpions	3-5	2-3	3-0	3-2	3-2 OT	3-2 OT	—
ERC Ingolstadt	Kölner Haie	1-5	1-4	6-2	0-1 OT	6-4	1-5	—

==== Semi finals ====
Team	Team	Game 1	Game 2	Game 3	Game 4	Game 5
Adler Mannheim	Kölner Haie	7-2	6-4	2-0	—	—
DEG Metro Stars	Sinupret Ice Tigers	2-3	3-4 P	5-4 OT	0-1	—

==== Finals ====
Team	Team	Game 1	Game 2	Game 3	Game 4	Game 5
Adler Mannheim	Sinupret Ice Tigers	3-2 OT	6-2	5-2	—	—

- The Adler Mannheim are the 2006-07 champions of the DEL.

=== Play-off tree ===
First round
1	Adler Mannheim	4
8	Frankfurt Lions	1
4	ERC Ingolstadt	4
5	Kölner Haie	1
2	DEG Metro Stars	4
7	Hamburg Freezers	2
3	Sinupret Ice Tigers	2
6	Hannover Scorpions	4

Semi final
1	Adler Mannheim	3
5	Kölner Haie	0
2	DEG Metro Stars	1
3	Sinupret Ice Tigers	3

Final
1	Adler Mannheim	3
3	Sinupret Ice Tigers	0

=== Top scorers ===
The five highest placed scores in the regular season and play-offs are:

==== Regular season ====
Player	Club	Games	Goals	Assists	Points
(Canada) David McLlwain	Kölner Haie	52	21	41	62
(Canada) François Fortier	Hamburg Freezers	52	28	31	59
(Canada) Brad Smyth	Hamburg Freezers	52	23	36	59
(Canada) François Méthot	Adler Mannheim	52	19	38	57
(Latvia) Herberts Vasiļjevs	Krefeld Pinguine	51	30	24	57

==== Play-offs ====
Player	Club	Games	Goals	Assists	Points
(Canada) Colin Forbes	Adler Mannheim	11	4	10	14
(Canada) Jame Pollock	Sinupret Ice Tigers	13	5	9	14
(Canada) David McLlwain	Kölner Haie	9	4	10	14
(Canada) Jason Jaspers	Adler Mannheim	11	6	7	13
(United States) Brian Swanson	Sinupret Ice Tigers	13	4	7	11
