= 2008–09 DEL season =

2008–09 Deutsche Eishockey Liga season
- League: Deutsche Eishockey Liga
- Sport: Ice Hockey
- Teams: 16

Regular season
- Season champions: Eisbären Berlin
- Top scorer: Jason Ulmer; Robert Hock

Finals
- Champions: Eisbären Berlin

DEL seasons
- ← 2007–08 2009–10 →

The 2008–09 Deutsche Eishockey Liga season was the 15th season since the founding of the Deutsche Eishockey Liga (English: German Ice Hockey Leagie). 16 Teams played after the 2. Bundesliga Champion, the Kassel Huskies received the license to play in the DEL. After 52 rounds and the play-off's, the Eisbären Berlin won its 4th German Championship in the last five years.

== Teams ==
Teams of the 2008-09 DEL season

Team	City	Arena	Budget Million €	Attendance Regular Season	Attendance Playoffs
Augsburger Panther	Augsburg	Curt Frenzel Stadium	3.1	3,678	5,052
Eisbären Berlin	Berlin	O2 World	7.7	13,746	14,083
DEG Metro Stars	Düsseldorf	ISS Dome	7.2	6,084	9,943
Frankfurt Lions	Frankfurt	Eissporthalle Frankfurt	4.8	6,208	5,650
Füchse Duisburg	Duisburg	Scania Arena	4.0	1,792	
Hamburg Freezers	Hamburg	Color Line Arena	7.1	7,949	6,660
Hannover Scorpions	Hanover	TUI Arena	7.1	7,949	6,660
ERC Ingolstadt	Ingolstadt	Saturn Arena	6.2	3,346	
Iserlohn Roosters	Iserlohn	Eissporthalle Iserlohn	4.5	3,864	
Kassel Huskies	Kassel	Eissporthalle Kassel	3.1	4,071	
Kölner Haie	Cologne	Lanxess Arena	6.5	10,342	
Krefeld Pinguine	Krefeld	König Palast	4.1	4,491	7,819
Adler Mannheim	Mannheim	SAP Arena	8.0	11,756	12,237
Sinupret Ice Tigers	Nuremberg	Nuremberg Arena	4.8	4,322	7,976
Straubing Tigers	Straubing	Eisstadion am Pulverturm	3.7	4,226	
Wolfsburg Grizzly Adams	Wolfsburg	Eisarena Wolfsburg	4.5	2,328	2,560

In accordance to the cooperation contract between the DEL and the German Ice Hockey Federation, and after concluding that necessary reforms where not done in the 2. Bundesliga, a decision was made not to have playdowns and no teams were relegated. However, after ensuring compliance with the DEL regulations, the 2. Bundesliga Champions, the Kassel Huskies, were allowed to enter the league on July 4, 2008, expanding the league to 16 teams. This is also the first season where the Eisbären Berlin played in the brand new O2 World arena.

The number of regular seasons rounds was reduced to 52 from 56 in the previous season. The 6-best placed teams qualified for the playoffs, the teams in 7-10th position where to play a qualification round.

The average team budget was estimate at Euro € 5.24 million, raising the league total to Euro € 84.3 million from Euro € 78.7, mainly due to the addition of 1 team.

== Regular season ==
	Team	GP	W	OTW	SOW	OTL	SOL	L	Goals	Points
1.	Eisbären Berlin	52	31	1	4	0	2	14	214:143	105
2.	Hannover Scorpions	52	30	2	1	3	2	14	173:151	101
3.	DEG Metro Stars	52	24	2	3	3	3	17	159:134	88
4.	Adler Mannheim	52	22	3	4	3	2	18	144:131	85
5.	Sinupret Ice Tigers	52	23	6	1	1	1	20	153:142	85
6.	Krefeld Pinguine	52	24	3	1	3	1	20	167:140	84
7.	Grizzly Adams Wolfsburg	52	25	0	1	5	1	20	180:141	83
8.	Hamburg Freezers	52	22	1	4	2	4	19	158:147	82
9.	Frankfurt Lions	52	21	3	3	1	4	20	152:152	80
10.	Augsburger Panther	52	24	1	1	2	2	22	156:178	80
11.	Iserlohn Roosters	52	15	4	3	5	7	18	171:187	71
12.	ERC Ingolstadt	52	18	3	1	4	2	24	144:155	68
13.	Straubing Tigers	52	17	3	4	1	2	25	144:164	68
14.	Kassel Huskies	52	15	2	6	2	2	25	147:171	65
15.	Kölner Haie	52	15	4	0	5	5	23	147:166	63
16.	Füchse Duisburg	52	9	3	3	1	0	36	118:225	40

GP = Games Played, W = Wins, OTW = Overtime win, SOW = Shootout win, OTL = Overtime loss, SOL = Shootout loss, L = Loss
Color code: = Direct Playoff qualification, = Playoff qualification round, = No playoff

== Playoffs ==
=== Playoff qualifications ===
The playoff qualifications were played between March 5 and 11, 2009 in the Best-of-five mode.

			Series	1	2	3	4	5	RS
Grizzly Adams Wolfsburg	–	Augsburger Panther	3:1	1:2	4:1	1:0	4:3 OT	–	[2:2]
Hamburg Freezers	–	Frankfurt Lions	3:2	3:4	1:2	2:1	2:1 OT	4:2	[1:3]

RS = Regular season; OT = Overtime

=== Playoff brackets ===
Quarterfinals
1.	Eisbären Berlin	4
8.	Hamburg Freezers	0
4.	Adler Mannheim	4
5.	Sinupret Ice Tigers	1
2.	Hannover Scorpions	4
7.	Wolfsburg Grizzly Adams	2
3.	DEG Metro Stars	4
6.	Krefeld Pinguine	3

Semifinals
1.	Eisbären Berlin	3
4.	Adler Mannheim	1
2.	Hannover Scorpions	2
3.	DEG Metro Stars	3

Finals
1.	Eisbären Berlin	3
3.	DEG Metro Stars	1

=== Quarterfinals ===
The quarterfinals were played in the Best-of-seven mode starting March 13 until March 26.

			Series	1	2	3	4	5	6	7	RS
Eisbären Berlin	–	Hamburg Freezers	4:0	5:3	3:2 OT	7:2	4:1	−	−	−	[3:1]
Hannover Scorpions	–	Grizzly Adams Wolfsburg	4:2	2:1	2:3 OT	2:3	4:3 OT	4:3	2:0	−	[1:1]
DEG Metro Stars	–	Krefeld Pinguine	4:3	2:3	4:3 OT	1:2	5:4 OT	2:1	3:4	5:0	[3:1]
Adler Mannheim	–	Sinupret Ice Tigers	4:1	5:0	3:5	3:2	2:1	5:2	−	−	[0:4]

RS = Regular season; OT = Overtime

=== Semifinals ===
The semifinals were played in the Best-of-five mode, from March 29 to April 7, 2010.

			Series	1	2	3	4	5	RS
Eisbären Berlin	–	Adler Mannheim	3:1	4:0	1:6	4:0	6:4	–	[2:2]
Hannover Scorpions	–	DEG Metro Stars	2:3	5:2	2:4	6:3	3:4 OT	1:3	[1:1]

RS = Regular season; OT = Overtime

=== Finale ===
The finals were played in the Best-of-five mode, from April 9, 2010.

			Series	1	2	3	4	5	RS
Eisbären Berlin	–	DEG Metro Stars	3:1	3:2	1:3	5:1	4:2	–	[3:1]

RS = Regular season; OT = Overtime

The Eisbären Berlin won the title for the 4th time.
