= 2008 IIHF Inline Hockey World Championship =

International sports tournament

Tournament details
- Host country: Slovakia
- Venue: 1 (in 1 host city)
- Dates: 21 June 21 – 28 June 2008
- Teams: 8

Final positions
- Champions: Sweden (4th title)
- Runners-up: Slovakia
- Third place: Germany
- Fourth place: United States

Tournament statistics
- Games played: 24
- Goals scored: 263 (10.96 per game)
- Attendance: 18,619 (776 per game)
- Scoring leader: (United States) Pat Lee (18 pts)

Awards
- MVP: (Sweden) Dick Axelsson

The 2008 IIHF Inline Hockey World Championship was the 12th IIHF Inline Hockey World Championship, an international inline hockey tournament run by the International Ice Hockey Federation. The World Championship runs alongside the 2008 IIHF Inline Hockey World Championship Division I tournament and took place between 21 and 28 June 2008 in Bratislava, Slovakia. The tournament was won by Sweden, earning their second straight World Championship title and fourth overall. Slovakia finished in second place and Germany in third after defeating the United States in the bronze medal match. Austria, after losing the seventh place game against Slovenia was relegated to Division I for 2009. The event chairman was Hans Dobida.

== Seeding and groups ==
The seeding in the preliminary round was based on the final standings at the 2007 IIHF Inline Hockey World Championship. The World Championship groups are named Group A and Group B while the 2008 IIHF Inline Hockey World Championship Division I tournament uses Group C and Group D, as both tournaments were held in Bratislava, Slovakia. The teams were grouped accordingly by seeding at the previous year's tournament (in parentheses is the corresponding seeding):

Group A

- Sweden (1)
- Austria (4)
- Slovenia (5)
- Slovakia (8)

Group B

- Finland (2)
- Germany (3)
- United States (6)
- Czech Republic (7)

== Preliminary round ==
Eight participating teams were placed in the following two groups. After playing a round-robin, the top three teams in each group advance to the playoff round. The last team in each group compete in the qualifying round where they face-off against the top ranked teams of Group C and Group D from the Division I tournament for a chance to participate in the Top Division playoffs.

All times are local (UTC+2).

=== Group A ===
Team	Pld	W	OTW	OTL	L	GF	GA	GD	Pts	Qualification
Slovenia	3	3	0	0	0	19	7	+12	9	Playoff round
Sweden	3	2	0	0	1	16	9	+7	6	Playoff round
Slovakia	3	1	0	0	2	9	13	−4	3	Playoff round
Austria	3	0	0	0	3	7	22	−15	0	Qualifying round

21 June 2008; 18:00	Austria	4 – 6 (1–1, 0–2, 2–2, 1–1)	Slovakia	Main Arena, Bratislava; Attendance: 1,125

Game reference
Heimo Lindner (1) 6:13 (ES); Martin Mairitsch (1) 32:21 (ES); Heimo Lindner (2) 35:48 (ES); Martin Mairitsch (2) 36:39 (ES) / Goals / Peter Staron (1) 10:10 (SH); Andrej Szoke (1) 16:52 (ES); Richard Kapus (1) 18:47 (PP); Henrich Ruckay (1) 26:09 (ES); Henrich Ruckay (2) 34:56 (ES)(GWG); Roman Simunek (1) 47:59 (ENG)
6.0 min	Penalties	6.0 min
34	Shots	25

22 June 2008; 14:00	Austria	1 – 8 (0–2, 1–0, 0–2, 0–4)	Slovenia	Main Arena, Bratislava

Game reference
Harry Lange (1) 13:04 (PP) / Goals / Jaka Zupanc (1) 1:17 (ES); Rok Bavdaz (1) 10:21 (ES)(GWG); Jure Stopar (1) 28:59 (SH); Jan Loboda (1) 35:37 (ES); Jaka Zupanc (2) 38:11 (ES); Nejc Sotlar (1) 42:09 (ES); Rok Bavdaz (2) 45:40 (ES); Matic Kralj (1) 46:08 (ES)
16.0 min	Penalties	10.5 min
35	Shots	64

22 June 2008; 18:00	Slovakia	0 – 5 (0–0, 0–2, 0–2, 0–1)	Sweden	Main Arena, Bratislava

Game reference
Goals / Andreas Svensson (1) 12:54 (ES); Kristian Luukkonen (1) 14:32 (ES); Linus Klasen (1) 26:34 (PP); Johan Olsson (1) 28:25 (ES); Ludvig Rantanen (1) 45:18 (ES)
13.5 min	Penalties	9.0 min
31	Shots	49

23 June 2008; 20:00	Sweden	3 – 7 (0–1, 0–2, 2–3, 1–1)	Slovenia	Main Arena, Bratislava; Attendance: 726

Game reference
Linus Klasen (2) 32:35 (ES); Fredrick Eriksson (1) 34:59 (PP); Simon Olsson (1) 46:06 (PP) / Goals / Jure Stopar (2) 10:11 (PP); Dejan Zemva (1) 14:28 (ES); Tadej Nabergoj (1) 14:53 (ES); Rok Bavdaz (3) 24:35 (ES); Matic Kralj (2) 27:49 (PP); Tadej Nabergoj (2) 28:55 (ES); Nejc Sotlar (2) 44:32 (SH)
12.0 min	Penalties	21.0 min
63	Shots	47

24 June 2008; 18:00	Slovenia	4 – 3 (1–0, 1–1, 1–0, 1–2)	Slovakia	Main Arena, Bratislava; Attendance: 1,120

Game reference
Nejc Sotlar (3) 11:12 (ES); Nejc Sotlar (4) 18:51 (ES); Nejc Sotlar (5) 27:35 (ES); Jure Stopar (3) 39:46 (ES) / Goals / Andrej Szoke (2) 23:40 (ES); Peter Staron (2) 41:01 (PP); Martin Galik (1) 47:29 (PP)
18.0 min	Penalties	15.0 min
54	Shots	53

24 June 2008; 20:00	Sweden	8 – 2 (3–0, 0–1, 3–1, 2–0)	Austria	Main Arena, Bratislava; Attendance: 300

Game reference
Andreas Svensson (2) 2:56 (PP); Jonas Karlsson (1) 3:25 (ES); Dick Axelsson (1) 10:29 (PP); Dick Axelsson (2) 30:23 (PP); Daniel Wessner (1) 32:18 (PP); Dave Lindarv (1) 34:10 (ES); Dick Axelsson (3) 42:30 (SH); Johan Olsson (2) 46:47 (ES) / Goals / Heimo Lindner (3) 13:25 (PP); Alexander Holler (1) 32:42 (ES)
24.5 min	Penalties	15.0 min
66	Shots	28

=== Group B ===
Team	Pld	W	OTW	OTL	L	GF	GA	GD	Pts	Qualification
United States	3	3	0	0	0	22	14	+8	9	Playoff round
Czech Republic	3	2	0	0	1	17	15	+2	6	Playoff round
Finland	3	0	1	0	2	12	14	−2	2	Playoff round
Germany	3	0	0	1	2	13	21	−8	1	Qualifying round

22 June 2008; 16:00	Germany	3 – 9 (1–2, 1–3, 1–1, 0–3)	United States	Main Arena, Bratislava

Game reference
Michael Wolf (1) 3:23 (ES); Steffen Tolzer (1) 18:20 (ES); Michael Wolf (2) 24:39 (PP) / Goals / James Beilsten (1) 2:23 (ES); James Beilsten (2) 7:13 (SH); Dan Comrie (1) 16:29 (PP); Kyle Gouge (1) 17:25 (PP)(GWG); James Beilsten (3) 22:39 (ES); Lee Sweatt (1) 34:23 (ES); Christopher Peterson (1) 39:15 (PP); Kyle Gouge (2) 41:05 (ES); Pat Lee (2) 45:47 (ES)
10.5 min	Penalties	13.5 min
27	Shots	46

22 June 2008; 20:00	Czech Republic	4 – 2 (1–0, 1–0, 1–1, 1–1)	Finland	Main Arena, Bratislava

Game reference
Jiri Polansky (1) 10:08 (ES); Petr Tenkrat (1) 14:19 (ES); Pavel Strycek (1) 29:05 (ES)(GWG); Jiri Polansky (2) 47:42 (ENG) / Goals / Aki Tuominen (1) 33:00 (PP); Tuomas Valosaari (1) 39:00 (PP)
13.5 min	Penalties	6.0 min
42	Shots	59

23 June 2008; 16:00	Germany	6 – 7 (3–1, 1–2, 2–2, 0–2)	Czech Republic	Main Arena, Bratislava; Attendance: 522

Game reference
Thomas Greilinger (1) 6:49 (PP); Martin Ortolf (1) 7:08 (ES); Florian Zeller (1) 11:19 (ES); Patrick Reimer (1) 16:56 (ES); Daniel Huhn (1) 32:27 (ES); Michael Wolf (3) 33:27 (PP) / Goals / Petr Hemsky (1) 4:50 (ES); Ales Hemsky (1) 13:44 (ES); Martin Vozdecky (1) 20:40 (ES); Ludek Broz (1) 27:05 (PP); Karel Rachůnek (1) 32:09 (PP); Karel Rachůnek (2) 38:12 (PP); Jiri Polansky (2) 46:52 (ES)(GWG)
10.5 min	Penalties	10.5 min
57	Shots	27

23 June 2008; 18:00	Finland	5 – 6 (3–2, 0–1, 0–2, 2–1)	United States	Main Arena, Bratislava; Attendance: 724

Game reference
Tommy Bruce (1) 6:20 (ES); Kyle Gouge (3) 9:09 (ES); Lee Sweatt (2) 20:02 (ES); Pat Lee (3) 29:33 (ES); Tommy Bruce (2) 31:36 (ES); Kyle Gouge (4) 42:24 (ES)(GWG) / Goals / Tommi Heinonen (1) 1:50 (ES); Jani Lyytinen (1) 8:00 (ES); Kari Lohtander (1) 8:13 (ES); Aki Tuominen (2) 43:50 (PP); Sami Markkanen (1) 45:05 (ES)
22.0 min	Penalties	20.0 min
48	Shots	64

24 June 2008; 14:00	United States	7 – 6 (4–1, 1–1, 1–4, 1–0)	Czech Republic	Main Arena, Bratislava; Attendance: 459

Game reference
Dan Comrie (2) 00:37(ES); Steven Oleksy (1) 6:29 (PP); Kyle Gouge (5) 7:00 (ES); Lee Sweatt (3) 11:00 (PP); Rafael Rodriquez (1) 21:43 (PP); Dan Comrie (3) 32:17 (PP); Kyle Gouge (6) 40:01 (ES)(GWG) / Goals / Tomas Mojzis (1) 4:08 (PP); Jiri Polansky (4) 18:42 (PP); Petr Tenkrat (2) 26:41 (PP); Martin Vozdecky (2) 29:41 (PP); Petr Tenkrat (3) 30:46 (PP); Tomas Mojzis (2) 34:06 (PP)
13.5 min	Penalties	15.0 min
48	Shots	40

24 June 2008; 16:00	Finland	5 – 4 (SO) (0–2, 0–0, 4–0, 0–2, 0–0, 1–0)	Germany	Main Arena, Bratislava; Attendance: 444

Game reference
Tuomas Valosaari (2) 27:53 (PP); Tuomas Valosaari (3) 29:16 (ES); Ossi Pellinen (1) 35:00 (ES); Sami Markkanen (2) 35:39 (ES); Tuomas Valosaari (4) 53:00 (SO)(GWG) / Goals / Daniel Menge (1) 1:11 (ES); Thomas Greilinger (2) 3:56 (PP); Michael Wolf (4) 44:42 (PP); Thomas Greilinger (3) 47:44 (ES)
16.5 min	Penalties	6.0 min
39	Shots	73

== Qualifying round ==
Austria and Germany advanced to the qualifying round after finishing last in Group A and Group B respectively. Austria faced off against Great Britain, who finished first in Group C of the Division I tournament, and Germany was drawn against Canada, who finished first in Group D of the Division I tournament, for a chance to participate in the Top Division playoffs. Both Austria and Germany won their matches and advanced to the Top Division playoffs, while Great Britain and Canada advanced to the Division I playoffs.

All times are local (UTC+2).

25 June 2008; 16:00	Germany	11 – 3 (3–0, 2–1, 3–1, 3–1)	Canada	Bratislava, Slovakia; Attendance: 660

Game reference
Steffen Tolzer (1) 2:12 (PP); Henrick Holscher (1) 5:59 (PP); Martin Ortolf (1) 10:49 (ES); Thomas Greilinger (1) 13:10 (ES)(GWG); Miachel Wolf (1) 14:38 (PP); Miachel Wolf (2) 24:53 (PP); Daniel Menge (1) 34:45 (PP); Daniel Menge (2) 35:12 (ES); Patrick Reimer (1) 41:53 (PP); Christian Wichert (1) 44:51 (ES); Patrick Reimer (2) 46:17 (PP) / Goals / David Hammond (1) 15:41 (PP); Mitchell Vevang (1) 25:50 (PP); David Hammond (2) 44:22 (ES)
27.5 min	Penalties	18.0 min
54	Shots	48

25 June 2008; 18:00	Austria	6 – 1 (0–1, 4–0, 2–0, 0–0)	Great Britain	Bratislava, Slovakia; Attendance: 506

Game reference
Harry Lange (1) 13:27 (PP); Mark Brunnegger (1) 13:31 (ES)(GWG); Heimo Lindner (1) 19:43 (PP); Mark Brunnegger (1) 20:56 (ES); Christian Dolezal (1) 25:17 (ES); Youssef Riener (1) 34:23 (ES) / Goals / John Dolan (1) 4:22 (PP)
7.5 min	Penalties	7.5 min
40	Shots	41

== Playoff round ==
Germany and Austria advanced to the playoff round after winning their qualifying round matches. They were seeded alongside the six other teams of the tournament based on their results in the preliminary round. The four winning quarterfinalists advanced to the semifinals while the losing teams moved on to the placement round. Austria was relegated to Division I for 2009 after losing the seventh place game against Slovenia, while the Czech Republic finished fifth after defeating Finland in the fifth place game. In the semifinals the Slovakia defeated Germany and Sweden beat the United States, both advancing to the gold medal game. After losing the semifinals the United States and Germany played off for the bronze medal with Germany winning 8–7. Sweden defeated Slovakia 7–3 in the gold medal game, earning their second straight World Championship title and fourth overall.

=== Draw ===
Quarterfinals
A1	Slovenia	2
Q1	Germany	5
B2	Czech Republic	5
A3	Slovakia	6
A2	Sweden	9
B3	Finland	3
B1	United States	17
Q2	Austria	1

Semifinals
QF1	Germany	2
QF2	Slovakia	3
QF3	Sweden	12
QF4	United States	8

Finals
SF1	Slovakia	3
SF2	Sweden	7
Bronze medal game
SF1	Germany	8
SF2	United States	7

=== Quarterfinals ===
26 June 2008; 14:00	Sweden	9 – 3 (3–0, 5–0, 0–0, 1–3)	Finland	Main Arena, Bratislava; Attendance: 471

Game reference
Fredrick Eriksson (2) 3:50 (PP); Linus Klasen (3) 10:19 (PP); Daniel Wessner (2) 11:46 (ES); Linus Klasen (4) 16:00 (ES); Johan Olsson (3) 16:13 (ES); Linus Klasen (5) 18:58 (ES); Johan Olsson (4) 19:55 (ES); Andreas Svensson (3) 21:17 (ES); Carl Berglund (1) 41:29 (ES) / Goals / Tommi Heinonen (1) 38:18 (SH); Olli Lehtinen (1) 40:49 (PP); Juhani Holm (1) 42:52 (ES)
10.5 min	Penalties	15.0 min
71	Shots	51

26 June 2008; 16:00	United States	17 – 1 (4–0, 5–1, 4–0, 4–0)	Austria	Main Arena, Bratislava; Attendance: 324

Game reference
Pat Lee (3) 00:26 (ES); Derek Kern (1) 01:31 (ES)(GWG); James Beilsten (4) 05:14 (PP); Steven Oleksy (2) 05:34 (ES); Lee Sweatt (4) 12:54 (ES); Kyle Gouge (7) 18:28 (ES); James Beilsten (5) 19:32 (ES); Pat Lee (4) 22:53 (PP); Itan Chavira (1) 23:59 (ES); Tommy Bruce (3) 27:36 (ES); Dan Comrie (4) 29:28 (ES); Itan Chavira (2) 29:39 (ES); Kevin De Vergilio (1) 31:43 (SH); Dan Comrie (5) 38:28 (ES); Kevin De Vergilio (2) 40:44 (PP); Sam Ftorek (1) 44:21 (PP); Kyle Gouge (8) 44:44 (ES) / Goals / Georg Privoznik (1) 17:29 (ES)
1.5 min	Penalties	23.5 min
74	Shots	22

26 June 2008; 18:00	Czech Republic	5 – 6 (OT) (0–0, 2–2, 1–2, 2–1, 0–1)	Slovakia	Main Arena, Bratislava; Attendance: 1343

Game reference
Karel Rachůnek (3) 13:05 (PP); Ales Hemsky (2) 21:15 (ES); Ales Hemsky (3) 28:07 (PP); Ales Hemsky (4) 37:27 (ES); Jiri Polansky (5) 39:24 (PP) / Goals / Roman Simunek (2) 20:29 (ES); Martin Galik (2) 23:48 (ES); Martin Klucar (1) 24:26 (ES); Lubomir Visnovsky (1) 30:19 (ES); Jakub Ruckay (1) 38:05 (ES); Richard Kapus (1) 50:22 (ES)(GWG)
6.0 min	Penalties	6.0 min
40	Shots	41

26 June 2008; 20:00	Slovenia	2 – 5 (0–1, 1–1, 1–0, 0–3)	Germany	Main Arena, Bratislava; Attendance: 397

Game reference
Tadej Nabergoj (3) 22:25 (ES); Matic Kralj (3) 24:49 (ES) / Goals / Henrick Holscher (1) 11:26 (ES); Thomas Greilinger (4) 13:05 (ES); Patrick Reimer (2)(GWG) 40:20 (ES); Florian Zeller (2) 45:52 (ES); Henrick Holscher (2) 47:48 (PP)
26.0 min	Penalties	3.0 min
32	Shots	47

=== Placement round ===
==== 5th place game ====
27 June 2008; 14:00	Czech Republic	10 – 8 (1–4, 4–0, 2–1, 3–3)	Finland	Main Arena, Bratislava; Attendance: 79

Game reference
Aki Tuominen (3) 00:53 (PP); Jaakko Rissanen (1) 05:53 (ES); Aki Tuominen (4) 08:58 (ES); Olli Lehtinen (2)11:19 (ES); Jaakko Rissanen (2) 26:25 (ES); Jaakko Rissanen (3) 36:22 (ES); Aki Tuominen (5) 41:50 (PP); Aki Tuominen (6) 43:04 (ES) / Goals / Ladislav Vlcek (1) 09:42 (ES); Karel Rachůnek (4) 16:22 (PP); Ales Hemsky (5) 17:16 (ES); Ales Hemsky (6) 21:19 (PP); Jiri Polansky (6) 22:24 (ES); Jiri Polansky (7) 24:40 (ES); Karel Rachůnek (5) 35:06 (SH); Karel Rachůnek (6) 38:02 (PP); Ladislav Vlcek (2) 42:16 (ES)(GWG); Jan Besser (2) 44:42 (ES)
7.5 min	Penalties	7.5 min
38	Shots	48

==== 7th place game ====
27 June 2008; 16:00	Slovenia	9 – 2 (2–0, 3–2, 3–0, 1–0)	Austria	Main Arena, Bratislava; Attendance: 317

Game reference
Dejan Zemva (2) 07:14 (PP); Eric Pance (1) 10:46 (ES); Tadej Nabergoj (4) 21:19 (PP); Rok Bavdaz (4) 22:31 (ES); Jaka Zupanc (3) 23:10 (ES); Marjan Manfreda (1) 28:10 (ES); Jure Stopar (4) 32:58 (ES); Nejc Sotlar (6) 34:37 (ES); Jure Stopar (5) 40:53 (ES) / Goals / Youssef Riener (1) 20:56 (SH); Alexander Holler (2) 23:44 (ES)
13.5 min	Penalties	12.0 min
56	Shots	35

=== Semifinals ===
27 June 2008; 18:00	Germany	2 – 3 (OT) (0–1, 0–1, 2–0, 0–0, 0–1)	Slovakia	Main Arena, Bratislava; Attendance: 2261

Game reference
Patrick Reimer (3) 26:27 (PP); Patrick Reimer (4) 34:12 (ES) / Goals / Marek Horsky (1) 11:11 (ES); Peter Strapaty (1) 23:09 (ES); Peter Staron (3) 48:19 (ES)(GWG)
1.5 min	Penalties	4.5 min
39	Shots	40

27 June 2008; 20:00	United States	8 – 12 (0–2, 6–5, 1–2, 1–3)	Sweden	Main Arena, Bratislava; Attendance: 695

Game reference
Sam Ftorek (2) 12:34 (PP); Kyle Gouge (9) 13:03 (PP); Dan Comrie (6) 14:34 (ES); Pat Lee (5) 15:14 (PP); Kevin De Vergilio (3) 19:41 (ES); Kyle Gouge (10) 23:03 (PP); James Beilsten (6) 27:33 (ES); Sam Ftorek (3) 44:14 (ES) / Goals / Dick Axelsson (4) 00:43 (ES); Dick Axelsson (5) 03:29 (ES); Dick Axelsson (6) 12:12 (SH); Martin Thelander (1) 13:24 (ES); Linus Klasen (6) 18:45 (ES); Kristian Luukkonen (2) 19:14 (ES); Linus Klasen (7) 20:45 (ES); Linus Klasen (8) 25:03 (PP); Daniel Wessner (3) 27:00 (ES)(GWG); Fredrik Eriksson (3) 38:44 (PP); Dick Axelsson (7) 46:21 (ES); Dick Axelsson (8) 47:29 (ES)
25.0 min	Penalties	22.0 min
55	Shots	44

=== Bronze medal game ===
28 June 2008; 16:00	United States	7 – 8 (3–1, 1–2, 1–3, 2–2)	Germany	Main Arena, Bratislava; Attendance: 1125

Game reference
Pat Lee (6) 04:32 (ES); Kevin De Vergilio (4) 07:24 (ES); Kyle Gouge (11) 11:13 (ES); Itan Chavira (3) 23:00 (ES); Derek Kern (3) 30:27 (ES); Pat Lee (7) 38:27 (ES); Pat Lee (8) 42:49 (ES) / Goals / Henrik Holscher (3) 04:11 (ES); Steffen Tolzer (2) 12:36 (ES); Thomas Greilinger (5) 19:30 (PP); Patrick Reimer (5) 24:41 (ES); Thomas Greilinger (6) 24:58 (ES); Thomas Greilinger (7) 33:07 (ES); Patrick Reimer (6) 41:56 (ES); Marian Bazany (1) 47:07 (ES)(GWG)
3.0 min	Penalties	3.0 min
58	Shots	38

=== Gold medal game ===
28 June 2008; 18:00	Sweden	7 – 3 (3–1, 2–0, 1–1, 1–1)	Slovakia	Main Arena, Bratislava; Attendance: 5021

Game reference
Kristian Luukkonen (3) 08:34 (ES); Andreas Svensson (4) 08:54 (ES); Dick Axelsson (9) 09:57 (PP); Daniel Wessner (4) 19:21 (PP); Daniel Brolin (1) 23:41 (SH); Daniel Wessner (5) 34:04 (PP); Kristian Luukkonen (4) 40:19 (ES) / Goals / Peter Staron (4) 05:43 (ES); Jakub Ruckay (2) 28:33 (PP); Lubomir Visnovsky (2) 39:03 (ES)
10.5 min	Penalties	26.5 min
44	Shots	30

== Ranking and statistics ==
2008 IIHF Inline Hockey World Championship winners

Sweden
4th title

=== Tournament awards ===
- Best players selected by the directorate:
  - Best Goalkeeper: (Finland) Sasu Hovi
  - Best Defenseman: (United States) Lee Sweatt
  - Best Forward: (Sweden) Linus Klasen
  - Most Valuable Player: (Sweden) Dick Axelsson

=== Final standings ===
The final standings of the tournament according to IIHF:

Rk.	Team
1st place, gold medalist(s)	Sweden
2nd place, silver medalist(s)	Slovakia
3rd place, bronze medalist(s)	Germany
4.	United States
5.	Czech Republic
6.	Finland
7.	Slovenia
8.	Austria

=== Scoring leaders ===
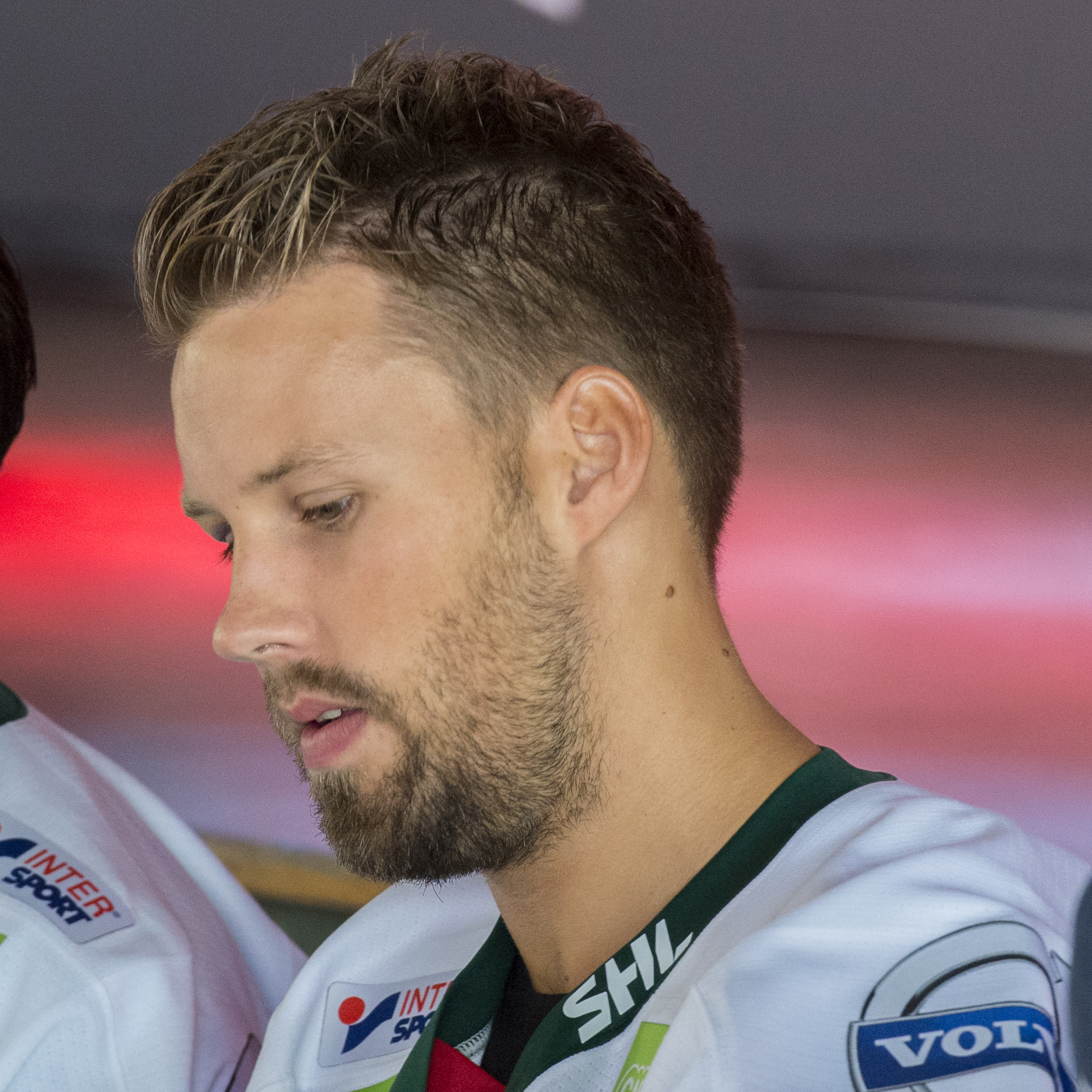
Sweden's Dick Axelsson recorded 16 points in six and was named the tournaments most valuable player

List shows the top 10 skaters sorted by points, then goals. If the list exceeds 10 skaters because of a tie in points, all of the tied skaters are left out. Games from the qualifying round do not count towards the Division I statistics.

Player	GP	G	A	Pts	+/–	PIM	POS
(United States) Pat Lee	6	8	10	18	+11	0.0	F
(Sweden) Dick Axelsson	6	9	7	16	+9	16.0	F
(United States) Kyle Gouge	6	11	2	13	+14	0.0	F
(Sweden) Linus Klasen	6	8	3	11	+4	4.5	F
(Czech Republic) Jiří Polanský	5	7	4	11	–2	4.5	F
(Czech Republic) Ales Hemsky	5	6	5	11	+1	4.5	D
(Germany) Patrick Reimer	6	6	5	11	+1	3.0	F
(United States) Steven Oleksy	6	2	9	11	+6	3.0	D
(Czech Republic) Martin Vozdecky	5	2	9	11	0	7.5	F

=== Leading goaltenders ===
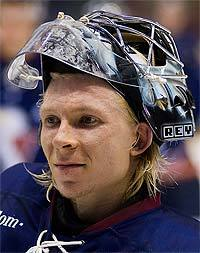
Sasu Hovi of Finland finished third among the goaltenders after finishing with a save percentage of 91.30

Only the top five goaltenders, based on save percentage, who have played at least 40% of their team's minutes are included in this list. Games from the qualifying round do not count towards the Division I statistics.

Player	MIP	SOG	GA	GAA	SVS%	SO
(Slovenia) Gašper Krošelj	228:00	226	14	2.21	93.81	0
(Sweden) Dennis Karlsson	259:12	210	17	2.36	91.90	1
(Finland) Sasu Hovi	206:39	253	22	3.83	91.30	0
(Czech Republic) Tomáš Štůrala	167:24	176	18	3.87	89.77	0
(Slovakia) Jozef Ondrejka	290:21	260	27	3.35	89.62	0
