= 2008 IIHF Inline Hockey World Championship Division I =

International sports tournament

Tournament details
- Host country: Slovakia
- Venues: 2 (in 1 host city)
- Dates: 22–28 June 2008
- Teams: 8

Tournament statistics
- Games played: 24
- Goals scored: 280 (11.67 per game)
- Attendance: 5,465 (228 per game)
- Scoring leader: (Canada) Cory Conacher

The 2008 IIHF Inline Hockey World Championship Division I was an international inline hockey tournament run by the International Ice Hockey Federation. The Division I tournament ran alongside the 2008 IIHF Inline Hockey World Championship and took place between 22 and 28 June 2008 in Bratislava, Slovakia. The tournament was won by Canada who upon winning gained promotion to the 2009 IIHF Inline Hockey World Championship. While Bulgaria and New Zealand were relegated to the continental qualifications after losing their relegation round games.

== Qualification ==
See also: 2008 IIHF InLine Hockey World Championship Division I Qualification

Six nations returned to Division I after automatically qualifying based on their results from the 2007 Division I tournament. Bulgaria and Canada qualified for the two remaining spots, replacing Namibia and South Africa who were relegated after losing their 2007 relegation round games.

- Australia – Finished fourth in 2007 World Championship Division I
- Brazil – Finished first in 2007 World Championship Division I
- Bulgaria – Qualification spot
- Canada – Qualification spot
- Great Britain – Finished fifth in 2007 World Championship Division I
- Hungary – Finished third in 2007 World Championship Division I
- Japan – Finished sixth in 2007 World Championship Division I
- New Zealand – Finished second in 2007 World Championship Division I

== Seeding and groups ==
The seeding in the preliminary round was based on the final standings at the 2007 IIHF Inline Hockey World Championship Division I tournament. Division I's groups are named Group C and Group D while the 2008 IIHF Inline Hockey World Championship use Group A and Group B, as both tournaments are held in Bratislava, Slovakia. The teams were grouped accordingly by seeding at the previous year's tournament (in parentheses is the corresponding seeding):

Group C

- Brazil (9)
- Australia (12)
- Great Britain (13)
- Bulgaria (16)

Group D

- New Zealand (10)
- Hungary (11)
- Japan (14)
- Canada (15)

== Preliminary round ==
Eight participating teams were placed in the following two groups. After playing a round-robin, the top two teams advance to the Qualifying round where they face-off against the two last-placed teams of the Groups A and B from the Top Division tournament for a chance to participate in the Top Division playoffs. Teams finishing second through to fourth advance to the Playoff round.

All times are local (UTC+2).

=== Group C ===
Team	Pld	W	OTW	OTL	L	GF	GA	GD	Pts	Qualification
Great Britain	3	3	0	0	0	30	14	+16	9	Qualifying round
Brazil	3	2	0	0	1	27	16	+11	6	Playoff round
Australia	3	1	0	0	2	20	22	−2	3	Playoff round
Bulgaria	3	0	0	0	3	6	31	−25	0	Playoff round

22 June 2008; 15:00	Australia	7–11 (1–4, 1–2, 3–1, 2–4)	Great Britain	Small Arena, Bratislava; Attendance: 115

Game reference
Daniel Pederson (1) 3:33 (ES); Lee McLauchlan (1) 23:55 (PP); Jordan Gavin (1) 27:22 (PP); Jordan Gavin (2) 30:57 (ES); Jordan Gavin (3) 33:20 (ES); Daniel Pederson (2) 36:20 (ES); Olivier Rozdarz (1) 43:00 (ES) / Goals / Joe Wightman (1) 4:00 (ES); William Mark Thomas (1) 6:03 (PP); Alex Pearman (1) 9:24 (ES); John Dolan (1) 11:42 (ES); Alex Pearman (2) 12:07 (ES); Alex Pearman (3) 19:55 (ES); William Mark Thomas (2) 29:42 (PP); John Dolan (2) 37:56 (PP)(GWG); William Mark Thomas (3) 38:42 (ES); Simon Hehir (1) 41:13 (PP); Mark Hallam (1) 41:52 (PP)
12.0 min	Penalties	6.0 min

22 June 2008; 19:00	Bulgaria	2–13 (0–2, 1–2, 0–5, 1–4)	Brazil	Small Arena, Bratislava; Attendance: 99

Game reference
Plamen Veselinov (1) 12:29 (ES); Anguel Alexandrov (1) 38:52 (PP) / Goals / Bruno Gomes (1) 1:23 (ES); Bruno Gomes (2) 4:37 (PP); Leandro Silva (1) 12:49 (ES); Pedro Raposo (1) 14:50 (PP); Lucas Ota (1) 25:45 (PP); Pedro Raposo (2) 27:09 (ES); Bruno Gomes (3) 29:57 (PP); Leandro Silva (2) 30:47 (ES); Bruno Gomes (4) 33:47 (SH); Bruno Gomes (5) 37:05 (ES); Luis Custodio (1) 40:25 (ES); Caua Guzman (1) 43:05 (ES); Thiago Souza (1) 47:41 (ES)
13.5 min	Penalties	9.0 min

23 June 2008; 15:00	Australia	10–3 (2–1, 3–0, 2–1, 3–1)	Bulgaria	Small Arena, Bratislava; Attendance: 58

Game reference
Olivier Rozdarz (2) 9:09 (ES); Lee McLauchlan (2) 11:51 (PP); Sean Jones (1) 14:23 (ES); Lee McLauchlan (3) 18:06 (ES)(GWG); Antony Collins (1) 20:08 (ES); Olivier Rozdarz (3) 26:43 (SH); Peter Matus (1) 27:50 (SH); Olivier Rozdarz (4) 36:18 (ES); Olivier Rozdarz (5) 39:55 (ES); Sean Jones (2) 44:00 (PP) / Goals / Plamen Veselinov (2) 8:34 (PP); Simeon Radkov (1) 28:16 (ES); Anguel Alexandrov (2) 40:27 (ES)
7.5 min	Penalties	6.0 min

23 June 2008; 19:00	Brazil	6–11 (0–3, 2–4, 3–4, 1–0)	Great Britain	Small Arena, Bratislava; Attendance: 45

Game reference
Luiz Almedia (1) 13:37 (PP); Pedro Raposo (3) 23:33 (PP); Pedro Raposo (4) 26:30 (PP); Rogerio Polido (1) 27:25 (ES); Lucas Ota (2) 32:41 (ES); Bruno Gomes (6) 41:43 (PP) / Goals / Alex Pearman (4) 4:34 (ES); John Dolan (3) 7:39 (PP); John Dolan (4) 10:35 (ES); William Mark Thomas (4) 14:11 (PP); John Dolan (5) 16:38 (ES); John Dolan (6) 17:01 (ES); Simon Hehir (2) 21:47 (PP); John Dolan (7) 24:51 (ES); John Dolan (8) 28:28 (ES); Simon Hehir (3) 31:42 (PP); Christopher Colegate (1) 33:29 (PP)
9.0 min	Penalties	9.0 min

24 June 2008; 15:00	Great Britain	8–1 (1–0, 1–0, 4–0, 2–1)	Bulgaria	Small Arena, Bratislava; Attendance: 86

Game reference
Mark Hallam (2) 8:28 (PP); Joe Wightman (2) 19:47 (ES); Remi Moses (1) 26:34 (PP); Karl Niamatali (1) 27:31 (ES); Remi Moses (2) 28:22 (ES); Scott Glover (1) 29:11 (ES); Karl Niamatali (2) 40:20 (PP); Joe Wightman (3) 45:59 (PP) / Goals / Stanislav Muhachov (1) 47:44 (ES)
9.0 min	Penalties	12.0 min
31	Shots	21

24 June 2008; 19:00	Brazil	8–3 (2–0, 0–0, 5–2, 1–1)	Australia	Small Arena, Bratislava; Attendance: 113

Game reference
Bruno Gomes (7) 00:40 (ES); Lucas Ota (3) 4:11 (ES); Rogerio Polido (2) 25:27 (ES); Henrique Degani (1) 27:59 (ES); Bruno Gomes (8) 28:37 (ES); Henrique Degani (2) 30:19 (ES); Bruno Gomes (9) 31:25 (ES); Bruno Gomes (10) 42:37 (ES) / Goals / Antony Deboos (1) 26:42 (ES); Peter Matus (2) 34:12 (SH); Peter Matus (3) 40:37 (ES)
3.0 min	Penalties	10.5 min
33	Shots	21

=== Group D ===
Team	Pld	W	OTW	OTL	L	GF	GA	GD	Pts	Qualification
Canada	3	3	0	0	0	39	3	+36	9	Qualifying round
Japan	3	1	1	0	1	14	22	−8	5	Playoff round
Hungary	3	1	0	1	1	16	24	−8	4	Playoff round
New Zealand	3	0	0	0	3	11	31	−20	0	Playoff round

22 June 2008; 13:00	Hungary	5 – 6 (OT) (1–2, 2–1, 0–1, 2–1, 0–1)	Japan	Small Arena, Bratislava; Attendance: 189

Game reference
Csaba Deak (1) 8:25 (ES); Marton Vas (1) 13:34 (SH); Marton Vas (2) 20:58 (ES); Marton Vas (3) 40:03 (ES); Marton Vas (4) 46:01 (PP) / Goals / Taku Kanatani (1) 7:30 (ES); Aguri Suzuki (1) 10:29 (ES); Aguri Suzuki (2) 20:24 (ES); Taku Kanatani (2) 35:35 (ES); Yoshinori Ishioka (1) 47:57 (ES); Yutaka Ono (1) 49:34 (ES)(GWG)
7.5 min	Penalties	13.5 min

22 June 2008; 17:00	Canada	13–2 (7–0, 2–0, 0–1, 4–1)	New Zealand	Small Arena, Bratislava; Attendance: 134

Game reference
David Hammond (1) 3:24 (ES); Johnathon Clewlow (1) 4:11(ES); Adam Ross (1) 6:43 (ES)(GWG); Cory Conacher (1) 7:09 (ES); Cory Conacher (2) 11:20 (ES); Adam Ross (2) 11:36 (ES); Johnathon Clewlow (2) 11:58(ES); Johnathon Spady (1) 20:11(ES); David Hammond (2) 23:01 (ES); Johnathon Spady (2) 42:27(ES); Kye Benjaminsen (1) 44:19(ES); Johnathon Spady (3) 45:06(ES); Derek Eison (1) 47:57(ES) / Goals / Craig Lawson (1) 31:47 (ES); Samuel Kay (1) 43:19 (ES)
6.0 min	Penalties	1.5 min

23 June 2008; 14:00	Hungary	0–14 (0–4, 0–4, 0–4, 0–2)	Canada	Main Arena, Bratislava; Attendance: 157

Game reference
Goals / Adam Ross (3) 5:54 (ES)(GWG); Mitchell Vevang (1) 7:27 (ES); Gregory Smith (1) 9:57 (ES); Kye Benjaminsen (2) 11:25(ES); Adam Ross (4) 13:12 (PP); David Hammond (3) 15:42 (ES); David Hammond (4) 18:54 (PP); Kirk French (1) 22:51 (ES); Cory Conacher (3) 29:14 (ES); Gregory Smith (2) 30:56 (ES); Jeremy McKibbon (1) 33:59 (ES); David Hammond (5) 33:59 (ES); Adam Ross (5) 38:00 (ES); Mitchell Vevang (2) 38:13 (ES)
7.5 min	Penalties	3.0 min

23 June 2008; 17:00	New Zealand	5–7 (1–1, 0–1, 3–2, 1–3)	Japan	Small Arena, Bratislava

Game reference
Matthew Harper (1) 8:21 (ES); Ryan Ruddle (1) 27:43 (PP); Craig Lawson (2) 30:49 (ES); James Trevena-Brown (1) 31:31 (ES); James Trevena-Brown (2) 43:39 (ES) / Goals / Yutaka Ono (2) 1:47 (ES); Osamu Ishibashi (1) 19:01 (ES); Daisuke Ohto (1) 30:11 (PP); Daisuke Ohto (2) 35:32 (ES); Osamu Ishibashi (2) 36:11 (ES); Daisuke Ohto (3) 41:10 (PP)(GWG); Shuhei Tadamura (1) 47:57 (ENG)
9.0 min	Penalties	4.5 min

24 June 2008; 13:00	Japan	1–12 (0–3, 1–2, 0–3, 0–4)	Canada	Small Arena, Bratislava; Attendance: 272

Game reference
Taku Kanatani (3) 16:24 (ES) / Goals / Gregory Smith (3) 6:24 (ES); Cory Conacher (4) 8:11 (ES); Cory Conacher (5) 10:44 (ES); Johnathon Clewlow (3) 17:21(ES); David Hammond (6) 20:41 (ES); Paul Patterson (1) 26:45 (ES); Gregory Smith (4) 29:03 (PP); David Filewich (1) 35:25 (ES); Kirk French (2) 38:18 (ES); Adam Ross (6) 41:51 (ES); Cory Conacher (6) 44:54 (PP); Johnathon Clewlow (4) 46:39 (ES)
3.0 min	Penalties	7.5 min
24	Shots	44

24 June 2008; 17:00	New Zealand	4–11 (1–1, 2–3, 0–3, 1–4)	Hungary	Small Arena, Bratislava; Attendance: 128

Game reference
Matthew Harper (2) 4:36 (PP); Craig Lawson (2) 30:49 (ES); Ryan Ruddle (3) 14:38 (ES); James Trevena-Brown (3) 47:43 (ES) / Goals / Viktor Tokaji (1) 11:30 (PP); Szilard Sandor (1) 18:26 (ES); Marton Vas (5) 23:22 (ES); Gergely Borbas (1) 23:43 (ES); David Szappanos (1) 24:53 (ES); Zoltan Revak (1) 26:50 (ES); Csaba Deak (2) 28:34 (PP); Arnold Feil (1) 36:47 (ES); Szilard Sandor (2) 38:11 (PS); Attila Hoffmann (1) 41:01 (PP); Zoltan Revak (2) 42:58 (ES)
6.0 min	Penalties	10.5 min
24	Shots	33

== Qualifying round ==
Great Britain and Canada advanced to the qualifying round after finishing first in Group C and Group D respectively. Great Britain faced off against Austria, who finished last in Group A of the Top Division tournament, and Canada was drawn against Germany, who finished last in Group B of the Top Division tournament, for a chance to participate in the Top Division playoffs. Both Great Britain and Canada lost their matches and advanced to the Division I playoffs, while Austria and Germany advanced to the Top Division playoffs.

All times are local (UTC+2).

25 June 2008; 16:00	Germany	11–3 (3–0, 2–1, 3–1, 3–1)	Canada	Main Arena, Bratislava; Attendance: 660

Game reference
Steffen Tolzer (1) 2:12 (PP); Henrick Holscher (1) 5:59 (PP); Martin Ortolf (1) 10:49 (ES); Thomas Greilinger (1) 13:10 (ES)(GWG); Miachel Wolf (1) 14:38 (PP); Miachel Wolf (2) 24:53 (PP); Daniel Menge (1) 34:45 (PP); Daniel Menge (2) 35:12 (ES); Patrick Reimer (1) 41:53 (PP); Christian Wichert (1) 44:51 (ES); Patrick Reimer (2) 46:17 (PP) / Goals / David Hammond (1) 15:41 (PP); Mitchell Vevang (1) 25:50 (PP); David Hammond (2) 44:22 (ES)
27.5 min	Penalties	18.0 min
54	Shots	48

25 June 2008; 18:00	Austria	6–1 (0–1, 4–0, 2–0, 0–0)	Great Britain	Main Arena, Bratislava; Attendance: 506

Game reference
Harry Lange (1) 13:27 (PP); Mark Brunnegger (1) 13:31 (ES)(GWG); Heimo Lindner (1) 19:43 (PP); Mark Brunnegger (1) 20:56 (ES); Christian Dolezal (1) 25:17 (ES); Youssef Riener (1) 34:23 (ES) / Goals / John Dolan (1) 4:22 (PP)
7.5 min	Penalties	7.5 min
40	Shots	41

== Playoff round ==
Great Britain and Canada advanced to the playoff round after losing their qualifying round matches. They were seeded alongside the six other teams of the tournament based on their results in the preliminary round. The four winning quarterfinalists advanced to the semifinals while the losing teams moved on to the relegation round. In the relegation round New Zealand and Bulgaria lost their games to Hungary and Japan respectively and were relegated to the continental qualifications. In the semifinals Great Britain defeated Brazil and Canada beat Australia, both advancing to the final. After losing the semifinals Australia and Brazil played off for the bronze medal with Brazil winning 4–3. Canada defeated Great Britain 7–4 in the final and earned promotion to the 2009 IIHF Inline Hockey World Championship.

=== Draw ===
Quarterfinals
QR1	Canada	9
C4	Bulgaria	1
D2	Japan	4
C3	Australia	5
QR2	Great Britain	7
D4	New Zealand	0
C2	Brazil	5
D3	Hungary	3

Semifinals
QF1	Canada	8
QF2	Australia	0
QF3	Great Britain	4
QF4	Brazil	3

Finals
SF1	Canada	7
SF2	Great Britain	4
Bronze medal game
SF1	Australia	3
SF2	Brazil	4

=== Quarterfinals ===
26 June 2008; 13:00	Japan	4–5 (0–1, 0–2, 3–1, 1–1)	Australia	Small Arena, Bratislava; Attendance: 120

Game reference
Yuji Kuchiba (1) 25:55 (PP); Shohei Asanuma (1) 34:09 (ES); Daisuke Ohto (4) 35:02 (ES); Yuji Kuchiba (2) 41:59 (PP) / Goals / Lee McLauchlan (4) 11:39 (PP); Sean Jones (3) 15:05 (PP); Jordan Gavin (4) 23:03 (ES); Jordan Gavin (5) 27:14 (PP); Olivier Rozdarz (6) 44:33 (PP)(GWG)

26 June 2008; 15:00	Brazil	5–3 (1–0, 1–2, 2–1, 1–0)	Hungary	Small Arena, Bratislava; Attendance: 200

Game reference
Pedro Raposo (5) 1:42 (PP); Diego Araujo (1) 21:50 (PP); Jose Guilardi (1) 32:11 (PP); Henrique Degani (3) 33:49 (ES)(GWG); Luiz Almedia (2) 40:43 (ES) / Goals / Marton Bontovics (1) 17:08 (PP); Gergely Borbas (2) 23:25 (ES); David Szappanos (2) 34:01 (ES)

26 June 2008; 17:00	Canada	9–1 (2–1, 3–0, 1–0, 3–0)	Bulgaria	Small Arena, Bratislava; Attendance: 199

Game reference
Johnathon Clewlow (5) 00:16 (ES); Johnathon Spady (4)(GWG) 08:39 (ES); Kye Benjaminsen (3) 13:22 (ES); Jeremy McKibbon (2) 16:11 (ES); Cory Conacher (7) 20:17 (PP); Gregory Smith (5) 27:45 (PP); Kirk French (3) 41:14 (ES); Paul Patterson (2) 41:46 (ES); Gregory Smith (6) 42:38 (ES) / Goals / Anguel Atanasov (1) 08:15 (ES)

26 June 2008; 19:00	Great Britain	7–0 (1–0, 1–0, 2–0, 3–0)	New Zealand	Small Arena, Bratislava; Attendance: 100

Game reference
Alex Pearman (5) 05:53 (ES); John Dolan (9) 13:14 (ES); Christopher Colegate (2) 25:52 (ES); Joe Wightman (4) 31:01 (ES); Mark Corfield (1) 31:01 (ES); John Dolan (10) 43:10 (ES); John Dolan (11) 43:43 (ES) / Goals

=== Relegation round ===
27 June 2008; 13:00	Hungary	7–6 (3–2, 2–1, 2–2, 0–1)	New Zealand	Small Arena, Bratislava; Attendance: 123

Game reference
Szilard Sandor (3) 05:16 (ES); Csaba Deak (3) 07:18 (ES); Gergely Borbas (3) 08:30 (ES); Marton Bontovics (2) 20:24 (PP); Zoltan Revak (3) 22:13 (PP); Tamas Dobos (1) 27:59 (ES); Szilard Sandor (4) 33:27 (PP)(GWG) / Goals / Ryan Ruddle (3) 00:52 (ES); James ODonnel (1) 08:02 (ES); James Trevena-Brown (4) 18:31 (PP); James Trevena-Brown (5) 32:14 (ES); Ryan Ruddle (4) 34:58 (ES); James Trevena-Brown (6) 46:04 (ES)

27 June 2008; 15:00	Japan	11–5 (2–1, 3–2, 2–1, 4–1)	Bulgaria	Small Arena, Bratislava; Attendance: 88

Game reference
Yuji Kuchiba (3) 01:50 (ES); Shuhei Tadamura (2) 06:11 (ES); Osamu Ishibashi (3) 14:39 (PP); Shuhei Tadamura (3) 17:08 (SH); Shohei Asanuma (2) 23:26 (ES); Osamu Ishibashi (4) 26:40 (ES)(GWG); Tomoyo Goto (1) 34:14 (ES); Taku Kanatani (4) 37:23 (ES); Taku Kanatani (5) 39:27 (ES); Shohei Asanuma (3) 42:05 (ES); Keisuke Matsuya (1) 45:12 (PP) / Goals / Simeon Radkov (2) 03:35 (ES); Aleksey Yotov (1) 16:31 (ES); Tsveatn Mihaylov (1) 22:11 (ES); Aleksey Yotov (2) 27:19 (ES); Aleksey Yotov (3) 36:55 (ES)

=== Semifinals ===
27 June 2008; 17:00	Great Britain	4–3 (0–2, 1–0, 1–0, 2–1)	Brazil	Small Arena, Bratislava; Attendance: 66

Game reference
Joe Wightman (5) 13:16 (ES); Andrew Sillitoe (1) 28:58 (ES); John Dolan (11) 37:41 (ES); Simon Hehir (4) 42:06 (ES)(GWG) / Goals / Lucas Ota (4) 05:31 (ES); Pedro Raposo (6) 07:59 (PP); Diego Araujo (1) 38:18 (ES)

27 June 2008; 19:00	Canada	8–0 (3–0, 1–0, 4–0, 0–0)	Australia	Small Arena, Bratislava; Attendance: 79

Game reference
David Hammond (7) 02:11 (PP); Cory Conacher (8) 03:38 (ES); Kye Benjaminsen (4) 11:59 (ES); Jeremy McKibbon (3) 18:14 (ES); Jeremy McKibbon (4) 25:48 (ES); David Hammond (8) 26:44 (ES); Cory Conacher (9) 29:18 (ES); Adam Ross (7) 32:56 (ES) / Goals

=== Third place game ===
28 June 2008; 12:00	Australia	3–4 (0–0, 0–1, 1–3, 2–0)	Brazil	Main Arena, Bratislava; Attendance: 849

Game reference
Jordan Gavin (6) 31:00 (ES); Antony Collins (2) 44:54 (ES); Jordan Gavin (7) 47:55 (ES) / Goals / Andrew Branco (1) 14:16 (ES); Luiz Almedia (3) 29:12 (ES); Lucas Ota (5) 31:22 (ES); Jose Guilardi (1) 33:07 (PP)

=== Final ===
28 June 2008; 14:00	Canada	7–4 (1–0, 1–1, 2–3, 3–0)	Great Britain	Main Arena, Bratislava; Attendance: 1079

Game reference
David Hammond (9) 00:14 (ES); David Hammond (10) 13:39 (PP); Paul Patterson (3) 25:01 (ES); Cory Conacher (10) 25:22 (ES); Cory Conacher (11) 39:43 (PP)(GWG); Mitchell Vevang (3) 41:08 (ES); Paul Patterson (4) 44:03 (ES) / Goals / Stu Brian (1) 19:32 (ES); Christopher Colegate (3) 24:27 (ES); Joe Wightman (6) 33:20 (ES); John Dolan (13) 35:05 (ES)

== Ranking and statistics ==
=== Standings ===
The final standings of the tournament according to IIHF:

Rk.	Team
1.	Canada
2.	Great Britain
3.	Brazil
4.	Australia
5.	Japan
6.	Hungary
7.	New Zealand
8.	Bulgaria

=== Tournament Awards ===
- Best players selected by the directorate:
  - Best Goalkeeper: (Canada) Derek Shybunka
  - Best Defenseman: (Brazil) Luiz Almeida
  - Best Forward: (United Kingdom) John Dolan

=== Scoring leaders ===
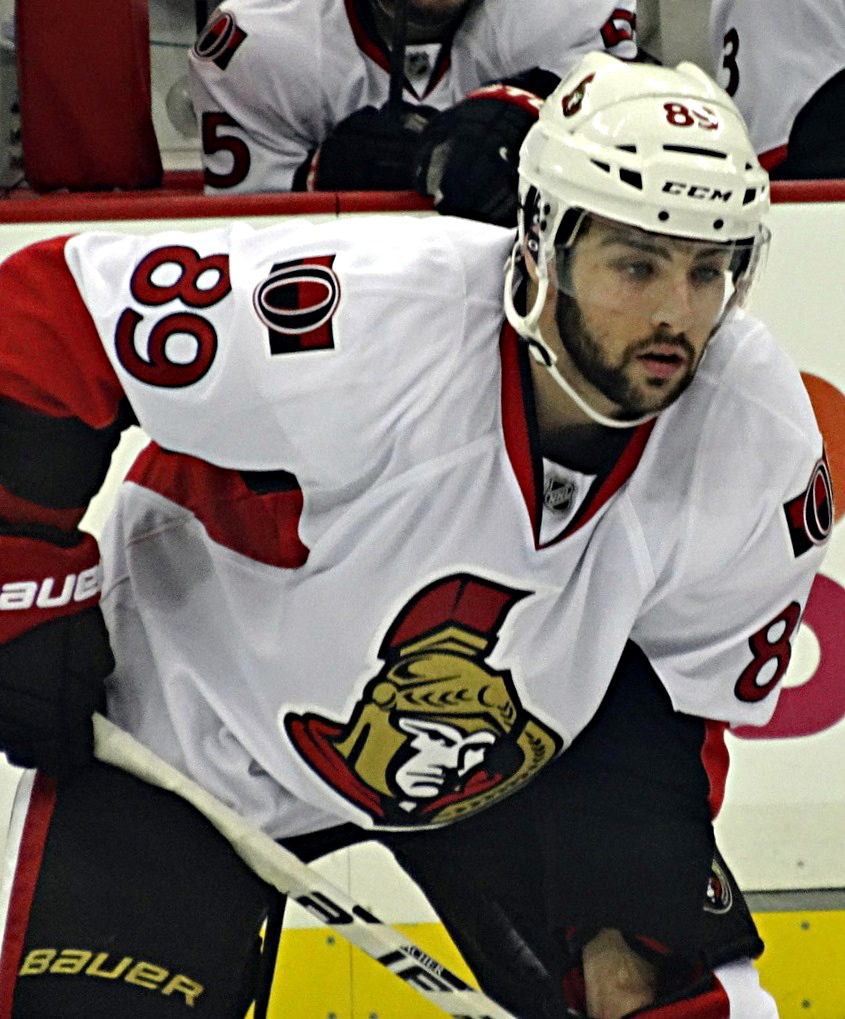
Canada's Cory Conacher scored eleven goals and ten assists in his six games

List shows the top skaters sorted by points, then goals. If the list exceeds 10 skaters because of a tie in points, all of the tied skaters are shown. Games from the qualifying round do not count towards the Division I statistics.

Player	GP	G	A	Pts	+/–	PIM	POS
(Canada) Cory Conacher	6	11	10	21	+23	1.5	F
(United Kingdom) John Dolan	6	13	7	20	+6	1.5	F
(Brazil) Bruno Gomes	6	10	7	17	+4	3.0	F
(Canada) David Hammond	6	10	7	17	+12	6.0	F
(Canada) Adam Ross	6	7	9	16	+26	4.5	D
(United Kingdom) Mark Thomas	6	4	11	15	+12	7.5	D
(Canada) Johnathon Clewlow	5	5	9	14	+21	3.0	F
(United Kingdom) Christopher Colgate	6	3	11	14	+5	4.5	F
(Canada) Kirk French	6	3	11	14	+14	6.0	D
(Brazil) Pedro Raposo	6	6	6	12	+2	1.5	F
(Canada) Jonathan Spady	6	4	8	12	+17	3.0	F
(Canada) Mitchell Vevang	6	3	9	12	+12	6.0	D
(Brazil) Diego Araujo	6	2	10	12	+2	6.0	F

=== Leading goaltenders ===
Only the top five goaltenders, based on save percentage, who have played at least 40% of their team's minutes are included in this list. Games from the qualifying round do not count towards the Division I statistics.

Player	MIP	SOG	GA	GAA	SVS%	SO
(Canada) Derek Shybunka	216:00	98	5	0.83	94.90	2
(United Kingdom) James Tanner	240:00	155	23	3.45	85.16	1
(Japan) Shingo Imagawa	192:08	154	23	4.31	85.06	0
(Australia) Jeremy Muir	191:21	150	24	4.52	84.00	0
(Brazil) Danilo Gazinhato	252:01	142	23	3.29	83.80	0
