= Johan Olsson =

Johan Olsson may refer to:

- Johan Olsson (ice hockey) (born 1978), Swedish ice hockey player
- Johan Olsson (skier) (born 1980), Swedish cross-country skier
- Johan Olsson, Swedish former guitarist of Dead by April
