= Lee Sweatt =

American ice hockey player (born 1985)

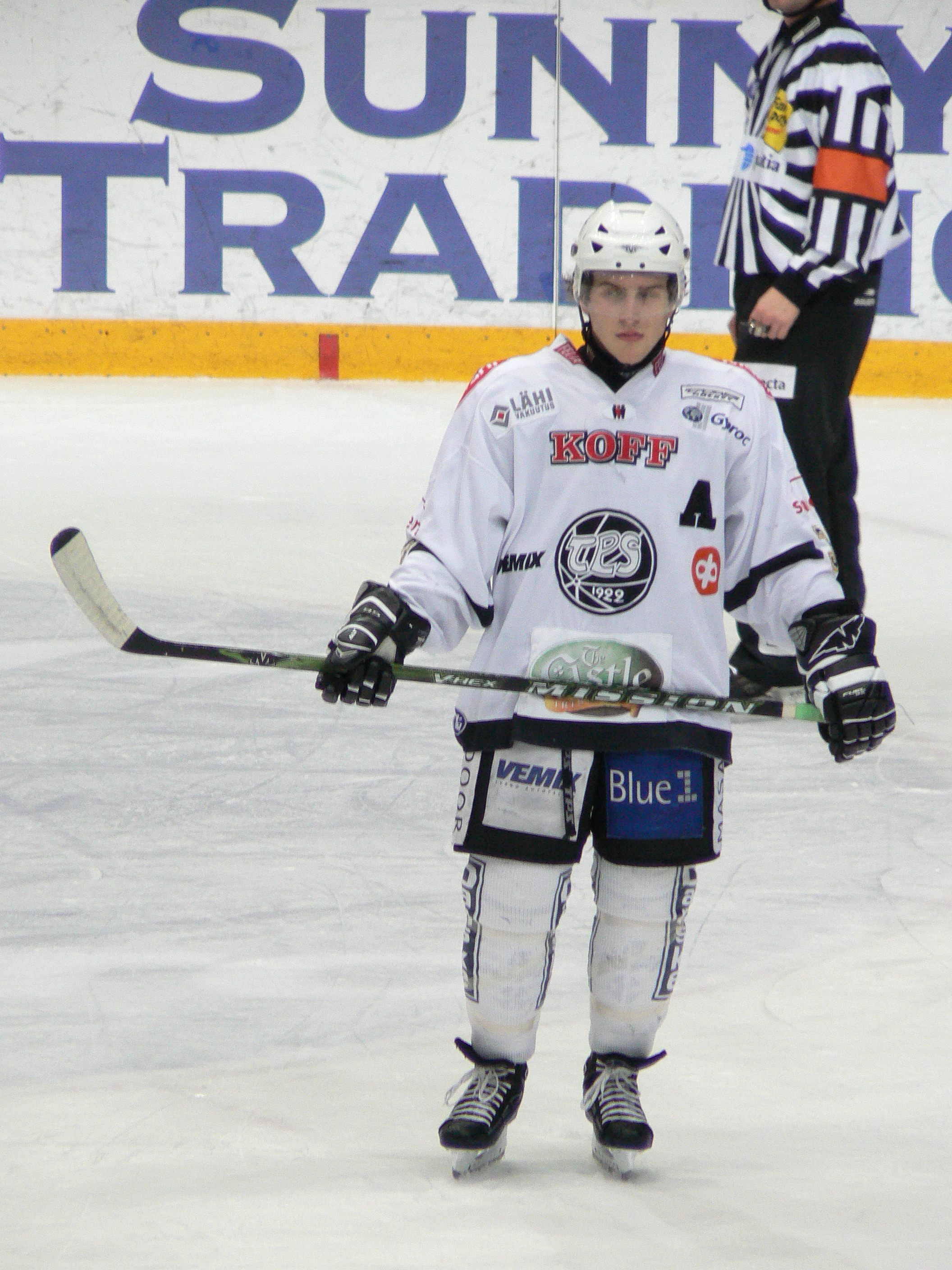
- Sweatt with TPS in January 2008
- Born: August 13, 1985 (age 41) Elburn, Illinois, U.S.
- Height: 5 ft 9 in (175 cm)
- Weight: 195 lb (88 kg; 13 st 13 lb)
- Position: Defense
- Shot: Right
- Played for: TPS; EC Red Bull Salzburg; Dinamo Riga; Vancouver Canucks
- NHL draft: Undrafted
- Playing career: 2007–2011

Walter Lee Sweatt (born August 13, 1985) is an American former professional ice hockey player. Sweatt played four years of professional hockey in Europe and North America. Sweatt played three games in the National Hockey League (NHL) in 2011, before retiring to work in the financial industry. His younger brother, Bill, was drafted by the Chicago Blackhawks in the 2007 NHL entry draft.

After a one-year stint with the Chicago Steel of the United States Hockey League (USHL), Sweatt played four seasons in the Western Collegiate Hockey Association (WCHA) with the Colorado College Tigers. During his senior year with Colorado, he served as team captain and received All-WCHA Third Team honors. Graduating with a degree in mathematical economics, he was named the WCHA Student-Athlete of the Year in 2007.

Undrafted by an NHL team, Sweatt played in Europe for four seasons with TPS of the Finnish SM-liiga, Dinamo Riga of the Kontinental Hockey League and EC Red Bull Salzburg of the Austrian Hockey League. After winning the Pekka Rautakallio trophy as the SM-liiga's best defenseman and the Kanada-malja as league champions with TPS in 2010, he returned to North America, signing with the Vancouver Canucks. He played the subsequent season with the Canucks' American Hockey League (AHL) affiliate, the Manitoba Moose, while also debuting in the NHL with the Canucks. In July 2011, he signed with the Senators.

Sweatt has also played inline hockey at the international level, competing for the United States' national team at seven consecutive IIHF InLine Hockey World Championships from 2002 to 2009. At the 2008 tournament, he earned the Best Defenseman award. He has also played for the United States national select team on two occasions, once in 2007 and another at the 2009 Deutschland Cup.

== Playing career ==
Sweatt played junior in the United States Hockey League (USHL) for the Chicago Steel before joining the college ranks for the Colorado College Tigers. He recorded 16 points over 37 games as a freshman in 2003–04. The following season, he improved to a college career-high 27 points while helping Colorado to a MacNaughton Cup as the Western Collegiate Hockey Association (WCHA) regular season champions (shared with the Denver Pioneers). Serving as team captain in his senior year, he scored a career-high 9 goals while adding 15 assists for 24 points. In addition to being his team's leading defenseman in scoring, Sweatt was named to the All-WCHA Third Team.

He joined the American Hockey League (AHL) immediately after completing his senior season with Colorado, signing an amateur tryout contract with the San Antonio Rampage on March 22, 2007. Appearing in 11 games for the remainder of the 2006-07 AHL season, he registered 1 assist. Also in 2007, Sweatt debuted with the United States' national select team in international competition.

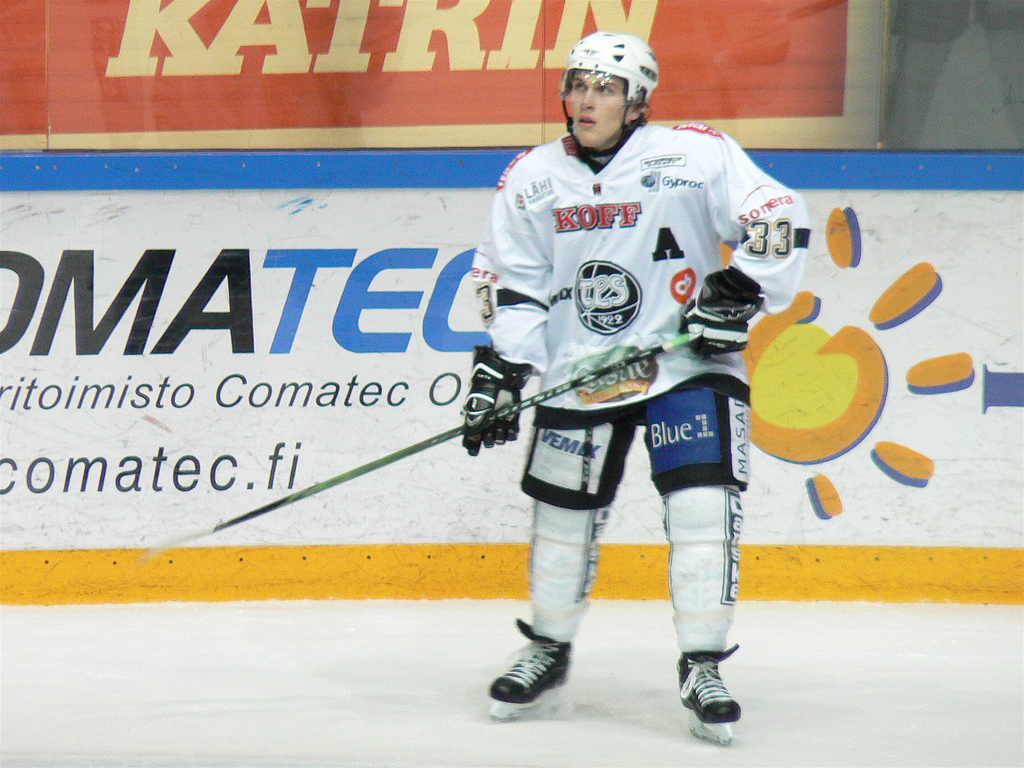
Sweatt played two seasons with Finnish club TPS.

Undrafted and unsigned by an NHL team, Sweatt joined Finnish club TPS of the SM-liiga for the 2007–08 season. Competing in his first full professional season, he recorded 15 goals and 33 points over 56 games, second in team scoring to Teemu Laine. Spending the 2008–09 season with EC Red Bull Salzburg in the Austrian Hockey League, Sweatt scored 36 points over 52 games, second among team defensemen to Mario Scalzo.

In the off-season, he signed as a free agent to a one-year contract with Latvian club Dinamo Riga of the Kontinental Hockey League on July 13, 2009. He took a break from club play in November 2009, making his second appearance with the United States national select team for the Deutschland Cup. Returning to Dinamo, Sweatt was released from his KHL contract after a slow start to the 2009–10 season, recording 7 points in 37 games. Sweatt returned to TPS on January 18, 2010, and completed the regular season with 16 points in 21 SM-liiga games. In the playoffs, he added 13 points over 15 games, helping TPS win the Kanada-malja as league champions. For his efforts, he was named to the SM-liiga All-Star Team and also won the Pekka Rautakallio trophy as the league's best defenseman.

Returning to North America, Sweatt signed a one-year contract with the Vancouver Canucks on May 31, 2010. Nearly three months later, the Canucks also signed Sweatt's brother, Bill, from Colorado College. Following the pre-season, the Canucks assigned both Sweatt brothers to their AHL affiliate, the Manitoba Moose. Joining the Moose, Lee and Bill became the first pair of brothers in the team's history to play for the club at the same time. After recording 14 points in 41 AHL games, the Canucks recalled him on January 23, 2011. Filling in for injured defenseman Alex Edler, he made his NHL debut three days later against the Nashville Predators. He scored his first NHL goal that night, a game-winner in the third period against goaltender Pekka Rinne; the Canucks won the game 2–1. The following shift, he blocked a shot from Predators defenseman Shea Weber with his foot; a post-game X-ray diagnosed him with severe bruising. After resting the foot over the All-Star break, he played in two more games for the Canucks, before being reassigned to the Moose. On the morning of his scheduled flight back to Manitoba, he blocked another shot during a Canucks practice, breaking his foot. Sweatt was consequently retained on the NHL team's roster and placed on the long-term injured reserve list (injured players are not eligible to be sent down to the minors). Unable to skate on his injured foot until mid-June, Sweatt was sidelined for the remainder of the season.

Set to become a restricted free agent in the off-season, Sweatt did not receive a qualifying offer from the Canucks, making him an unrestricted free agent on July 1, 2011. Ten days into his free agency, he signed a two-year, two-way contract with the Ottawa Senators. However, on August 12, 2011, Sweatt retired prior to playing for the Senators organization.

=== Inline hockey ===
Sweatt began playing inline hockey at the age of eight to improve his skating for ice hockey. He began competing in the IIHF InLine Hockey World Championships with the United States national team in 2002. Playing seven straight years in the annual tournament, Sweatt won two gold (2004, 2006), one silver (2009) and two bronze medals (2003, 2005). At the 2008 IIHF InLine World Championships in Slovakia, Sweatt was named the tournament's Best Defenseman. He registered four goals and four assists in six games, ranking ninth among tournament defensemen in scoring, as the United States finished fourth in the competition, losing to Germany in the bronze medal game.

== Playing style ==
Sweatt is known as an offensive defenseman, possessing a good shot and a tendency to join plays deep in the opposing zone. He has played the role of powerplay "quarterback" on teams throughout his career – controlling the play by either passing or shooting the puck. Defensively, he is known to play aggressively, hitting opposing players. Due to his offensive capabilities at a comparatively small size for a defenseman at 5 feet and 9 inches, he has been compared to former NHL player Brian Rafalski.

== Personal life ==
Sweatt was born in Elburn, Illinois, a village west of Chicago. He played minor hockey with his younger brother Bill Sweatt, in Highland Park, Illinois. In addition to hockey, Sweatt played football as a child, following after his father.

While enrolled at the Colorado College, Sweatt maintained a grade point average (GPA) of at least 3.0 while majoring in mathematical economics, qualifying for the WCHA All-Academic Team as a sophomore, junior, and senior hockey player (freshmen are not eligible for the distinction). In his junior year, he was honored as a co-recipient of the Paul Markovich Award as the Colorado College Tigers' top student-athlete. He also received WCHA Student-Athlete of the Year honors after graduating with a 3.8 GPA in 2007.

In an interview with CBC Sports, Sweatt explained the reason for his retirement. Sweatt intends to work as a financial advisor and expects to make more money than if he were playing in the AHL. "I didn't need to prove myself all over again. I didn't want to be a bubble guy again. I didn't want to be the guy in the still living the dream at age 30 and sacrificing my goals outside the game."

== Career statistics ==
=== Regular season and playoffs ===
			Regular season					Playoffs
Season	Team	League	GP	G	A	Pts	PIM	GP	G	A	Pts	PIM
2002–03	Chicago Steel	USHL	58	6	9	15	25	—	—	—	—	—
2003–04	Colorado College	WCHA	37	4	12	16	20	—	—	—	—	—
2004–05	Colorado College	WCHA	41	3	24	27	34	—	—	—	—	—
2005–06	Colorado College	WCHA	41	5	16	21	36	—	—	—	—	—
2006–07	Colorado College	WCHA	37	9	15	24	51	—	—	—	—	—
2006–07	San Antonio Rampage	AHL	11	0	1	1	8	—	—	—	—	—
2007–08	TPS	SM-l	56	15	18	33	42	2	0	0	0	2
2008–09	EC Red Bull Salzburg	EBEL	52	10	26	36	99	12	2	4	6	14
2009–10	Dinamo Riga	KHL	37	2	5	7	18	—	—	—	—	—
2009–10	TPS	SM-l	21	9	7	16	8	15	7	6	13	8
2010–11	Manitoba Moose	AHL	41	5	9	14	18	—	—	—	—	—
2010–11	Vancouver Canucks	NHL	3	1	1	2	2	—	—	—	—	—
SM-l totals			93	24	25	49	50	17	7	6	13	10
KHL totals			37	2	5	7	18	—	—	—	—	—
NHL totals			3	1	1	2	2	—	—	—	—	—

=== International (InLine) ===
Year	Team	Event	GP	G	A	Pts	PIM
2008	United States	InLine WC	6	4	4	8	1.5
Int'l InLine totals			6	4	4	8	1.5

== Awards ==
Award	Year
All-WCHA Academic Team	2005, 2006, 2007
WCHA Student-Athlete of the Year	2007
All-WCHA Third Team	2007
IIHF InLine Hockey World Championship Best Defenseman	2008
Kanada-malja (SM-liiga champions; with TPS)	2010
Pekka Rautakallio trophy (SM-liiga best defenseman)	2010
SM-liiga All-Star Team	2010

Awards and achievements
Preceded by Markus Seikola	Pekka Rautakallio trophy (SM-liiga's best defenseman); 2010	Succeeded by Sami Vatanen
Preceded by Ted O'Leary	WCHA Student-Athlete of the Year; 2006–07	Succeeded by Joel Hanson
