= Derek Shybunka =

Canadian ice hockey player

- Born: September 25, 1970 (age 55) Edmonton, Alberta, Canada
- Height: 5 ft 10 in (178 cm)
- Weight: 172 lb (78 kg; 12 st 4 lb)
- Position: Goaltender
- Played for: CHL; Tulsa Oilers; WPHL; New Mexico Scorpions; Waco Wizards
- NHL draft: Undrafted
- Playing career: 1996–1998

Derek Shybunka (born September 25, 1970) is a Canadian former professional ice hockey and inline hockey goaltender.

Shybunka played with the Canadian men's national team at the 2008 IIHF Men's InLine Hockey World Championship where he selected as the tournament's best goaltender.

== Awards and honours ==
Award	Year
IIHF InLine Hockey World Championship Best Goalkeeper	2008
