= 2008 IIHF InLine Hockey World Championship Division I Qualification =

International sports tournament

The 2008 IIHF InLine Hockey World Championship Division I Qualification tournament was held in the summer of 2007.

== European qualifier ==
2007 IIHF InLine Hockey World Championship Division I European Qualification
Tournament details
- Host country: Bulgaria
- Venue: 1 (in 1 host city)
- Dates: July 27–28
- Teams: 4

The 2007 European Qualification tournament was held in July 2007. The winner of this tournament, Bulgaria, advanced to the next level of the IIHF World Championship, which is the Division I tournament. Games were played at the Winter Palace of Sports in Sofia, Bulgaria.

Four participating teams were placed in one group. After playing a round-robin, the top team advances to the 2008 Division I tournament.

=== Standings ===
Team	Pld	W	OTW	OTL	L	GF	GA	GD	Pts
Bulgaria	2	1	1	0	0	13	11	+2	5
Croatia	2	1	0	0	1	13	7	+6	3
Israel	2	0	0	1	1	9	17	−8	1

=== Fixtures ===
July 2007	Bulgaria	5 - 4	Croatia

July 2007	Bulgaria	8 - 7 (SO)	Israel

July 2007	Croatia	9 - 2	Israel

== See also ==
- 2008 IIHF Inline Hockey World Championship
- 2008 IIHF InLine Hockey World Championship Division I
