= Richard Kapuš =

Slovak ice hockey player

- Born: February 9, 1973 (age 52); Bratislava, Czechoslovakia
- Height: 6 ft 0 in (183 cm)
- Weight: 203 lb (92 kg; 14 st 7 lb)
- Position: Centre
- Shot: Left
- Played for: HC Slovan Bratislava; HC Ocelari Trinec; Lulea HF; Avangard Omsk; Metallurg Novokuznetsk; Lada Togliatti; HC Banska Bystrica; HC Berkut-Kyiv
- National team: Slovakia
- NHL draft: Undrafted
- Playing career: 1990–2012

Richard Kapuš
Medal record

Men's Inline Hockey

World Championships
Silver medal – second place	2008 - Bratislava	1st Silver

Richard Kapuš (born February 9, 1973) is a Slovak former professional ice hockey centre.

== Career ==
Kapuš spent the majority of his career playing in the Slovak Extraliga for HC Slovan Bratislava. He also played in the Czech Extraliga for HC Oceláři Třinec, the Swedish Elitserien for Luleå HF and the Russian Superleague/Kontinental Hockey League for Avangard Omsk, HC Metallurg Novokuznetsk and HC Lada Togliatti.

He also played with the Slovak national ice hockey team in the 1998, 1999, 2000, 2003 and 2004 Men's Ice Hockey World Championships. He won the silver medal with Slovakia in 2000 championship and the bronze medal in the 2003 championship. He was also a member of the silver medal winning Slovakia national inline team competing in the 2008 Men's World Inline Hockey Championships.

== Career statistics ==
=== Regular season and playoffs ===
			Regular season					Playoffs
Season	Team	League	GP	G	A	Pts	PIM	GP	G	A	Pts	PIM
1990–91	HC Slovan Bratislava	TCH	2	0	0	0	0	—	—	—	—	—
1991–92	HC Slovan Bratislava	TCH	4	0	1	1	0	—	—	—	—	—
1992–93	HC Slovan Bratislava	TCH	40	10	13	23	—	—	—	—	—	—
1994–95	HC Slovan Bratislava	SVK	45	16	23	39	57	9	4	2	6	8
1995–96	HC Slovan Bratislava	SVK	47	17	20	37	51	—	—	—	—	—
1996–97	HC Slovan Bratislava	SVK	46	20	26	46	46	—	—	—	—	—
1997–98	HC Slovan Bratislava	SVK	47	25	27	52	30	—	—	—	—	—
1998–99	HC Slovan Bratislava	SVK	49	21	28	49	75	—	—	—	—	—
1999–2000	HC Slovan Bratislava	SVK	56	15	29	44	42	8	4	5	9	6
2000–01	HC Oceláři Třinec	ELH	44	9	12	21	49	—	—	—	—	—
2001–02	HC Slovan Bratislava	SVK	52	11	21	32	48	—	—	—	—	—
2002–03	HC Slovan Bratislava	SVK	42	19	19	38	81	13	7	14	21	44
2003–04	Luleå HF	SEL	14	4	5	9	2	5	1	1	2	12
2003–04	Avangard Omsk	RSL	29	2	10	12	20	—	—	—	—	—
2004–05	HC Slovan Bratislava	SVK	52	17	37	54	52	17	4	8	12	52
2005–06	Metallurg Novokuznetsk	RSL	49	8	13	21	44	3	1	0	1	2
2005–06	Metallurg–2 Novokuznetsk	RUS.3	2	2	1	3	0	—	—	—	—	—
2006–07	Metallurg Novokuznetsk	RSL	49	9	11	20	34	3	0	1	1	0
2007–08	HC Slovan Bratislava	SVK	51	15	29	44	58	18	4	12	16	38
2008–09	Metallurg Novokuznetsk	KHL	55	10	18	28	57	—	—	—	—	—
2009–10	Metallurg Novokuznetsk	KHL	35	1	7	8	18	—	—	—	—	—
2009–10	Lada Togliatti	KHL	4	0	0	0	0	—	—	—	—	—
2010–11	HC Slovan Bratislava	SVK	50	8	32	40	36	7	1	0	1	20
2011–12	HC ’05 Banská Bystrica	SVK	16	1	3	4	4	—	—	—	—	—
2011–12	HC Berkut-Kyiv	UKR	11	5	6	11	6	—	—	—	—	—
SVK totals			553	185	294	479	580	72	24	41	65	168

=== International ===
Year	Team	Event	Result	GP	G	A	Pts	PIM
1991	Czechoslovakia	EJC	1st place, gold medalist(s)	5	3	0	3	2
1993	Czechoslovakia	WJC	3rd place, bronze medalist(s)	7	2	2	4	10
1998	Slovakia	WC	7th	6	0	0	0	0
1999	Slovakia	WC	7th	6	1	2	3	14
2000	Slovakia	WC	2nd place, silver medalist(s)	9	1	5	6	0
2002	Slovakia	OG	13th	4	0	1	1	0
2003	Slovakia	WC	3rd place, bronze medalist(s)	9	3	1	4	0
2004	Slovakia	WC	4th	9	0	1	1	6
2006	Slovakia	OG	5th	6	0	2	2	4
2006	Slovakia	WC	8th	7	3	2	5	4
2007	Slovakia	WC	6th	7	3	5	8	2
Junior totals				12	5	2	7	12
Senior totals				63	11	19	30	30
