= Martin Thelander =

Swedish ice hockey player

- Born: 15 May 1981 (age 45) Karlstad, Sweden
- Height: 6 ft 0 in (183 cm)
- Weight: 185 lb (84 kg; 13 st 3 lb)
- Position: Defence
- Shot: left
- Played for: Färjestad; Bofors; Södertälje; Storhamar Dragons; Herlev Hornets<brBIK Karlskoga
- Playing career: 2000–2016

Martin Thelander (born 15 May 1981, in Sweden) is a professional Swedish ice hockey player. He is currently playing for the BIK Karlskoga in the Swedish HockeyAllsvenskan. His former teams are Färjestad, Bofors, Södertälje, Storhamar Dragons and Herlev Hornets.

Thelander was a member of the 2008 Swedish national inline hockey team that competed at the 2008 Men's World Inline Hockey Championships in Bratislava.

== Career statistics ==
			Regular season					Playoffs
Season	Team	League	GP	G	A	Pts	PIM	GP	G	A	Pts	PIM
1999–00	Färjestad BK J20	J20 SuperElit	35	6	9	15	26	—	—	—	—	—
2000–01	Färjestad BK J20	J20 SuperElit	3	1	1	2	26	—	—	—	—	—
2000–01	Bofors IK	Allsvenskan	28	2	2	4	24	—	—	—	—	—
2001–02	Bofors IK	Allsvenskan	46	3	8	11	34	10	2	0	2	8
2002–03	Bofors IK	Allsvenskan	42	4	4	8	52	2	0	1	1	0
2003–04	Bofors IK	Allsvenskan	45	2	9	11	76	5	1	1	2	10
2004–05	Bofors IK	Allsvenskan	30	2	4	6	28	5	0	3	3	8
2005–06	Färjestad BK	Elitserien	29	0	2	2	53	—	—	—	—	—
2005–06	Bofors IK	HockeyAllsvenskan	16	2	3	5	52	10	0	1	1	33
2006–07	Södertälje SK	HockeyAllsvenskan	44	6	10	16	62	10	0	0	0	0
2007–08	Storhamar Hockey	Norway	43	4	16	20	88	16	0	3	3	70
2008–09	Herlev Hornets	Denmark	42	6	16	22	76	—	—	—	—	—
2009–10	Bofors IK	HockeyAllsvenskan	42	5	13	18	38	1	0	0	0	0
2010–11	Bofors IK	HockeyAllsvenskan	45	5	15	20	60	—	—	—	—	—
2011–12	Bofors IK	HockeyAllsvenskan	46	8	14	22	24	10	0	1	1	12
2012–13	BIK Karlskoga	HockeyAllsvenskan	48	4	12	16	64	6	0	2	2	6
2013–14	BIK Karlskoga	HockeyAllsvenskan	51	5	19	24	24	6	1	2	3	0
2014–15	BIK Karlskoga	HockeyAllsvenskan	28	3	11	14	12	5	1	1	2	25
2015–16	BIK Karlskoga	HockeyAllsvenskan	42	3	13	16	18	—	—	—	—	—
Elitserien totals			29	0	2	2	53	—	—	—	—	—
Norway totals			43	4	16	20	88	16	0	3	3	70
Denmark totals			42	6	16	22	76	—	—	—	—	—
Allsvenskan totals			191	13	27	40	214	22	3	5	8	18
HockeyAllsvenskan totals			362	41	110	151	354	48	2	7	9	76
