= Bill Sweatt =

American ice hockey player

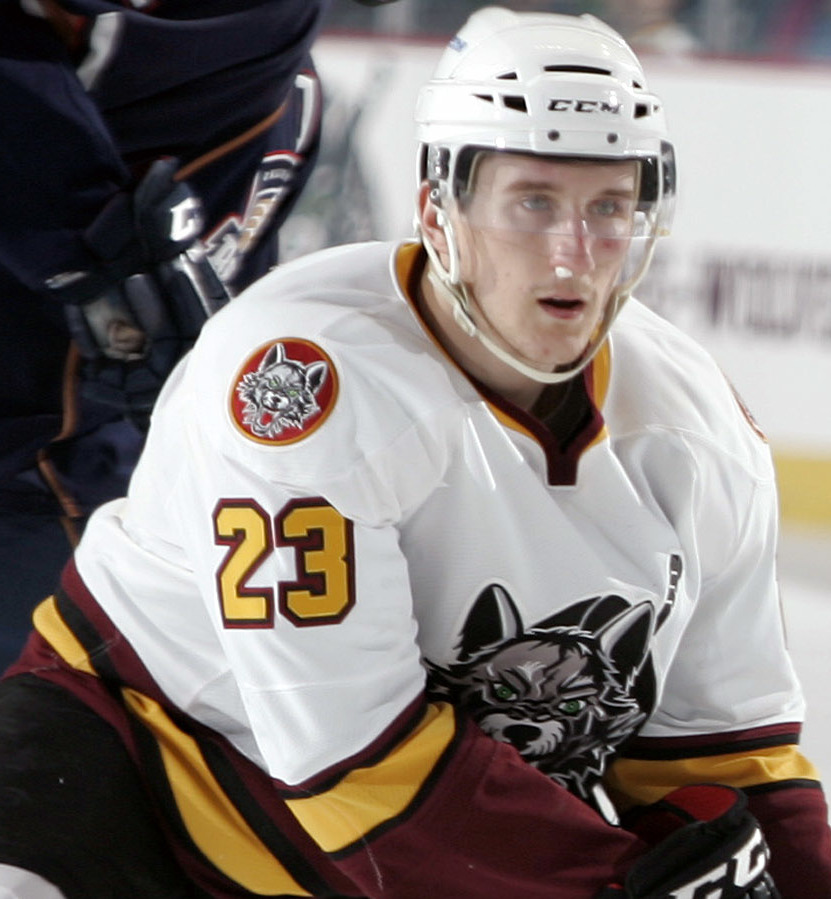
- Sweatt with the Chicago Wolves in 2012
- Born: September 21, 1988 (age 37) Elburn, Illinois, U.S.
- Height: 6 ft 0 in (183 cm)
- Weight: 198 lb (90 kg; 14 st 2 lb)
- Position: Left wing
- Shot: Left
- Played for: Vancouver Canucks; Brynäs IF; Luleå HF; HV71
- NHL draft: 38th overall, 2007; Chicago Blackhawks
- Playing career: 2010–2018

William Joseph Sweatt (born September 21, 1988) is an American former professional ice hockey left winger. He played in the National Hockey League (NHL) with the Vancouver Canucks before playing in the Swedish Hockey League (SHL).

Sweatt played junior hockey with the United States National Development Program and college hockey with the Colorado College Tigers. Selected 38th overall in the 2007 NHL entry draft by the Chicago Blackhawks, he became a free agent after going unsigned by the club. In 2010, he signed with the Canucks. As a roller hockey player, Sweatt has competed internationally with Team USA, winning a gold medal at the 2006 World InLine Championships. His older brother Lee Sweatt is a former hockey player; the two played with each other with the Colorado College Tigers and the Manitoba Moose.

== Early life ==
Sweatt was born in Elburn, Illinois, a village west of Chicago. He played minor ice hockey with his older brother Lee, in Highland Park, Illinois. As a youth, he played in the 2002 Quebec International Pee-Wee Hockey Tournament with the Chicago Young Americans team. His father was a former football player, while his mother was a hockey fan. Growing up, the family lived in the country and had a paved basement, where the brothers played roller hockey.

== Playing career ==
Sweatt joined the U.S. National Under-18 Team in 2004–05. After two seasons with the program, he joined the college ranks with the Colorado College Tigers of the Western Collegiate Hockey Association (WCHA). During his freshman year, Sweatt skated alongside Lee, who was finishing up his college career with Colorado as a senior defenceman. Following a 26-point effort over 30 games, Sweatt was selected 38th overall in the 2007 NHL entry draft by the Chicago Blackhawks. He returned to Colorado to complete his NCAA career, which culminated in a college career-high 15 goals, 18 assists, and 33 points over 39 games as a senior in 2009–10.

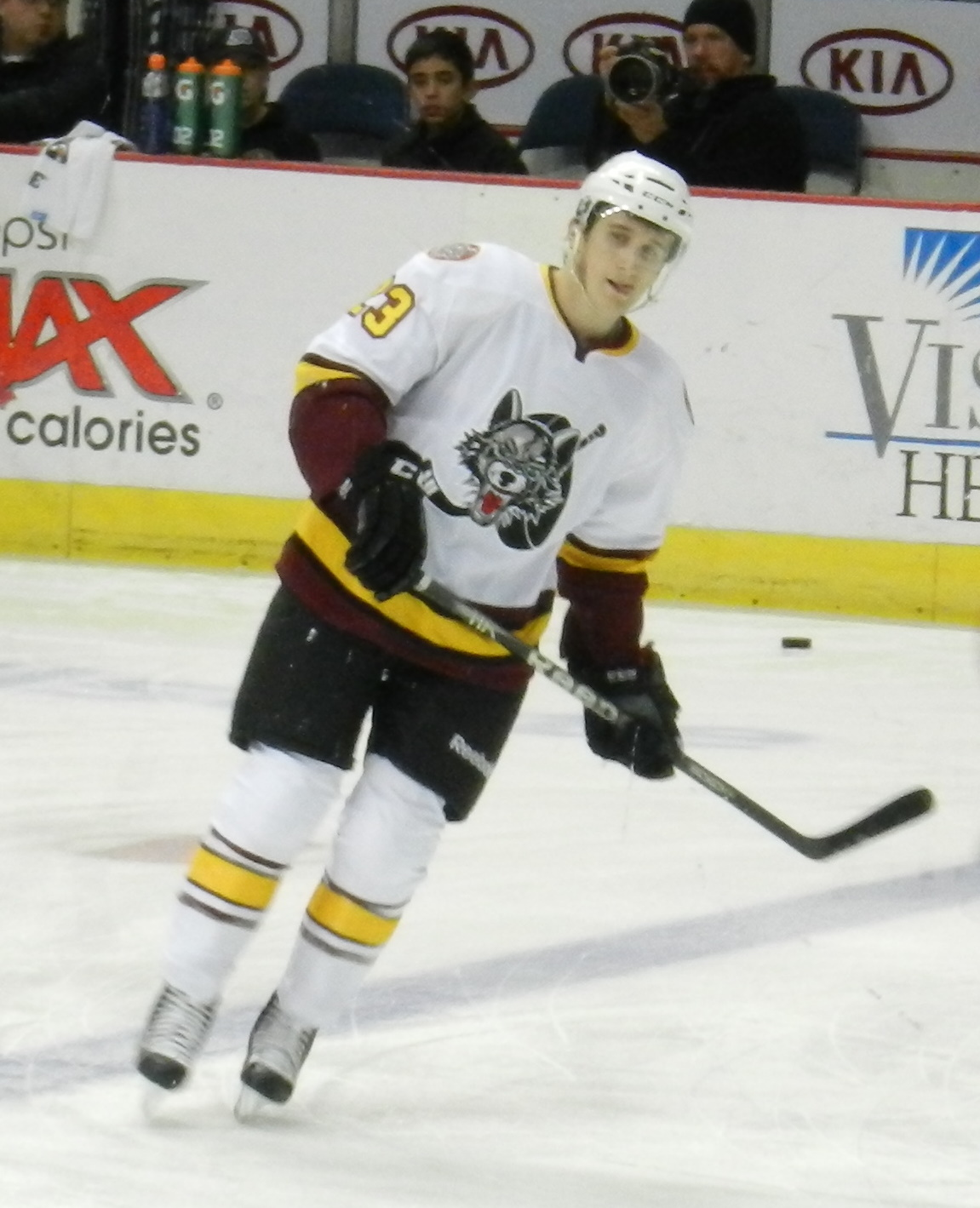
Sweatt playing for the Chicago Wolves.

In the off-season, Sweatt was traded from the Blackhawks to the Toronto Maple Leafs on June 30, 2010, along with forward Kris Versteeg. Opting not to sign with Toronto, he became a free agent on August 16, 2010. Three days later, he signed a three-year, entry-level contract with the Vancouver Canucks worth US$2.7 million, plus performance bonuses. Sweatt joined his brother Lee in the Canucks organization, who had been signed by the team three months prior.

Following the pre-season, the Canucks assigned both Sweatt brothers to their American Hockey League(AHL) affiliate the Manitoba Moose. Together, they became the first pair of brothers to play at the same time for the franchise. Moose head coach Claude Noel described Sweatt in his professional rookie season as a physical player who can forecheck quickly and make plays. Sweatt recorded 46 points (19 goals and 27 assists) over 80 games, ranking second in team-scoring (12 behind winger Sergei Shirokov), as well as ninth among league rookies. During the off-season, Lee was left unsigned by the Canucks organization, splitting the brothers up. Despite signing with the Ottawa Senators, Lee announced his retirement shortly thereafter.

During the Canucks' 2011 training camp, Sweatt was injured during a prospects tournament in Penticton, British Columbia, causing him to miss the team's first two preseason games in September. After being assigned to the Chicago Wolves, the Canucks' new AHL affiliate, to start the season, he received his first NHL call-up on December 7, 2011. Making his NHL debut the following night against the Montreal Canadiens, he registered two shots on goal and one hit in six minutes and eighteen seconds of ice time; Vancouver won the game 4–3. On March 31, 2013, Sweatt and Nicklas Jensen were recalled from the Wolves by the Canucks.

On July 9, 2013, with his rights still owned by the Canucks, Sweatt signed his first European contract on a one-year contract in Sweden with Brynäs IF of the Swedish Hockey League (SHL).

Sweatt played the next five seasons in the SHL, opting to end his eight-year professional career and return to North America, following the 2017–18 season with HV71.

== International play ==
Medal record

Representing United States

World Junior Championships
Bronze medal – third place	2007 Sweden	

IIHF World U18 Championships
Gold medal – first place	2006 Sweden	

InLine Hockey World Championship
Gold medal – first place	2006 Hungary	

Sweatt was named Top Forward at the IIHF Under-18 World Championships in 2006, where the United States won gold. He also participated in the 2007 World Junior Ice Hockey Championships for the US, coming home with a bronze medal. While playing roller hockey, Sweatt won a gold medal at the 2006 World InLine Championships.

== Career statistics ==
=== Regular season and playoffs ===
			Regular season					Playoffs
Season	Team	League	GP	G	A	Pts	PIM	GP	G	A	Pts	PIM
2004–05	U.S. National Under-18 Team	NAHL	41	7	9	16	12	—	—	—	—	—
2005–06	U.S. National Under-18 Team	NAHL	17	10	15	25	4	—	—	—	—	—
2006–07	Colorado College	WCHA	30	9	17	26	18	—	—	—	—	—
2007–08	Colorado College	WCHA	37	10	17	27	38	—	—	—	—	—
2008–09	Colorado College	WCHA	37	12	11	23	28	—	—	—	—	—
2009–10	Colorado College	WCHA	39	15	18	33	18	—	—	—	—	—
2010–11	Manitoba Moose	AHL	80	19	27	46	28	14	1	5	6	2
2011–12	Chicago Wolves	AHL	71	16	18	34	24	5	1	1	2	0
2011–12	Vancouver Canucks	NHL	2	0	0	0	0	—	—	—	—	—
2012–13	Chicago Wolves	AHL	66	15	21	36	12	—	—	—	—	—
2012–13	Vancouver Canucks	NHL	1	0	0	0	0	—	—	—	—	—
2013–14	Brynäs IF	SHL	55	16	13	29	26	5	1	1	2	2
2014–15	Brynäs IF	SHL	54	19	22	41	36	7	0	4	4	4
2015–16	Luleå HF	SHL	24	4	2	6	49	—	—	—	—	—
2016–17	Luleå HF	SHL	49	15	7	22	43	2	1	1	2	0
2017–18	HV71	SHL	30	8	7	15	12	2	1	0	1	0
NHL totals			3	0	0	0	0	—	—	—	—	—
SHL totals			212	62	51	113	166	16	3	6	9	6

=== International ===
Year	Team	Event	Result	GP	G	A	Pts	PIM
2005	United States	U17	5th	5	2	2	4	8
2006	United States	WJC18	1st place, gold medalist(s)	6	5	2	7	4
2007	United States	WJC	3rd place, bronze medalist(s)	7	1	1	2	0
2008	United States	WJC	4th	6	0	1	1	0
Junior totals				24	8	6	14	12
