= Derek Kern (ice hockey) =

American roller hockey and ice hockey player

- Born: September 1, 1978 (age 47) Smithtown, New York, U.S.
- Height: 5 ft 8 in (173 cm)
- Weight: 165 lb (75 kg; 11 st 11 lb)
- Position: Center
- Shot: Left
- Played for: Bossier-Shreveport Mudbugs (CHL); Winston-Salem T-Birds (SEHL); Kansas City Outlaws (UHL); Brooklyn Aces (EPHL)
- NHL draft: Undrafted
- Playing career: 2002–2010

Derek Kern (born September 1, 1978) is an American former professional roller hockey and ice hockey player. Kern was a member of the United States national inline hockey team that competed at the 2007 and 2008 IIHF Men's InLine Hockey World Championships. Kern played professional roller hockey with the Mission Snipers.

== Early life and education ==
Kern was born in Smithtown, New York. Prior to turning professional, he attended the State University of New York at Oswego, where he played four seasons.

== Career ==
Kern played the 2004–05 season with the Kansas City Outlaws of the United Hockey League. On January 24, 2009, Kern was signed by the Brooklyn Aces of the EPHL. Since retiring from hockey, Kern has served in the New York City Fire Department.
