= Márton Vas =

Hungarian ice hockey player

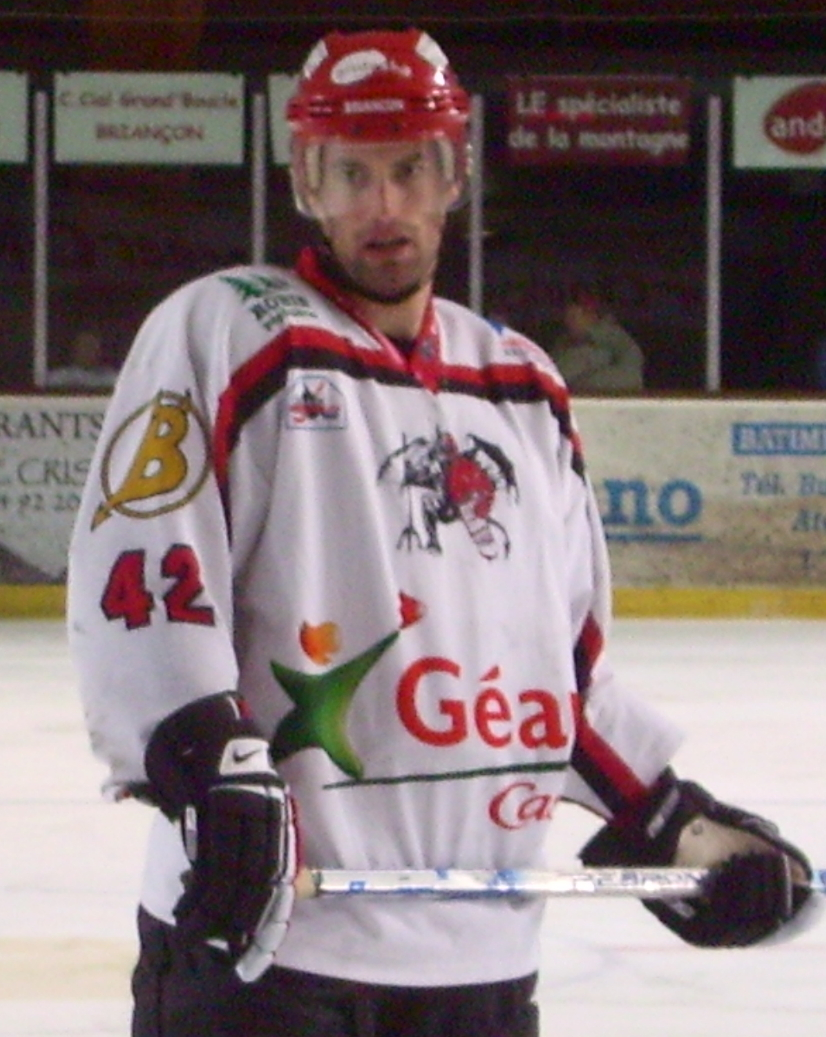
- Born: March 2, 1980 (age 46) Dunaújváros, Hungary
- Height: 6 ft 2 in (188 cm)
- Weight: 202 lb (92 kg; 14 st 6 lb)
- Position: Defenceman / Forward
- Shot: Left
- Serie A team Former teams: HC Fassa; Dunaújváros; Vänersborgs HC; Grums IK; Diables Rouges de Briançon; Alba Volán Székesfehérvár; Löwen Frankfurt; HC Fassa; EHC Freiburg
- National team: Hungary
- Playing career: 1995–2017

Márton Vas (born March 2, 1980) is a Hungarian former professional ice hockey defenceman. He was a member of the Hungarian national team. His brother, János Vas, is also a professional ice hockey player and member of the Hungarian national team.

== Career ==
Vas, who is Jewish, made his senior debut at the age of 15 for his hometown club Dunaferr SE and a year later already celebrated his first Hungarian championship success. The forward got a chance to try himself in the overseas in 1997. First he moved to the United States to play for Flagstaff Mountaineers in the Western States Hockey League, where he won the title right in his first year. Vas started the next season by Canadian club Hawkesbury Hawks, with them he again went triumphant, winning the Central Canada Hockey League, however, failed to progress to the national final after finishing only second in the Fred Page Cup.

Vas spent another year in Canada before moved back to his native Hungary to play for his former club Dunaferr. He spent six years in Hungary, interrupted by two short spells in Swedish lower league clubs Vänersborgs HC and Grums IK. In 2006 he moved abroad again and joined previous year's French Cup winners Diables Rouges de Briançon, where he played together with fellow Hungarians Balázs Ladányi and Viktor Szélig. While in France, Vas did not manage to win any trophy, however, he finished runner-up two times in the Ligue Magnus and the Coupe de la Ligue. Briancon, to cut their expenditures, let the forward go in the summer of 2009, and Vas joined Alba Volán Székesfehérvár.

== Career statistics ==
=== Austrian Hockey League ===
	Seasons	GP	Goals	Assists	Pts	PIM
Regular season	2	107	39	49	88	52
Playoffs	1	5	3	1	4	4

== See also ==
- List of select Jewish ice hockey players
