= Jiří Polanský =

Czech ice hockey player

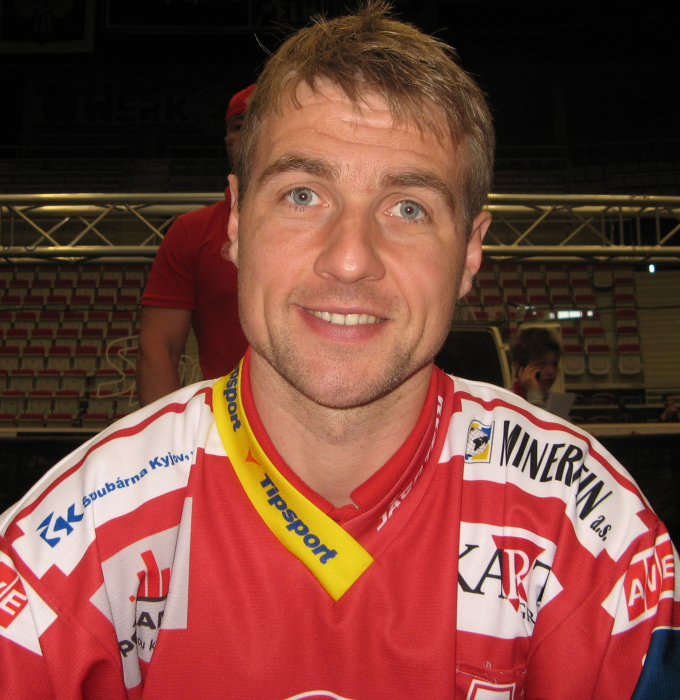
- Born: December 18, 1981 (age 43) Brno, Czechoslovakia
- Height: 5 ft 10 in (178 cm)
- Weight: 183 lb (83 kg; 13 st 1 lb)
- Position: Forward
- Shot: Right
- Played for: HC Kometa Brno; HC Oceláři Třinec; MsHK Zilina; HC Havířov Panthers; HK Jestřábi Prostějov; EHC Olten
- National team: Czech Republic
- NHL draft: Undrafted
- Playing career: 2000–2020

Jiří Polanský (born December 18, 1981) is a Czech former professional ice hockey player. He played with HC Oceláři Třinec in the Czech Extraliga during the 2010–11 Czech Extraliga season.
