= Jozef Ondrejka =

Slovak ice hockey player

- Born: 20 May 1983 (age 42) Trnava, Czechoslovakia
- Height: 6 ft 1 in (185 cm)
- Position: Goaltender
- Slovak Extraliga team: HC Slovan Bratislava
- Playing career: 1998–present

Jozef Ondrejka (born 20 May 1983) is a Slovak former professional ice hockey player who played with HC Slovan Bratislava in the Slovak Extraliga.
