= Martin Gálik =

Slovak ice hockey player

- Born: June 7, 1979 (age 46) Bratislava, Czechoslovakia
- Height: 6 ft 1 in (185 cm)
- Weight: 203 lb (92 kg; 14 st 7 lb)
- Position: Left wing
- Shot: Left
- Played for: HC Slovan Bratislava; Greensboro Generals; Pee Dee Pride; MsHK Zilina; HC Energie Karlovy Vary; MHC Martin; Fehérvár AV19; HK Nitra; KLH Chomutov; HKM Zvolen; SHK 37 Piestany; HK Levice
- National team: Slovakia
- NHL draft: Undrafted
- Playing career: 1996–2015

Martin Gálik is a Slovak professional ice hockey player who played with HC Slovan Bratislava in the Slovak Extraliga.

== Career statistics ==
			Regular season					Playoffs
Season	Team	League	GP	G	A	Pts	PIM	GP	G	A	Pts	PIM
1995–96	HC Slovan Bratislava U20	Slovak U20	45	11	12	23	30	—	—	—	—	—
1996–97	HC Slovan Bratislava U20	Slovak U20	48	22	25	47	48	—	—	—	—	—
1996–97	HC Slovan Bratislava	Slovak	10	0	2	2	2	—	—	—	—	—
1997–98	Sault Ste. Marie Greyhounds	OHL	54	22	15	37	18	—	—	—	—	—
1997–98	HC Slovan Bratislava U20	Slovak U20	2	2	0	2	0	—	—	—	—	—
1998–99	Sault Ste. Marie Greyhounds	OHL	61	23	27	50	24	5	0	3	3	2
1999–00	Greensboro Generals	ECHL	58	11	18	29	20	—	—	—	—	—
2000–01	Greensboro Generals	ECHL	21	3	6	9	8	—	—	—	—	—
2000–01	Pee Dee Pride	ECHL	28	0	3	3	12	—	—	—	—	—
2001–02	MsHK Zilina	Slovak	42	9	9	18	126	—	—	—	—	—
2002–03	MsHK Zilina	Slovak	42	10	17	27	20	—	—	—	—	—
2002–03	HC Slovan Bratislava	Slovak	5	0	1	1	2	—	—	—	—	—
2003–04	MsHK Zilina	Slovak	54	9	16	25	48	—	—	—	—	—
2004–05	MsHK Zilina	Slovak	54	8	12	20	40	5	0	0	0	16
2005–06	MsHK Zilina	Slovak	54	8	18	26	28	15	1	2	3	10
2006–07	MsHK Zilina	Slovak	37	13	10	23	79	—	—	—	—	—
2006–07	HC Energie Karlovy Vary	Czech	4	1	0	1	2	—	—	—	—	—
2006–07	MHC Martin	Slovak	8	3	1	4	8	4	0	1	1	4
2007–08	Alba Volan Szekesfehervar	EBEL	4	0	2	2	16	—	—	—	—	—
2007–08	Alba Volan Szekesfehervar	Hungary	1	0	1	1	0	—	—	—	—	—
2007–08	HK Nitra	Slovak	36	17	12	29	128	—	—	—	—	—
2007–08	KLH Chomutov	Czech2	4	2	1	3	4	12	2	1	3	8
2008–09	HK Nitra	Slovak	46	12	18	30	52	—	—	—	—	—
2008–09	HKM Zvolen	Slovak	9	2	5	7	18	13	1	3	4	4
2009–10	HKM Zvolen	Slovak	32	8	6	14	22	—	—	—	—	—
2009–10	MsHK Zilina	Slovak	14	1	5	6	10	—	—	—	—	—
2010–11	MHC Martin	Slovak	25	1	7	8	14	—	—	—	—	—
2010–11	SHK 37 Piestany	Slovak2	10	2	0	2	10	18	4	1	5	42
2011–12	HK Levice	Slovak3	18	12	11	23	78	—	—	—	—	—
2012–13	HK Levice	Slovak3	3	1	3	4	16	—	—	—	—	—
2013–14	HK Levice	Slovak3	1	1	1	2	0	—	—	—	—	—
2014–15	HK Levice	Slovak3	1	3	0	3	0	—	—	—	—	—
ECHL totals			107	14	27	41	40	—	—	—	—	—
Slovak totals			468	101	139	240	597	42	3	6	9	36
