= Itan Chavira =

American inline hockey player

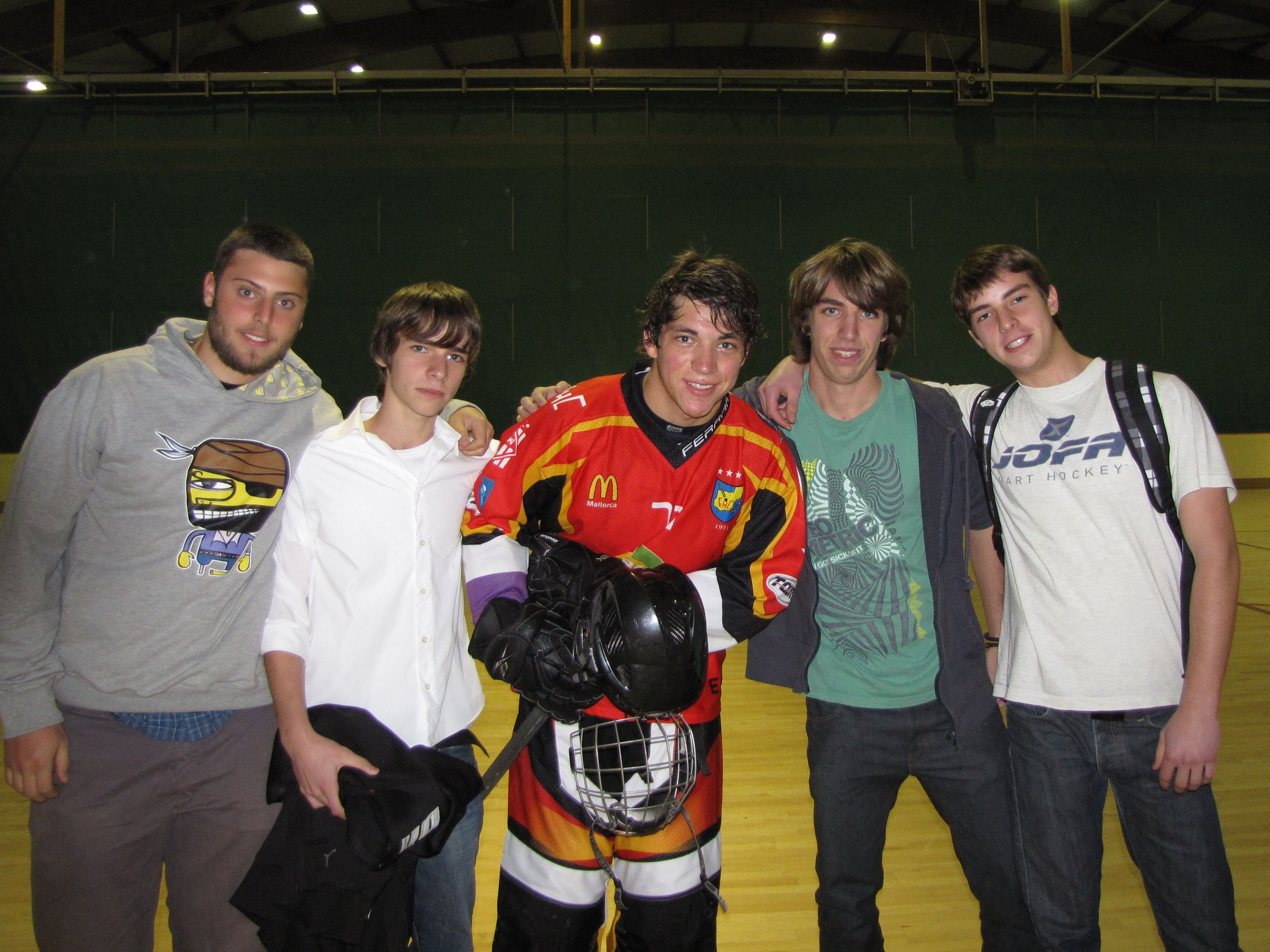
- November 2009
- Born: November 2, 1987 (age 38) Big Bear, California, U.S.
- Height: 5 ft 8 in (173 cm)
- Weight: 169 lb (77 kg; 12 st 1 lb)
- Position: Forward
- Shoots: Right
- AIHL team Former teams: Ripon Savage; Ontario Reign (ECHL); Yarmouth Mariners (MJAHL); Charlottetown Abbies (MJAHL); LA Pama Cyclones (AIHL); Rethel (France); Espanya Hoquei Club (Spain); CPLV Dismeva Valladolid (Spain)
- NHL draft: Undrafted
- Playing career: 2008–present
Medal record
Men's roller inline hockey
Representing United States
World Games
Gold medal – first place	2013 Cali	Team

Itan Daniel Chavira (born November 2, 1987) is an American former minor league ice hockey forward currently playing for the USA National Inline Team and the Ripon Savage of American Inline Hockey League.

== Playing career ==
Chavira played junior hockey in the United States Hockey League (USHL) with the Ohio Junior Blue Jackets in 2006-2007. The following year, he played for the Charlottetown Abbies and the Yarmouth Mariners in the Maritime Junior A Hockey League and recorded a junior career-high 41 goals, 44 assists and 85 points, while the Mariners finished as the MJAHL Championship, before ending the season in the Fred Page Cup.

Chavira ended his junior hockey league career by turning pro with the Ontario Reign of the ECHL. However, Chavira only played 16 games, registering 2 goals and 4 assists.

== US National Inline Team ==
Chavira has been of member of the US National Inline team for the previous two World Championships. During the 2008 tournament, he finished tied for 5th in scoring in the tournament, recording 3 goals and 7 assists in 6 games, en route to a 4th-place finish.
