= Johan Olsson (ice hockey) =

Swedish professional ice hockey forward (born 1978)

- Born: 20 February 1978 (age 47) Karlstad, Sweden
- Height: 6 ft 0 in (183 cm)
- Weight: 181 lb (82 kg; 12 st 13 lb)
- Position: Left wing
- Shoots: Left
- GET-ligaen team Former teams: Stjernen; Färjestads BK; Mora IK; Tranås AIF; Bofors IK; Södertälje SK; Nordsjælland Cobras
- Playing career: 1997–present

Medal record

Men's inline hockey

World Championships
| Gold medal – first place | 2007 - Landshut | |
| Gold medal – first place | 2008 - Bratislava | |

Johan Olsson (born 20 February 1978) is a Swedish professional ice hockey forward currently playing for Stjernen of Norway's GET-ligaen

Olsson started his professional career with hometown club Färjestads BK and in his first season with the team, 1996/97, the team won the Swedish Championship. The following season, the team won the Championship again. But Olsson did not play many games in the two seasons and decided to leave to club and signed with the Norwegian club Stjernen. Olsson had a really good season in Norway, scoring 38 points in 44 games. That made some clubs in Sweden interested in him, and he signed with second league club Mora IK in the summer of 1999. But he only stayed for one year with Mora before he signed with Tranås AIF (also a second league club), but he was successful there too and left the club after one year. He then signed with his old club, Färjestad's fram team, Bofors IK of the second league. And finally, he had some success. For four years in a row, he was among the top scorers on the team. And in the summer of 2005, Färjestad wanted to give Olsson another chance in the highest league. But Olsson did not take the chance and had a disappointing season with only 6 points in 46 games in the regular season. In the playoffs, he only played 4 games, but he got a new gold medal when Färjestad won their seventh Swedish Championship. After the season, Färjestad did not want to give Olsson a new contract, and then he signed with Södertälje SK, who play in Allsvenskan, for the 2006/07 season.

During the 2006/07 Olsson helped Södertälje advance back to Elitserien. But after Olsson decided to leave Södertälje and he signed with Danish club Nordsjælland Cobras for the 2007/08 season. In 2008, Olsson returned to Stjernen.

Olsson was a member of the gold medal-winning Swedish men's national inline hockey teams at the 2007 Men's World Inline Hockey Championships and 2008 Men's World Inline Hockey Championships.

== Career statistics ==
| | | | Regular season | | | | | Playoffs | | | | | Qualification |
| Season | Team | League | GP | G | A | Pts | PIM | GP | G | A | Pts | PIM |
|---|---|---|---|---|---|---|---|---|---|---|---|---|---|---|---|---|---|
| 1996–97 | Färjestad | Elitserien | 2 | 0 | 0 | 0 | 0 | -- | -- | -- | -- | -- | -- | -- | -- | -- | -- |
| 1997–98 | Färjestad | Elitserien | 13 | 0 | 0 | 0 | 0 | 1 | 0 | 0 | 0 | 0 | -- | -- | -- | -- | -- |
| 1998–99 | Stjernen | GET-ligaen | 44 | 21 | 17 | 38 | 12 | -- | -- | -- | -- | -- | -- | -- | -- | -- | -- |
| 1999–00 | Mora | Allsvenskan | 30 | 7 | 4 | 11 | 4 | -- | -- | -- | -- | -- | -- | -- | -- | -- | -- |
| 2000–01 | Tranås | Allsvenskan | 40 | 5 | 6 | 11 | 6 | -- | -- | -- | -- | -- | -- | -- | -- | -- | -- |
| 2001–02 | Bofors | Allsvenskan | 45 | 8 | 10 | 18 | 18 | 6 | 1 | 3 | 4 | 0 | -- | -- | -- | -- | -- |
| 2001–02 | Bofors | Elitserien | -- | -- | -- | -- | -- | -- | -- | -- | -- | -- | 10 | 3 | 2 | 5 | 2 |
| 2002–03 | Bofors | Allsvenskan | 40 | 17 | 10 | 27 | 14 | 2 | 0 | 1 | 1 | 0 | -- | -- | -- | -- | -- |
| 2003–04 | Bofors | Allsvenskan | 46 | 17 | 14 | 31 | 8 | 5 | 4 | 1 | 5 | 2 | -- | -- | -- | -- | -- |
| 2004–05 | Bofors | Allsvenskan | 46 | 19 | 20 | 39 | 10 | 5 | 1 | 2 | 3 | 2 | -- | -- | -- | -- | -- |
| 2005–06 | Färjestad | Elitserien | 46 | 3 | 3 | 6 | 8 | 4 | 0 | 0 | 0 | 4 | -- | -- | -- | -- | -- |
| 2006–07 | Södertälje | Allsvenskan | 41 | 10 | 21 | 31 | 22 | 5 | 1 | 2 | 3 | 2 | -- | -- | -- | -- | -- |
| 2006–07 | Södertälje | Elitserien | -- | -- | -- | -- | -- | -- | -- | -- | -- | -- | 10 | 0 | 0 | 0 | 2 |
| 2007–08 | Nordsjælland Cobras | Oddset Ligaen |
| 2008–09 | Stjernen | GET-ligaen | 43 | 9 | 42 | 51 | 18 | 12 | 3 | 9 | 12 | 24 | -- | -- | -- | -- | -- |
| Elitserien totals | | | 61 | 3 | 3 | 6 | 8 | 5 | 0 | 0 | 0 | 4 | 20 | 3 | 2 | 5 | 4 |
| Allsvenskan totals | | | 291 | 83 | 85 | 168 | 82 | 18 | 6 | 7 | 13 | 4 | -- | -- | -- | -- | -- |
| GET-ligaen totals | | | 87 | 30 | 59 | 89 | 30 | 12 | 3 | 9 | 12 | 24 | -- | -- | -- | -- | -- |
| Oddset Ligaen totals | | | -- | -- | -- | -- | -- | -- | -- | -- | -- | -- | -- | -- | -- | -- | -- |
