= Olli Lehtinen =

Finnish boxer

Personal information
- Nationality: Finnish
- Born: 27 May 1915; Helsinki, Finland
- Died: 28 September 1992 (aged 77); Helsinki, Finland

Sport
- Sport: Boxing

Olli Lehtinen (27 May 1915 – 28 September 1992) was a Finnish boxer. He competed in the men's flyweight event at the 1948 Summer Olympics.
