= Peter Staroň =

Slovak ice hockey player

- Born: 15 May 1973 (age 52) Bratislava, Czechoslovakia
- Height: 5 ft 11 in (180 cm)
- Position: Right wing
- Slovak Extraliga team: HC Slovan Bratislava
- Playing career: 1992–2010

Peter Staroň (born 15 May 1973) is a Slovak former professional ice hockey player.

He played with HC Slovan Bratislava in the Slovak Extraliga.
