= Ladislav Vlček =

Czech professional ice hockey player (born 1981)

- Born: September 26, 1981 (age 44)
- Height: 6 ft 0 in (183 cm)
- Weight: 192 lb (87 kg; 13 st 10 lb)
- Position: Forward
- Shot: Right
- Czech Extraliga team: HC Kladno
- NHL draft: 192nd overall, 2000; Dallas Stars
- Playing career: 1999–2019

Ladislav Vlček
Medal record

Representing Czech Republic

Men's Roller inline hockey

World Games
Bronze medal – third place	2013 Cali	Team

Ladislav Vlček (born September 26, 1981) is a former Czech professional ice hockey player. He was selected by the Dallas Stars in the 6th round (192nd overall) of the 2000 NHL entry draft.

Vlček played with HC Kladno in the Czech Extraliga during the 2010–11 Czech Extraliga season.

== Career statistics ==
=== Regular season and playoffs ===
			Regular season					Playoffs
Season	Team	League	GP	G	A	Pts	PIM	GP	G	A	Pts	PIM
1998–99	HC Velvana Kladno	CZE U20	46	13	27	40		—	—	—	—	—
1998–99	HC Velvana Kladno	ELH	4	0	1	1	0	—	—	—	—	—
1999–2000	HC Velvana Kladno	CZE U20	34	16	15	31	16	—	—	—	—	—
1999–2000	HC Velvana Kladno	ELH	21	3	2	5	6	—	—	—	—	—
1999–2000	HK Lev Slaný	CZE.3	4	3	0	3	2	—	—	—	—	—
1999–2000	HK Kralupy nad Vltavou	CZE.3	1	0	1	1	0	5	2	2	4	4
2000–01	HC Vagnerplast Kladno	CZE U20	4	3	6	9	4	—	—	—	—	—
2000–01	HC Vagnerplast Kladno	ELH	45	6	10	16	22	—	—	—	—	—
2000–01	HC Mladá Boleslav	CZE.3	5	2	0	2	4	8	2	2	4	8
2001–02	HC Vagnerplast Kladno	ELH	20	3	1	4	14	—	—	—	—	—
2001–02	HC Oceláři Třinec	ELH	28	3	6	9	18	6	1	0	1	2
2002–03	HC Energie Karlovy Vary	ELH	12	1	0	1	2	—	—	—	—	—
2002–03	HC Hamé Zlín	ELH	13	2	1	3	0	—	—	—	—	—
2002–03	HC Berounští Medvědi	CZE.2	12	3	3	6	12	—	—	—	—	—
2003–04	IHC Písek	CZE.2	5	1	0	1	0	—	—	—	—	—
2003–04	KLH Chomutov	CZE.2	7	2	0	2	0	2	0	0	0	0
2003–04	HC Rabat Kladno	ELH	9	1	1	2	2	—	—	—	—	—
2004–05	HC Slovan Ústečtí Lvi	CZE.2	8	0	1	1	6	—	—	—	—	—
2004–05	HC Olomouc	CZE.2	30	3	8	11	18	—	—	—	—	—
2005–06	HC Rabat Kladno	ELH	6	0	0	0	2	—	—	—	—	—
2005–06	HC Berounští Medvědi	CZE.2	50	7	13	20	46	—	—	—	—	—
2006–07	HC Berounští Medvědi	CZE.2	47	12	11	23	69	—	—	—	—	—
2007–08	HC Berounští Medvědi	CZE.2	36	5	8	13	76	—	—	—	—	—
2008–09	HC Berounští Medvědi	CZE.2	46	13	7	20	52	—	—	—	—	—
2009–10	HC Berounští Medvědi	CZE.2	46	11	11	22	46	—	—	—	—	—
2009–10	HC Sparta Praha	ELH	5	0	0	0	0	—	—	—	—	—
2010–11	HC Berounští Medvědi	CZE.2	44	10	7	17	46	4	1	0	1	29
2010–11	HC Vagnerplast Kladno	ELH	1	0	0	0	2	—	—	—	—	—
2011–12	HC Berounští Medvědi	CZE.2	48	5	9	14	36	—	—	—	—	—
2012–13	HC Řisuty	CZE.3	34	14	11	25	54	8	8	6	14	6
2013–14	HC Řisuty	CZE.3	31	10	12	22	38	4	1	2	3	6
2014–15	HC Řisuty	CZE.3	32	12	17	29	40	3	0	1	1	12
2017–18	HK Lev Slaný	CZE.4	12	1	3	4	45	—	—	—	—	—
2018–19	HK Lev Slaný	CZE.4		0	0	0		—	—	—	—	—
ELH totals			164	19	22	41	68	6	1	0	1	2
CZE.2 totals			379	72	78	150	407	6	1	0	1	29

=== International ===
Year	Team	Event	GP	G	A	Pts	PIM
2001	Czech Republic	WJC	6	1	0	1	2
Junior totals			6	1	0	1	2
