= Roman Šimunek =

Slovak ice hockey player

- Born: 2 January 1982 (age 43); Czechoslovakia
- Position: Forward
- Slovak Extraliga team: HC Slovan Bratislava
- Playing career: 1996–present

Roman Šimunek (born 2 January 1982) is a Slovak professional ice hockey player.

He played with HC Slovan Bratislava in the Slovak Extraliga.
