= Youssef Riener =

Austrian ice hockey player

- Born: April 10, 1986 (age 40) Vienna, Austria
- Height: 5 ft 9 in (175 cm)
- Weight: 176 lb (80 kg; 12 st 8 lb)
- Position: Defence
- Shot: Left
- Played for: Wiener EV; EC Salzburg; Black Wings Linz; EC Dornbirn; Vienna Capitals; ATSE Graz; VEU Feldkirch; EC Kitzbühel
- Playing career: 2003–2021

Youssef Riener (born 10 April 1986) is an Austrian ice hockey player currently playing for EHC Black Wings Linz of the Austrian Hockey League.

Riener began his career with Wiener EV before moving to EC Red Bull Salzburg. He moved to Black Wings Linz in 2006 where he has become a regular member of their blueline. He has also represented Austria in the World Junior Championship.

== Career statistics ==
			Regular season					Playoffs
Season	Team	League	GP	G	A	Pts	PIM	GP	G	A	Pts	PIM
2001–02	Wiener Eislöwen U20	Austria U20	15	4	3	7	10	—	—	—	—	—
2003–04	Lukko U18	U18 SM-sarja	2	0	0	0	2	—	—	—	—	—
2003–04	Lukko U20	U20 SM-liiga	15	0	1	1	12	—	—	—	—	—
2003–04	Wiener Eislöwen U20	Austria U20	11	0	8	8	6	—	—	—	—	—
2003–04	Wiener Eislöwen	Austria2	24	3	0	3	45	—	—	—	—	—
2004–05	EC Salzburg U20	Austria U20	13	4	6	10	26	—	—	—	—	—
2004–05	EC Salzburg II	Austria2	33	2	10	12	38	—	—	—	—	—
2004–05	EC Salzburg	EBEL	21	0	1	1	10	—	—	—	—	—
2005–06	EC Salzburg U20	Austria U20	17	7	14	21	40	—	—	—	—	—
2005–06	EC Salzburg II	Austria2	29	4	12	16	24	—	—	—	—	—
2005–06	EC Salzburg	EBEL	1	0	0	0	0	1	0	0	0	0
2006–07	Black Wings Linz	EBEL	14	1	1	2	8	—	—	—	—	—
2007–08	Black Wings Linz	EBEL	46	0	2	2	30	11	0	0	0	0
2008–09	EC Dornbirn	Austria2	28	4	6	10	42	11	0	6	6	10
2009–10	Vienna Capitals	EBEL	48	1	4	5	14	12	0	1	1	0
2010–11	Vienna Capitals	EBEL	—	—	—	—	—	—	—	—	—	—
2011–12	ATSE Graz	Austria2	26	1	12	13	12	10	1	1	2	4
2012–13	VEU Feldkirch	INL	30	2	9	11	16	—	—	—	—	—
2013–14	VEU Feldkirch	INL	35	5	14	19	12	5	0	0	0	0
2014–15	VEU Feldkirch	INL	24	3	12	15	10	11	3	5	8	10
2015–16	VEU Feldkirch	INL	32	2	11	13	22	7	1	3	4	2
2016–17	VEU Feldkirch	AlpsHL	40	0	8	8	34	3	0	1	1	2
2017–18	VEU Feldkirch	AlpsHL	37	0	6	6	16	6	0	1	1	6
2018–19	VEU Feldkirch	AlpsHL	40	1	9	10	47	2	0	0	0	6
2018–19	VEU Feldkirch	Austria2	—	—	—	—	—	2	0	0	0	2
2019–20	Kitzbüheler EC	AlpsHL	43	2	4	6	14	—	—	—	—	—
2020–21	Kitzbüheler EC	AlpsHL	36	0	5	5	14	—	—	—	—	—
EBEL totals			130	2	8	10	62	24	0	1	1	0
INL totals			121	12	46	58	60	23	4	8	12	12
AlpsHL totals			196	3	32	35	125	11	0	2	2	14
