= Thomas Greilinger =

German ice hockey player

- Born: August 6, 1981 (age 45) Deggendorf, West Germany
- Height: 5 ft 11 in (180 cm)
- Weight: 198 lb (90 kg; 14 st 2 lb)
- Position: Winger
- Shoots: Right
- Oberliga team Former teams: Deggendorfer SC; München Barons; SERC Wild Wings; Nürnberg Ice Tigers; Adler Mannheim; ERC Ingolstadt
- National team: Germany
- Playing career: 1997–present

Thomas Greilinger (born August 6, 1981, in Deggendorf) is a German professional ice hockey forward. He currently plays for Deggendorfer SC of the Oberliga.

== Career ==
Greilinger made his Deutsche Eishockey Liga debut during the 1999–00 playoffs with the Munich Barons. The following season he played with the SERC Wild Wings. Greilinger played three seasons with the Nuermberg Ice Tigers before joining ERC Ingolstadt in 2008.

Greilinger played with Ingolstadt for the next 11 seasons, before opting to leave the DEL following the 2018–19 season, agreeing to continue and close out his playing career with hometown club, Deggendorfer SC. In doing so, Greilinger dropped two tiers to the third-tier Oberliga, following Deggendorfer's relegation from DEL2 the previous season.

Greilinger was selected to play for the German national team for the 2010 Winter Olympics.

== Career statistics ==
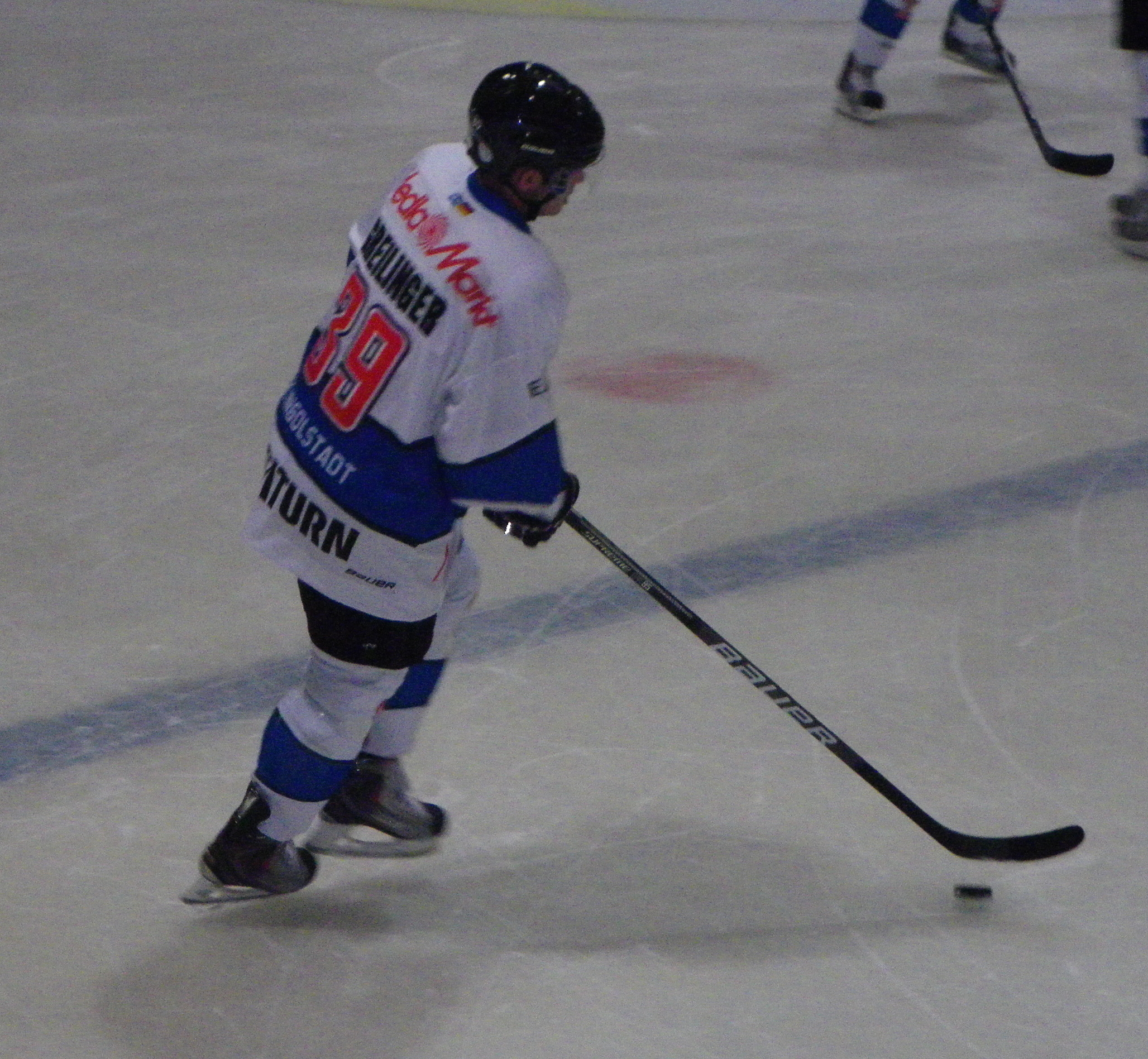
Greilinger in warm-ups for Ingolstadt.

=== Regular season and playoffs ===
			Regular season					Playoffs
Season	Team	League	GP	G	A	Pts	PIM	GP	G	A	Pts	PIM
1997–98	Deggendorfer EC	GER.2	32	4	6	10	6	5	1	2	3	0
1998–99	Deggendorfer EC	GER.3	41	8	21	29	20	—	—	—	—	—
1999–2000	Deggendorfer EC	GER.3	52	53	35	88	78	—	—	—	—	—
1999–2000	Deggendorfer EC	GER U20	6	10	8	18	4	—	—	—	—	—
1999–2000	München Barons	DEL	—	—	—	—	—	4	0	0	0	0
2000–01	SERC Wild Wings	DEL	54	9	13	22	18	—	—	—	—	—
2001–02	Nürnberg Ice Tigers	DEL	44	14	16	30	14	4	0	0	0	0
2002–03	Nürnberg Ice Tigers	DEL	48	9	14	23	52	5	3	1	4	4
2003–04	Nürnberg Ice Tigers	DEL	51	17	21	38	16	6	2	3	5	4
2004–05	Adler Mannheim	DEL	31	10	16	26	10	—	—	—	—	—
2004–05	Heilbronner Falken	GER.3	1	1	0	1	0	—	—	—	—	—
2006–07	Deggendorfer SC	GER.4	29	42	38	80	60	8	9	9	18	0
2007–08	Deggendorfer SC	GER.3	54	52	54	106	36	—	—	—	—	—
2008–09	ERC Ingolstadt	DEL	52	15	19	34	16	—	—	—	—	—
2009–10	ERC Ingolstadt	DEL	55	38	35	73	44	8	1	1	2	29
2010–11	ERC Ingolstadt	DEL	24	13	10	23	8	3	3	2	5	4
2011–12	ERC Ingolstadt	DEL	47	22	32	54	20	9	10	7	17	4
2012–13	ERC Ingolstadt	DEL	38	16	28	44	22	6	3	1	4	2
2013–14	ERC Ingolstadt	DEL	42	11	17	28	6	21	5	11	16	16
2014–15	ERC Ingolstadt	DEL	47	9	23	32	10	17	4	11	15	0
2015–16	ERC Ingolstadt	DEL	52	20	20	40	24	2	0	0	0	0
2016–17	ERC Ingolstadt	DEL	45	16	10	26	10	2	0	1	1	0
2017–18	ERC Ingolstadt	DEL	52	17	17	34	10	5	3	1	4	0
2018–19	ERC Ingolstadt	DEL	52	13	22	35	20	7	2	5	7	4
2019–20	Deggendorfer SC	GER.3	35	39	41	80	36	—	—	—	—	—
2020–21	Deggendorfer SC	GER.3	22	23	20	43	32	—	—	—	—	—
2021–22	Deggendorfer SC	GER.3	30	20	13	33	12	2	0	0	0	2
DEL totals			734	249	313	562	300	100	36	45	81	69

=== International ===
Year	Team	Event	GP	G	A	Pts	PIM
1998	Germany	EJC B	6	3	1	4	4
1999	Germany	WJC18	6	0	1	1	6
2000	Germany	WJC B	5	4	2	6	6
2000	Germany	WC B	7	3	7	10	0
2001	Germany	OGQ	3	0	0	0	0
2001	Germany	WC	6	0	0	0	2
2004	Germany	WC	5	0	0	0	0
2010	Germany	OG	4	0	0	0	2
2011	Germany	WC	5	2	1	3	2
2012	Germany	WC	7	2	0	2	4
2013	Germany	WC	7	0	1	1	0
Junior totals			17	7	4	11	16
Senior totals			44	7	9	16	10
