= Mark Brunnegger =

Austrian ice hockey defenceman

- Born: 1 November 1985 (age 40) Graz, Austria
- Height: 6 ft 0 in (183 cm)
- Weight: 200 lb (91 kg; 14 st 4 lb)
- Position: Defence
- Shoots: Left
- EBEL team: Graz 99ers
- Playing career: 2001–present

Mark Brunnegger (born 1 November 1985 in Graz) is an Austrian ice hockey defenceman currently playing for the Graz 99ers of the Erste Bank Hockey League.

== Playing career ==
Brunnegger has been with his hometown team since 2001 and has been a regular in the 99ers team since 2003.

== Career statistics ==
			Regular season					Playoffs
Season	Team	League	GP	G	A	Pts	PIM	GP	G	A	Pts	PIM
2001-02	Graz 99ers	EBEL	3	0	0	0	0	--	--	--	--	--
2002-03	Graz 99ers	EBEL	7	0	0	0	0	--	--	--	--	--
2003-04	Graz 99ers	EBEL	43	0	0	0	0	2	0	0	0	0
2004-05	Graz 99ers	EBEL	39	0	4	4	18	--	--	--	--	--
2005-06	Graz 99ers	EBEL	44	3	2	5	108	--	--	--	--	--
2006-07	Graz 99ers	EBEL	51	2	6	8	80	--	--	--	--	--
2007-08	Graz 99ers	EBEL	36	0	2	2	34	--	--	--	--	--
EBEL Totals			223	5	14	19	240	2	0	0	0	0
