= Steffen Tölzer =

German ice hockey player

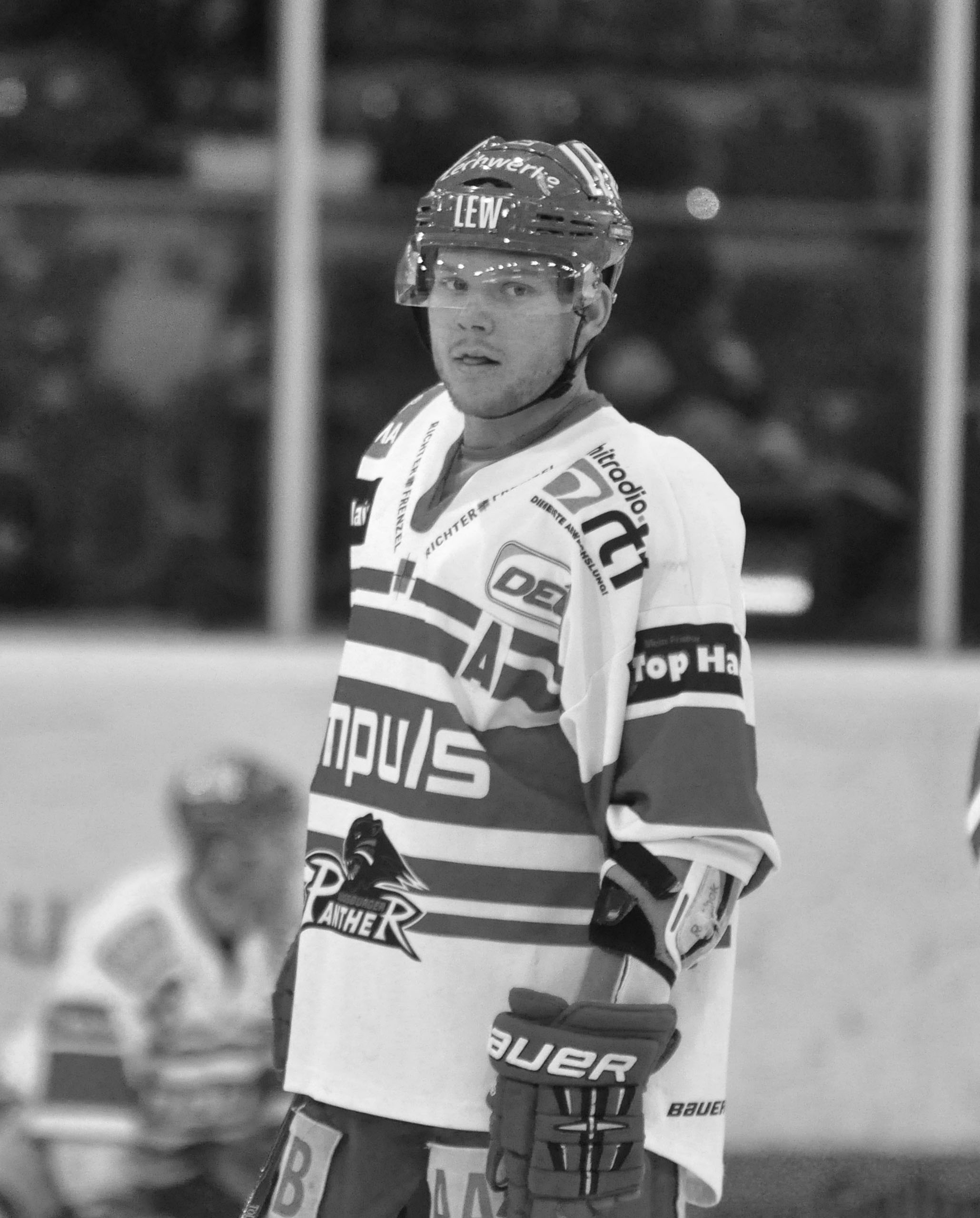
- Born: June 12, 1985 (age 39); Zittau, East Germany
- Height: 1.82 m (6 ft 0 in)
- Weight: 94 kg (207 lb; 14 st 11 lb)
- Position: Defence
- Shoots: Left
- 3.GBun team Former teams: Starbulls Rosenheim; Augsburger Panther
- Playing career: 2002–present

Steffen Tölzer (born June 12, 1985) is a German professional ice hockey defenceman who currently plays for Starbulls Rosenheim in the Oberliga (3.GBun). He most notably played with Augsburger Panther of the Deutsche Eishockey Liga (DEL).

== Career statistics ==
=== Regular season and playoffs ===
			Regular season					Playoffs
Season	Team	League	GP	G	A	Pts	PIM	GP	G	A	Pts	PIM
2001–02	Augsburger EV II	4.GBun	2	0	0	0	0	—	—	—	—	—
2002–03	Augsburger EV II	3.GBun	23	1	0	1	32	—	—	—	—	—
2003–04	Augsburger EV II	4.GBun	25	8	16	24	0	2	1	3	4	0
2003–04	Augsburger Panther	DEL	3	0	0	0	0	—	—	—	—	—
2004–05	Augsburger Panther	DEL	11	0	0	0	0	2	0	0	0	0
2004–05	EC Peiting	3.GBun	28	4	12	16	63	—	—	—	—	—
2005–06	Augsburger Panther	DEL	43	0	0	0	10	—	—	—	—	—
2005–06	EV Landsberg	3.GBun	22	1	6	7	22	8	0	3	3	16
2006–07	EV Landsberg	2.GBun	3	0	0	0	2	—	—	—	—	—
2006–07	Augsburger Panther	DEL	51	3	2	5	77	—	—	—	—	—
2007–08	Augsburger Panther	DEL	55	3	8	11	32	—	—	—	—	—
2008–09	Augsburger Panther	DEL	33	2	4	6	30	4	0	0	0	2
2009–10	Augsburger Panther	DEL	54	0	4	4	20	14	0	1	1	2
2010–11	Augsburger Panther	DEL	45	2	11	13	41	—	—	—	—	—
2011–12	Augsburger Panther	DEL	51	3	7	10	18	2	0	0	0	2
2012–13	Augsburger Panther	DEL	46	2	8	10	56	2	1	1	2	0
2013–14	Augsburger Panther	DEL	12	1	0	1	6	—	—	—	—	—
2014–15	Augsburger Panther	DEL	51	1	5	6	18	—	—	—	—	—
2015–16	Augsburger Panther	DEL	52	3	16	19	38	—	—	—	—	—
2016–17	Augsburger Panther	DEL	52	2	13	15	20	7	0	0	0	6
2017–18	Augsburger Panther	DEL	47	1	8	9	6	—	—	—	—	—
2018–19	Augsburger Panther	DEL	40	3	5	8	28	13	0	3	3	8
2019–20	Augsburger Panther	DEL	43	2	3	5	4	—	—	—	—	—
2020–21	Augsburger Panther	DEL	37	0	1	1	14	—	—	—	—	—
DEL totals			726	28	95	123	418	44	1	5	6	18

=== International ===
Year	Team	Event	Result	GP	G	A	Pts	PIM
2005	Germany	WJC	9th	6	0	0	0	4
Junior totals				6	0	0	0	4
