= Christian Wichert =

German ice hockey player (born 1987)

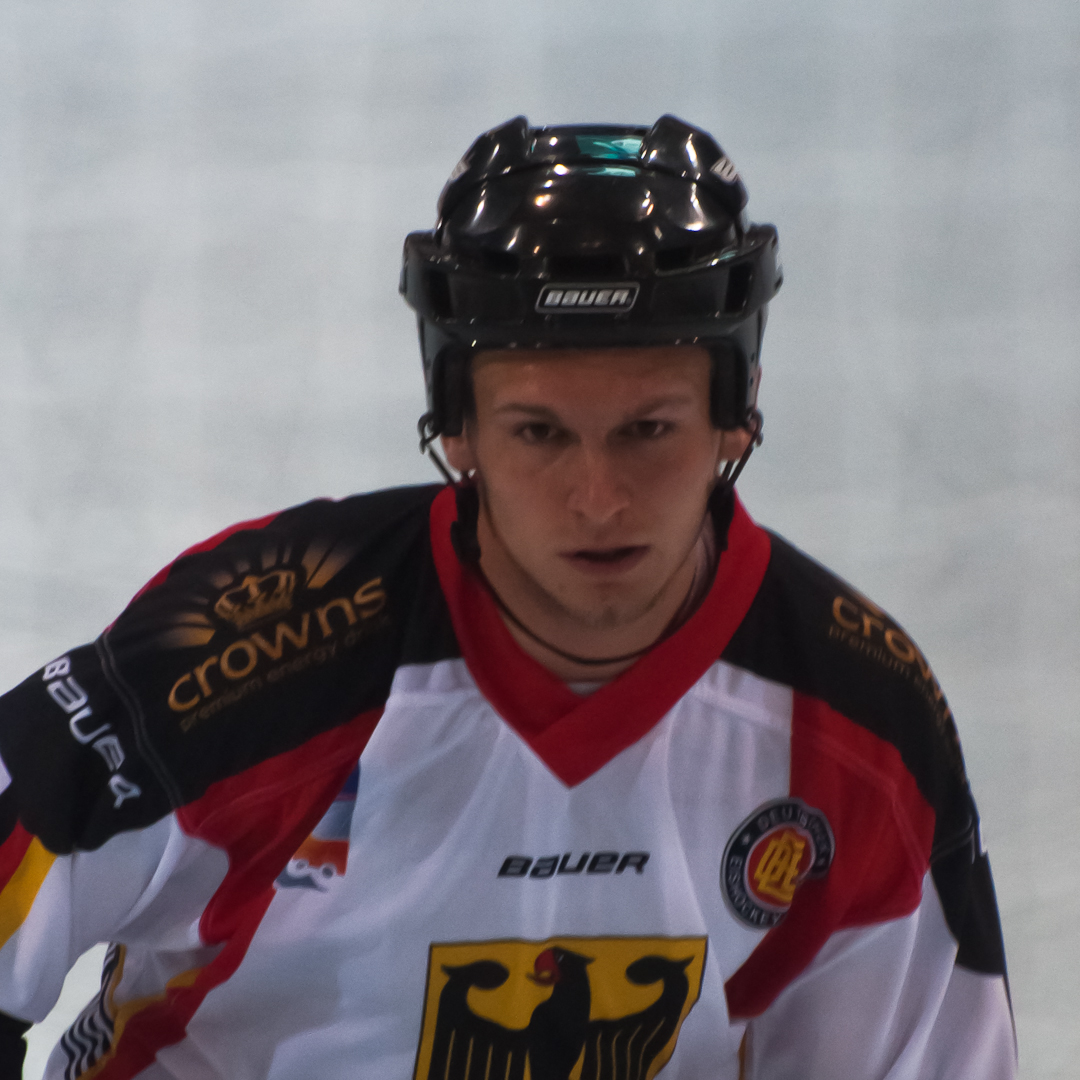
- Born: May 10, 1987 (age 37); Munich, Germany
- Height: 6 ft 2 in (188 cm)
- Weight: 187 lb (85 kg; 13 st 5 lb)
- Position: Forward
- Shoots: Left
- DEL team Former teams: Free Agent; Iserlohn Roosters; Augsburger Panther; EHC München
- National team: Germany
- Playing career: 2005–present

Christian Wichert (born. May 10, 1987) is a German professional ice hockey forward who is currently an Unrestricted Free Agent. He most recently played for EHC München of the Deutsche Eishockey Liga (DEL).
