= Stefan Langwieder =

German ice hockey player

- Born: 8 January 1987 (age 39) Munich, West Germany
- Height: 6 ft 0 in (183 cm)
- Weight: 196 lb (89 kg; 14 st 0 lb)
- Position: Defence
- Shoots: Right
- DEL team Former teams: Iserlohn Roosters; Adler Mannheim
- National team: Germany
- Playing career: 2005–present

Stefan Langwieder (born 8 January 1987) is a German professional ice hockey defender who currently plays for the Iserlohn Roosters of the Deutsche Eishockey Liga. He initially played for Adler Mannheim during the 2007 season before signing with the Iserlohn Roosters in 2008. On 5 April 2009, Langwieder was signed to a three-year extension to remain with Iserlohn.

== Career statistics ==
=== Regular season and playoffs ===
			Regular season					Playoffs
Season	Team	League	GP	G	A	Pts	PIM	GP	G	A	Pts	PIM
2004–05	Adler Mannheim	DEL	5	0	0	0	2	—	—	—	—	—
2004–05	Mannheimer ERC	4.GBun	4	2	5	7	2	—	—	—	—	—
2005–06	Adler Mannheim	DEL	37	1	1	2	10	—	—	—	—	—
2005–06	Heilbronner Falken	3.GBun	26	4	8	12	34	4	0	2	2	6
2006–07	Portland Winterhawks	WHL	59	2	14	16	91	—	—	—	—	—
2007–08	Adler Mannheim	DEL	4	0	0	0	0	—	—	—	—	—
2007–08	Heilbronner Falken	2.GBun	45	2	7	9	38	9	0	2	2	4
2008–09	Iserlohn Roosters	DEL	52	1	5	6	30	—	—	—	—	—
2009–10	Iserlohn Roosters	DEL	54	2	7	9	57	—	—	—	—	—
2010–11	Iserlohn Roosters	DEL	43	0	3	3	20	—	—	—	—	—
2010–11	Heilbronner Falken	2.GBun	7	0	1	1	14	—	—	—	—	—
DEL totals			195	4	16	20	119	—	—	—	—	—

=== International ===
Year	Team	Comp	GP	G	A	Pts	PIM
2004	Germany	U17	5	0	2	2	2
2005	Germany	WJC18	6	0	1	1	6
2006	Germany	WJC-D1	5	0	0	0	2
2007	Germany	WJC	6	0	0	0	8
Junior int'l totals			22	0	3	3	18
