= David Cespiva =

German professional ice hockey player

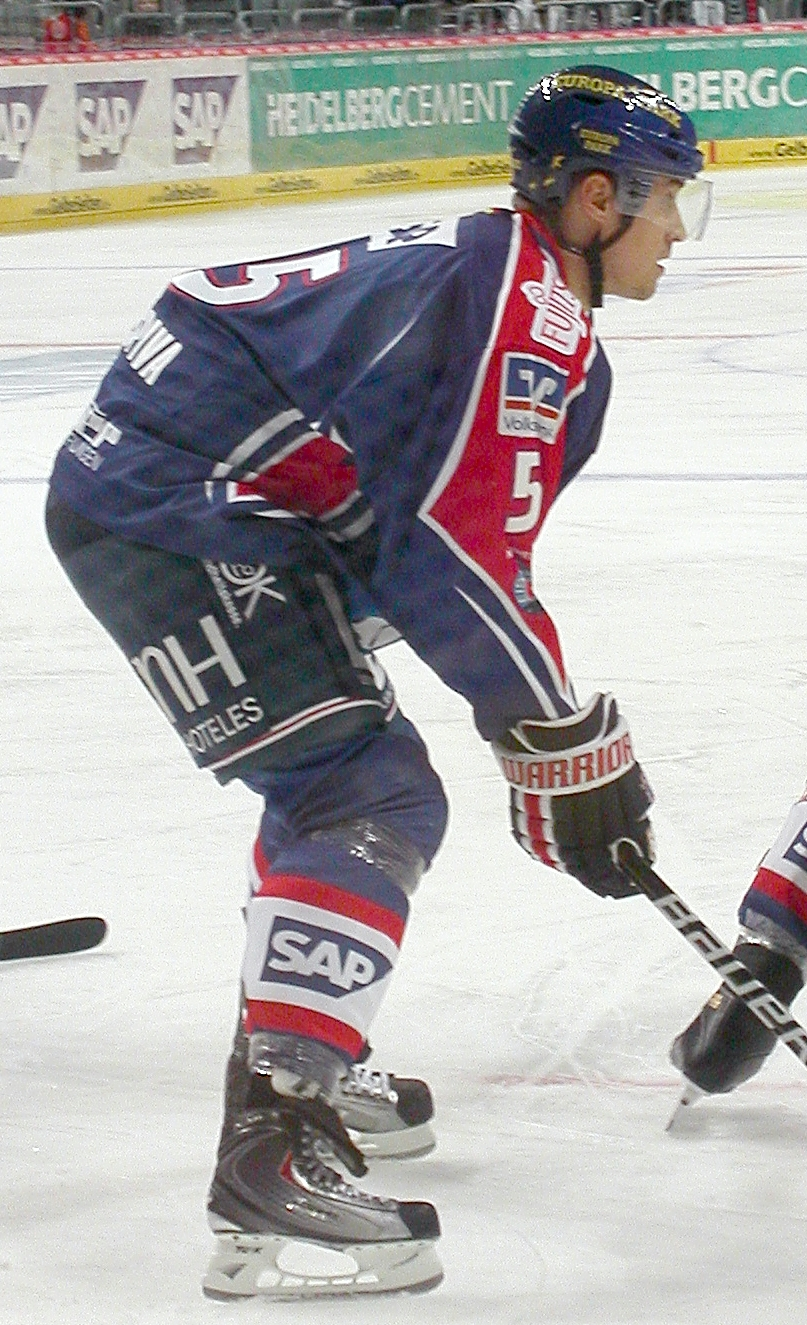
- Born: 5 November 1986 (age 39) Duisburg, Germany
- Height: 6 ft 2 in (188 cm)
- Weight: 198 lb (90 kg; 14 st 2 lb)
- Position: Defence
- Shoots: Right
- DEL team Former teams: Free Agent; Adler Mannheim; Nürnberg Ice Tigers; Krefeld Pinguine; EHC München
- National team: Germany
- Playing career: 2004–present

David Cespiva (born 5 November 1986) is a German professional ice hockey player who is currently an Unrestricted Free Agent. He most recently played for EHC München in the Deutsche Eishockey Liga (DEL). He joined München on a one-year contract from Adler Mannheim on 6 May 2011.

== Career statistics ==
=== Regular season and playoffs ===
			Regular season					Playoffs
Season	Team	League	GP	G	A	Pts	PIM	GP	G	A	Pts	PIM
2003–04	Mannheimer ERC II	4.GBun	2	1	1	2	8	—	—	—	—	—
2004–05	Adler Mannheim	DEL	15	0	0	0	2	—	—	—	—	—
2004–05	Heilbronner Falken	3.GBun	24	3	4	7	99	—	—	—	—	—
2004–05	Schwenninger Wild Wings	2.GBun	14	2	0	2	4	7	0	1	1	4
2005–06	Adler Mannheim	DEL	31	1	1	2	6	—	—	—	—	—
2005–06	Heilbronner Falken	3.GBun	27	3	4	7	40	4	0	0	0	10
2006–07	Nürnberg Ice Tigers	DEL	48	1	3	4	24	13	2	1	3	10
2006–07	SC Riessersee	3.GBun	3	1	2	3	4	—	—	—	—	—
2007–08	Nürnberg Ice Tigers	DEL	56	0	11	11	52	5	0	2	2	16
2008–09	Nürnberg Ice Tigers	DEL	51	2	7	9	66	5	0	0	0	2
2009–10	Nürnberg Ice Tigers	DEL	6	0	0	0	0	—	—	—	—	—
2009–10	Krefeld Pinguine	DEL	49	0	3	3	18	—	—	—	—	—
2010–11	Adler Mannheim	DEL	37	0	1	1	35	—	—	—	—	—
2010–11	Heilbronner Falken	2.GBun	11	1	2	3	16	4	0	1	1	10
2011–12	EHC München	DEL	51	0	7	7	48	—	—	—	—	—
2012–13	EHC München	DEL	50	0	7	7	24	—	—	—	—	—
DEL totals			394	4	40	44	275	23	2	3	5	28

=== International ===
Year	Team	Comp	GP	G	A	Pts	PIM
2003	Germany	WJC18-D1	5	0	2	2	4
2004	Germany	WJC18-D1	5	1	1	2	14
2006	Germany	WJC-D1	5	1	0	1	8
Junior int'l totals			15	2	3	5	26
