= 2007–08 German ice hockey league season =

German ice hockey season 2007–08
- Nation
- Germany
- Levels
- DEL
- 2nd Bundesliga
- Oberliga
- Number of leagues
- 3
- Number of teams
- 48
- Champions
- Eisbären Berlin

The DEL, 2nd Bundesliga and Oberliga are the first three levels of ice hockey in Germany. All three leagues operate nationwide. While the DEL is an independently operated league, the other two are run by the German ice hockey federation, the DEB, through the ESBG. The leagues below the Oberliga are operated by the state federations (German:Landesverbände) and don't run nationwide. The 2007–08 season for the three top leagues started on 6 September 2007 with the first round in the DEL and finished on 25 April 2008 with the fifth and last game of the 2nd Bundesliga finals.

== Champions ==
- DEL: Eisbären Berlin
- 2nd Bundesliga: Kassel Huskies
- Oberliga: Dresdner Eislöwen

== Deutsche Eishockey Liga, the DEL ==
For main article, see Deutsche Eishockey Liga

The DEL is the highest tier of German ice hockey. The league was played with 15 clubs in the 2007–08 season, one more than the previous season, because the 2006–07 2nd Bundesliga champion EHC Wolfsburg Grizzly Adams had joined the league. The modus however remained the same. Each club played the others four times, resulting in 56 regular season games per club. The top six clubs at the end of the regular season qualified for the first round of the play-offs. The clubs seven to ten played a preliminary round to determine the last two places for the first round. For the teams placed eleven to fifteen, the season has ended. No club was relegated from the DEL this season. The league will however expand and admit a sixteenth team for next season.

The league was won, for a third time in four years, by the Eisbären Berlin.

=== Final table ===
The final table operates under the following points system: Three points for a win, two for a win after overtime or penalties, one for a loss after overtime or penalties and no points for an outright loss.

Position	Name	P	Won	OTW	PW	OTL	PL	Lost	GF	GA	Points
1	Sinupret Ice Tigers	56	33	1	3	3	5	11	206	144	115
2	Eisbären Berlin	56	33	2	3	3	1	14	231	165	113
3	Kölner Haie	56	28	6	3	4	3	12	192	146	109
4	Frankfurt Lions	56	24	5	3	4	5	15	188	172	97
5	Iserlohn Roosters	56	25	4	4	4	1	18	208	196	96
6	Adler Mannheim (C)	56	24	3	5	2	2	20	180	174	92
7	Hamburg Freezers	56	23	1	4	1	7	20	194	171	87
8	Hannover Scorpions	56	20	4	3	3	9	17	171	171	86
9	DEG Metro Stars	56	23	2	3	3	3	22	169	173	85
10	ERC Ingolstadt	56	19	7	4	3	1	22	180	190	83
11	Krefeld Pinguine	56	22	2	1	3	5	23	191	193	80
12	Augsburger Panther	56	16	3	4	3	2	28	158	187	67
13	EHC Wolfsburg Grizzly Adams (N)	56	14	2	3	2	1	34	152	202	55
14	Straubing Tigers	56	12	0	4	4	2	34	132	197	50
15	EV Duisburg	56	10	3	2	3	2	36	142	213	45

- Abbreviations: P = Games played, OTW = Overtime win, PW = Win after penalty shootout, OTL = Overtime loss, PL = Loss after penalty shoutout, GF = Goals for, GA = Goals against, (C) = Defending champion, (N) = New club
- Source:"Del 2007–08". DEL website. Archived from the original on 27 March 2008.

=== Play-offs ===
The four rounds of the 2007–08 play-offs were played under the following system:

- Preliminary round: Best-of-three
- First round: Best-of-seven
- Semifinals: Best-of-five
- Finals: Best-of-five

Unlike the regular season, in the play-offs games will not be decided by penalty shoot-outs but in overtime (OT) sudden-death. In all play-off rounds the higher placed team from the regular season has home advantage in the uneven numbered games (Game 1, 3, 5, 7) and the other team in the even numbered games (Game 2, 4, 6).

==== Preliminary round ====
Team	Team	Game 1	Game 2	Game 3
Hamburg Freezers	ERC Ingolstadt	3–5	5–4 OT	4–3
Hannover Scorpions	DEG Metro Stars	4–3	2–4	1–2 OT

==== First round ====
Team	Team	Game 1	Game 2	Game 3	Game 4	Game 5	Game 6	Game 7
Sinupret Ice Tigers	DEG Metro Stars	3–2	1–3	1–2	3–6	2–3	—	—
Eisbären Berlin	Hamburg Freezers	2–4	7–4	6–1	6–1	4–3 OT	—	—
Kölner Haie	Adler Mannheim	4–3	1–2	5–4 OT	4–3 OT	4–1	—	—
Frankfurt Lions	Iserlohn Roosters	4–3 OT	2–3 OT	3–4 OT	1–5	4–2	4–0	4–3

==== Semi finals ====
Team	Team	Game 1	Game 2	Game 3	Game 4	Game 5
Eisbären Berlin	DEG Metro Stars	4–1	3–4	4–3 OT	1–5	3–1
Kölner Haie	Frankfurt Lions	7–1	4–5 OT	2–1 OT	3–4	3–2

==== Finals ====
Team	Team	Game 1	Game 2	Game 3	Game 4	Game 5
Eisbären Berlin	Kölner Haie	3–2 OT	1–2	4–3	2–1 OT	—

=== Play-off tree ===
First round
1	Sinupret Ice Tigers	1
9	DEG Metro Stars	4
2	Eisbären Berlin	4
7	Hamburg Freezers	1
3	Kölner Haie	4
6	Adler Mannheim	1
4	Frankfurt Lions	4
5	Iserlohn Roosters	3

Semi final
2	Eisbären Berlin	3
9	DEG Metro Stars	2
3	Kölner Haie	3
4	Frankfurt Lions	2

Final
2	Eisbären Berlin	3
3	Kölner Haie	1

=== Top Scorers ===
The five highest placed scores in the regular season and play-offs are:

==== Regular season ====
Player	Club	Games	Goals	Assists	Points
(Germany) Robert Hock	Iserlohn Roosters	56	24	63	87
(Canada) Steve Walker	Eisbären Berlin	53	27	58	85
(Canada) Peter Sarno	Hamburg Freezers	56	26	48	74
(Germany) Michael Wolf	Iserlohn Roosters	56	44	27	71
(Slovakia) Ivan Čiernik	Kölner Haie	56	38	28	66

==== Play-offs ====
Player	Club	Games	Goals	Assists	Points
(Canada) Nathan Robinson	Eisbären Berlin	13	4	11	15
(Slovakia) Ivan Ciernik	Kölner Haie	14	11	2	13
(Canada) Chris Taylor	Frankfurt Lions	12	5	8	13
(Canada) Peter Sarno	Hamburg Freezers	8	4	9	13
(Germany) Sven Felski	Eisbären Berlin	13	3	10	13
(Canada) Jason Young	Frankfurt Lions	12	3	10	13

== 2nd Bundesliga ==
For main article, see 2nd Bundesliga

The 2nd Bundesliga is the second highest tier of ice hockey in Germany. The league played with 14 clubs in the 2007–08 season, the same number it had since 2001. Each club played each other four times during the regular season. The top eight teams in the league qualified for the play-offs to determined the 2nd Bundesliga champion who also has the opportunity to gain promotion to the DEL this season. For the clubs placed nine and ten, the season has finished after the regular round. The bottom four clubs play out the two relegated teams from the 2nd Bundesliga. However, due to the later insolvency of two of the league's teams, only one club, the EV Landsberg, was relegated.

The league was won by the Kassel Huskies who thereby earned the right to apply for a DEL licence and return to the league they played in until 2006.

The Moskitos Essen and Eisbären Regensburg both declared insolvency on 15 April 2008, being unable to meet their debts. Both clubs are immediately relegated from the 2nd Bundesliga. The two relegated clubs, Lausitz and Landsberg, are the first replacement for the two. The EV Landsberg is in financial trouble themselves and will probably not take part in the next 2nd Bundesliga season, therefore the Wölfe Freiburg become the next replacement as best-placed semifinal loser from the Oberliga. Should Regensburg be able to survive the insolvency, the team could enter in the Oberliga for the 2008–09 season, this is however seen as unlikely by the club. If not it will take up the place of its reserve team in the Bavarian Landesliga (Tier V). Which league the Moskitos Essen will be playing in 2008–09 is not yet clear but it will not be the 2nd Bundesliga. Like Regensburg, the team could take the place of the reserve side which won promotion to the Regionalliga (Tier IV) this season.

Due to the structure of the 2nd Bundesliga, where all teams playing are separate companies operated by the mother club, the insolvency of one of those does not mean the club itself becomes insolvent. Reserve teams are usually operated by the mother club and therefore unaffected by any insolvencies.

=== Regular season ===
The final table operates under the following points system: Three points for a win, two for a win after overtime, one for a loss after overtime and no points for an outright loss.

Position	Name	P	Won	OTW	OTL	Lost	GF	GA	GD	Points
1	Kassel Huskies	52	36	6	2	8	186	114	72	122
2	Landshut Cannibals	52	28	4	3	17	171	128	43	95
3	Heilbronner Falken (N)	52	27	4	3	18	171	132	39	92
4	SERC Wild Wings	52	25	5	6	16	185	153	32	91
5	SC Riessersee (N)	52	23	4	8	17	176	175	1	85
6	Moskitos Essen	52	24	4	2	22	196	184	12	82
7	SC Bietigheim-Bissingen	52	22	2	7	21	130	129	1	77
8	ETC Crimmitschau	52	19	5	7	21	125	140	−15	74
9	EHC München	52	19	4	5	24	150	169	−19	70
10	Eisbären Regensburg	52	18	5	4	25	134	162	−28	68
11	EV Ravensburg Tower Stars (N)	52	17	7	2	26	168	178	−10	67
12	REV Bremerhaven	52	20	2	2	28	148	164	−16	66
13	Lausitzer Füchse	52	16	1	4	31	149	184	−35	54
14	EV Landsberg 2000	52	13	4	2	33	137	214	−77	49

- Abbreviations: P = Games played, OTW = Overtime win, OTL = Overtime loss, GF = Goals for, GA = Goals against, GD = Goal difference, (N) = New club

=== Play-offs ===
The three rounds of the 2007–08 play-offs were played under the following system:

- First round: Best-of-seven
- Semifinals: Best-of-five
- Finals: Best-of-five

In all play-off rounds the higher placed team from the regular season has home advantage in the uneven numbered games (Game 1, 3, 5, 7) and the other team in the even numbered games (Game 2, 4, 6). Should a game be undecided after regular time, there will be one overtime (OT) in sudden death format. Should there still be no winner, the game is decided through penalties (P).

==== First round ====
Team	Team	Game 1	Game 2	Game 3	Game 4	Game 5	Game 6	Game 7
Kassel Huskies	ETC Crimmitschau	4–2	3–7	4–2	0–3	4–1	4–1	—
Landshut Cannibals	SC Bietigheim-Bissingen	3–2	5–0	5–2	1–3	2–1 OT	—	—
Heilbronner Falken	Moskitos Essen	2–6	4–3 P	6-7 OT	5–4 P	6–3	4–3	—
SERC Wild Wings	SC Riessersee	2–3	2–4	4–1	2–3	4–1	2–1	4–1

==== Semi finals ====
Team	Team	Game 1	Game 2	Game 3	Game 4	Game 5
Kassel Huskies	SERC Wild Wings	4–1	1–3	3–0	5–3	—
Landshut Cannibals	Heilbronner Falken	5–3	4–2	4–3	—	—

==== Finals ====
Team	Team	Game 1	Game 2	Game 3	Game 4	Game 5
Kassel Huskies	Landshut Cannibals	0–1	6–0	5–0	4–5 OT	3–2 OT

- The Kassel Huskies are the 2nd Bundesliga champions and gained the right to apply for a DEL licence.

=== Play-downs ===
The play downs consists of only one round, played in a best-of-seven format. The two loser of this round are nominally relegated to the Oberliga.

Team	Team	Game 1	Game 2	Game 3	Game 4	Game 5	Game 6	Game 7
EV Ravensburg	EV Landsberg 2000	5–4 OT	7–4	7–2	4–3	—	—	—
REV Bremerhaven	EHC Lausitzer Füchse	5–0	2–3	6–3	3–2 OT	1–2	2–3 P	6–4

- The EV Landsberg and EHC Lausitzer Füchse are relegated. Due to the insolvency of Essen and Regensburg, the Lausitzer Füchse remain in the league. The EV Landsberg could also stay in the 2nd Bundesliga but was in financial trouble themselves and will play in the Oberliga next season.

=== Play-off tree ===
First round
1	Kassel Huskies	4
8	ETC Crimmitschau	2
4	SERC Wild Wings	4
5	SC Riessersee	3
2	Landshut Cannibals	4
7	SC Bietigheim-Bissingen	1
3	Heilbronner Falken	4
6	Moskitos Essen	2

Semi final
1	Kassel Huskies	3
4	SERC Wild Wings	1
2	Landshut Cannibals	3
3	Heilbronner Falken	0

Final
1	Kassel Huskies	3
2	Landshut Cannibals	2

== Oberliga ==
For main article, see Oberliga

The Oberliga is the third tier of ice hockey in Germany and as such the lowest nationwide level; below it are currently the LEV's (Landesverbände). In the 2007–08 season the league played with 19 clubs. For the first time since 2001, the Oberliga was split into a northern and a southern group. Unlike until 2001 however, when the top teams of the two divisions only met in the finals, games between the two groups are already staged in the regular season, when teams from the same division met each other four times while teams from opposite divisions only met twice.

The first four clubs in each group qualified for the Oberliga play-offs to determine the two promoted clubs to the 2nd Bundesliga. An Oberliga final is not played as the two semifinal winners are both promoted. The regular season results between the two semifinal winners determined the Oberliga champion instead. The two fifth-placed teams and the sixth from the south finished their season with the end of the regular season. The bottom four clubs of each division played out one relegated team each, independently of each other. In turn, the three regional champions will gain promotion to the Oberliga with the possibility of more clubs moving up should the DEL, as planned, expand or a club in the top three divisions fold or withdraw.

The league was won by the Dresdner Eislöwen who are, together with the runner-up Tölzer Löwen, promoted to the 2nd Bundesliga. Due to Kassel gaining entry to the DEL, the Wölfe Freiburg were also promoted. Of the bottom two clubs, only Erfurt was relegated. Weiden withdrew from the league for financial reasons.

=== Regular season ===
The regular season saw the league split into two groups, the Oberliga Nord and Oberliga Süd, a separation which had existed until the 2000–01 season.

==== North ====
Position	Name	P	Won	OTW	OTL	Lost	GF	GA	GD	Points
1	Dresdner Eislöwen (R)	52	33	5	4	10	240	144	96	113
2	Blue Lions Leipzig (N)	52	28	6	6	12	248	170	78	102
3	EC Hannover Indians	52	28	6	6	12	219	160	59	102
4	Blue Devils Weiden	52	22	7	7	16	215	192	23	87
5	Piranhas Rostock (N)	52	18	7	5	22	184	210	−26	73
6	Saale Bulls Halle (N)	52	14	6	3	29	167	227	−60	57
7	Rote Teufel Bad Nauheim (N)	52	15	2	7	28	185	220	−35	56
8	Eisbären Juniors Berlin	52	8	5	9	30	136	187	−51	43
9	Black Dragons Erfurt (N)	52	7	3	4	38	136	293	−157	31

==== South ====
Position	Name	P	Won	OTW	OTL	Lost	GF	GA	GD	Points
1	Tölzer Löwen	54	41	2	3	8	254	128	126	130
2	Wölfe Freiburg	54	34	3	2	15	241	160	81	110
3	EV Füssen	54	35	1	1	17	283	217	66	108
4	ESV Kaufbeuren (R)	54	29	5	2	18	210	155	55	99
5	EHC Klostersee	54	27	5	5	17	209	194	15	96
6	EC Peiting	54	27	3	4	20	216	179	37	91
7	Starbulls Rosenheim	54	22	3	6	23	179	200	−21	78
8	Deggendorf Fire (N)	54	18	5	2	29	207	244	−37	66
9	TEV Miesbach	54	8	5	3	38	156	278	−122	37
10	Passau Black Hawks (N)	54	8	3	3	40	126	253	−127	33

- Abbreviations: P = Games played, OTW = Overtime win, OTL = Overtime loss, GF = Goals for, GA = Goals against, GD = Goal difference, (R) Club relegated from the 2nd Bundesliga, (N) = New club

=== Play-offs ===
The Oberliga play-offs are operating on a best-of-seven modus. The winning teams of the semifinals are promoted to the 2nd Bundesliga. Should the DEL expand to 16 teams, the best placed club of the two semifinal losers will also gain entry to the 2nd Bundesliga.

==== First round ====
Team	Team	Game 1	Game 2	Game 3	Game 4	Game 5	Game 6	Game 7
Dresdner Eislöwen	ESV Kaufbeuren	6–1	2–1	4–3 P	1–2	5–2	—	—
Tölzer Löwen	Blue Devils Weiden	4–0	3–1	6–1	8–1	—	—	—
Blue Lions Leipzig	EV Füssen	6–8	5–7	6–3	3–4 OT	4–2	1–4	—
Wölfe Freiburg	Hannover Indians	2–1	4–8	3–5	3–5	4–2	6–4	6–3

==== Semi finals ====
Winners promoted to 2nd Bundesliga.

Team	Team	Game 1	Game 2	Game 3	Game 4	Game 5	Game 6	Game 7
Dresdner Eislöwen	EV Füssen	6–1	3–5	5–4	4–0	5–4 OT	—	—
Tölzer Löwen	Wölfe Freiburg	5–0	6–3	7–2	6–4	—	—	—

- The Tölzer Löwen and Dresdner Eislöwen are both promoted to the 2nd Bundesliga. The Dresdner Eislöwen are the 2007–08 Oberliga champions.

=== Play-downs ===
The Oberliga play-downs are also operating on a best-of-seven modus. The two groups determine separately one relegated team each, this being the losing teams of the second round.

==== First round ====
- North

Team	Team	Game 1	Game 2	Game 3	Game 4	Game 5	Game 6	Game 7
Saale Bulls Halle	Black Dragons Erfurt	12–4	6–1	6–2	7–2	—	—	—
Rote Teufel Bad Nauheim	Eisbären Juniors Berlin	2–1	0–1	4–3 OT	2–1	2–3	2–1 OT	—

- South

Team	Team	Game 1	Game 2	Game 3	Game 4	Game 5	Game 6	Game 7
Starbulls Rosenheim	EHF Passau Black Hawks	3–2	0–1	2–1	1–3	3–2	1–4	5–0
Deggendorf Fire	TEV Miesbach	6–2	3–4	5–3	3–2 OT	3–2 OT	—	—

==== Second round ====
Losing teams relegated to the LEV's.

- North

Team	Team	Game 1	Game 2	Game 3	Game 4	Game 5	Game 6	Game 7
Eisbären Juniors Berlin	Black Dragons Erfurt	6–3	6–2	5–1	6–0	—	—	—

- South

Team	Team	Game 1	Game 2	Game 3	Game 4	Game 5	Game 6	Game 7
TEV Miesbach	EHF Passau Black Hawks	6–2	2–5	5–1	1–3	4–1	6–3	—

- The Black Dragons Erfurt and EHF Passau Black Hawks are relegated to the LEV's. Due to the insolvency of Essen and Regensburg in the 2nd Bundesliga, Passau will remain in the league.

=== Play-off tree ===
First round
1st N	Dresdner Eislöwen	4
4th S	ESV Kaufbeuren	1
2nd N	Blue Lions Leipzig	2
3rd S	EV Füssen	4
2nd S	Wölfe Freiburg	4
3rd N	EC Hannover Indians	3
1st S	Tölzer Löwen	4
4th N	Blue Devils Weiden	0

Semi finals
1st N	Dresdner Eislöwen	4
3rd S	EV Füssen	1
2nd S	Wölfe Freiburg	0
1st S	Tölzer Löwen	4

Finals
1st N	Dresdner Eislöwen	*
1st S	Tölzer Löwen	*

- * Finals not played, the Dresdner Eislöwen declared champions due to winning both regular season games versus Tölzer Löwen.

== Leagues below the Oberliga ==
The levels below the Oberliga are not administrated by the DEB but rather by the local federations, the LEV's. With the ESBG's intention to increase the number of clubs in the Oberliga from 19 to 20 to balance both leagues, three promotion places will be available from the LEV's to this league in 2007–08. Should the DEL expand as well, another promotion spot would become available and it is planned to hand this one to the Regionalliga West. Only the three regional champions had the right for promotion but all clubs but the Herner EV declined:

- Regionalliga West: champions: Herner EV 2007, runners-up: EHC Dortmund
- Regionalliga Nordost: champions: EHV Schönheide, runners-up: ECC Preussen Juniors Berlin
- Bayernliga: champions: EHC Waldkraiburg, runners-up: EC Pfaffenhofen

=== Regionalliga West ===
The Regionalliga West is actually not quite a league but rather a promotion round. It contains the best six teams of the Regionalliga Nordrhein-Westfalen, and the top two teams of the Regionalliga Hessen and the Baden-Württemberg Liga each. The winner of this league is promoted to the Oberliga but this seasons runner-up, the EHC Dortmund may gain promotion to. As such, the league covers the German states of Baden-Württemberg, Hessen, Saarland, Rheinland-Pfalz and Nordrhein-Westfalen.

=== Regionalliga Nordost ===
This league covers the north and north east of Germany. Again, it is more of a promotion round, compromising ten teams from two groups, the northern and the north eastern group. The Regionalliga Nordost covers the German states of Niedersachsen, Bremen, Hamburg, Schleswig-Holstein, Mecklenburg-Vorpommern, Berlin, Sachsen-Anhalt, Sachsen and Thüringen.

=== Bayernliga ===
Main article see 2007–08 Bavarian ice hockey season

The Bayernliga is the only single-state league of the three, covering just Bavaria. The reason for this is that the state holds approximately one third of all ice hockey clubs in Germany and 18 of the 48 clubs in the first three divisions are from this federation.

- Source:"Alle Tabellen der Landesverbände (in German)". Hockeyweb.de.

== Sources ==
- Hockey Archives – International ice hockey website with tables and results (in French)
- Official website of the ESBG for the 2nd Bundesliga and Oberliga (in German)
- Official DEL website (in German)
