= 2008–09 Bavarian ice hockey season =

Bavarian ice hockey season 2008-09
- Nation
- Germany
- State
- Bavaria
- Promotion To
- Oberliga Süd
- Levels
- Bayernliga (IV)
- Landesliga (V)
- Bezirksliga (VI)
- Number of leagues
- 9
- Number of teams
- 80
- Champions
- ERV Schweinfurt

For the main article see Bavarian ice hockey leagues

The 2008-2009 Bavarian ice hockey season started on 17 October 2008 with the first round in the Bayernliga and finished on 22 March 2009 with the second Bayernliga final, with the ERV Schweinfurt taking out the title for a third time, having previously won it in 1990 and 2000.

Two clubs finished the season with only one loss to their name, the Bezirksliga and Landesliga champions TSV Schliersee and EHC Bayreuth, while the TSV Trostberg II was the only team not to record a win, having now not won a league game since January 2006.

== Champions ==
The three levels of the Bavarian league system were won by the following teams:

- Bayernliga: ERV Schweinfurt
- Landesliga: EHC Bayreuth
- Bezirksliga: TSV Schliersee

== Bayernliga ==
- The competition will be played, as in the years previously, with 16 teams, with the top eight qualified for the championship play-off and the bottom eight having to play-down to determine the two relegated teams. Differently from the previous season, the league did not enter the play-offs straight after the main round. Instead it played another group phase in four groups of four teams.

=== Main round: Final table ===
Position	Name	Played	Won	OTW	OTL	Lost	GF	GA	GD	Points
1	TSV Peißenberg	30	19	2	2	7	142	100	42	63
2	ERV Schweinfurt	30	16	5	1	8	169	127	42	59
3	Höchstadter EC	30	18	0	2	10	145	107	38	56
4	TSV Erding	30	16	2	1	11	137	104	33	53
5	ESC Dorfen	30	16	1	3	10	117	106	11	53
6	ESV Buchloe (N)	30	16	1	3	10	98	86	12	53
7	VER Selb	30	16	1	2	11	153	120	33	52
8	ECDC Memmingen	30	15	2	2	11	129	97	32	51
9	ERC Sonthofen	30	14	2	3	11	117	113	4	49
10	EHC Waldkraiburg	30	15	1	1	13	134	116	18	48
11	ESV Königsbrunn	30	11	5	2	12	108	104	4	45
12	Germering Wanderers	30	10	2	3	15	129	150	-21	37
13	EC Pfaffenhofen	30	7	3	2	18	113	144	-31	29
14	EV Pfronten	30	6	4	2	18	79	124	-45	28
15	EHC 80 Nürnberg	30	6	3	1	20	89	158	-69	25
16	EV Dingolfing (N)	30	5	0	4	21	85	188	-103	19

- Abbreviations: P = Games played, OTW = Overtime win, OTL = Overtime loss, GF = Goals for, GA = Goals against, GD = Goal difference, (N) = Promoted club

=== Group phase: Final table ===
==== Championship round ====
The eight teams qualified for this round were split into two groups; Group A consisted of the teams having finished 1st, 4th, 5th and 8th in the main round. Group B consisted of the 2nd, 3rd, 6th and 7th team. The top two teams of each group qualified for the play-off semi-finals.

- Group A

Position	Name	Played	Won	OTW	OTL	Lost	GF	GA	GD	Points
1	TSV Peißenberg	6	4	0	1	1	40	18	22	13
2	ESC Dorfen	6	4	0	0	2	21	24	-3	12
3	ECDC Memmingen	6	1	1	1	3	17	27	-10	6
4	TSV Erding	6	1	1	0	4	22	31	-9	5

- Group B

Position	Name	Played	Won	OTW	OTL	Lost	GF	GA	GD	Points
1	ERV Schweinfurt	6	4	0	0	2	34	23	11	12
2	Höchstadter EC	6	3	1	0	2	29	19	10	11
3	VER Selb	6	2	0	1	3	18	32	-14	7
4	ESV Buchloe	6	2	0	0	4	20	27	-7	6

==== Relegation round ====
The eight teams qualified for this round were also split into two groups. Group A consisted of the teams having finished 9th, 12th, 13th and 16th in the main round. Group B consisted of the 10th, 11th, 14th and 15th team. The bottom two teams of each group had to enter the play-downs while the top two teams were qualified for next seasons Bayernliga.

- Group A

Position	Name	Played	Won	OTW	OTL	Lost	GF	GA	GD	Points
1	EC Pfaffenhofen	6	4	0	1	1	27	27	0	13
2	EV Dingolfing	6	3	1	0	2	24	18	6	11
3	Wanderers Germering	6	2	0	0	4	18	23	-5	6
4	ERC Sonthofen	6	2	0	0	4	20	21	-1	6

- Group B

Position	Name	Played	Won	OTW	OTL	Lost	GF	GA	GD	Points
1	EHC Waldkraiburg	6	5	1	0	0	37	16	21	17
2	EV Pfronten	6	3	0	0	3	21	23	-2	9
3	ESV Königsbrunn	6	2	0	1	3	16	15	1	7
4	EHC 80 Nürnberg	6	1	0	0	5	14	34	-20	3

=== Play-Offs ===
The semi-finals and the final are played in a best-of-three modus.

==== Semi finals ====
Team	Team	Game 1	Game 2	Game 3
TSV Peißenberg	Höchstadter EC	5-2	2-4	6-5
ERV Schweinfurt	ESC Dorfen	6-3	3-2	

==== Finals ====
- Championship:

Team	Team	Game 1	Game 2	Game 3
TSV Peißenberg	ERV Schweinfurt	4-6	2-6	

- The ERV Schweinfurt is the 2008-09 Bayernliga champions.

=== Play-Downs ===
==== Semi finals ====
Team	Team	Game 1	Game 2	Game 3
Wanderers Germering	EHC 80 Nürnberg	1-7	4-5	
ESV Königsbrunn	ERC Sonthofen	6-7	5-7	

==== Final ====
Team	Team	Game 1	Game 2
ERC Sonthofen	EHC 80 Nürnberg	7-1	5-1

== Landesliga ==
The four regional divisions played out a home-and-away round to determine the four clubs from each league who enter the sixteen team promotion round. Split into two groups of eight, the top team of each division gains promotion to the Bayernliga. Should one or more teams from this league move up to the Oberliga without a Bavarian team being relegated from there, additional clubs from that round may gain promotion.

The remaining sixteen clubs played out a relegation round with the last two team in each of the two groups being relegated to the Bezirksliga.

=== First round ===
Top four teams enter the promotion round.

- Landesliga Nord

Position	Name	Played	Won	Drawn	Lost	GF	GA	GD	Points
1	EHC Bayreuth	14	11	2	1	122	28	94	24
2	EV Regensburg (R)	14	11	0	3	111	38	73	22
3	1. EV Weiden (R)	14	10	1	3	92	37	55	21
4	ESC Hassfurt	14	8	1	5	105	63	42	17
5	EV Pegnitz	14	7	2	5	91	76	15	16
6	ERSC Amberg	14	3	1	10	46	117	-71	7
7	EC Amberg (N)	14	1	1	12	41	127	-86	3
8	EHC Stiftland-Mitterteich	14	1	0	13	36	158	-122	2

  - The EV Regensburg was forced to resign from the 2nd Bundesliga due to insolvency.
  - The 1. EV Weiden voluntarily withdrew from the Oberliga to the Landesliga
- Landesliga Süd

Position	Name	Played	Won	Drawn	Lost	GF	GA	GD	Points
1	EHC Bad Aibling	14	10	2	2	81	55	26	22
2	ESC Holzkirchen	14	10	1	3	77	41	36	21
3	TSV Trostberg	14	8	2	4	73	61	12	18
4	ESC Riverrats Geretsried	14	6	3	5	61	57	4	15
5	SC Reichersbeuren	14	6	2	6	67	66	1	14
6	EC Bad Tölz II	14	3	5	6	54	59	-5	11
7	ERSC Ottobrunn	14	2	5	7	44	68	-24	9
8	EV Mittenwald (N)	14	1	0	13	38	88	-50	2

- Landesliga Ost

Position	Name	Played	Won	Drawn	Lost	GF	GA	GD	Points
1	SVG Burgkirchen	14	11	2	1	109	54	55	24
2	ESC Vilshofen	14	9	3	2	78	31	47	21
3	ESV Gebensbach	14	9	1	4	61	40	21	19
4	EV Moosburg	14	9	0	5	76	45	31	18
5	EHC Straubing II	14	6	1	7	41	55	-14	13
6	EK München	14	4	0	10	39	89	-50	8
7	EHC Regensburg (N)	14	2	1	11	50	88	-38	5
8	SE Freising	14	2	0	12	43	95	-52	4

- Landesliga West

Position	Name	Played	Won	Drawn	Lost	GF	GA	GD	Points
1	EV Lindau	14	12	2	0	95	31	64	26
2	EA Schongau	14	9	4	1	96	43	53	22
3	ERC Lechbruck	14	8	1	5	71	62	9	17
4	ESV Burgau	14	7	1	6	60	74	-14	15
5	EV Fürstenfeldbruck (R)	14	5	3	6	62	66	-4	13
6	SC Forst	14	6	0	8	58	75	-17	12
7	ESC Kempten (N)	14	3	1	10	44	84	-40	7
8	EV Bad Wörishofen	14	0	0	14	40	91	-51	0

- (R) denotes team relegated from the Bayernliga after previous season.
- (N) denotes team promoted from the Bezirksliga after previous season.

=== Promotion round ===
Top team in each division promoted to the Bayernliga. The second placed teams may have a promotion chance if a Bavarian team is promoted from the Bayernliga to the Oberliga.

- Group A

Position	Name	Played	Won	Drawn	Lost	GF	GA	GD	Points
1	EV Regensburg	14	13	2	0	92	19	73	27
2	EV Lindau	14	12	0	2	106	26	80	24
3	1. EV Weiden	14	9	2	3	73	42	31	20
4	ESC Vilshofen	14	5	3	6	57	60	-3	13
5	ESC Riverrats Geretsried	14	4	1	9	53	81	-28	9
6	EHC Bad Aibling	14	4	0	10	52	110	-58	8
7	ESV Burgau	14	3	1	10	44	95	-51	7
8	ESV Gebensbach	14	1	2	11	46	90	-44	4

- Group B

Position	Name	Played	Won	Drawn	Lost	GF	GA	GD	Points
1	EHC Bayreuth	14	13	1	0	85	20	65	27
2	SVG Burgkirchen	14	10	1	3	71	51	20	21
3	ESC Hassfurt	14	8	0	6	68	41	27	16
4	EA Schongau	14	7	1	6	58	47	11	15
5	ESC Holzkirchen	14	5	0	9	51	64	-13	10
6	ERC Lechbruck	14	5	0	9	48	85	-37	10
7	EV Moosburg	14	4	0	10	37	80	-43	8
8	TSV Trostberg	14	2	1	11	52	77	-25	5

==== Finals ====
The two division winners will play a two match series to determine the Landesliga champions while the two division runners-up will play for third place, which could also determine who will be promoted if a third team was to move up to the Bayernliga.

- Third place

Team	Team	Game 1	Game 2
SVG Burgkirchen	EV Lindau	0-5	6-7

- Championship

Team	Team	Game 1	Game 2
EHC Bayreuth	EV Regensburg	5-1	2-1

=== Relegation round ===
The two bottom teams in each division are relegated to the Bezirksliga.

- Group North/East

Position	Name	Played	Won	Drawn	Lost	GF	GA	GD	Points
1	EV Pegnitz	14	13	0	1	126	54	72	26
2	EHC Straubing II	14	9	0	5	59	53	6	18
3	EC Amberg	14	6	3	5	81	76	5	15
4	EK München	14	7	1	6	57	67	-10	15
5	SE Freising	14	6	1	7	78	73	5	13
6	ERSC Amberg	14	6	1	7	68	87	-19	13
7	EHC Regensburg	14	4	1	9	66	87	-21	9
8	EHC Stiftland-Mitterteich	14	1	1	12	60	98	-38	3

- Group South/West

Position	Name	Played	Won	Drawn	Lost	GF	GA	GD	Points
1	SC Forst	14	11	0	3	77	52	25	22
2	EV Fürstenfeldbruck	14	9	1	4	68	46	22	19
3	SC Reichersbeuern	14	9	1	4	76	54	22	19
4	EC Bad Tölz II	14	8	2	4	61	43	18	18
5	ESC Kempten	14	6	2	6	66	66	0	14
6	ERSC Ottobrunn	14	5	2	7	52	66	-14	12
7	EV Bad Wörishofen	14	2	0	12	48	79	-31	4
8	EV Mittenwald	14	2	0	12	38	80	-42	4

== Bezirksliga ==
The four regional division played out a home-and-away round to determined the league winner. The four league champions are promoted to the Landesliga and also are qualified for the Bezirksliga championship round.

=== Main round ===
First placed team enters championship round and is promoted to Landesliga.

- Bezirksliga Nord

Position	Name	Played	Won	Drawn	Lost	GF	GA	GD	Points
1	ERC Ingolstadt								
2	ESV Würzburg (R)								
3	VER Selb II (N)								
4	EC Erkersreuth								
5	EC Pfaffenhofen II								
6	Höchstadter EC II (N)								
7	EC Bad Kissing								

- Bezirksliga Süd

Position	Name	Played	Won	Drawn	Lost	GF	GA	GD	Points
1	TSV Schliersee								
2	SC Gaißach								
3	Star Bulls Rosenheim II (N)								
4	EHC Waldkraiburg II								
5	EV Berchtesgaden								
6	DEC Frillensee (R)								
7	Germering Wanderers II								
8	TSV Trostberg II								

- Bezirksliga Ost

Position	Name	Played	Won	Drawn	Lost	GF	GA	GD	Points
1	ESV Waldkirchen								
2	ERC Regen								
3	EV Bruckberg								
4	EV Aich								
5	Deggendorfer SC II								
6	SG EK/EHC München (R)								
7	EV Dingolfing II								
8	Dynamo Dingolfing								

- Bezirksliga West

Position	Name	Played	Won	Drawn	Lost	GF	GA	GD	Points
1	1. EC Senden								
2	SV Apfeldorf								
3	EC Oberstdorf								
4	VfL Denklingen								
5	ESV Bad Bayersoien								
6	SV Hohenfurch								
7	EG Wood Augsburg								
8	ESV Buchloe II								
9	ASV Dachau								

=== Championship round ===
The Bezirksliga championship was decided in a home-and-away round with the club with the best aggregate score taking out the series. All four teams are already promoted to the Landesliga.

==== Semi finals ====
Team	Team	Game 1	Game 2
ERC Ingolstadt	TSV Schliersee	5-5	2-3 aet
1. EC Senden	ESV Waldkirchen	6-1	5-14

==== Finals ====
- Third place:

Team	Team	Game 1	Game 2
ERC Ingolstadt	1. EC Senden	4-7	5-10

- Championship:

Team	Team	Game 1	Game 2
ESV Waldkirchen	TSV Schliersee	3-3	3-7

- The TSV Schliersee is the 2008-09 Bavarian Bezirksliga champion.

== Sources ==
- Bayrischer Eissport Verband- Official Bavarian ice hockey website
- Hockey Archives - International ice hockey website with tables and results (in French)
- Bayernhockey-Inoffical website on Bavarian ice hockey
