= 2006–07 Bavarian ice hockey season =

Bavarian ice hockey season 2006-07
- Nation
- Germany
- State
- Bavaria
- Promotion To
- Oberliga Süd
- Levels
- Bayernliga (IV)
- Landesliga (V)
- Bezirksliga (VI)
- Number of leagues
- 9
- Number of teams
- 79
- Champions
- EHF Passau

For the main article see Bavarian ice hockey leagues

The Bavarian ice hockey league season 2006-07 started on 20 October 2006 with the first round in the Bayernliga and finished on 23 March 2007 with the third league final. It saw the EHF Passau take out the Bavarian title. The EHF, along with the runner-up Deggendorfer SC were accepted into the Oberliga for the 2007-08 season.

No team remained undefeated all season or managed to suffer only one loss. Three clubs hold the joint record of two defeats only, those being the VER Selb, Wanderers Germaring and ESV Gebensbach. Also, three clubs remained winless all season, those being the EV Bruckberg, TSV Trostberg II and EC Pfaffenhofen II.

== Champions ==
The three levels of the Bavarian league system were won by the following teams:

- Bayernliga: EHF Passau
- Landesliga: EHC Nürnberg
- Bezirksliga: ESV Gebensbach

== Bayernliga ==
- The competition was played, as in the years previously, with 16 teams, with the top eight qualified for the championship play-off and the bottom eight having to play-down to determine the two relegated teams.

=== Final table ===
Position	Name	Played	Won	Drawn	Lost	GF	GA	GD	Points
1	EHF Passau (N)	30	22	3	5	137	60	77	47
2	Deggendorfer SC	30	21	4	5	153	106	47	46
3	EC Pfaffenhofen	30	20	2	8	152	115	37	42
4	TSV Peißenberg	30	20	1	9	160	105	55	41
5	TSV Erding	30	18	5	7	128	90	38	41
6	ERV Schweinfurt (N)	30	17	4	9	149	117	32	38
7	EHC Waldkraiburg	30	17	0	13	122	97	25	34
8	Höchstadter EC	30	14	3	13	118	120	-2	31
9	ESV Königsbrunn	30	13	3	14	114	117	-3	29
10	ECDC Memmingen	30	11	6	13	113	113	0	28
11	ESC Dorfen	30	12	4	14	120	123	-3	28
12	ERC Sonthofen	30	8	2	20	92	135	-43	18
13	EV Pegnitz	30	5	6	19	115	165	-50	16
14	EC Ulm/Neu Ulm (N)	30	6	3	21	83	125	-42	15
15	SVG Burgkirchen	30	7	1	22	90	185	-95	15
16	EV Fürstenfeldbruck	30	5	1	24	76	149	-73	11

- (N) denotes team promoted from the Landesliga after the previous season.

=== Play-Offs ===
All rounds of the play-offs were carried out in a best-of-three modus. The winner of the final was crowned Bayrischer Meister (English:Bavarian champions).

==== First round ====
Team	Team	Game 1	Game 2	Game 3
EHF Passau	Höchstadter EC	5-2	3-1	
Deggendorfer SC	EHC Waldkraiburg	5-4	5-2	
EC Pfaffenhofen	ERV Schweinfurt	4-6	4-6	
TSV Peißenberg	TSV Erding	5-4	5-2	

==== Semi finals ====
Team	Team	Game 1	Game 2	Game 3
EHF Passau	ERV Schweinfurt	5-2	2-4	8-0
Deggendorfer SC	TSV Peißenberg	10-3	3-6	4-2

==== Finals ====
- Third place:

Team	Team	Game 1	Game 2	Game 3
TSV Peißenberg	ERV Schweinfurt	8-3	5-4	

- Championship:

Team	Team	Game 1	Game 2	Game 3
EHF Passau	Deggendorfer SC	3-5	4-3	4-2

- The EHF Passau wins the Bavarian championship for the 2006-07 season.

=== Play-Downs ===
Both rounds were played in a best-of-three modus. The losing semi-finalists are relegated to the Landesligas.

==== First round ====
Team	Team	Game 1	Game 2	Game 3
ESV Königsbrunn	EV Fürstenfeldbruck	3-0	2-3	2-1
ECDC Memmingen	SVG Burgkirchen	7-4	1-2	12-1
ESC Dorfen	EC Ulm/Neu Ulm	3-2	1-4	5-4
ERC Sonthofen	EV Pegnitz	4-1	2-4	7-4

==== Semi finals ====
Team	Team	Game 1	Game 2	Game 3
EV Pegnitz	EV Fürstenfeldbruck	5-4	4-10	2-3
EC Ulm/Neu Ulm	SVG Burgkirchen	6-3	4-1	

- The EV Pegnitz and SVG Burgkirchen are relegated to the Landesliga.

=== Top scorers ===
==== Main round ====
Place	Name	Team	Games	Points
1	(Germany) Thomas Greilinger	Deggendorfer SC	29	80
2	(Russia) Sergej Waßmiller	ERV Schweinfurt	30	75
3	(Slovakia) Roman Mucha	EC Peiting	29	74

==== Play-Offs ====
Place	Name	Team	Games	Points
1	(Germany) Thomas Greilinger	Deggendorfer SC	8	18
2	(Czech Republic) Marek Pospisil	TSV Peißenberg	7	13
3	(Germany) Enrico Kock	Deggendorfer SC	8	12

== Landesliga ==
The four regional divisions played out a home-and-away round to determined the top four clubs who entered the promotion round. The promotion round groups were mixed, with one club each from the four divisions. The bottom four entered a relegation round with the last club from there being relegated to the Bezirksliga.

The winner of each of the four promotion rounds entered the Landesliga finals. The two winners of the semi-finals were promoted to the Bayernliga. Because two teams from the Bayernliga were promoted to the Oberliga and none relegated, an additional two promotion spots became available and in the end all four finalists were promoted.

=== First round ===
Top four teams enter the promotion round.

- Landesliga Nord

Position	Name	Played	Won	Drawn	Lost	GF	GA	GD	Points
1	VER Selb	14	11	2	1	119	34	85	24
2	ESC Hassfurt (N)	14	10	2	2	97	61	36	22
3	EHC 80 Nürnberg	14	9	1	4	103	56	47	19
4	ERSC Amberg	14	5	3	6	92	102	-10	13
5	EV Regensburg II	14	5	2	7	66	70	-4	12
6	EC Bad Kissing (N)	14	4	0	10	50	94	-44	8
7	EV Weiden II	14	2	3	9	29	82	-53	7
8	EHC Stiftland-Mitterteich	14	2	3	9	60	117	-57	7

- Landesliga Süd

Position	Name	Played	Won	Drawn	Lost	GF	GA	GD	Points
1	ESC Holzkirchen	14	11	1	2	97	49	48	23
2	SC Forst	14	10	1	3	59	47	12	21
3	TSV Trostberg	14	8	2	4	84	48	36	18
4	EC Bad Tölz II	14	7	2	5	66	57	9	16
5	ERSC Ottobrunn	14	6	1	7	54	53	1	13
6	DEC Frillensee-Inzell	14	5	0	9	60	96	-36	10
7	SC Reichersbeuren	14	4	1	9	46	60	-14	9
8	EHC München II (N)	14	1	0	13	41	97	-56	2

- Landesliga Ost
  - The 4th place was decided on the results of the games between the two involved clubs, 4-3 and 3-3 in Straubings favor.

Position	Name	Played	Won	Drawn	Lost	GF	GA	GD	Points
1	Wanderers Germering (R)	14	12	1	1	181	47	134	25
2	EV Dingolfing	14	11	0	3	102	36	66	22
3	ESC Vilshofen	14	9	2	3	101	50	51	20
4	EHC Straubing II	14	6	2	6	65	61	4	14
5	EV Moosburg	14	6	2	6	78	61	17	14
6	SE Freising	14	6	1	7	69	74	-5	13
7	EK München (N)	14	1	1	12	36	132	-96	3
8	EV Bruckberg	14	0	1	13	20	191	-171	1

- Landesliga West
  - The 4th place was decided on the results of the games between the two involved clubs, 5-0 and 2-5 in Burgaus favor.

Position	Name	Played	Won	Drawn	Lost	GF	GA	GD	Points
1	ESV Buchloe	14	11	1	2	64	31	33	23
2	EV Pfronten	14	9	3	2	69	39	30	21
3	EV Lindau	14	9	0	5	72	47	25	18
4	ESV Burgau	14	7	0	7	55	64	-9	14
5	EV Bad Wörishofen (N)	14	7	0	7	42	44	-2	14
6	TSV Kottern	14	5	1	8	55	49	6	11
7	EA Schongau (R)	14	3	2	9	40	67	-27	8
8	ERC Lechbruck	14	1	1	12	32	88	-56	3

- (R) denotes team relegated from the Bayernliga after previous season.
- (N) denotes team promoted from the Bezirksliga after previous season.

=== Promotion round ===
First placed team qualifies for the Landesliga championship.

- Group 1

Position	Name	Played	Won	Drawn	Lost	GF	GA	GD	Points
1	Wanderers Germering	6	6	0	0	58	23	35	12
2	ESC Hassfurt	6	3	0	3	39	39	0	6
3	TSV Trostberg	6	3	0	3	36	50	-14	6
4	ESV Burgau	6	0	0	6	19	40	-21	0

- Group 2

Position	Name	Played	Won	Drawn	Lost	GF	GA	GD	Points
1	EV Pfronten	6	5	0	1	29	21	8	10
2	ESC Holzkirchen	6	3	0	3	32	27	5	6
3	ESC Vilshofen	6	2	1	3	25	28	-3	5
4	ERSC Amberg	6	1	1	4	27	37	-10	3

- Group 3

Position	Name	Played	Won	Drawn	Lost	GF	GA	GD	Points
1	EHC 80 Nürnberg	6	5	0	1	32	14	18	10
2	ESV Buchloe	6	4	0	2	37	17	20	8
3	EV Dingolfing	6	3	0	3	19	24	-5	6
4	EC Bad Tölz II	6	0	0	6	15	48	-33	0

- Group 4

Position	Name	Played	Won	Drawn	Lost	GF	GA	GD	Points
1	VER Selb	6	5	1	0	40	10	30	11
2	EV Lindau	6	4	1	1	32	17	15	9
3	SC Forst	6	1	0	5	18	37	-19	2
4	EHC Straubing II	6	1	0	5	19	45	-26	2

=== Landesliga championship ===
==== Semi finals ====
Team	Team	Game 1	Game 2
EHC 80 Nürnberg	VER Selb	4-4	5-3
Wanderers Germering	EV Pfronten	9-1	5-3

==== Finals ====
- Third place:

Team	Team	Game 1	Game 2
VER Selb	EV Pfronten	8-1	3-0

- Championship:

Team	Team	Game 1	Game 2
Wanderers Germering	EHC 80 Nürnberg	6-7	5-5

- The EHC 80 Nürnberg is the Landesliga champion for the 2006-07 season. Together with the Wanderers Germering, EV Pfronten and VER Selb they are promoted to the Bayernliga.

=== Relegation round ===
The bottom team in each group is relegated to the Bezirksliga.

- Landesliga Nord
  - The last place was decided on the results of the games between the two involved clubs, 10-5 and 4-7 in Stiftland-Mitterteich favor.

Position	Name	Played	Won	Drawn	Lost	GF	GA	GD	Points
5	EV Regensburg II	6	5	0	1	43	19	24	10
6	EV Weiden II	6	3	0	3	30	30	0	6
7	EHC Stiftland-Mitterteich	6	2	0	4	32	38	-6	4
8	EC Bad Kissing	6	2	0	4	27	45	-18	4

- Landesliga Süd

Position	Name	Played	Won	Drawn	Lost	GF	GA	GD	Points
5	ERSC Ottobrunn	6	5	0	1	31	12	19	10
6	SC Reichersbeuren	6	3	1	2	21	17	4	7
7	EHC München II	6	2	0	4	28	40	-12	4
8	DEC Frillensee-Inzell	6	1	1	4	21	32	-11	3

- Landesliga Ost

Position	Name	Played	Won	Drawn	Lost	GF	GA	GD	Points
5	SE Freising	6	5	0	1	54	23	31	10
6	EV Moosburg	6	5	0	1	51	24	27	10
7	EK München	6	2	0	4	30	39	-9	4
8	EV Bruckberg	6	0	0	6	17	66	-49	0

- Landesliga West
  - The last place was decided on the results of the games between the two involved clubs, 10-3 and 3-5 in Kotterns favor.

Position	Name	Played	Won	Drawn	Lost	GF	GA	GD	Points
5	EA Schongau	6	4	0	2	26	21	5	8
6	EV Bad Wörishofen	6	2	2	2	21	29	-8	6
7	TSV Kottern *	6	2	1	3	26	21	5	5
8	ERC Lechbruck	6	2	1	3	31	33	-2	5

- The EC Bad Kissing and EV Bruckberg are relegated to the Bezirksliga.
- The TSV Kottern withdraws from the Bavarian ice hockey leagues, its ice hockey department joins the new ESC Kempten.
- The DEC Frillensee-Inzell and ERC Lechbruck are not relegated because four Landesliga teams are promoted to the Bayernliga and therefore extra places in the Landesliga are available.

== Bezirksliga ==
The four regional division played out a home-and-away round to determined the league winner. The four league champions are nominally promoted to the Landesliga and also are qualified for the Bezirksliga championship round.

=== Main round ===
First placed team enters championship round.

- Bezirksliga Nord

Position	Name	Played	Won	Drawn	Lost	GF	GA	GD	Points
1	EHC Bayreuth (N)	14	11	2	1	118	46	72	24
2	ESV Würzburg	14	10	3	1	107	51	56	23
3	ERC Ingolstadt II	14	8	3	3	76	55	21	19
4	EC Amberg (N)	14	8	2	4	88	69	19	18
5	EHC Regensburg	14	5	2	7	77	88	-11	12
6	EC Erkersreuth (R)	14	5	2	7	56	73	-17	12
7	Deggendorfer SC II	14	1	1	12	46	96	-50	3
8	EC Pfaffenhofen II (N)	14	0	1	13	43	133	-90	0

- Bezirksliga Süd
  - The first place was decided on the results of the games between the two involved clubs, 5-2 and 4-4 in Geretsrieds favor

Position	Name	Played	Won	Drawn	Lost	GF	GA	GD	Points
1	ESC Riverrats Geretsried (R)	14	11	1	2	108	44	64	23
2	EHC Bad Aibling	14	11	1	2	115	36	79	23
3	SC Gaißach	14	11	0	3	104	57	47	22
4	EV Mittenwald	14	7	2	5	76	47	29	16
5	TSV Schliersee	14	6	2	6	68	70	-2	14
6	EHC Waldkraiburg II	14	3	1	10	50	102	-52	7
7	EV Berchtesgaden	14	3	0	11	76	101	-25	6
8	TSV Trostberg II	14	0	1	13	20	160	-140	1

- Bezirksliga Ost

Position	Name	Played	Won	Drawn	Lost	GF	GA	GD	Points
1	ESV Gebensbach (R)	12	10	0	2	92	25	67	20
2	ERC Regen	12	8	0	4	65	55	10	16
3	ESV Waldkirchen	12	7	1	4	91	52	39	15
4	ASV Dachau	12	7	1	4	92	62	30	15
5	Wanderers Germering II (N)	12	4	0	8	59	75	-16	8
6	EV Aich	12	4	0	8	43	87	-44	8
7	Dynamo Dingolfing	12	1	0	11	42	128	-86	2

- Bezirksliga West

Position	Name	Played	Won	Drawn	Lost	GF	GA	GD	Points
1	VfL Denklingen	14	11	0	2	87	51	36	24
2	ESV Bad Bayersoien	14	11	1	2	79	43	36	23
3	SV Hohenfurch	14	8	0	6	69	45	24	16
4	EC Oberstdorf	14	7	1	6	64	50	14	15
5	1. EC Senden	14	7	1	6	64	75	-11	15
6	ESV Türkheim	14	4	0	10	45	71	-26	8
7	EG Wood Augsburg	14	3	1	10	66	90	-24	7
8	SV Apfeldorf	14	1	2	11	37	86	-49	3

- (R) denotes team relegated from the Landesliga after previous season.
- (N) denotes team has newly entered the league system.

=== Championship round ===
The Bezirksliga championship was decided in a home-and-away round with the club with the best aggregate score taking out the series. Nominally, all four teams are already promoted to the Landesliga, however, the VfL Denklingen was not.

==== Semi finals ====
Team	Team	Game 1	Game 2
ESV Gebensbach	EHC Bayreuth	5-3	3-1
VfL Denklingen	ESC Riverrats Geretsried	5-3	5-4

==== Final ====
Team	Team	Game 1	Game 2
ESV Gebensbach	VfL Denklingen	2-0	5-2

- The ESV Gebensbach is the 2006-07 Bavarian Bezirksliga champion. The ESC Riverrats Geretsried and EHC Bayreuth are also promoted to the Landesliga.
- The ESV Würzburg and EHC Bad Aibling are also promoted.
- The VfL Denklingen was not promoted.

== Sources ==
- Bayrischer Eissport Verband- Official Bavarian ice hockey website
- Hockey Archives - International ice hockey website with tables and results (in French)
- Bayernhockey-Inoffical website on Bavarian ice hockey
