= 2007–08 Bavarian ice hockey season =

Bavarian ice hockey season 2007-08
- Nation
- Germany
- State
- Bavaria
- Promotion To
- Oberliga Süd
- Levels
- Bayernliga (IV)
- Landesliga (V)
- Bezirksliga (VI)
- Number of leagues
- 9
- Number of teams
- 79
- Champions
- EHC Waldkraiburg

For the main article see Bavarian ice hockey leagues

The Bavarian ice hockey league season 2007-08 started on 19 October 2007 with the first round in the Bayernliga and finished on 14 March 2008 with the third league final. It saw the EHC Waldkraiburg take out its second Bavarian title, having previously won it in 1987–88, then under the name of VfL Waldkraiburg. The club could have taken up promotion to the Oberliga but declined. The EV Weiden voluntarily withdrew from the Oberliga while Regensburg was forced to resign from the 2nd Bundesliga due to insolvency.

The Bayernliga season saw the EC Ulm/Neu-Ulm fold after 16 rounds, unable to complete its schedule.

No team remained unbeaten this season, the ESC Kempten in the Bezirksliga West held the best record with 19 wins and one defeat. Two teams, both from the Bezirksliga, remained winless all season, the SG München and the TSV Trostberg II. For the latter, it was the second winless season in a row, having only ever won one game since joining the league in 2005.

== Champions ==
The three levels of the Bavarian league system were won by the following teams:

- Bayernliga: EHC Waldkraiburg
- Landesliga: ESV Buchloe
- Bezirksliga: SC Gaißach

== Bayernliga ==
- The competition was played, as in the years previously, with 16 teams, with the top eight qualified for the championship play-off and the bottom eight having to play-down to determine the two relegated teams.

=== Final table ===
Position	Name	Played	Won	Drawn	Lost	GF	GA	GD	Points
1	EHC Waldkraiburg	30	22	2	6	180	81	99	46
2	ECDC Memmingen	30	17	5	8	108	86	22	39
3	TSV Peißenberg	30	18	3	9	145	91	54	39
4	EC Pfaffenhofen	30	18	3	9	154	110	44	39
5	EHC 80 Nürnberg (N)	30	16	5	9	124	100	24	37
6	ERC Sonthofen	30	14	8	8	106	89	17	36
7	ERV Schweinfurt	30	14	6	10	138	96	42	34
8	ESV Königsbrunn	30	12	9	9	108	84	24	33
9	ESC Dorfen	30	13	6	11	114	104	10	32
10	TSV Erding	30	12	6	12	104	98	6	30
11	Höchstadter EC	30	11	6	13	115	122	-7	28
12	Germering Wanderers (N)	30	9	8	13	106	121	-15	26
13	VER Selb (N)	30	11	4	15	101	119	-18	26
14	EC Ulm/Neu Ulm *	30	7	3	20	45	125	-80	17
15	EV Pfronten (N)	30	2	6	22	78	189	-111	10
16	EV Fürstenfeldbruck	30	3	2	25	77	188	-111	8

- The EC Ulm/Neu Ulm folded in December 2007 for financial reasons, all games after this decision were counted as 0-5 losses for the club.
- (N) denotes team promoted from the Landesliga after the previous season.

=== Play-Offs ===
The first round of the play-offs was carried out in a best-of-five modus, after that it went to a best-of-three. The winner of the final is crowned Bayrischer Meister (English: Bavarian champions).

==== First round ====
Team	Team	Game 1	Game 2	Game 3	Game 4	Game 5
EHC Waldkraiburg	ESV Königsbrunn	4-1	6-3	8-4		
ECDC Memmingen	ERV Schweinfurt	2-6	4-7	0-2		
TSV Peißenberg	ERC Sonthofen	6-2	1-4	6-3	4-1	
EC Pfaffenhofen	EHC 80 Nürnberg	3-4	3-5	5-4	6-2	6-3

==== Semi finals ====
Team	Team	Game 1	Game 2	Game 3
EHC Waldkraiburg	ERV Schweinfurt	7-4	4-5	8-4
TSV Peißenberg	EC Pfaffenhofen	3-4	2-4	

==== Finals ====
- Third place:

Team	Team	Game 1	Game 2	Game 3
TSV Peißenberg	ERV Schweinfurt	3-9	4-3	7-2

- Championship:

Team	Team	Game 1	Game 2	Game 3
EHC Waldkraiburg	EC Pfaffenhofen	5-4	3-4	4-3

- The EHC Waldkraiburg wins the Bavarian championship for the 2007–08 season.

=== Play-Downs ===
The first round of the play-offs was carried out in a best-of-five modus, after that it went to a best-of-three. The EC Ulm/Neu-Ulm did not play any games, all games were awarded to the opposition. The two teams in the final are relegated to the Landesligas.

==== First round ====
Team	Team	Game 1	Game 2	Game 3	Game 4	Game 5
ESC Dorfen	EV Fürstenfeldbruck	5-3	7-4	7-4		
TSV Erding	EV Pfronten	5-4	9-1	16-1		
Höchstadter EC	EC Ulm/Neu Ulm	5-0	5-0	5-0		
Germering Wanderers	VER Selb	7-4	3-4	2-8	2-7	

==== Semi finals ====
Team	Team	Game 1	Game 2	Game 3
EC Ulm/Neu Ulm	EV Pfronten	0-5	0-5	
Germering Wanderers	EV Fürstenfeldbruck	5-3	9-5	

==== Final ====
Team	Team	Game 1	Game 2	Game 3
EC Ulm/Neu Ulm	EV Fürstenfeldbruck	0-5	0-5	

- Series not played, the EV Fürstenfeldbruck is relegated, the EC Ulm/Neu Ulm has folded.

=== Top scorers ===
==== Main round ====
Place	Name	Team	Games	Points
1	(Russia) Mikhail Nemirovsky	ERV Schweinfurt	29	78
2	(Canada) Martin Jiranek	EHC 80 Nürnberg	24	67
3	(Canada) Dale Crombeen	EHC Waldkraiburg	28	63

==== Play-Offs ====
Place	Name	Team	Games	Points
1	(Czech Republic) Marek Pospisil	TSV Peißenberg	10	17
2	(Germany) Thomas Maier	TSV Peißenberg	10	17
3	(Canada) Dale Crombeen	EHC Waldkraiburg	8	15

== Landesliga ==
The four regional divisions played out a home-and-away round to determine the two clubs from each league who enter the eight-team promotion round, The top two teams of this round gain promotion to the Bayernliga. Should one or more teams from this league move up to the Oberliga without a Bavarian team being relegated from there, additional clubs from that round may gain promotion.

The remaining six clubs in each league played out a relegation round with the last team in each of the four groups being relegated to the Bezirksliga.

From season to season, clubs can be moved between divisions to geographically balance out promotion and relegation. This explains, why three of the Landesligas have two newly promoted teams each while the western division has none in the 2007–08 season. The fact that six clubs moved up from the Bezirksliga to the Landesliga from the previous season results from the fact that four teams were promoted to the Bayernliga the previous season and therefore extra places were available to fill.

=== First round ===
Top two teams enter the promotion round.

- Landesliga Nord

Position	Name	Played	Won	Drawn	Lost	GF	GA	GD	Points
1	EHC Bayreuth (N)	14	13	0	1	105	30	75	26
2	ESC Hassfurt	14	11	0	3	117	43	74	22
3	EV Pegnitz (R)	14	10	0	4	81	51	30	20
4	ERSC Amberg	14	7	0	7	82	83	-1	14
5	EV Regensburg II	14	6	1	7	62	73	-11	13
6	ESV Würzburg (N)	14	3	0	11	58	99	-41	6
7	EV Weiden II	14	2	2	10	55	127	-72	6
8	EHC Stiftland-Mitterteich	14	2	1	11	43	97	-54	5

- Landesliga Süd

Position	Name	Played	Won	Drawn	Lost	GF	GA	GD	Points
1	ESC Holzkirchen	14	13	0	1	88	27	61	26
2	SC Reichersbeuren	14	10	0	4	83	47	36	20
3	TSV Trostberg	14	9	1	4	89	63	26	19
4	ESC Riverrats Geretsried (N)	14	7	1	6	71	54	17	15
5	ERSC Ottobrunn	14	5	2	7	58	38	20	12
6	EHC Bad Aibling (N)	14	5	1	8	56	84	-28	11
7	EC Bad Tölz II	14	3	3	8	51	71	-20	9
8	DEC Frillensee-Inzell	14	0	0	14	22	134	-112	0

- Landesliga Ost

Position	Name	Played	Won	Drawn	Lost	GF	GA	GD	Points
1	SVG Burgkirchen (R)	14	12	1	1	104	40	64	25
2	EV Dingolfing	14	11	0	3	87	27	60	22
3	EV Moosburg	14	8	2	4	73	47	26	18
4	ESC Vilshofen	14	6	2	6	61	55	6	14
5	SE Freising	14	6	2	6	60	58	2	14
6	ESV Gebensbach (N)	14	6	0	8	69	73	-4	12
7	EHC Straubing II	14	1	2	11	33	94	-61	4
8	EK München	14	1	1	12	37	130	-93	3

- Landesliga West

Position	Name	Played	Won	Drawn	Lost	GF	GA	GD	Points
1	ESV Buchloe	14	13	0	1	98	24	74	26
2	EV Lindau	14	11	0	3	77	30	47	22
3	EA Schongau	14	10	1	3	88	36	52	21
4	SC Forst	14	7	1	6	68	53	15	15
5	ESV Burgau	14	5	1	8	57	73	-16	11
6	EV Bad Wörishofen	14	4	2	8	50	61	-11	10
7	EHC München II	14	3	0	11	36	99	-63	6
8	ERC Lechbruck	14	0	1	13	24	122	-98	1

- (R) denotes team relegated from the Bayernliga after previous season.
- (N) denotes team promoted from the Bezirksliga after previous season.

=== Promotion round ===
Top two teams promoted to the Bayernliga.

Position	Name	Played	Won	Drawn	Lost	GF	GA	GD	Points
1	ESV Buchloe	14	10	2	2	62	29	33	22
2	EV Dingolfing	14	9	3	2	63	35	28	21
3	EHC Bayreuth	14	6	4	4	60	47	13	16
4	ESC Hassfurt	14	7	1	6	64	64	0	15
5	SVG Burgkirchen	14	7	1	6	60	61	-1	15
6	ESC Holzkirchen	14	6	1	7	40	43	-3	13
7	EV Lindau	14	2	2	10	46	70	-24	6
8	SC Reichersbeuren	14	2	0	12	43	89	-46	4

- The ESV Buchloe is the 2007-08 Bavarian Landesliga champion.

=== Relegation round ===
No points were taken from the first rounds competition. The bottom team in each group was relegated to the Bezirksliga, except the EK München, which was not.

- Landesliga Nord

Position	Name	Played	Won	Drawn	Lost	GF	GA	GD	Points
1	EV Pegnitz	9	7	0	2	74	43	31	14
2	ERSC Amberg	9	6	0	3	55	43	12	12
3	EV Regensburg II	10	5	1	4	51	44	7	11
4	EV Weiden II	10	5	0	5	50	53	-3	10
5	EHC Stiftland-Mitterteich	10	4	0	6	44	51	-7	8
6	ESV Würzburg	10	1	1	8	34	74	-30	3

- The game EV Pegnitz versus ERSC Amberg on 24 February 2008 was not played.
- Landesliga Süd

Position	Name	Played	Won	Drawn	Lost	GF	GA	GD	Points
1	TSV Trostberg	10	8	1	1	70	32	38	17
2	ESC Riverrats Geretsried	10	7	0	3	55	25	30	14
3	ERSC Ottobrunn	10	5	1	4	43	28	15	11
4	EC Bad Tölz II	10	5	0	5	44	37	7	10
5	EHC Bad Aibling	10	3	0	7	36	48	-12	6
6	DEC Frillensee-Inzell	10	1	0	9	14	92	-78	2

- Landesliga Ost

Position	Name	Played	Won	Drawn	Lost	GF	GA	GD	Points
1	EV Moosburg	10	7	2	1	67	30	37	16
2	ESC Vilshofen	10	8	0	2	49	22	27	16
3	ESV Gebensbach	10	6	0	4	54	44	10	12
4	EHC Straubing II	10	3	1	6	41	54	-13	7
5	SE Freising	10	2	2	6	34	48	-14	6
6	EK München	10	1	1	8	40	87	-47	3

- Landesliga West

Position	Name	Played	Won	Drawn	Lost	GF	GA	GD	Points
1	EA Schongau	10	10	0	0	63	26	37	20
2	SC Forst	10	6	1	3	48	24	24	13
3	ESV Burgau	10	4	1	5	39	42	-3	9
4	ERC Lechbruck	10	4	0	6	43	40	3	8
5	EV Bad Wörishofen	10	3	2	5	33	44	-11	8
6	EHC München II	10	1	0	9	26	76	-50	2

== Bezirksliga ==
The four regional divisions played out a home-and-away round to determine the league winner. The four league champions are promoted to the Landesliga and also are qualified for the Bezirksliga championship round.

=== Main round ===
The first-place team entered the championship round and was promoted to Landesliga. In addition, EHC Regensburg was promoted as best runner-up, taking the spot of the folded EC Ulm/Neu Ulm.

- Bezirksliga Nord

Position	Name	Played	Won	Drawn	Lost	GF	GA	GD	Points
1	EC Amberg	12	11	1	0	160	33	127	23
2	EHC Regensburg	12	10	0	2	145	24	121	20
3	EC Erkersreuth	12	7	1	4	96	62	34	15
4	ERC Ingolstadt	12	7	0	5	131	40	91	14
5	EC Pfaffenhofen II	12	4	0	8	64	86	-22	8
6	EC Bad Kissing (R)	12	2	0	10	33	143	-110	4
7	SG München (N)	12	0	0	12	9	250	-241	0

- Bezirksliga Süd

Position	Name	Played	Won	Drawn	Lost	GF	GA	GD	Points
1	SC Gaißach	12	9	2	1	83	38	45	20
2	EV Mittenwald	12	8	2	2	64	38	26	18
3	TSV Schliersee	12	7	2	3	69	35	34	16
4	EV Berchtesgaden	12	6	0	6	62	55	7	12
5	Germering Wanderers II	12	5	1	6	49	55	-6	11
6	EHC Waldkraiburg II	12	3	1	8	48	72	-24	7
7	TSV Trostberg II	12	0	0	12	20	102	-82	0

- Bezirksliga Ost

Position	Name	Played	Won	Drawn	Lost	GF	GA	GD	Points
1	EV Bruckberg (R)	14	9	2	3	70	44	26	20
2	ESV Waldkirchen	14	9	0	5	81	75	6	18
3	ERC Regen	14	8	1	5	67	53	14	17
4	Deggendorfer SC II	14	7	2	5	80	52	28	16
5	ASV Dachau	14	6	3	5	58	58	0	15
6	EHF Passau II (N)	14	5	1	8	58	84	-26	11
7	Dynamo Dingolfing	14	4	1	9	64	78	-14	9
8	EV Aich	14	3	0	11	41	75	-34	6

- Bezirksliga West

Position	Name	Played	Won	Drawn	Lost	GF	GA	GD	Points
1	ESC Kempten (N)	16	16	0	0	142	31	111	32
2	VfL Denklingen	16	11	1	4	92	60	32	23
3	ESV Bad Bayersoien	16	9	2	5	87	73	14	20
4	SV Hohenfurch	16	8	3	5	65	58	7	19
5	SV Apfeldorf	16	8	2	6	73	70	3	18
6	EG Wood Augsburg	16	4	2	10	54	91	-37	10
7	1. EC Senden	16	4	1	11	68	94	-26	9
8	EC Oberstdorf	16	2	3	11	60	104	-44	7
9	ESV Buchloe II (N)	16	2	2	12	53	113	-60	6

- (R) denotes team relegated from the Landesliga after previous season.
- (N) denotes team has newly entered the league system:
  - ESC Kempten is a new club, took over ice hockey department of TSV Kottern.
  - EHF Passau II and ESV Buchloe II are newly entered reserve teams.
  - SG München is actually the third team of EHC München.

=== Championship round ===
The Bezirksliga championship was decided in a home-and-away round with the club with the best aggregate score taking out the series. All four teams have already been promoted to the Landesliga.

==== Semi finals ====
Team	Team	Game 1	Game 2
ESC Kempten	EC Amberg	11-2	7-4
SC Gaißach	EV Bruckberg	13-2	4-4

==== Finals ====
- Third place:

Team	Team	Game 1	Game 2
EV Bruckberg	EC Amberg	3-14	1-25

- Championship:

Team	Team	Game 1	Game 2
ESC Kempten	SC Gaißach	4-8	5-4

- The SC Gaißach is the 2007-08 Bavarian Bezirksliga champion.

== Sources ==
- Bayrischer Eissport Verband- Official Bavarian ice hockey website
- Hockey Archives - International ice hockey website with tables and results (in French)
- Bayernhockey-Inoffical website on Bavarian ice hockey
