= Bavarian ice hockey leagues =

Part of the German ice hockey league system

- Nation
- Germany
- State
- Bavaria
- Promotion To
- Oberliga Süd
- Levels
- Bayernliga (IV)
- Landesliga (V)
- Bezirksliga (VI)
- Number of leagues
- 9
- Number of teams
- 80
- Current Champions 2007-08
- EHC Waldkraiburg

The Bavarian ice hockey leagues are part of the German ice hockey league system and form the tiers four to six of the league system in the state of Bavaria. The leagues are operated by the Bayrischer Eissport Verband, the Bavarian association for ice sports.

== Overview ==
The league system in Bavaria consists of three separate tiers, these being the Bayernliga (IV) (English:Bavarian League), Landesliga (V) (English:State League) and Bezirksliga (VI) (English:County League). The overall system has remained unchanged for a lengthy period of seasons.

The number of clubs, especially in the lowest tier, the Bezirksliga, can fluctuate due to teams joining and other teams leaving the league. This is mostly due to lack of players, or, the other extreme, an over supply of players and the need to form a reserves team. Occasionally, clubs fold, reform or re-enter the league system. In the current Bayernliga season, the EC 2000 Ulm/Neu-Ulm folded in December 2007, being unable to pay their players.

The Bayernliga champion earns the right to gain promotion to the Oberliga. At the end of the 2006-07 season, the runner-up was also promoted, which is an exception.

Until the end of the 1999-2000 season, the Bayernliga was only the fifth tier of the league system. The league between Oberliga and Bayernliga, the Regionalliga, was disbanded after this season and the majority of its clubs integrated into the Oberliga.

The Bavarian Eissport Verband (BEV) is the largest regional ice hockey association in Germany with 14.000 registered players in over 90 clubs. Apart from the 79 senior teams playing in its league system for the 2007-08 season, there is also eight women's teams and 284 junior teams. For this reason, the Bayernliga is the only statewide league whose champion directly qualifies for the Oberliga, all other leagues, the Regionalligas (English:Regional Leagues) cover larger areas or have to go through a promotion play-off round.

Above the BEV there are currently five Bavarian teams in the DEL (German Ice Hockey League) (I), two in the 2nd Bundesliga (II) and twelve in the Oberliga (III). This means, 19 of 56 clubs in the first three divisions of German ice hockey currently come from Bavaria.

== Ice hockey in Bavaria ==
Bavaria, especially the southern, mountainous region of it, is the "cradle" of German ice hockey with many former German internationals coming from there. Historically, the German championship was dominated by clubs from Bavaria and Berlin. Nowadays however, Bavarian teams rarely win a championship. The situation is actually very similar to the Canadian teams in the NHL, who provide the majority of players but win a minority of titles.

In 87 editions of the German championship until 2007, Bavarian clubs have won 35. Of the current DEL teams, none hold a German title to their name. In the 2nd Bundesliga, Landshut and Riessersee hold 12 titles between them and in the Oberliga, Füssen, Tölz and Rosenheim have earned 20 German championship between them. The EV Füssen is second only in numbers of titles to Berliner Schlittschuhclub, having won 16 German championships from 1949 to 1973.

One reason for the leading role Bavarian ice hockey had, and still to some extent has, is the number of ice hockey stadiums in the state. Almost 40 percent of all stadiums in Germany are in Bavaria and twice as many as in the second-ranked state Nordrhein-Westfalen:

State	Number
Bayern	73
Baden-Württemberg	24
Berlin	6
Brandenburg	0
Bremen	2
Hamburg	4
Hessen	10
Mecklenburg Vorpommern	4
Niedersachsen	10
Nordrhein Westfalen	35
Rheinland- Pfalz	8
Saarland	2
Sachsen	11
Sachsen- Anhalt	1
Schleswig- Holstein	2
Thüringen	1
Germany	193

Source:"Kunsteisbahnen Deutschland". Official DEB website. Archived from the original on 2008-03-25.

== Leagues & modus ==
The nine senior leagues split over three tiers, operating on the following modus:

=== Bayernliga ===
For the 2007-08 season, the Bayernliga sponsored the Bayer company operated in one single division of 16 clubs. The season went from October 2007 to March 2008.

Each team in the league played each other twice, home and away. at the end of the regular season, the top eight teams entered a play-off round. In a best-of-three modus, the winner of the Bayernliga was determined. The bottom eight teams also played a best-of-three play-down round to determine the two teams relegated to the Landesligas.

Until the end of the 1999-2000 season, the league operated on a fourteen club home-and-away season with no play-offs. From 2000, the strength of the league was increased to sixteen clubs in two regional groups of eight. After a first round, the top four of each group played another group stage, the championship group. The bottom four from each group did the same in a relegation group. From the 2002-03 season, play-offs were introduced after the championship round. The year after, the league moved to its current modus of a sixteen team home-and-away season with play-offs at the end.

=== Landesliga ===
Each of the four Landesligas played a regular season of home-and-away matches. The two first placed teams of each league then entered a championship round of eight teams. Again played in home-and-away modus, the top two teams of this round gain promotion to the Bayernliga. Should one or more teams from the Bayernliga gain entry to the Oberliga with a lesser number then that being relegated from the Oberliga to the Bayernliga, additional teams may be promoted from the Landesliga.

The other six teams in each of the four Landesligas played out another home-and-away round with the last placed team from each league being relegated to the corresponding Bezirksliga.

This modus for the 2007-08 season actually differs from the previous years, when after the first round of home-and-away games, the Landesligas were split into a top-four and a bottom-four group, with the latter determining the relegated team and the former playing for the group champion who would enter a four-team play-off for the Landesliga title and Bayernliga promotion.

=== Bezirksliga ===
In the Bezirksliga, the lowest level of play, each league again plays a home-and-away season. The winner of each 'Bezirksliga goes to the Bezirksliga championship where the four teams determined the champion of this level. Each of the four regional champions is also promoted to the corresponding Landesliga. For all other clubs in the Bezirksliga the season ends after the main round. there is no relegation as there is no league below the Bezirksliga.

== Bayernliga, Landesliga and Bezirksliga champions ==
On top of the division champions, each tier also plays out its level champions, the Bayernliga Meister, Landesliga Meister and Bezirksliga Meister.

=== Bayernliga ===
Season	Club
1975-76	EV Pegnitz
1976-77	TSV Königsbrunn
1977-78	TSV Farchant
1978-79	EA Schongau
1979-80	ESV Bayreuth
1980-81	SC Reichersbeuern
1981-82	ERSC Amberg
1982-83	ESV Burgau
1983-84	EV Dingolfing
1984-85	EC Hedos München
1985-86	EV Bad Wörishofen
1986-87	EV Pegnitz
1987-88	VfL Waldkraiburg
1988-89	EHC Bad Reichenhall
1989-90	ERV Schweinfurt
1990-91	EV Bad Wörishofen
1991-92	ETC Crimmitschau

Season	Club
1992-93	EC Pfaffenhofen
1993-94	ESC Dorfen
1994-95	Germering Wanderers
1995-96	ESC Dorfen
1996-97	ESV Bayreuth
1997-98	ESC München
1998-99	EHC Memmingen
1999–2000	ERV Schweinfurt
2000-01	Höchstadter EC
2001-02	EA Schongau
2002-03	EHC München
2003-04	Star Bulls Rosenheim
2004-05	EV Landsberg
2005-06	Höchstadter EC
2006-07	EHF Passau
2007-08	EHC Waldkraiburg
2008-09	ERV Schweinfurt

Season	Club
2009-10	TEV Miesbach
2010-11	ERC Sonthofen
2011-12	ERV Schweinfurt
2012-13	EHC Bayreuth
2013-14	ERC Sonthofen
2014-15	EV Lindau
2015-16	EHC Waldkraiburg
2016-17	EHC Waldkraiburg

- With the ETC Crimmitschau in 1992, a team from Sachsen won the Bayernliga.

=== Landesliga ===
Season	Club
1994-95	
1995-96	EV Dingolfing
1996-97	ESC München
1997-98	
1998-99	
1999–2000	EHC Waldkraiburg
2000-01	TSV Schliersee
2001-02	EV Landsberg
2002-03	TuS Geretsried II
2003-04	TSV Erding
2004-05	ECDC Memmingen
2005-06	EHF Passau
2006-07	EHC Nürnberg
2007-08	ESV Buchloe
2008-09	EHC Bayreuth

=== Bezirksliga ===
Season	Club
1994-95	ESV Bayreuth
1995-96	SC Reichersbeuern
1996-97	
1997-98	
1998-99	HC 1998 München
1999–2000	
2000-01	EV Landsberg
2001-02	BTS Bayreuth
2002-03	TSV Erding
2003-04	TSV Kottern
2004-05	ERC Selb
2005-06	EC Bad Kissing
2006-07	ESV Gebensbach
2007-08	SC Gaißach
2008-09	TSV Schliersee

- The 2000-01 Bezirksliga final saw the clash of two Bavarian "giants". The two re-formed clubs, SB Rosenheim and EV Landsberg both didn't lose a regular season game and remained unbeaten in the semi-finals, Landsberg having scored 234 goals in 14 matches and Rosenheim 164 in 12. Landsberg then went on to win both final games finishing on a 16-0-0 record with 247 goals for and 15 goals against. A year later, the situation repeated itself quite similar in the Landesliga, with the EVL again dominating.

== Divisionial champions ==
The Landsliga and Bezirksliga are subdivided in four divisions each with the following divisional champions:

=== Landesliga ===
Season	North	South	East	West
2000-01	ESV Würzburg	TSV Schliersee	EV Regensburg II	EV Lindau
2001-02	EV Pegnitz	SB Rosenheim	Germering Wanderers	EV Landsberg
2002-03	EV Pegnitz	TuS Geretsried II	EV Bruckberg	Germering Wanderers
2003-04	EV Pegnitz	EV Fürstenfeldbruck	TSV Erding Jets	TSV Peißenberg
2004-05	EHC Nürnberg II	TSV Trostberg	Deggendorfer SC	ECDC Memmingen
2005-06	ERV Schweinfurt	ESC Holzkirchen	EHF Passau	EC Ulm/Neu-Ulm
2006-07	VER Selb	ESC Holzkirchen	Germering Wanderers	ESV Buchloe
2007-08	EHC Bayreuth	ESC Holzkirchen	SVG Burgkirchen	ESV Buchloe
2008-09	EHC Bayreuth	EHC Bad Aibling	SVG Burgkirchen	EV Lindau

=== Bezirksliga ===
Season	North	South	East	West
2000-01	EHC Regensburg	SB Rosenheim	Deggendorfer SC II	EV Landsberg
2001-02	BTS Bayreuth	TuS Geretsried II	Deggendorfer SC II	TSV Kottern
2002-03	EC Bayreuth	SC Riessersee II	TSV Erding Jets	TSV Peißenberg
2003-04	EHC Ingolstadt II	ESC Holzkirchen	EHF Passau	TSV Kottern
2004-05	VER Selb	EAC Bad Reichenhall	SE Freising	ERC Lechbruck
2005-06	EC Bad Kissingen	EHC München II	ESV Waldkirchen	EV Bad Wörishofen
2006-07	EHC Bayreuth	ESC Geretsried	ESV Gebensbach	VfL Denklingen
2007-08	EC Amberg	SC Gaißach	EV Bruckberg	ESC Kempten
2008-09	ERC Ingolstadt	TSV Schliersee	ESV Waldkirchen	1. EC Senden

== League system in the 2008-09 season ==
Level	League(s)/Division(s)			
IV	Bayernliga; 16 clubs			
V	Landesliga Nord; 8 clubs	Landesliga Süd; 8 clubs	Landesliga West; 8 clubs	Landesliga Ost; 8 clubs
VI	Bezirksliga Nord; 7 clubs	Bezirksliga Süd; 8 clubs	Bezirksliga West; 9 clubs	Bezirksliga Ost; 8 clubs

Source:"Bavarian ice hockey leagues". Fussball.de. Archived from the original on July 3, 2007.

== Placings in the Bayernliga 2000 to 2009 ==
Club	2000	2001	2002	2003	2004	2005	2006	2007	2008	2009
EHC München *		10	9	2	OL	OL	BL	BL	BL	BL
Star Bulls Rosenheim *	DEL			3	1	OL	OL	OL	OL	OL
EV Landsberg *	RL			1	2	1	OL	BL	BL	OL
EHF Passau								1	OL	OL
Deggendorfer SC *	OL	OL	OL				7	2	OL	OL
TSV Peissenberg *	RL	RL	RL			10	12	4	3	1
ERV Schweinfurt	1	RL	RL	OL	OL	OL		6	7	2
Höchstadter EC	3	1	RL	OL	OL	OL	1	8	11	3
TSV Erding *	OL	BL	OL			4	3	5	10	4
ESC Dorfen	RL	RL	RL	9	9	6	10	11	9	5
ESV Buchloe										6
VER Selb *	OL	OL	OL	OL	OL				13	7
ECDC Memmingen*	RL	RL	RL	OL			4	10	2	8
ERC Sonthofen		2	4	6	8	9	13	12	6	9
EHC Waldkraiburg		7	7	7	4	5	2	7	1	10
ESV Königsbrunn	9	4	2	5	13	14	6	9	8	11
Germering Wanderers					15		15		12	12
EC Pfaffenhofen	RL	5	5	8	6	2	14	3	4	13
EV Pfronten	5	9	6	15					15	14
EHC Nürnberg									5	15
EV Dingolfing	8	6	3	4	3	15				16
EC Ulm/Neu-Ulm *	OL			OL				14	14	
EV Fürstenfeldbruck	11	14	13	16		11	5	16	16	
EV Pegnitz						8	9	13		
SVG Burgkirchen *	12	8	10	11	10	7	16	15		
Geretsried Riverrats *	RL	OL	OL	OL	5	3	8			
EA Schongau	4	3	1	10	7	12	11			
Augsburger EV*	2	RL	RL	OL	11	13				
ERSC Ottobrunn	14	12	8	14	12	16				
ERC Lechbruck	7	13	12	12	14					
TSV Trostberg	6	11	11	13	16					
EV Lindau			14							
EV Regensburg II *			15							
EV Moosburg	10	16	16							
ESC Vilshofen	13	15								

Colour	Result
Gold	Bayernliga champion
Silver	Finalist
Green	Semi finalist
Blue	1st round
White	not qualified for play-offs

Colour	Explanation
RL	denotes club played in the Regionalliga (IV) (league now defunct)
OL	denotes club played in the Oberliga (III)
BL	denotes club played in the 2nd Bundesliga (II)
DEL	denotes club played in the Deutsche Eishockey Liga (I)

- The club Eishockeyclub HC 98 München was renamed in 2003 into EHC München.
- The SB Rosenheim as company were withdrew from the DEL in 2000 and the club Sportbund Rosenheim folded its ice sports department also in 2000. The newfounded club Starbulls Rosenheim had to restart in the Bezirksliga
- The EV Landsberg folded in 2000. The newfounded club EV Landsberg 2000 had to restart in the Bezirksliga and was renamed 2010 into EV Landsberg.
- The Deggendorfer EC folded in 2002. The teams of Deggendorfer EC changed to the other club Deggendorfer SC
- The Peissenberg Hornets as company were withdrew in 2001. The club TSV Peißenberg forwards the playing-mode of the Senior team, which had to restart in the Bezirksliga'.
- The Erding Jets folded as company in 2002. The club TSV Erding restarted the playing-mode of the Senior team in 2002 in the Bezirksliga.
- The EC Atlantis Ulm folded in 2003. The 2000 founded club EC Ulm 2000 folded in late 2007. The newfounded club VfE Ulm/Neu-Ulm started the playing-mode in 2007/08.
- The EHC Memmingen folded in 2003. The teams of EHC Memmingen changed to the other club ECDC Memmingen.
- The ERC Selb folded in 2004. The newfounded club VER Selb had to restart in the Bezirksliga.
- The Augsburger EV withdrew its team in 2005 and restart the playing-mode in 2010.
- The Mighty Dogs Schweinfurt as company were withdrew in 2005. The playing-mode were forwarded by the amateur team of ERV Schweinfurt in the Landesliga.
- The Geretsried River Rats as company were withdrew in 2003. The member of the ice sports department goes out of the club TuS Geretsried in 2006 and the newfounded club ESC Riverrats Geretsried had to restart in the Bezirksliga.
- The Eisbären Regensburg as company folded in 2008. The playing-mode were forward by the amateur team of EV Regensburg in the Landesliga.
- The club SV Gendorf was renamed after 2000 in SVG Burgkirchen and stopped the playing-mode of the Senior team in 2010 after losing the Possibility to Play in Burgkirchen at the River Alz.

== Bavarian clubs in the German league system ==
For the 2016-17 season, the following clubs from Bavaria played in the top three German leagues:

In the DEL:

- Thomas Sabo (Nürnberg) Ice Tigers
- Augsburger Panther
- Straubing Tigers
- Ingolstadt Panther
- EHC München

In the 2nd Bundesliga:

- Starbulls Rosenheim
- SC Riessersee

In the Oberliga:

- EC Bad Tölz
- EC Peiting
- ERC Sonthofen
- EV Landshut
- EHC Waldkraiburg
- EV Lindau
- EV Regensburg
- VER Selb
- Deggendorfer SC
- 1. EV Weiden
- EHV Schönheide
- Höchstädter EC

== See also ==
- Deutsche Eishockey Liga, the DEL
- 2nd Bundesliga
- Oberliga

== League seasons ==
- 2006-07 Bavarian ice hockey season
- 2007-08 Bavarian ice hockey season

== Sources ==
- Bayrischer Eissport Verband- Official Bavarian ice hockey website
- Hockey Archives - International ice hockey website with tables and results (in French)
- Private website on the history of Munich ice hockey
