= 2025–26 Champions Hockey League =

European ice hockey tournament

Tournament details
- Dates: 28 August 2025 – 3 March 2026
- Teams: 24

Final positions
- Champions: (Sweden) Frölunda HC (5th title)
- Runners-up: (Sweden) Luleå HF

Tournament statistics
- Games played: 101
- Goals scored: 557 (5.51 per game)
- Attendance: 359,300 (3,557 per game)
- Scoring leader: (Switzerland) Grégory Hofmann (13 points)

Awards
- MVP: (Sweden) Max Friberg

The 2025–26 Champions Hockey League was the 11th season of the Champions Hockey League, a European ice hockey tournament. The tournament was competed by 24 teams, with qualification being on sporting merits only. Apart from the reigning champion, the six founding leagues were represented by three teams each, while five "challenge leagues" were represented by one team each.

Swiss team ZSC Lions were the title holders having won their first Champions Hockey League title, defeating Swedish team Färjestad BK 2–1 in the 2025 final.

== Team allocation ==
A total of 24 teams from different European first-tier leagues participate in the league. Besides the title holders ZSC Lions, 18 teams from the six founding leagues, as well as the national champions from Denmark, France, Norway, Poland and the United Kingdom participate.

The qualification criteria for national leagues is based on the following rules:

1. CHL champions
2. National league champions (play-off winners)
3. Regular season winners
4. Regular season runners-up
5. Regular season third-placed team

Note: the national league champions of the United Kingdom are distinct from the national champions, who are determined in play-offs following the regular season.

=== Teams ===
Team	City/Area	League	Qualification	Participation	Previous best
(Switzerland) ZSC Lions	Zürich	National League	2025 CHL winners	9th	Champion
(Sweden) Luleå HF	Luleå	Swedish Hockey League	Play-off winners	6th	Champion
(Sweden) Brynäs IF	Gävle	Swedish Hockey League	Regular season winners	2nd	Quarter-finals
(Sweden) Frölunda HC	Gothenburg	Swedish Hockey League	Regular season third-place	9th	Champion
(Switzerland) Lausanne HC	Lausanne	National League	Regular season winners	4th	Quarter-finals
(Switzerland) SC Bern	Bern	National League	Regular season third place	7th	Quarter-finals
(Switzerland) EV Zug	Zug	National League	Regular season fourth place	9th	Semi-finals
(Germany) Eisbären Berlin	Berlin	Deutsche Eishockey Liga	Play-off winners	8th	Quarter-finals
(Germany) ERC Ingolstadt	Ingolstadt	Deutsche Eishockey Liga	Regular season winners	5th	Round of 16
(Germany) Fischtown Pinguins	Bremerhaven	Deutsche Eishockey Liga	Regular season third-place	3rd	Quarter-finals
(Czech Republic) Kometa Brno	Brno	Czech Extraliga	Play-off winners	3rd	Quarter-finals
(Czech Republic) Sparta Praha	Prague	Czech Extraliga	Regular season winners	7th	Final
(Czech Republic) Mountfield HK	Hradec Králové	Czech Extraliga	Regular season runners-up	5th	Final
(Finland) KalPa	Kuopio	Liiga	Play-off winners	5th	Round of 16
(Finland) Lukko	Rauma	Liiga	Regular season winners	6th	Semi-finals
(Finland) Ilves	Tampere	Liiga	Regular season runners-up	4th	Round of 16
(Austria) Red Bull Salzburg	Salzburg	ICE Hockey League	Play-off winners	10th	Semi-finals
(Austria) EC KAC	Klagenfurt	ICE Hockey League	Regular season winners	6th	Round of 16
(Italy) HC Bolzano	Bolzano	ICE Hockey League	Regular season third-place	5th	Round of 16
(United Kingdom) Belfast Giants	Belfast	Elite Ice Hockey League	Regular season winners	4th	Group stage
(Norway) Storhamar	Hamar	EliteHockey Ligaen	Play-off winners	4th	Round of 16
(France) Brûleurs de Loups	Grenoble	Ligue Magnus	Play-off winners	4th	Group stage
(Denmark) Odense Bulldogs	Odense	Metal Ligaen	Play-off winners	1st	—
(Poland) GKS Tychy	Tychy	Polska Hokej Liga	Play-off winners	3rd	Group stage

== Round and draw dates ==
The schedule of the competition is as follows.

Phase	Round	Draw date	First leg	Second leg
Group stage	Matchday 1	21 May 2025	28–29 August 2025	
Group stage	Matchday 2	21 May 2025	30–31 August 2025	
Group stage	Matchday 3	21 May 2025	4–5 September 2025	
Group stage	Matchday 4	21 May 2025	6–7 September 2025	
Group stage	Matchday 5	21 May 2025	7–8 October 2025	
Group stage	Matchday 6	21 May 2025	14–15 October 2025	
Playoff	Round of 16	No draw	11–12 November 2025	18–19 November 2025
Playoff	Quarter-finals	No draw	2–3 December 2025	16 December 2025
Playoff	Semi-finals	No draw	13–14 January 2026	20–21 January 2026
Playoff	Final	No draw	3 March 2026	

== Regular season ==
Teams in the 2025–26 Champions Hockey League.

In the regular season the 24 teams were combined into one table. Each team played home and away against six different opponents once. The best sixteen teams qualified to the round of 16.

The draw of the regular season took place on 21 May 2025 in Stockholm, Sweden.

=== Pots ===
The participating teams were seeded into Pots A to D according to their achievements in their national leagues and their respective league’s standing in the CHL league ranking. The reigning CHL champions ZSC Lions were the top seeded team and therefore given a place in pot A. The top pot also contained the reigning champions of four of the top five founding leagues according to the league rankings (Sweden, Germany, Czech Republic and Finland), as well as the 2024–25 NL regular season winners Lausanne HC. Pot D contained 2024–25 ICE Hockey League regular season third-placed HC Bolzano and champions of five challenger leagues.

Pot A	Pot B	Pot C	Pot D
(Switzerland) ZSC Lions (Sweden) Luleå HF (Switzerland) Lausanne HC (Germany) Eisbären Berlin (Czech Republic) Kometa Brno (Finland) KalPa	(Austria) Red Bull Salzburg (Sweden) Brynäs IF (Switzerland) SC Bern (Germany) ERC Ingolstadt (Czech Republic) Sparta Praha (Finland) Lukko	(Austria) EC KAC (Sweden) Frölunda HC (Switzerland) EV Zug (Germany) Fischtown Pinguins (Czech Republic) Mountfield HK (Finland) Ilves	(Italy) HC Bolzano (United Kingdom) Belfast Giants (Norway) Storhamar (France) Brûleurs de Loups (Denmark) Odense Bulldogs (Poland) GKS Tychy

=== Grid ===
A1	(Czech Republic) Kometa Brno	A2	(Switzerland) Lausanne HC	A3	(Sweden) Luleå HF	A4	(Germany) Eisbären Berlin	A5	(Switzerland) ZSC Lions	A6	(Finland) KalPa
B1	(Germany) ERC Ingolstadt	B2	(Switzerland) SC Bern	B3	(Finland) Lukko	B4	(Czech Republic) Sparta Praha	B5	(Austria) Red Bull Salzburg	B6	(Sweden) Brynäs IF
C1	(Czech Republic) Mountfield HK	C2	(Switzerland) EV Zug	C3	(Sweden) Frölunda HC	C4	(Germany) Fischtown Pinguins	C5	(Austria) EC KAC	C6	(Finland) Ilves
D1	(United Kingdom) Belfast Giants	D2	(Italy) HC Bolzano	D3	(France) Brûleurs de Loups	D4	(Poland) GKS Tychy	D5	(Norway) Storhamar	D6	(Denmark) Odense Bulldogs

=== League table ===
Pos	Team	Pld	W	OTW	OTL	L	GF	GA	GD	Pts	Qualification
1	(Finland) Ilves	6	6	0	0	0	24	7	+17	18	Qualification to playoffs
2	(Finland) KalPa	6	5	1	0	0	24	8	+16	17	Qualification to playoffs
3	(Sweden) Frölunda HC	6	5	0	0	1	21	11	+10	15	Qualification to playoffs
4	(Czech Republic) Sparta Praha	6	4	1	0	1	18	9	+9	14	Qualification to playoffs
5	(Finland) Lukko	6	4	0	1	1	21	14	+7	13	Qualification to playoffs
6	(Germany) ERC Ingolstadt	6	4	0	0	2	23	15	+8	12	Qualification to playoffs
7	(Switzerland) SC Bern	6	3	0	1	2	21	14	+7	10	Qualification to playoffs
8	(Czech Republic) Kometa Brno	6	3	0	1	2	21	22	−1	10	Qualification to playoffs
9	(Sweden) Luleå HF	6	2	1	2	1	13	13	0	10	Qualification to playoffs
10	(Sweden) Brynäs IF	6	3	0	0	3	14	10	+4	9	Qualification to playoffs
11	(Austria) Red Bull Salzburg	6	3	0	0	3	14	11	+3	9	Qualification to playoffs
12	(Norway) Storhamar	6	3	0	0	3	9	16	−7	9	Qualification to playoffs
13	(Switzerland) EV Zug	6	2	1	0	3	20	18	+2	8	Qualification to playoffs
14	(France) Brûleurs de Loups	6	2	1	0	3	21	24	−3	8	Qualification to playoffs
15	(Switzerland) ZSC Lions	6	2	0	1	3	12	13	−1	7	Qualification to playoffs
16	(Germany) Fischtown Pinguins	6	1	2	0	3	16	17	−1	7	Qualification to playoffs
17	(Czech Republic) Mountfield HK	6	1	1	2	2	13	19	−6	7	
18	(Austria) EC KAC	6	2	0	0	4	14	20	−6	6	
19	(Italy) HC Bolzano	6	1	1	1	3	14	21	−7	6	
20	(Switzerland) Lausanne HC	6	1	1	0	4	18	24	−6	5	
21	(Denmark) Odense Bulldogs	6	1	1	0	4	15	27	−12	5	
22	(Germany) Eisbären Berlin	6	1	0	1	4	13	22	−9	4	
23	(United Kingdom) Belfast Giants	6	1	0	1	4	14	31	−17	4	
24	(Poland) GKS Tychy	6	1	0	0	5	12	19	−7	3	

Source: Champions Hockey League

=== Regular season tie-breaking criteria ===
Teams were ranked according to points (3 points for a win in regulation time, 2 points for a win in overtime, 1 point for a loss in overtime, 0 points for a loss in regulation time). If two or more teams were tied on points, the following tiebreaking criteria was applied, in the order given, to determine the rankings (see 8.4.4. Tie breaking formula group stage standings):

1. Greater number of wins in regulation time (3 point wins);
2. Greater number of wins in total (regulation time wins + overtime and shootout wins);
3. Better goal difference;
4. More goals scored;
5. Greater number of points in away games;
6. More away goals scored;
7. The higher position in the CHL Draw pot allocation.

=== Results ===
Home \ Away	BEL	SCB	BOL	GRE	BIF	BER	BRE	FRÖ	ILV	ING	KAC	KAL	KOM	LAU	LUK	LUL	MHK	ODE	RBS	PRA	STO	TYC	ZSC	EVZ
Belfast Giants					2–1				4–7			2–3 OT												
SC Bern	7–0												5–3				2–3 OT							
HC Bolzano										2–3			6–5 OT				0–4							
Brûleurs de Loups		0–2												7–4										1–5
Brynäs IF											4–2										1–2		2–0	
Eisbären Berlin				4–5 SO				1–4							2–6									
Fischtown Pinguins				5–8											3–2 SO	2–0								
Frölunda HC		4–3	3–0											5–2										
Ilves																			2–1		3–0		4–1	
ERC Ingolstadt									1–3			1–4						8–2						
EC KAC						3–2														1–4		1–4		
KalPa											3–1								3–2		6–1			
Kometa Brno					4–1				0–5									5–2						
Lausanne HC	7–3									1–3							3–2 OT							
Lukko			3–4											4–1										1–0
Luleå HF		4–2	3–2 OT																					2–3 OT
Mountfield HK					0–5							1–5						3–4 OT						
Odense Bulldogs											3–6								2–1				2–4	
Red Bull Salzburg						4–1	3–2															3–1		
Sparta Praha				4–0				4–2								2–1 SO								
Storhamar						0–3	2–1													4–2				
GKS Tychy								1–3							4–5	2–3								
ZSC Lions							2–3													1–2		4–0		
EV Zug	6–3									3–7			3–4											

Source: Champions Hockey League
Legend: Blue = home team win; Red = away team win.
Matches with lighter background shading were decided after overtime.

== Playoffs ==
=== Format ===
In the playoffs, pairings are formed based on the positions of the teams in the regular season as follows: the team finished 1st in the regular season will face the team finished 16th, the team finished 2nd will face the team finished 15th, and so on. There was no play-off draw and won't be any reseedings for the quarter-finals and semi-finals. In each round except the final, the teams will play two games and the aggregate score will decide which team advances. The first leg was hosted by the team with the lower seed with the second leg being played on the home ice of the other team. If aggregate score is tied, a sudden death overtime follows. If the overtime is scoreless, the team who wins the shoot out competition advances.

The final will be played on the home ice of the team with the higher accumulative ranking across the entire campaign, including play-off games.

=== Bracket ===
Round of 16
16	(Germany) Fischtown Pinguins	2	2	4
1	(Finland) Ilves	3	5	8
9	(Sweden) Luleå HF	6	3	9
8	(Czech Republic) Kometa Brno	1	5	6
13	(Switzerland) EV Zug	6	2	8
4	(Czech Republic) Sparta Praha	0	3	3
12	(Norway) Storhamar	2	2	4
5	(Finland) Lukko	3	5	8
6	(Germany) ERC Ingolstadt	6	3	9
11	(Austria) Red Bull Salzburg	2	4	6
14	(France) Brûleurs de Loups	1	2	3
3	(Sweden) Frölunda HC	3	1	4
10	(Sweden) Brynäs IF (OT)	1	5	6
7	(Switzerland) SC Bern	2	3	5
15	(Switzerland) ZSC Lions	4	2	6
2	(Finland) KalPa	4	4	8

Quarter-finals
1	(Finland) Ilves	2	0	2
9	(Sweden) Luleå HF	3	3	6
13	(Switzerland) EV Zug	1	3	4
5	(Finland) Lukko	3	0	3
6	(Germany) ERC Ingolstadt	1	2	3
3	(Sweden) Frölunda HC	3	2	5
10	(Sweden) Brynäs IF	5	3	8
2	(Finland) KalPa	1	2	3

Semi-finals
9	(Sweden) Luleå HF	3	3	6
13	(Switzerland) EV Zug	2	2	4
3	(Sweden) Frölunda HC	2	2	4
10	(Sweden) Brynäs IF	0	2	2

Final
9	(Sweden) Luleå HF	2
3	(Sweden) Frölunda HC (OT)	3

=== Round of 16 ===
The first legs were played on 11 and 12 November with return legs played on 18 and 19 November 2025.

Team 1	Agg.	Team 2	1st leg	2nd leg
Fischtown Pinguins (Germany)	4–8	(Finland) Ilves	2–3	2–5
ZSC Lions (Switzerland)	6–8	(Finland) KalPa	4–4	2–4
Brûleurs de Loups (France)	3–4	(Sweden) Frölunda HC	1–3	2–1
EV Zug (Switzerland)	8–3	(Czech Republic) Sparta Praha	6–0	2–3
Storhamar (Norway)	4–8	(Finland) Lukko	2–3	2–5
ERC Ingolstadt (Germany)	9–6	(Austria) Red Bull Salzburg	6–2	3–4
Brynäs IF (OT) (Sweden)	6–5	(Switzerland) SC Bern	1–2	5–3
Luleå HF (Sweden)	9–6	(Czech Republic) Kometa Brno	6–1	3–5

The first game took place at the venue of the higher-seeded team, rather than at the venue of the lower-seeded team, as the rules required.

==== (1) Ilves vs. (16) Fischtown Pinguins ====
11 November 2025; 19:30 CET	Fischtown Pinguins (Germany)	2–3 (1–1, 1–1, 0–1)	(Finland) Ilves	Eisarena Bremerhaven, Bremerhaven; Attendance: 3,048

Game reference

Leon Hungerecker
Goalies
Mantas Armalis
Referees:
Micha Hebeisen
Oskar Øvstedal
Linesmen:
Kenneth Englisch
Kai Jürgens

	0–1	7:11 – Pelli (Ratinen, Borg) (PP)
Friesen (Görtz, Byström) – 10:38	1–1
Wejse (Boos, Byström) – 31:45	2–1
	2–2	38:35 – Török (Mäntykivi, Jašek) (PP)
	2–3	41:49 – Borg (Palola, Ratinen)

31 min
Penalties
8 min
20
Shots
48

19 November 2025; 16:30 CET (17:30 EET)	Ilves (Finland)	5–2 (2–0, 1–2, 2–0)	(Germany) Fischtown Pinguins	Nokia Arena, Tampere; Attendance: 1,914

Game reference

Dominik Pavlát
Goalies
Leon Hungerecker
Referees:
Tomáš Mejzlík
Jiří Ondráček
Linesmen:
Tommi Niittylä
Joni Pekkala

Henman (Török, Jašek) (PP 5x3) – 3:13	1–0
Borg (Palola, Johansson) – 19:18	2–0
	2–1	23:04 – Verlič
	2–2	24:50 – Friesen (Kinder, Hirose)
Borg – 39:27	3–2
Lööke – 52:40	4–2
Török (Jašek, Ratinen) (EN) – 56:39	5–2

6 min
Penalties
6 min
41
Shots
49

Ilves won 8–4 on aggregate.

==== (2) KalPa vs. (15) ZSC Lions ====
11 November 2025; 19:45 CET	ZSC Lions (Switzerland)	4–4 (1–2, 2–0, 1–2)	(Finland) KalPa	Swiss Life Arena, Zurich; Attendance: 2,713

Game reference

Šimon Hrubec
Goalies
Stefanos Lekkas
Referees:
Robin Šír
Cyril Debuche
Linesmen:
Dominik Schlegel
Dominik Altmann

Riedi (Lehtonen, Åberg) (PP) – 8:35	1–0
	1–1	9:30 – Okany (Könönen, Ketola)
	1–2	11:51 – Korkiakoski (Tornberg, Kapanen)
Andreoff (Geering, Kukan) – 31:56	2–2
Malgin (Lehtonen, Frödén) – 33:41	3–2
	3–3	48:49 – Klemetti (Westerlund) (PP)
	3–4	52:19 – Okany (Ketola, Borchardt)
Andrighetto (Frödén, Malgin) – 54:41	4–4

8 min
Penalties
8 min
23
Shots
20

19 November 2025; 17:30 CET (18:30 EET)	KalPa (Finland)	4–2 (1–0, 3–0, 0–2)	(Switzerland) ZSC Lions	Olvi Areena, Kuopio; Attendance: 3,305

Game reference

Stefanos Lekkas
Goalies
Šimon Hrubec
Referees:
Tobias Björk
Andreas Harnebring
Linesmen:
Onni Hautamäki
Jussi Thomann

	0–1	4:08 – Kukan (Lehtonen, Frödén)
Borchardt (Curry) – 16:12	1–1
Hartikainen (Rissanen, Mäenpää) – 23:16	2–1
Mononen (Könönen) – 26:08	3–1
Hartikainen (Ketola, Rissanen) (PP) – 32:08	4–1
	4–2	43:20 – Åberg (Schwendeler, Frödén)

6 min
Penalties
8 min
35
Shots
70

KalPa won 8–6 on aggregate.

==== (3) Frölunda HC vs. (14) Brûleurs de Loups ====
11 November 2025; 20:15 CET	Brûleurs de Loups (France)	1–3 (0–1, 1–0, 0–2)	(Sweden) Frölunda HC	Patinoire Polesud, Grenoble; Attendance: 4,208

Game reference

Matija Pintarič
Goalies
Tobias Normann
Referees:
Roland Gerber
Cedric Borga
Linesmen:
Quentin Ugolini
Joffrey Yssembourg

	0–1	8:59 – Peterson (Innala, Hasa)
Dair (Bachelet, Leclerc) – 38:22	1–1
	1–2	44:06 – Heens (Weissbach, Friberg)
	1–3	57:43 – Weissbach

6 min
Penalties
4 min
17
Shots
33

18 November 2025; 19:00 CET	Frölunda HC (Sweden)	1–2 (0–0, 1–1, 0–1)	(France) Brûleurs de Loups	Scandinavium, Gothenburg; Attendance: 4,288

Game reference

Tobias Normann
Goalies
Matija Pintarič
Referees:
Riku Brander
Toni Hyvärinen
Linesmen:
Anders Nyqvist
Ludvig Lundgren

Ruotsalainen (Högberg, Niederbach) – 34:45	1–0
	1–1	36:02 – Binner (Treille, Deschamps)
	1–2	46:05 – Mallet (Englund, Bachelet) (PP)

4 min
Penalties
8 min
48
Shots
28

Frölunda HC won 4–3 on aggregate.

==== (4) HC Sparta Praha vs. (13) EV Zug ====
12 November 2025; 19:45 CET	EV Zug (Switzerland)	6–0 (4–0, 1–0, 1–0)	(Czech Republic) HC Sparta Praha	OYM Hall, Zug; Attendance: 4,984

Game reference

Leonardo Genoni
Goalies
Josef Kořenář
Referees:
Lukas Kohlmüller
Rasmus Haarkær Ankersen
Linesmen:
Eric Cattaneo
Aurélien Urfer

Hofmann (Künzle, Stadler) – 4:48	1–0
Kubalík (Hofmann, Sklenička) (PP) – 8:10	2–0
Künzle (Jan Kovář, Schlumpf) – 10:40	3–0
Lindemann (Leuenberger, Eggenberger) – 11:44	4–0
Sklenička (Wingerli) – 24:37	5–0
Herzog (Graham, Wingerli) – 43:58	6–0

2 min
Penalties
6 min
40
Shots
30

18 November 2025; 18:00 CET	HC Sparta Praha (Czech Republic)	3–2 (0–0, 2–0, 1–2)	(Switzerland) EV Zug	Hala Fortuna, Prague; Attendance: 3,288

Game reference

Jakub Kovář
Goalies
Leonardo Genoni
Referees:
Mikael Holm
Linus Öhlund
Linesmen:
Stanislav Hnát
Jiří Svoboda

Němeček (Horák, Chlapík) – 30:30	1–0
Hrabík (SH) – 35:39	2–0
	2–1	49:02 – Kubalík (PP)
Pysyk (Krejčík, Dzierkals) – 52:48	3–1
	3–2	53:46 – Petrovič

4 min
Penalties
6 min
73
Shots
37

EV Zug won 8–3 on aggregate.

==== (5) Lukko vs. (12) Storhamar ====
12 November 2025; 18:30 CET	Storhamar (Norway)	2–3 (1–0, 1–0, 0–3)	(Finland) Lukko	CC Amfi, Hamar; Attendance: 3,639

Game reference

Markus Røhnebæk Stensrud
Goalies
Antti Raanta
Referees:
David Cespiva
Manuel Nikolic
Linesmen:
Niklas Aldar Wilhelmsen
Njaal Søstumoen

Berglund (Dilling Hurrød) – 16:38	1–0
Cangelosi (Berglund) – 34:00	2–0
	2–1	40:34 – Beaucage (Ruohomaa, Stenqvist) (PP)
	2–2	43:45 – Jandric (Peters, Beaucage)
	2–3	57:42 – Gélinas (Beaucage) (PP)

10 min
Penalties
6 min
29
Shots
80

18 November 2025; 17:30 CET (18:30 EET)	Lukko (Finland)	5–2 (1–1, 1–1, 3–0)	(Norway) Storhamar	Kivikylän Areena, Rauma; Attendance: 2,328

Game reference

Antti Raanta
Goalies
Henrik Fayen-Vestavik
Referees:
Marian Rohatsch
André Schrader
Linesmen:
Niko Jusi
Luka Mäkinen

	0–1	5:49 – Bakke Olsen (Skedung, Aas-Larsen)
Intonen (Pat. Westerholm, Saarela) (PP) – 9:01	1–1
Pon. Westerholm (Almari, Stenqvist) – 25:20	2–1
	2–2	32:06 – Berglund (Martinsen, Cangelosi)
Jandric (Viitasalo, Gélinas) (PP) – 41:33	3–2
Pat. Westerholm (Saarela) – 42:34	4–2
Ruohomaa (Stenqvist, Beaucage) (PP) – 57:16	5–2

2 min
Penalties
10 min
48
Shots
31

Lukko won 8–4 on aggregate.

==== (6) ERC Ingolstadt vs. (11) Red Bull Salzburg ====
12 November 2025; 19:30 CET	ERC Ingolstadt (Germany)	6–2 (3–1, 1–0, 2–1)	(Austria) Red Bull Salzburg	Saturn Arena, Ingolstadt; Attendance: 2,751

Game reference

Nico Pertuch
Goalies
Atte Tolvanen
Referees:
Jan Hribik
Emīls Druseiks
Linesmen:
Joshua Römer
Yannik Koziol

Barber (Abbandonato, Breton) – 5:38	1–0
	1–1	13:31 – Lewington (Nissner)
Krauß (Spornberger, Girduckis) – 14:31	2–1
Powell (Sheen, Barber) – 15:07	3–1
Barber (Schmölz, Jandric) (PP) – 34:51	4–1
	4–2	42:34 – Hörl (Raffl)
Krauß (Keating) – 43:28	5–2
Barber (Breton, Sheen) (PP 5x3) – 53:21	6–2

4 min
Penalties
14 min
67
Shots
55

19 November 2025; 19:15 CET	Red Bull Salzburg (Austria)	4–3 (2–1, 1–0, 1–2)	(Germany) ERC Ingolstadt	Eisarena Salzburg, Salzburg; Attendance: 2,931

Game reference

David Kickert
Goalies
Nico Pertuch
Referees:
Mikko Kaukokari
Michael Tscherrig
Linesmen:
Oto Durmis
Simon Riecken

Coe (Nienhuis) – 5:27	1–0
	1–1	15:04 – Keating
Nienhuis (Nissner) – 15:17	2–1
St. Denis (Coe) – 37:17	3–1
	3–2	49:11 – Krauß (Sheen)
Huber (PP, EA) – 53:38	4–2
	4–3	55:48 – Schmölz (EN)

2 min
Penalties
4 min
62
Shots
31

ERC Ingolstadt won 9–6 on aggregate.

==== (7) SC Bern vs. (10) Brynäs IF ====
11 November 2025; 19:00 CET	Brynäs IF (Sweden)	1–2 (0–0, 0–1, 1–1)	(Switzerland) SC Bern	Monitor ERP Arena, Gävle; Attendance: 2,011

Game reference

Collin Delia
Goalies
Adam Reideborn
Referees:
Andreas Huber
Joseph Sewell
Linesmen:
Gustav Jonsson
Rasmus Strömberg

	0–1	26:22 – Baumgartner (Lehmann, Vermin)
Larsson (Rödin, Bäckström) (PP) – 45:23	1–1
	1–2	54:07 – Lehmann (Baumgartner)

2 min
Penalties
4 min
27
Shots
26

18 November 2025; 19:45 CET	SC Bern (Switzerland)	3–5 (OT) (0–1, 3–1, 0–2) (OT 0–1)	(Sweden) Brynäs IF	PostFinance Arena, Bern; Attendance: 4,602

Game reference

Adam Reideborn
Goalies
Collin Delia
Referees:
Lassi Heikkinen
Kristian Vikman
Linesmen:
Michael Stalder
Sébastien Duc

	0–1	19:24 – Kopacka (Pettersson, Norlinder) (PP)
Aaltonen (Häman Aktell, Lehmann) (PP) – 26:43	1–1
Häman Aktell (Lehmann, Vermin) – 27:24	2–1
Vermin (Aaltonen, Lehmann) – 29:46	3–1
	3–2	32:34 – Silfverberg (Ölund, Bäckström)
	3–3	52:27 – Kopacka (Hägg, Kempný)
	3–4	59:04 – Lindblom (Larsson, Kopacka) (EA)
	3–5	62:41 – Larsson

8 min
Penalties
8 min
52
Shots
72

Brynäs IF won 6–5 on aggregate.

==== (8) Kometa Brno vs. (9) Luleå HF ====
11 November 2025; 19:00 CET	Luleå HF (Sweden)	6–1 (0–1, 1–0, 5–0)	(Czech Republic) Kometa Brno	Coop Norrbotten Arena, Luleå; Attendance: 2,672

Game reference

Matteus Ward
Goalies
Gašper Krošelj pulled out at 40:00
Jan Ondráček
Referees:
Joonas Kova
Gergely Gebei
Linesmen:
Teodor Sörholm
Niclas Westman

	0–1	1:44 – David Moravec (Süss, Davidson)
Levtchi (Eriksson, Gustafsson) – 21:09	1–1
Håkansson (Granberg, Koivistoinen) – 45:03	2–1
O'Neill (Sellgren, Hedqvist) – 48:52	3–1
Nurmi (Levtchi) – 50:04	4–1
Shinnimin (O'Neill, Hedqvist) – 55:35	5–1
Själin (Håkansson) – 59:56	6–1

0 min
Penalties
2 min
44
Shots
14

18 November 2025; 18:00 CET	Kometa Brno (Czech Republic)	5–3 (1–0, 1–1, 3–2)	(Sweden) Luleå HF	Winning Group Arena, Brno; Attendance: 2,142

Game reference

Jan Kavan
Goalies
Matteus Ward
Referees:
Christian Ofner
Christoph Sternat
Linesmen:
Jiří Ondráček
David Thuma

Zbořil – 11:37	1–0
	1–1	27:18 – Hedqvist (O'Neill, Shinnimin)
Furch (Ferda, Zohorna) – 33:53	2–1
Ďaloga (Stránský) – 40:50	3–1
	3–2	45:56 – Liedes (Koivistoinen, Juustovaara Karlsson)
Kos (Ekrt, Jurný) – 46:06	4–2
	4–3
Stránský (Bartejs, Kollár) (EN) – 59:41	5–3

2 min
Penalties
2 min
29
Shots
69

Luleå HF won 9–6 on aggregate.

=== Quarter-finals ===
The first legs were on 2 and 3 December with return legs played on 16 December 2025.

Team 1	Agg.	Team 2	1st leg	2nd leg
Luleå HF (Sweden)	6–2	(Finland) Ilves	3–2	3–0
Brynäs IF (Sweden)	8–3	(Finland) KalPa	5–1	3–2
ERC Ingolstadt (Germany)	3–5	(Sweden) Frölunda HC	1–3	2–2
Lukko (Finland)	3–4	(Switzerland) EV Zug	3–1	0–3

==== (1) Ilves vs. (9) Luleå HF ====
2 December 2025; 18:00 CET	Luleå HF (Sweden)	3–2 (2–0, 0–0, 1–2)	(Finland) Ilves	Coop Norrbotten Arena, Luleå; Attendance: 1,814

Game reference

Matteus Ward
Goalies
Mantas Armalis
Referees:
Micha Hebeisen
Christian Ofner
Linesmen:
Ludvig Lundgren
Teodor Sörholm

Shinnimin (O'Neill, Själin) – 4:42	1–0
Nurmi (Bromé, Andreasson) (PP) – 14:44	2–0
	2–1	42:27 – Laurell (Engberg, Johansson)
Bromé (Hedqvist, Eriksson) – 44:40	3–1
	3–2	50:19 – Teuho-Markkola (Mäntykivi, Ratinen)

4 min
Penalties
6 min
64
Shots
34

16 December 2025; 17:30 CET (18:30 EET)	Ilves (Finland)	0–3 (0–0, 0–0, 0–3)	(Sweden) Luleå HF	Nokia Arena, Tampere; Attendance: 2,720

Game reference

Dominik Pavlát
Goalies
Matteus Ward
Referees:
Christoph Sternat
Lukas Kohlmüller
Linesmen:
Luka Mäkinen
Joni Pekkala

0–1	48:51 – O'Neill (Allard, Gustafsson) (PP)
0–2	52:21 – Andreasson (Allard, Shinnimin)
0–3	56:18 – Laaksonen (Bromé, Koivistoinen) (EN)

8 min
Penalties
14 min
48
Shots
36

Luleå HF won 6–2 on aggregate.

==== (2) KalPa vs. (10) Brynäs IF ====
2 December 2025; 19:00 CET	Brynäs IF (Sweden)	5–1 (1–1, 3–0, 1–0)	(Finland) KalPa	Monitor ERP Arena, Gävle; Attendance: 4,089

Game reference

Collin Delia
Goalies
Stefanos Lekkas
Referees:
Marian Rohatsch
André Schrader
Linesmen:
Rasmus Strömberg
William Henriksson

	0–1	0:25 – Okany (Hartikainen)
Jonsson-Fjällby – 4:57	1–1
Hillström (Hägg, Pettersson) – 29:10	2–1
Kopacka (Norlinder, Bellows) – 31:59	3–1
Kinnvall – 39:56	4–1
Andersson (Silfverberg, Jonsson-Fjällby) – 48:47	5–1

6 min
Penalties
6 min
39
Shots
16

16 December 2025; 17:30 CET (18:30 EET)	KalPa (Finland)	2–3 (1–0, 0–2, 1–1)	(Sweden) Brynäs IF	Olvi Areena, Kuopio; Attendance: 2,274

Game reference

Talyn Boyko
Goalies
Erik Källgren
Referees:
Michael Tscherrig
Jan Hribik
Linesmen:
Oskari Saarimäki
Jussi Thomann

Rissanen (Mäenpää, Lappalainen) (PP) – 8:32	1–0
	1–1	35:15 – Larsson (Bäckström, Kinnvall) (PP)
	1–2	39:40 – Norlinder (Jonsson-Fjällby, Hillström)
Kapanen (Westerlund, Okany) (PP) – 50:06	2–2
	2–3	55:58 – Norlinder (Kopacka, Bellows)

4 min
Penalties
14 min
59
Shots
29

Brynäs IF won 8–3 on aggregate.

==== (3) Frölunda HC vs. (6) ERC Ingolstadt ====
2 December 2025; 19:30 CET	ERC Ingolstadt (Germany)	1–3 (1–0, 0–2, 0–1)	(Sweden) Frölunda HC	Saturn Arena, Ingolstadt; Attendance: 2,780

Game reference

Nico Pertuch
Goalies
Tobias Normann
Referees:
Andreas Huber
Jiří Ondráček
Linesmen:
Kenneth Englisch
Jonas Reinold

Hüttl (Girduckis, Agostino) – 11:15	1–0
	1–1	20:22 – Innala (Weissbach, Tömmernes) (PP)
	1–2	32:33 – Tömmernes (Egli, Friberg)
	1–3	51:59 – Högberg (Friberg, Weissbach)

2 min
Penalties
2 min
28
Shots
57

16 December 2025; 18:00 CET	Frölunda HC (Sweden)	2–2 (0–0, 1–2, 1–0)	(Germany) ERC Ingolstadt	Scandinavium, Gothenburg; Attendance: 4,011

Game reference

Lars Johansson
Goalies
Nico Pertuch
Referees:
Toni Hyvärinen
Kristian Vikman
Linesmen:
Anders Nyqvist
Gustav Jonsson

Cederqvist (Kongsbak Klyvø) – 26:44	1–0
	1–1	31:56 – Hüttl (Jandric, Pietta) (PP)
	1–2	35:02 – Girduckis (Breton, Jandric)
Lindholm (EN) – 59:44	2–2

8 min
Penalties
0 min
42
Shots
42

Frölunda HC won 5–3 on aggregate.

==== (5) Lukko vs. (13) EV Zug ====
3 December 2025; 17:30 CET (18:30 EET)	Lukko (Finland)	3–1 (1–0, 1–0, 1–1)	(Switzerland) EV Zug	Kivikylän Areena, Rauma; Attendance: 2,002

Game reference

Antti Raanta
Goalies
Leonardo Genoni
Referees:
Tobias Björk
Linus Öhlund
Linesmen:
Teo Mäkinen
Tommi Niittylä

Olsson (Intonen, Viitasalo) – 19:00	1–0
Intonen (Pon. Westerholm) – 26:19	2–0
	2–1	40:39 – Künzle (Kubalík, Jan Kovář) (PP)
Pon. Westerholm (Pat. Westerholm, Saarela) – 42:53	3–1

4 min
Penalties
4 min
44
Shots
52

16 December 2025; 19:45 CET	EV Zug (Switzerland)	3–0 (0–0, 3–0, 0–0)	(Finland) Lukko	OYM Hall, Zug; Attendance: 4,175

Game reference

Leonardo Genoni
Goalies
Antti Raanta
Referees:
Mikael Holm
Christoffer Holm
Linesmen:
Dominik Schlegel
Eric Cattaneo

Hofmann (Künzle, Schlumpf) – 21:25	1–0
Tatar (Jan Kovář, Kubalík) – 31:31	2–0
Hofmann (Senteler, Guerra) (PP) – 39:54	3–0

44 min
Penalties
52 min
2
Shots
2

EV Zug won 4–3 on aggregate.

=== Semi-finals ===
The first legs were played on 13 January with return legs played on 20 January 2026.

Team 1	Agg.	Team 2	1st leg	2nd leg
EV Zug (Switzerland)	4–6	(Sweden) Luleå HF	2–3	2–3
Brynäs IF (Sweden)	2–4	(Sweden) Frölunda HC	0–2	2–2

==== (9) Luleå HF vs. (13) EV Zug ====
13 January 2026; 19:45 CET	EV Zug (Switzerland)	2–3 (0–1, 1–2, 1–0)	(Sweden) Luleå HF	OYM Hall, Zug; Attendance: 4,078

Game reference

Leonardo Genoni
Goalies
Joel Lassinantti
Referees:
Kristian Vikman
Jiří Ondráček
Linesmen:
Dominik Schlegel
Michael Stalder

	0–1	18:26 – Liedes (Tardif, Eriksson)
Jan Kovář (Riva, Hofmann) (PP) – 30:09	1–1
	1–2	32:12 – Hedqvist (SH)
	1–3	35:23 – Tardif (Laaksonen, Liedes)
Tatar (Kubalík, Sklenička) (PP) – 47:08	2–3

8 min
Penalties
8 min
25
Shots
61

20 January 2026; 19:00 CET	Luleå HF (Sweden)	3–2 (2–0, 1–2, 0–0)	(Switzerland) EV Zug	Coop Norrbotten Arena, Luleå; Attendance: 4,150

Game reference

Joel Lassinantti
Goalies
Leonardo Genoni
Referees:
Marian Rohatsch
Joonas Kova
Linesmen:
Rasmus Strömberg
Teodor Sörholm

Hedqvist (Shinnimin, O'Neill) – 6:41	1–0
Andreasson (Laaksonen, Levtchi) (PP) – 14:50	2–0
Shinnimin (Engsund, Hedqvist) – 25:35	3–0
	3–1	26:12 – Hofmann (Tatar)
	3–2	32:32 – Tatar (Kubalík)

8 min
Penalties
6 min
54
Shots
56

Luleå HF won 6–4 on aggregate.

==== (3) Frölunda HC vs. (10) Brynäs IF ====
13 January 2026; 19:00 CET	Brynäs IF (Sweden)	0–2 (0–1, 0–0, 0–1)	(Sweden) Frölunda HC	Monitor ERP Arena, Gävle; Attendance: 4,887

Game reference
Erik Källgren	Goalies	Lars Johansson	Referees: Linus Öhlund; Andreas Huber; Linesmen: Rasmus Strömberg; William Henriksson
0–1 / 10:32 – Stenberg (Högberg, Lindholm) (PP); 0–2 / 49:32 – Friberg (Innala, Tömmernes) (PP)			Referees: Linus Öhlund; Andreas Huber; Linesmen: Rasmus Strömberg; William Henriksson
6 min	Penalties	12 min	Referees: Linus Öhlund; Andreas Huber; Linesmen: Rasmus Strömberg; William Henriksson
46	Shots	47	Referees: Linus Öhlund; Andreas Huber; Linesmen: Rasmus Strömberg; William Henriksson

20 January 2026; 19:00 CET	Frölunda HC (Sweden)	2–2 (1–2, 1–0, 0–0)	(Sweden) Brynäs IF	Frölundaborg, Gothenburg; Attendance: 4,063

Game reference

Lars Johansson
Goalies
Damian Clara
Erik Källgren
Referees:
Michael Tscherrig
Mikael Holm
Linesmen:
Anders Nyqvist
Ludvig Lundgren

	0–1	3:32 – Kinnvall (Bellows, Lindblom) (PP)
Heens (Niederbach, Lindholm) – 11:50	1–1
	1–2	19:17 – Larsson (Bellows, Bertilsson)
Heens (Weissbach, Friberg) – 31:18	2–2

6 min
Penalties
4 min
47
Shots
50

Frölunda HC won 4–2 on aggregate.

=== Final ===
3 March 2026; 19:00 CET	Frölunda HC (Sweden)	3–2 (OT) (0–0, 1–0, 1–2) (OT 1–0)	(Sweden) Luleå HF	Scandinavium, Gothenburg; Attendance: 12,044

Game reference

Tobias Normann
Goalies
Matteus Ward
Referees:
Mikael Holm
Christoph Sternat
Linesmen:
Ludvig Lundgren
Tommi Niittylä

Lasu (SH) – 31:32	1–0
	1–1	41:44 – Koivistoinen (Bromé, Omark)
Peterson (Tömmernes, Innala) (PP) – 47:24	2–1
	2–2	59:44 – Leskinen (Tardif, O'Neill) (EA)
Innala (Tömmernes, Ruotsalainen) (PP) – 64:57	3–2

6 min
Penalties
6 min
62
Shots
47

== Statistics ==
=== Scoring leaders ===
The following players lead the league in points.

Player	Team	GP	G	A	PTS	PIM	+/–	GWG	PPG	SHG	SOG	S%
(Switzerland) Grégory Hofmann	(Switzerland) EV Zug	11	6	7	13	6	0	3	1	0	36	16.67%
(United States) Riley Barber	(Germany) ERC Ingolstadt	9	6	6	12	2	+1	1	2	0	37	16.22%
(Czech Republic) Dominik Kubalík	(Switzerland) EV Zug	12	5	7	12	0	+1	0	3	0	47	10.64%
(Sweden) Max Friberg	(Sweden) Frölunda HC	13	3	9	12	2	+10	0	2	0	21	14.29%
(Finland) Jere Innala	(Sweden) Frölunda HC	13	2	10	12	6	0	1	2	0	37	5.41%
(Sweden) Mathias Bromé	(Sweden) Luleå HF	12	2	9	11	8	+2	2	0	0	19	10.53%
(Slovakia) Tomáš Tatar	(Switzerland) EV Zug	8	6	4	10	14	+4	0	2	0	14	42.86%
(Canada) Eric Gélinas	(Finland) Lukko	10	4	6	10	4	+3	1	1	0	24	16.67%
(Sweden) Henrik Tömmernes	(Sweden) Frölunda HC	12	4	6	10	8	+2	2	1	0	19	21.05%
(United States) Cade Borchardt	(Finland) KalPa	9	3	7	10	2	+1	0	0	0	14	21.43%

=== Leading goaltenders ===
The following goaltenders lead the league in save percentage, provided that they have played at least 40% of their team's minutes.

Player	Team	GP	W	L	SV	GA	SV%	GAA	SO	MIN
(Czech Republic) Jakub Kovář	(Czech Republic) Sparta Praha	4	4	0	64	4	94.12%	0.98	1	245
(Norway) Markus Røhnebæk Stensrud	(Norway) Storhamar	5	3	2	140	10	93.33%	2.00	0	300
(Sweden) Lars Johansson	(Sweden) Frölunda HC	6	3	1	123	10	92.48%	1.68	1	357
(Norway) Tobias Normann	(Sweden) Frölunda HC	7	6	1	117	10	92.13%	1.43	1	420
(Finland) Antti Raanta	(Finland) Lukko	7	6	1	128	11	92.09%	1.58	1	418

== Awards ==
=== Team of the Regular Season ===
The Team of the Regular Season was announced on 31 October 2025.

Position	Player	Team
Goaltender	(Norway) Markus Røhnebæk Stensrud	(Norway) Storhamar
Defenceman	(Canada) Eric Gélinas	(Finland) Lukko
Defenceman	(United States) Mason Klee	(Denmark) Odense Bulldogs
Forward	(Latvia) Mārtiņš Dzierkals	(Czech Republic) Sparta Praha
Forward	(Canada) François Beauchemin	(France) Brûleurs de Loups
Forward	(Slovenia) Jan Urbas	(Germany) Fischtown Pinguins

=== MVP ===
LGT MVP Award nominees were announced on 15 and 16 January 2026.

Player	Team
(Sweden) Max Friberg	(Sweden) Frölunda HC
(United States) Jack Kopacka	(Sweden) Brynäs IF
(United States) Riley Barber	(Germany) ERC Ingolstadt
(Czech Republic) Dominik Kubalík	(Switzerland) EV Zug
(Sweden) Henrik Tömmernes	(Sweden) Frölunda HC

=== Home Game and Overall ===
As of 3 March 2026

Pos.	Team	Regular season		Playoffs		Overall			2024–25 average
Pos.	Team	Matches	Attendance	Matches	Attendance	Matches	Total	Average	2024–25 average
1	(Switzerland) SC Bern	3	20,260	1	4,602	4	24,862	6,216	—
2	(Northern Ireland) Belfast Giants	3	14,333	0	—	3	14,333	4,778	—
3	(Sweden) Frölunda HC	3	8,767	4	24,406	7	33,173	4,739	—
4	(Germany) Eisbären Berlin	3	13,991	0	—	3	13,991	4,664	4,230
5	(Switzerland) Lausanne HC	3	13,975	0	—	3	13,975	4,658	4,695
6	(Switzerland) ZSC Lions	3	14,904	1	2,713	4	17,617	4,404	5,465
7	(Switzerland) EV Zug	3	11,763	3	13,237	6	25,000	4,167	—
8	(France) Brûleurs de Loups	3	12,329	1	4,208	4	16,537	4,134	—
9	(Sweden) Brynäs IF	3	13,136	3	10,987	6	24,123	4,021	—
10	(Norway) Storhamar Hockey	3	11,548	1	3,639	4	15,187	3,797	3,201
11	(Czech Republic) HC Kometa Brno	3	12,334	1	2,142	4	14,476	3,619	—
12	(Germany) Pinguins Bremerhaven	3	11,364	1	3,048	4	14,412	3,603	4,240
13	(Czech Republic) HC Sparta Praha	3	10,756	1	3,288	4	14,044	3,511	6,646
14	(Sweden) Luleå HF	3	10,141	3	8,636	6	18,777	3,130	—
15	(Austria) EC KAC	3	8,690	0	—	3	8,690	2,897	2,710
16	(Czech Republic) Mountfield HK	3	8,657	0	—	3	8,657	2,886	—
17	(Italy) HC Bolzano	3	8,612	0	—	3	8,612	2,871	—
18	(Austria) Red Bull Salzburg	3	8,277	1	2,931	4	11,208	2,802	2,160
19	(Finland) KalPa	3	7,923	2	5,579	5	13,502	2,700	—
20	(Germany) ERC Ingolstadt	3	7,765	2	5,531	5	13,296	2,659	—
21	(Finland) Lukko	3	8,770	2	4,330	5	13,100	2,620	—
22	(Finland) Ilves	3	6,591	2	4,634	5	11,225	2,245	4,824
23	(Poland) GKS Tychy	3	6,144	0	—	3	6,144	2,048	—
24	(Denmark) Odense Bulldogs	3	4,359	0	—	3	4,359	1,453	—
Tournament total		72	255,389	29	103,911	101	359,300	3,557	4,070

Source: Champions Hockey League. The dash indicates that the team did not participate in the 2024–25 competition.
