= Oskari Laaksonen =

Finnish ice hockey player (born 1999)

- Born: 2 July 1999 (age 27) Tampere, Finland
- Height: 6 ft 2 in (188 cm)
- Weight: 165 lb (75 kg; 11 st 11 lb)
- Position: Defence
- Shoots: Right
- NL team Former teams: EHC Biel; Ilves; Lahti Pelicans; Luleå HF
- NHL draft: 89th overall, 2017; Buffalo Sabres
- Playing career: 2017–present

Oskari Laaksonen (born 2 July 1999) is a Finnish professional ice hockey defenseman who is currently playing with EHC Biel of the National League (NL). He was selected by the Buffalo Sabres in the third round, 89th overall, of the 2017 NHL entry draft.

== Playing career ==
Laaksonen, as a youth, played with Ilves' U16, U18, and U20 teams. After playing for Ilves U20, Laaksonen was drafted 89th overall by the Sabres in the 2017 NHL entry draft.

Laaksonen made his Liiga debut during the 2017–18 season, on 9 January 2018, in a 6–5 defeat to HPK. He played out the season to contribute with 4 assists in 21 games.

On 15 June 2020, Laaksonen was signed by the Sabres to a three-year, entry-level contract. It was announced he would initially continue his tenure with Ilves for the 2020–21 season, however on 21 September 2020, Laaksonen was loaned by the Sabres to fellow Liiga club, Lahti Pelicans.

Entering the 2022–23 season assigned to begin his third year with the Sabres AHL affiliate, the Rochester Americans, Laaksonen was limited to just 10 appearances through the opening months. On 15 December 2022, Laaksonen was traded by the Sabres to the Dallas Stars in exchange for Joseph Cecconi. He was immediately reassigned to join their AHL club, the Texas Stars. Remaining with Texas until the conclusion of the season, Laaksonen recorded 8 points through 29 regular season games before adding 3 points in 6 playoff contests.

As an impending restricted free agent from the Stars, Laaksonen opted to return to Europe in signing a two-year contract with Swedish club Luleå HF of the Swedish Hockey League (SHL) on 26 May 2023. His NHL rights were later relinquished by the Stars on 1 July 2023.

After helping Luleå HF claim their first Championship in 29 years, Laaksonen left at the conclusion of his two-year tenure and was signed to a two-year contract with Swiss club, EHC Biel of the NL, on 8 May 2025.

== International play ==
Medal record

Representing Finland

Ice hockey

World Junior Championships
Gold medal – first place	2019 Canada	

Laaksonen appeared for Finland in 6 junior international friendly games in 2016, before he was later selected to represent his country at the 2019 World Junior Championships in Vancouver, British Columbia, Canada. He collected 1 goal in 7 games from the blueline, helping Finland claim the gold medal for their 5th title.

== Career statistics ==
=== Regular season and playoffs ===
			Regular season					Playoffs
Season	Team	League	GP	G	A	Pts	PIM	GP	G	A	Pts	PIM
2016–17	Ilves	Jr. A	27	6	3	9	14	6	1	1	2	4
2017–18	Ilves	Jr. A	40	4	11	15	52	—	—	—	—	—
2017–18	Ilves	Liiga	21	0	4	4	8	—	—	—	—	—
2018–19	Ilves	Liiga	46	3	21	24	36	4	0	1	1	0
2019–20	Ilves	Liiga	46	2	10	12	14	—	—	—	—	—
2020–21	Lahti Pelicans	Liiga	20	4	8	12	14	—	—	—	—	—
2020–21	Rochester Americans	AHL	28	2	15	17	6	—	—	—	—	—
2021–22	Rochester Americans	AHL	71	5	29	34	44	2	0	1	1	0
2022–23	Rochester Americans	AHL	10	0	2	2	8	—	—	—	—	—
2022–23	Texas Stars	AHL	29	2	6	8	12	6	1	2	3	0
2023–24	Luleå HF	SHL	52	3	26	29	32	5	2	1	3	4
2024–25	Luleå HF	SHL	24	5	13	18	42	7	0	5	5	6
Liiga totals			133	9	43	52	72	4	0	1	1	0
SHL totals			76	8	39	47	74	12	2	6	8	10

=== International ===
Year	Team	Event	Result	GP	G	A	Pts	PIM
2019	Finland	WJC	1st place, gold medalist(s)	7	1	0	1	6
Junior totals				7	1	0	1	6

== Awards and honours ==
Award	Year
AHL
North All-Star Team	2021
SHL
Le Mat Trophy (Luleå HF)	2025
