= Könönen =

Könönen is a Finnish surname. Notable people with the surname include:

- Juuso Könönen (born 1998), Finnish ice hockey player
- Kaarlo Könönen (1892–1965), Finnish architect
- Salomon Könönen (1916–1979), Finnish long-distance runner
- Tuomo Könönen (born 1977), Finnish football player
- Valentin Kononen (born 1969), Finnish race walker
