= Thomas Berglund (ice hockey) =

Swedish ice hockey player and coach

- Born: February 9, 1969 (age 56); Piteå, Sweden
- Height: 5 ft 8 in (173 cm)
- Weight: 174 lb (79 kg; 12 st 6 lb)
- Position: Forward
- Shot: Left
- Played for: Luleå HF (Elitserien); Piteå HC (Division I)
- NHL draft: Undrafted
- Playing career: 1986–2005

Thomas Berglund (born February 9, 1969) is a Swedish former professional ice hockey player. He is currently the head coach of the Luleå HF of the Swedish Hockey League (SHL). Berglund played 17 seasons (669 games) with Luleå HF of the Swedish Swedish Elite League.

On January 19, 2015 it was announced that Berglund would become the head coach of Brynäs IF in the Swedish Hockey League.
