= Linus Omark =

Swedish ice hockey player (born 1987)

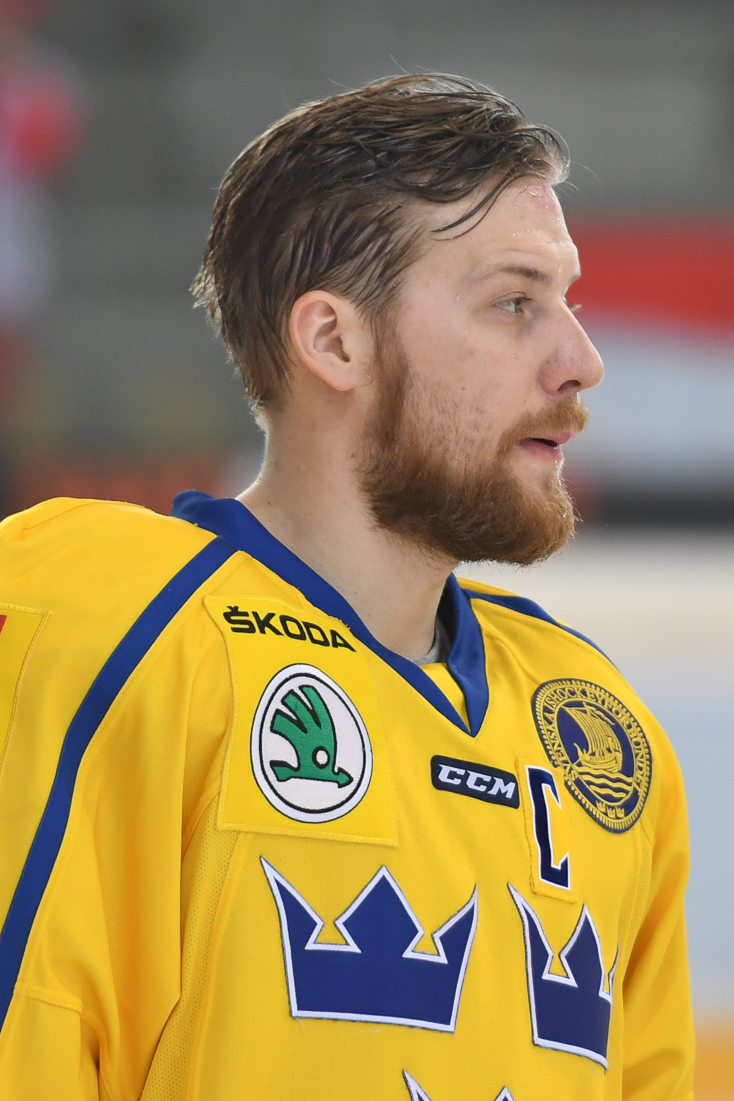
- Omark in 2017
- Born: 5 February 1987 (age 39) Övertorneå, Sweden
- Height: 180 cm (5 ft 11 in)
- Weight: 82 kg (181 lb; 12 st 13 lb)
- Position: Left wing
- Shot: Left
- Played for: Luleå HF; Dynamo Moscow; Edmonton Oilers; EV Zug; Buffalo Sabres; Jokerit; Salavat Yulaev Ufa; Genève-Servette HC; HC Lugano
- National team: Sweden
- NHL draft: 97th overall, 2007; Edmonton Oilers
- Playing career: 2005–2026

Linus Karl Heimer Omark (born 5 February 1987) is a Swedish former professional ice hockey left winger who last played for Luleå HF of the SHL. Omark previously played in the National Hockey League (NHL) for the Buffalo Sabres and Edmonton Oilers. He was drafted into the NHL by the Edmonton Oilers in the fourth round, 97th overall, of the 2007 NHL entry draft.

== Playing career ==
Omark began his professional hockey career in his native Sweden playing for Luleå Hockey of the Elitserien. In the 2008–09 season, Omark led Luleå in scoring with 23 goals and 55 points, good for third in the league. Following that successful campaign, Omark played one season with Dynamo Moscow of the Kontinental Hockey League (KHL), scoring 20 goals and 36 points in 56 games. Omark became known as a "YouTube sensation" for his creative scoring attempts, which included a shootout goal where he flipped the puck over a sprawling Switzerland goaltender Marco Bührer in a March 2009 international exhibition, a between-the-legs goal in a game against Timrå IK and a behind-the-net, lacrosse-style attempt against Brynäs IF.

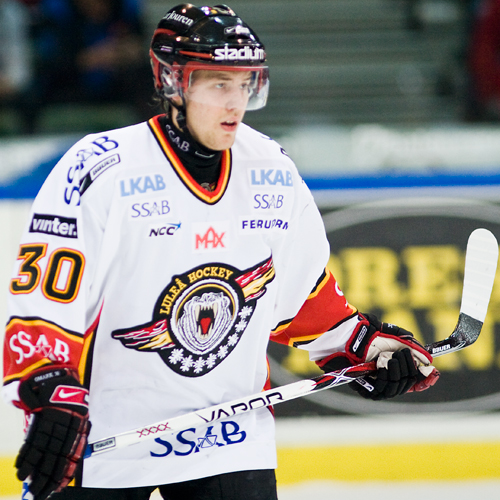
Omark in 2008.

Omark moved to North America for the 2010–11 season and, following his first training camp with the Oilers, during which he recorded three points in two exhibition matches, was assigned to the Oklahoma City Barons, the Oilers' American Hockey League (AHL) affiliate. Omark drew attention when he blamed the demotion on "politics". However, he had a successful start to the season, recording 13 goals and 26 points through his first 26 games with the Barons to lead the team in scoring. Five of those goals came in one game on 7 November 2010, when Omark scored five times against the Toronto Marlies and added another goal in a shootout to help the Barons to a 7–6 victory. Omark admitted that although he was initially angry with the demotion, he took it as a learning experience and an opportunity to prove himself, channeling his emotions to work at improving his game.

After injuries to Oilers forwards Aleš Hemský and Shawn Horcoff, Omark and fellow Barons teammate Ryan O'Marra were recalled on 8 December 2010. Omark made his NHL debut on 10 December against the Tampa Bay Lightning, a 4–3 shootout win for the Oilers in which he recorded an assist and scored the clinching shootout goal. His shootout goal drew widespread attention, as it featured a spin move at centre ice; Lightning forward Simon Gagné called it "too much" while Gagné's teammate Martin St. Louis described it as a "slap in the face". Oilers head coach Tom Renney defended Omark, telling those who did not like the move to "deal with it". Omark scored his first NHL goal on 16 December against Steve Mason of the Columbus Blue Jackets, also recording two assists in the 6–3 Oilers victory. By season's end, Omark had dressed for 51 games with the Oilers, recording five goals and 27 points. With the Oilers missing the 2011 Stanley Cup playoffs, Omark returned to Oklahoma City and finished with 14 goals and 31 points in 28 games. He added one goal and three points in the Barons' first round playoff loss.

After going pointless in five games, and scratched for five, Omark was demoted to the minors.

As a restricted free agent and unable to cement a position within the Oilers, Omark left the Oilers and agreed to a one-year contract with Swiss club EV Zug on 29 August 2012. In the 2012–13 season, due to the 2012–13 NHL lockout, Zug was further strengthened by the presence of Henrik Zetterberg and Damien Brunner. Forming the top offensive line of the National League A, Omark remained with the club for the duration of the season, finishing with 69 points in 48 games to lead the league.

On 27 August 2013, off the back of his successful season in Switzerland, Omark returned to the Oilers organization, signing a one-year, two-way contract. On 19 December 2013, the Buffalo Sabres acquired Omark from the Oilers in exchange for a conditional sixth-round draft pick. On 7 February 2014, Omark was placed on waivers by the Sabres after scoring no goals and two assists in 13 games with the Sabres. He refused to report to the Rochester Americans, Buffalo's AHL affiliate, after clearing waivers, prompting the Sabres to terminate his contract and place him on unconditional waivers, which he cleared. After the incident, Omark indicated that he would return to Europe to continue his professional career. On 19 February, it was announced that Omark had re-joined his original club, Luleå HF, for the remainder of the season.

On 26 March 2020, Omark returned to the National League and joined Genève-Servette HC on a two-year deal worth CHF 2 million. On 2 December 2020, Omark was fined CHF 2,000 for embellishment in a game against the SC Rapperswil-Jona Lakers on 27 November 2020. Omark badly reacted to the punishment and decided to take matter into his own hands by tweeting his disagreement to the NL account, despite being asked not to do it from Servette's management.

Omark later returned to sign a two-year contract for a fourth stint with hometown club, Luleå HF, in which he helped the club claim its first Swedish Championship in 29 years in the 2024–25 season. Upon claiming the Le Mat Trophy, Omark announced it would be his last season with Luleå HF.

On April 15, 2026, Omark announced his retirement from professional hockey.

== International play ==
Medal record

Representing Sweden

Ice hockey

World Championships
| Gold medal – first place | 2017 Germany/France | |
| Bronze medal – third place | 2010 Germany | |
| Bronze medal – third place | 2009 Switzerland | |

Omark has represented Sweden several times. He made his international debut with the junior team at the 2007 World Junior Championships in his native country, scoring five points in seven games to help Sweden to a fourth-place finish in the tournament. He made his senior international debut at the 2009 IIHF World Championship in Switzerland. Omark recorded ten points in nine games as Sweden captured the bronze medal. He again represented his country at the 2010 IIHF World Championship in Germany, and Sweden won another bronze medal with Omark recording four points.

== Personal life ==
Omark is of Tornedalian descent.

== Career statistics ==
=== Regular season and playoffs ===
| | | | Regular season | | | | | Playoffs |
| Season | Team | League | GP | G | A | Pts | PIM | GP | G | A | Pts | PIM |
|---|---|---|---|---|---|---|---|---|---|---|---|---|
| 2003–04 | Luleå HF | J18 Allsv | 14 | 14 | 8 | 22 | 18 | 7 | 3 | 4 | 7 | 0 |
| 2003–04 | Luleå HF | J20 | 1 | 0 | 0 | 0 | 0 | — | — | — | — | — |
| 2004–05 | Luleå HF | J18 Allsv | 1 | 2 | 0 | 2 | 0 | — | — | — | — | — |
| 2004–05 | Luleå HF | J20 | 32 | 8 | 9 | 17 | 44 | 7 | 4 | 2 | 6 | 2 |
| 2005–06 | Luleå HF | J20 | 32 | 22 | 21 | 43 | 56 | 5 | 1 | 2 | 3 | 28 |
| 2005–06 | Luleå HF | SEL | 19 | 0 | 1 | 1 | 10 | 3 | 0 | 0 | 0 | 0 |
| 2006–07 | Luleå HF | SEL | 50 | 8 | 9 | 17 | 32 | 4 | 1 | 0 | 1 | 2 |
| 2007–08 | Luleå HF | SEL | 55 | 11 | 21 | 32 | 46 | — | — | — | — | — |
| 2008–09 | Luleå HF | SEL | 53 | 23 | 32 | 55 | 66 | 5 | 0 | 5 | 5 | 4 |
| 2009–10 | Dynamo Moscow | KHL | 56 | 20 | 16 | 36 | 34 | 4 | 0 | 0 | 0 | 4 |
| 2010–11 | Oklahoma City Barons | AHL | 28 | 14 | 17 | 31 | 32 | 6 | 1 | 2 | 3 | 4 |
| 2010–11 | Edmonton Oilers | NHL | 51 | 5 | 22 | 27 | 26 | — | — | — | — | — |
| 2011–12 | Oklahoma City Barons | AHL | 18 | 6 | 10 | 16 | 8 | — | — | — | — | — |
| 2011–12 | Edmonton Oilers | NHL | 14 | 3 | 0 | 3 | 8 | — | — | — | — | — |
| 2012–13 | EV Zug | NLA | 48 | 17 | 52 | 69 | 40 | 12 | 2 | 4 | 6 | 12 |
| 2013–14 | Oklahoma City Barons | AHL | 29 | 14 | 15 | 29 | 18 | — | — | — | — | — |
| 2013–14 | Edmonton Oilers | NHL | 1 | 0 | 0 | 0 | 0 | — | — | — | — | — |
| 2013–14 | Buffalo Sabres | NHL | 13 | 0 | 2 | 2 | 6 | — | — | — | — | — |
| 2013–14 | Luleå HF | SHL | 5 | 1 | 3 | 4 | 0 | 6 | 2 | 3 | 5 | 0 |
| 2014–15 | Jokerit | KHL | 60 | 16 | 30 | 46 | 26 | 10 | 3 | 6 | 9 | 12 |
| 2015–16 | Salavat Yulaev Ufa | KHL | 60 | 18 | 39 | 57 | 40 | 19 | 5 | 11 | 16 | 20 |
| 2016–17 | Salavat Yulaev Ufa | KHL | 55 | 14 | 42 | 56 | 38 | 5 | 1 | 3 | 4 | 2 |
| 2017–18 | Salavat Yulaev Ufa | KHL | 55 | 16 | 39 | 55 | 60 | 14 | 4 | 13 | 17 | 33 |
| 2018–19 | Salavat Yulaev Ufa | KHL | 56 | 10 | 39 | 49 | 28 | 17 | 4 | 14 | 18 | 16 |
| 2019–20 | Salavat Yulaev Ufa | KHL | 59 | 12 | 42 | 54 | 36 | 6 | 1 | 11 | 12 | 0 |
| 2020–21 | Genève–Servette HC | NL | 49 | 22 | 39 | 61 | 55 | 10 | 1 | 9 | 10 | 10 |
| 2021–22 | Luleå HF | SHL | 52 | 21 | 37 | 58 | 32 | 17 | 4 | 13 | 17 | 10 |
| 2022–23 | Genève–Servette HC | NL | 52 | 16 | 40 | 56 | 40 | 18 | 6 | 6 | 12 | 16 |
| 2023–24 | Luleå HF | SHL | 52 | 14 | 26 | 40 | 40 | 7 | 0 | 3 | 3 | 4 |
| 2024–25 | Luleå HF | SHL | 50 | 12 | 22 | 34 | 14 | 12 | 5 | 5 | 10 | 0 |
| SHL totals | | | 336 | 90 | 151 | 241 | 240 | 54 | 12 | 29 | 41 | 20 |
| KHL totals | | | 401 | 106 | 247 | 353 | 262 | 75 | 18 | 58 | 76 | 87 |
| NHL totals | | | 79 | 8 | 24 | 32 | 40 | — | — | — | — | — |

=== International ===
| Year | Team | Event | Result | GP | G | A | Pts | PIM |
|---|---|---|---|---|---|---|---|---|
| 2007 | Sweden | WJC | 4th | 7 | 2 | 3 | 5 | 4 |
| 2009 | Sweden | WC | 3rd place, bronze medalist(s) | 9 | 2 | 8 | 10 | 14 |
| 2010 | Sweden | WC | 3rd place, bronze medalist(s) | 9 | 1 | 3 | 4 | 8 |
| 2016 | Sweden | WC | 6th | 8 | 0 | 6 | 6 | 2 |
| 2017 | Sweden | WC | 1st place, gold medalist(s) | 5 | 2 | 0 | 2 | 2 |
| 2018 | Sweden | OG | 5th | 4 | 0 | 7 | 7 | 0 |
| Junior totals | | | | 7 | 2 | 3 | 5 | 4 |
| Senior totals | | | | 35 | 5 | 24 | 29 | 26 |

== Awards and honours ==
| Award | Year |
SHL
| Le Mat Trophy (Luleå HF) | 2025 |
