= Erik Walli-Walterholm =

Swedish professional ice hockey winger (born 1999)

- Born: 27 February 1999 (age 27) Stockholm, Sweden
- Height: 190 cm (6 ft 3 in)
- Weight: 92 kg (203 lb; 14 st 7 lb)
- Position: Winger
- Shoots: Right
- SHL team Former teams: Timrå IK; Djurgårdens IF; MoDo Hockey
- NHL draft: 190th overall, 2017; Arizona Coyotes
- Playing career: 2017–present

Erik Walli-Walterholm (born 27 February 1999) is a Swedish professional ice hockey winger currently playing for Timrå IK in the Swedish Hockey League (SHL).

== Playing career ==
Walli-Walterholm made his SHL debut on 4 November 2017 in an away game against Färjestad BK. He was selected in the seventh round, 190th overall, of the 2017 NHL entry draft by the Arizona Coyotes.

== Career statistics ==
			Regular season					Playoffs
Season	Team	League	GP	G	A	Pts	PIM	GP	G	A	Pts	PIM
2016–17	Djurgårdens IF	J20	11	1	0	1	10	1	0	0	0	2
2017–18	Djurgårdens IF	J20	42	18	21	39	64	3	1	3	4	6
2017–18	Djurgårdens IF	SHL	20	2	0	2	0	—	—	—	—	—
2018–19	Djurgårdens IF	J20	29	16	14	30	71	5	3	2	5	6
2018–19	Djurgårdens IF	SHL	31	1	1	2	35	18	0	0	0	10
2019–20	Djurgårdens IF	SHL	20	1	1	2	6	—	—	—	—	—
2019–20	Timrå IK	Allsv	16	3	9	12	4	1	0	0	0	4
2020–21	Timrå IK	Allsv	44	7	7	14	49	15	4	5	9	6
2021–22	Timrå IK	SHL	50	2	5	7	10	—	—	—	—	—
2022–23	Timrå IK	SHL	52	9	7	16	35	7	0	0	0	0
2023–24	MoDo Hockey	SHL	52	6	9	15	22	—	—	—	—	—
2024–25	Timrå IK	SHL	52	8	6	14	50	6	2	0	2	4
SHL totals			277	29	29	58	158	31	2	0	2	14
