= Frédéric Allard =

Canadian ice hockey player (born 1997)

- Born: December 27, 1997 (age 28) Saint-Sauveur, Quebec, Canada
- Height: 6 ft 1 in (185 cm)
- Weight: 179 lb (81 kg; 12 st 11 lb)
- Position: Defence
- Shoots: Right
- SHL team Former teams: Luleå HF; EC VSV; Nashville Predators; Montreal Canadiens
- NHL draft: 78th overall, 2016; Nashville Predators
- Playing career: 2017–present

Frédéric Allard (born December 27, 1997) is a Canadian professional ice hockey defenceman for Luleå HF of the Swedish Hockey League (SHL). He was selected in the third round, 78th overall, by the Nashville Predators of the National Hockey League (NHL) in the 2016 NHL entry draft. Allard has also previously played for the Montreal Canadiens.

== Playing career ==
Allard played junior hockey for the Chicoutimi Saguenéens of the Quebec Major Junior Hockey League (QMJHL). After his selection by the Nashville Predators in the 2016 NHL entry draft, on September 30, 2016, Allard was signed to a three-year, entry-level contract. Allard skated four seasons for the Chicoutimi Saguenéens, tallying 34 goals and 177 points in 250 games while serving as an alternate captain in his final two campaigns.

Approaching the pandemic delayed 2020–21 season, and entering the final season of his entry-level contract with the Predators, Allard in order to continue playing accepted a European loan to Austrian ICE Hockey League club, EC VSV, on November 19, 2020. Initially assigned to Austria until the commencement of the Predators training camp, Allard having registered 2 goals and 3 points through 11 games was instead placed on waivers in order to continue his tenure with Villacher with the NHL season underway.

Allard placed third among the blueliners with 13 points in 25 games before he was reassigned by the Predators to the Chicago Wolves of the AHL on February 15, 2021. Producing 8 points through his first 7 games with the Wolves, Allard earned his first recall by the Predators on March 11, 2021, providing cover for injuries to star defenceman Roman Josi and Ryan Ellis. He made his NHL debut, playing almost 17 minutes for the Predators in a 6–3 defeat to the defending Stanley Cup champions, the Tampa Bay Lightning, on March 13, 2021.

During the 2021–22 season, Allard was traded by the Predators to the Los Angeles Kings in exchange for Brayden Burke on March 21, 2022. He was assigned to join AHL affiliate, the Ontario Reign, and immediately contributed offensively in posting 10 points through 15 games to end the regular season.

As a restricted free agent, Allard was re-signed by the Kings to a one-year, two-way contract extension on July 1, 2023. In the 2022–23 season, Allard continued on assignment with the Reign, however failed to repeat his offensive burst, in registering 2 goals and 7 points through 35 games.

On March 3, 2023, the Kings traded Allard to the Montreal Canadiens in exchange for Nate Schnarr, he was immediately reassigned to continue in the AHL with the Laval Rocket.

As a pending free agent from the Canadiens, Allard opted to halt his North American career in agreeing to a two-year contract with Swedish club, Luleå HF of the SHL, on May 9, 2023.

== Career statistics ==
			Regular season					Playoffs
Season	Team	League	GP	G	A	Pts	PIM	GP	G	A	Pts	PIM
2012–13	Séminaire St-François Blizzard	QMAAA	42	3	19	22	20	16	0	5	5	10
2013–14	Chicoutimi Saguenéens	QMJHL	61	4	19	23	26	3	0	1	1	2
2014–15	Chicoutimi Saguenéens	QMJHL	62	2	28	30	24	5	0	1	1	0
2015–16	Chicoutimi Saguenéens	QMJHL	64	14	45	59	34	6	1	2	3	0
2016–17	Chicoutimi Saguenéens	QMJHL	63	14	51	65	42	17	4	10	14	14
2017–18	Milwaukee Admirals	AHL	55	8	16	24	18	—	—	—	—	—
2017–18	Norfolk Admirals	ECHL	3	0	0	0	2	—	—	—	—	—
2018–19	Milwaukee Admirals	AHL	65	4	25	29	44	5	1	1	2	2
2019–20	Milwaukee Admirals	AHL	61	2	19	21	18	—	—	—	—	—
2020–21	EC VSV	IceHL	25	4	9	13	38	—	—	—	—	—
2020–21	Chicago Wolves	AHL	25	3	15	18	30	—	—	—	—	—
2020–21	Nashville Predators	NHL	1	0	0	0	0	—	—	—	—	—
2021–22	Milwaukee Admirals	AHL	36	1	4	5	12	—	—	—	—	—
2021–22	Ontario Reign	AHL	15	3	7	10	10	5	1	2	3	2
2022–23	Ontario Reign	AHL	35	2	5	7	30	—	—	—	—	—
2022–23	Montreal Canadiens	NHL	3	0	0	0	0	—	—	—	—	—
2022–23	Laval Rocket	AHL	5	0	0	0	4	1	1	0	1	2
2023–24	Luleå HF	SHL	38	2	7	9	12	7	1	0	1	2
2024–25	Luleå HF	SHL	52	5	17	22	38	17	3	18	21	33
NHL totals			4	0	0	0	0	—	—	—	—	—
SHL totals			90	7	24	31	50	24	4	18	22	35

== Awards and honours ==
Award	Year
SHL
Stefan Liv Memorial Trophy	2025
Le Mat Trophy (Luleå HF)	2025
