= 2024–25 SHL season =

- League: Swedish Hockey League
- Sport: Ice hockey
- Duration: 21 September 2024 – 11 March 2025; (Regular season); From March 2025; (Playoffs)

Regular season
- First place: Brynäs IF
- Top scorer: David Tomášek (Färjestad BK)
- Relegated to HockeyAllsvenskan: Modo Hockey

Playoffs
- Playoffs MVP: Frédéric Allard (Luleå HF)
- Finals champions: Luleå HF
- Runners-up: Brynäs IF

SHL seasons
- 2023–24 2025–26

The 2024–25 SHL season was the 50th season of the Swedish Hockey League (SHL). The regular season began on 21 September 2024, and ended on 11 March 2025, where it was followed by the playoffs and the relegation playoffs.

Having been promoted as the champions of the 2023–24 HockeyAllsvenskan season, Brynäs IF became the first promoted team to win the following regular season title – their first regular season title in forty-seven years – finishing five points clear of their closest competitors, Luleå HF.

For the second successive season, HV71 won the Play Out – defeating Modo Hockey 4–2, following four successive wins, relegating the latter after two seasons in the SHL.

Frölunda HC drew the highest average home league attendance with 11,359.

== Teams ==
SHL team map

The league consists of 14 teams; Brynäs IF returned to the SHL after one season in the HockeyAllsvenskan, where they won the 2023–24 title. IK Oskarshamn were relegated to the HockeyAllsvenskan at the end of the previous season, after five seasons in the SHL.

Team	City	Arena	Capacity
Brynäs IF	Gävle	Monitor ERP Arena	7,909
Färjestad BK	Karlstad	Löfbergs Arena	8,647
Frölunda HC	Gothenburg	Scandinavium	12,044
HV71	Jönköping	Husqvarna Garden	7,000
Leksands IF	Leksand	Tegera Arena	7,650
Linköping HC	Linköping	Saab Arena	8,500
Luleå HF	Luleå	Coop Norrbotten Arena	6,150
Malmö Redhawks	Malmö	Malmö Arena	13,000
Modo Hockey	Örnsköldsvik	Hägglunds Arena	7,265
Örebro HK	Örebro	Behrn Arena	5,150
Rögle BK	Ängelholm	Catena Arena	5,150
Skellefteå AIK	Skellefteå	Skellefteå Kraft Arena	6,001
Timrå IK	Timrå	SCA Arena	6,000
Växjö Lakers	Växjö	Vida Arena	5,700

== Regular season ==
Each team played 52 games, playing each of the other thirteen teams four times: twice on home ice, and twice away from home. Points were awarded for each game, where three points were awarded for winning in regulation time, two points for winning in overtime or shootout, one point for losing in overtime or shootout, and zero points for losing in regulation time. At the end of the regular season, the team that finished with the most points was crowned the league champion.

=== Standings ===
Pos	Team	Pld	W	OTW	OTL	L	GF	GA	GD	Pts	Qualification
1	Brynäs IF	52	26	8	3	15	168	123	+45	97	Qualification to Quarter-finals, Regular season winners and Champions Hockey League
2	Luleå HF (C)	52	22	11	4	15	157	129	+28	92	Quarter-finals and Champions Hockey League
3	Frölunda HC	52	25	7	2	18	139	116	+23	91	Quarter-finals and Champions Hockey League (Note: With Luleå HF finishing second and winning 2024–25 SHL Playoffs, the third CHL qualifying spot went to next best club in 2024–25 SHL regular standings not already qualified,Frölunda HC.)
4	Färjestad BK	52	23	6	7	16	180	153	+27	88	Qualification to Quarter-finals
5	Skellefteå AIK	52	25	3	3	21	142	138	+4	84	Qualification to Quarter-finals
6	Timrå IK	52	23	4	4	21	143	127	+16	81	Qualification to Quarter-finals
7	Rögle BK	52	21	5	8	18	126	129	−3	81	Qualification to Eighth-finals
8	Växjö Lakers	52	17	9	7	19	127	132	−5	76	Qualification to Eighth-finals
9	Örebro HK	52	18	4	9	21	138	143	−5	71	Qualification to Eighth-finals
10	Malmö Redhawks	52	18	6	5	23	123	147	−24	71	Qualification to Eighth-finals
11	Leksands IF	52	19	3	8	22	123	151	−28	71	
12	Linköping HC	52	15	8	8	21	139	145	−6	69	
13	Modo Hockey (R)	52	16	3	9	24	135	170	−35	63	Qualification to Play Out
14	HV71	52	13	6	6	27	127	164	−37	57	Qualification to Play Out

Source: SHL.se
Rules for classification: 1) Points; 2) Goal difference; 3) Number of goals scored
(C) Play-off Champions and Champions Hockey League; (R) Relegated

=== Statistics ===
==== Scoring leaders ====
The following shows the top ten players who led the league in points, at the conclusion of the regular season. If two or more skaters are tied (i.e. same number of points, goals and played games), all of the tied skaters are shown.

Player	Team	GP	G	A	Pts	+/–	PIM
(Czech Republic) David Tomášek	Färjestad BK	47	24	33	57	+5	43
(Sweden) Filip Hållander	Timrå IK	51	26	27	53	+16	18
(Sweden) Patrik Karlkvist	Örebro HK	51	19	30	49	+10	32
(Sweden) Jakob Silfverberg	Brynäs IF	52	23	24	47	+14	0
(Sweden) Oscar Lindberg	Skellefteå AIK	52	19	28	47	−1	44
(Sweden) Jonathan Dahlén	Timrå IK	46	17	29	46	+5	12
(Sweden) Oskar Steen	Färjestad BK	52	30	15	45	+19	40
(Finland) Henrik Borgström	HV71	49	19	26	45	−12	10
(Sweden) Viktor Lodin	Färjestad BK	50	17	27	44	+3	61
(Slovakia) Marián Studenič	Färjestad BK	50	14	30	44	+11	43

==== Leading goaltenders ====
The following shows the top ten goaltenders who led the league in goals against average, provided that they had played at least 40% of their team's minutes, at the conclusion of the regular season.

Player	Team	GP	TOI	W	L	GA	SO	Sv%	GAA
(Sweden) Ludvig Persson	Brynäs IF	23	1271:03	14	6	37	2	92.51	1.75
(Sweden) Arvid Holm	Rögle BK	35	2054:42	17	17	65	4	92.48	1.90
(Sweden) Tim Juel	Timrå IK	31	1749:51	14	14	56	2	92.92	1.92
(Sweden) Lars Johansson	Frölunda HC	32	1859:39	19	12	62	3	91.62	2.00
(Norway) Tobias Normann	Frölunda HC	22	1270:07	13	8	46	0	91.19	2.17
(Sweden) Matteus Ward	Luleå HF	32	1925:44	21	11	71	3	90.80	2.21
(Sweden) Jhonas Enroth	Örebro HK	26	1552:08	15	10	60	3	90.34	2.32
(Sweden) Jesper Myrenberg	Linköping HC	28	1569:59	13	14	62	3	91.28	2.37
(Sweden) Jacob Johansson	Timrå IK	24	1367:19	13	11	54	5	89.75	2.37
(Finland) Emil Larmi	Växjö Lakers	32	1908:23	13	18	76	3	90.04	2.39

== Playoffs ==
Ten teams qualify for the playoffs: the top six teams in the regular season have a bye to the quarterfinals, while teams ranked seventh to tenth meet each other (7 versus 10, 8 versus 9) in a preliminary playoff round.

=== Format ===
In the first round, the 7th-ranked team meets the 10th-ranked team and the 8th-ranked team meets the 9th-ranked team for a place in the second round. In the second round, the top-ranked team will meet the lowest-ranked winner of the first round, the second-ranked team will face the other winner of the first round, the third-ranked team will face the sixth-ranked team, and the fourth-ranked team will face the fifth-ranked team. In the third round, the highest remaining seed is matched against the lowest remaining seed. In each round the higher-seeded team is awarded home advantage. The meetings are in the first round played as best-of-three series, and in the later rounds as best-of-seven series. In the eighth-finals, the higher-seeded teams play at home for game 2 (plus 3 if necessary) while the lower-seeded teams play at home for game 1. In the later rounds, the higher-seeded teams are at home for games 1 and 3 (plus 5 and 7 if necessary) while the lower-seeded teams are at home for games 2 and 4 (plus 6 if necessary).

=== Playoff bracket ===
Eighth-finals; Swedish: Åttondelsfinal
7	Rögle BK	0
10	Malmö Redhawks	2
8	Växjö Lakers	2
9	Örebro HK	1

Quarter-finals; Swedish: Kvartsfinal
1	Brynäs IF	4
10	Malmö Redhawks	2
2	Luleå HF	4
8	Växjö Lakers	1
3	Frölunda HC	4
6	Timrå IK	2
4	Färjestad BK	2
5	Skellefteå AIK	4

Semi-finals
1	Brynäs IF	4
5	Skellefteå AIK	1
(Pairings are re-seeded after the first and second round)
2	Luleå HF	4
3	Frölunda HC	2

Finals
1	Brynäs IF	2
2	Luleå HF	4

=== Eighth-finals ===
==== (7) Rögle BK vs. (10) Malmö Redhawks ====
13 March	Malmö Redhawks	2–1	OT	Rögle BK	Malmö Arena	Recap
Axel Sundberg (1; PPG) – 4:23		First period		19:28 – Leon Bristedt (1; PPG)
No scoring		Second period		No scoring
No scoring		Third period		No scoring
Henrik Haapala (1) – 5:42		First overtime period		No scoring
Marek Langhamer (14 shots / 14 saves); Daniel Marmenlind (25 shots / 24 saves)		Goalie stats		Arvid Holm (28 shots / 26 saves)

15 March	Rögle BK	0–3	Malmö Redhawks	Catena Arena	Recap
No scoring		First period	2:31 – Joona Ikonen (1; SHG); 7:34 – Jakub Galvas (1); 13:43 – Axel Sundberg (2)
No scoring		Second period	No scoring
No scoring		Third period	No scoring
Arvid Holm (20 shots / 17 saves); Christoffer Rifalk (1 shot / 1 save)		Goalie stats	Daniel Marmenlind (25 shots / 25 saves)

Malmö Redhawks win series 2–0

==== (8) Växjö Lakers vs. (9) Örebro HK ====
13 March	Örebro HK	3–4	OT	Växjö Lakers	Behrn Arena	Recap
Elias Ekström (1) – 10:15		First period		No scoring
Patrik Puistola (1; PPG) – 19:50		Second period		3:09 – Robert Rosén (1); 11:58 – Dennis Rasmussen (1)
Milton Oscarson (1; EA) – 19:57		Third period		5:06 – Joel Persson (1)
No scoring		First overtime period		9:38 – Félix Robert (1)
Jhonas Enroth (32 shots / 28 saves)		Goalie stats		Adam Åhman (27 shots / 24 saves)

15 March	Växjö Lakers	1–4	Örebro HK	Vida Arena	Recap
No scoring		First period	8:32 – Patrik Puistola (2); 14:40 – Kalle Kossila (1)
No scoring		Second period	16:27 – Patrik Puistola (3; PS)
Emil Sylvegård (1) – 4:11		Third period	18:17 – William Wikman (1; ENG)
Adam Åhman (9 shots / 8 saves); Emil Larmi (9 shots / 7 saves)		Goalie stats	Jonas Arntzen (34 shots / 33 saves)

17 March	Växjö Lakers	3–0	Örebro HK	Vida Arena	Recap
Emil Larsson (1) – 18:00		First period	No scoring
No scoring		Second period	No scoring
Hugo Gustafsson (1; ENG) – 18:38; Hugo Gustafsson (2; ENG) – 19:45		Third period	No scoring
Emil Larmi (17 shots / 17 saves)		Goalie stats	Jonas Arntzen (24 shots / 23 saves)

Växjö Lakers win series 2–1

=== Quarter-finals ===
==== (1) Brynäs IF vs. (10) Malmö Redhawks ====
20 March	Brynäs IF	5–1	Malmö Redhawks	Monitor ERP Arena	Recap
Anton Rödin (1) – 7:07		First period	No scoring
Jordan Schroeder (1) – 0:32; Johannes Kinnvall (1) – 18:23		Second period	13:30 – Lassi Thomson (1; PPG)
Jakob Silfverberg (1) – 11:21; Tyler Vesel (1; ENG) – 16:21		Third period	No scoring
Ludvig Persson (25 shots / 24 saves)		Goalie stats	Daniel Marmenlind (24 shots / 20 saves); Oskar Blomgren (4 shots / 4 saves)

22 March	Brynäs IF	4–2	Malmö Redhawks	Monitor ERP Arena	Recap
Miks Indrašis (1) – 18:54		First period	7:43 – Robin Hanzl (1; PS)
Victor Söderström (1; PPG) – 6:52		Second period	No scoring
Jakob Silfverberg (2) – 7:18; Anton Rödin (2; ENG) – 18:50		Third period	11:19 – Teemu Kivihalme (1)
Ludvig Persson (23 shots / 21 saves)		Goalie stats	Oskar Blomgren (24 shots / 21 saves)

24 March	Malmö Redhawks	2–0	Brynäs IF	Malmö Arena	Recap
Axel Sundberg (3; PPG) – 19:44		First period	No scoring
Thomas Berg Paulsen (1) – 17:55		Second period	No scoring
No scoring		Third period	No scoring
Oskar Blomgren (31 shots / 31 saves)		Goalie stats	Ludvig Persson (30 shots / 28 saves)

26 March	Malmö Redhawks	6–3	Brynäs IF	Malmö Arena	Recap
Axel Sundberg (4) – 2:41; Lassi Thomson (2) – 8:34; Linus Öberg (1) – 11:13		First period	20:00 – Jakob Silfverberg (3; PPG)
Joona Ikonen (2) – 19:50		Second period	8:52 – Jordan Schroeder (2)
Teemu Kivihalme (2) – 4:08; Joona Ikonen (3) – 15:04		Third period	7:48 – Jordan Schroeder (3; PPG)
Oskar Blomgren (32 shots / 29 saves)		Goalie stats	Erik Källgren (6 shots / 3 saves); Ludvig Persson (13 shots / 10 saves)

28 March	Brynäs IF	3–2	Malmö Redhawks	Monitor ERP Arena	Recap
Bobby Trivigno (1; SHG) – 3:12		First period	No scoring
Oskar Lindblom (1) – 0:31; Jakob Silfverberg (4; PPG) – 15:09		Second period	11:45 – Carl Persson (1)
No scoring		Third period	11:46 – Carl Persson (2)
Ludvig Persson (23 shots / 21 saves)		Goalie stats	Oskar Blomgren (29 shots / 26 saves)

30 March	Malmö Redhawks	2–5	Brynäs IF	Malmö Arena	Recap
No scoring		First period	15:15 – Theo Lindstein (1)
Lassi Thomson (3; PPG) – 9:03		Second period	6:49 – Linus Ölund (1); 19:13 – Oskar Lindblom (2)
Robin Salo (1; PPG) – 0:41		Third period	4:44 – Oskar Lindblom (3; PPG); 18:57 – Greg Scott (1; ENG)
Oskar Blomgren (30 shots / 26 saves)		Goalie stats	Ludvig Persson (20 shots / 18 saves); Erik Källgren (5 shots / 5 saves)

Brynäs IF win series 4–2

==== (2) Luleå HF vs. (8) Växjö Lakers ====
20 March	Luleå HF	4–0	Växjö Lakers	Coop Norrbotten Arena	Recap
No scoring		First period	No scoring
Albin Lundin (1) – 2:44		Second period	No scoring
Pontus Andreasson (1; PPG) – 1:38; Brendan Shinnimin (1; PPG) – 4:58; Eetu Koivistoinen (1; ENG) – 17:25		Third period	No scoring
Matteus Ward (16 shots / 16 saves)		Goalie stats	Emil Larmi (24 shots / 21 saves)

22 March	Luleå HF	6–2	Växjö Lakers	Coop Norrbotten Arena	Recap
Jesper Sellgren (1) – 13:11		First period	10:50 – Marcus Sylvegård (1)
Pontus Andreasson (2; PPG) – 7:49		Second period	16:41 – Keegan Lowe (1)
Brian O'Neill (1; PPG) – 6:59; Eetu Koivistoinen (2; PPG) – 15:39; David Lilja (1; ENG) – 18:24; Mathias Bromé (1; SHG/ENG) – 19:57		Third period	No scoring
Joel Lassinantti (20 shots / 18 saves)		Goalie stats	Adam Åhman (23 shots / 19 saves)

24 March	Växjö Lakers	4–3	2OT	Luleå HF	Vida Arena	Recap
Robert Rosén (2) – 12:44		First period		No scoring
Martin Lundberg (1) – 5:59		Second period		1:21 – Pontus Andreasson (3)
Martin Lundberg (2) – 10:47		Third period		6:27 – Markus Nurmi (1); 9:14 – David Lilja (2)
Karl Henriksson (1) – 11:02		Second overtime period		No scoring
Emil Larmi (40 shots / 37 saves)		Goalie stats		Joel Lassinantti (27 shots / 23 saves)

26 March	Växjö Lakers	3–4	OT	Luleå HF	Vida Arena	Recap
Dennis Rasmussen (2) – 8:31		First period		No scoring
No scoring		Second period		3:53 – David Lilja (3)
Robert Rosén (3; PPG/EA) – 17:09; Karl Henriksson (2; EA) – 18:50		Third period		9:51 – Brendan Shinnimin (2; PPG); 12:18 – Pontus Andreasson (4)
No scoring		First overtime period		16:07 – Pontus Andreasson (5)
Emil Larmi (23 shots / 19 saves)		Goalie stats		Matteus Ward (31 shots / 28 saves)

28 March	Luleå HF	3–2	OT	Växjö Lakers	Coop Norrbotten Arena	Recap
No scoring		First period		3:25 – Marcus Sylvegård (2); 16:02 – Martin Lundberg (3)
Mathias Bromé (2; PPG) – 8:52; Anton Levtchi (1) – 15:16		Second period		No scoring
No scoring		Third period		No scoring
Pontus Andreasson (6) – 3:30		First overtime period		No scoring
Matteus Ward (22 shots / 20 saves)		Goalie stats		Adam Åhman (25 shots / 22 saves)

Luleå HF win series 4–1

==== (3) Frölunda HC vs. (6) Timrå IK ====
21 March	Frölunda HC	2–4	Timrå IK	Scandinavium	Recap
No scoring		First period	14:51 – Magnus Pääjärvi (1, PPG)
Max Friberg (1; PPG) – 4:58		Second period	19:38 – Per Svensson (1)
Ivar Stenberg (1) – 6:46		Third period	17:48 – Sebastian Hartmann (1); 18:30 – Oliver Kapanen (1; ENG)
Lars Johansson (24 shots / 21 saves)		Goalie stats	Tim Juel (29 shots / 27 saves)

23 March	Frölunda HC	4–0	Timrå IK	Scandinavium	Recap
Dominik Egli (1; PPG) – 8:02		First period	No scoring
No scoring		Second period	No scoring
Dominik Egli (2) – 0:15; Isac Born (1; ENG) – 18:31; Dominik Egli (3; PPG) – 19:57		Third period	No scoring
Lars Johansson (16 shots / 16 saves)		Goalie stats	Tim Juel (24 shots / 21 saves)

25 March	Timrå IK	3–4	2OT	Frölunda HC	SCA Arena	Recap
No scoring		First period		No scoring
Erik Walli-Walterholm (1) – 2:58; Emil Pettersson (1; PPG) – 12:13; Magnus Pääjärvi (2; SHG) – 17:54		Second period		8:06 – Max Friberg (2)
No scoring		Third period		16:28 – Arttu Ruotsalainen (1; EA); 19:54 – Arttu Ruotsalainen (2; EA)
No scoring		Second overtime period		18:05 – Isac Born (2)
Tim Juel (40 shots / 36 saves)		Goalie stats		Lars Johansson (47 shots / 44 saves)

27 March	Timrå IK	2–1	Frölunda HC	SCA Arena	Recap
No scoring		First period	No scoring
Magnus Pääjärvi (3; PS) – 5:53		Second period	No scoring
Emil Pettersson (2; PPG) – 17:13		Third period	10:42 – Linus Weissbach (1; PPG)
Jacob Johansson (25 shots / 24 saves)		Goalie stats	Tobias Normann (25 shots / 23 saves)

29 March	Frölunda HC	6–2	Timrå IK	Scandinavium	Recap
Linus Weissbach (2) – 17:08; Noah Hasa (1) – 18:55		First period	18:14 – Erik Walli-Walterholm (2)
Jacob Peterson (1) – 9:58; Erik Thorell (1) – 17:50		Second period	No scoring
Mikael Ruohomaa (1; PPG – 13:44; Isac Born (3; SHG/ENG) – 16:45		Third period	4:44 – Oliver Kapanen (2)
Lars Johansson (31 shots / 29 saves)		Goalie stats	Jacob Johansson (21 shots / 16 saves)

31 March	Timrå IK	0–1	Frölunda HC	SCA Arena	Recap
No scoring		First period	17:50 – Ivar Stenberg (2)
No scoring		Second period	No scoring
No scoring		Third period	No scoring
Tim Juel (26 shots / 25 saves)		Goalie stats	Tobias Normann (29 shots / 29 saves)

Frölunda HC win series 4–2

==== (4) Färjestad BK vs. (5) Skellefteå AIK ====
21 March	Färjestad BK	6–2	Skellefteå AIK	Löfbergs Arena	Recap
Marián Studenič (1) – 0:20; Magnus Nygren (1) – 2:56; Joel Kellman (1) – 10:31		First period	0:54 – Jonathan Johnson (1)
Marián Studenič (2) – 3:16		Second period	17:32 – Andreas Johnsson (1)
Marián Studenič (3; ENG) – 16:27; August Tornberg (1; ENG) – 17:45		Third period	No scoring
Maxime Lagacé (3 shots / 2 saves); Anders Lindbäck (21 shots / 20 saves)		Goalie stats	Linus Söderström (21 shots / 17 saves)

23 March	Färjestad BK	1–4	Skellefteå AIK	Löfbergs Arena	Recap
No scoring		First period	3:01 – Andreas Johnsson (2); 7:34 – Michael Brandsegg-Nygård (1); 8:30 – Anton Heikkinen (1); 16:23 – Oscar Lindberg (1; PPG)
No scoring		Second period	No scoring
Marián Studenič (4; PPG) – 9:51		Third period	No scoring
Anders Lindbäck (23 shots / 19 saves)		Goalie stats	Linus Söderström (38 shots / 37 saves)

25 March	Skellefteå AIK	4–2	Färjestad BK	Skellefteå Kraft Arena	Recap
No scoring		First period	0:17 – Michael Lindqvist (1)
Pär Lindholm (1; SHG) – 5:02; Jonathan Davidsson (1) – 13:20		Second period	No scoring
Mārtiņš Dzierkals (1) – 6:05; Rickard Hugg (1; ENG) – 19:55		Third period	11:28 – Linus Johansson (1)
Linus Söderström (31 shots / 29 saves)		Goalie stats	Anders Lindbäck (26 shots / 23 saves)

27 March	Skellefteå AIK	6–2	Färjestad BK	Skellefteå Kraft Arena	Recap
Michael Brandsegg-Nygård (2; PPG) – 3:36; Pär Lindholm (2; PPG) – 5:37; Max Lindholm (1; PPG) – 10:01		First period	No scoring
No scoring		Second period	19:39 – Axel Bergkvist (1)
Oskar Vuollet (1) – 2:50; Oskar Vuollet (2; PPG) – 15:23; Anton Heikkinen (2; PPG) – 17:05		Third period	9:01 – Joakim Nygård (1; PPG)
Linus Söderström (34 shots / 32 saves)		Goalie stats	Anders Lindbäck (32 shots / 26 saves)

29 March	Färjestad BK	2–1	Skellefteå AIK	Löfbergs Arena	Recap
Per Åslund (1) – 4:53		First period	No scoring
Joel Kellman (2; PPG) – 15:54		Second period	11:26 – Max Lindholm (2)
No scoring		Third period	No scoring
Anders Lindbäck (24 shots / 23 saves)		Goalie stats	Linus Söderström (18 shots / 16 saves)

31 March	Skellefteå AIK	2–1	2OT	Färjestad BK	Skellefteå Kraft Arena	Recap
No scoring		First period		No scoring
Axel Sandin Pellikka (1) – 15:01		Second period		11:43 – Michael Lindqvist (2)
No scoring		Third period		No scoring
Rickard Hugg (2) – 0:36		Second overtime period		No scoring
Linus Söderström (33 shots / 32 saves)		Goalie stats		Anders Lindbäck (31 shots / 29 saves)

Skellefteå AIK win series 4–2

=== Semi-finals ===
==== (1) Brynäs IF vs. (5) Skellefteå AIK ====
4 April	Brynäs IF	4–1	Skellefteå AIK	Monitor ERP Arena	Recap
Charle-Édouard D'Astous (1) – 19:25		First period	No scoring
Tyler Vesel (2) – 8:24		Second period	No scoring
Oskar Lindblom (4; ENG) – 18:52; Bobby Trivigno (2; ENG) – 19:30		Third period	1:49 – Jonathan Johnson (2)
Erik Källgren (24 shots / 23 saves)		Goalie stats	Linus Söderström (25 shots / 23 saves)

6 April	Brynäs IF	4–3	Skellefteå AIK	Monitor ERP Arena	Recap
Linus Ölund (2) – 9:51; Greg Scott (2) – 10:58; Linus Ölund (3) – 12:00		First period	No scoring
No scoring		Second period	10:52 – Oscar Lindberg (2; PPG); 14:12 – Anton Heikkinen (3; PPG)
Linus Ölund (4) – 17:45		Third period	19:04 – Anton Heikkinen (4; PPG/EA)
Erik Källgren (22 shots / 19 saves)		Goalie stats	Linus Söderström (17 shots / 14 saves); Gustaf Lindvall (15 shots / 14 saves)

8 April	Skellefteå AIK	5–1	Brynäs IF	Skellefteå Kraft Arena	Recap
Jonathan Davidsson (2) – 1:54; Max Lindholm (3) – 4:25		First period	No scoring
Michael Brandsegg-Nygård (3; PPG) – 0:34; Pär Lindholm (3) – 12:08		Second period	No scoring
Michael Brandsegg-Nygård (4) – 6:05		Third period	14:08 – Oskar Lindblom (5; PPG)
Linus Söderström (25 shots / 24 saves)		Goalie stats	Erik Källgren (14 shots / 10 saves); Oscar Westman (6 shots / 5 saves)

10 April	Skellefteå AIK	3–4	Brynäs IF	Skellefteå Kraft Arena	Recap
No scoring		First period	6:08 – Charle-Édouard D'Astous (2); 14:37 – Jack Kopacka (1)
Pär Lindholm (4) – 4:14; Jonathan Johnson (3; PPG) – 11:08; Jonathan Pudas (1; PPG) – 17:21		Second period	No scoring
No scoring		Third period	1:09 – Jack Kopacka (2); 14:47 – Johan Larsson (1)
Linus Söderström (25 shots / 21 saves)		Goalie stats	Erik Källgren (26 shots / 23 saves)

12 April	Brynäs IF	4–1	Skellefteå AIK	Monitor ERP Arena	Recap
Charle-Édouard D'Astous (3; PPG) – 13:37		First period	18:12 – Andreas Johnsson (3; PPG)
Charle-Édouard D'Astous (4) – 2:23; Jakob Silfverberg (5; PPG) – 14:03		Second period	No scoring
Jack Kopacka (3; PPG) – 15:05		Third period	No scoring
Erik Källgren (25 shots / 24 saves)		Goalie stats	Linus Söderström (21 shots / 17 saves)

Brynäs IF win series 4–1

==== (2) Luleå HF vs. (3) Frölunda HC ====
5 April	Luleå HF	4–2	Frölunda HC	Coop Norrbotten Arena	Recap
Linus Omark (1) – 5:21		First period	No scoring
Pontus Andreasson (7) – 1:43; Mathias Bromé (3) – 19:32		Second period	6:46 – Noah Hasa (2); 15:57 – Henrik Tömmernes (1; PPG)
Pontus Andreasson (8) – 17:12		Third period	No scoring
Matteus Ward (25 shots / 23 saves)		Goalie stats	Tobias Normann (13 shots / 9 saves)

7 April	Luleå HF	2–5	Frölunda HC	Coop Norrbotten Arena	Recap
No scoring		First period	5:47 – Nicklas Lasu (1; SHG); 13:27 – Linus Högberg (1)
Pontus Själin (1) – 5:04; David Lilja (4) – 7:27		Second period	1:29 – Mikael Ruohomaa (2)
No scoring		Third period	8:44 – Ivar Stenberg (3); 9:15 – Max Friberg (3)
Matteus Ward (20 shots / 15 saves)		Goalie stats	Lars Johansson (19 shots / 17 saves)

9 April	Frölunda HC	5–3	Luleå HF	Scandinavium	Recap
Tom Nilsson (1) – 3:10; Mikael Ruohomaa (3) – 7:36		First period	18:32 – Mathias Bromé (4)
Max Westergård (1) – 7:20		Second period	13:00 – David Granberg (1); 14:54 – Isac Hedqvist (1)
Arttu Ruotsalainen (3; PPG) – 1:32; Linus Weissbach (3) – 14:43		Third period	No scoring
Lars Johansson (26 shots / 23 saves)		Goalie stats	Joel Lassinantti (27 shots / 22 saves)

11 April	Frölunda HC	2–3	3OT	Luleå HF	Scandinavium	Recap
Mikael Ruohomaa (4) – 1:42		First period		9:02 – Isac Hedqvist (2)
No scoring		Second period		No scoring
Isac Heens (1) – 11:19		Third period		18:41 – Linus Omark (2; EA)
No scoring		Third overtime period		1:27 – Linus Omark (3)
Lars Johansson (37 shots / 34 saves)		Goalie stats		Matteus Ward (38 shots / 36 saves)

13 April	Luleå HF	5–1	Frölunda HC	Coop Norrbotten Arena	Recap
Brendan Shinnimin (3) – 0:31; Pontus Andreasson (9) – 18:29		First period	No scoring
Einar Emanuelsson (1) – 3:21; Mathias Bromé (5) – 5:27; Brendan Shinnimin (4) – 10:58		Second period	No scoring
No scoring		Third period	0:24 – Max Friberg (4)
Matteus Ward (17 shots / 16 saves)		Goalie stats	Tobias Normann (13 shots / 9 saves); Lars Johansson (5 shots / 4 saves)

15 April	Frölunda HC	0–2	Luleå HF	Scandinavium	Recap
No scoring		First period	No scoring
No scoring		Second period	0:48 – Anton Levtchi (2)
No scoring		Third period	1:59 – Brendan Shinnimin (5)
Lars Johansson (11 shots / 9 saves)		Goalie stats	Matteus Ward (29 shots / 29 saves)

Luleå HF win series 4–2

=== Finals ===
==== (1) Brynäs IF vs. (2) Luleå HF ====
19 April	Brynäs IF	2–1	2OT	Luleå HF	Monitor ERP Arena	Recap
No scoring		First period		No scoring
No scoring		Second period		9:47 – Brian O'Neill (2)
Tyler Vesel (3) – 11:09		Third period		No scoring
Anton Rödin (3) – 5:25		Second overtime period		No scoring
Erik Källgren (27 shots / 26 saves)		Goalie stats		Matteus Ward (43 shots / 41 saves)

21 April	Brynäs IF	2–5	Luleå HF	Monitor ERP Arena	Recap
No scoring		First period	1:05 – Pontus Andreasson (10); 6:40 – Anton Levtchi (3; PPG)
No scoring		Second period	10:17 – Brendan Shinnimin (6; PPG); 10:57 – Marcus Hardegård (1; PPG)
Jakob Silfverberg (6; PPG) – 6:46; Greg Scott (3) – 10:23		Third period	13:36 – Eetu Koivistoinen (3)
Erik Källgren (17 shots / 13 saves); Frans Tuohimaa (7 shots / 6 saves)		Goalie stats	Matteus Ward (32 shots / 30 saves)

23 April	Luleå HF	5–1	Brynäs IF	Coop Norrbotten Arena	Recap
Frédéric Allard (1) – 10:06		First period	7:51 – Axel Andersson (1)
Linus Omark (4) – 4:54; Frédéric Allard (2; PPG) – 8:27; Frédéric Allard (3; PPG) – 17:37		Second period	No scoring
Pontus Andreasson (11) – 3:36		Third period	No scoring
Matteus Ward (29 shots / 28 saves)		Goalie stats	Erik Källgren (22 shots / 17 saves)

26 April	Luleå HF	3–5	Brynäs IF	Coop Norrbotten Arena	Recap
Isac Hedqvist (3) – 17:11		First period	8:42 – Jack Kopacka (4); 12:02 – Jordan Schroeder (4; PPG); 13:57 – Oskar Lindblom (6)
Isac Hedqvist (4) – 8:28		Second period	No scoring
Eetu Koivistoinen (4) – 4:22		Third period	6:14 – Jakob Silfverberg (7); 19:44 – Bobby Trivigno (3; PPG/ENG)
Matteus Ward (22 shots / 18 saves)		Goalie stats	Ludvig Persson (18 shots / 15 saves)

28 April	Brynäs IF	2–6	Luleå HF	Monitor ERP Arena	Recap
No scoring		First period	0:23 – Brian O'Neill (3); 19:59 – Marcus Hardegård (2)
No scoring		Second period	10:56 – Linus Omark (5)
Greg Scott (4) – 0:38; Oskar Lindblom (7) – 5:04		Third period	6:42 – Brian O'Neill (4); 7:45 – Markus Nurmi (2); 19:14 – Mathias Bromé (6; PPG)
Ludvig Persson (21 shots / 15 saves)		Goalie stats	Matteus Ward (34 shots / 32 saves)

1 May	Luleå HF	5–2	Brynäs IF	Coop Norrbotten Arena	Recap
Pontus Andreasson (12) – 11:13; Marcus Hardegård (3; PPG) – 14:37		First period	7:30 – Johan Larsson (2)
Brendan Shinnimin (7) – 9:07		Second period	No scoring
Brian O'Neill (5; PPG) – 0:43; Brian O'Neill (6) – 2:31		Third period	3:31 – Theo Lindstein (2)
Matteus Ward (27 shots / 25 saves)		Goalie stats	Erik Källgren (19 shots / 14 saves)

Luleå HF win series 4–2

=== Statistics ===
==== Scoring leaders ====
The following players led the league in points, at the conclusion of games played on 1 May 2025. If two or more skaters are tied (i.e. same number of points, goals and played games), all of the tied skaters are shown.

Player	Team	GP	G	A	Pts	+/–	PIM
(Canada) Frédéric Allard	Luleå HF	17	3	18	21	+15	33
(Sweden) Pontus Andreasson	Luleå HF	17	12	8	20	+12	6
(United States) Brian O'Neill	Luleå HF	17	6	10	16	+4	6
(Sweden) Anton Rödin	Brynäs IF	17	3	12	15	+5	14
(Finland) Markus Nurmi	Luleå HF	17	2	12	14	+11	10
(Sweden) Oskar Lindblom	Brynäs IF	17	7	6	13	+3	4
(Sweden) Jakob Silfverberg	Brynäs IF	17	7	6	13	+5	2
(Canada) Brendan Shinnimin	Luleå HF	17	7	5	12	+5	28
(Sweden) Linus Weissbach	Frölunda HC	12	3	9	12	+5	27
(Sweden) Isac Hedqvist	Luleå HF	17	4	7	11	–1	26

==== Leading goaltenders ====
The following shows the top goaltenders who led the league in goals against average, provided that they have played at least 40% of their team's minutes, at the conclusion of games played on 1 May 2025.

Player	Team	GP	TOI	W	L	GA	SO	Sv%	GAA
(Norway) Jonas Arntzen	Örebro HK	2	118:15	1	1	2	0	96.55	1.01
(Sweden) Matteus Ward	Luleå HF	14	920:23	11	3	28	2	92.73	1.83
(Sweden) Lars Johansson	Frölunda HC	9	568:42	5	3	19	1	91.20	2.00
(Sweden) Tim Juel	Timrå IK	4	277:03	1	3	10	0	91.60	2.17
(Finland) Emil Larmi	Växjö Lakers	5	328:50	2	3	12	1	89.38	2.19

== Play Out ==
The two bottom-placed teams from the regular season (Modo Hockey and HV71) played a best-of-seven series, with the winner remaining in the SHL and the loser relegated to the second tier, the HockeyAllsvenskan. The higher-seeded team held home advantage over the series, playing at home for the first two games and game five, while the lower-seeded team was at home for games three, four and six.

14 March	Modo Hockey	4–2	HV71	Hägglunds Arena	Recap
Tobias Winberg (1) – 11:39		First period	10:17 – Tommi Tikka (1)
No scoring		Second period	No scoring
Mikkel Aagaard (1; PPG) – 3:02; Lukáš Jašek (1; PPG) – 12:47; Sebastian Ohlsson (1; ENG) – 18:57		Third period	13:52 – Jamiro Reber (1)
Lassi Lehtinen (29 shots / 27 saves)		Goalie stats	Hugo Alnefelt (16 shots / 13 saves)

16 March	Modo Hockey	3–2	HV71	Hägglunds Arena	Recap
Mikkel Aagaard (2) – 19:58		First period	No scoring
Riley Woods (1) – 3:57; Victor Berglund (1) – 11:37		Second period	13:18 – Joona Luoto (1)
No scoring		Third period	1:44 – Oskar Stål-Lyrenäs (1)
Lassi Lehtinen (23 shots / 21 saves)		Goalie stats	Frederik Dichow (29 shots / 26 saves)

19 March	HV71	5–0	Modo Hockey	Husqvarna Garden	Recap
Tommi Tikka (2) – 8:24; Oskar Stål-Lyrenäs (2) – 10:07; André Petersson (1) – 18:18		First period	No scoring
André Petersson (2) – 17:17		Second period	No scoring
Tanner Kero (1; PPG) – 16:50		Third period	No scoring
Frederik Dichow (20 shots / 20 saves)		Goalie stats	Lassi Lehtinen (30 shots / 25 saves)

21 March	HV71	4–3	OT	Modo Hockey	Husqvarna Garden	Recap
Joona Luoto (2) – 0:23		First period		5:38 – Tyler Benson (1)
Oskar Stål-Lyrenäs (3) – 2:06; André Petersson (3; PPG) – 6:17		Second period		11:54 – Oscar Pettersson (1)
No scoring		Third period		4:50 – David Bernhardt (1; PPG)
André Petersson (4) – 4:31		First overtime period		No scoring
Frederik Dichow (30 shots / 27 saves)		Goalie stats		Lassi Lehtinen (19 shots / 15 saves)

23 March	Modo Hockey	0–4	HV71	Hägglunds Arena	Recap
No scoring		First period	7:05 – André Petersson (5; PPG); 10:13 – Jamiro Reber (2; PPG); 10:50 – Oscar Fisker Mølgaard (1)
No scoring		Second period	No scoring
No scoring		Third period	14:26 – William Ignberg Nilsson (1; ENG)
Lassi Lehtinen (31 shots / 28 saves)		Goalie stats	Frederik Dichow (20 shots / 20 saves)

25 March	HV71	3–2	Modo Hockey	Husqvarna Garden	Recap
Oskar Stål-Lyrenäs (4) – 4:32		First period	No scoring
Oscar Fisker Mølgaard (2) – 1:08; Jonathan Ang (1; PPG) – 4:41		Second period	No scoring
No scoring		Third period	5:29 – Sampo Ranta (1); 19:18 – Sam Vigneault (1; EA)
Frederik Dichow (37 shots / 35 saves)		Goalie stats	Lassi Lehtinen (21 shots / 18 saves)

HV71 win series 4–2

== SHL awards ==
Award	Winner(s)
Guldhjälmen	David Tomášek (Färjestad BK)
Guldpucken	
Honken Trophy	Arvid Holm (Rögle BK)
Håkan Loob Trophy	Oskar Steen (Färjestad BK)
Rinkens riddare	Jakob Silfverberg (Brynäs IF)
Rookie of the Year	Melvin Fernström (Örebro HK)
Salming Trophy	Victor Söderström (Brynäs IF)
Stefan Liv Memorial Trophy	Frédéric Allard (Luleå HF)
Guldpipan	
