= Greg Scott (ice hockey) =

Canadian ice hockey forward (born 1988)

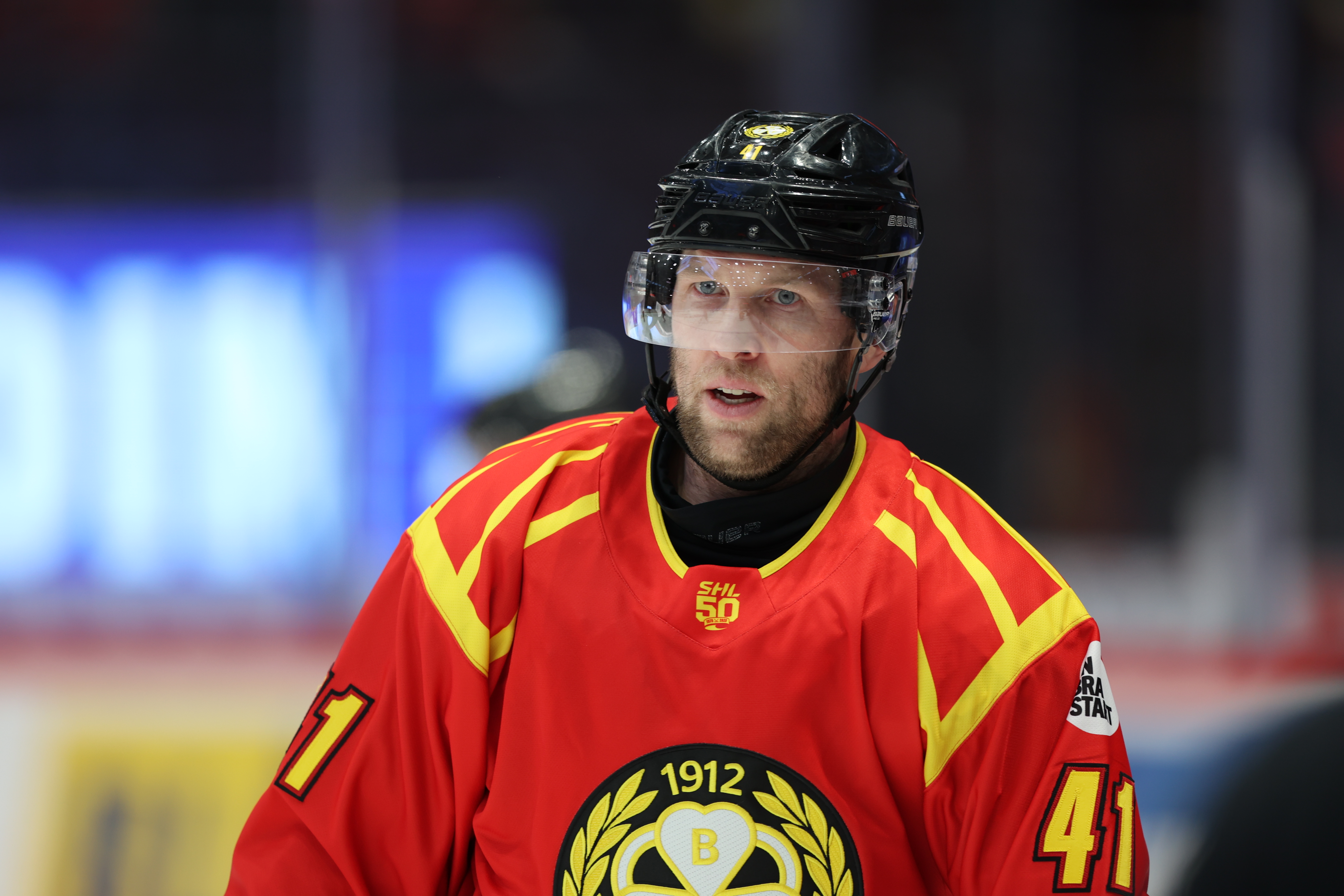
- Born: June 3, 1988 (age 38) Victoria, British Columbia, Canada
- Height: 6 ft 0 in (183 cm)
- Weight: 193 lb (88 kg; 13 st 11 lb)
- Position: Centre
- Shot: Right
- SHL team Former teams: Brynäs IF; Toronto Marlies; CSKA Moscow
- NHL draft: Undrafted
- Playing career: 2009–2026

Greg Scott (born June 3, 1988) is a Canadian ice hockey forward currently playing for Brynäs IF of the Swedish Hockey League (SHL). His older brother, Bobby Scott, was drafted by the Toronto Blue Jays in the 2004 First Year Player Draft in the 20th Round.

== Playing Career ==
Undrafted, Scott played major junior hockey with the Seattle Thunderbirds of the Western Hockey League. On July 4, 2008, Scott was signed to a three-year entry-level contract with the Toronto Maple Leafs. Throughout his tenure within the Maple Leafs, Scott was assigned to the Toronto Marlies of the American Hockey League. In 270 games in the American Hockey League, Scott was never called up for an NHL game, by the parent club, the Toronto Maple Leafs.

After the conclusion of the 2012–13 season with the Marlies, as an impending free agent with limited interest from NHL teams, Scott was signed to a one-year contract in Sweden with Brynäs IF of the Elitserien on May 29, 2013. He eventually spent three years with Brynäs before heading to Russia following the 2015–16 season, signing with HC CSKA Moscow of the Kontinental Hockey League on May 1, 2016.

In his third season with CSKA in 2018–19, Scott as an Alternate captain, contributed in a depth forward role posting 9 goals and 17 points in 45 regular season games. He recorded 1 goal in 10 playoff games to help CSKA capture their first Gagarin Cup in franchise history.

On June 26, 2019, having left Russia as a free agent, Scott returned to Sweden for a second tenure with Brynäs IF, securing a three-year contract.

== Career statistics ==
			Regular season					Playoffs
Season	Team	League	GP	G	A	Pts	PIM	GP	G	A	Pts	PIM
2004–05	Victoria Salsa	BCHL	7	1	1	2	0	—	—	—	—	—
2005–06	Seattle Thunderbirds	WHL	69	8	14	22	37	7	1	3	4	4
2006–07	Seattle Thunderbirds	WHL	72	18	14	32	62	11	0	2	2	2
2007–08	Seattle Thunderbirds	WHL	72	38	37	75	56	12	5	4	9	9
2008–09	Seattle Thunderbirds	WHL	65	32	44	76	39	5	0	6	6	2
2009–10	Toronto Marlies	AHL	71	10	22	32	28	—	—	—	—	—
2009–10	Reading Royals	ECHL	5	1	1	2	2	13	1	9	10	0
2010–11	Toronto Marlies	AHL	55	10	20	30	30	—	—	—	—	—
2011–12	Toronto Marlies	AHL	75	21	23	44	30	17	3	2	5	21
2012–13	Toronto Marlies	AHL	69	13	18	31	43	9	7	2	9	2
2013–14	Brynäs IF	SHL	53	17	19	36	10	5	1	0	1	2
2014–15	Brynäs IF	SHL	47	18	24	42	20	7	0	5	5	2
2015–16	Brynäs IF	SHL	52	16	23	39	16	3	1	2	3	0
2016–17	CSKA Moscow	KHL	46	13	13	26	45	5	1	1	2	2
2017–18	CSKA Moscow	KHL	36	6	7	13	10	19	2	3	5	4
2018–19	CSKA Moscow	KHL	45	9	8	17	24	10	1	0	1	2
2019–20	Brynäs IF	SHL	51	19	18	37	49	—	—	—	—	—
2020–21	Brynäs IF	SHL	25	8	9	17	29	—	—	—	—	—
2021–22	Brynäs IF	SHL	52	9	23	32	8	3	1	0	1	0
2022–23	Brynäs IF	SHL	49	14	9	23	24	—	—	—	—	—
2023–24	Brynäs IF	Allsv	35	5	14	19	6	13	6	6	12	8
2024–25	Brynäs IF	SHL	51	8	6	14	10	17	4	4	8	6
AHL totals			270	54	83	137	131	26	10	4	14	23
SHL totals			380	109	131	240	166	35	7	11	18	10
KHL totals			127	28	28	56	79	34	4	4	8	8

== Awards and honours ==
Award	Year
KHL
Gagarin Cup (CSKA Moscow)	2019
