= Pontus Andreasson =

Swedish ice hockey player (born 1998)

- Born: 24 August 1998 (age 27) Munkedal, Sweden
- Height: 178 cm (5 ft 10 in)
- Weight: 83 kg (183 lb; 13 st 1 lb)
- Position: Right wing
- Shoots: Left
- SHL team Former teams: Luleå HF; Frölunda HC
- NHL draft: Undrafted
- Playing career: 2018–present

Pontus Andreasson (born 24 August 1998) is a Swedish professional ice hockey forward currently playing for Luleå HF of the Swedish Hockey League (SHL). He previously played for Frölunda HC of the SHL.

== Playing career ==
Andreasson made his professional debut for Frölunda HC during the 2017–18 season, where he appeared in one game. During the 2021–22 season, in his first full SHL season with Luleå HF, he recorded 18 goals and 20 assists in 52 regular season game. He ranked second in goals (18), tied for first in assists (20), second in points (38), and second in power-play goals (5) among SHL rookies.

On 31 March 2022, in the first quarterfinals game of the SHL Playoffs, Andreasson recorded his first career hat-trick. On 8 April, he recorded the game-winning goal in double-overtime to send Luleå to the semifinals. This was his playoff-leading seventh goal in five quarterfinal games. He finished the playoffs with eight goals and five assists in 13 postseason games, helping Luleå reach the SHL finals.

On 16 May 2022, Andreasson signed a one-year contract with the Detroit Red Wings of the National Hockey League (NHL). In the 2022–23 season, Andreasson was assigned and played exclusively with the Red Wings American Hockey League (AHL) affiliate, the Grand Rapids Griffins, posting 12 goals and 25 points through 63 regular season games.

On 25 April 2023, as a pending free agent from the Red Wings, Andreasson opted to return to Sweden and sign a four-year contract with his former club, Luleå HF of the SHL.

== Career statistics ==
			Regular season					Playoffs
Season	Team	League	GP	G	A	Pts	PIM	GP	G	A	Pts	PIM
2016–17	Frölunda HC	J20	40	1	2	3	4	—	—	—	—	—
2017–18	Frölunda HC	J20	44	13	32	45	32	—	—	—	—	—
2017–18	Frölunda HC	SHL	1	0	0	0	0	—	—	—	—	—
2017–18	Hanhals IF	Div.1	11	7	3	10	10	—	—	—	—	—
2018–19	Frölunda HC	SHL	1	0	0	0	0	—	—	—	—	—
2018–19	Hanhals IF	Div.1	38	11	27	38	22	—	—	—	—	—
2019–20	IF Björklöven	Allsv	51	8	13	21	14	—	—	—	—	—
2020–21	IF Björklöven	Allsv	52	10	21	31	14	—	—	—	—	—
2021–22	Luleå HF	SHL	52	18	20	38	22	13	8	5	13	12
2022–23	Grand Rapids Griffins	AHL	63	12	13	25	30	—	—	—	—	—
2023–24	Luleå HF	SHL	51	9	17	26	24	7	1	1	2	6
2024–25	Luleå HF	SHL	52	6	22	28	49	17	12	8	20	6
SHL totals			157	33	59	92	95	37	21	14	35	24

== Awards and honours ==
Award	Year
SHL
Le Mat Trophy (Luleå HF)	2025
