= Markus Nurmi =

Finnish ice hockey player

- Born: 29 June 1998 (age 28) Turku, Finland
- Height: 196 cm (6 ft 5 in)
- Weight: 89 kg (196 lb; 14 st 0 lb)
- Position: Forward
- Shoots: Right
- SHL team Former teams: Luleå HF; TPS
- NHL draft: 163rd overall, 2016; Ottawa Senators
- Playing career: 2016–present

Markus Nurmi (born 29 June 1998) is a Finnish professional ice hockey forward currently playing with Luleå HF in the Swedish Hockey League (SHL). He was selected by the Ottawa Senators in the sixth round, 163rd overall, in the 2016 NHL entry draft.

== Playing career ==
Nurmi played as a youth within HC TPS organization and made his Finnish Liiga debut with TPS during the 2015–16 season.

Following his seventh season in the Liiga with TPS in 2021–22, Nurmi was signed as a free agent by the Nashville Predators to a one-year, entry-level contract on 10 June 2022. After attending the Predators training camp, Nurmi was reassigned to begin the 2022–23 season with American Hockey League affiliate, the Milwaukee Admirals. In a top six forward role, Nurmi contributed with 12 goals and 24 points through 48 regular season games with the Admirals, unable to earn a recall to the Predators.

As an impending restricted free agent with the Predators, Nurmi opted to return to his original Finnish club, TPS, in agreeing to a three-year contract on 3 April 2023.

== Career statistics ==
=== Regular season and playoffs ===
			Regular season					Playoffs
Season	Team	League	GP	G	A	Pts	PIM	GP	G	A	Pts	PIM
2013–14	TPS	Jr. A	1	0	0	0	0	—	—	—	—	—
2014–15	TPS	Jr. A	20	2	4	6	12	—	—	—	—	—
2015–16	TPS	Jr. A	49	19	17	36	34	2	0	0	0	2
2015–16	TPS	Liiga	2	0	0	0	0	—	—	—	—	—
2016–17	TPS	Jr. A	27	12	16	28	58	—	—	—	—	—
2016–17	TPS	Liiga	5	0	0	0	2	—	—	—	—	—
2016–17	TUTO Hockey	Mestis	11	2	0	2	2	6	0	1	1	4
2017–18	TPS	Liiga	51	10	11	21	14	11	0	1	1	2
2018–19	TPS	Liiga	60	1	11	12	20	5	0	1	1	0
2019–20	TPS	Liiga	57	14	14	28	28	—	—	—	—	—
2020–21	TPS	Liiga	46	18	18	36	22	13	2	4	6	6
2021–22	TPS	Liiga	56	20	19	39	49	18	4	15	19	4
2022–23	Milwaukee Admirals	AHL	48	12	12	24	14	—	—	—	—	—
2023–24	TPS	Liiga	56	14	19	33	12	9	5	3	8	10
2024–25	Luleå HF	SHL	44	10	14	24	19	17	2	12	14	10
2025–26	Luleå HF	SHL	51	15	17	32	50	14	0	1	1	30
Liiga totals			333	77	92	169	147	56	11	24	35	22

=== International ===
Year	Team	Event	Result	GP	G	A	Pts	PIM
2014	Finland	U17	4th	6	0	0	0	2
2016	Finland	U18	1st place, gold medalist(s)	7	0	2	2	0
2018	Finland	WJC	6th	5	1	2	3	2
Junior totals				18	1	4	5	4

== Awards and honours ==
Award	Year
SHL
Le Mat Trophy (Luleå HF)	2025
