= Matteus Ward =

Swedish ice hockey player (born 2001)

- Born: 3 July 2001 (age 24) Nyköping, Sweden
- Height: 183 cm (6 ft 0 in)
- Weight: 80 kg (176 lb; 12 st 8 lb)
- Position: Goaltender
- Catches: Left
- SHL team Former teams: Luleå HF; Linköping HC
- Playing career: 2020–present

Matteus Ward (born 3 July 2001) is a Swedish professional ice hockey goaltender. Ward currently plays for Luleå HF in the Swedish Hockey League (SHL).

== Awards and honours ==
Award	Year
SHL
Le Mat Trophy (Luleå HF)	2025
