= Mathias Bromé =

Swedish ice hockey player (born 1994)

- Born: 29 July 1994 (age 32) Örby, Sweden
- Height: 183 cm (6 ft 0 in)
- Weight: 83 kg (183 lb; 13 st 1 lb)
- Position: Winger
- Shoots: Left
- SHL team Former teams: Luleå HF; Mora IK; Örebro HK; Detroit Red Wings; HC Davos
- National team: Sweden
- NHL draft: Undrafted
- Playing career: 2013–present

Mathias Bromé (born 29 July 1994) is a Swedish professional ice hockey winger currently playing for Luleå HF of the Swedish Hockey League (SHL). Bromé made his Swedish Hockey League debut with Mora IK during the 2017–18 SHL season.

== Playing career ==
On 29 April 2020, Bromé as an undrafted free agent, signed his first NHL contract, agreeing to a one-year, two-way contract with the Detroit Red Wings. On 18 August 2020, Bromé agreed to return to former Swedish club Örebro HK on loan until the commencement of the delayed 2020–21 North American season.

Bromé notched 20 points through 23 SHL regular-season games with Örebro HK before returning to the Red Wings to attend training camp. Remaining on the roster to open the season, Bromé made his NHL debut in a 3-0 defeat against the Carolina Hurricanes on 14 January 2021. Playing in a fourth-line role, Bromé scored his first NHL career goal with the Red Wings on 20 February 2021, against the Florida Panthers. He was assigned briefly to American Hockey League affiliate, the Grand Rapids Griffins, before returning to finish out the season with the Red Wings, posting 2 points in 26 games.

As an impending free agent, Bromé left the Red Wings to return to Europe, joining Swiss club HC Davos of the National League (NL) on a two-year deal on 17 May 2021.

After completing the 2021–22 season with Davos, Bromé concluded his tenure with the club and opted to return to his native Sweden, signing a six-year contract through 2028 with former club Örebro HK on 9 May 2022.

== Career statistics ==
=== Regular season and playoffs ===
			Regular season					Playoffs
Season	Team	League	GP	G	A	Pts	PIM	GP	G	A	Pts	PIM
2010–11	Huddinge IK	J18	22	15	12	27	51	—	—	—	—	—
2010–11	Huddinge IK	J18 Allsv	18	8	8	16	12	—	—	—	—	—
2010–11	Huddinge IK	J20	4	1	0	1	0	—	—	—	—	—
2011–12	VIK Västerås HK	J18	18	9	15	24	8	—	—	—	—	—
2011–12	VIK Västerås HK	J18 Allsv	4	0	2	2	6	—	—	—	—	—
2011–12	VIK Västerås HK	J20	34	5	7	12	16	—	—	—	—	—
2012–13	VIK Västerås HK	J20	38	10	9	19	42	—	—	—	—	—
2013–14	VIK Västerås HK	J20	24	17	22	39	20	3	2	1	3	2
2013–14	VIK Västerås HK	Allsv	37	3	6	9	0	4	0	0	0	0
2014–15	VIK Västerås HK	J20	7	3	10	13	4	—	—	—	—	—
2014–15	VIK Västerås HK	Allsv	51	4	5	9	10	9	0	0	0	0
2015–16	Asplöven HC	Allsv	51	10	17	27	20	—	—	—	—	—
2016–17	Mora IK	Allsv	51	18	31	49	14	9	0	4	4	2
2017–18	Mora IK	SHL	52	9	12	21	18	5	2	0	2	2
2018–19	Mora IK	SHL	52	15	20	35	18	5	3	1	4	22
2019–20	Örebro HK	SHL	52	17	26	43	22	—	—	—	—	—
2020–21	Örebro HK	SHL	23	4	16	20	4	—	—	—	—	—
2020–21	Detroit Red Wings	NHL	26	1	1	2	8	—	—	—	—	—
2020–21	Grand Rapids Griffins	AHL	2	1	1	2	0	—	—	—	—	—
2021–22	HC Davos	NL	41	14	35	49	14	11	2	3	5	4
2022–23	Örebro HK	SHL	51	16	23	39	16	13	1	0	1	0
2023–24	Örebro HK	SHL	50	11	15	26	10	–	–	–	–	–
2024–25	Luleå HF	SHL	52	19	20	39	10	17	6	3	9	2
SHL totals			332	91	132	223	98	40	12	4	16	26
NHL totals			26	1	1	2	8	–	–	–	–	–
NL totals			41	14	35	49	14	11	2	3	5	4

=== International ===
Year	Team	Event	Result	GP	G	A	Pts	PIM
2022	Sweden	OG	4th	6	0	3	3	0
2022	Sweden	WC	6th	5	1	3	4	2
Senior totals				11	1	6	7	2

== Awards and honours ==
Award	Year
SHL
Le Mat Trophy (Luleå HF)	2025
