= Linus Weissbach =

Swedish ice hockey player

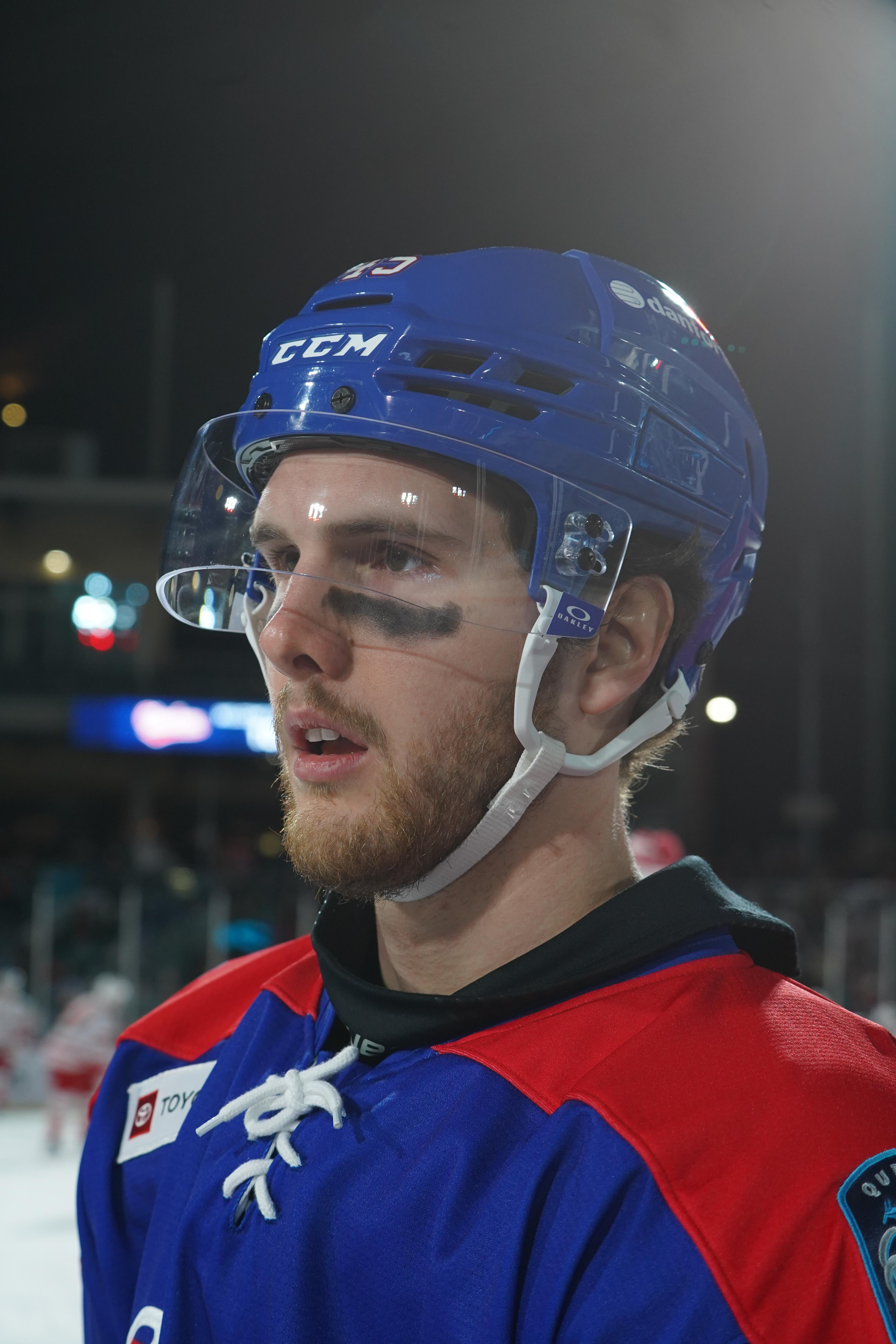
- Weissbach with the Rochester Americans in 2024
- Born: 19 April 1998 (age 28) Gothenburg, Sweden
- Height: 175 cm (5 ft 9 in)
- Weight: 80 kg (176 lb; 12 st 8 lb)
- Position: Left wing
- Shoots: Left
- KHL team Former teams: SKA Saint Petersburg; Rochester Americans; Frölunda HC
- NHL draft: 192nd overall, 2017; Buffalo Sabres
- Playing career: 2016–present

Linus Weissbach (born 19 April 1998) is a Swedish professional ice hockey left wing currently playing for SKA Saint Petersburg of the Kontinental Hockey League (KHL). He played collegiately for University of Wisconsin.

== Playing career ==
=== Amateur ===
Weissbach played at the junior level in North America for the Tri-City Storm of the United States Hockey League (USHL), and was named to the Third All-Star Team of the 2016–17 USHL season.

Weissbach committed and played for the University of Wisconsin. In his freshman season, he was named to the Big Ten Conference's All-Rookie Team. In his senior season, he helped Wisconsin win the Big Ten Conference and qualify for the NCAA national tournament. He was third in the nation with 41 points and second with 29 assists in 31 games. He was named to the Big Ten's Second All-Star Team, became a second-team All-American and received the Big Ten Medal of Honor. In his college career, Weissbach also received Academic All-Big Ten honors three times.

=== Professional ===
Weissbach was drafted in the seventh round, 192nd overall by the Buffalo Sabres in the 2017 NHL entry draft. Following the completion of his four-year collegiate career, the Sabres signed Weissbach to a two-year entry-level contract on 6 April 2021. At the conclusion of his entry-level contract, he signed a one-year, two-way extension with the Sabres.

Having played exclusively with Buffalo's AHL affiliate, the Rochester Americans, Weissbach left the organization as a free agent and returned to his original Swedish club, Frölunda HC of the SHL, on a two-year contract on 20 July 2024. He had surgery on his shoulder in 2025 and missed a part of the season.

In 2026, Weissbach signed a one year contract with SKA Saint Petersburg, competing in the Russian Kontinental Hockey League (KHL). He was the first Swedish player to switch from SHL to KHL since Russia's invasion of Ukraine.

=== National team ===
Weissbach won silver with Sweden's U18 team at the 2015 Hlinka Gretzky Cup.

He played for Sweden at the 2024 Karjala Tournament.

== Personal life ==
Weissbach graduated from the University of Wisconsin with a degree in communication arts and Scandinavian studies.

== Career statistics ==
=== Regular season and playoffs ===
			Regular season					Playoffs
Season	Team	League	GP	G	A	Pts	PIM	GP	G	A	Pts	PIM
2014–15	Frölunda HC	J20	16	2	4	6	6	—	—	—	—	—
2015–16	Frölunda HC	J20	44	17	31	48	34	3	1	1	2	0
2015–16	Frölunda HC	SHL	1	0	0	0	0	—	—	—	—	—
2016–17	Tri-City Storm	USHL	49	19	28	47	4	—	—	—	—	—
2017–18	U. of Wisconsin	B1G	34	10	16	26	26	—	—	—	—	—
2018–19	U. of Wisconsin	B1G	27	8	17	25	10	—	—	—	—	—
2019–20	U. of Wisconsin	B1G	35	4	18	22	25	—	—	—	—	—
2020–21	U. of Wisconsin	B1G	31	12	29	41	12	—	—	—	—	—
2021–22	Rochester Americans	AHL	67	16	21	37	32	1	0	0	0	0
2022–23	Rochester Americans	AHL	69	20	27	47	63	12	3	7	10	8
2023–24	Rochester Americans	AHL	55	16	17	33	22	5	1	0	1	4
2024–25	Frölunda HC	SHL	47	12	20	32	24	12	3	9	12	27
2025–26	Frölunda HC	SHL	33	5	12	17	2	1	0	1	1	0
AHL totals			191	52	65	117	117	18	4	7	11	12
SHL totals			81	17	32	49	26	13	3	10	13	27

=== International ===
Year	Team	Event	Result	GP	G	A	Pts	PIM
2014	Sweden	U17	3rd place, bronze medalist(s)	6	2	2	4	2
2015	Sweden	IH18	2nd place, silver medalist(s)	5	0	2	2	0
Junior totals				11	2	4	6	2

== Awards and honors ==
Award	Year
USHL
Third All-Star Team	2017
College
B1G All-Rookie Team	2018
B1G Second All-Star Team	2021
AHCA West Second Team All-American	2021
Big Ten Medal of Honor	2021
