= Daniel Marmenlind =

Swedish ice hockey player

- Born: 14 November 1997 (age 28) Uppsala, Sweden
- Height: 183 cm (6 ft 0 in)
- Weight: 88 kg (194 lb; 13 st 12 lb)
- Position: Goaltender
- Shoots: Left
- SHL team Former teams: Djurgårdens IF; Örebro HK; Malmö Redhawks
- Playing career: 2014–present

Daniel Marmenlind (born 14 November 1997) is a Swedish professional ice hockey player who is a goaltender for Djurgårdens IF of the Swedish Hockey League (SHL).

== Playing career ==
Marmenlind started his career in the youth ranks of Wings HC Arlanda, Djurgårdens IF and Örebro HK. In 2015–16, Marmenlind logged his first minutes in Sweden's top-flight Swedish Hockey League (SHL) with Örebro HK and was temporarily loaned to Wings HC Arlanda and IFK Arboga of the Swedish Hockeyettan.

Marmenlind was considered one of the top goaltender prospects in the 2016 NHL entry draft. Despite this he went undrafted in both 2016 and 2017.

== Career statistics ==
=== Regular season and playoffs ===
			Regular season									Playoffs
Season	Team	League	GP	W	L	T/OT	MIN	GA	SO	GAA	SV%	GP	W	L	MIN	GA	SO	GAA	SV%
2014–15	Örebro HK	J20	26	—	—	—	—	—	—	2.26	.923	3	—	—	—	—	—	3.30	.912
2015–16	Örebro HK	J20	33	—	—	—	—	—	—	2.93	.920	—	—	—	—	—	—	—	—
2015–16	Örebro HK	SHL	1	—	—	—	28	2	—	4.34	.750	—	—	—	—	—	—	—	—
