= Juuso Könönen =

Finnish ice hockey left winger

- Born: 11 June 1998 (age 28) Kuopio, Finland
- Height: 6 ft 0 in (183 cm)
- Weight: 181 lb (82 kg; 12 st 13 lb)
- Position: Left wing
- Shoots: Left
- Liiga team Former teams: Ilves; KalPa
- Playing career: 2017–present

Jusso Könönen (born 11 June 1998) is a Finnish professional ice hockey left winger currently playing for Ilves in Liiga.

Könönen has been with KalPa since 2012, playing in their Jr. C, Jr. B and Jr. A teams before making his debut for the senior team during the 2017–18 Liiga season, playing three games and scoring one goal.
