= Luleå HF =

Luleå Hockey
- City: Luleå, Sweden
- League: Swedish Hockey League
- Founded: 2 May 1977
- Home arena: Coop Norrbotten Arena
- Colors
- General manager: Thomas Fröberg
- Head coach: Thomas Berglund
- Captain: Erik Gustafsson
- Website: luleahockey.se

Franchise history
- 1977–1979: GroKo Hockey
- 1979–present: Luleå HF

Championships
- Le Mat Trophy: (1996, 2025)

Luleå Hockeyförening, also known as Luleå Hockey, is a professional ice hockey club from Luleå, Sweden. The club has been playing in the Swedish Hockey League (SHL), the top tier of ice hockey in Sweden, since the 1984–85 season. They are the northernmost team in the league and have won the Swedish championships twice, in 1996 and 2025. Since being promoted to the top flight (then called Elitserien) in 1984, the team has not once had to participate in a promotion/relegation-qualifier to defend their spot in the top league.

== History ==
Luleå Hockeyföreningen was formed on May 2, 1977 under the name GroKo Hockey, which was a merger of the ice hockey sections of IFK Luleå and Luleå SK. The name GroKo came from one of the main sponsors.

The 1995–1996 season saw Luleå HF winning its first Swedish Championship title, following a victory against Västra Frölunda HC, 3–1, in the final series.

On 16 December 2012, Luleå HF won the European Trophy by defeating Färjestads BK, 2–0, in the final game Slovnaft Arena in Bratislava.

Luleå HF also won the 2014–15 Champions Hockey League title by defeating Frölunda HC, 4–2, in the final series inside the Coop Arena in Luleå.

The 2024–2025 season saw Luleå HF winning its second Swedish Championship title, following a victory against Brynäs IF, 4–2 in the final series.

== Season-by-season record ==
This list features the five most recent seasons. For a more complete list, see List of Luleå HF seasons.

Season	Level	Division	Record		Avg. home atnd.	Notes	Ref.
Season	Level	Division	Position	W-OT-L	Avg. home atnd.	Notes	Ref.
2020–21	Tier 1	SHL	5th	24–4–8–16	550		
2020–21	Swedish Championship playoffs		—	3–0–1–3	0	Lost in quarterfinals 3–4 vs Skellefteå AIK	
2021–22	Tier 1	SHL	2nd	25–7–8–12	4,684		
2021–22	Swedish Championship playoffs		—	9–2–2–4	6,150	Won in quarterfinals 4–1 vs Örebro HK; Won in semifinals 4–1 vs Frölunda HC; (silver) Lost in finals 3–4 vs Färjestad BK	
2022–23	Tier 1	SHL	10th	18–4–9–21	6,000		
2022–23	Eighth-finals		—	2–1	5,868	Won 2–1 vs IK Oskarshamn	
2022–23	Swedish Championship playoffs		—	3–0–1–3	6,080	Lost in quarterfinals 3–4 vs Växjö Lakers	
2023–24	Tier 1	SHL	7th	21–7–3–21	6,724		
2023–24	Eighth-finals		—	2–1	6,150	Won 2–1 vs Örebro HK	
2023–24	Swedish Championship playoffs		—	0–0–1–3	6,150	Lost in quarterfinals 0–4 vs Växjö Lakers	
2024–25	Tier 1	SHL	2nd	22–11–4–15	7,103		
2024–25	Swedish Championship playoffs		—	10–2–2–3	6,150	Won in quarterfinals 4–1 vs Växjö Lakers; Won in semifinals 4–2 vs Frölunda HC; Won in finals 4–2 vs Brynäs IF; (gold) 2025 Swedish Champions (2nd title)	

== Players and personnel ==
=== Current roster ===
No.	Nat	Player	Pos	S/G	Age	Acquired	Birthplace
96	(Sweden)	Pontus Andreasson	C	L	28	2023	Munkedal, Sweden
86	(Sweden)	Mathias Bromé	W	L	32	2024	Örby, Sweden
14	(Sweden)	Jonas Berglund	C	L	35	2017	Älvsbyn, Sweden
10	(Sweden)	Einar Emanuelsson	RW	R	29	2016	Kiruna, Sweden
32	(Sweden)	Oscar Engsund	D	L	33	2025	Göteborg, Sweden
25	(Sweden)	Filip Eriksson	C	L	21	2025	Ljungby, Sweden
15	(Sweden)	David Granberg	C	L	21	2022	Piteå, Sweden
29	(Sweden)	Erik Gustafsson (C)	D	L	37	2018	Sundsvall, Sweden
8	(Sweden)	William Håkansson	D	L	18	2024	Solna, Sweden
6	(Sweden)	Isac Hedqvist	C	L	21	2022	Örnsköldsvik, Sweden
71	(Sweden)	Jakob Ihs-Wozniak	RW	R	19	2023	Adelaide, Australia
34	(Sweden)	Joel Lassinantti	G	L	33	2021	Luleå, Sweden
82	(Finland)	Otto Leskinen	D	L	29	2025	Pieksämäki, Finland
76	(Finland)	Anton Levtchi	LW	L	30	2024	Varkaus, Finland
51	(Finland)	Markus Nurmi	RW	R	28	2024	Turku, Finland
91	(United States)	Brian O'Neill	C	R	38	2024	Yardley, Pennsylvania, United States
23	(Sweden)	Jesper Sellgren	D	L	28	2022	Örnsköldsvik, Sweden
39	(Sweden)	Pontus Själin	D	L	30	2015	Östersund, Sweden
31	(Sweden)	Matteus Ward	G	L	25	2022	Nyköping, Sweden

=== Team captains ===
- Thorbjörn Köhler, 1979–84
- Lars Lindgren, 1984–88
- Lars-Gunnar Pettersson, 1988–92
- Stefan Nilsson, 1992–99
- Roger Åkerström, 1999–2005
- Mikael Renberg, 2005–07
- Anders Burström, 2007–11
- Niclas Wallin, 2011–12
- Chris Abbott, 2012–15
- Johan Harju, 2015–2017
- Niklas Olausson, 2017–2018
- Erik Gustafsson, 2018–present

=== Honored members ===
Luleå HF retired numbers
No.	Player	Position	Career	No. retirement
4	Stefan Nilsson	C	1984–1998, 2001–2004	6 January 2015
12	Johan Strömwall	C	1984–1998	October 1998
22	Hans Norberg	RW	1979–1983, 1985–1989	–
28	Roger Åkerström	D	1984–1991, 1994–2007	5 January 2017
35	Jarmo Myllys	G	1994–2001	23 November 2011

== Franchise records and leaders ==
=== Regular season ===
- Most goals in a season: Lars-Gunnar Pettersson, 30 (1990–91)
- Most assists in a season: Stefan Nilsson, 40 (1991–92)
- Most points in a season: Linus Klasen, 57 (2013–14)
- Most points in a season, defenseman: Timo Jutila, 37 (1991–92)
- Most shutouts in a season: Jarmo Myllys, 6 (1995–96, 1999–00) Anders Nilsson, 6 (2010–11) Johan Gustafsson, 6 (2011–12)
- Most penalty minutes in a career: Thomas Berglund, 1083

=== Scoring leaders ===
These are the top-ten point-scorers of Luleå HF since the 1984–85 season, which was their first Elitserien season. Figures are updated after each completed season.

- * – current Luleå HF player

Note: Pos = Position; GP = Games played; G = Goals; A = Assists; Pts = Points; P/G = Points per game;

Points
Player	Pos	GP	G	A	Pts	P/G
Stefan Nilsson	C	572	112	377	489	.85
Johan Strömwall	C	551	210	179	389	.71
Lars-Gunnar Pettersson	W	352	231	132	363	1.03
Lars Hurtig	W	425	194	165	359	.85
Thomas Berglund	C	669	102	251	353	.53
Lars-Göran Niemi	W	305	145	162	307	1.01
Niklas Olausson	C	433	94	192	286	.66
Lars Edström	LW	391	102	148	250	.64
Johan Harju	LW	472	127	110	237	.50
Mikael Renberg	RW	280	109	125	234	.84

== Trophies and awards ==
=== Team ===
- Le Mat Trophy (2): 1996, 2025
- Champions Hockey League (1): 2014–15
- European Trophy (1): 2012
- Tampere cup (1): 1995

=== Individual ===
Guldhjälmen

- Jarmo Myllys: 1996–97

Guldpucken

- Mikael Renberg: 2000–01

Håkan Loob Trophy

- Lars-Gunnar Pettersson: 1998–99

Honken Trophy

- Joel Lassinantti: 2014–15

Salming Trophy

- Erik Gustafsson: 2018–19

Rookie of the Year

- Jan Mertzig: 1995–96

Preceded by HV71	Swedish ice hockey champions 1996	Succeeded by Färjestad BK
