= 2016–17 Odense Bulldogs season =

Danish Hockey League season

2016–17 Odense Bulldogs
- 2016–17 record: 31–10–4
- Home record: 15–6–0
- Road record: 16–4–4
- Goals for: 143
- Goals against: 96

Team information
- Coach: Peter Johansson
- Assistant coach: Mads True
- Captain: Michael Eskesen
- Alternate captains: Simon Grønvaldt; Dale Mitchell
- Arena: Bryggeriet Vestfyens Arena

Team leaders
- Goals: Tony Romano (28)
- Assists: Dale Mitchell (40)
- Points: Dale Mitchell (67)
- Penalty minutes: Dale Mitchell (124)
- Goals against average: Tadeas Galansky (2.07)

The 2016–17 Odense Bulldogs season was the 26th season in the Danish Hockey League since the team was promoted in 1990.

There has been a lot of redeployments during the summer. Bulldogs did not extend the contract with coach Brad Gratton, and signed Frederikshavn coach Peter Johansson on a two-year contract.

Furthermore, a number of players have left the club, including stars such as Ryan McDonough, Sean Wiles and John Armstrong. However, Bulldogs has signed a lot of new players, such as the former Bulldogs-player Michael Eskesen.

Bulldogs finished as second in the regular season, for the first time since the 2011–12 season. They knocked out Rungsted 4–0 in the quarter-finals. They could not handle Gentofte in the semi-finals and lost 1–4. Then they were forced into a bronze medal-game against Frederikshavn, where they lost both games, 2–6 and 0–3.

== Preseason ==
=== Schedule and results ===
2016–17 Game Log: 3–6–0 (home: 0–3–0; road: 3–4–0)
#	Date	Home	Score	Visitor	OT	Decision	Attendance	Record
1	16 August	Odense	1–3	Esbjerg				0–1–0
2	19 August	Gentofte	2–4	Odense				1–1–0
3	26 August	Bayreuth	6–3	Odense				1–2–0
4	27 August	Most	2–4	Odense				1–3–0
5	28 August	Crimmitschau	5–3	Odense				2–3–0
6	2 September	Odense	1–3	Rungsted				2–4–0
7	9 September	Aalborg	3–2	Odense				2–5–0
8	13 September	Frederikshavn	1–4	Odense				3–5–0
9	15 September	Odense	1–5	Gentofte				3–6–0

== Regular season ==
=== League table ===
Pos	Team	Pld	W	OTW	OTL	L	GF	GA	GD	Pts	Qualification
1	Aalborg Pirates	45	27	4	2	12	133	94	+39	91	Qualification to Metal Ligaen Play-offs
2	Odense Bulldogs	45	22	9	4	10	143	96	+47	88	Qualification to Metal Ligaen Play-offs
3	Frederikshavn White Hawks	45	23	7	1	14	133	92	+41	84	Qualification to Metal Ligaen Play-offs
4	Esbjerg Energy	45	18	6	9	12	140	106	+34	75	Qualification to Metal Ligaen Play-offs
5	SønderjyskE	45	20	5	5	15	130	117	+13	75	Qualification to Metal Ligaen Play-offs

Updated to match(es) played on 28 February 2017. Source: Metal Ligaen

=== Schedule and results ===
2016–17 Game Log: 31–10–4, 88 Points (home: 15–6–0; road: 16–4–4)

September: 1–1–1, 3 Points (home: 0–1–0; road: 1–0–1)
#	Date	Home	Score	Visitor	OT	Decision	Attendance	Record	Pts
1	23 September	Odense	1–2	Aalborg		Galansky	1,282	0–1–0	0	Report
2	27 September	Frederikshavn	3–2	Odense	OT	Galansky	929	0–1–1	1	Report
3	30 September	Esbjerg	1–2	Odense	SO	Galansky	1,151	1–1–1	3	Report

October: 7–2–1, 20 Points (home: 4–1–0; road: 3–1–1)
#	Date	Home	Score	Visitor	OT	Decision	Attendance	Record	Pts	Recap
4	4 October	Odense	0–1	Gentofte		Galansky	768	1–2–1	3	Report
5	7 October	Odense	2–0	SønderjyskE		Galansky	1,409	2–2–1	6	Report
6	11 October	Odense	3–2	Herning	SO	Galansky	493	3–2–1	8	Report
7	14 October	Odense	5–4	Rungsted	SO	Galansky	1,092	4–2–1	10	Report
8	16 October	Gentofte	1–3	Odense		Galansky	327	5–2–1	13	Report
9	18 October	Odense	3–4	Rødovre		Galansky	897	5–3–1	13	Report
10	21 October	Herlev	4–7	Odense		Galansky	617	6–3–1	16	Report
11	22 October	Odense	5–1	Herlev		Galansky	955	7–3–1	19	Report
12	28 October	Rødovre	2–4	Odense		Galansky	1,256	8–3–1	22	Report
13	29 October	SønderjyskE	4–3	Odense	OT	Galansky	2,102	8–3–2	23	Report

November: 2–4–0, 6 Points (home: 2–1–0; road: 0–3–0)
#	Date	Home	Score	Visitor	OT	Decision	Attendance	Record	Pts	Recap
14	9 November	Rungsted	3–2	Odense		Galansky	1,084	8–4–2	23	Report
15	11 November	Herning	5–4	Odense		Galansky	1,325	8–5–2	23	Report
16	12 November	Odense	3–1	Esbjerg		Galansky	1,205	9–5–2	26	Report
17	25 November	Aalborg	4–1	Odense		Galansky	1,812	9–6–2	26	Report
18	26 November	Odense	4–2	Frederikshavn		Galansky	872	10–6–2	29	Report
19	29 November	Odense	0–2	Aalborg		Galansky	891	10–7–2	29	Report

December: 10–0–0, 27 Points (home: 4–0–0; road: 6–0–0)
#	Date	Home	Score	Visitor	OT	Decision	Attendance	Record	Pts	Recap
20	2 December	Frederikshavn	0–2	Odense		Galansky	1,214	11–7–2	32	Report
21	6 December	Esbjerg	1–2	Odense	OT	Galansky	1,099	12–7–2	34	Report
22	9 December	Odense	4–3	Gentofte	OT	Galansky	1,014	13–7–2	36	Report
23	10 December	Gentofte	0–4	Odense		Galansky	157	14–7–2	39	Report
24	13 December	SønderjyskE	2–3	Odense		Galansky	2,124	15–7–2	42	Report
25	16 December	Odense	4–2	Herning		Galansky	1,113	16–7–2	45	Report
26	20 December	Rungsted	3–4	Odense		Galansky	1,041	17–7–2	48	Report
27	22 December	Odense	6–1	Rødovre		Galansky	1,127	18–7–2	51	Report
28	29 December	Odense	2–1	Herlev	OT	Galansky	1,736	19–7–2	53	Report
29	30 December	Herlev	2–5	Odense		Galansky	432	20–7–2	56	Report

January: 5–2–2, 16 Points (home: 3–1–1; road: 2–1–1)
#	Date	Home	Score	Visitor	OT	Decision	Attendance	Record	Pts	Recap
30	3 January	Rødovre	2–1	Odense	SO	Galansky	784	20–7–3	57	Report
31	4 January	Aalborg	1–4	Odense		Galansky	1,303	21–7–3	60	Report
32	6 January	Odense	5–1	Rungsted		Galansky	1,254	22–7–3	63	Report
33	10 January	Odense	3–2	SønderjyskE	OT	Galansky	1,211	23–7–3	65	Report
34	20 January	Esbjerg	3–2	Odense	SO	Galansky	1,268	23–7–4	66	Report
35	21 January	Odense	0–2	Esbjerg		Galansky	1,321	23–8–4	66	Report
36	24 January	Odense	1–4	Frederikshavn		Galansky	955	23–9–4	66	Report
37	27 January	Odense	3–2	Aalborg		Galansky	1,642	24–9–4	69	Report
38	31 January	Frederikshavn	2–3	Odense		Galansky	1,392	25–9–4	72	Report

February: 6–1–0, 16 Points (home: 2–1–0; road: 4–0–0)
#	Date	Home	Score	Visitor	OT	Decision	Attendance	Record	Pts	Recap
39	5 February	Odense	3–2	Gentofte	OT	Galansky	1,323	26–9–4	74	Report
40	14 February	SønderjyskE	2–4	Odense		Galansky	2,535	27–9–4	77	Report
41	17 February	Herning	4–5	Odense	OT	Galansky	1,914	28–9–4	79	Report
42	18 February	Odense	1–3	Herning		Galansky	1,875	28–10–4	79	Report
43	21 February	Rungsted	2–3	Odense		Galansky	571	29–10–4	82	Report
44	24 February	Odense	11–1	Rødovre		Galansky	2,290	30–10–4	85	Report
45	28 February	Herlev	2–4	Odense		Galansky	655	31–10–4	88	Report

Legend: Win (3 points) Overtime/Shootout win (2 points) Loss (0 points) Overtime/Shootout loss (1 point)

=== Playoffs ===
2016 Metal Ligaen Play-offs

Quarter-final vs. Rungsted Seier Capital (8): Odense won 4–0
#	Date	Visitor	Score	Home	OT	Decision	Attendance	Series	Recap
1	March 3	Odense	2–1	Rungsted		Galansky	1,577	1–0	Report
2	March 5	Rungsted	2–4	Odense		Galansky	1,288	2–0	Report
3	March 7	Odense	3–2	Rungsted		Galansky	1,484	3–0	Report
4	March 10	Rungsted	1–5	Odense		Galansky	1,822	4–0	Report

Semi-final vs. Gentofte Stars (6): Gentofte won 4–1
#	Date	Visitor	Score	Home	OT	Decision	Attendance	Series	Recap
1	March 21	Odense	1–2	Gentofte	OT	Galansky	1,507	0–1	Report
2	March 24	Gentofte	2–0	Odense		Galansky	1,069	0–2	Report
3	March 26	Odense	1–2	Gentofte		Galansky	1,675	0–3	Report
4	March 28	Gentofte	1–2	Odense		Galansky	1,070	1–3	Report
5	March 31	Odense	0–2	Gentofte		Galansky	2,237	1–4	Report

Legend: Win Overtime/Shootout win Loss Overtime/Shootout loss

=== Bronze medal-game ===
7 April; 19:30	Frederikshavn	6–2 (1–1, 1–1, 4–0)	Odense	Scanel Hockey Arena, Frederikshavn; Attendance: 1,001

Game reference
Thomas Lillie	Goalies	Tadeas Galansky

8 April; 15:00	Odense	0–3 (0–3, 0–0, 0–0)	Frederikshavn	Odense Isstadion, Odense; Attendance: 911

Game reference
Tadeas Galansky	Goalies	Thomas Lillie

== Player statistics ==
Updated 31 March 2017

=== Skaters ===
Regular season
Player	GP	G	A	Pts	+/−	PIM
Dale Mitchell	44	27	40	67	+33	124
Tony Romano	42	28	26	54	+36	47
Sebastian Strandberg	40	13	32	45	+22	16
Rasmus Bjerrum	45	13	13	26	+15	12
Simon Grønvaldt	44	7	16	23	+20	20
Robin Sterner	43	7	13	20	+8	56
Martin Larsen	40	9	10	19	+23	45
Mathias Thinnesen	44	6	12	18	+8	14
Michael Eskesen	46	5	10	15	+33	22
Rasmus Lyø	40	4	10	14	+13	14
Mikkel Ankjær Nielsen	39	5	5	10	−2	52
Henrik Nielsen	43	3	7	10	+6	32
Jonas René Hansen	43	4	5	9	0	8
Frederik Høeg	37	3	4	7	−3	2
Oliver Larsen	31	1	6	7	+11	64
Asger Petersen	41	3	3	6	+5	22
Andreas Pedersen	45	2	4	6	+5	28
Mads Schaarup	39	1	4	6	+1	37
Frederik Sørensen	31	1	1	2	−4	18
Søren Pedersen	11	1	0	1	−2	2
Daniel Lundvald Nielsen	2	0	1	1	0	2
Matej Polata	19	0	0	0	−2	0
Christian Larsen	33	0	0	0	+3	0

Play-offs
Player	GP	G	A	Pts	+/−	PIM
Dale Mitchell	9	4	4	8	+3	14
Tony Romano	4	4	2	6	+7	12
Robin Sterner	9	3	3	6	+2	16
Henrik Nielsen	9	3	2	5	+3	6
Rasmus Bjerrum	9	2	2	4	+7	4
Mathias Thinnesen	9	0	3	3	+1	6
Rasmus Lyø	9	0	3	3	+3	0
Simon Grønvaldt	9	1	1	2	+2	2
Martin Larsen	9	0	2	2	+6	10
Michael Eskesen	9	0	2	2	+2	8
Oliver Larsen	9	1	1	2	+3	2
Andreas Pedersen	9	0	2	2	+3	6
Sebastian Strandberg	5	0	0	0	–4	14
Mikkel Ankjær Nielsen	9	0	0	0	–1	4
Jonas René Hansen	9	0	0	0	0	0
Frederik Høeg	9	0	0	0	–1	4
Asger Petersen	9	0	0	0	–1	2
Mads Schaarup	9	0	0	0	+1	2
Frederik Sørensen	9	0	0	0	0	2
Søren Pedersen	8	0	0	0	–2	0

=== Goaltenders ===
Regular season
Player	GP	GAA	SV%
Tadeas Galansky	45	2.07	.924

Play-offs
Player	GP	GAA	SV%
Tadeas Galansky	9	1.46	.938

== Continental Cup ==
=== Group stage ===
The Group D tournament was played in Odense, Denmark from 18 to 20 November 2016.

Pos	Team	Pld	W	OTW	OTL	L	GF	GA	GD	Pts	Qualification	NOT	ODE	ANG	DON
1	(United Kingdom) Nottingham Panthers	3	2	0	0	1	10	10	0	6	Qualification to Super Final	—	5–4	4–3	1–3
2	(Denmark) Odense Bulldogs	3	2	0	0	1	9	8	+1	6	Qualification to Super Final	4–5	—	3–2	2–1
3	(France) Ducs d'Angers	3	1	0	0	2	8	9	−1	3		3–4	2–3	—	3–2
4	(Ukraine) HC Donbass	3	1	0	0	2	6	6	0	3		3–1	1–2	2–3	—

Updated to match(es) played on 20 November 2016. Source: IIHF.com

==== Matches ====
18 November 2016; 20:00	Odense Bulldogs (Denmark)	4–5 (1–2, 1–2, 2–1)	(United Kingdom) Nottingham Panthers	Odense Isstadion, Denmark

Game reference

Tadeas Galansky
Goalies
Miika Wiikman
Referees:
(Sweden) Robin Berg
(United States) Brett Sheva
Linesmen:
(Denmark) Claus Hansen
(Denmark) Simon Mølgaard

	0–1	12:52 – O. Betteridge (R. Lachowicz, P. Kalus)
R. Sterner (S. Grønvaldt, R. Bjerrum) – 13:29	1–1
	1–2	16:58 – B. Moran (L. MacMillan, P. Kalus)
	1–3	25:15 – M. Carter (A. Nikiforuk, R. Lachowicz)
	1–4	29:43 – P. Kalus (A. Nikiforuk)
R. Sterner (R. Bjerrum, H. Nielsen) – 33:17	2–4
	2–5	46:23 – B. McGrattan (R. Farmer)
R. Lyø (F. Høeg) – 49:43	3–5
D. Mitchell (M. Thinnesen, O. Larsen) – 59:09	4–5

6 min
Penalties
6 min
33
Shots
34

19 November 2016; 19:00	Odense Bulldogs (Denmark)	2–1 (1–1, 0–0, 1–0)	(Ukraine) HC Donbass	Odense Isstadion, Denmark

Game reference

Tadeas Galansky
Goalies
Yevgeni Tsaregorodtsev
Referees:
(Russia) Denis Naumov
(United States) Brett Sheva
Linesmen:
(Denmark) Lasse Dahlerup
(Denmark) Simon Mølgaard

	0–1	11:44 – R. Blagoy
T. Romano (O. Larsen, D. Mitchell – 15:53	1–1
T. Romano (S. Strandberg, M. Larsen) (PP) – 45:57	2–1

10 min
Penalties
14 min
23
Shots
31

20 November 2016; 16:00	Ducs d'Angers (France)	2–3 (1–0, 0–1, 1–1)	(Denmark) Odense Bulldogs	Odense Isstadion, Denmark

Game reference

Léo Bertein
Goalies
Tadeas Galansky
Referees:
(Sweden) Robin Berg
(Russia) Denis Naumov
Linesmen:
(Denmark) Oliver Blach
(Denmark) Claus Hansen

	0–1	00:55 – R. Bjerrum (T. Romano)
M. Gagnon (G. Leveque) (PP) – 28:13	1–1
	1–2	29:15 – O. Larsen (T. Romano, D. Mitchell)
R. Gaborit (M. Gagnon) – 29:41	2–2
	2–3	57:59 – M. Eskesen (D. Mitchell, T. Romano) (PP)

12 min
Penalties
10 min
27
Shots
38

=== Final ===
Continental Cup Final tournament will be played from 13 to 15 January 2017. The host will be determined later.

Pos	Team	Pld	W	OTW	OTL	L	GF	GA	GD	Pts	Qualification
1	(United Kingdom) Nottingham Panthers	3	2	1	0	0	9	3	+6	8	Qualification to Champions Hockey League
2	(Denmark) Odense Bulldogs	3	1	0	1	1	6	6	0	4	
3	(Kazakhstan) Beibarys Atyrau	3	0	1	2	0	7	8	−1	4	
4	(Italy) Ritten Sport	3	0	1	0	2	5	10	−5	2	

First match(es) will be played: 15 January 2017. Source:

==== Matches ====
13 January 2017; 16:00	Nottingham Panthers (United Kingdom)	2–0 (0–0, 1–0, 1–0)	(Denmark) Odense Bulldogs	Arena Ritten, Italy; Attendance: 450

Game reference
Miika Wiikman	Goalies	Tadeas Galansky	Referees: (France) Oliver Gouin (Czech Republic) Ladislav Smetana; Linesmen: (Italy) Ulrich Pardatscher (Germany) Tobias Schwenk
B. Moran (S. Schultz, J. Williams) – 39:37 / 1–0; B. Moran (J. Brown) (PP) – 46:48 / 2–0			Referees: (France) Oliver Gouin (Czech Republic) Ladislav Smetana; Linesmen: (Italy) Ulrich Pardatscher (Germany) Tobias Schwenk
4 min	Penalties	6 min	Referees: (France) Oliver Gouin (Czech Republic) Ladislav Smetana; Linesmen: (Italy) Ulrich Pardatscher (Germany) Tobias Schwenk
32	Shots	29	Referees: (France) Oliver Gouin (Czech Republic) Ladislav Smetana; Linesmen: (Italy) Ulrich Pardatscher (Germany) Tobias Schwenk

14 January 2017; 19:00	Ritten Sport (Italy)	1–4 (0–1, 0–1, 1–2)	(Denmark) Odense Bulldogs	Arena Ritten, Italy; Attendance: 1,735

Game reference

Patrick Killeen
Goalies
Tadeas Galansky
Referees:
(France) Oliver Gouin
(Finland) Jari-Pekka Pajula
Linesmen:
(France) Yann Furet
(Germany) Tobias Schwenk

	0–1	15:01 – H. Nielsen
	0–2	21:12 – D. Mitchell (T. Romano, M. Larsen) (PP)
	0–3	49:16 – S. Strandberg (D. Mitchell)
D. Tudin (J. Sprukts, B. Cole) – 51:15	1–3
	1–4	58:03 – S. Strandberg (ENG)

30 min
Penalties
12 min
37
Shots
27

15 January 2017; 15:00	Odense Bulldogs (Denmark)	2–3 (1–0, 1–1, 0–1, 0–1)	(Kazakhstan) Beibarys Atyrau	Arena Ritten, Italy; Attendance: 550

Game reference

Tadeas Galansky
Goalies
Artyom Mikushin
Referees:
(Slovakia) Vladimir Baluska
(Russia) Mikhail Buturlin
Linesmen:
(France) Yann Furet
(Italy) Ulrich Pardatscher

R. Sterner (R. Bjerrum, F. Høeg) – 00:48	1–0
H. Nielsen (T. Romano, S. Strandberg) – 34:36	2–0
	2–1	39:05 – A. Ryzhikh (A. Zubkov)
	2–2	59:46 – M. Korobov
	2–3	64:35 – A. Vishnyakov (E. Sherbatov)

4 min
Penalties
4 min
25
Shots
45
