= 2017–18 Odense Bulldogs season =

2017–18 Odense Bulldogs
- 2017–18 record: 22–2–7–19
- Home record: 12–2–4–7
- Road record: 10–0–3–12
- Goals for: 141
- Goals against: 149

Team information
- Coach: Mikael Gath
- Assistant coach: Mads True
- Captain: Jacob Johnston
- Alternate captains: Dale Mitchell, Martin Larsen
- Arena: Ret&Råd Fyn Arena
- Average attendance: 1,240

Team leaders
- Goals: Dale Mitchell (21)
- Assists: Dale Mitchell (34)
- Points: Dale Mitchell (55)
- Penalty minutes: Anthony Camara (114)
- Plus/minus: Martin Larsen (12)
- Goals against average: Robin Rahm (2.45)

The 2017–18 Odense Bulldogs season is the 27th season in the Danish Hockey League since the team was promoted in 1990.

Following a semifinal exit the year before, head coach Peter Johansson left the club along with other star players, such as 16/17 league leading goalie Tadeas Galansky. Two time topscorer Dale Mitchell, was the only foreign player to extend his contract, making it his fourth year in a row as a Bulldog. Bulldogs signed 55-year old Finnish Kari Rauhanen as head coach. But after only ten regular season games, he decided to stop due to "personal matters". The board immediately hired Mikael Gath as new head coach.

Midway through the season, Bulldogs fired star-player Anthony Camara due to unacceptable behaviour.

== Significant events ==
- September 23: The board presents a financial deficit on 1.5 million DKK.
- October 11: Head coach Kari Rauhanen quits his job for personal reasons, and Mikael Gath was hired as new head coach.
- January 3: Anthony Camara gets fired due to unacceptable behaviour.
- February 12: Goaltender Robin Rahm leaves the club due to illness in near family. Hannu Toivonen signs as new goalie.
- February 27: The board presents that club desperately need one million DKK in one day to avoid bankruptcy.
- March 1: The board successfully reached 1.052.000 DKK before deadline.

== Preseason ==
The preseason was scheduled for five games, from August 18 to September 1. It should have been six games, but was shortened to five because of a cancel from Gamyo d'Épinal. Odense were supposed to host a four team-tournament between themselves, Rungsted Seier Capital, Eispiraten Crimmitschau and of course Épinal. But the French team did not want to participate anyway, so the tournament was rescheduled to a three team-tournament.

Bulldogs won four out of their five pre-season games. The only loss was against Rødovre Mighty Bulls, where they lost 3–0 on away ice.

=== Schedule and results ===
2017–18 Game Log: 3–1–0–1 (home: 2–1–0–0; road: 1–0–0–1)
#	Date	Home	Score	Visitor	OT	Decision	Attendance	Record
1	18 August	Rungsted	3–5	Odense				1–0–0–0
2	22 August	Odense	3–1	Hvidovre				2–0–0–0
3	29 August	Rødovre	3–0	Odense				2–0–0–1
4	31 October	Odense	2–1	Rungsted	OT			3–0–0–1
5	1 September	Odense	5–2	Crimmitschau				4–0–0–1

== Regular season ==
=== League table ===
Pos	Team	Pld	W	OTW	OTL	L	GF	GA	GD	Pts	Qualification
5	Esbjerg Energy	50	23	6	5	16	151	130	+21	86	Qualification to Quarter-finals
6	Rungsted Seier Capital	50	21	6	3	20	154	142	+12	78	Qualification to Quarter-finals
7	Odense Bulldogs	50	22	2	7	19	141	149	−8	77	Qualification to Play-in
8	Gentofte Stars	50	18	4	8	20	108	134	−26	70	Qualification to Play-in
9	SønderjyskE	50	18	4	7	21	135	143	−8	69	Qualification to Play-in

Updated to match(es) played on 27 February 2018. Source: Metal Ligaen

=== Schedule and results ===
The 2017–18 regular season schedule were published on July 5, 2017.

2017–18 Game Log: 22–2–7–19, 77 Points (home: 12–2–4–7; road: 10–0–3–12)

September: 4–0–2–2, 14 Points (home: 3–0–1–0; road: 1–0–1–2)
#	Date	Home	Score	Visitor	OT	Decision	Attendance	Record	Pts	Report
1	8 September	Odense	5–1	Aalborg		Rahm	1,625	1–0–0–0	3	Report
2	12 September	Gentofte	5–2	Odense		Rahm	257	1–0–0–1	3	Report
3	17 September	Odense	2–3	Hvidovre	OT	Rahm	904	1–0–1–1	4	Report
4	19 September	Rødovre	2–0	Odense		Rahm	658	1–0–1–2	4	Report
5	22 September	Odense	5–2	Frederikshavn		Rahm	1,282	2–0–1–2	7	Report
6	24 September	Frederikshavn	2–3	Odense		Rahm	1,034	3–0–1–2	10	Report
7	26 September	Herlev	5–4	Odense	OT	Lauridsen	515	3–0–2–2	11	Report
8	29 September	Odense	7–3	Esbjerg		Rahm	1,504	4–0–2–2	14	Report

October: 3–1–0–2, 14 Points (home: 3–1–0–1; road: 2–0–0–1)
#	Date	Home	Score	Visitor	OT	Decision	Attendance	Record	Pts	Report
9	1 October	Herning	2–4	Odense		Rahm	1,736	5–0–2–2	17	Report
10	13 October	Aalborg	4–1	Odense		Rahm	1,819	5–0–2–3	17	Report
11	17 October	Odense	3–2	Gentofte	SO	Rahm	1,140	5–1–2–3	19	Report
12	24 October	Odense	1–5	Rødovre		Rahm	837	5–1–2–4	19	Report
13	27 October	Odense	2–0	Rungsted		Rahm	1,402	6–1–2–4	22	Report
14	28 October	Rungsted	3–4	Odense		Rahm	702	7–1–2–4	25	Report
15	31 October	Odense	5–1	Herlev		Rahm	789	8–1–2–4	28	Report

November: 4–1–0–2, 14 Points (home: 1–1–0–1; road: 3–0–0–1)
#	Date	Home	Score	Visitor	OT	Decision	Attendance	Record	Pts	Report
16	3 November	SønderjyskE	1–7	Odense		Rahm	3,142	9–1–2–4	31	Report
17	5 November	Odense	2–1	Herning	OT	Rahm	1,205	9–2–2–4	33	Report
18	14 November	Hvidovre	2–4	Odense		Rahm	425	10–2–2–4	36	Report
19	17 November	Odense	4–0	SønderjyskE		Rahm	2,567	11–2–2–4	39	Report
20	21 November	Esbjerg	4–1	Odense		Rahm	1,312	11–2–2–5	39	Report
21	24 November	Odense	2–3	Aalborg		Rahm	1,399	11–2–2–6	39	Report
22	26 November	Gentofte	2–4	Odense		Rahm	176	12–2–2–6	42	Report

December: 5–0–2–3, 17 Points (home: 3–0–1–1; road: 2–0–1–2)
#	Date	Home	Score	Visitor	OT	Decision	Attendance	Record	Pts	Report
23	1 December	Rødovre	3–7	Odense		Rahm	1,053	13–2–2–6	45	Report
24	3 December	Frederikshavn	1–2	Odense		Rahm	1,077	14–2–2–6	48	Report
25	5 December	Odense	4–2	Rungsted		Rahm	937	15–2–2–6	51	Report
26	8 December	Herlev	3–2	Odense	OT	Rahm	412	15–2–3–6	52	Report
27	12 December	Odense	3–0	SønderjyskE		Rahm	1,001	16–2–3–6	55	Report
28	15 December	Herning	7–3	Odense		Rahm	1,626	16–2–3–7	55	Report
29	16 December	Odense	0–1	Hvidovre	OT	Rahm	876	16–2–4–7	56	Report
30	19 December	Odense	4–2	Esbjerg		Rahm	996	17–2–4–7	59	Report
31	22 December	Aalborg	6–2	Odense		Rahm	2,003	17–2–4–8	59	Report
32	30 December	Odense	2–3	Rødovre		Rahm	1,825	17–2–4–9	59	Report

January: 3–0–2–5, 11 Points (home: 2–0–1–2; road: 1–0–1–3)
#	Date	Home	Score	Visitor	OT	Decision	Attendance	Record	Pts	Report
33	2 January	Odense	4–5	Frederikshavn	SO	Rahm	777	17–2–5–9	60	Report
34	5 January	Rungsted	5–0	Odense		Rahm	852	17–2–5–10	60	Report
35	7 January	Odense	3–2	Herlev		Rahm	812	18–2–5–10	63	Report
36	9 January	SønderjyskE	4–3	Odense	SO	Rahm	2,372	18–2–6–10	64	Report
37	12 January	Odense	3–1	Gentofte		Rahm	1,725	19–2–6–10	67	Report
38	14 January	Odense	2–3	Herning		Rahm	1,088	19–2–6–11	67	Report
39	16 January	Hvidovre	1–4	Odense		Rahm	432	20–2–6–11	70	Report
40	23 January	Esbjerg	3–1	Odense		Rahm	1,134	20–2–6–12	70	Report
41	26 January	Odense	1–4	Aalborg		Rahm	1,416	20–2–6–13	70	Report
42	28 January	Gentofte	2–1	Odense		Rahm	382	20–2–6–14	70	Report

February: 2–0–1–5, 7 Points (home: 1–0–1–2; road: 1–0–0–3)
#	Date	Home	Score	Visitor	OT	Decision	Attendance	Record	Pts	Report
43	1 February	Rødovre	6–0	Odense		Rahm	2,645	20–2–6–15	70	Report
44	6 February	Frederikshavn	3–7	Odense		Rahm	1,243	21–2–6–15	73	Report
45	9 February	Odense	2–3	Rungsted	OT	Rahm	1,622	21–2–7–15	74	Report
46	11 February	Herlev	6–2	Odense		Rahm	420	21–2–7–16	74	Report
47	20 February	Odense	2–5	SønderjyskE		Toivonen	1,494	21–2–7–17	74	Report
48	23 February	Herning	8–2	Odense		Toivonen	1,815	21–2–7–18	74	Report
49	25 February	Odense	2–1	Hvidovre		Toivonen	998	22–2–7–18	77	Report
50	27 February	Odense	1–6	Esbjerg		Toivonen	777	22–2–7–19	77	Report

Legend: Win (3 points) Overtime/Shootout win (2 points) Loss (0 points) Overtime/Shootout loss (1 point)

== Player statistics ==
Updated 25 January

=== Skaters ===
Regular season
Player	GP	G	A	Pts	+/−	PIM
Dale Mitchell	47	21	33	54	0	73
Søren Nielsen	45	18	20	38	+6	36
Anthony Camara	27	15	22	37	+3	114
Rasmus Bjerrum	46	10	19	29	–7	28
Sebastian Ehlers	44	5	21	26	–1	16
Jacob Johnston	48	10	15	25	–9	36
Yannick Vedel	48	13	9	22	+2	12
Martin Larsen	48	8	12	20	+11	92
Nick Walters	48	5	14	19	+12	24
Henrik Nielsen	39	7	10	17	+9	30
Dylan Walchuk	48	3	13	16	–6	20
Jonas Hansen	48	5	7	12	+2	12
Andreas Pedersen	48	1	10	11	–6	30
Asger Petersen	40	4	4	8	+2	6
Ned Lukacevic	8	3	5	8	+6	–5
Jamie Lewis	30	1	6	7	–1	24
Mads Schaarup	48	1	6	7	–6	45
Nicolai Eriksen	30	2	2	4	–2	9
Frederik Sørensen	40	2	2	4	–8	32
Rasmus Knudsen	23	1	3	4	0	10
Jakob Wittendorf	42	3	0	3	–2	2
Lucas Bjerre Rasmussen	11	0	0	0	+1	4
Christian Larsen	37	0	0	0	–2	10

=== Goaltenders ===
Regular season
Player	GP	GAA	SV%
Robin Rahm	45	2.45	.921
Andreas Lauridsen	3	4.81	.859
Hannu Toivonen	2	5.84	.821

== Player of the Month ==
- September: Søren Nielsen
- October: Robin Rahm
- November: Dale Mitchell
- December: Yannick Vedel
- January: Robin Rahm
- February: Ned Lukacevic
