= 2014–15 Odense Bulldogs season =

2014–15 Odense Bulldogs
- 2014–15 record: 23–12–1
- Home record: 13–4–0
- Road record: 10–8–1
- Goals for: 118
- Goals against: 87

Team information
- General manager: Thomas Nielsen
- Coach: Brad Gratton
- Captain: Morten Andreasen
- Alternate captains: Mads Schaarup; Michael Daugulis
- Arena: Bryggeriet Vestfyens Arena
- Average attendance: 3,280

Team leaders
- Goals: Ryan McDonough (24)
- Assists: Dale Mitchell (25)
- Points: Ryan McDonough (46)
- Penalty minutes: Dale Mitchell (160)
- Goals against average: Chet Pickard (2.65)

The 2014–15 Metal Ligaen season was the 24th season in the Danish Hockey League since the team was promoted in 1990. The team has completed 26 transfers, 13 in and 13 out. They have furthermore got a new general manager, Brad Gratton, who switched from the league rivals from Rødovre Mighty Bulls.

Bulldogs finished as number 4 in the general classification, after a long period sitting in first place. They got knockout out in the quarter-finals by Esbjerg Energy.

== Regular season ==
=== League table ===
	Club	GP	W	OTW	OTL	L	GF	GA	Pts
1.	Herning	36	24	0	6	6	145	95	78
2.	SønderjyskE	36	21	2	5	8	133	90	72
3.	Frederikshavn	36	21	2	3	10	124	87	70
4.	Odense	36	17	6	1	12	118	97	64
5.	Esbjerg	36	15	6	2	13	146	125	59
6.	Rødovre	36	15	3	2	16	103	106	53
7.	Rungsted	36	14	2	1	19	110	130	47
8.	Aalborg	36	11	5	2	18	105	112	45
9.	Herlev	36	6	4	3	23	66	124	29
10.	Gentofte	36	5	1	6	24	83	167	23

2014–15 Game Log: 23–12–1, 64 Points (home: 13–4–0; road: 10–8–1)

September: 1–2–0, 3 Points (home: 1–0–0; road: 0–2–0)
#	Date	Home	Score	Visitor	OT	Decision	Attendance	Record	Pts	Recap
1	19 September	SønderjyskE	5–2	Odense		Pickard	2,256	0–1–0	0	Recap
2	26 September	Odense	3–2	Rødovre		Pickard	1,526	1–1–0	3	Recap
3	30 September	Gentofte	4–2	Odense		Pickard	316	1–2–0	3	Recap

October: 6–1–0, 12 Points (home: 4–1–0; road: 2–0–0)
#	Date	Home	Score	Visitor	OT	Decision	Attendance	Record	Pts	Recap
4	3 October	Odense	3–2	Herlev		Pickard	1,404	2–2–0	6	Recap
5	10 October	Odense	1–5	Aalborg		Pickard	1,777	2–3–0	6	Recap
6	17 October	Rungsted	1–3	Odense		Pickard	1,028	3–3–0	9	Recap
7	18 October	Odense	5–4	Esbjerg	SO	Pickard	1,247	4–3–0	11	Recap
8	24 October	Herning	2–3	Odense	OT	Pickard	1,676	5–3–0	13	Recap
9	26 October	Odense	3–2	SønderjyskE	OT	Pickard	1,517	6–3–0	15	Recap
10	31 October	Odense	6–4	Frederikshavn		Pickard	2,017	7–3–0	18	Recap

November: 6–0–0, 17 Points (home: 3–0–0; road: 3–0–0)
#	Date	Home	Score	Visitor	OT	Decision	Attendance	Record	Pts	Recap
11	11 November	Rødovre	2–3	Odense	OT	Pickard	2,892	8–3–0	20	Recap
12	14 November	Odense	6–2	Gentofte		Pickard	1,921	9–3–0	23	Recap
13	18 November	Herlev	2–4	Odense		Pickard	412	10–3–0	26	Recap
14	21 November	Odense	4–3	Aalborg		Pickard	2,218	11–3–0	29	Recap
15	26 November	Esbjerg	1–4	Odense		Pickard	888	12–3–0	32	Recap
16	28 November	Odense	3–2	Herning		Pickard	2,150	13–3–0	35	Recap

December: 5–2–0, 15 Points (home: 2–0–0; road: 3–2–0)
#	Date	Home	Score	Visitor	OT	Decision	Attendance	Record	Pts	Recap
17	5 December	Frederikshavn	4–2	Odense		Pickard	3,180	13–4–0	35	Recap
18	12 December	SønderjyskE	1–4	Odense		Pickard	3,011	14–4–0	38	Recap
19	14 December	Odense	6–1	Rødovre		Pickard	1,783	15–4–0	41	Recap
20	19 December	Gentofte	4–3	Odense		Pickard	266	15–5–0	41	Recap
21	27 December	Aalborg	1–2	Odense		Pickard	3,496	16–5–0	44	Recap
22	28 December	Odense	3–0	Herlev		Pickard	2,633	17–5–0	47	Recap
23	30 December	Rungsted	0–6	Odense		Pickard	1,560	18–5–0	50	Recap

January: 4–3–1, 12 Points (home: 4–1–0; road: 0–2–1)
#	Date	Home	Score	Visitor	OT	Decision	Attendance	Record	Pts	Recap
24	6 January	Odense	3–2	Esbjerg		Pickard	1,504	19–5–0	53	Recap
25	9 January	Odense	3–1	Rungsted		Pickard	2,153	20–5–0	56	Recap
26	13 January	Herning	3–2	Odense		Pickard	1,407	20–6–0	56	Recap
27	16 January	Odense	2–0	Frederikshavn		Pickard	2,327	21–6–0	59	Recap
28	23 January	Rødovre	2–1	Odense	OT	Pickard	1,964	21–6–1	60	Recap
29	27 January	Odense	5–4	Gentofte	SO	Pickard	1,537	22–6–1	62	Recap
30	30 January	Herlev	4–3	Odense		Pickard	347	22–7–1	62	Recap
31	31 January	Odense	1–4	SønderjyskE		Pickard	2,831	22–8–1	62	Recap

February: 1–4–0, 2 Points (home: 0–2–0; road: 1–2–0)
#	Date	Home	Score	Visitor	OT	Decision	Attendance	Record	Pts	Recap
32	10 February	Aalborg	5–6	Odense	SO	Pickard	998	23–8–1	64	Recap
33	13 February	Odense	2–4	Rungsted		Pickard	1,954	23–9–1	64	Recap
34	15 February	Esbjerg	5–4	Odense		Pickard	1,073	23–10–1	64	Recap
35	20 February	Odense	2–5	Herning		Pickard	2,793	23–11–1	64	Recap
36	24 February	Frederikshavn	6–4	Odense		Pickard	1,644	23–12–1	64	Recap

Legend: Win (3 points) Overtime/Shootout win (2 points) Loss (0 points) Overtime/Shootout loss (1 point)
