= 2015–16 Odense Bulldogs season =

2015–16 Odense Bulldogs
- 2015–16 record: 24–18–3

Team information
- Coach: Brad Gratton
- Assistant coach: Mads True
- Captain: Joakim Nettelbladtt
- Alternate captains: Dale Mitchell; Michael Daugulis; Ryan McDonough; Søren B. Pedersen
- Arena: Bryggeriet Vestfyens Arena
- Average attendance: 3,280

Team leaders
- Goals: Dale Mitchell (34)
- Assists: Dale Mitchell (43)
- Points: Dale Mitchell (77)
- Penalty minutes: Dale Mitchell (236)
- Goals against average: Tadeas Galansky (3.35)

The 2015–16 Odense Bulldogs season is the 25th season in the Danish Hockey League since the team was promoted in 1990.

They finished in 5th place in the league with the record 24–18–3 and were picked by 4th-placed Herning Blue Fox for the quarter-finals.

== Regular season ==
=== League table ===
	Club	GP	W	OTW	OTL	L	GF	GA	Pts
1.	SønderjyskE Ishockey	45	25	7	4	9	147	89	93
2.	Frederikshavn White Hawks	45	26	4	6	9	186	119	92
3.	Esbjerg Energy	45	22	7	2	14	148	104	82
4.	Herning Blue Fox	45	21	4	5	15	127	100	76
5.	Odense Bulldogs	45	22	2	3	18	191	154	73
6.	Rungsted Seier Capital	45	20	2	4	19	121	133	68
7.	Rødovre Mighty Bulls	45	16	6	4	19	132	125	64
8.	Aalborg Pirates	45	14	3	4	24	129	174	52
9.	Gentofte Stars	45	13	2	4	26	103	166	47
10.	Herlev Eagles	45	8	1	2	34	85	206	28

Updated to match(es) played on 29 February 2016. Source: Metal Ligaen

== Schedule and results ==
=== Regular season ===
2015–16 Game Log: 24–18–3, 73 Points (home: 11–7–3; road: 11–10–0)

September: 3–1–0, 9 Points (home: 2–0–0; road: 1–1–0)
#	Date	Home	Score	Visitor	OT	Decision	Attendance	Record	Pts
1	18 September	Odense	7–2	Rungsted		Galansky	1,448	1–0–0	3	Recap
2	21 September	Gentofte	3–5	Odense		Galansky	225	2–0–0	6	Recap
3	25 September	Odense	5–2	Aalborg		Galansky	1,378	3–0–0	9	Recap
4	29 September	Herning	4–1	Odense		Galansky	1,106	3–1–0	9	Recap

October: 3–4–2, 11 Points (home: 1–2–2; road: 2–2–0)
#	Date	Home	Score	Visitor	OT	Decision	Attendance	Record	Pts	Recap
5	1 October	Odense	3–6	Frederikshavn		Galansky	806	3–2–0	9	Recap
6	5 October	Rødovre	2–6	Odense		Galansky	1,368	4–2–0	12	Recap
7	9 October	Esbjerg	7–4	Odense		Galansky	1,258	4–3–0	12	Recap
8	12 October	Odense	2–4	SønderjyskE		Galansky	1,519	4–4–0	12	Recap
9	16 October	Herlev	3–5	Odense		Galansky	547	5–4–0	15	Recap
10	20 October	Odense	9–1	Herlev		Galansky	786	6–4–0	18	Recap
11	23 October	SønderjyskE	5–3	Odense		Galansky	3,012	6–5–0	18	Recap
12	26 October	Odense	3–4	Esbjerg	OT	Galansky	704	6–5–1	19	Recap
13	30 October	Odense	4–5	Rødovre	OT	Galansky	1,513	6–5–2	20	Recap

November: 5–3–0, 14 Points (home: 4–1–0; road: 1–2–0)
#	Date	Home	Score	Visitor	OT	Decision	Attendance	Record	Pts	Recap
14	1 November	Herlev	6–5	Odense		Galansky	428	6–6–2	20	Recap
15	13 November	Odense	2–5	Herning		Galansky	1,752	6–7–2	20	Recap
16	16 November	Aalborg	4–5	Odense		Galansky	982	7–7–2	23	Recap
17	20 November	Odense	7–2	Gentofte		Galansky	1,104	8–7–2	26	Recap
18	23 November	Odense	5–4	Rungsted	SO	Galansky	678	9–7–2	28	Recap
19	27 November	Rungsted	2–1	Odense		Galansky	679	9–8–2	28	Recap
20	29 November	Odense	4–1	Gentofte		Galansky	824	10–8–2	31	Recap
21	30 November	Odense	9–2	Gentofte		Galansky	702	11–8–2	34	Recap

December: 4–3–1, 12 Points (home: 0–2–1; road: 4–1–0)
#	Date	Home	Score	Visitor	OT	Decision	Attendance	Record	Pts	Recap
22	4 December	Herning	2–3	Odense	SO	Galansky	1,134	12–8–2	36	Recap
23	11 December	Rødovre	2–3	Odense		Galansky	1,211	13–8–2	39	Recap
24	13 December	Odense	2–4	Herlev		Galansky	924	13–9–2	39	Recap
25	15 December	Esbjerg	9–0	Odense		Galansky	1,207	13–10–2	39	Recap
26	18 December	Odense	2–3	SønderjyskE	OT	Galansky	1,374	13–10–3	40	Recap
27	22 December	SønderjyskE	2–4	Odense		Galansky	2,812	14–10–3	43	Recap
28	29 December	Frederikshavn	4–6	Odense		Galansky	1,807	15–10–3	46	Recap
29	30 December	Odense	2–4	Frederikshavn		Galansky	1,586	15–11–3	46	Recap

January: 4–3–0, 12 Points (home: 3–1–0; road: 1–3–0)
#	Date	Home	Score	Visitor	OT	Decision	Attendance	Record	Pts	Recap
30	5 January	Odense	9–3	Esbjerg		Galansky	803	16–10–3	49	Recap
31	12 January	Odense	3–2	Rødovre		Galansky	1,088	17–10–3	52	Recap
32	15 January	Frederikshavn	6–2	Odense		Lauridsen	1,533	17–11–3	52	Recap
33	19 January	Odense	4–9	Herning		Galansky	1,045	17–12–3	52	Recap
34	22 January	Aalborg	3–2	Odense		Galansky	3,820	17–14–3	52	Recap
35	26 January	Gentofte	2–1	Odense		Galansky	108	17–15–3	52	Recap
36	29 January	Rungsted	2–5	Odense		Galansky	707	17–16–3	55	Recap
37	31 January	Odense	6–1	Rungsted		Galansky	990	18–16–3	58	Recap

February: 5–3–0, 15 Points (home: 1–2–0; road: 4–1–0)
#	Date	Home	Score	Visitor	OT	Decision	Attendance	Record	Pts	Recap
38	2 February	Gentofte	6–3	Odense		Galansky	250	19–16–3	58	Recap
39	5 February	Odense	13–0	Aalborg		Galansky	1,710	20–16–3	61	Recap
40	16 February	Herning	1–5	Odense		Galansky	1,354	21–16–3	64	Recap
41	19 February	Odense	2–6	Frederikshavn		Galansky	1,946	21–17–3	64	Recap
42	21 February	Rødovre	2–4	Odense		Galansky	905	22–17–3	67	Recap
43	23 February	Esbjerg	0–1	Odense		Galansky	1,402	23–17–3	70	Recap
44	26 February	Odense	3–6	SønderjyskE		Galansky	2,873	23–18–3	70	Recap
45	29 February	Herlev	1–11	Odense		Galansky	188	24–18–3	73	Recap

Legend: Win (3 points) Overtime/Shootout win (2 points) Loss (0 points) Overtime/Shootout loss (1 point)

=== Playoffs ===
2016 Metal Ligaen Play-offs

Quarter-final vs. Herning Blue Fox (4): Herning won 4–3
#	Date	Visitor	Score	Home	OT	Decision	Attendance	Series	Recap
1	March 4	Herning	2–1	Odense		Galansky	3,139	0–1	Recap
2	March 6	Odense	3–0	Herning		Galansky	1,131	1–1	Recap
3	March 8	Herning	6–1	Odense		Galansky	1,503	1–2	Recap
4	March 11	Odense	2–1	Herning		Galansky	1,949	2–2	Recap
5	March 13	Herning	1–2	Odense	OT	Galansky	1,489	3–2	Recap
6	March 15	Odense	1–2	Herning		Galansky	1,853	3–3	Recap
7	March 18	Herning	2–1	Odense	OT	Galansky	3,259	3–4	Recap

Legend: Win (3 points) Overtime/Shootout win (2 points) Loss (0 points) Overtime/Shootout loss (1 point)

== Player statistics ==
=== Skaters ===
Regular season
Player	GP	G	A	Pts	+/−	PIM
Dale Mitchell	45	34	43	77	21	236
Ryan McDonough	45	27	33	60	11	34
Sean Wiles	42	31	22	53	1	32
Joakim Nettelbladt	45	10	43	53	19	59
John Armstrong	31	15	35	50	19	20
Rasmus Bjerrum	45	15	23	38	18	66
Simon Grønvaldt	38	4	30	34	25	22
Mathias Thinnesen	45	10	16	26	1	28
Mike Daugulis	45	14	10	24	3	54
Henry Hardarson	44	9	13	22	6	83
Martin Larsen	44	5	14	19	13	59
Søren Pedersen	45	8	8	16	−3	14
Rasmus Lyø	45	0	13	13	1	28
Andreas Pedersen	45	2	9	11	3	69
Mads Schaarup	45	0	8	8	4	14
Frederik Sørensen	42	4	3	7	4	70
Oliver Larsen	35	1	3	4	−5	45
Jonas Renè Hansen	27	1	1	2	2	2
Frederik Høeg	40	1	1	2	2	20
Asger Petersen	26	0	1	1	4	0

=== Goaltenders ===
Regular season
Player	GP	GAA	SV%
Tadeas Galansky	44	3.35	.989
Andreas Lauridsen	2	3.11	.844
