= Kirill Kabanov =

Russian ice hockey player

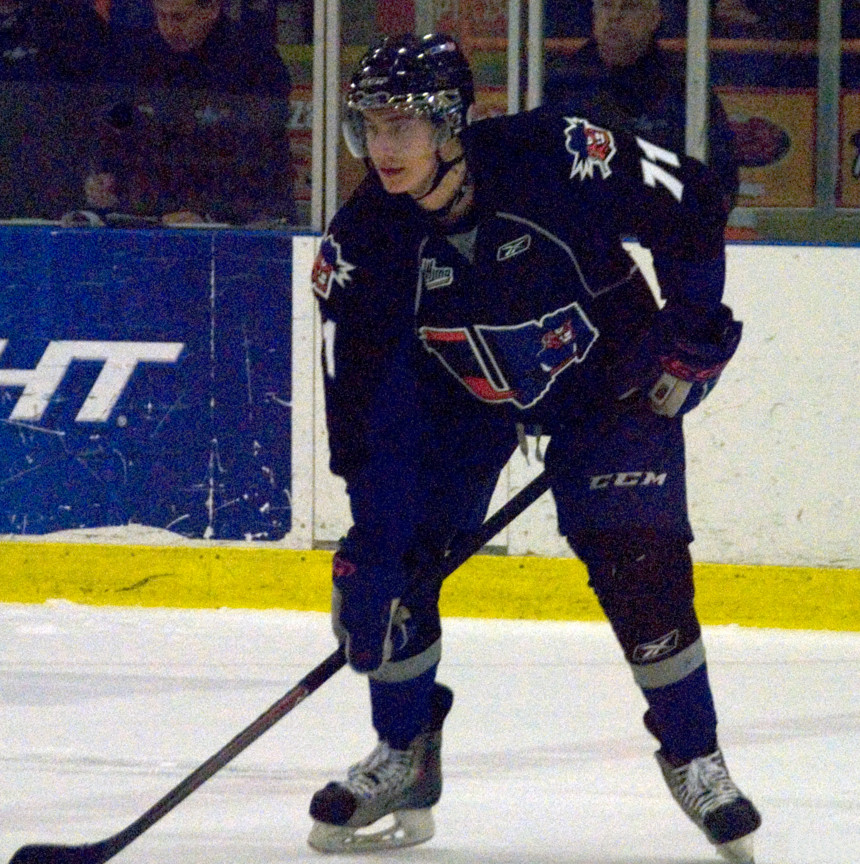
- Kabanov with the Lewiston Maineiacs in 2011
- Born: July 16, 1992 (age 34) Moscow, Russia
- Height: 6 ft 3 in (191 cm)
- Weight: 194 lb (88 kg; 13 st 12 lb)
- Position: Left wing
- Shoots: Right
- Metal team Former teams: Aalborg Pirates; HC Spartak Moscow; Bridgeport Sound Tigers; Modo Hockey; Skellefteå AIK; Salavat Yulaev Ufa; HC Neftekhimik Nizhnekamsk; Krefeld Pinguine
- NHL draft: 65th overall, 2010; New York Islanders
- Playing career: 2008–present

Kirill Sergeyevich Kabanov (Russian: Кирилл Сергеевич Кабанов; born July 16, 1992) is a Russian professional ice hockey forward, who is currently playing for the Aalborg Pirates in the Metal Ligaen (DEN). He played ten games with HC Spartak Moscow of the Kontinental Hockey League (KHL) before moving to North America. Kabanov also played for the Russian junior team at the 2009 IIHF World U18 Championships where he won a silver medal. Kabanov was selected 65th overall by the New York Islanders in the 2010 NHL entry draft.

== Playing career ==
In 2007, 15-year-old Kabanov was signed to a five-year contract with HC Spartak Moscow, a deal negotiated by his father and included an escape clause that would allow him to leave the contract to play in the National Hockey League (NHL). When the Russian Super League was disbanded in favour of the Kontinental Hockey League (KHL) in 2008, he signed a new four-year contract to replace the original deal that also had an NHL escape clause. He joined Spartak in 2008–09 as the youngest player in the KHL and appeared in ten regular season and playoff games. During the season, the KHL unilaterally revoked his NHL escape clause. His playing rights were sold to Salavat Yulaev Ufa, which required a new contract be signed under KHL rules. Ufa refused to grant him another escape clause, and Kabanov refused to sign a new contract. In the meantime, he was selected by the Moncton Wildcats of the Quebec Major Junior Hockey League (QMJHL) with the seventh overall selection in the Canadian Hockey League Import Draft.

Faced with an ultimatum by Ufa to sign a contract or risk being disqualified from playing hockey in Russia for three years, Kabanov instead flew to Moncton and petitioned the International Ice Hockey Federation (IIHF) to allow him to play in Canada. He expressed a strong desire to play junior hockey, stating that it didn't matter how much money he was offered in the KHL. He missed the first ten games of the 2009–10 QMJHL season while the Moncton and Ufa battled over his rights before the IIHF ruled in favour of the Wildcats, allowing Kabanov to join his new team. At one point considered a potential first overall selection for the 2010 NHL entry draft, Eventually Kabanov would be selected 65th overall by the New York Islanders in the 2010 NHL Entry Draft.

Internationally, Kabanov played with the Russian junior team at the 2009 IIHF World U18 Championships. He finished eighth in tournament scoring with eleven points, and helped the Russians win a silver medal. He was unable to participate in the 2010 World Junior Ice Hockey Championships due to a wrist injury. The injury required surgery, leaving Kabanov out of the Moncton lineup until February 2010. Late in the season, Kabanov would become a regular healthy scratch and fall out of favor with the Wildcats. Being a scratch for the entire first round of the playoffs, Moncton released Kabanov of his obligations, allowing him to play in the 2010 U18 tournament. There, he would become the center of controversy after being rejected by the Russian squad for disciplinary reasons. "I removed him from the team because [although] we thought [he] would help us, but he brought only confusion to the team," Vasiliev told Sovietsky Sport. "Kabanov came and thought 'Here I am, a star from Canada, who will save all.' But it's the team that wins rather than an individual player."

On June 6, 2010 agent JP Barry parted ways with Kabanov, stating "it just wasn't a fit." Ilya Moliver, one of the previous Kabanov's agents, says that the main problem with Kabanov is his father, who is "hard to find common language with." On October 28, 2010, Kabanov was traded from the Wildcats to the Lewiston Maineiacs.

On July 1, 2011, Kabanov signed a three-year entry-level contract with the New York Islanders of the National Hockey League (NHL) and participated in the team's training camp. However, he was soon assigned to Quebec Major Junior Hockey League (QMJHL) affiliate Blainville-Boisbriand Armada before the start of the season. Having played no games with the Islanders nor Armada, Kabanov was loaned to the Swedish Elitserien (SEL) team Färjestads BK early in the season, on October 13, 2011. However, a day later he was traded to the Shawinigan Cataractes, and on October 15 it was confirmed that he would stay in North America for the 2011–12 season.

After a successful 2011–12 campaign in which he scored 21 goals and notched 34 assists (both personal records), Kabanov made the jump up to the professional American Hockey League (AHL) for the 2012–13 season. with Islanders affiliate, the Bridgeport Sound Tigers. In his second year of his entry-level deal, unable to solidify a position within the Sound Tigers, he was reassigned to ECHL affiliate, the Stockton Thunder. He was then loaned to Modo Hockey in the Swedish Hockey League for the remainder of the season.

On July 15, 2014, Kabanov was placed on conditional waivers in order to mutually terminate the final year of his contract with the Islanders. On July 30, 2014, Kabanov opted to continue his career in the SHL, declining Modo interest to sign with League champions Skellefteå AIK on a one-year contract.

After two season in the Swedish League, Kabanov returned to North America as a free agent, accepting a try-out offer to attend the New York Rangers training camp on September 17, 2015. He was released from his try-out on September 24, 2015. Kabanov returned to the KHL for limited action hampered by injury through two years before spending the 2017–18 season in Denmark with the Aalborg Pirates of the Metal Ligaen.

As a free agent, Kabanov continued his career in Europe by signing as a free agent to a one-year contract with German club, Krefeld Pinguine of the Deutsche Eishockey Liga, on June 15, 2018. In the 2018–19 season, Kabanov as a regular top nine forward, contributed with 3 goals and 19 points in 49 games.

== Career statistics ==
=== Regular season and playoffs ===
			Regular season					Playoffs
Season	Team	League	GP	G	A	Pts	PIM	GP	G	A	Pts	PIM
2007–08	Spartak-2 Moscow	RUS-3	19	0	1	1	10	—	—	—	—	—
2008–09	Spartak Moscow	KHL	6	0	0	0	2	4	0	0	0	0
2009–10	Moncton Wildcats	QMJHL	22	10	13	23	34	1	0	0	0	2
2010–11	Moncton Wildcats	QMJHL	2	0	0	0	6	0	0	0	0	0
2010–11	Lewiston Maineiacs	QMJHL	37	11	17	28	38	15	8	12	20	18
2011–12	Shawinigan Cataractes	QMJHL	50	21	34	55	42	11	4	9	13	12
2012–13	Bridgeport Sound Tigers	AHL	32	2	7	9	27	—	—	—	—	—
2013–14	Bridgeport Sound Tigers	AHL	16	3	0	3	12	—	—	—	—	—
2013–14	Stockton Thunder	ECHL	9	4	4	8	11	—	—	—	—	—
2013–14	Modo Hockey	SHL	12	6	2	8	2	2	0	1	1	4
2014–15	Skellefteå AIK	SHL	43	11	18	29	20	13	3	3	6	4
2015–16	Salavat Yulaev Ufa	KHL	8	0	0	0	14	1	0	0	0	0
2016–17	HC Neftekhimik Nizhnekamsk	KHL	5	0	0	0	2	—	—	—	—	—
2017–18	Aalborg Pirates	DEN	42	19	14	33	71	17	4	8	12	10
2018–19	Krefeld Pinguine	DEL	49	3	16	19	28	—	—	—	—	—
2019–20	Aalborg Pirates	DEN	47	12	22	34	51	—	—	—	—	—
2020–21	Aalborg Pirates	DEN	44	19	32	51	28	16	3	12	15	10
2021–22	Aalborg Pirates	DEN	31	17	11	28	33	13	3	6	9	6
2022–23	Aalborg Pirates	DEN	48	10	31	41	30	16	5	4	9	10
2023–24	Aalborg Pirates	DEN	37	10	15	25	14	14	4	6	10	6
2024–25	Aalborg Pirates	DEN	37	6	9	15	24	12	3	4	7	6
KHL totals			19	0	0	0	18	5	0	0	0	0
AHL totals			48	5	7	12	39	—	—	—	—	—

Medal record

Representing Russia

Ice hockey

IIHF World U18 Championship
Silver medal – second place	2009 Russia	

=== International ===
Year	Team	Event	Result	GP	G	A	Pts	PIM
2008	Russia	U17	5th	5	2	9	11	28
2009	Russia	U18	2nd place, silver medalist(s)	7	4	7	11	18
Junior totals				12	6	16	22	46
