= 2024–25 Metal Ligaen season =

2024–25 Metal Ligaen
- League: Metal Ligaen
- Sport: Ice hockey
- Duration: 1 September 2024 – 25 April 2025
- Teams: 9

Regular season

Playoffs

Finals
- Champions: Odense Bulldogs
- Runners-up: Herning Blue Fox

Metal Ligaen seasons
- 2023–24 2025–26

The 2024–25 Metal Ligaen season was the 68th season of the Metal Ligaen, the top level of ice hockey in Denmark.

== Teams ==
Teams of the 2024–25 Metal Ligaen season

The league consists of 9 teams.

Team	Arena	Capacity
Aalborg Pirates	Gigantium Isarena	5,000
Esbjerg Energy	Granly Hockey Arena	4,200
Frederikshavn White Hawks	Scanel Hockey Arena	4,000
Herlev Eagles	Martinsen Arena	1,740
Herning Blue Fox	KVIK Hockey Arena	4,105
Odense Bulldogs	Odense Isstadion	3,280
Rungsted Seier Capital	Saxo Bank Arena	2,460
Rødovre Mighty Bulls	Rødovre Skøjte Arena	3,600
SønderjyskE Ishockey	SE Arena	5,000

== Regular season ==
Each team played 48 games, playing each of the other eight teams six times: thrice on home ice, and thrice away from home. Points are awarded for each game, where three points are awarded for winning in regulation time, two points for winning in overtime or shootout, one point for losing in overtime or shootout, and zero points for losing in regulation time. At the end of the regular season, the team that finishes with the most points is crowned the league champion.

The Herning Blue Fox finished top of the regular season, qualified for the 2025–26 IIHF Continental Cup.

=== Standings ===
Pos	Team	Pld	W	OTW	OTL	L	GF	GA	GD	Pts	Qualification
1	Herning Blue Fox	48	30	4	5	9	201	105	+96	103	Qualification to play-offs
2	Odense Bulldogs	48	24	7	4	13	168	131	+37	90	Qualification to play-offs
3	Rungsted Seier Capital	48	24	2	5	17	152	155	−3	81	Qualification to play-offs
4	Aalborg Pirates	48	22	4	3	19	163	135	+28	77	Qualification to play-offs
5	Esbjerg Energy	48	16	11	5	16	148	135	+13	75	Qualification to play-offs
6	Frederikshavn White Hawks	48	19	5	4	20	133	144	−11	71	Qualification to play-offs
7	SønderjyskE	48	17	4	10	17	164	159	+5	69	Qualification to play-offs
8	Herlev Eagles	48	16	5	4	23	137	144	−7	62	Qualification to play-offs
9	Rødovre Mighty Bulls	48	4	2	4	38	93	251	−158	20	

Source: Metal Ligaen

=== Statistics ===
==== Scoring leaders ====
The following shows the top players who led the league in points, at the conclusion of regular season.

Player	Team	GP	G	A	Pts	+/–	PIM
(Denmark) Mathias Bau Hansen	Herning Blue Fox	45	33	37	70	+30	28
(Canada) Darien Craighead	Aalborg Pirates	44	27	41	68	+15	75
(Denmark) Morten Poulsen	Herning Blue Fox	48	34	31	65	+42	12
(Canada) Troy Lajeunesse	Aalborg Pirates	46	26	31	57	-2	44
(United States) Eric Gotz	Aalborg Pirates	48	10	46	56	+13	14
(United States) Brandon Estes	Odense Bulldogs	48	14	38	52	-2	39
(Sweden) Joakim Thelin	Odense Bulldogs	48	23	28	51	+12	45
(Canada) Maxime Trepanier	Herlev Eagles	43	25	25	50	+9	26
(Sweden) Theo Keilin	Rungsted Seier Capital	45	16	32	48	+28	14
(Canada) Derian Plouffe	Herning Blue Fox	39	17	31	48	+35	10

==== Leading goaltenders ====
The following shows the top goaltenders who led the league in goals against average, provided that they have played at least 40% of their team's minutes, at the conclusion of the regular season.

Player	Team	GP	TOI	GA	Sv%	GAA
(Denmark) Mathias Seldrup	Herning Blue Fox	35	2103:00	73	90.32	2.08
(Denmark) Nicolaj Henriksen	Esbjerg Energy	25	1524:23	56	92.18	2.20
(Sweden) Niklas Lundström	Odense Bulldogs	22	1312:16	50	91.87	2.29
(Czech Republic) Tadeas Galansky	Frederikshavn White Hawks	39	2308:00	97	91.35	2.52
(Sweden) Emil Zetterquist	Herlev Eagles	41	2421:12	102	91.40	2.53
(Denmark) Georg Sørensen	Aalborg Pirates	43	2522:26	115	89.10	2.74
(Denmark) David Grubak	Rungsted Seier Capital	35	2021:05	93	91.14	2.76

== Playoffs ==
Eight teams qualify for the playoffs. The Odense Bulldogs defeated the Herning Blue Fox in the Finals to qualify for the 2025–26 Champions Hockey League.

=== Bracket ===
Quarter-finals (best-of-7)
1	Herning Blue Fox	4
8	Herlev Eagles	0
4	Aalborg Pirates	4
5	Esbjerg Energy	0
2	Odense Bulldogs	4
7	SønderjyskE Ishockey	3
3	Rungsted Seier Capital	4
6	Frederikshavn White Hawks	1

Metal4 (best-of-7)
1	Herning Blue Fox	4
4	Aalborg Pirates	2
2	Odense Bulldogs	4
3	Rungsted Seier Capital	1

Finals (best-of-7)
1	Herning Blue Fox	1
2	Odense Bulldogs	4

=== Quarter-finals ===
Herning Blue Fox – Herlev Eagles 4–0
14.3.2025	Herning Blue Fox	Herlev Eagles	9-2
16.3.2025	Herlev Eagles	Herning Blue Fox	0-5
18.3.2025	Herning Blue Fox	Herlev Eagles	6-0
21.3.2025	Herlev Eagles	Herning Blue Fox	1-2 OT
Herning won the series 4–0.

Odense Bulldogs – SønderjyskE Ishockey 4–3
14.3.2025	Odense Bulldogs	SønderjyskE Ishockey	7-5
16.3.2025	SønderjyskE Ishockey	Odense Bulldogs	5-4 OT
18.3.2025	Odense Bulldogs	SønderjyskE Ishockey	2-4
21.3.2025	SønderjyskE Ishockey	Odense Bulldogs	1-3
23.3.2025	Odense Bulldogs	SønderjyskE Ishockey	3-0
25.3.2025	SønderjyskE Ishockey	Odense Bulldogs	1-0
28.3.2025	Odense Bulldogs	SønderjyskE Ishockey	5-2
Odense won the series 4–3.

Rungsted Seier Capital – Frederikshavn White Hawks 4–1
14.3.2025	Rungsted Seier Capital	Frederikshavn White Hawks	3-0
16.3.2025	Frederikshavn White Hawks	Rungsted Seier Capital	2-5
18.3.2025	Rungsted Seier Capital	Frederikshavn White Hawks	4-1
21.3.2025	Frederikshavn White Hawks	Rungsted Seier Capital	5-2
23.3.2025	Rungsted Seier Capital	Frederikshavn White Hawks	2-1 OT
Rungsted won the series 4–1.

Aalborg Pirates – Esbjerg Energy 4–0
14.3.2025	Aalborg Pirates	Esbjerg Energy	6-1
16.3.2025	Esbjerg Energy	Aalborg Pirates	2-4
18.3.2025	Aalborg Pirates	Esbjerg Energy	3-2 OT
21.3.2025	Esbjerg Energy	Aalborg Pirates	0-5
Aalborg won the series 4–0.

=== Metal4 ===
Herning Blue Fox – Aalborg Pirates 4–2
1.4.2025	Herning Blue Fox	Aalborg Pirates	4-0
4.4.2025	Aalborg Pirates	Herning Blue Fox	2-6
6.4.2025	Herning Blue Fox	Aalborg Pirates	3-4
8.4.2025	Aalborg Pirates	Herning Blue Fox	2-4
11.4.2025	Herning Blue Fox	Aalborg Pirates	3-4 OT
13.4.2025	Aalborg Pirates	Herning Blue Fox	3-4
Herning won the series 4–2.

Odense Bulldogs – Rungsted Seier Capital 4–1
1.4.2025	Odense Bulldogs	Rungsted Seier Capital	3-7
4.4.2025	Rungsted Seier Capital	Odense Bulldogs	1-4
6.4.2025	Odense Bulldogs	Rungsted Seier Capital	3-1
8.4.2025	Rungsted Seier Capital	Odense Bulldogs	5-6 OT
11.4.2025	Odense Bulldogs	Rungsted Seier Capital	4-1
Odense won the series 4–1.

=== Finals ===
==== (1) Herning Blue Fox vs. (2) Odense Bulldogs ====
18 April 2025	Herning Blue Fox	5–6	Odense Bulldogs	KVIK Hockey Arena	Recap
Mathias Bau Hansen – pp – 13:58		First period	3:55 – Joakim Thelin; 12:43 – Radim Piroutek
Hjalte Thomsen – 5:57; Hjalte Thomsen – 15:49		Second period	0:12 – Daniel Baastrup-Andersen; 6:37 – Filips Buncis; 9:14 – Brandon Estes
Brett Thompson – pp – 0:36; Oskars Cibuļskis – 15:43		Third period	6:13 – Joakim Thelin
Mathias Seldrup (29 shots / 23 saves)		Goalie stats	Niklas Lundström (35 shots / 30 saves)

20 April 2025	Odense Bulldogs	2–4	Herning Blue Fox	Odense Isstadion	Recap
No scoring		First period	1:51 – Brett Thompson; 15:17 – Petter Hansson
Daniel Baastrup-Andersen – 0:42; Martin Larsen – 3:49		Second period	No scoring
No scoring		Third period	17:46 – Mathias Bau Hansen; 18:46 – Martin Eskildsen
Niklas Lundström (20 shots / 16 saves)		Goalie stats	Mathias Seldrup (31 shots / 29 saves)

22 April 2025	Herning Blue Fox	2–4	Odense Bulldogs	KVIK Hockey Arena	Recap
Frederik Braendgaard – 2:13		First period	6:18 – Kristian Jensen; 14:18 – Daniel Baastrup-Andersen
No scoring		Second period	6:11 – Joakim Thelin
Brett Thompson – 12:11		Third period	11:09 – Radim Piroutek
Mathias Seldrup (28 shots / 24 saves)		Goalie stats	Niklas Lundström (32 shots / 30 saves)

23 April 2025	Odense Bulldogs	3–1	Herning Blue Fox	Odense Isstadion	Recap
Brandon Estes – 3:49; Markus Oden – 12:00		First period	No scoring
Magnus Boesen – 4:27		Second period	0:12 – Hjalte Thomsen
No scoring		Third period	No scoring
Niklas Lundström (35 shots / 34 saves)		Goalie stats	Janis Fecers (34 shots / 31 saves)

25 April 2025	Herning Blue Fox	1–2	OT	Odense Bulldogs	KVIK Hockey Arena	Recap
No scoring		First period		1:15 – Radim Piroutek
Maksim Popovic – 17:14		Second period		No scoring
No scoring		Third period		No scoring
No scoring		Overtime		2:34 – Markus Jensen
Mathias Seldrup (22 shots / 20 saves)		Goalie stats		Niklas Lundström (30 shots / 29 saves)

Odense won the series 4–1

=== Statistics ===
==== Scoring leaders ====
The following shows the top players who led the league in points, at the conclusion of the playoffs.

Player	Team	GP	G	A	Pts	+/–	PIM
(Denmark) Mathias Bau Hansen	Herning Blue Fox	12	7	16	23	+11	31
(United States) Brandon Estes	Odense Bulldogs	14	6	12	18	+6	29
(Canada) Derian Plouffe	Herning Blue Fox	12	4	12	16	+12	2
(Denmark) Morten Poulsen	Herning Blue Fox	12	8	7	15	+9	2
(Denmark) Emil Kristensen	Herning Blue Fox	12	3	12	15	+14	2
(Sweden) Joakim Thelin	Odense Bulldogs	14	9	5	14	+7	2
(Denmark) Victor Cubars	Herning Blue Fox	12	5	8	13	+4	36
(Denmark) Kristian Jensen	Odense Bulldogs	14	3	10	13	+4	31

==== Leading goaltenders ====
The following shows the top goaltenders who led the league in goals against average, provided that they have played at least 40% of their team's minutes, at the conclusion of the playoffs.

Player	Team	GP	TOI	GA	Sv%	GAA
(Sweden) Niklas Lundström	Odense Bulldogs	14	847:27	40	89.90	2.83
(Denmark) David Grubak	Rungsted Seier Capital	11	632:00	28	92.29	2.66
(Denmark) Georg Sørensen	Aalborg Pirates	11	658:26	28	91.41	2.55
(Denmark) Mathias Seldrup	Herning Blue Fox	12	742:04	26	91.72	2.10
