= Hannu Toivonen =

Finnish ice hockey player (born 1984)

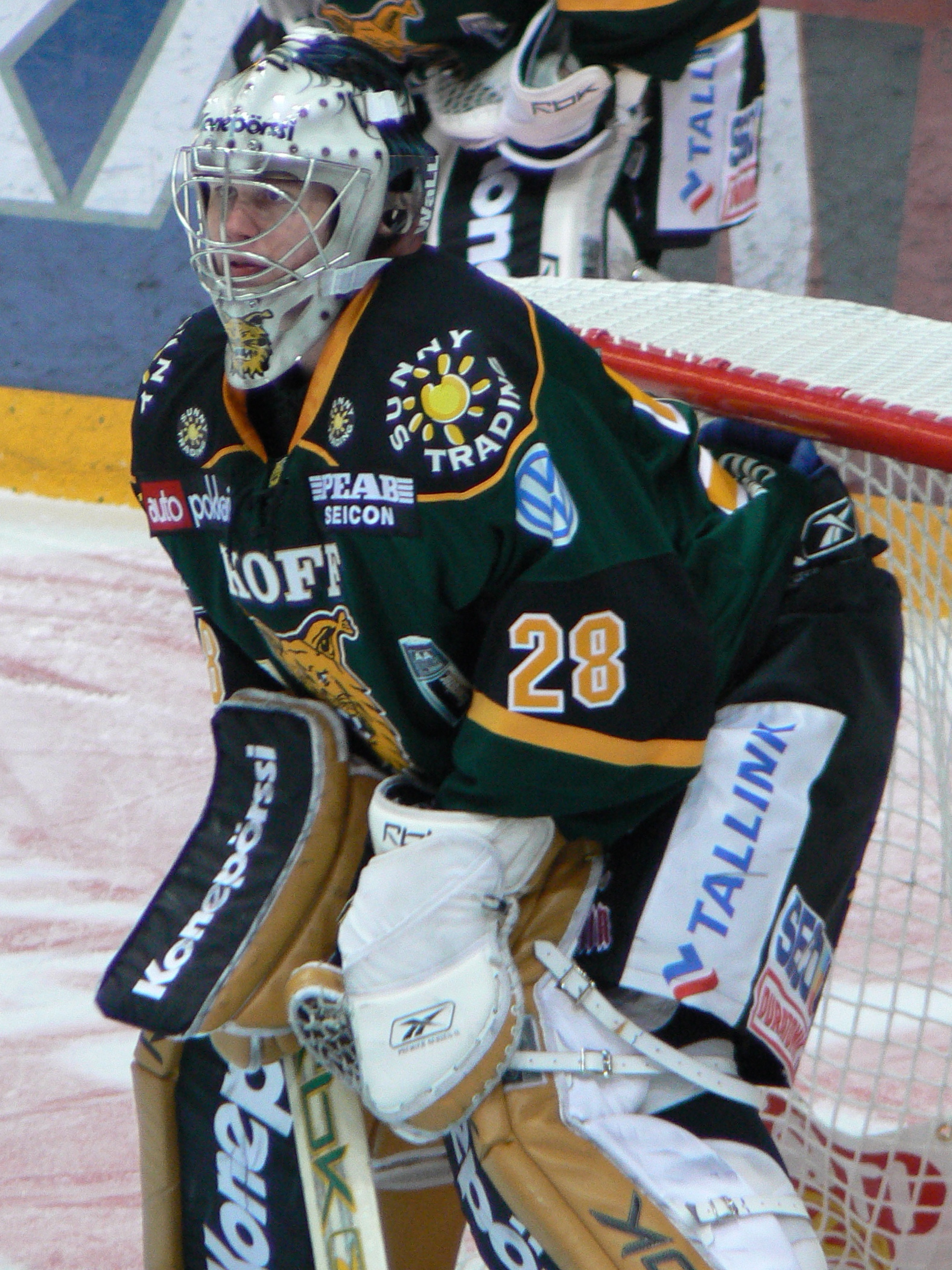
- Born: 18 May 1984 (age 42) Kalvola, Finland
- Height: 6 ft 2 in (188 cm)
- Weight: 197 lb (89 kg; 14 st 1 lb)
- Position: Goaltender
- Caught: Left
- Played for: HPK; Boston Bruins; St. Louis Blues; Ilves; Malmö Redhawks; SaiPa; Vaasan Sport; Graz 99ers Odense Bulldogs; HIFK
- NHL draft: 29th overall, 2002; Boston Bruins
- Playing career: 2002–2019

Hannu Pekka Toivonen (Finnish pronunciation: [ˈhɑnːu ˈtoi̯ʋonen]; born 18 May 1984) is a Finnish former professional ice hockey goaltender. He is the current goaltending coach for the Toronto Marlies. He played with the Boston Bruins and the St. Louis Blues in the National Hockey League (NHL), the former of which drafted him 29th overall in the 2002 NHL entry draft. Toivonen also spent several years with the Tampereen Ilves of the Liiga in his home country.

Although Toivonen was widely considered to be a top goaltending prospect, he was injured in 2005–06 and never regained the form that made him a first-round selection in 2002.

== Playing career ==
=== Professional ===
Toivonen started his pro career with HPK in the Finnish SM-liiga. He was drafted by the Boston Bruins of the National Hockey League (NHL) in the 2002 NHL entry draft, and moved to the Providence Bruins of the American Hockey League (AHL) in 2003.

With Andrew Raycroft sitting out due to a contract dispute, Toivonen started the 2005–06 NHL season as the Bruins' backup goaltender. He made his NHL debut on 8 October 2005 against the Pittsburgh Penguins, coming away with an overtime win. He holds the distinction of allowing the first goal of Sidney Crosby's career in that game. On 1 December 2005, he recorded his first NHL shutout, blanking the Ottawa Senators. Toivonen was 9–5–4 with a 2.63 GAA and a .914 SV% before suffering a high ankle sprain in January that effectively ended his season.

At the beginning of the 2006–07 season, Toivonen and Tim Thomas were competing for the starter spot. After a rough start at the beginning of the season, Toivonen was sent down to Providence and was replaced by Brian Finley on 7 November 2006, officially making Thomas the starting goaltender for Boston. Over the course of the next couple months, he was repeatedly recalled to Boston and sent back down to Providence. On 2 April, he was recalled to Boston for the last two away games, then sent back to Providence on 6 April. On 26 April 2007, Toivonen signed a one-year contract extension with the Bruins.

On 23 July 2007, Toivonen was traded to the St. Louis Blues in exchange for Carl Söderberg. Upon being traded to the Blues, Toivonen was reunited with former Bruins teammates Brad Boyes, Ryan Glenn, Yan Stastny and Derek Gustafson. In the 2007–08 season, Toivonen played in 23 games with the Blues before he was assigned to the Peoria Rivermen, the Blues' AHL affiliate, on 11 February 2008.

Toivonen spent the 2008–09 season with Ilves in Finland, but re-signed with St. Louis on 9 June 2009. He was then assigned to the Blues' farm team in Peoria on 21 September 2009, for the beginning of the 2009–10 season. On 1 March 2010, Toivonen was traded from St. Louis to the Chicago Blackhawks, along with Danny Richmond, in exchange for goaltender Joe Fallon. All players involved in the trade remained with their respective AHL affiliates.

Toivonen signed a two-year contract with the Malmö Redhawks of the HockeyAllsvenskan on 1 July 2011. In the 2011–12 season he played in 19 games, averaging a .895 save percentage (SVS) and 3.30 goals against average (GAA). However, due to economical crisis in the Redhawks club, Toivonen was forced to leave the club after the 2011–12 season. His contract is being paid out by the Redhawks.

With the commencement of the 2013–14 season under-way, Toivonen joined the Toledo Walleye of the ECHL on 11 November 2013.

On 11 April 2014, Toivonen returned to Finland to sign a contract with newly promoted Liiga club, Vaasan Sport.

== Career statistics ==
=== Regular season and playoffs ===
			Regular season										Playoffs
Season	Team	League	GP	W	L	T	OTL	MIN	GA	SO	GAA	SV%	GP	W	L	MIN	GA	SO	GAA	SV%
2000–01	HPK	Jr. B	—	—	—	—	—	—	—	—	—	—	—	—	—	—	—	—	—	—
2001–02	HPK	Jr. B	5	4	1	0	—	277	14	0	3.03	—	—	—	—	—	—	—	—	—
2001–02	HPK	Jr. A	31	15	12	4	—	1878	103	2	3.29	.911	7	3	4	440	31	0	4.23	.903
2002–03	HPK	Jr. A	6	3	3	0	—	359	20	0	3.34	.919	—	—	—	—	—	—	—	—
2002–03	HPK	SM-l	24	16	2	4	—	1432	54	2	2.26	.911	2	1	1	117	3	1	1.53	.927
2003–04	Providence Bruins	AHL	36	15	16	4	—	2162	83	2	2.30	.921	—	—	—	—	—	—	—	—
2004–05	Providence Bruins	AHL	54	29	18	3	—	3017	103	7	2.05	.932	17	10	7	1038	42	0	2.43	.923
2005–06	Boston Bruins	NHL	20	9	5	—	4	1163	51	1	2.63	.914	—	—	—	—	—	—	—	—
2006–07	Providence Bruins	AHL	27	13	13	—	1	1618	64	2	2.37	.909	13	6	7	742	36	0	2.91	.897
2006–07	Boston Bruins	NHL	18	3	9	—	1	893	63	0	4.23	.875	—	—	—	—	—	—	—	—
2007–08	St. Louis Blues	NHL	23	6	10	—	5	1202	69	0	3.44	.878	—	—	—	—	—	—	—	—
2007–08	Peoria Rivermen	AHL	11	6	4	—	0	627	33	0	3.16	.883	—	—	—	—	—	—	—	—
2008–09	Ilves	SM-l	56	19	23	9	—	2913	130	3	2.68	.910	3	1	2	198	6	1	1.82	.939
2009–10	Peoria Rivermen	AHL	26	11	11	—	3	1516	69	0	2.73	.906	—	—	—	—	—	—	—	—
2009–10	Rockford IceHogs	AHL	5	1	4	—	0	296	17	0	3.44	.883	1	0	0	20	1	0	3.00	.800
2010–11	Rockford IceHogs	AHL	49	21	16	—	4	2463	119	3	2.90	.907	—	—	—	—	—	—	—	—
2011–12	Malmö Redhawks	Allsv	19	—	—	—	—	1054	58	1	3.30	.894	—	—	—	—	—	—	—	—
2012–13	Orlando Solar Bears	ECHL	11	2	7	—	0	565	37	0	3.93	.888	—	—	—	—	—	—	—	—
2012–13	SaiPa	SM-l	8	2	4	2	—	462	22	1	2.85	.900	—	—	—	—	—	—	—	—
2013–14	Toledo Walleye	ECHL	31	12	17	—	1	1826	103	1	3.38	.905	—	—	—	—	—	—	—	—
2013–14	Milwaukee Admirals	AHL	4	1	1	—	1	120	5	0	2.50	.909	—	—	—	—	—	—	—	—
2013–14	Iowa Wild	AHL	1	0	1	—	0	40	8	0	12.00	.680	—	—	—	—	—	—	—	—
2014–15	Sport	Liiga	45	13	23	6	—	2577	114	1	2.65	.918	—	—	—	—	—	—	—	—
2015–16	Ilves	Liiga	46	13	24	8	—	2600	106	4	2.45	.907	—	—	—	—	—	—	—	—
2016–17	Ilves	Liiga	32	8	16	7	—	1814	75	2	2.48	.913	—	—	—	—	—	—	—	—
2017–18	Graz 99ers	EBEL	32	—	—	—	—	1809	105	0	3.48	.902	—	—	—	—	—	—	—	—
2017–18	Odense Bulldogs	DNK	4	—	—	—	—	—	—	—	4.60	.848	3	—	—	—	—	—	3.75	.879
2018–19	HIFK	Liiga	1	0	0	0	—	1	0	0	0.00	—	—	—	—	—	—	—	—	—
2018–19	Maine Mariners	ECHL	9	5	3	—	0	506	28	0	3.32	.900	—	—	—	—	—	—	—	—
SM-l/Liiga totals			208	71	76	36	—	11,799	501	13	2.55	—	5	2	3	315	9	2	1.71	—
NHL totals			61	18	24	—	10	3258	183	1	3.37	.890	—	—	—	—	—	—	—	—

=== International ===
Year	Team	Event	GP	W	L	T	MIN	GA	SO	GAA	SV%
2002	Finland	WJC18	5				242	9	1	2.23	.930
2004	Finland	WJC	6	4	2	0	357	11	1	1.85	.920
Junior totals			11	—	—	—	599	20	2	2.00	—

Awards and achievements
Preceded by Shaone Morrisonn	Boston Bruins first-round draft pick 2002	Succeeded by Mark Stuart
