= 2022–23 Metal Ligaen season =

2022–23 Metal Ligaen
- League: Metal Ligaen
- Sport: Ice hockey
- Duration: 2 September 2022 – 7 March 2023
- Number of teams: 9

Regular season

Playoffs

Finals

Metal Ligaen seasons
- ← 2021–22 2023–24 →

The 2022–23 Metal Ligaen season was the 66th season of the Metal Ligaen, the top level of ice hockey in Denmark.

== Teams ==
Teams of the 2022–23 Metal Ligaen season

The same nine teams from the 2021–22 season returned.

Team	Arena	Capacity
Aalborg Pirates	Gigantium Isarena	5,000
Esbjerg Energy	Granly Hockey Arena	4,200
Frederikshavn White Hawks	Scanel Hockey Arena	4,000
Herlev Eagles	DFDS Seaways Arena	1,740
Herning Blue Fox	KVIK Hockey Arena	4,105
Odense Bulldogs	Odense Isstadion	3,280
Rungsted Seier Capital	Saxo Bank Arena	2,460
Rødovre Mighty Bulls	Rødovre Skøjte Arena	3,600
SønderjyskE Ishockey	SE Arena	5,000

== Regular season ==
Pos	Team	Pld	W	OTW	OTL	L	GF	GA	GD	Pts	Qualification
1	Herning Blue Fox	25	17	1	1	6	81	51	+30	54	Qualification to play-offs
2	SønderjyskE	25	15	3	1	6	89	71	+18	52	Qualification to play-offs
3	Aalborg Pirates	23	12	3	3	5	77	49	+28	45	Qualification to play-offs
4	Odense Bulldogs	24	11	4	1	8	82	57	+25	42	Qualification to play-offs
5	Rungsted Seier Capital	25	10	0	4	11	67	79	−12	34	Qualification to play-offs
6	Esbjerg Energy	23	9	0	5	9	61	57	+4	32	Qualification to play-offs
7	Frederikshavn White Hawks	24	7	3	1	13	47	69	−22	28	Qualification to play-offs
8	Herlev Eagles	23	6	3	1	13	63	83	−20	25	Qualification to play-offs
9	Rødovre Mighty Bulls	26	3	2	2	19	57	108	−51	15	

Updated to match(es) played on 5 December 2022. Source: Metal Ligaen

== Results ==
Home	Away								
Home	Aalborg	Esbjerg	Fr.havn	Herlev	Herning	Odense	Rungsted	Rødovre	Sønderj.
Aalborg Pirates	–	6–3	4–2	4–2; 7–2	1–3; 1–0	1–2 OT; 3–4 OT	5–1; 4–2	5–1; 2–3	7–0
Esbjerg Energy	2–3 OT; 0–1	–	1–2 OT; 4–1	2–3 GWS	4–0; 4–0	2–1	3–4; 2–4	3–2; 6–1	4–5 GWS
Frederikshavn White Hawks	2–4	2–1; 3–1	–	2–1; 4–3 OT	0–2	0–3; 3–5	3–1; 1–0	4–3; 5–2	0–4; 1–3
Herlev Eagles	2–1 GWS	6–1; 4–1	2–3	–	3–4; 4–5 GWS	1–4	4–3 OT; 0–2	2–3; 4–3	6–3; 1–7
Herning Blue Fox	2–0; 4–2	4–1	2–0; 6–2	6–2; 0–1	–	3–1	4–0	7–4; 5–0	4–1; 3–4 OT
Odense Bulldogs	1–4	0–3; 3–2; 5–6	5–0	6–3; 6–1; 4–3 GWS	2–3 OT; 3–5; 1–4	–	5–4 GWSS	7–1	5–1; 2–5
Rungsted Seier Capital	2–3 GWS	1–4	6–5; 7–2	2–4	4–2	4–1; 2–0	–	5–2; 3–4 GWS; 7–4	3–5; 6–3
Rødovre Mighty Bulls	2–5; 1–2 GWS	1–6; 2–1 OT	1–2 GWS	3–5	2–3	2–9; 3–6	6–3	–	2–5; 4–0; 4–3
SønderjyskE Ishockey	4–3; 5–2	2–1	4–3 GWS; 5–1	6–2	4–3; 5–2	2–3 OT	4–2; 3–1	5–2	–
OT - Overtime. GWS - Shootout.
