= Jacob Johnston =

Canadian ice hockey player

- Born: March 19, 2001 (age 25) Sudbury, Ontario, Canada
- Height: 5 ft 11 in (180 cm)
- Weight: 194 lb (88 kg; 13 st 12 lb)
- Position: Defence
- Shot: Middle
- Played for: Evansville Icemen; Utah Grizzlies; Edinburgh Capitals; Odense Bulldogs
- Playing career: 2009–2018

Jacob Johnston (born May 23, 1988) is a former Canadian professional ice hockey defenseman. He last played for, and captained, the Odense Bulldogs in the Metal Ligaen.

== Career statistics ==
=== Regular season and playoffs ===
| | | | Regular season | | | | | Playoffs |
| Season | Team | League | GP | G | A | Pts | PIM | GP | G | A | Pts | PIM |
|---|---|---|---|---|---|---|---|---|---|---|---|---|
| 2015–16 | Edinburgh Capitals | GBR | 30 | 9 | 15 | 24 | 26 | — | — | — | — | — |
| 2016–17 | Edinburgh Capitals | GBR | 52 | 13 | 30 | 43 | 72 | — | — | — | — | — |
| 2017–18 | Odense Bulldogs | DEN | 50 | 11 | 16 | 27 | 38 | 3 | 0 | 0 | 0 | 6 |
| Career totals | | | 599 | 96 | 255 | 351 | 494 | 33 | 7 | 13 | 20 | 44 |
