= Robin Rahm =

Swedish ice hockey player

- Born: 13 September 1986 (age 40) Torsby, Sweden
- Height: 6 ft 1 in (185 cm)
- Weight: 176 lb (80 kg; 12 st 8 lb)
- Position: Goaltender
- Catches: Left
- team Former teams: Free agent Sunne IK; Borås HC; Färjestads BK; Skåre BK; Brynäs IF; Malmö Redhawks; AIK IF; SønderjyskE Ishockey; Odense Bulldogs; Leksands IF; Graz99ers; HC GKS Katowice; HKM Zvolen; HC '05 Banská Bystrica
- Playing career: 2008–present

Lennie Arne Robin Rahm (born 13 September 1986) is a Swedish professional ice hockey goaltender. He is currently a free agent.

In August 2010, as a result of testing positive for use of doping, Rahm was suspended from all professional ice hockey in the 2010–11 season as well as 2011–12. He returned in the 2012–13 season, signing a two-year deal with then-reigning Elitserien (SEL) champions Brynäs IF.

== Playing career ==
Rahm started his senior-level career playing for his youth team Sunne IK in Sweden's third-tier league Division 1. After having been dressed as a backup goaltender sporadically since the 2002–03 season, he took over as the starting goaltender for the 2005–06 season. Playing in 22 games, he posted a .917 save percentage and was ranked as the second best goaltender in save percentage in Division 1 E that season, despite that Sunne finished second to last in their division.

During the 2006–07 season, Rahm played in 28 games and improved his save percentage to .921, again ranked second in Division 1 E, but Sunne's sixth-place finish did not qualify them for an Allettan spot and they moved on to play in the spring series where Rahm posted an impressive .942 save percentage with two shutouts in five games. During that season, Rahm was briefly loaned to Södertälje SK in HockeyAllsvenskan where he dressed as a backup for two games, and to Frölunda HC in Elitserien where he joined as an extra goaltender during practices.

After that season, he signed a two-year contract with Frölunda, and was assigned to their HockeyAllsvenskan affiliate Borås HC, but due to a groin injury during the pre-season, Rahm started the 2007–08 season with his former team Sunne in Division 1.

On August 5, 2010, it was revealed that on June 28, 2010, Rahm tested positive for use of doping. The test showed signs of anabolic steroids. On October 6, 2010, Rahm was suspended for two years. Färjestad immediately cancelled his contract with the team.

After the suspension, Rahm signed a two-year contract with reigning champions Brynäs IF of the Elitserien (SEL) on July 5, 2012 to return to the Swedish top-tier league for the 2012–13 season.

== Career statistics ==
=== Regular season ===
Season	Team	League	GP	MIN	GA	SO	GAA	SV%
2005–06	Sunne IK	Swe-3	22	1299	71	1	3.28	.917
2006–07	Sunne IK	Swe-3	33	1966	87	5	2.65	.924
2007–08	Sunne IK	Swe-3	16	920	39	0	2.54	.920
2007–08	Borås HC	Swe-2	8	480	15	0	1.88	.941
2008–09	Borås HC	Swe-2	30	1713	87	3	3.05	.889
2009–10	Skåre BK	Swe-3	1	60	1	0	1.00	.952
2009–10	Färjestads BK	SEL	19	1117	45	1	2.42	.907

=== Playoffs ===
Season	Team	League	GP	MIN	GA	SO	GAA	SV%
2007–08	Borås HC	Swe-2	4	256	10	0	2.34	.920
2009–10	Färjestads BK	SEL	7	451	17	0	2.26	.923

== Awards and honors ==
Award	Year
Slovak Extraliga
Champion	2021
