= 2017–18 Metal Ligaen season =

2017–18 Metal Liagen season
- League: (Denmark) Metal Ligaen
- Sport: Ice Hockey
- Duration: 8 September 2017 – 16 April 2018
- Number of games: 275 (50 per team)
- Number of teams: 11
- TV partner(s): TV 2 Sport

Regular season

Playoffs

Finals

Metal Ligaen seasons
- ← 2016–17 2018–19 →

The 2017–18 Metal Ligaen season was the 61st season of ice hockey in Denmark. The season got extended from 10 to 11 teams by including Hvidovre Fighters. It is Hvidovre's first season in the league since the 2012–13 season. It is also the first time ever that the league consists of 11 teams.

== Teams ==
Teams of the 2017–18 Metal Ligaen season

Teams licensed to play in the Metal Ligaen 2017–18

Team	Arena	Capacity
Aalborg Pirates	Gigantium Isarena	5,000
Esbjerg Energy	Granly Hockey Arena	4,200
Frederikshavn White Hawks	Scanel Hockey Arena	4,000
Gentofte Stars	Gentofte Skøjtehal	1,160
Herlev Eagles	DFDS Seaways Arena	1,740
Herning Blue Fox	KVIK Hockey Arena	4,105
Hvidovre Fighters	Allan Villadsen Ishockey Arena	2,000
Odense Bulldogs	Odense Isstadion	3,280
Rungsted Seier Capital	Saxo Bank Arena	2,460
Rødovre Mighty Bulls	Rødovre Skøjte Arena	3,600
SønderjyskE Ishockey	SE Arena	5,000

== Regular season ==
Pos	Team	Pld	W	OTW	OTL	L	GF	GA	GD	Pts	Qualification
1	Herning Blue Fox	50	30	8	4	8	193	124	+69	110	Qualification to Quarter-finals
2	Aalborg Pirates	50	28	4	3	15	156	111	+45	95	Qualification to Quarter-finals
3	Frederikshavn White Hawks	50	24	3	6	17	172	129	+43	84	Qualification to Quarter-finals
4	Rødovre Mighty Bulls	50	23	8	2	17	151	128	+23	87	Qualification to Quarter-finals
5	Esbjerg Energy	50	23	6	5	16	151	130	+21	86	Qualification to Quarter-finals
6	Rungsted Seier Capital	50	21	6	3	20	154	142	+12	78	Qualification to Quarter-finals
7	Odense Bulldogs	50	22	2	7	19	141	149	−8	77	Qualification to Play-in
8	Gentofte Stars	50	18	4	8	20	108	134	−26	70	Qualification to Play-in
9	SønderjyskE	50	18	4	7	21	135	143	−8	69	Qualification to Play-in
10	Herlev Eagles (Note: Herlev Eagles were deducted four points due to bad economi.)	50	10	4	2	34	107	186	−79	36	Qualification to Play-in
11	Hvidovre Fighters	50	6	3	5	36	92	184	−92	29	

Updated to match(es) played on 27 February 2018. Source: Metal Ligaen

== Play-offs ==
First round
7	Odense Bulldogs	1
10	Herlev Eagles	3
8	Gentofte Stars	1
9	SønderjyskE	3

Quarterfinals
1	Herning Blue Fox	4
10	Herlev Eagles	1
4	Esbjerg Energy	4
9	SønderjyskE	1
2	Aalborg Pirates	4
5	Frederikshavn White Hawks	0
3	Rødovre Mighty Bulls	3
6	Rungsted Seier Capital	4

Semifinals
1	Herning Blue Fox	4
6	Rungsted Seier Capital	1
(Pairings are re-seeded after the first and second round)
2	Aalborg Pirates	4
3	Esbjerg Energy	3

Finals
1	Herning Blue Fox	1
2	Aalborg Pirates	3
Third place
3	Esbjerg Energy	4^{g}
6	Rungsted Seier Capital	7^{g}

g. The score for third place is goals, not games.
