= Sebastian Strandberg =

Swedish ice hockey player

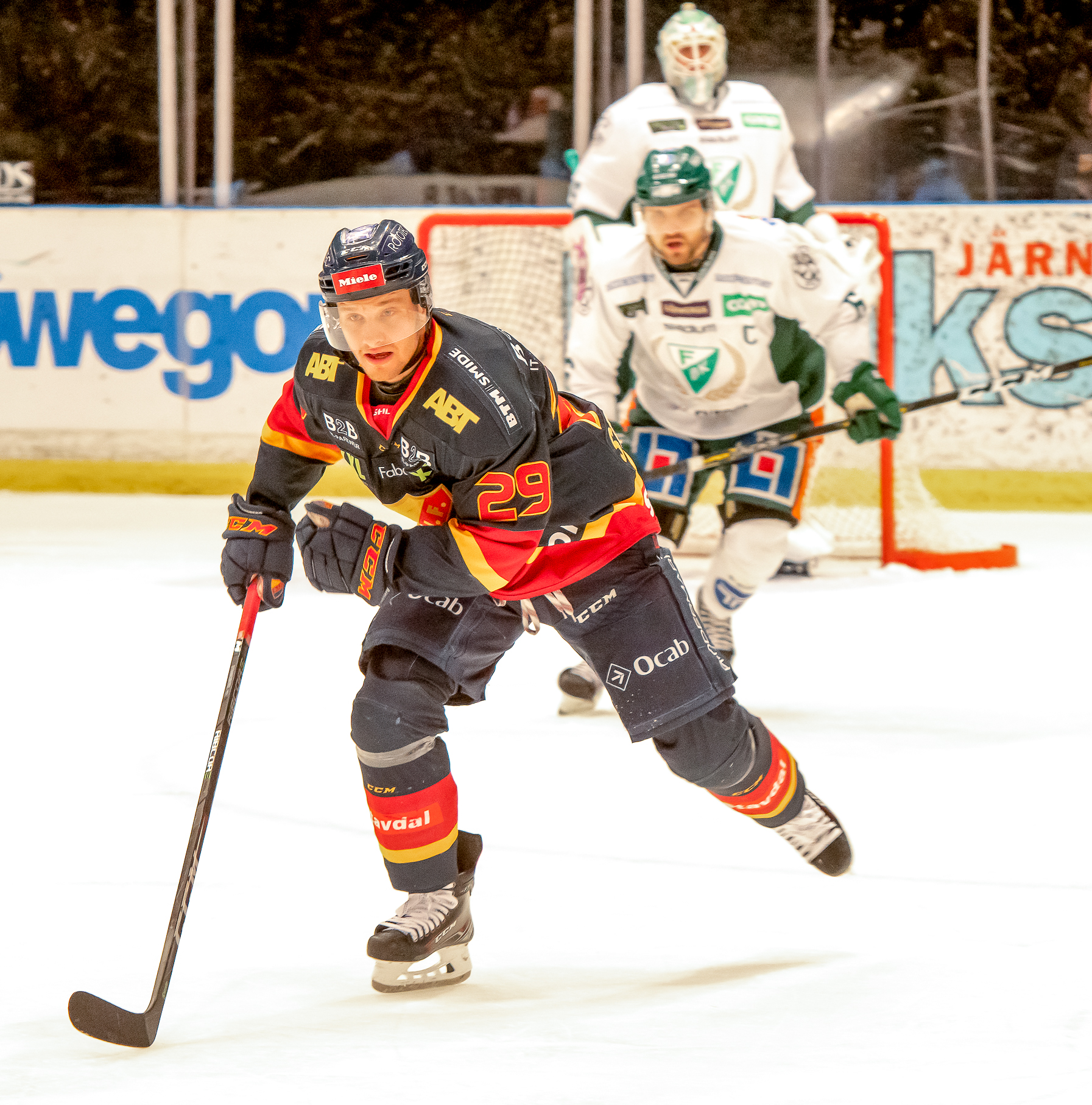
- Strandberg playing for Djurgården in 2019.
- Born: June 4, 1992 (age 33) Jönköping, Sweden
- Height: 5 ft 10 in (178 cm)
- Weight: 181 lb (82 kg; 12 st 13 lb)
- Position: Centre
- Shoots: Left
- SHL team Former teams: Växjö Lakers; HV71; Odense Bulldogs; Djurgårdens IF; Linköping HC
- NHL draft: Undrafted
- Playing career: 2010–present

Sebastian Strandberg (born June 4, 1992) is a Swedish professional ice hockey forward who currently plays for Växjö Lakers in the Swedish Hockey League (SHL).

== Playing career ==
Strandberg made his professional debut in his native Sweden with HV71 in the Elitserien during the 2010–11 Elitserien season.

During the 2014–15 season, after he was scoreless in 24 games with HV71 Strandberg was loaned to the Malmö Redhawks in the Allsvenskan on October 18, 2014. Strandberg ended his longstanding partnership with HV71 in the off-season, initially signing a contract with VIK Västerås HK before he was released just over a week later on August 14, 2015.

As a free agent, Strandberg opted to travel North America in agreeing to a one-year ECHL contract with the Evansville IceMen on September 8, 2015.

Following two seasons with Linköping HC, Strandberg left as a free agent and signed a two-year contract with Växjö Lakers on 3 May 2024.
