= Georg Sørensen =

Danish ice hockey player (1995-)

Georg Sorensen
- Sørensen in 2026
- Born: 15 May 1995 (age 31) Herning, Denmark
- Height: 5 ft 10 in (178 cm)
- Weight: 176 lb (80 kg; 12 st 8 lb)
- Position: Goaltender
- Catches: Left
- Metal team Former teams: Aalborg Pirates; Herning Blue Fox; Frederikshavn White Hawks; Almtuna IS; Södertälje SK
- National team: Denmark
- Playing career: 2011–present

Georg Sørensen (born 15 May 1995) is a Danish professional ice hockey goaltender. He is currently playing with the Aalborg Pirates of the Metal Ligaen.

Sorensen competed with Denmark men's national ice hockey team at the 2013, 2014, and 2015 World Junior Hockey Championships. In 2013 he became only the second goalie to ever score a goal in an IIHF event. He was born and raised in Herning and played for Herning IK as a youth player.
