= Kristian Jensen (ice hockey) =

Danish ice hockey player

- Born: January 22, 1996 (age 29); Odense, Denmark
- Height: 6 ft 1 in (185 cm)
- Weight: 198 lb (90 kg; 14 st 2 lb)
- Position: Forward
- Shoots: Left
- Metal team Former teams: Frederikshavn; Odense Bulldogs; Luleå HF; SønderjyskE Ishockey
- National team: Denmark
- Playing career: 2012–present

Kristian Jensen (born January 22, 1996) is a Danish professional ice hockey player. He is currently playing with Frederikshavn White Hawks of the Metal Ligaen.

Jensen made his Swedish Hockey League debut playing with Luleå HF during the 2014–15 SHL season.
