= Chet Pickard =

Canadian ice hockey player (born 1989)

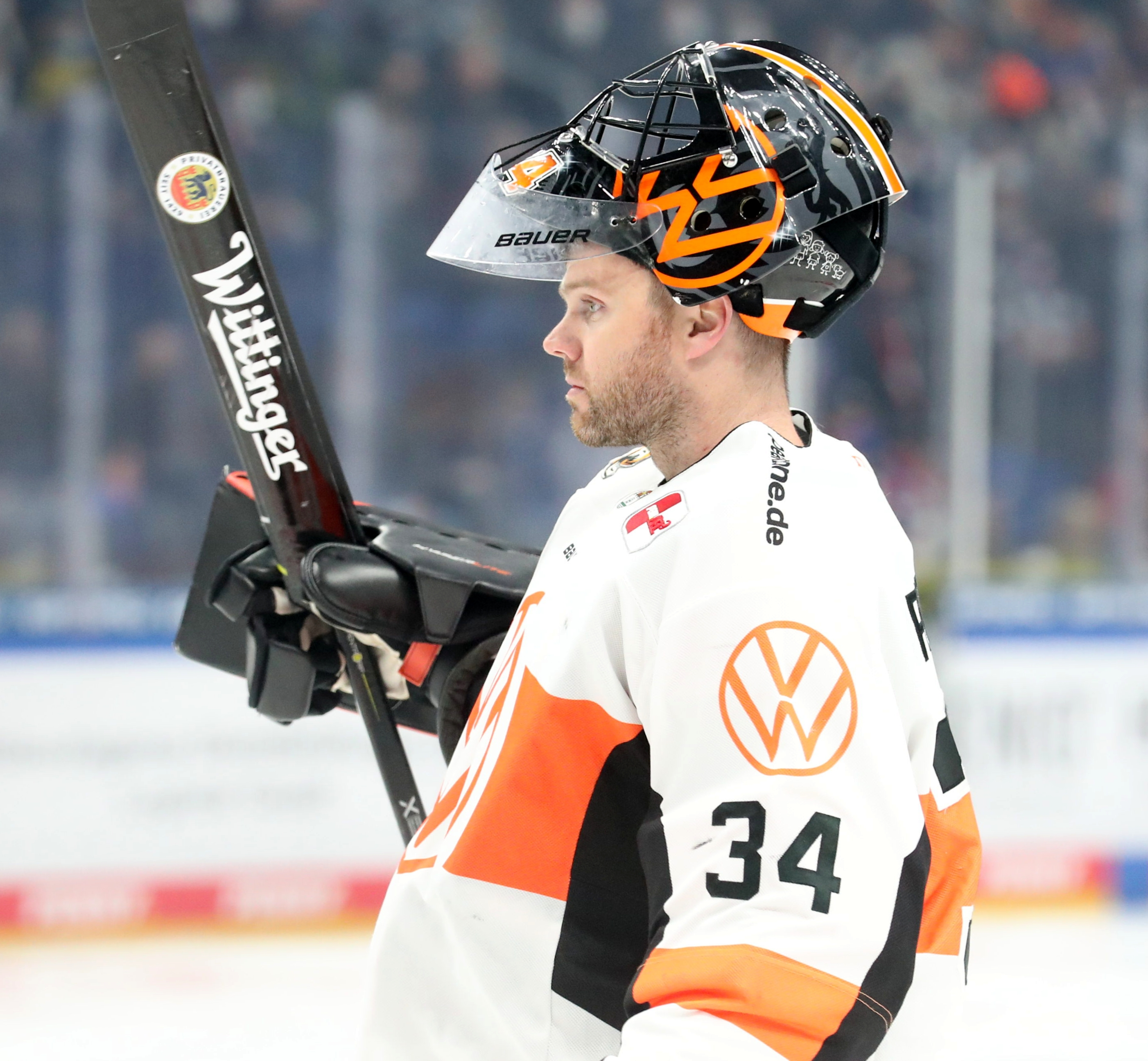
- Pickard with the Grizzlys Wolfsburg in 2022
- Born: November 29, 1989 (age 36) Moncton, New Brunswick, Canada
- Height: 6 ft 2 in (188 cm)
- Weight: 216 lb (98 kg; 15 st 6 lb)
- Position: Goaltender
- Caught: Left
- Played for: Milwaukee Admirals; Djurgårdens IF; Oklahoma City Barons; Odense Bulldogs; Iserlohn Roosters; Adler Mannheim; Grizzlys Wolfsburg
- NHL draft: 18th overall, 2008; Nashville Predators
- Playing career: 2009–2022

Chet Pickard (/ˈpɪkərd/ PIHK-uhrd; born November 29, 1989) is a German-Canadian former professional ice hockey goaltender. He most notably played in the American Hockey League and the Deutsche Eishockey Liga (DEL). He holds a German passport.

== Playing career ==
Pickard played minor hockey with the Winnipeg Monarchs before joining the major junior ranks with the Tri-City Americans of the Western Hockey League (WHL) in 2005–06. He played backup to Carey Price in his first two seasons, then took over the starting position in 2007–08 as Price graduated to the Montreal Canadiens. Pickard won 46 games, was named CHL Goaltender of the Week on December 9, 2008., and posted a 2.32 goals against average (GAA) and .920 save percentage, en route to succeeding Price as CHL Goaltender of the Year. He was additionally awarded the Del Wilson Trophy as the top WHL goaltender and was named to the WHL West and CHL First All-Star Teams.

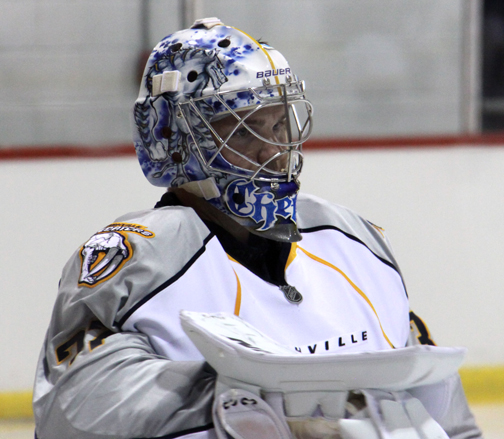
Pickard playing for the Nashville Predators in a rookie game vs. the Florida Panthers

In the off-season, he was drafted by the Nashville Predators in the first round, 18th overall, in the 2008 NHL entry draft. In 2008–09, he recorded a 2.28 GAA and .921 save percentage, while helping lead the Americans to their second straight U.S. Division title. He was nominated for his second Del Wilson Trophy opposite Braden Holtby of the Saskatoon Blades and named to the WHL West First All-Star Team.

Pickard played most of the 2010–11 season with the Cincinnati Cyclones of the ECHL and Milwaukee Admirals of the AHL. During the 2011 Stanley Cup playoffs he was called up to the Nashville Predators before their 2nd round series with the Vancouver Canucks; however, he did not get into a game.

In the 2012–13 season, Pickard signed his first contract abroad, agreeing to a one-year deal with Swedish HockeyAllsvenskan side, Djurgårdens IF. In 45 games, Pickard earned a professional career-high 25 wins to help Djurgården advance to the Kvalserien playoffs.

Pickard returned to North America in the off-season and agreed to a try-out at the San Antonio Rampage training camp for the 2013–14 season. He was later released by the Rampage before on November 8, 2013, he was signed to an AHL deal with the Oklahoma City Barons and then loaned to the Bakersfield Condors of the ECHL.

On June 10, 2014, Pickard returned for another stint in Europe, signing a one-year contract to be the starting goaltender with Danish club Odense Bulldogs of the Metal Ligaen. At the starting goaltender with the Bulldogs, Pickard enjoyed a successful season in appearing in 36 games.

On May 22, 2015, Pickard left Denmark to sign an optional two-year deal with German club Iserlohn Roosters of the DEL. He was slated to begin as the backup to starting goaltender Mathias Lange. In the 2016–17 season with the Roosters, Pickard appeared in 26 games with the Roosters, posting just 6 wins as Iserlohn finished out of playoff contention. On March 3, 2017, it was announced that Pickard would not re-new his contract.

On April 28, 2017, Pickard decided to continue in the DEL, agreeing to a two-year contract to assume the backup duties with Adler Mannheim.

After claiming the DEL Championship in his final season under contract with Mannheim in 2018–19, Pickard left as a free agent to sign a two-year contract with Grizzlys Wolfsburg on May 2, 2019.

Following his third year with Grizzlys Wolfsburg in the 2021–22 season, and despite being under contract, Pickard ended his 13-year professional career by announcing his retirement on July 26, 2022.

== International play ==
Medal record

Representing Canada

Ice hockey

World Junior Championships
Gold medal – first place	2009 Ottawa	

Playing in his fourth junior season, Pickard was selected by Team Canada for the 2009 World Junior Championships. He played in two games as backup to Dustin Tokarski of the Spokane Chiefs, helping Canada to their fifth straight gold medal.

== Personal ==
Pickard was born in Moncton, New Brunswick to parents, Cathy and Dan. They later moved to Winnipeg, Manitoba when he was ten. His younger brother, Calvin, a second-round draft pick of the Colorado Avalanche in 2010, is also a professional goaltender, currently playing for the Minnesota Wild. He also has a sister, Kelly.

Pickard is married to Meghan Corbett; Meghan gave birth to their first child in October 2016.

== Career statistics ==
=== Regular season and playoffs ===
			Regular season									Playoffs
Season	Team	League	GP	W	L	T/OT	MIN	GA	SO	GAA	SV%	GP	W	L	MIN	GA	SO	GAA	SV%
2005–06	Tri-City Americans	WHL	26	9	9	1	1270	62	3	2.93	.897	—	—	—	—	—	—	—	—
2006–07	Tri-City Americans	WHL	29	17	10	1	1577	75	1	2.85	.903	1	0	0	20	1	0	3.00	.800
2007–08	Tri-City Americans	WHL	64	46	12	4	3779	146	2	2.32	.918	16	11	3	1010	30	3	1.78	.937
2008–09	Tri-City Americans	WHL	50	35	12	3	2947	112	6	2.28	.921	11	6	4	650	37	0	3.41	.877
2009–10	Milwaukee Admirals	AHL	36	14	16	3	2024	96	1	2.85	.892	1	0	0	12	1	0	5.08	.900
2010–11	Milwaukee Admirals	AHL	7	1	4	1	365	18	0	2.96	.899	—	—	—	—	—	—	—	—
2010–11	Cincinnati Cyclones	ECHL	29	9	14	3	1506	85	1	3.39	.877	—	—	—	—	—	—	—	—
2011–12	Cincinnati Cyclones	ECHL	32	14	12	2	1805	94	1	3.12	.890	—	—	—	—	—	—	—	—
2012–13	Djurgårdens IF	Allsv	45	25	20	0	2650	95	5	2.15	.918	6	3	2	330	18	0	3.28	.895
2013–14	Bakersfield Condors	ECHL	21	6	11	1	1106	59	0	3.20	.875	—	—	—	—	—	—	—	—
2013–14	Oklahoma City Barons	AHL	6	1	2	0	202	18	0	5.34	.854	—	—	—	—	—	—	—	—
2014–15	Odense Bulldogs	DEN	36	—	—	—	—	—	—	2.65	.909	4	—	—	—	—	—	2.73	.914
2015–16	Iserlohn Roosters	DEL	26	11	13	0	1504	60	2	2.39	.932	2	0	1	80	7	0	5.25	.870
2016–17	Iserlohn Roosters	DEL	26	6	14	0	1329	66	0	2.98	.920	—	—	—	—	—	—	—	—
2017–18	Adler Mannheim	DEL	16	5	9	0	866	35	3	2.42	.908	2	0	0	65	3	0	2.78	.880
2018–19	Adler Mannheim	DEL	24	19	4	0	1379	45	3	1.96	.913	—	—	—	—	—	—	—	—
2019–20	Grizzlys Wolfsburg	DEL	21	7	13	0	1203	65	0	3.24	.898	—	—	—	—	—	—	—	—
2020–21	Grizzlys Wolfsburg	DEL	15	6	9	0	901	40	0	2.66	.909	1	0	0	0	0	0	0.00	1.000
2021–22	Grizzlys Wolfsburg	DEL	16	8	8	0	952	46	1	2.90	.894	1	0	0	19	0	0	0.00	1.000
AHL totals			49	16	22	4	2591	132	1	3.06	.889	1	0	0	12	1	0	5.08	.900

=== International ===
Year	Team	Event	Result	GP	W	L	T	MIN	GA	SO	GAA	SV%
2009	Canada	WJC	1st place, gold medalist(s)	2	2	0	0	120	1	1	0.50	.975
Junior totals				2	2	0	0	120	1	1	0.50	.975

== Awards and honours ==
Award	Year
WHL
West First All-Star Team	2008, 2009
Del Wilson Trophy	2008, 2009
CHL First All-Star Team	2008
CHL Goaltender of the Year	2008
DEL
Champion (Adler Mannheim)	2019

Awards and achievements
Preceded by Colin Wilson	Nashville Predators first-round draft pick 2008	Succeeded by Ryan Ellis
Preceded by Carey Price	Winner of the WHL Del Wilson Trophy; 2008, 2009	Succeeded by Martin Jones
