= Michael Eskesen =

Danish ice hockey player

- Born: June 5, 1986 (age 38); Odense, Denmark
- Height: 6 ft 0 in (183 cm)
- Weight: 176 lb (80 kg; 12 st 8 lb)
- Position: Defence
- Shoots: Left
- Metal Ligaen team Former teams: Odense Bulldogs; Stjernen Hockey; Rødovre Mighty Bulls; SønderjyskE Ishockey
- National team: Denmark
- NHL draft: Undrafted
- Playing career: 2002–present

Michael Eskesen (born June 5, 1986) is a Danish professional ice hockey defenceman who currently plays for the Odense Bulldogs of the Metal Ligaen.

Eskesen played for the Danish national team at the 2011 IIHF World Championship.
