= Mikael Gath =

Swedish ice hockey player and coach (born 1976)

- Born: 17 June 1976 (age 50) Glumslöv, Sweden
- Height: 6 ft 1 in (185 cm)
- Weight: 216 lb (98 kg; 15 st 6 lb)
- Position: Right wing
- Shot: Left
- Played for: Rögle BK
- Playing career: 1995–2012

Mikael Gath (born 17 June 1976) is a Swedish ice hockey coach and former player. He is currently coaching the Danish national hockey team for men.
