= Sean Wiles =

American ice hockey player

- Born: July 15, 1987 (age 37); Beloit, Wisconsin, USA
- Height: 6 ft 3 in (191 cm)
- Weight: 203 lb (92 kg; 14 st 7 lb)
- Position: Forward
- Shoots: Right
- Metal team Former teams: Odense Bulldogs; Bridgeport Sound Tigers
- NHL draft: Undrafted
- Playing career: 2011–present

Sean Wiles (born June 15, 1987) is an American professional ice hockey player. He is currently playing for the Odense Bulldogs of the Metal Ligaen.

Wiles attended the University of Alaska Anchorage from 2007 to 2011 where he played NCAA college hockey with the Alaska Anchorage Seawolves registering 22 goals, 26 assists, and 79 penalty minutes in 111 games played.

On September 7, 2011, the Las Vegas Wranglers of the ECHL announced they had signed Wiles to his first professional contract.

After two seasons with the Wranglers, Wiles left as a free agent to sign with ECHL Champions, the Reading Royals on August 13, 2013.

At the conclusion of the 2014–15 season with the Royals, Wiles signed his first contract abroad in agreeing to a one-year deal with Danish outfit, the Odense Bulldogs of the Metal Ligaen on June 23, 2015.
