= Rødovre Skøjte Arena =

Ice hockey stadium in Denmark

Coordinates: 55°40′50″N 12°26′29″E

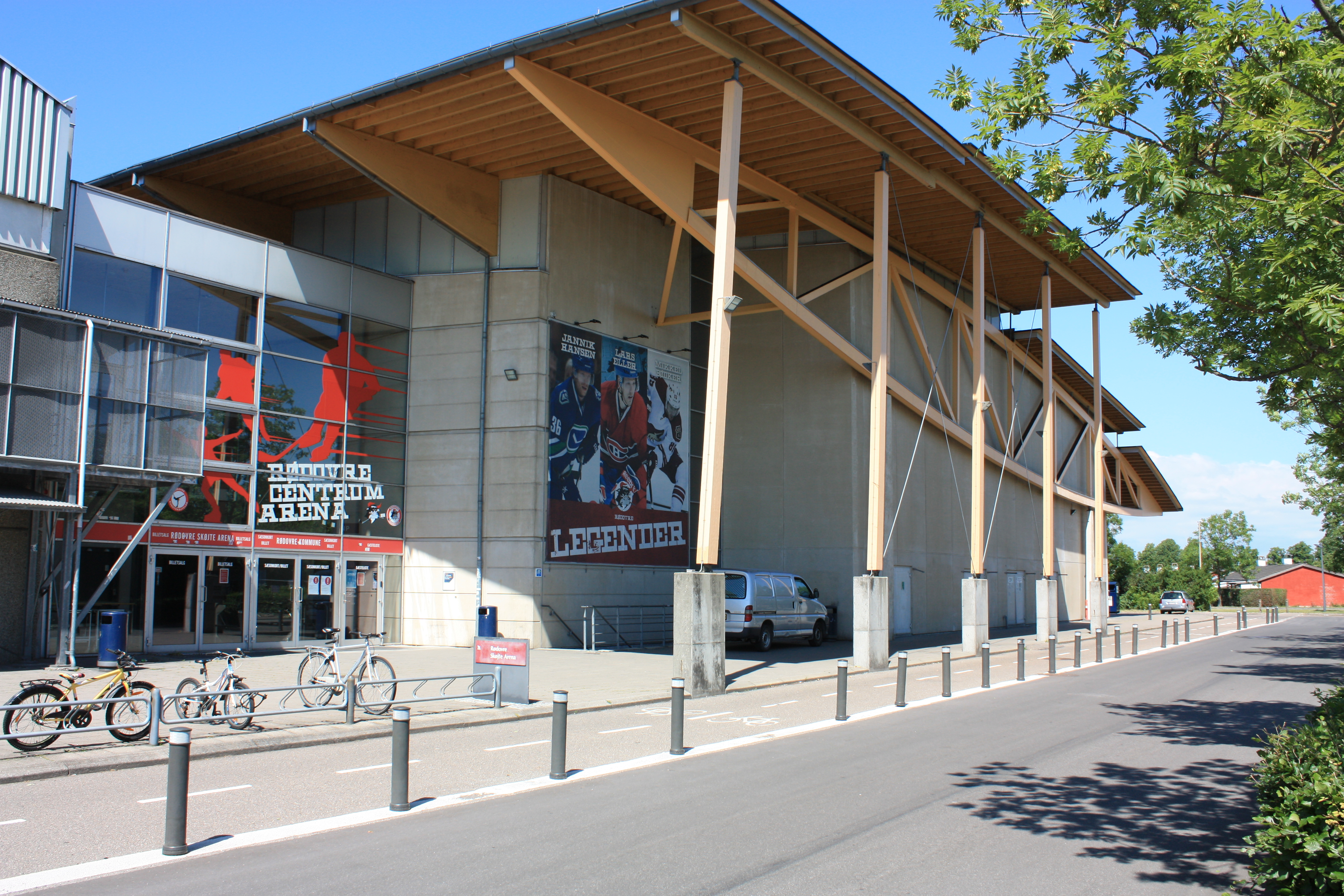
- Interactive map of Rødovre Skøjte Arena
- Location: Rødovre Parkvej 425; 2610 Rødovre
- Operator: Rødovre Mighty Bulls
- Capacity: 3,600 (seats: 2012)

Construction
- Built: 1994

Tenants
- Rødovre Mighty Bulls (1995–present); Rødovre Skøjte & Ishockey Klub (1995–present)

Rødovre Skøjte Arena (as a result of a name sponsorship also known as Rødovre Centrum Arena), is an ice hockey arena in Rødovre, Greater Copenhagen. The arena, inaugurated on 6 February 1995, is home to both the Rødovre Mighty Bulls and the parent club RSIK and is used for both figure skating and ice hockey.

The arena replaced the old Rødovre Ice Skating Hall (Rødovre Skøjtehal) with the nickname Kostalden (cow shed), which was in the northeastern part of Rødovre at Rødovrevej. Rødovre Skøjte Arena is located on Rødovre Parkvej and is built together with the sporting arena Rødovrehallen via an entrance foyer. From this foyer there is access to both the spectator seats and the basement where the changing rooms are located. On the western end, the arena is connected to a secondary practice rink. The Rødovre Ice Skating Arena was built after a Norwegian model, in particular the ice hockey arena that were built for the Olympic Winter Games in Lillehammer. This is reflected, among other things, in the roof construction, which slopes out towards Rødovre Parkvej, so that the seating area on the opposite side is higher and can accommodate more spectators. The arena has a total capacity of 3,600 spectators, with 2,012 seated and standing sections behind each goal, making it one of the larger ice hockey arenas in Denmark. The attendance record of 3,600 was set on 23 March 1998 in a game against the Frederikshavn White Hawks.

In 2009, a practice rink was built in connection with the main arena. The practice rink is built to North American size, making it smaller than the IIHF size used in Denmark. On top of the practice rink, there is an indoor tennis court.

In 2020, an LED scoreboard was added over centre ice. Also in 2020, the boards will be replaced with a more flexible variety.
