= Ryan McDonough (ice hockey) =

Canadian ice hockey player

- Born: February 1, 1988 (age 38) Etobicoke, Ontario, Canada
- Height: 5 ft 10 in (178 cm)
- Weight: 180 lb (82 kg; 12 st 12 lb)
- Position: Centre
- Shoots: Left
- DEL2 team Former teams: SC Riessersee; EBEL; EC Red Bull Salzburg; DEL2; EV Landshut; Hannover Indians; ECHL; San Francisco Bulls
- National team: Canada
- Playing career: 2008–present

Ryan McDonough (born January 2, 1988) is a Canadian professional ice hockey forward who played for several teams in Europe.

McDonough played junior hockey in the Ontario Hockey League, spending one season with the Sudbury Wolves and three seasons with the Saginaw Spirit. He led the Spirit in points in 2005–06 with 88 points and in 2007-08 he led the team in goals with 45. Despite this, McDonough remained undrafted in the 2008 NHL entry draft. He turned pro in 2008 and signed with EC Red Bull Salzburg in the Austrian Hockey League.

After a season with Salzburg, McDonough returned briefly to North America to attend and play hockey with the University of Western Ontario before leaving to play for EV Landshut in the second German league.

After one season in the Italian league Elite.A with HC Valpellice and two seasons with the Hannover Indians back in the 2nd Bundesliga in Germany, on August 27, 2013, McDonough returned to North America yet again, signing a one-year two-way contract with the Worcester Sharks of the AHL, though before playing a game with the Sharks, he was assigned to their ECHL affiliate, the San Francisco Bulls before being released on December 10, 2014.

On January 8, 2014, after being released by the Sharks, McDonough returned to Valpellice in Italy.

April 16, 2014 McDonough signed with Odense Bulldogs being their topscorer for the 2014–16 season. McDonough resigned from the Bulldogs for season 2015–16. McDonough decided to return to German hockey by signing with SC Riessersee for 2016–17.

== Career statistics ==
=== Regular season and playoffs ===
			Regular season					Playoffs
Season	Team	League	GP	G	A	Pts	PIM	GP	G	A	Pts	PIM
2004–05	Sudbury Wolves	OHL	58	15	22	37	31	12	2	2	4	12
2005–06	Saginaw Spirit	OHL	68	39	49	88	71	4	0	1	1	8
2006–07	Saginaw Spirit	OHL	66	34	36	70	67	6	0	2	2	2
2007–08	Saginaw Spirit	OHL	66	45	44	89	85	4	2	2	4	8
2008–09	EC Red Bull Salzburg	EBEL	47	9	16	25	36	7	1	0	1	8
2009–10	Western Ontario Mustangs	CIS	2	0	1	1	2	—	—	—	—	—
2009–10	Landshut Cannibals	2.GBun	36	16	29	45	48	6	1	3	4	2
2010–11	HC Valpellice	ITL	40	26	26	52	62	2	1	1	2	12
2011–12	Hannover Indians	2.GBun	46	15	40	55	56	4	1	1	2	12
2012–13	Hannover Indians	2.GBun	41	13	19	32	34	—	—	—	—	—
2013–14	San Francisco Bulls	ECHL	8	0	1	1	4	—	—	—	—	—
2014-15	Odense Bulldogs	Metal Ligaen	33	24	22	46	52	4	0	0	0	0
2015-16	Odense Bulldogs	Metal Ligaen	45	27	33	60	34	7	1	1	2	6
2.GBun totals			123	44	88	132	138	10	2	4	6	14

=== International ===
Year	Team	Event	Place	GP	G	A	Pts	PIM
2005	Canada Ontario	U-17 WHC	4th	6	5	6	11	2
2006	Canada	U-18 WC	4th	7	0	0	0	14
