= Odense Bulldogs =

- City: Odense
- League: Metal Ligaen
- Founded: 1978
- Home arena: Odense Isstadion (Capacity: 3,280)
- Colors
- Owner: Bulldogs Odense ApS
- Head coach: Mike Flanagan
- Website: bulldogs.dk

The Odense Bulldogs are a professional ice hockey team based in Odense, Denmark. They currently play in Ret&Råd Fyn Arena in the Bolbro area, as a part of the best Danish league Metal Ligaen, and they are furthermore the only hockey team from Funen. The team was founded in 1978 and was promoted to the top league in 1991. In the 2024/2025 season the Odense Bulldogs won their first ever Danish championship winning the final series 4-1 against Herning Blue Fox. The last time Odense Bulldogs was in the finals was in the 2011/2012 season, also against Herning Blue Fox who claimed the title winning three games in a row to make the series 4-3.

== Club history ==
=== 1999–2004: Simioni era ===
After having been in the league for eight years Odense Bulldogs acquired Mario Simioni and named him player-coach for the 1999–2000 season. for the 2000–01 season Simioni retired as hockey player and was named head coach of the team. Under Simioni, Odense Bulldogs went to the finals for the first time in club history in 2001–02, but ended up losing to Rungsted IK. In the 2002–03 season, Simioni took the bulldogs to their second playoff final in two years, but again ended up losing this time to Herning Blue Fox. Mario Simioni coached Bulldogs for one more year, before traveling to Germany and then SønderjyskE, resulting in the end of an era. It would take Odense Bulldogs 9 years before returning to the playoff finals.

=== 2008–2014: Pär Johansson, return to finals ===
Though leaving Odense Bulldogs for the 07–08 season, Pär Johansson returned to Odense Bulldogs and was named Assistant Coach under Head Coach Dean Fedorchuk for the 08–09 and 09–10 seasons. After losing the Bronze medal game and missing the playoffs for the 08–09 and 09–10 seasons, it was the newly named Head Coach Pär Johanssons job to get Odense Bulldogs back on track. In his first year as Head Coach for the 10–11 season Johansson did not get Bulldogs to the playoffs and had to settle for 8th place.

After missing the playoffs two years in a row, something that had not happened since their two first seasons (91–92, 92–93), Odense Bulldogs suddenly found themselves returning to the Playoff finals, in a glorious playoff run. Winning the first two round by a score of 8–0, Odense Bulldogs headed to the finals against Herning Bluefox undefeated. After getting the lead 2–0 and 3–1 in games, Odense Bulldogs had a chance to win their first championship ever at home. Not only did Odense bulldogs lose the first elimination game, but the follow two games, resulting in a game seven final loss at home.

Following a game seven loss in the 2011–12 season and another bronze game loss in 2012–13, Pär Johansson left the club mid January 2014. Henrik Benjaminsen and Odense Bulldogs alumni Mads True coached Odense Bulldogs for the remainder for the season and an early Playoff exit.

=== 2014–2016: Gratton and Cup champions ===
==== 2014–15 season ====
After firing their old coach, Bulldogs acquired head coach Brad Gratton from Rødovre Mighty Bulls. Among their eight foreigners was 1st round pick by the Nashville Predators, Chet Pickard. Keyplayers such as Canadian winger Dale Mitchell and Center Ryan McDonough was also acquired. Odense dominated a huge part of the regular season with a 12-game winning streak, making them league leaders. They lost many of their last games of the season and had to settle for 4th place After winning the first Quarterfinal game 8–2 in the Metal Cup tournament against Herning Blue Fox, Odense lost the second game 8–1, resulting in an early exit in the 2014–15 Metal Cup tournament

After ending in fourth place, Bulldogs picked 5th Esbjerg Energy. After losing the first four games, Bulldogs playoff run ended in the quarterfinals

==== 2015–16 season ====
After losing all four games out of seven to Esbjerg Energy in the quarter-finals in the 2014–15 season, the Bulldogs extended contract with keyplayers such as Dale Mitchell, Ryan McDonough and Joakim Nettelbladt. After sending last years netminder Chet Pickard to Iserlohn Roosters, the Bulldogs signed Czech goaltender Tadeas Galansky and two big forwards, American winger Sean Wiles and Canadien center John Armstrong. After issues with former captain Morten Andreassen resulting in him being sent down to the minors, Joakim Nettelbladt became the 7th Bulldogs captain in 9 years, with Ryan McDonough, Dale Mitchell, Mike Daugulis and Søren B. Pedersen Serving as alternates. Odense Bulldogs was the most scoring team, with 191 goals for in 45 games. Odense was the 4th worst defensive team, letting up 154 Goals against. The Bulldogs ended on 5th place and no home advantage.

In the annual cup tournament, Odense Bulldogs won their first game of the tournament against Gentofte Stars 4–2. In the quarterfinals they won both games against Herlev Eagles 6–3 and 5–3. Odense won both games in the semifinals against Aalborg Pirates, advancing to the 2015-16 Cup finals. The bulldogs won against league leading Frederikshavn White Hawks 4–0, taking home 4th Cup. Goaltender Tadeas Galansky was named Cup Final MVP.

Bulldogs were picked by 4th place Herning Blue Fox for the 2015-16 Metal Ligaen playoff quarterfinals. Game one resulted in a 2–1 home win to Herning. Game two was a Shootout victory by Odense, evening out the score 1–1 after two games. in Game three Bulldogs lost 6–1. Game four was a 2–1 victory to the bulldogs, again making the overall score 2–2. Game five was won in overtime on a goal by Dale Mitchell, giving Odense a 3–2 lead. Odense loss 2–1 at home making the series 3–3 resulting in a game 7. In game 7 Odense Bulldogs lost in overtime, after tying the game with less than 2 minutes left. The game 7 quarterfinal loss, ended the 2015–16 season for the bulldogs, resulting in the 3rd quarterfinal exit in three years.

For the 2015–16 season Odense Bulldogs were part of a 10-episode TV documentary, Men of steel: Odense Bulldogs (Mænd af stål). It was the first time in Danish sports history that such TV series about a team were filmed. The series was broadcast on TV 2 Sport.

=== 2016–2017: Peter Johansson ===
Odense Bulldogs decided not to resign coach Brad Gratton, instead they signed former Frederikshavn Whitehawks coach Peter Johansson. After locking up last years Metal Cup MVP, Goaltender Tadeas Galansky to a two-year contract extension, they also signed former captain and Odense native, Michael Eskesen. They also resigned last year Metal ligaen topscorer and Bulldogs star Dale Mitchell to a one-year contract, making it his third season with the Bulldogs. From Lørenskog Odense Bulldogs acquired forward Tony Romano and Robin Sterner. On September 7 it was announced that Michael Eskesen, for the second in his career and as a Bulldog, would serve as captain of the team, with Dale Mitchell and Simon Grønvaldt as alternates. To start of the season, the Odense Bulldogs were eliminated from the annual Metal Cup tournament, losing 3–2 to Aalborg Pirates, with Pirates scoring the game winner with only 14 seconds left.

After clinching the IIHF Continental Cup final at home, Odense Bulldogs won 10 in a row, making them undefeated in December and 15 straight games with at least one point. Odense Bulldogs played the Continental Cup finals in Ritten against Nottingham Panthers, Ritten Rittner Baum and Beibarys Atyrau. First game of the tournament was a 2–0 loss to the Panthers. Second day of play resulted in a 4–1 win to the Bulldogs. On the third and final day and still being able to win it all, the Odense Bulldogs lost in OT to the Beibarys Atyrau, with the Kazakhs tying the game with only 14 seconds left. The Odense bulldogs would go home to Denmark with an overall good performance and a bronze medal.

The Odense Bulldogs finished 2nd place in the 2016/17 regular season, for the first time in 5 years. the 2016/17 season was also their most winning season, with 31 wins in 45 games. Making it the season with the best win/game ratio. The Odense Bulldogs choose Rungsted Seier Capital, who finished 8th, to meet them in the quarterfinales. Odense advanced to the semifinals for the first time in 4 years by winning the first 4 games in the 7 game series. In the semifinals Odense Bulldogs lost to Gentofte Stars 4–1 in the best of 7 series.

=== 2017–present ===
==== 2017–18 season ====
Following a semifinal exit the year before, head coach Peter Johansson left the club along with other star players, such as 16/17 league leading goalie Tadeas Galansky. Two time topscorer Dale Mitchell, was the only foreign player to extend his contract, making it his fourth year in a row as a Bulldog. Bulldogs signed 55-year old Finnish Kari Rauhanen as head coach. But after only ten regular season games, he decided to stop due to "personal matters". The board immediately hired Mikael Gath as new head coach.

== European appearances ==
In June 2016, it was decided that Odense Bulldogs were to host the 2016–17 IIHF Continental Cup semifinals in November 2016. This was going to be the club's second European appearance and first time hosting one. Odense Bulldogs clinched the Continental cup finals with a second place in the semifinals after wins over Rouen and Donbass. In the finals they lost to Nottingham Panthers, won against Ritten, but lost in overtime to the Kazakhian team Atyrau, making them third overall and had to settle for a bronze medal.

== Season by season record ==
Seasons of Odense Bulldogs
Season	Rank	GP	W	L	OTW	OTL	Pts	Postseason
2002–03	1st	28	19	8	2	0	61	Final loss
2003–04	4th	36	15	14	3	4	55	Bronze medal
2004–05	7th	36	12	18	3	3	45	Quarterfinal loss
2005–06	7th	36	12	18	1	5	43	Quarterfinal loss
2006–07	2nd	36	19	9	2	6	67	Quarterfinal loss
2007–08	5th	45	17	17	4	7	68	Quarterfinal loss
2008–09	3rd	36	18	11	4	3	65	Bronze medal game loss
2009–10	9th	36	7	21	4	4	33	Did not make the playoffs
2010–11	8th	39	8	25	3	3	33	Did not make the playoffs
2011–12	2nd	40	23	12	4	1	78	Final loss
2012–13	5th	40	17	17	4	2	61	Bronze medal game loss
2013–14	6th	40	14	22	1	3	47	Quarter final loss
2014–15	4th	36	17	12	6	1	64	Quarter final loss
2015–16	5th	45	22	18	3	2	73	Quarter final loss
2016–17	2nd	45	22	10	9	4	88	Bronze medal game loss
2017–18	10th							Did not make the play-offs

== Players ==
=== Current roster ===
Updated 5 October 2024.

No.	Nat	Player	Pos	S/G	Age	Acquired	Birthplace
42	(Denmark)	Daniel Baastrup Andersen (C)	D	L	26	2024	Gladsaxe, Denmark
9	(United States)	Blake Bennett	LW	L	27	2024	Grand Island, New York, United States
1	(Sweden)	Fredrik Bergvik	G	L	31	2023	Stockholm, Sweden
17	(Denmark)	Jonas Bjerrum	F	L	24	2023	Esbjerg, Denmark
23	(Denmark)	Magnus Boesen	RW	L	22	2024	Aalborg, Denmark
74	(Denmark)	Jonathan Brinkman	LW	L	24	2023	Aalborg, Denmark
22	(Latvia)	Filips Buncis	C	L	28	2024	Jelgava, Latvia
6	(United States)	Brandon Estes	D	R	29	2024	Richardson, Texas, United States
59	(Denmark)	Mikkel Hansen	D	L	26	2020	Hvidovre, Denmark
86	(Denmark)	Kristian Jensen	LW	L	30	2022	Odense, Denmark
25	(Denmark)	Markus Jensen	LW	L	30	2022	Herning, Denmark
21	(Denmark)	Jeppe Jul Korsgaard	LW	L	28	2024	Aalborg, Denmark
28	(Denmark)	Martin Larsen (A)	D	R	31	2014	Odense, Denmark
89	(Denmark)	Sebastian Maddock Rasmussen	RW	L	22	2024	Odense, Denmark
45	(Denmark)	Mathias Mølgaard	F	L	32	2021	Herning, Denmark
90	(Denmark)	Radim Piroutek	LW	L	26	2022	Frederikshavn, Denmark
77	(Canada)	Michael Prapavessis	D	L	30	2024	Mississauga, Ontario, Canada
91	(Denmark)	Simon Schleicher	RW	L	25	2024	Herning, Denmark
30	(Denmark)	Frederik Søgaard	G	L	25	2022	Herning, Denmark
11	(Sweden)	Joakim Thelin	RW	R	33	2023	Stockholm, Sweden
44	(Denmark)	Jeppe Urup Mogensen	D	R	27	2024	Odense, Denmark
57	(Denmark)	Oliver Villadsen	D	L	21	2023	Aalborg, Denmark

=== Honored members ===
Odense Bulldogs retired numbers
No.	Player	Position	Career
7	Lars Oxholm	D	1994–2006
12	Mads True	C	1990–1995, 2002-12

=== Captains ===
- Scott Matzka, 2006–08
- Mads True, 2008–11
- Michael Eskesen, 2011–12
- Zach Tarkir, 2012–13
- Søren Pedersen, 2013–14
- Morten Andreasen, 2014–15
- Joakim Nettelbladt, 2015–16
- Michael Eskesen, 2016–17
- Jacob Johnston, 2017–18
- Martin Larsen, 2018–present

== Club officials ==
- Owner: Bulldogs Odense ApS

Board

- Chairman: Henrik Benjaminsen
- Members of the board: Vandy Bæk Thorsen, Michael Hjortholm, Angus King, Irene Blomberg, Anders Blicher Petersen, Thomas Andersen

Administration

- Acting director: Angus King
- Sales manager: Allan Hoffmann
- Seller: Michael Nystrøm Svendsen
- Communication manager: Jonas Kvist Jepsen

Coaching staff

- Head coach: Mike Flanagan
- Assistant coach: Mads True
- Interim helping coach: Andreas Lilja
- Physical coach: Søren Jakobsen

Material staff

- Material: Christian Ebersbach, Jørgen Grønbæk, Henrik 'Kondi' Nielsen, Steen Ravnborg, Torben Clausen

Medical & sports science staff

- Club doctor: Henrik Ømark, Jens Faaborg-Andersen, Karsten Bülow, Søren Mikkelsen, Kristian Moi Vårdal
- Physioterapist: Rasmus Holst
