= Aalborg Pirates =

Danish ice hockey team

Coordinates: 57°1′5″N 9°57′45″E

- City: Aalborg, Denmark
- League: Metal Ligaen
- Founded: 2012 (1967)
- Home arena: Bentax Isarena, Capacity: 5,000
- Colours: Red, white, black
- General manager: (Denmark) Ronny Larsen
- Head coach: Heinz Ehlers
- Captain: (Denmark) Julian Jakobsen
- Website: www.aalborgpirates.dk

The Aalborg Pirates (previously known as Aalborg Ishockey and AaB Ice Hockey) are a professional ice hockey team based in Aalborg, Denmark. They play in the top tier Danish ice hockey league, Metal Ligaen. The ice hockey team first appeared in 1967 as AaB Ice Hockey organized under Aalborg Boldspilklub. They play in the Danish national league and won the Danish league championship in 1981.

In 1997 AaB Ishockey merged with a smaller club, IK Aalborg. The merged team was known as Aalborg Ishockey Klub (AIK) in the period 1997–2003, but following financial instability in the club, the professional license was transferred to Aalborg Boldspilklub ('AaB’). The team is located in Aalborg in the northern part of Jutland and ceased operations at the end of the 2011/12 season, where it was put up for sale. In 2012 the team was bought by investors with the majority of the shares owned by entrepreneur and investor Magnus Kjøller. The team was replaced by a whole new team and organisation launched a "Masterplan 2018”

== Players ==
=== Current roster ===
Updated 8 September 2024.

No.	Nat	Player	Pos	S/G	Age	Acquired	Birthplace
11	(Denmark)	Thomas Vilstrup Andersen	RW	R	32	2023	Herning, Denmark
26	(Denmark)	Patrick Bjorkstrand	RW	L	34	2021	Herning, Denmark
31	(Denmark)	Marcus Bøhme Bjørn	G	L	22	2024	Rødovre, Denmark
2	(Denmark)	Sebastian Brinkman	C	L	29	2024	Aalborg, Denmark
29	(Denmark)	Jonas Brøndberg	D	L	25	2023	Aalborg, Denmark
24	(Denmark)	Nikolaj Carstensen	D	L	30	2017	Vojens, Denmark
97	(Denmark)	Oliver Anker Christensen	C	L	29	2022	Aalborg, Denmark
77	(Canada)	Darien Craighead	RW	R	29	2024	Surrey, British Columbia, Canada
27	(Denmark)	Sebastian Ehlers	C	L	33	2024	Aalborg, Denmark
2	(United States)	Darian Gotz	D	R	26	2024	Hermantown, Minnesota, United States
6	(United States)	Eric Gotz	D	R	28	2024	Hermantown, Minnesota, United States
9	(Denmark)	Jonas Jakobsen	RW	L	26	2024	Aalborg, Denmark
61	(Denmark)	Julian Jakobsen (C)	C	L	39	2016	Aalborg, Denmark
7	(Russia)	Kirill Kabanov	RW	R	34	2019	Moscow, Russia
32	(Denmark)	Lasse Bo Knudsen (C)	D	L	30	2015	Aalborg, Denmark
87	(Denmark)	Tobias Ladehoff	RW	L	29	2014	Aalborg, Denmark
91	(Canada)	Troy Lajeunesse	C	L	29	2024	Dokis, Ontario, Canada
18	(Denmark)	William Lund	D	L	25	2024	Herning, Denmark
4	(Denmark)	Nikolai Nielsen	D	L	25	2020	Aalborg, Denmark
14	(Finland)	Joonas Niemelä	C	L	29	2024	Espoo, Finland
88	(Denmark)	Tor Ulrik Bolther Rasmussen	RW	L	22	2023	Aalborg, Denmark
39	(Denmark)	George Sørensen	G	L	31	2019	Herning, Denmark
8	(Denmark)	Nicolai Weichel	D	L	29	2024	Hørsholm, Denmark

== Historic results ==
- Season 1990/91: Ranked number 2.
- Season 1991/92: Ranked number 2.
- Season 1992/93: Ranked number 6.
- Season 1993/94: Ranked number 3.
- Season 1994/95: Ranked number 4.
- Season 1995/96: Ranked number 10.
- Season 1996/97: Ranked number 8.
- Season 1997/98: Ranked number 10.
- Season 1998/99: Ranked number 9.
- Season 1999/00: Ranked number 7.
- Season 2000/01: Ranked number 8.
- Season 2001/02: Ranked number 10.
- Season 2002/03: Ranked number 6.
- Season 2003/04: AaB won silvermedals losing to Esbjerg
- Season 2004/05: AaB won silvermedals losing to Herning Blue Fox
- Season 2005/06: AaB won the silvermedals in the 2005–06 season, losing to SønderjyskE in the final by 4 games to 2.
- Season 2006/07: AaB was eliminated in the quarterfinal losing to Odense Bulldogs
- Season 2008/09: AaB finished the regular season in 9th (only behind Frederikshavn by a goal difference of 1). But due to the bankruptcy of TOTEMPO HvIK were promoted up to 8th and qualified for the finals, they were eliminated in the quarterfinal by top seed and eventual silver medalists Herning Blue Fox
- Season 2009/10: AaB won the silver medals, losing the best of 7 final in 4 games to SønderjyskE
- Season 2010/11: Ranked number 4.
- Season 2011/12: Ranked number 5.
- Season 2012/13: Ranked number 3.
- Season 2013/14: Ranked number 3.
- Season 2014/15: Ranked number 8.
- Season 2015/16: Ranked number 8.
- Season 2016/17: Ranked number 1.
