= Odense Isstadion =

Ice hockey venue in Odense, Denmark

Coordinates: 55.3998°N 10.3496°E

Odense Isstadion Spar Nord Arena
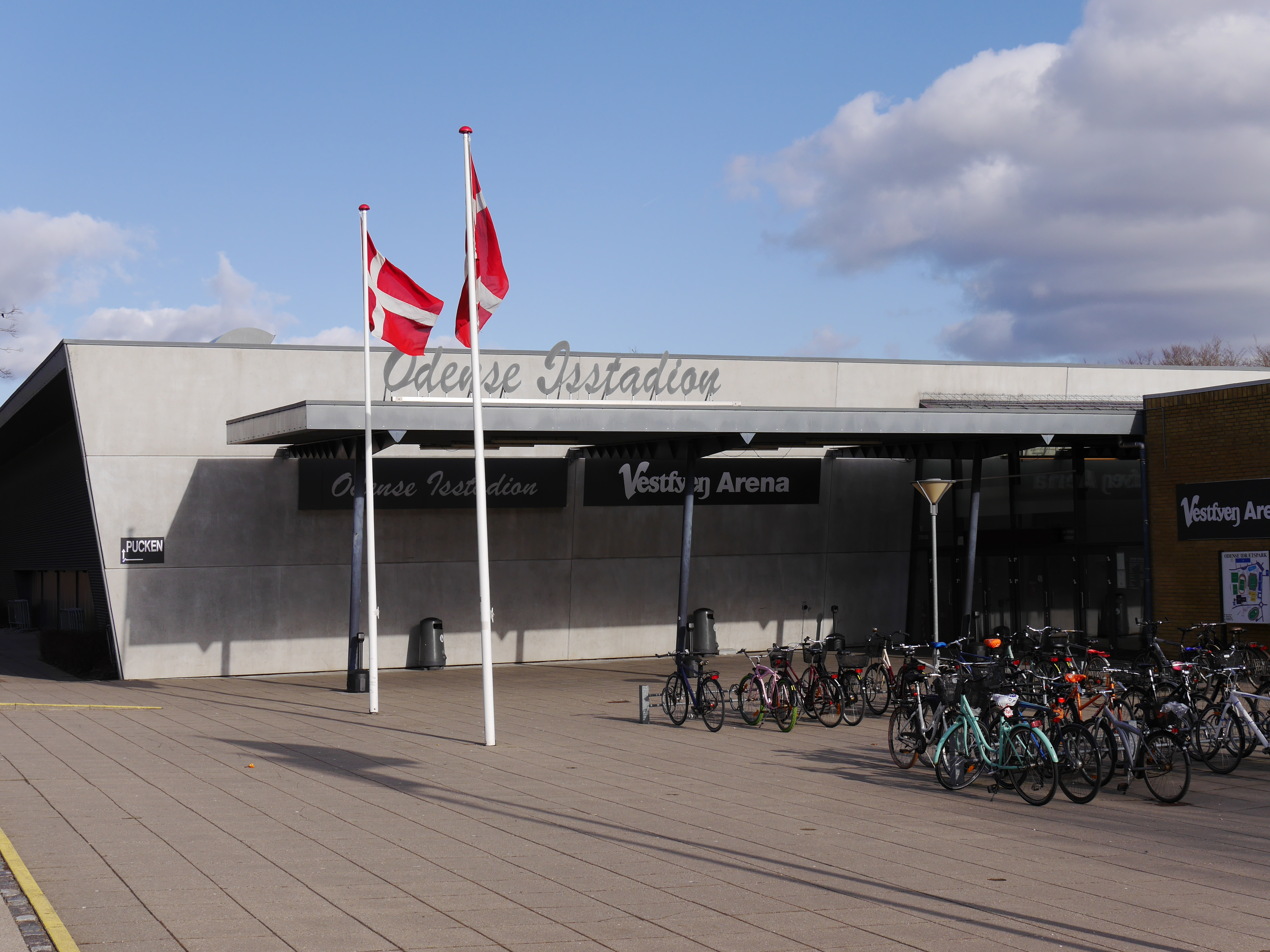
- Interactive map of Odense Isstadion; Spar Nord Arena
- Former names: VinMedKant Arena; Bryggeriet Vestfyen Arena; Albani Arena
- Location: Møllemarksvej 75; 5200 Odense V
- Operator: Odense Bulldogs
- Capacity: 3,280 (Seated: 1,024)
- Field size: 60 x 30 m
- Surface: Ice

Construction
- Built: 1999

Tenants
- Odense Bulldogs (1999–present); Odense Ishockey Klub (1978–present)

Odense Isstadion ('Odense Ice Stadium'), also known as Spar Nord Arena for sponsorship reasons, is an ice hockey arena in Bolbro, Odense, Denmark. It has previously been known as VinMedKant Arena, Bryggeriet Vestfyen Arena, and Albani Arena for sponsorship reasons. The arena is used for ice hockey as well as figure skating and serves as the home ice of the Odense Bulldogs and Odense Ishockey Klub (OIK). Odense Isstadion has a 3,280 spectator capacity, of which 1,024 are seated.

The venue also features a secondary hall, commonly noted as Odense Hal 1, which is used for ice hockey, figure skating, and curling. The secondary rink has a total capacity of 1,250 spectators, of which 350 are seated.

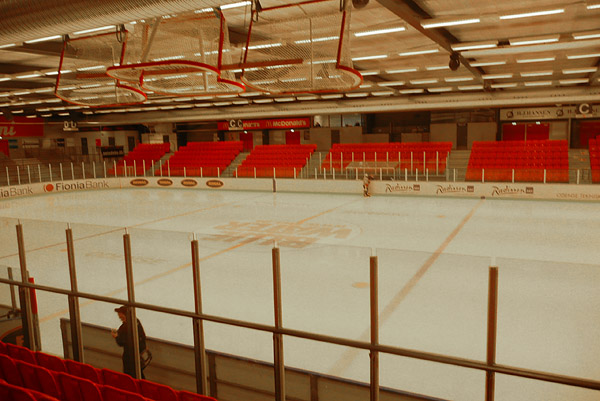
Interior of the Odense Isstadion primary rink
