= 2021–22 Metal Ligaen season =

2021–22 Metal Ligaen
- League: Metal Ligaen
- Sport: Ice hockey
- Duration: 31 August 2021 – 30 April 2022
- Teams: 9

Regular season
- Best record: Aalborg Pirates

Playoffs

Finals
- Champions: Aalborg Pirates (4th title)
- Runners-up: Rungsted Seier Capital

Metal Ligaen seasons
- ← 2020–21 2022–23 →

The 2021–22 Metal Ligaen season was the 65th season of the Metal Ligaen, the top level of ice hockey in Denmark. Nine teams participated in the league.

== Teams ==
Teams of the 2021–22 Metal Ligaen season

Teams licensed to play in the Metal Ligaen 2021–22

Team	Arena	Capacity
Aalborg Pirates	Gigantium Isarena	5,000
Esbjerg Energy	Granly Hockey Arena	4,200
Frederikshavn White Hawks	Scanel Hockey Arena	4,000
Herlev Eagles	DFDS Seaways Arena	1,740
Herning Blue Fox	KVIK Hockey Arena	4,105
Odense Bulldogs	Odense Isstadion	3,280
Rungsted Seier Capital	Saxo Bank Arena	2,460
Rødovre Mighty Bulls	Rødovre Skøjte Arena	3,600
SønderjyskE Ishockey	SE Arena	5,000

== Regular season ==
Pos	Team	Pld	W	OTW	OTL	L	GF	GA	GD	Pts	Qualification
1	Aalborg Pirates	45	25	6	3	11	165	104	+61	90	Qualification to play-offs
2	SønderjyskE	43	24	3	4	12	139	102	+37	82	Qualification to play-offs
3	Herning Blue Fox	45	21	8	5	11	152	119	+33	84	Qualification to play-offs
4	Frederikshavn White Hawks	46	21	6	6	13	125	103	+22	81	Qualification to play-offs
5	Esbjerg Energy	44	16	6	7	15	152	150	+2	67	Qualification to play-offs
6	Rungsted Seier Capital	45	14	8	7	16	135	141	−6	65	Qualification to play-offs
7	Odense Bulldogs	42	14	4	5	19	128	138	−10	55	Qualification to play-offs
8	Herlev Eagles	43	11	0	7	25	122	169	−47	40	Qualification to play-offs
9	Rødovre Mighty Bulls	47	7	6	3	31	90	182	−92	36	

Source: Metal Ligaen

== Results ==
Home	Away								
Home	Esbjerg	Fr.havn	Herlev	Herning	Odense	Rungsted	Rødovre	Sønderj.	Aalborg
Esbjerg Energy	–	4–5 OT; 1–2 OT; 6–2	6–4; Cancelled; 3–2	4–3 OT; 1–3; 2–5	7–1; 5–6; 6–3	7–6 GWS; 4–1; 3–2 OT	3–2; 2–3; 5–3	1–4; Cancelled; 2–6	0–6; 5–4; 5–0
Frederikshavn White Hawks	4–3 OT; 4–0; 1–2 GWS	–	5–4; 5–4; 4–0	1–4; 3–1; 4–1	1–2; 2–3; 2–5	3–1; 2–3 GWS; Cancelled	3–1; 6–2; 3–2	4–0; 1–3; 4–1	2–1; 4–5 GWS; 0–4
Herlev Eagles	3–5; 3–2; 3–5	1–5; 2–0; 2–3 GWS	–	4–5 OT; 2–5; 4–1	4–1; 3–4 GWS; 1–4	5–6 OT; 4–6; 2–4	3–1; 3–0; 8–3	2–4; 4–6; Cancelled	2–0; 2–5; Cancelled
Herning Blue Fox	5–4 OT; 4–3; 7–4	2–1 GWS; Cancelled; 1–6	5–1; 7–6 GWS; 7–5	–	1–0; Cancelled; 3–2	3–2 OT; 3–4 OT; 1–0	3–1; 3–0; 3–4	7–0; 3–1; 3–2	2–3; 5–4; 1–2 GWS
Odense Bulldogs	6–3; 3–5; 3–4 OT	1–6; 1–4; 3–4 OT	5–1; 5–2; 3–2	3–4; Cancelled; 1–8	–	2–1 GWS; 1–2 OT; Cancelled	6–0; 7–2; 8–1	0–1; Cancelled; 4–3 OT	5–8; 3–6; 2–4
Rungsted Seier Capital	4–3 OT; 3–6; 2–6	2–3; 4–1; 4–1	1–4; 5–4 OT; Cancelled	0–2; 2–3 GWS; 6–5 OT	3–2; 4–1; 0–5	–	5–3; 3–1; 5–2	3–6; 5–4 GWS; 6–3	2–3 OT; 1–2; 5–2
Rødovre Mighty Bulls	1–2; 3–1; 3–1	1–2; 3–0; 3–2 OT	3–5; Cancelled; 3–2 OT	4–3; 1–2 GWS; 1–4	3–4 OT; 4–3 GWS; 3–2 OT	4–3 GWS; 0–4; 3–6	–	2–1; 2–7; 1–5	1–9; 4–5; 3–2 OT
SønderjyskE Ishockey	4–3 GWS; Cancelled; 5–2	1–2 GWS; 2–1 GWS; 1–2	3–1; 4–1; 5–1	5–3; 3–2 GWS; 3–2	3–1; Cancelled; 2–4	4–0; 5–2; 4–1	6–0; 5–0; 3–0	–	2–6; 2–3; 3–2
Aalborg Pirates	5–4 GWS; Cancelled; 1–2 OT	2–1; 1–3; 3–1	1–2; 8–1; 6–3	2–3 GWS; 5–3; 3–1	5–2; Cancelled; 5–0	3–4; 3–1; 3–1	5–2; 2–1 OT; 7–0	4–2; 2–3; 3–2 GWS	–
OT - Overtime. GWS - Shootout.

== Play-offs ==
=== Bracket ===
Quarterfinals (best-of-7)
1	Aalborg Pirates	4
8	Herlev Eagles	0
2	SønderjyskE	3
7	Odense Bulldogs	4
(Pairings are reseeded after the first round)
3	Herning Blue Fox	1
6	Rungsted Seier Capital	4
4	Frederikshavn White Hawks	1
5	Esbjerg Energy	4

Semifinals (best-of-7)
1	Aalborg Pirates	4
7	Odense Bulldogs	0
5	Esbjerg Energy	3
6	Rungsted Seier Capital	4

Finals (best-of-7)
1	Aalborg Pirates	4
6	Rungsted Seier Capital	1
Bronze medal (best-of-3)
5	Esbjerg Energy	0
7	Odense Bulldogs	2

=== Quarterfinals ===
Aalborg Pirates – Herlev Eagles 4-0
11.03.2022	Aalborg Pirates	Herlev Eagles	4-1
13.03.2022	Herlev Eagles	Aalborg Pirates	1-5
16.03.2022	Aalborg Pirates	Herlev Eagles	3-1
18.03.2022	Herlev Eagles	Aalborg Pirates	0-1
Aalborg Pirates won the series 4–0.

SønderjyskE – Odense Bulldogs 3-4
11.03.2022	SønderjyskE	Odense Bulldogs	4-3
13.03.2022	Odense Bulldogs	SønderjyskE	3-0
15.03.2022	SønderjyskE	Odense Bulldogs	3-1
18.03.2022	Odense Bulldogs	SønderjyskE	4-3
20.03.2022	SønderjyskE	Odense Bulldogs	4-1
22.03.2022	Odense Bulldogs	SønderjyskE	3-1
24.03.2022	SønderjyskE	Odense Bulldogs	0-1 OT
Odense Bulldogs won the series 4–3.

Herning Blue Fox – Rungsted Seier Capital 1-4
11.03.2022	Herning Blue Fox	Rungsted Seier Capital	4-2
14.03.2022	Rungsted Seier Capital	Herning Blue Fox	5-1
16.03.2022	Herning Blue Fox	Rungsted Seier Capital	1-2
18.03.2022	Rungsted Seier Capital	Herning Blue Fox	3-2 OT
20.03.2022	Herning Blue Fox	Rungsted Seier Capital	1-2
Rungsted Seier Capital won the series 4–1.

Frederikshavn White Hawks – Esbjerg Energy 1-4
11.03.2022	Frederikshavn White Hawks	Esbjerg Energy	4-2
13.03.2022	Esbjerg Energy	Frederikshavn White Hawks	3-0
16.03.2022	Frederikshavn White Hawks	Esbjerg Energy	1-4
18.03.2022	Esbjerg Energy	Frederikshavn White Hawks	3-1
20.03.2022	Frederikshavn White Hawks	Esbjerg Energy	2-3
Esbjerg Energy won the series 4–1.

=== Semifinals ===
Aalborg Pirates – Odense Bulldogs 4-0
29.03.2022	Aalborg Pirates	Odense Bulldogs	3-2 OT
01.04.2022	Odense Bulldogs	Aalborg Pirates	1-2 OT
03.04.2022	Aalborg Pirates	Odense Bulldogs	6-0
04.04.2022	Odense Bulldogs	Aalborg Pirates	1-5
Aalborg Pirates won the series 4–0.

Esbjerg Energy – Rungsted Seier Capital 3-4
29.03.2022	Esbjerg Energy	Rungsted Seier Capital	4-3
01.04.2022	Rungsted Seier Capital	Esbjerg Energy	2-5
02.04.2022	Esbjerg Energy	Rungsted Seier Capital	1-2 OT
04.04.2022	Rungsted Seier Capital	Esbjerg Energy	2-5
06.04.2022	Esbjerg Energy	Rungsted Seier Capital	3-4 OT
08.04.2022	Rungsted Seier Capital	Esbjerg Energy	4-3 OT
10.04.2022	Esbjerg Energy	Rungsted Seier Capital	4-5 OT
Rungsted Seier Capital won the series 4–3.

=== Third place ===
15 April 2022; 19:00 UTC+2	Odense Bulldogs	6–5 (0–2, 3–0, 3–3)	Esbjerg Energy	Odense Isstadion, Odense; Attendance: 1,357

Game reference

Samu Perhonen
Goalies
Eamon McAdam
Referees:
Kenneth A. Nielsen
Rasmus Toppel
Linesmen:
Brian Kallesen
Frederik Sønderberg

	0–1	02:49 - Puffer (Grønvaldt)
	0–2	06:44 - Downing (Maegaard Scheel, Schulze)
Piipponen (Ehlers, Larsen) - 22:26	1–2
Piipponen (Larsen, Schou) - 33:01	2–2
Bach Nielsen (Topholt, Rafnsson) - 35:29	3–2
	3–3	41:49 - Ahlberg (Schultz)
	3–4	49:52 - King (Bjerrum)
	3–5	50:15 - Puffer (Maegaard Scheel, Grønvaldt)
Skvorcovs (Hardarson) - 50:24	4–5
Bach Nielsen (Topholt) - 52:42	5–5
Virtanen (Larsen, Sova) - 59:04	6–5

4 min
Penalties
2 min
33
Shots
24

16 April 2022; 15:00 UTC+2	Esbjerg Energy	4–5 (1–1, 1–2, 2–2)	Odense Bulldogs	Granly Hockey Arena, Esbjerg; Attendance: 1,433

Game reference

Thomas Lillie
Goalies
Samu Perhonen
Referees:
Martin Theiltoft Christensen
Rasmus Toppel
Linesmen:
Brian Kallesen
Albert Ankerstjerne

	0–1	04:29 - Auk (Hardarson, Skvorcovs)
Schultz (Nielsen) - 18:21	1–1
Kerbashian (Bjerrum) - 21:11	2–1
	2–2	30:51 - Larsen (Ehlers, Sova)
	2–3	38:13 - Tanus (Piipponen, Larsen)
Maegaard Scheel (Brown) - 40:17	3–3
	3–4	41:18 - Larsen (Hansen, Číp)
Puffer (Kerbashian) (PP1) - 52:16	4–4
	4–5	53:40 - Skvorcovs (Číp)

0 min
Penalties
4 min
31
Shots
37

Odense Bulldogs won 11–9 on aggregate

=== Finals ===
15 April 2022; 20:30 UTC+2	Aalborg Pirates	4–3 (2–1, 1–2, 1–0) score in the series: 1–0	Rungsted Seier Capital	Gigantium, Aalborg; Attendance: 4,245

Game reference

Georg Sørensen
Goalies
Ville Kolppanen
Referees:
Niclas B. Lundsgaard
Thomas Buchardt Andersen
Linesmen:
Niklas Knøsen
Emil Skov Dalsgaard

	0–1	02:07 - Madsen (Gustafsson, Rosenthal)
Romig (Spelling, Nielsen) - 03:23	1–1
Knudsen (Edmondson, Jul Korsgaard) - 12:07	2–1
	2–2	21:03 - Hardt (Persson, Andersson) (PP1)
	2–3	22:44 - Hardt (Persson, Jensen) (PP1)
Korsgaard (Panelin-Borg, Jakobsen) - 36:44	3–3
Bjorkstrand (Spelling, Koch) - 44:07	4–3

8 min
Penalties
6 min
25
Shots
21

17 April 2022; 20:00 UTC+2	Rungsted Seier Capital	3−1 (2–0, 0–0, 1–1) score in the series: 1–1	Aalborg Pirates	Bitcoin Arena, Rungsted; Attendance: 1,350

Game reference

Ville Kolppanen
Goalies
Georg Sørensen
Referees:
Mads Frandsen
Kenneth A. Nielsen
Linesmen:
Henrik Gandrup Haurum
Albert Ankerstjerne

Gustafsson - 11:36	1–0
Gustafsson (Rosenthal) - 12:13	2–0
Persson (Olsson) - 17:38	3–0
	3–1	18:08 - Korsgaard (Panelin-Borg)

0 min
Penalties
2 min
20
Shots
29

19 April 2022; 18:00 UTC+2	Aalborg Pirates	8–1 (2–1, 5–0, 1–0) score in the series: 2–1	Rungsted Seier Capital	Gigantium, Aalborg; Attendance: 4,313

Game reference

Georg Sørensen
Goalies
Ville Kolppanen
Referees:
Mads Frandsen
Martin Theiltoft Christensen
Linesmen:
Andreas Weise Krøyer
Fred Monnaie

	0–1	01:46 - Gracel (Hetta)
Spelling (Jul Korsgaard) - 14:36	1–1
Morin (Skinnars) - 15:54	2–1
Højbjerg (Knudsen) - 23:03	3–1
Skinnars - 29:41	4–1
Ladehoff (Morin, Edmondson) (PP1) - 34:56	5–1
Bjorkstrand (PP1) - 35:52	6–1
Carstensen (Spelling) (PP1) - 38:02	7–1
Steman (Skinnars, Morin) - 45:17	8–1

14 min
Penalties
16 min
31
Shots
22

22 April 2022; 19:30 UTC+2	Rungsted Seier Capital	2–4 (0–1, 2–1, 0–2) score in the series: 1–3	Aalborg Pirates	Bitcoin Arena, Rungsted; Attendance: 1,350

Game reference

Ville Kolppanen
Goalies
Georg Sørensen
Referees:
Mads Frandsen
Thomas Buchardt Andersen
Linesmen:
Henrik Gandrup Haurum
Niklas Knøsen

	0–1	06:34 - Kabanov (Carstensen, Jakobsen)
	0–2	04:46 - Jakobsen (Knudsen, Edmondson)
Anderson (PP1) - 12:54	1–2
Hardt (Anderson, Persson) (PP1) - 15:09	2–2
	2–3	56:52 - Edmondson (Korsgaard, Jakobsen)
	2–4	59:51 - Steman (Morin) (EN)

24 April 2022; 16:00 UTC+2	Aalborg Pirates	5–1 (2–1, 0–0, 3–0)	Rungsted Seier Capital	Gigantium, Aalborg; Attendance: 5,000

Game reference

Georg Sørensen
Goalies
Ville Kolppanen
Referees:
Mads Frandsen
Thomas Buchardt Andersen
Linesmen:
Henrik Gandrup Haurum
Niklas Knøsen

Spelling (Jakobsen, Carstensen) (PP1) - 04:41	1–0
Spelling (PP1) - 07:33	2–0
	2–1	10:13 - Persson (Hardt, Jensen)
Steman (Korsgaard) - 52:32	3–1
Knudsen (Jakobsen) (EN) - 56:14	4–1
Spelling (EN) - 59:03	5–1

4 min
Penalties
27 min
25
Shots
19

== Final rankings ==
Gold medal	Aalborg Pirates
Silver medal	Rungsted Seier Capital
Bronze medal	Odense Bulldogs
4	Esbjerg Energy
5	SønderjyskE
6	Herning Blue Fox
7	Frederikshavn White Hawks
8	Herlev Eagles
9	Rødovre Mighty Bulls
