= Sauvé (surname) =

Sauvé, Sauve
- Pronunciation: [sove]
- Language: French

Origin
- Language: French
- Meaning: To save or saved
- Region of origin: France and Canada

Other names
- Variant forms: Sova (french variant); Sauvat [sova] Sauvie

Sauvé is a French surname, most frequently as a French-Canadian surname. The name linked to early settlers such as Pierre Sauvé dit Laplante, who arrived in Quebec in the 17th century. Some North American descendants have altered forms of the surnames, including Sauvat and Sova. Notable people with the surname include:

- Arthur Sauvé (1874–1944)
- Bernard Sauvat (born 1941), French singer and songwriter
- Bob Sauvé (born 1955), Canadian ice hockey player
- Chris Sauvé, Canadian animator
- Christian Sauvé (1943-2023), French painter and professor
- Christopher Lee Sauvé (born 1979), Canadian pop artist
- Claudine Sauvé, Canadian cinematographer
- Clément Sauvé, Canadian comic book artist
- Craig Sauvé (born 1981), Canadian politician and musician
- Delpha Sauvé (1901–1956), Canadian politician
- Jean-François Sauvé (born 1960), Canadian ice hockey player
- Jean-Marc Sauvé (born 1949), French civil servant
- Jeanne Sauvé (1922–1993), Canadian politician and journalist
- Julie Sauvé (1952–2020), Canadian synchronized swimming coach
- Kassidy Sauvé (born 1996), Canadian ice hockey goaltender
- Louis-Philippe Sauvé, Canadian politician
- Louise Sauvé-Cuerrier (born 1926), Canadian educator and politician
- Matthew Sauvé (born 1978), Canadian actor and producer
- Marie Sauvet (born 1953), French musician
- Maurice Sauvé (1923–1992), Canadian economist, politician, cabinet minister and businessman
- Maxime Sauvé (born 1990), Canadian ice hockey player
- Mégane Sauvé (born 1998), Canadian soccer player
- Monique Sauvé, Canadian politician
- Patrice Sauvé, Canadian film and television director
- Paul Sauvé (1907–1960), Canadian politician
- Paul Sauvé (curler) (1939–2020), Canadian curler
- Philippe Sauvé (born 1980), American ice hockey player
- Richard Sauvé (born 1952), Canadian social activist
- Uma Gahd (born Ryan Sauvé), Canadian drag queen
- Sebastian Sauve (born 1987), American model
- Susan Sauvé Meyer (born 1960), Canadian philosopher
- Yann Sauvé (born 1990), Canadian ice hockey player

== See also ==
- Saint Sauve
- Charlotte de Sauve
- Sauvé station
- Bourassa-Sauvé
- Sauvé (provincial electoral district)
- Sauvé's Crevasse
- Sauvie Island
- Sauvé v Canada (Chief Electoral Officer)
- Sova (surname)
