= 2008 Denmark Open darts =

Denmark Open

Tournament information
- Dates: 2008
- Country: Denmark
- Organisation(s): BDO, WDF, DDU
- Winner's share: 10,000 DKK

Champion(s)
- (Poland) Krzysztof Ratajski

2008 Denmark Open is a darts tournament, which took place in Denmark in 2008.

== Results ==
=== Last 32 ===
Final 32
(Poland) | Krzysztof Ratajski
(England) | Steve O'Donnell
(Hungary) | Nandor Bezzeg
(Denmark) | Bent Gregersen
(Finland) | Marko Kantele
(Belgium) | Dirk Hespeels
(Denmark) | Vladimir Andersen
(Northern Ireland) | Michael Blair
(Belgium) | Geert De Vos
(Belgium) | Ronny Huybrechts
(Republic of Ireland) | Martin McCloskey
(England) | Stephen Bunting
(England) | Alan Norris
(Denmark) | Rene Jørgensen
(England) | Darryl Fitton
(Netherlands) | Daniel Brouwer
(Netherlands) | Fabian Roosenbrand
(Wales) | Gareth Holt
(Finland) | Jarkko Komula
(Scotland) | John Henderson
(Netherlands) | Patrick Loos
(England) | James Wilson
(Slovenia) | Gregor Gorjup
(Sweden) | Markus Korhonen
(Netherlands) | Bobby Biemans
(England) | Dave Prins
(Denmark) | Tonny Sørensen
(Belgium) | Patrick Bulen
(Germany) | Kevin Münch
(Denmark) | Ole Jørgensen
(Netherlands) | Joey ten Berge
(Scotland) | Paul Hanvidge

Final 16
(Poland) | Krzysztof Ratajski
(Hungary) | Nandor Bezzeg
(Finland) | Marko Kantele
(Denmark) | Vladimir Andersen
(Belgium) | Geert De Vos
(Republic of Ireland) | Martin McCloskey
(England) | Alan Norris
(England) | Darryl Fitton
(Netherlands) | Fabian Roosenbrand
(Finland) | Jarkko Komula
(Netherlands) | Patrick Loos
(Slovenia) | Gregor Gorjup
(Netherlands) | Bobby Biemans
(Denmark) | Tonny Sørensen
(Germany) | Kevin Münch
(Netherlands) | Joey ten Berge

Quarter-finals
(Poland) | Krzysztof Ratajski
(Finland) | Marko Kantele
(Belgium) | Geert De Vos
(England) | Alan Norris
(Netherlands) | Fabian Roosenbrand
(Netherlands) | Patrick Loos
(Netherlands) | Bobby Biemans
(Germany) | Kevin Münch

Semi-finals
(Poland) | Krzysztof Ratajski
(Belgium) | Geert De Vos
(Netherlands) | Fabian Roosenbrand
(Netherlands) | Bobby Biemans

Final
(Poland) | Krzysztof Ratajski
(Netherlands) | Fabian Roosenbrand
