= Sova =

Sova may refer to:

- 2647 Sova, a main-belt asteroid
- Slovenian Intelligence and Security Agency, the main civilian intelligence service in Slovenia
- Sova, Iran, a village in Mazandaran Province, Iran
- Sova (river), a river in Perm Krai, Russia
- Sova (surname), a list of people with the surname

== See also ==
- SOVA (disambiguation)
