= Sowa (surname) =

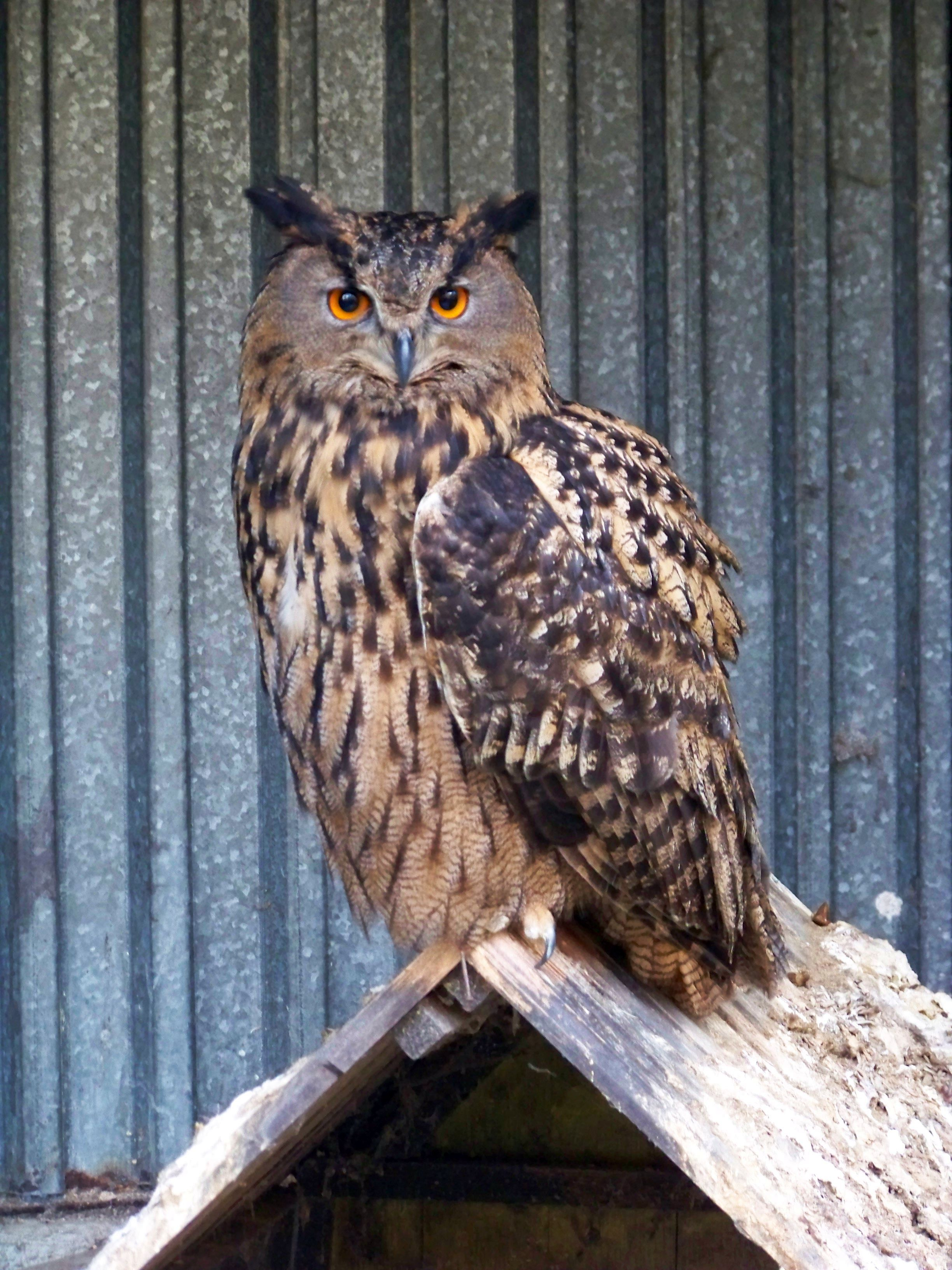

Origin
- Languages: Polish; Japanese
- Meaning: Polish/Slavic: Owl; Japanese: 曽和; Other: Unknown
- Region of origin: Poland, Central/Eastern Europe; Ghana; Japan

Other names
- Variant forms: Sova (Czech, other Slavic form; Yiddish: סאָווע Sóve)

Sowa (Polish pronunciation: [ˈsɔva]) is a spelling or Latin transcription of multiple surnames including German, Polish, Ghanaian, and Japanese.

== Etymology ==
=== Europe ===
Among individuals of European origin, the surname Sowa is derived from the slawic noun "sowa" (owl). In some cases, it may be an alternative spelling of the surname Sova, which is a Ukrainian, Czech, Belarusian, Slovak and Russian cognate. Both are derived from Proto-Slavic *sova.

Polish name expert Kazimierz Rymut mentions the name in his book Nazwiska Polaków (The Surnames of Poles). Rymut says the name appears in records as early as 1404 and comes from the noun sowa, which means "owl". Fred Hoffman, author of Polish Surnames, explains that a common practice in the early days of surname adoption was its bestowal upon people as a nickname because of their connection to the meaning behind the name, which was, in this case, an owl.

=== Other countries ===
Unrelated homonymous surnames are also found in Ghana and Japan.

== Notable people ==
- Adam Sowa (born 1957), Polish general
- Adan Sowa (born 1954), Argentine golf player
- Alexandre Sowa (1927–2017), French racing cyclist
- Arkadiusz Sowa (born 1979), Polish marathon runner
- Armin Sowa (born 1959), German basketball player
- Charles Sowa (1933–2013), Luxembourgish race walker and coach
- François Sowa (born 1937), Luxembourgish boxer
- Hiroshi Sowa (born 1956), Japanese football player and manager
- John F. Sowa (born 1940), American computer scientist
- Marc Sowa (born 1963), Luxembourgish racewalker
- Marzena Sowa (born 1979), Polish cartoonist
- Michael Sowa (born 1945), German artist
- Richart Sowa, British artist and builder of Spiral Island
- Theo Sowa (born 1957), Ghanaian writer
- Theodosius Okan Sowa (1918–2003), Ghanaian diplomat

== See also ==
- Sova (surname)
