= Sowa =

Sowa may refer to:

== Places ==
- Sowa, Botswana, a town in Botswana, Africa also known as the home of Botash
- SoWa, a district in Boston, Massachusetts, United States
- South Waterfront or SoWa, district in South Portland, Oregon, United States
- Sowa, Ibaraki, a town in Sashima District, Ibaraki, Japan.

== Other ==
- Sowa (surname)
- Sowa language, extinct language of Vanuatu
