= Durham College =

Public college in Oshawa and Whitby, Canada

Durham College of Applied Arts and Technology
- Motto: Together, we're leading the way
- Type: Public college
- Established: 1967; 59 years ago
- Academic affiliations: ACCC; AUCC; CBIE
- President: Elaine Popp
- Students: More than 13,000 (2025: 10,682 FTEs)
- Location: Oshawa, Ontario, Canada; 43°56′38″N 78°53′49″W
- Campus: Urban
- Colours: Black & green
- Nickname: Lords
- Sporting affiliations: CCAA – OCAA
- Mascot: Lou
- Website: www.durhamcollege.ca

Durham College is a public college in Ontario, Canada, with two main campuses in Oshawa and Whitby. Durham College offers over 145 academic programs, including six bachelor degrees and eleven apprenticeship programs, to around 13,700 full-time students.

== History ==
Durham College, main campus in Oshawa

The college opened on September 18, 1967, in Oshawa, with 16 portable classrooms, 14 staff and 205 students. It offered courses in applied arts, business and technology. The college soon added courses in health sciences and adult training. By 1977, enrolment had grown to 1,250 students.

In 1993, the college opened a secondary campus in Whitby, Ontario. It began to offer skilled trades and apprenticeship programs through the campus's Skills Training Centre.

In the early 2000s, the college established partnerships with York and Trent universities which allowed students to access university courses from the Durham College Oshawa campus. In 2003, a similar partnership was formed with Ontario Tech University. The college expanded its program offerings to include over 100 full-time programs. Enrolment grew to over 7,100 students.

In 2018, Durham College completed construction on a new building known as the Centre for Collaborative Education (CFCE). It houses several classrooms for health programs and the Suswaaning Endaajig: First Peoples Indigenous Centre.

The Ontario Power Generation Centre for Skilled Trades and Technology (CSTT), located at the Whitby campus, opened in 2022 is home to numerous labs and shops. The facility allowed the college to increase its industrial skilled trades training capacity in Whitby by 750 students.

In October 2022 it was announced that the college had acquired naming rights to the Oshawa GO Station, located 30 minutes away from the college's main campus by bus (8.2 km), for an undisclosed sum.

== Student Life ==
Both campuses feature on-campus housing for students, sports and recreational activities, student services, a campus store, dining options, transportation and parking.

The college features a 73,000-square-foot (6,800 m^{2}) campus library, which has four floors of learning space and a rotunda housing a periodicals collection. Other learning spaces include the computer learning commons, student services building, student centre, and a variety of other study spaces.

Durham College offers first-year information, academic support resources, career services, student testing/in-class accommodations with approved documentation through the Access & Support Centre (ASC), and Student Academic Learning Services (SALS). The student life office and Student Association offer events and programs for students of all years. Student-run media includes The Chronicle online student newspaper, and Riot student radio. The college offers a variety of athletic programs.

== Partnerships ==
Durham College shares its Oshawa campus and facilities like the library and athletic facilities with Ontario Tech University.

== Programs ==
The college offers a wide range of programs in various disciplines, including business, information technology, media, art, design, science, skilled trades, criminal justice, emergency services, health, social community services and engineering technology. Additionally, it administers part-time programs, micro-credentials, and professional development courses, available both online or in-person.

=== Campuses and locations ===
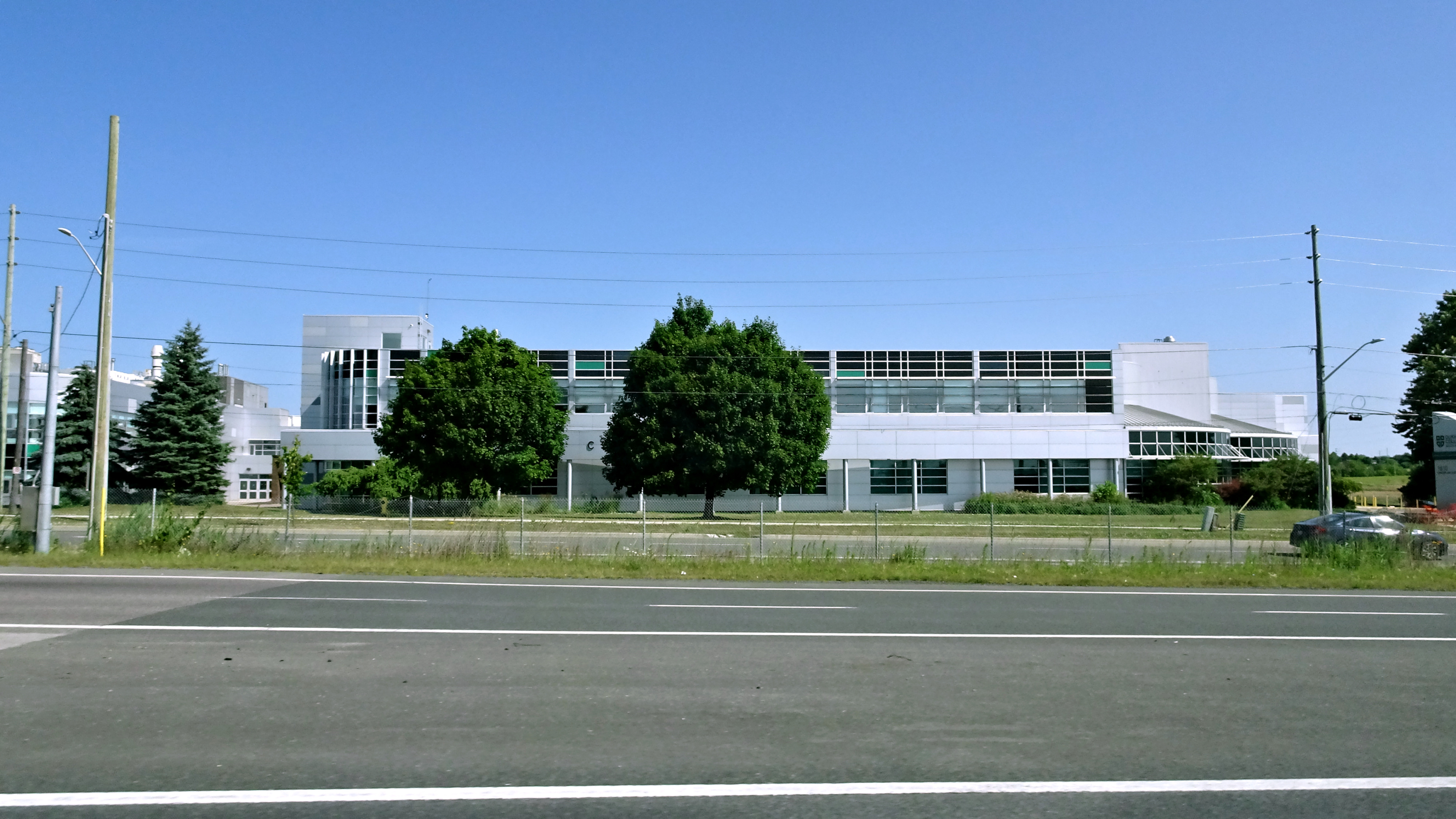
Durham College, Whitby Campus

Durham College has two main campuses, located in Oshawa and Whitby, Ontario.

== Presidents ==
- Gordon Willey (1967-1980)
- Mel Garland (1980-1988)
- Gary Polonsky (1988-2006)
- Leah Myers (2006-2008)
- Don Lovisa (2009–2024)
- Elaine Popp (2024–present)

== Notable people ==
- Brandon Nolan - retired hockey player, vice-president of Ted Nolan Foundation.
- Madeh Piryonesi, Kurdish-Canadian writer and engineer (current faculty)
- Fred Upshaw - former president of OPSEU, which represents 110,000 Ontario public sector workers; deceased.
- Patricia O'Connor - founding member of the Canadian Association of Aero-medical Transport. Recipient of the Order of Canada in 2007 and recipient of the Premier's Award in 2009.
- Lauren Toyota, vegan cookbook author and blogger; former Canadian television personality
- Paul Vessey - COO of Visa USA and recipient of the Premier's Award in 2000.
- Tyler Boyco - filmmaker and artist popular for making a Robin Williams portrait that went viral in 2014.
- Sheldon McIntosh - famous drag queen "Tynomi Banks", who starred on the first season of Canada's Drag Race.
- Matthew Sauvé - Actor and producer.

== Sports Teams ==
Varsity sports at Durham include:

- Men's and women's golf
- Men's baseball
- Women's softball
- Men's and women's volleyball
- Men's and women's basketball
- Men’s and women’s soccer
- Men’s and women’s rugby
- Mixed Esports

Teams compete as the "Durham Lords".

== Awards ==
The college was selected as one of Toronto's top employers in 2025.

== See also ==
- Higher education in Ontario
- List of colleges in Ontario
- Ontario Tech University
