= Tommy James Murphy =

Canadian actor, screenwriter and producer (born 1987)

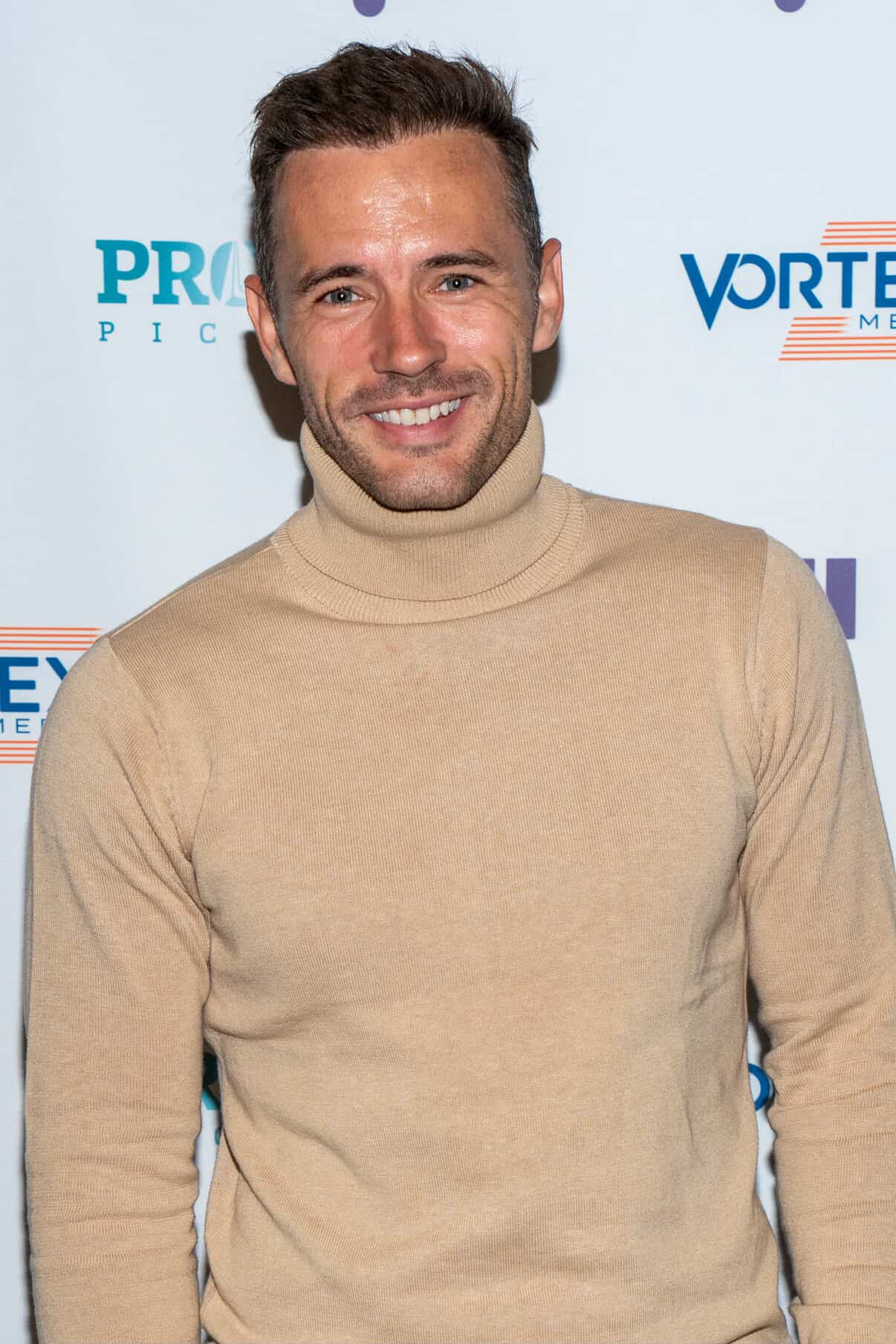
- Murphy in 2022
- Born: June 25, 1987 (age 38); Toronto, Canada
- Occupations: Actor; screenwriter; producer
- Years active: 2013–present
- Known for: Disrepair; Little Women Big League

Tommy James Murphy is a Canadian actor, screenwriter and producer. He stars in and wrote the Bell Fibe TV1 miniseries Disrepair (2025) and appears as a lead in the TV1 comedy Little Women, Big League (2025). His feature work includes the Canadian crime drama Recall (2018), for which he is credited as a screenwriter and appeared on screen, as well as roles in Entropic (2019) and Isthmus (2021).

== Early life ==
Murphy was born June 25, 1987 in Toronto.

== Career ==
Murphy has television credits on series including Lucky 7 and Covert Affairs, and appears in the anthology film An Assortment of Christmas Tales in No Particular Order.

In March 2024, Deadline reported that Bell Canada’s community channel TV1 had commissioned the limited series Disrepair, with Matthew Sauvé starring alongside Murphy. Additional casting and production details were covered by BlackFilmAndTV in March 2025, noting Murphy’s role and the series’ creative team. Disrepair premiered on TV1 on 29 January 2025; TV, eh? identifies Murphy as the writer of the series and names him among the producers. The show’s official page on Bell Fibe TV1 lists Murphy among the lead cast and producers.

Murphy subsequently starred in the Bell Fibe TV1 comedy Little Women, Big League, which premiered on 13 March 2025. Coverage ahead of launch highlighted Murphy’s lead role; a first-look synopsis named his character Ty Wolfe O’Shea.

As a screenwriter, Murphy is credited on the feature film Recall, which had its streaming release on 3 July 2018 and in which he also co-starred as Dale. His later feature appearances include Entropic (as Luke) and Isthmus (as Tommy). He also had a (uncredited) appearance in xXx: Return of Xander Cage (2017).

== Filmography ==
=== Film ===
Year	Title	Role	Notes	Ref(s)
2015	Groupies	Rocky	Short	"Tommy James Murphy — Filmography". Rotten Tomatoes.
2016	Next Stop	Tommy	Short	"Tommy James Murphy — Filmography". Rotten Tomatoes.
2017	xXx: Return of Xander Cage	Hot Guy	Uncredited	
2018	Recall	Dale	Also screenwriter	
2019	Entropic	Luke	Feature	
2019	An Assortment of Christmas Tales in No Particular Order	—	Anthology feature	
2021	Isthmus	Tommy	Feature	

=== Television ===
Year	Title	Role	Notes	Ref(s)
2013	Lucky 7	—	Episodic appearance	
2013–2014	Covert Affairs	—	Episodic appearance	
2025	Disrepair	James Thomas	Also writer and producer; 4-episode miniseries (TV1)	
2025	Little Women, Big League	Ty Wolfe O’Shea	Also producer (TV1)	

=== Other credits ===
- 11.22.63 (2016) – stand-in/photodouble credit (TV Guide listing).
