= Julian Jakobsen =

Danish professional ice hockey winger (born 1987)

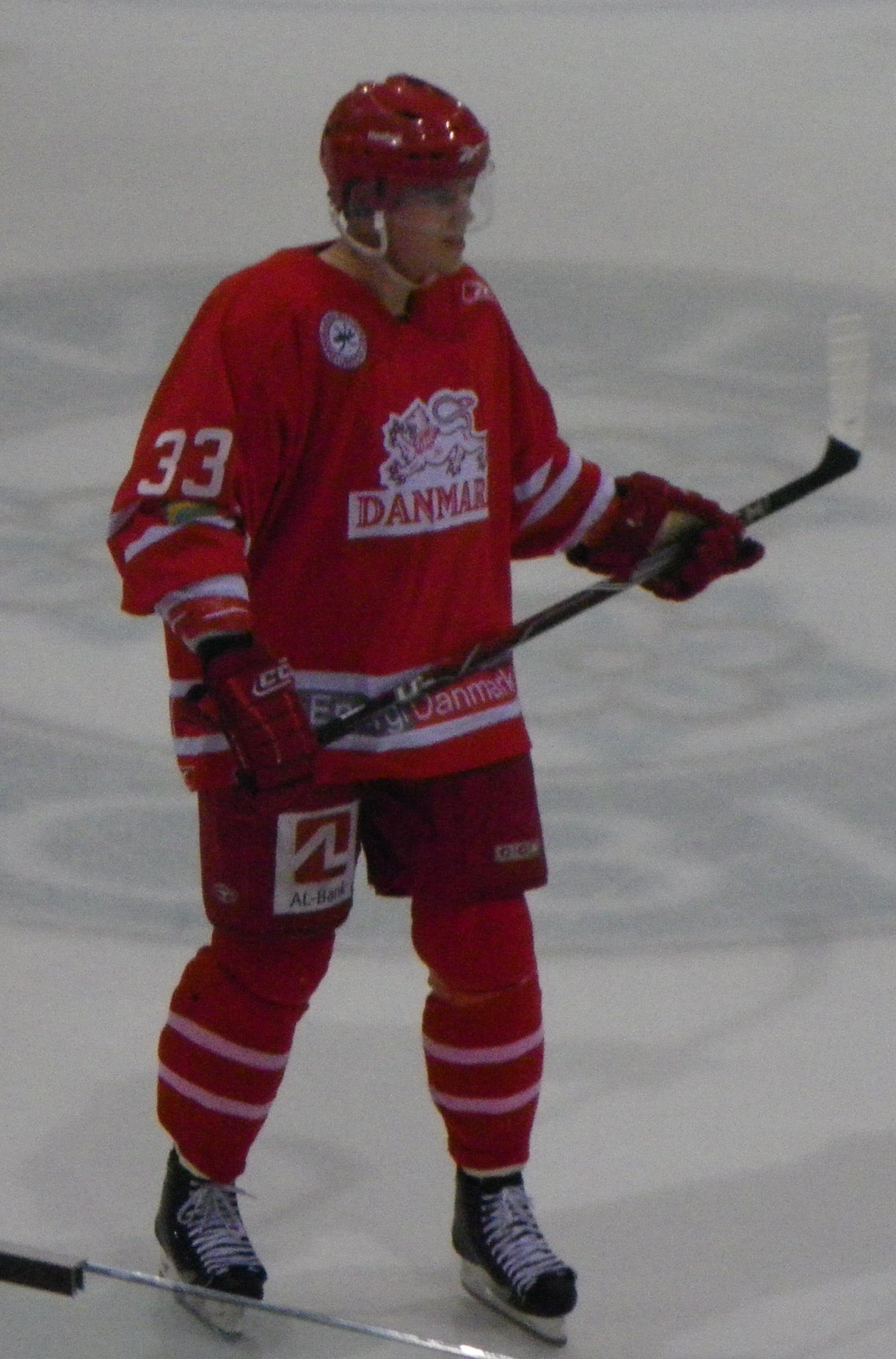
- Born: 11 April 1987 (age 38) Aalborg, Denmark
- Height: 6 ft 0 in (183 cm)
- Weight: 192 lb (87 kg; 13 st 10 lb)
- Position: Centre
- Shoots: Left
- Metal team Former teams: Aalborg Pirates; Odense Bulldogs; Södertälje SK; Hamburg Freezers
- National team: Denmark
- Playing career: 2004–present

Julian Jakobsen (born 11 April 1987) is a Danish professional ice hockey winger who currently plays as Captain for The Aalborg Pirates of Metal Ligaen (DEN). His sister, Josefine Jakobsen, plays professionally for Djurgårdens IF and has been named Danish Women's Player of the Year twice.

== Career statistics ==
=== Regular season and playoffs ===
			Regular season					Playoffs
Season	Team	League	GP	G	A	Pts	PIM	GP	G	A	Pts	PIM
2004–05	AaB Ishockey	DEN U20	29	29	27	56	98	—	—	—	—	—
2004–05	AaB Ishockey	DEN	7	0	0	0	0	1	0	0	0	0
2004–05	AaB Ishockey II	DEN.2	20	11	11	22	62	—	—	—	—	—
2005–06	AaB Ishockey	DEN U20	22	23	37	60	67	—	—	—	—	—
2005–06	AaB Ishockey	DEN	29	4	3	7	6	17	3	4	7	12
2005–06	AaB Ishockey II	DEN.2	9	6	9	15	24	—	—	—	—	—
2006–07	Aalborg Pirates	DEN	33	0	1	1	10	17	0	0	0	2
2006–07	AaB Ishockey II	DEN.2	1	1	0	1	2	—	—	—	—	—
2007–08	Odense Bulldogs	DEN	41	13	25	38	46	11	3	7	10	6
2008–09	Odense Bulldogs	DEN	35	7	23	30	36	11	2	9	11	12
2009–10	Södertälje SK	J20	2	0	3	3	4	—	—	—	—	—
2009–10	Södertälje SK	SEL	41	1	6	7	27	—	—	—	—	—
2010–11	Södertälje SK	SEL	54	3	5	8	12	—	—	—	—	—
2010–11	Tingsryd AIF	Allsv	1	0	1	1	0	—	—	—	—	—
2011–12	Södertälje SK	Allsv	52	12	19	31	65	—	—	—	—	—
2012–13	Hamburg Freezers	DEL	52	9	14	23	32	6	2	0	2	10
2013–14	Hamburg Freezers	DEL	51	8	13	21	53	12	2	3	5	4
2014–15	Hamburg Freezers	DEL	47	4	13	17	59	7	0	2	2	0
2015–16	Hamburg Freezers	DEL	48	4	12	16	76	—	—	—	—	—
2016–17	Aalborg Pirates	DEN	44	8	34	42	42	7	0	4	4	43
2017–18	Aalborg Pirates	DEN	50	12	39	51	77	17	5	11	16	16
2018–19	Aalborg Pirates	DEN	31	11	22	33	42	11	3	10	13	12
2019–20	Aalborg Pirates	DEN	47	11	22	33	54	—	—	—	—	—
2020–21	Aalborg Pirates	DEN	46	15	20	35	40	15	9	6	15	12
2021–22	Aalborg Pirates	DEN	36	19	16	35	55	13	3	12	15	4
DEN totals			399	100	205	305	408	120	28	62	91	119
SEL totals			95	4	11	15	39	—	—	—	—	—
DEL totals			198	25	52	77	220	25	4	5	9	14

=== International ===
Year	Team	Event	GP	G	A	Pts	PIM
2005	Denmark	WJC18	6	1	2	3	4
2006	Denmark	WJC D1	5	3	1	4	8
2007	Denmark	WJC D1	5	2	3	5	2
2009	Denmark	OGQ	3	0	0	0	0
2009	Denmark	WC	6	2	1	3	2
2010	Denmark	WC	7	1	1	2	4
2011	Denmark	WC	6	0	5	5	4
2012	Denmark	WC	7	0	0	0	12
2013	Denmark	OGQ	3	1	1	2	0
2013	Denmark	WC	7	0	0	0	6
2014	Denmark	WC	5	0	2	2	2
2015	Denmark	WC	7	2	1	3	4
2017	Denmark	WC	7	0	3	3	6
2018	Denmark	WC	7	0	0	0	4
2019	Denmark	WC	7	0	1	1	2
2021	Denmark	WC	7	1	1	2	2
2021	Denmark	OGQ	3	0	2	2	2
2022	Denmark	OG	5	1	2	3	2
2022	Denmark	WC	7	2	0	2	2
Junior totals			16	6	6	12	14
Senior totals			94	10	20	30	54
