= SOVA =

SOVA may refer to one of the following:

- KIAC School of Visual Arts, a Canadian art school whose acronym is SOVA
- Slovenska Obveščevalno-Varnostna Agencija, the Slovenian Intelligence and Security Agency, the central government intelligence agency in Slovenia
- SOVA: Smithsonian Online Virtual Archives at (Smithsonian Institution)
- Soft output Viterbi algorithm, a variant of the Viterbi algorithm
- SOVA, a solar monitor used on the 1992 European Retrievable Carrier (EURECA) satellite
- SOVA Center, a human rights NGO in Russia

== See also ==
- Sova (disambiguation)
