= Rasmus Korhonen =

Finnish ice hockey player (born 2002)

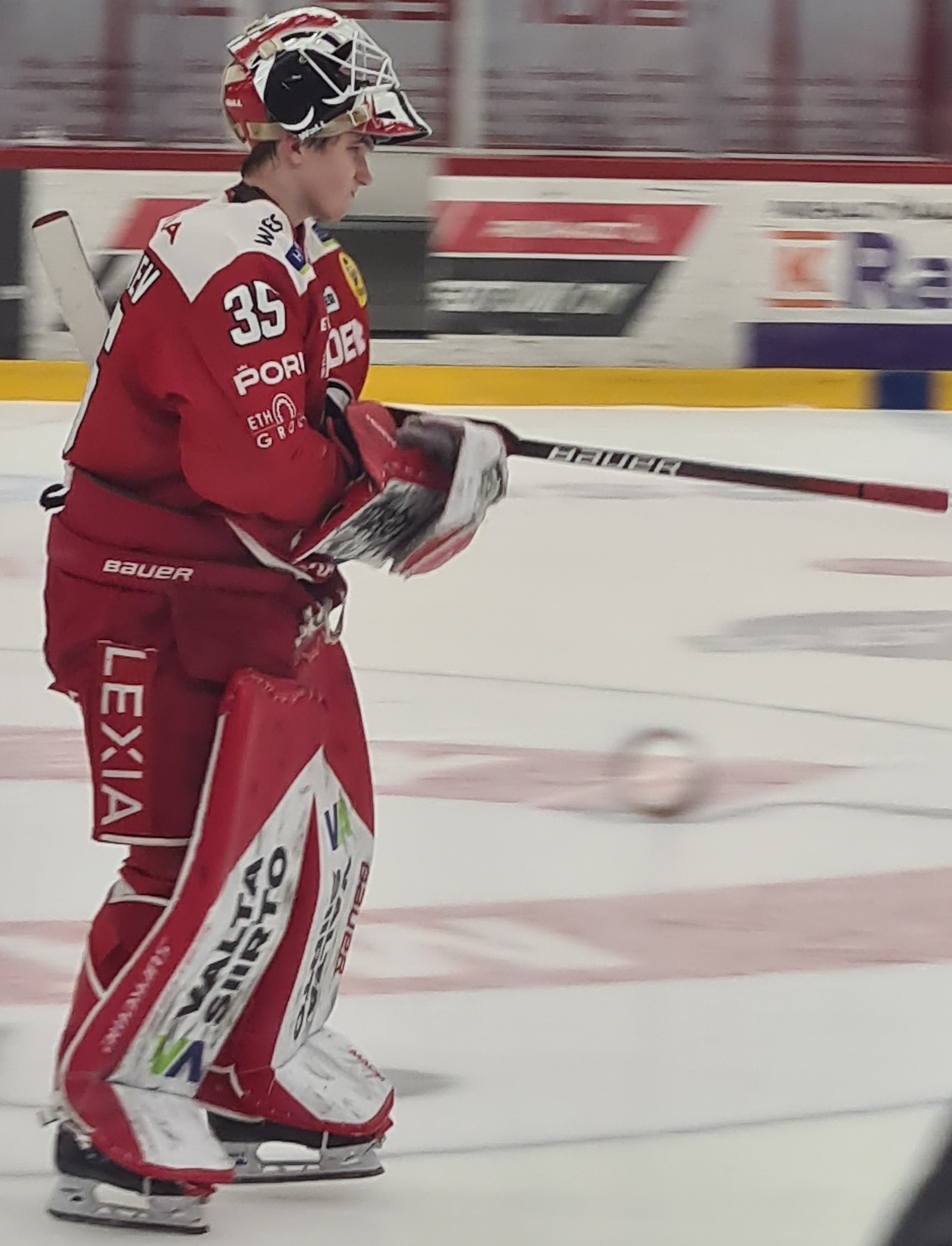
- Rasmus Korhonen in 2023
- Born: 22 October 2002 (age 23) Oulu, Finland
- Height: 195 cm (6 ft 5 in)
- Weight: 91 kg (201 lb; 14 st 5 lb)
- Position: Goaltender
- Catches: Left
- Allsvenskan team Former teams: Västerås IK; Porin Ässät; Sport; Tucson Roadrunners; Jukurit
- NHL draft: 122nd overall, 2021; Arizona Coyotes
- Playing career: 2020–present

Rasmus Korhonen (born 22 October 2002) is a Finnish professional ice hockey goaltender who plays for Västerås IK in the HockeyAllsvenskan. He was selected 122nd overall in the 2020 NHL entry draft by the Arizona Coyotes.

== Playing career ==
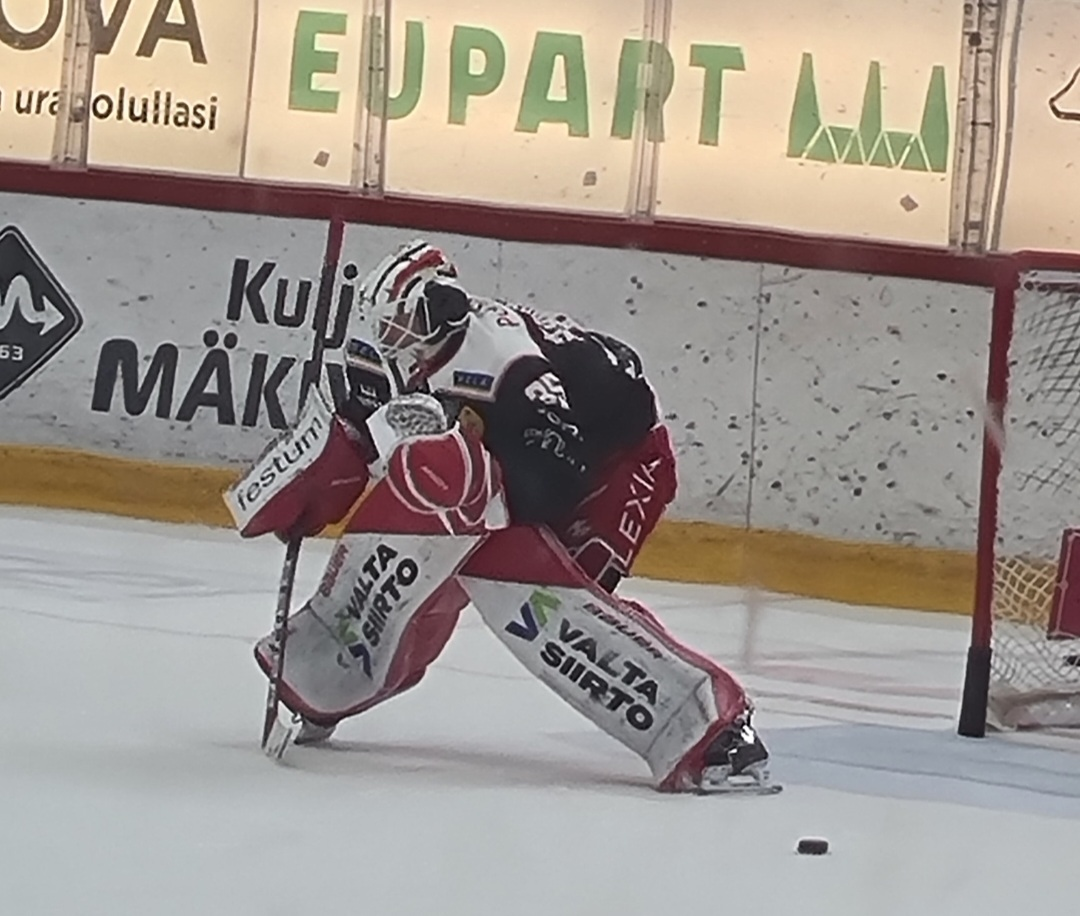
Rasmus Korhonen 15 October 2022

In 2020, Korhonen played his first men's game for Ässät, against TPS. Straight after the first faceoff, TPS's Markus Nurmi shot the puck into the net, breaking the Liiga record for the fastest goal.

On 10 May 2021, Korhonen signed a two-year contract with Ässät of the Finnish Liiga. On 29 June, Korhonen was sent to Kokkolan Hermes of the Finnish Mestis on a one-year loan. Following completion of the 2021–22 season, with Hermes and a short loan stint with Vaasan Sport, Korhonen joined the Arizona Coyotes' AHL affiliate, the Tucson Roadrunners, on a tryout for the remainder of the North American season on 4 April 2022. Korhonen continued to play with Ässät for the 2022–23 Liiga season. Korhonen served as the backup goalie to Niklas Rubin while he also played games for the U20 team.

Korhonen signed a one-year contract with Jukurit for the 2023–24 Liiga season.

== Personal life ==
Korhonen is the son of a retired Finnish goaltender Markus Korhonen.
