= Nichlas Hardt =

Danish ice hockey player

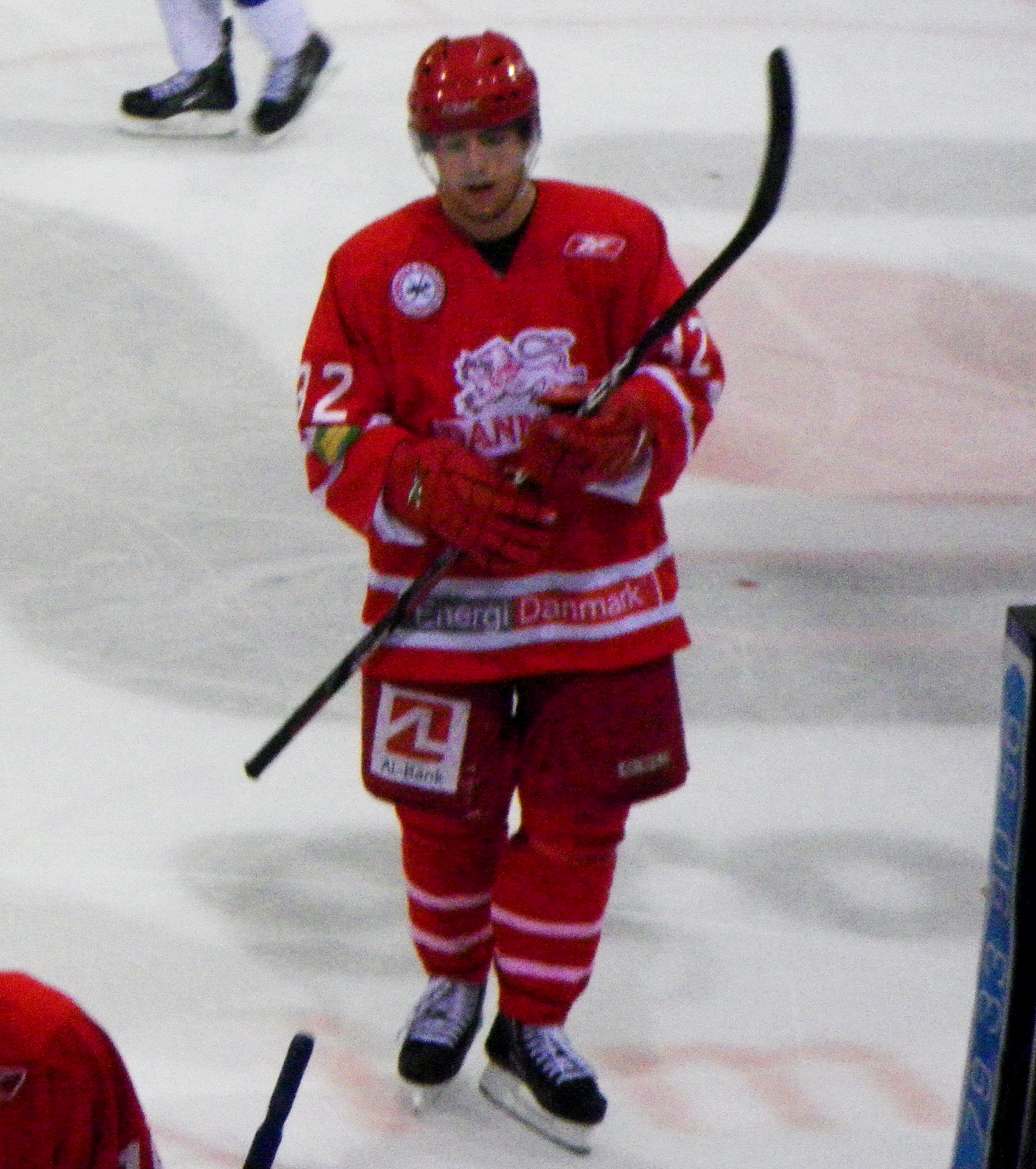
- Born: July 6, 1988 (age 37) Rødovre, Denmark
- Height: 5 ft 10 in (178 cm)
- Weight: 176 lb (80 kg; 12 st 8 lb)
- Position: Forward
- Shot: Left
- Played for: Herlev Hornets; Tappara; Malmö Redhawks; Jokerit; Linköpings HC
- National team: Denmark
- Playing career: 2004–2022

Nichlas Hardt (born 6 July 1988) is a Danish professional ice hockey Forward who currently plays for the Linköpings HC of the Swedish Hockey League (SHL).

== Playing career ==
Hardt was selected Rookie of the Year in the Danish ice hockey league in 2007, where he represented the Herlev Hornets. Despite his relatively small stature, Hardt is known for his physical style of play, throwing many hits while being a relentless forechecker.

He became the first Danish player to play in the top Finnish league, the SM-liiga, when he joined Tappara towards the end of the 2007–08 season. In the playoffs, he enjoyed considerable success for Tappara, registering 4 goals and 3 assists in 11 games as Tappara went on to finish third in the playoffs and win the bronze medals.

On 16 April 2014, Hardt left Kontinental Hockey League bound Jokerit after three seasons and signed a contract with SHL club, Linköpings HC for the 2014–15 season.

== International play ==
He represented Denmark at the 2008 World Junior Ice Hockey Championships and again at the 2008 Men's World Ice Hockey Championships and 2010 Men's World Ice Hockey Championships.

== Career statistics ==
			Regular season					Playoffs
Season	Team	League	GP	G	A	Pts	PIM	GP	G	A	Pts	PIM
2004–05	Rødovre U20	Denmark U20	27	28	22	50	57	—	—	—	—	—
2004–05	Rødovre SIK	Denmark2	13	9	9	18	8	—	—	—	—	—
2005–06	Herlev U20	Denmark U20	19	19	33	52	30	2	0	1	1	4
2005–06	Herlev II	Denmark2	4	3	3	6	2	—	—	—	—	—
2005–06	Herlev Hornets	Denmark	35	2	4	6	18	—	—	—	—	—
2006–07	Herlev/Rungsted U20	Denmark U20	10	9	17	26	10	—	—	—	—	—
2006–07	Herlev/Rungsted	Denmark2	2	1	0	1	6	—	—	—	—	—
2006–07	Herlev Hornets	Denmark	33	13	14	27	28	—	—	—	—	—
2007–08	Herlev/KSF U20	Denmark U20	1	0	1	1	0	—	—	—	—	—
2007–08	Herlev Hornets	Denmark	33	9	25	34	44	—	—	—	—	—
2007–08	Tappara	SM-liiga	6	1	0	1	2	11	4	3	7	2
2008–09	Malmö Redhawks	HockeyAllsvenskan	44	12	15	27	22	—	—	—	—	—
2009–10	Malmö Redhawks	HockeyAllsvenskan	52	19	23	42	63	5	1	2	3	4
2010–11	Malmö Redhawks	HockeyAllsvenskan	38	15	14	29	51	—	—	—	—	—
2011–12	Jokerit	SM-liiga	53	16	25	41	26	10	4	2	6	4
2012–13	Jokerit	SM-liiga	32	6	4	10	14	6	0	4	4	4
2012–13	Kiekko-Vantaa	Mestis	1	0	1	1	0	—	—	—	—	—
2013–14	Jokerit	Liiga	57	16	19	35	34	1	1	0	1	25
2014–15	Linköping HC	SHL	47	8	15	23	18	11	5	3	8	4
2015–16	Linköping HC	SHL	30	9	10	19	33	5	0	3	3	2
2016–17	Malmö Redhawks	SHL	45	5	10	15	16	13	4	7	11	6
2017–18	Malmö Redhawks	SHL	36	9	12	21	14	1	0	0	0	0
2018–19	Malmö Redhawks	SHL	28	2	3	5	6	—	—	—	—	—
2018–19	Växjö Lakers HC	SHL	12	2	1	3	8	7	1	0	1	2
2019–20	IK Oskarshamn	SHL	31	2	6	8	31	—	—	—	—	—
2019–20	Linköping HC	SHL	14	3	2	5	2	—	—	—	—	—
2020–21	Rungsted Seier Capital	Denmark	47	26	27	53	12	15	8	4	12	4
2021–22	Rungsted Seier Capital	Denmark	14	3	1	4	0	17	5	6	11	4
SHL totals			243	40	59	99	128	37	10	13	23	14
Liiga (SM-liiga) totals			148	39	48	87	76	28	9	9	18	35
Denmark totals			162	53	71	124	102	32	13	10	23	8
HockeyAllsvenskan totals			134	46	52	98	136	5	1	2	3	4
