= Șova =

Șova is a Romanian surname. Notable people with the surname include:

- Dan Șova (born 1973), Romanian politician
- Lucian Șova, (born 1960), Romanian politician
- Nicolae Șova born 1959), Romanian general and politician
- Vasilii Șova (born 1959), Moldovan politician and diplomat

== See also ==
- Sova
