= Vesa Toskala =

Finnish ice hockey player (born 1977)

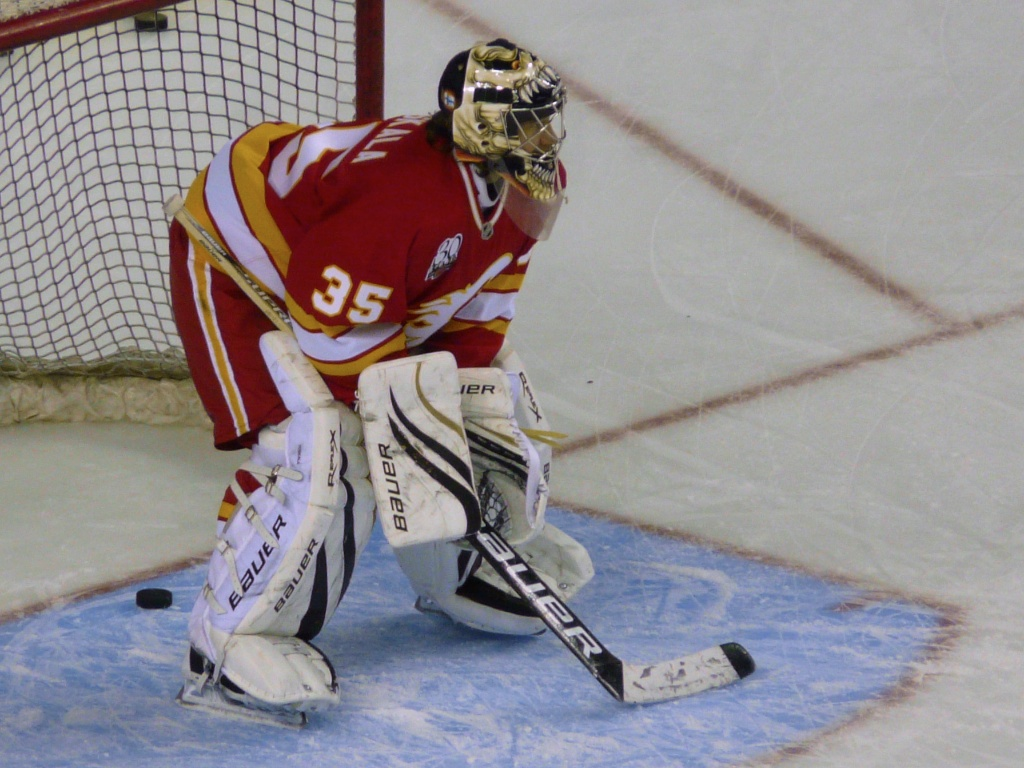
- Toskala with the Calgary Flames in 2010
- Born: May 20, 1977 (age 49) Tampere, Finland
- Height: 5 ft 10 in (178 cm)
- Weight: 198 lb (90 kg; 14 st 2 lb)
- Position: Goaltender
- Caught: Left
- Played for: Ilves; Färjestad BK; San Jose Sharks; Toronto Maple Leafs; Calgary Flames; AIK IF
- National team: Finland
- NHL draft: 90th overall, 1995; San Jose Sharks
- Playing career: 1995–2012

Vesa Tapani Toskala (born May 20, 1977) is a Finnish former professional ice hockey goaltender.

After initially playing for his hometown team Ilves of the SM-liiga, Toskala played the majority of his professional career in the National Hockey League (NHL) with the San Jose Sharks, Toronto Maple Leafs and Calgary Flames.

== Early career ==
Toskala was selected by San Jose in the fourth round, 90th overall, in the 1995 NHL entry draft. Toskala turned heads with his stellar play in the 1998–99 season with Ilves of the Finnish SM-liiga, where he went 21–12–0 with a 2.14 goals against average, a 0.916 save percentage and five shutouts. The next season, playing a style that modeled after Markus Korhonen, Toskala played with Färjestad BK of the Swedish Elitserien and posted an impressive 2.59 GAA. Toskala considered quitting hockey to attend school full-time, until the San Jose Sharks enticed him to North America.

Toskala is the only San Jose Sharks goalie to record a multiple point game. He had two assists against Chicago on February 3, 2007.

=== North American career ===
In his first North American season in 2000–01, Toskala played for the Kentucky Thoroughblades of the American Hockey League (AHL). Splitting time with second-year pro and Finnish compatriot Miikka Kiprusoff, he played 44 games, posting a 22–13–5 record with a 2.77 goals against average and a 0.911 save percentage, quickly adapting to the North American game and played three games for Kentucky in the playoffs. The next year, after the team's move to Cleveland, he took over the starting role after Kiprusoff was recalled to the San Jose Sharks, and in 62 games, he went 19–33–7 with a 2.99 GAA and a 0.912 save percentage. That season, he led the league in games played and saves made (1,845). When Kiprusoff fell to injury, Toskala was called up to San Jose to serve as back-up to regular starter Evgeni Nabokov. Toskala received ten minutes of playing time in his first stint in the NHL, where he stopped the two shots he faced.

=== San Jose Sharks ===
In the 2002–03 NHL season, after Evgeni Nabokov and the Sharks could not settle on a contract, Toskala served as Kiprusoff's backup. When Kiprusoff faltered, Toskala stepped in and played admirably, going 4–3–1 with a 2.35 GAA and a 0.927 save percentage. He earned his first shutout in a 25-save effort against the Detroit Red Wings. After Nabokov was re-signed, however, Toskala was sent back to the Sharks' minor league affiliate in Cleveland, where he struggled, going 15–30–2 with a 3.21 GAA and a 0.903 save percentage. Nonetheless, at the end of the regular season, the Sharks recalled Toskala, meaning the Sharks now carried three goaltenders on their roster. Since Nabokov was the established starter, Kiprusoff and Toskala fought for the backup position; Toskala "won" the battle when Kiprusoff was eventually traded to the Calgary Flames. Although playing in 28 games and posting a 12–8–4 record with a 2.06 GAA and a 0.930 save percentage, Toskala did not make an appearance in the playoffs.

2005–06 proved to be a career year for Toskala. He began as the backup to Evgeni Nabokov, but after a start on February 8, he posted a record of 17–2–2, leading the team to a playoff berth. Toskala's goals-against-average fell from 3.25 to 2.55, while his save percentage increased from 0.872 to .900. This earned him the nickname "The Finnish Horse" from Sharks broadcaster Dan Rusanowsky. Toskala's play earned him several accolades and relegated Nabokov to the role of backup goaltender. On February 27, the Sharks re-signed Toskala to a two-year contract extension worth US$2.75 million. Toskala finished the playoffs with 2.45 goals-against-average and a 0.910 save percentage.

Since both Toskala and Nabokov were seen as number one goalies, the Sharks attempted to trade one or the other before the season began. No trade occurred, and coach Ron Wilson opted to alternate starts between the two. Through 71 games, Toskala played in 35 games, starting 31 and posting a 2.45 GAA, along with three shutouts. Nabokov received the nod after that, playing in San Jose's remaining regular season and playoff games.

=== Toronto Maple Leafs ===
On June 22, during the 2007 NHL entry draft weekend, Sharks general manager Doug Wilson traded Toskala and forward Mark Bell to the Toronto Maple Leafs in exchange for the club's 2007 first (13th overall, Lars Eller ) and second round draft picks, both of which were later traded to the St. Louis Blues, as well as Toronto's fourth round pick in 2009, which was eventually traded to the Nashville Predators.

The Toronto Maple Leafs subsequently signed Toskala to a two-year contract. He and goaltender Andrew Raycroft shared starts until late November, when Toskala's GAA and save percentage improved dramatically. He recorded two shutouts in December and the NHL named him best goaltender of the month.

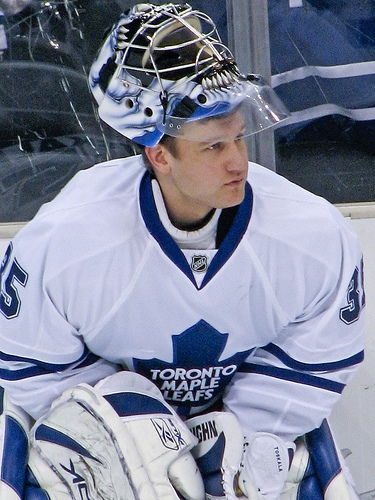
Vesa Toskala suited up in a game for the Toronto Maple Leafs on January 10, 2008

On March 18, 2008, in a match against the New York Islanders, Toskala suffered an embarrassing moment. On a Leafs power play, defenceman Rob Davison of the Islanders attempted to clear the puck out of his defensive zone. Taken from 174 feet, the shot bounced erratically five times before eventually bouncing over Toskala's glove and into the net. It was only Davison's third goal in 187 career games.

In the 2009 NHL regular season opener on October 9, 2008, the official scoresheet between the Toronto Maple Leafs and Detroit Red Wings listed Toskala as the Maple Leafs captain. Coach Ron Wilson stated that the scoresheet was a mistake.

On March 4, 2009, Toskala announced that he would be undergoing season-ending surgery to repair a torn acetabular labrum. The Maple Leafs claimed goalie Martin Gerber off of re-entry waivers to replace him. For the first game of the following season, on October 1, 2009, Toskala was the Maple Leafs starting goaltender in an overtime loss to the Montreal Canadiens. Toskala would lose his first four starts before being replaced as the Leafs' starting goaltender.

In late 2009, a prank he pulled on interviewer Zdenek Matejovsky received coverage from Finnish news and 424 000 views on YouTube (note: the original video was removed). Matejovsky, who doesn't understand Finnish, had been hired by the Finnish TV channel MTV3 to interview Toskala in English and have him respond in Finnish, but Toskala instead made a joke out of it and responded to the serious questions with humorous, unrelated answers. Matejovsky continued with the businesslike questions while having no idea what Toskala was saying.

=== Calgary Flames ===
Toskala was traded to the Anaheim Ducks along with Jason Blake for Jean-Sébastien Giguère on January 31, 2010,

The Ducks then traded Toskala to the Calgary Flames for backup Curtis McElhinney right before the NHL trade deadline on March 3, 2010, having never appeared in net for the Ducks in his short stint. He was reunited with his former Sharks teammate Miikka Kiprusoff in Calgary. On March 7, in his first game as a Flame, Toskala stopped 27 shots en route to a 5–2 victory. In his second game, he backstopped the Flames to a 3–2 victory over the Colorado Avalanche. On June 6, 2010, Flames general manager Darryl Sutter said Toskala would not return with the Flames for the 2010–11 season.

=== AIK IF ===
On November 1, 2010, due to AIK IF of the Elitserien (SEL) suffering from injuries, Toskala signed a one-month contract with the club. Playing in two games, he posted a .898 save percentage and 3.07 goals against average.

=== Ilves and retirement ===
In June 2011, Toskala signed a contract to return to his hometown team Ilves for the 2011–12 season. With a decline in form and lingering injury at season's end, Toskala retired from hockey on October 2, 2012.

== Personal life ==
Toskala spent two years in Finland training to be a chef, although he claims that he was "not particularly good."

== Awards ==
- 2001–02: The Hockey News AHL Mid-Season All-Rookie Team
- NHL Goaltender of the Month – December 2007

== Career statistics ==
=== Regular season and playoffs ===
			Regular season										Playoffs
Season	Team	League	GP	W	L	T	OTL	MIN	GA	SO	GAA	SV%	GP	W	L	MIN	GA	SO	GAA	SV%
1994–95	Ilves	FIN U20	17	10	5	1	—	956	36	2	2.26	.919	7	—	—	393	22	—	3.36	.895
1995–96	Ilves	FIN U20	3	3	0	0	—	180	3	0	1.00	.960	—	—	—	—	—	—	—	—
1995–96	Ilves	SM-l	37	14	14	7	—	2072	109	1	3.16	.902	2	0	2	78	11	0	4.46	.771
1995–96	KOOVEE	FIN.2	2	1	1	0	—	119	5	1	2.51	.911	—	—	—	—	—	—	—	—
1996–97	Ilves	FIN U20	3	—	—	—	—	184	9	—	2.93	.907	—	—	—	—	—	—	—	—
1996–97	Ilves	SM-l	40	22	12	5	—	2270	108	0	2.85	.906	8	3	5	479	29	0	3.63	.881
1997–98	Ilves	SM-l	43	26	13	3	—	2554	118	1	2.77	.906	9	6	3	519	18	1	2.08	.930
1998–99	Ilves	SM-l	33	21	12	0	—	1966	70	5	2.14	.916	4	1	3	248	14	0	3.39	.899
1999–00	Färjestad BK	SEL	44	—	—	—	—	2652	118	3	2.67	.887	7	—	—	439	19	0	2.60	.908
2000–01	Kentucky Thoroughblades	AHL	44	22	13	5	—	2466	114	2	2.77	.911	3	0	3	197	8	0	2.44	.928
2001–02	San Jose Sharks	NHL	1	0	0	0	—	10	0	0	0.00	1.000	—	—	—	—	—	—	—	—
2001–02	Cleveland Barons	AHL	62	19	33	7	—	3574	178	3	2.99	.912	—	—	—	—	—	—	—	—
2002–03	Cleveland Barons	AHL	49	15	30	2	—	2824	151	1	3.21	.903	—	—	—	—	—	—	—	—
2002–03	San Jose Sharks	NHL	11	4	3	1	—	537	21	1	2.35	.927	—	—	—	—	—	—	—	—
2003–04	San Jose Sharks	NHL	28	12	8	4	—	1541	53	1	2.06	.930	—	—	—	—	—	—	—	—
2004–05	Ilves	SM-l	3	0	1	2	—	186	8	0	2.58	.930	6	3	3	357	19	0	3.19	.919
2005–06	San Jose Sharks	NHL	37	23	7	—	4	2039	87	2	2.56	.901	11	6	5	686	28	1	2.45	.910
2005–06	Cleveland Barons	AHL	1	0	0	—	1	65	0	1	0.00	1.000	—	—	—	—	—	—	—	—
2006–07	San Jose Sharks	NHL	38	26	10	—	1	2142	84	4	2.35	.908	—	—	—	—	—	—	—	—
2007–08	Toronto Maple Leafs	NHL	66	33	25	—	6	3837	175	3	2.74	.904	—	—	—	—	—	—	—	—
2008–09	Toronto Maple Leafs	NHL	53	22	17	—	11	3056	166	1	3.26	.891	—	—	—	—	—	—	—	—
2009–10	Toronto Maple Leafs	NHL	26	7	12	—	3	1393	85	1	3.66	.874	—	—	—	—	—	—	—	—
2009–10	Calgary Flames	NHL	6	2	0	—	0	212	8	0	2.26	.918	—	—	—	—	—	—	—	—
2010–11	AIK	SEL	2	0	2	—	0	120	6	0	3.07	.898	—	—	—	—	—	—	—	—
2011–12	Ilves	SM-l	22	1	15	—	5	1242	71	1	3.43	.885	—	—	—	—	—	—	—	—
SM-l totals			178	84	67	17	5	10,290	484	8	2.82	—	29	13	16	1681	91	1	3.25	—
NHL totals			266	129	82	5	25	14,767	679	13	2.76	.902	11	6	5	686	28	1	2.45	.910

=== International ===
Year	Team	Event	GP	W	L	T	MIN	GA	SO	GAA	SV%
1995	Finland	EJC	3	—	—	—	—	—	—	3.33	.882
1996	Finland	WJC	4	—	—	—	204	15	0	4.41	.864
1997	Finland	WJC	4	—	—	—	250	12	—	2.88	.874
2000	Finland	WC	5	—	—	—	299	15	0	3.01	.850
Senior totals			5	—	—	—	299	15	0	3.01	.850
