= Markus Korhonen =

Finnish ice hockey player

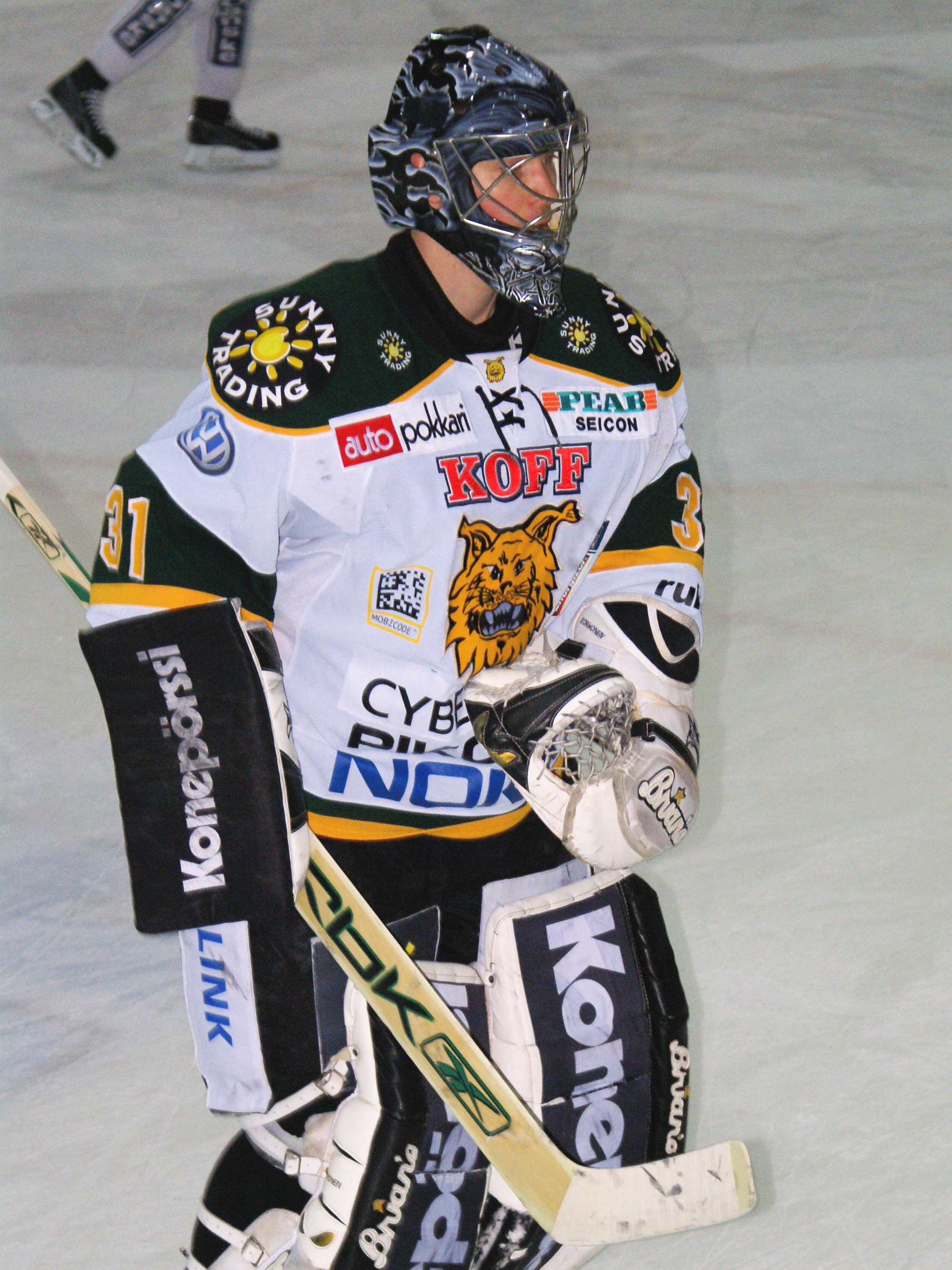
- Born: 29 April 1975 (age 50) Tampere, Finland
- Height: 6 ft 1 in (185 cm)
- Weight: 183 lb (83 kg; 13 st 1 lb)
- Position: Goaltender
- Caught: Left
- Played for: TuTo; Kärpät; Lukko; Ilves
- Playing career: 1994–2010

Markus Korhonen (born 29 April 1975) is a Finnish former professional ice hockey goaltender and the current goaltending coach of Ilves.

Korhonen's son Rasmus Korhonen is a goaltender for Porin Ässät.

== Playing career ==
Korhonen began his career with Ilves, based in his hometown of Tampere, where he played for the junior team. He then spent two seasons with TuTo, where he served as backup to Timo Lehkonen and Jukka Tammi in respective seasons.

Korhonen returned to Ilves in 1996, backing up Vesa Toskala. After that, he played for Kärpät, where despite posting the best save percentage in his career, he still served as backup to Tim Thomas.

Seeking a starting role, Korhonen moved to Brynäs IF in Sweden's Elitserien in 2003 and played 48 games as a starter as the team finished 10th of 12 teams. After 8 games the next season, he moved to the Russian Superleague and spent the rest of the season with SKA St. Petersburg. Korhonen returned to Brynäs in 2005, again playing 48 games.

In 2006, Korhonen split his time between Malmö in Sweden and Lukko in Finland. He again returned to Brynäs in 2007.

In 2008 he had spells in the Oddset Ligaen in Denmark with Esbjerg IK and in the Erste Bank Eishockey Liga in Austria for Slovenian side HDD Olimpija Ljubljana, before returning to Ilves in January 2009.

Korhonen retired after the 2009-10 season.

== Coaching career ==
Korhonen has worked as the goaltending coach of Ilves since the 2010-11 season. During his tenure in Ilves, Korhonen has coached, for example, Sami Aittokallio, Ville Kolppanen, Joonas Korpisalo, Lukáš Dostál, and Eetu Mäkiniemi.
