= Christian Sauvé =

French painter (1943–2023)

- Born: 12 July 1943; Déville-lès-Rouen, German-occupied France
- Died: 11 January 2023 (aged 79); Sainte-Beuve-en-Rivière, France
- Education: École régionale d'art de Rouen; Beaux-Arts de Paris
- Occupations: Painter; Professor

Christian Sauvé (12 July 1943 – 11 January 2023) was a French painter and professor.

== Biography ==
Born in Déville-lès-Rouen on 12 July 1943, Sauvé began painting at the age of 12. He was mentored by Léonard Bordes, Maurice Vaumousse, and Gaston Sébire. At the École régionale d'art de Rouen, he was a student of Léon Toublanc and Robert Savary. During this time, he met Marie-Ange Rialland, who he would later marry, and designed murals at a school in Le Havre designed by the architect Bernard Zehrfuss. He then attended the Beaux-Arts de Paris from 1967 to 1968, where he was a student of Maurice Brianchon.

After staying in Italy, Belgium, the Netherlands, and England, Sauvé received the Grand Prix de la Casa de Velázquez in 1969 and began a stay in Madrid. From 1970 to 1971, he stayed in Portugal, Senegal, Mauritania, and Morocco. From 1971 to 2008, he worked as a professor at the École des beaux-arts de Rouen. In 1972, he moved to Mortemer, Seine-Maritime before settling in Sainte-Beuve-en-Rivière for good in 1974. On his painting style, he commented "Painting requires slowness, concentration. You have to give it time to receive it and be able to meditate on it. An artist is like a volcano. He expresses in himself a whole world. The act of painting is like a vital breath, a universal experience. It is a constant quest for light".

Sauvé died in Sainte-Beuve-en-Rivière on 11 January 2023, at the age of 79.
