= Victor Panelin-Borg =

Swedish ice hockey player

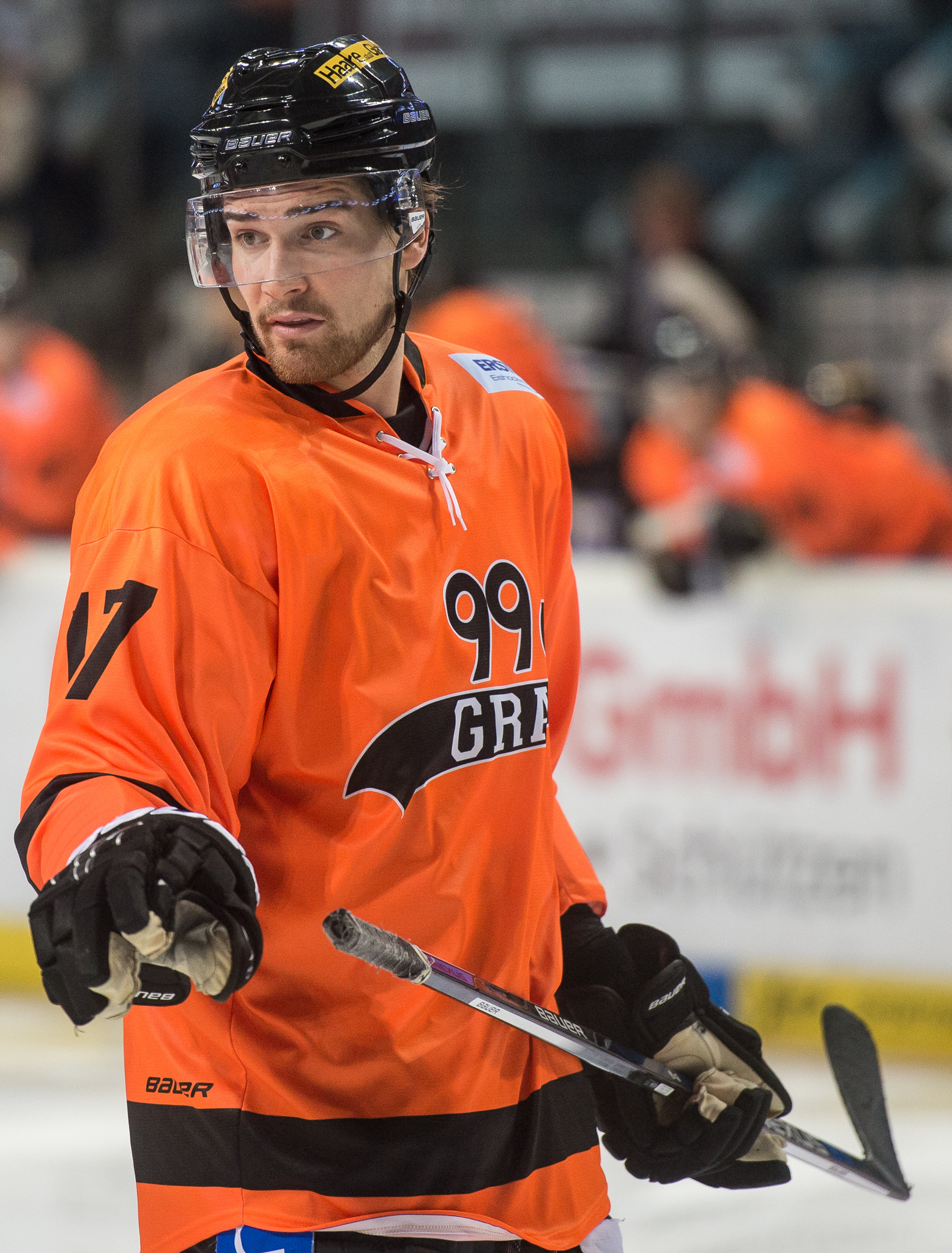
- Born: 11 October 1990 (age 35) Ängelholm, Sweden
- Height: 6 ft 3 in (191 cm)
- Weight: 236 lb (107 kg; 16 st 12 lb)
- Position: Defence
- Shot: Left
- ML team Former teams: Aalborg Pirates; Rögle BK; Sparta Warriors; Graz 99ers
- Playing career: 2010–2022

Victor Panelin-Borg (born 11 October 1990) is a Swedish ice hockey defenceman. He currently plays with Aalborg Pirates of the Danish Metal Ligaen.

Panelin-Borg made his Elitserien (now the SHL) debut playing with Rögle BK during the 2012–13 Elitserien season.

== Career statistics ==
| | | | Regular season | | | | | Playoffs |
| Season | Team | League | GP | G | A | Pts | PIM | GP | G | A | Pts | PIM |
|---|---|---|---|---|---|---|---|---|---|---|---|---|
| 2006–07 | Rögle BK J18 | J18 Elit | — | — | — | — | — | — | — | — | — | — |
| 2007–08 | Rögle BK J18 | J18 Elit | 22 | 2 | 6 | 8 | 36 | — | — | — | — | — |
| 2007–08 | Rögle BK J20 | J20 SuperElit | 13 | 2 | 1 | 3 | 2 | 2 | 0 | 0 | 0 | 0 |
| 2008–09 | Rögle BK J20 | J20 SuperElit | 41 | 2 | 6 | 8 | 50 | — | — | — | — | — |
| 2009–10 | Rögle BK J20 | J20 SuperElit | 41 | 1 | 7 | 8 | 50 | 2 | 0 | 0 | 0 | 2 |
| 2009–10 | Växjö Lakers HC | HockeyAllsvenskan | 1 | 0 | 0 | 0 | 2 | — | — | — | — | — |
| 2010–11 | Rögle BK J20 | J20 SuperElit | 1 | 1 | 0 | 1 | 2 | — | — | — | — | — |
| 2010–11 | Rögle BK | HockeyAllsvenskan | 49 | 2 | 6 | 8 | 92 | 10 | 0 | 1 | 1 | 16 |
| 2011–12 | Rögle BK J20 | J20 SuperElit | 3 | 0 | 0 | 0 | 2 | — | — | — | — | — |
| 2011–12 | Rögle BK | HockeyAllsvenskan | 48 | 1 | 4 | 5 | 69 | 10 | 0 | 1 | 1 | 0 |
| 2012–13 | Rögle BK | Elitserien | 53 | 0 | 5 | 5 | 40 | — | — | — | — | — |
| 2013–14 | Rögle BK J20 | J20 SuperElit | 1 | 0 | 0 | 0 | 0 | — | — | — | — | — |
| 2013–14 | Rögle BK | HockeyAllsvenskan | 37 | 1 | 4 | 5 | 28 | — | — | — | — | — |
| 2013–14 | Aalborg Pirates | Denmark | 8 | 0 | 3 | 3 | 29 | 13 | 0 | 0 | 0 | 14 |
| 2014–15 | Sparta Sarpsborg | Norway | 43 | 3 | 10 | 13 | 106 | 11 | 1 | 1 | 2 | 6 |
| 2015–16 | Graz 99ers | EBEL | 6 | 0 | 0 | 0 | 10 | — | — | — | — | — |
| 2015–16 | Sparta Sarpsborg | Norway | 26 | 1 | 3 | 4 | 84 | 4 | 0 | 1 | 1 | 4 |
| 2016–17 | Aalborg Pirates | Denmark | 42 | 2 | 10 | 12 | 39 | 7 | 1 | 2 | 3 | 6 |
| 2017–18 | Aalborg Pirates | Denmark | 43 | 1 | 12 | 13 | 32 | 17 | 0 | 4 | 4 | 8 |
| 2018–19 | Aalborg Pirates | Denmark | 35 | 5 | 4 | 9 | 42 | 11 | 0 | 2 | 2 | 6 |
| 2019–20 | Aalborg Pirates | Denmark | 29 | 1 | 4 | 5 | 51 | — | — | — | — | — |
| 2020–21 | Aalborg Pirates | Denmark | 42 | 4 | 3 | 7 | 26 | 16 | 1 | 1 | 2 | 6 |
| 2021–22 | Aalborg Pirates | Denmark | 40 | 4 | 8 | 12 | 30 | 11 | 0 | 2 | 2 | 6 |
| Elitserien totals | | | 53 | 0 | 5 | 5 | 40 | — | — | — | — | — |
| HockeyAllsvenskan totals | | | 135 | 4 | 14 | 18 | 191 | 20 | 0 | 2 | 2 | 16 |
| Denmark totals | | | 239 | 17 | 44 | 61 | 249 | 75 | 2 | 11 | 13 | 46 |
| Norway totals | | | 69 | 4 | 13 | 17 | 190 | 15 | 1 | 2 | 3 | 10 |
