= Sova (surname) =

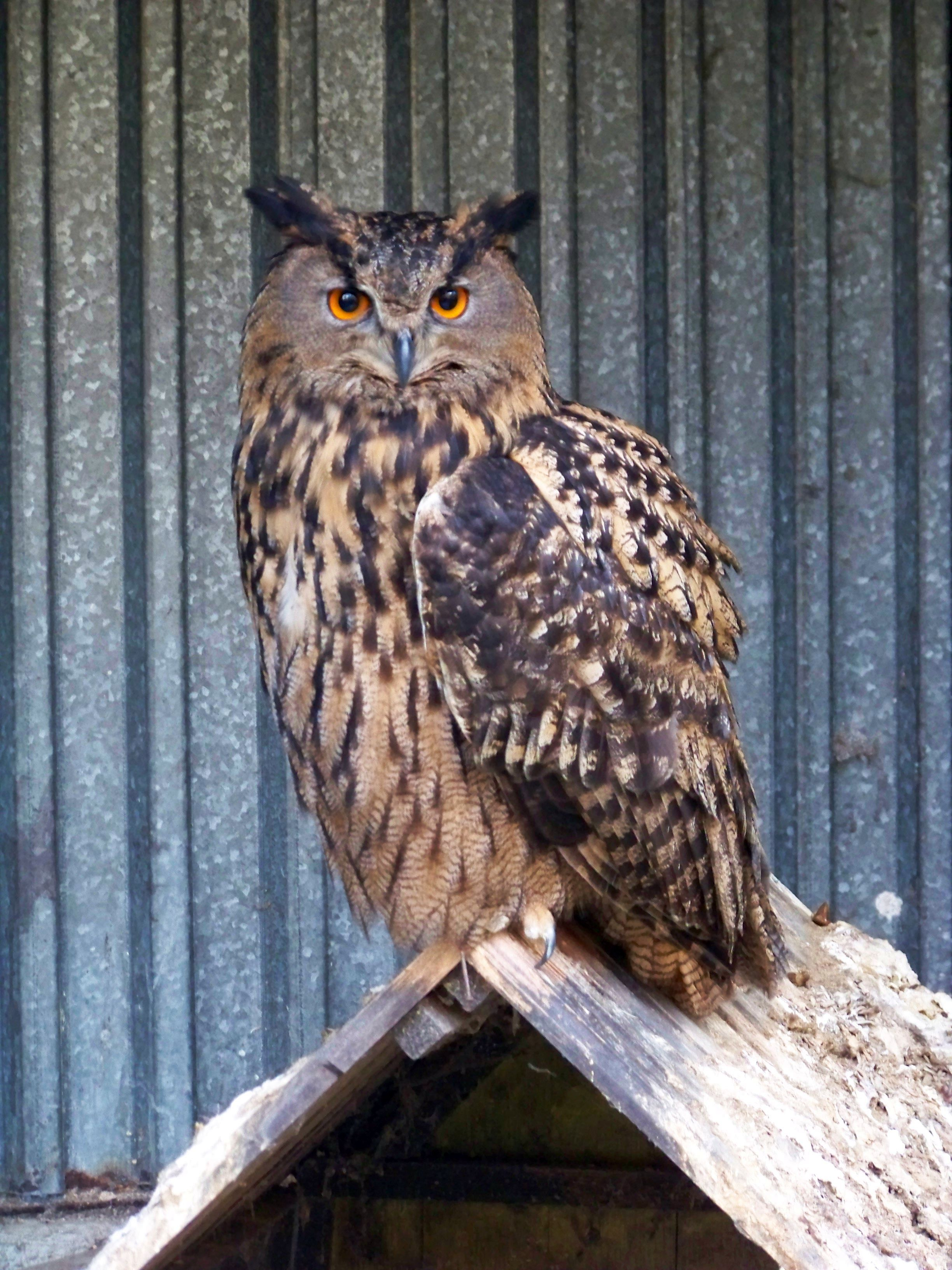

Origin
- Meaning: Slavic: Owl; French: Saved
- Region of origin: Central/Eastern Europe

Other names
- Variant form: Sowa

Sova (Czech/Slovak feminine: Sovová) is a surname. The word literally means "owl" in several Slavic languages. It may also be a spelling without diacritics of the Romanian surname Șova. It can also be an altered form of the French surname Sauvé:. Notable people with this surname include:

- Aleš Sova (born 1991), Czech ice hockey player
- Antonín Sova (1864–1928), Czech poet
- Charles E. Sova (1928–2019), American politician
- Evgeny Sova (born 1980), Israeli journalist
- Joe Sova (born 1988), American ice hockey player
- Lyubov Sova (born 1979), Russian philologist
- Peter Sova (1944–2020), Czech-American cinematographer
- Romen Sova (1938–2001), Ukrainian toxicologist
- Vahur Sova (born 1956), Estonian architect

== See also ==
- Sowa (surname)
