= Matthew Sauvé =

Canadian actor and producer (born 1978)

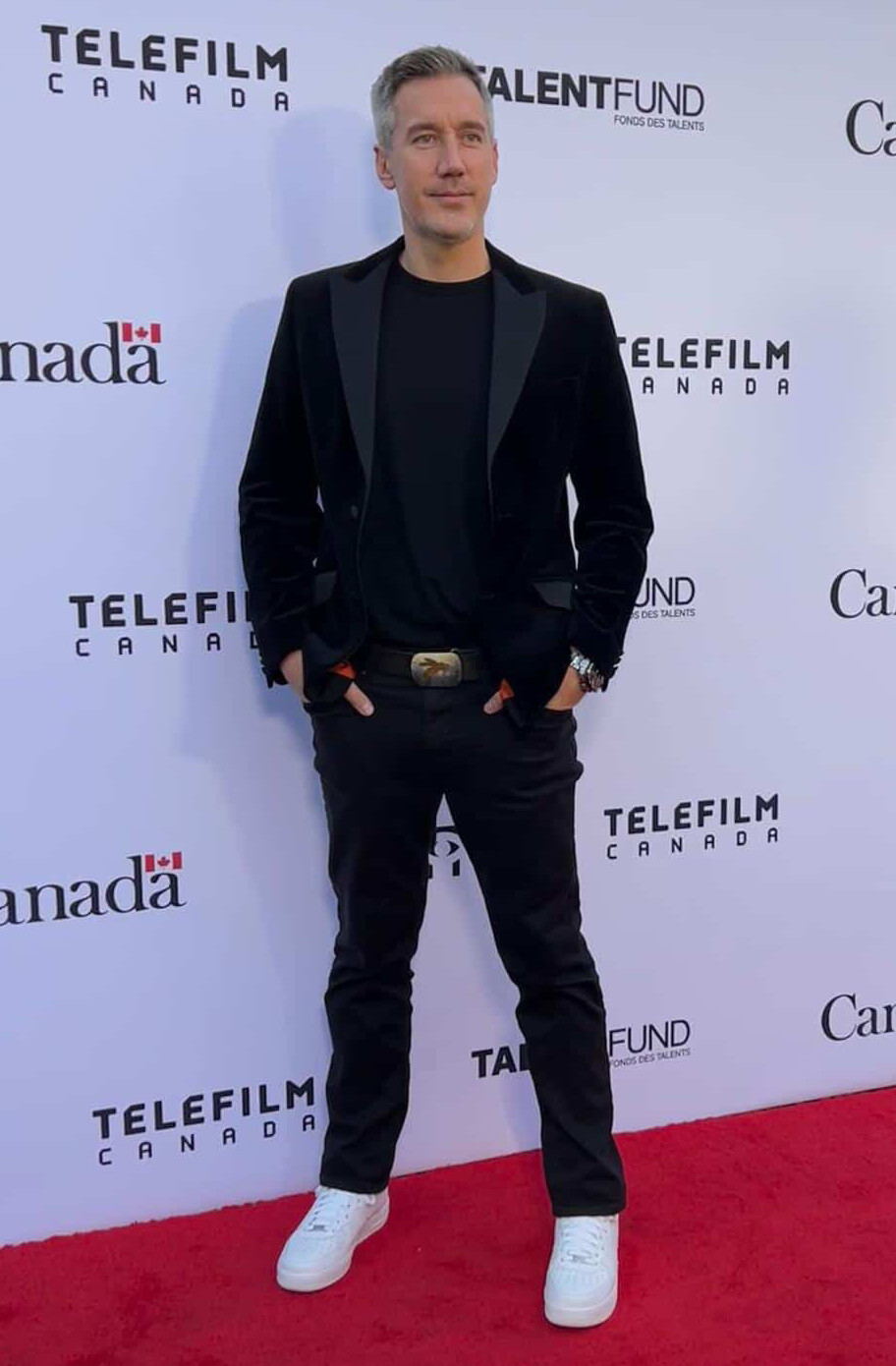
- Sauvé at the 2023 Oscar week
- Born: September 21, 1978 (age 47); Toronto, Ontario, Canada
- Education: Durham College (Marketing and Business)
- Occupations: Actor; producer
- Years active: 2012–present
- Awards: Best Actor (One Night Stand) – 60+ international awards

Matthew Sauvé (born September 21, 1978) is a Canadian actor and producer known for his work in film and television. He is best known for his lead role in the short film One Night Stand (2019), which earned him over 60 Best Actor awards at film festivals worldwide.

== Early life ==
Matthew Sauvé was born on September 21, 1978, in Toronto, Ontario, Canada. Sauvé graduated from the Marketing and Business program at Durham College in 2002. Before pursuing acting, he worked in law enforcement for 12 years. He transitioned into acting in 2012, initially taking roles in commercials and minor television productions.

== Career ==
Sauvé gained international recognition for his lead role in the short film One Night Stand (2019), which won over 60 Best Actor awards. In 2021, he won Best Supporting Actor at the Europe International Film Festival for A Stand for Damaged Fame.

He has appeared in various television productions, including Carter, Fear Thy Neighbor, and Web of Lies. He also starred in the music video for Simple Plan's Singing in the Rain, which received significant airplay in the United States.

He also co-created and stars in the television series Disrepair with Tommy James Murphy, which premiered on Bell Media’s TV1 on January 29, 2025. The series draws inspiration from his personal experiences with addiction and recovery.

Sauvé is set to star alongside Ne-Yo and CeCe Peniston in the romantic comedy The Pact.

== Personal life ==
Prior to entering acting Sauvé struggled with sobriety and found acting after getting sober.

Outside of acting, Sauvé mentors young actors and frequently conducts acting workshops for children in Toronto.

== Filmography ==
=== Film ===
Year	Title	Role	Notes
2013	Documentary of Dead	Mercenary	Short film
2014	The Interrogation	Detective	Short film
2014	The Captive	Party Guest	
2015	Dead and Breakfast	Sam	Short film
2015	Taco	Guy 1	Short film
2015	The Plagued	Bradley	
2016	Cold One Night	Driver	Short film
2016	One Night Stand	Travis	Short film; also executive producer
2016	Trigger	Car Shooter	
2017	Routine	Actor	Short film
2018	Belushi's Toilet	Dr. Lindsay	
2018	Detainee X	Sgt. Jordan / Swat #1	
2018	On the Ropes	Ottino	
2019	Two Minutes	Steve	Short film
2020	Endgame	Father	Short film
2021	A Stand for Damaged Fame	Aidan Ethan Watson	Short film
2023	Death by King Cake	Brennan Jefferson	Short film
2025	Midnight Dreamers	Carmichael	Completed; release TBA

=== Television ===
Year	Title	Role	Notes
2015	Close Encounters	Deputy McFadden	2 episodes
2016	Web of Lies	Deputy Dan DeLimon	Episode: "The Honeytrap"
2016	See No Evil	Officer Tim Peck	Episode: "Vanished from Campus"
2016	Fear Thy Neighbor	Rick; Ethan Gilmour	Episodes: "Tunnel of Hate"; "Nail in the Coffin"
2017	Canada: The Story of Us	DIA Staffer	Episode: "A New Identity (1946–1970)"
2018	Carter	Cop #1	Episode: "The Flood"
2018	Bizarre Murders	Detective Landon	Episode: "Dumb Luck"
2018	See No Evil	Detective Kevin Jeffrey	Episode: "Seeking Out Maple" (uncredited)
2019	See No Evil	Sgt. Jason Young	Episode: "The Last Shop" (uncredited)
2019	Paranormal 911	Police Officer / Richard	2 episodes; incl. "Coffin Corridor"
2019	Paranormal Emergency	Police Officer	1 episode
2019	Disasters at Sea	Commander Kyle McAvoy	Episode: "The Sinking of the Lady Mary"
2019	Unexplained	Officer Wolbert	1 episode
2021	When We First Met	Jack	Miniseries; 2 episodes (completed)
2015	Belushi's Toilet	Doctor Lindsay	1 episode
2025	Disrepair	Jake Thomas	Miniseries; 4 episodes
