= Spiral Island =

Artificial island

Coordinates: 21.23043°N 86.737189°W

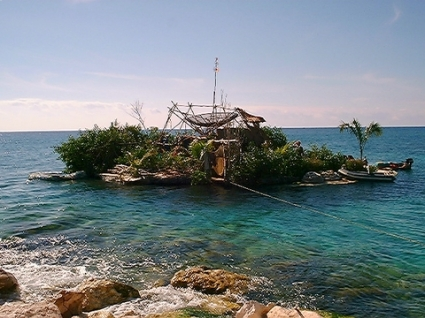
Spiral Island I in early March 2000

Spiral Island was a floating artificial island built in Mexico by British artist Richart "Reishee" Sowa. It was destroyed by Hurricane Emily in 2005. A replacement, Joyxee Island, had been open for tours since 2008, but closed after it was damaged by storms and the local authority ordered its removal.

Spiral Island was featured in newspapers and TV documentaries around the world, including in Japan and South Korea, as well as an episode of the Ripley's Believe It or Not! TV series, and on the MTV program Extreme Cribs in 2011.

== Spiral Island ==
The first Spiral island was located in a lagoon near Puerto Aventuras, on the Caribbean coast of Mexico south of Cancún; Richart Sowa began constructing it in 1998. He filled nets with empty discarded plastic bottles to support a structure of plywood and bamboo, on which he poured sand and planted numerous plants, including mangroves. The island sported a two-story house, a solar oven, a self-composting toilet, and three beaches. He used some 250,000 bottles for the 66-by-54-foot (20 m × 16 m) structure.

Sowa was ordered to take the island out of the man-made canal in 2004 because many private homes and condos were being built, and he lived for one year tied to the end of a loose rock pier. Sowa was offered a new location in the bay of Soliman about 200 km (124 mi) south. Finally, he was permitted by Port authorities to tow Spiral Island, but the island was destroyed by Hurricane Emily in 2005.

== Joyxee Island ==
In late 2007 and 2008, Sowa built a replacement for Spiral Island in the waters of Isla Mujeres, the "Island of Women", also near Cancun. It opened for tours in August 2008.

The new island was initially 20 metres (66 ft) in diameter and contained about 100,000 bottles. It has since expanded to 25 metres (82 ft) due to various plants and mangroves growing from the island. The new island has three beaches, a house, two ponds, a wave-powered washing machine, solar panels, a solar-powered waterfall and river. The island is a constant work in progress with volunteers and Sowa himself continually making improvements.

In May 2011, Reishee embarked on a project to berth his island out in Isla Mujeres Bay, as it was now too big for its current site off a pier in Laguna Majax. The Mexican Government also recognized Joyxee Island as an "Eco Boat" and therefore needed to comply with all current boating regulations, which involved the purchase of fire extinguishers, life ring buoys and emergency kits. The project was launched on kickstarter.com with a goal of $18,000 that it failed to reach. Reishee later successfully relaunched the project with a more conservative $9,000 goal.

Joyxee Island was open for tours at one point. However, it was damaged by storms and the local authorities made the owner remove it in January 2019.
