= Radek Číp =

Czech ice hockey player

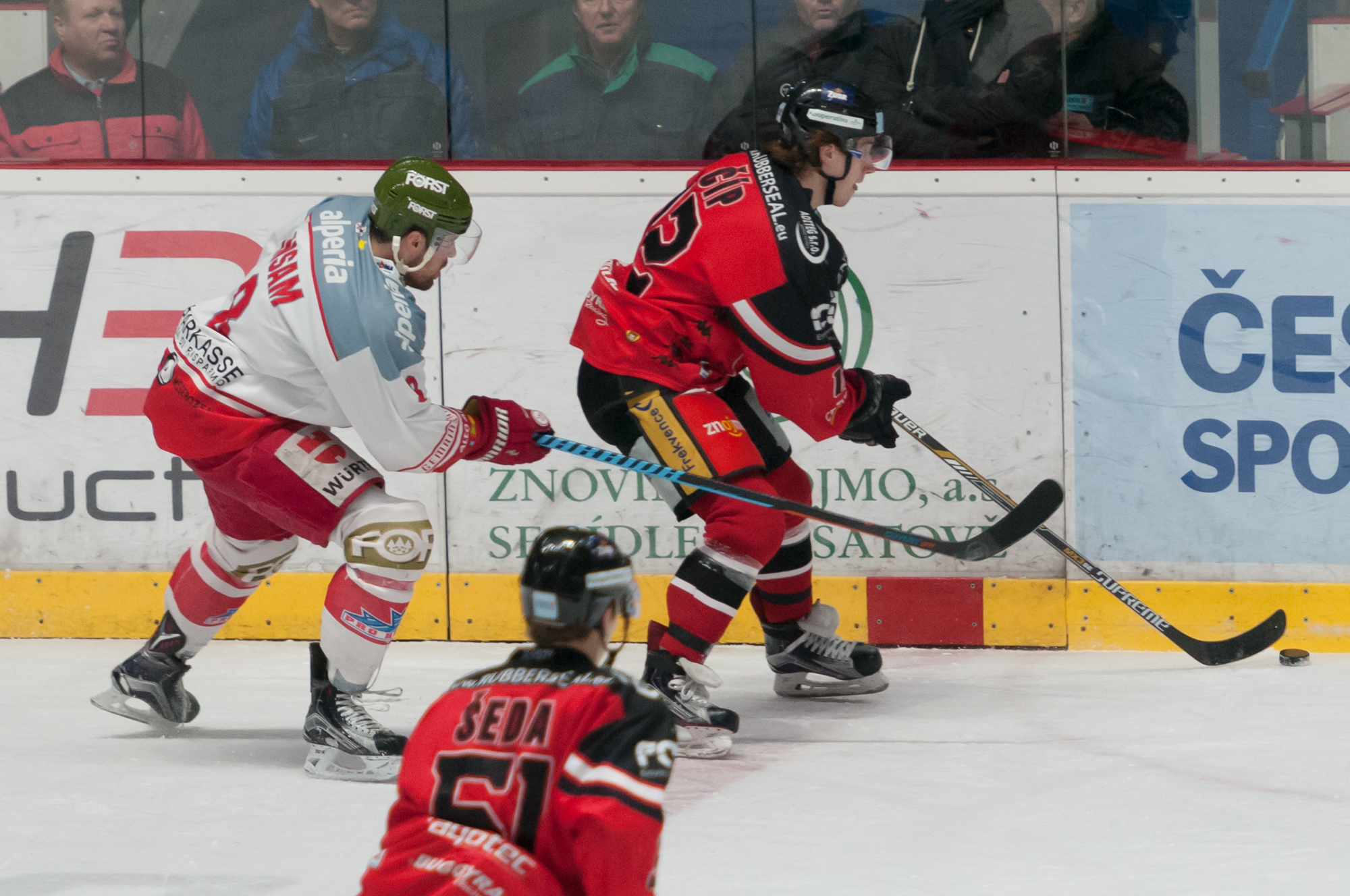
- Born: June 17, 1992 (age 34) Czechoslovakia
- Height: 6 ft 2 in (188 cm)
- Weight: 209 lb (95 kg; 14 st 13 lb)
- Position: Forward
- Shoots: Right
- EBEL team Former teams: Orli Znojmo; HC Pardubice
- Playing career: 2012–present

Radek Číp (born June 17, 1992) is a Czech professional ice hockey forward. He currently plays for "les Aigles de Nice" in the Ligue Magnus.

Číp made his Czech Extraliga debut playing with HC Pardubice during the 2013–14 Czech Extraliga season. At the conclusion of the season, Cip left Pardubice as a free agent and signed an optional two-year contract with Czech club, Orli Znojmo, who compete in the Austrian EBEL on May 29, 2014.
