= Mikko Virtanen =

Finnish ice hockey player

- Born: March 7, 1994 (age 31); Kouvola, Finland
- Height: 6 ft 0 in (183 cm)
- Weight: 172 lb (78 kg; 12 st 4 lb)
- Position: Forward
- Shoots: Left
- Liiga team Former teams: KalPa; KooKoo
- NHL draft: Undrafted
- Playing career: 2011–present

Medal record

Representing Finland

Ice hockey

European Youth Olympic Winter Festival
Silver medal – second place	2011 Liberec	

Mikko Virtanen (born March 7, 1994) is a Finnish professional ice hockey player. He is currently playing for KalPa of the Finnish Liiga.

Virtanen previously played for KooKoo and made his Liiga debut with the team during the 2015–16 Liiga season.

== Awards ==
- Mestis Champion: 2013-14
- Mestis Silver: 2014-15
