= Topi Piipponen =

Finnish ice hockey player

- Born: May 2, 1997 (age 27); Siilinjärvi, Finland
- Height: 6 ft 0 in (183 cm)
- Weight: 181 lb (82 kg; 12 st 13 lb)
- Position: Forward
- Shoots: Left
- Metal team Former teams: Odense Bulldogs; KalPa; SaiPa
- Playing career: 2015–present

Topi Piipponen (born May 2, 1997) is a Finnish professional ice hockey player. He is currently playing for Danish club, Odense Bulldogs in the Metal Ligaen (DEN).

== Playing career ==
Piipponen made his Liiga debut playing with KalPa during the 2015–16 Liiga season. He later played three seasons in the top tier with SaiPa.

== International play ==
Piipponen played for Finland at the 2015 IIHF World U18 Championships and won a silver medal in Finland's run to the final.
