= Aleš Sova =

Czech professional ice hockey defenceman (born 1991)

- Born: 24 September 1991 (age 33); Brno, Czechoslovakia
- Height: 6 ft 0 in (183 cm)
- Weight: 198 lb (90 kg; 14 st 2 lb)
- Position: Defence
- Shot: Left
- EBEL team Former teams: Orli Znojmo; HC Kometa Brno; HC Asiago; Herning Blue Fox; Quad City Mallards; Kansas City Mavericks; Greenville Swamp Rabbits; Frederikshavn White Hawks; Anglet Hormadi Élite
- NHL draft: Undrafted
- Playing career: 2009–2023

Aleš Sova (born September 24, 1991) is a Czech professional ice hockey defenceman who plays for Orli Znojmo of the Erste Bank Eishockey Liga.

== Playing career ==
Sova played with HC Kometa Brno in the Czech Extraliga during the 2010–11 Czech Extraliga playoffs whilst also enduring a loan a stint in the 1. národní hokejová liga with HC Rebel Havlíčkův Brod Sova later moved to play with Czech outfit, Orli Znojmo, who competed in the Austrian Hockey League (EBEL).

Following parts of two seasons in Denmark with Herning Blue Fox of the Metal Ligaen, Sova as a free agent opted to pursue a career in North America. He signed a one-year ECHL contract with the Quad City Mallards on September 11, 2017.

After an unsuccessful tenure in the ECHL, Sova returned to Denmark in joining the Frederikshavn White Hawks for the remainder of the season on January 31, 2018.

== Career statistics ==
			Regular season					Playoffs
Season	Team	League	GP	G	A	Pts	PIM	GP	G	A	Pts	PIM
2006–07	HC Slovan Ustecti Lvi U18	Czech U18	38	1	7	8	26	—	—	—	—	—
2007–08	HC Slovan Ustecti Lvi U18	Czech U18	45	2	11	13	52	—	—	—	—	—
2007–08	HC Slovan Ustecti Lvi U20	Czech U20	—	—	—	—	—	—	—	—	—	—
2008–09	HC Kometa Brno U20	Czech U20	43	2	5	7	68	—	—	—	—	—
2009–10	HC Kometa Brno U20	Czech U20	37	3	10	13	69	3	1	1	2	0
2009–10	HC Kometa Brno	Czech	—	—	—	—	—	—	—	—	—	—
2009–10	LHK Jestřábi Prostějov	Czech3	10	0	4	4	8	—	—	—	—	—
2010–11	HC Kometa Brno U20	Czech U20	6	2	2	4	12	—	—	—	—	—
2010–11	HC Kometa Brno	Czech	—	—	—	—	—	—	—	—	—	—
2010–11	HC Havlíčkův Brod	Czech2	36	1	3	4	18	14	0	1	1	12
2011–12	HC Kometa Brno U20	Czech U20	1	1	0	1	2	—	—	—	—	—
2011–12	HC Kometa Brno	Czech	1	0	0	0	0	—	—	—	—	—
2011–12	HC Havlíčkův Brod	Czech2	25	1	2	3	20	—	—	—	—	—
2011–12	Orli Znojmo	EBEL	7	0	0	0	4	4	0	0	0	2
2012–13	Orli Znojmo	EBEL	43	1	3	4	22	5	0	0	0	0
2013–14	Orli Znojmo	EBEL	44	2	4	6	30	5	0	1	1	10
2014–15	Orli Znojmo	EBEL	36	3	2	5	34	5	0	1	1	0
2015–16	LHK Jestřábi Prostějov	Czech2	19	1	1	2	18	—	—	—	—	—
2015–16	HC Asiago	Italy	2	0	1	1	2	—	—	—	—	—
2015–16	Herning Blue Fox	Denmark	13	1	1	2	8	20	0	2	2	2
2016–17	Herning Blue Fox	Denmark	36	1	11	12	68	5	0	0	0	29
2017–18	Quad City Mallards	ECHL	16	0	1	1	2	—	—	—	—	—
2017–18	Kansas City Mavericks	ECHL	6	0	0	0	4	—	—	—	—	—
2017–18	Greenville Swamp Rabbits	ECHL	6	0	0	0	2	—	—	—	—	—
2017–18	Frederikshavn White Hawks	Denmark	6	0	2	2	0	1	0	0	0	0
2018–19	Anglet Hormadi Élite	Ligue Magnus	41	3	14	17	46	—	—	—	—	—
2019–20	Orli Znojmo	EBEL	50	5	12	17	43	3	0	0	0	6
2020–21	LHK Jestřábi Prostějov	Czech2	10	1	2	3	6	—	—	—	—	—
2020–21	Odense Bulldogs	Denmark	14	1	2	3	6	—	—	—	—	—
2021–22	Odense Bulldogs	Denmark	38	3	10	13	12	13	0	2	2	6
2022–23	HC Frýdek-Místek	Czech2	48	2	8	10	54	2	0	0	0	6
ECHL totals			28	0	1	1	8	—	—	—	—	—
Czech totals			1	0	0	0	0	—	—	—	—	—
Czech2 totals			138	6	16	22	116	16	0	1	1	18
Denmark totals			107	6	26	32	94	39	0	4	4	37
EBEL totals			180	11	21	32	133	22	0	2	2	18
