= Adam Sowa =

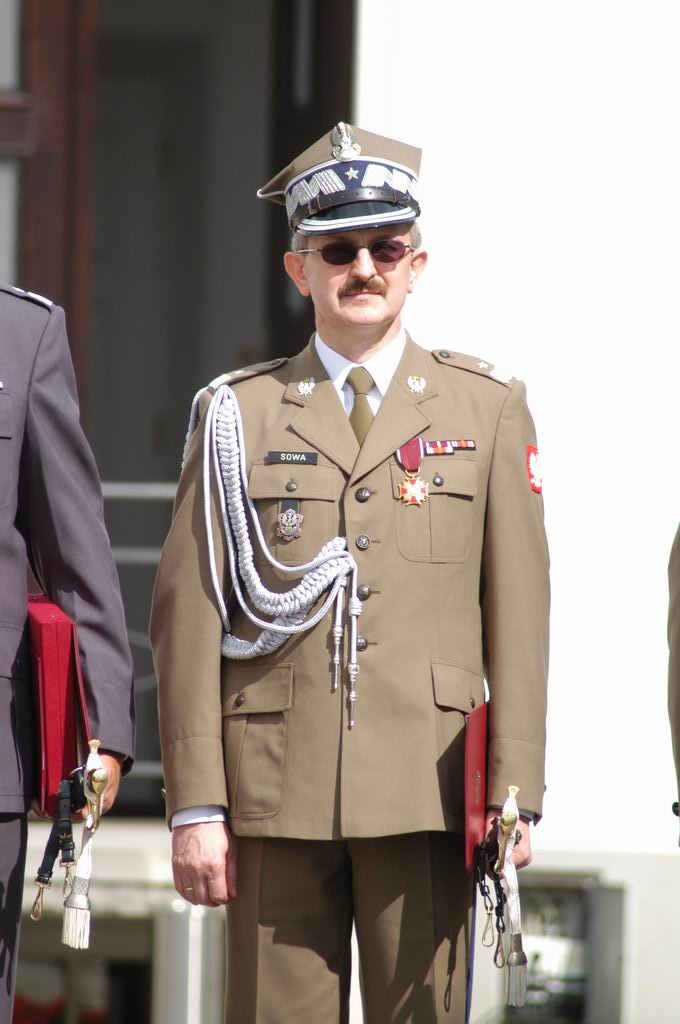
- Generał Adam Sowa
- Born: June 29, 1957; Kraków, Poland
- Military career
- Allegiance: Poland
- Branch: Polish Army
- Service years: 1975 – 2009
- Rank: Brigadier General (Ret)

Brigadier General (Ret) Adam Sowa (born 29 June 1957 in Kraków, Poland) was the deputy chief executive of the European Defence Agency. He served in Polish Army from 1975 and has held a range of appointments related to science and technology, armaments and defense industry, international co-operation, education and training and personnel policy both in Poland and abroad.

== Career ==
He started his career at the Military University of Technology in Warsaw (1980–1989) as a lecturer and scientist. In 1989–1992, he was a military armaments expert on several foreign appointments. Since 1993, he has been Manager of Foreign Training Programs and the National Representative to the NATO Training Group. He participated in three Organization for Security and Co-operation in Europe missions to Bosnia and Herzegovina.

In 2001, he was appointed Chief R&T at the NATO International Military Staff providing NATO Military Committee (MC) liaison on Defence R&T issues to NATO Science Committee, NATO Research and Technology Organization, NATO Undersea Research Center, NATO C3 Agency and Future Capabilities Research and Technology Division of the Allied Command Transformation. He was responsible for NATO MC's yearly Defence R&T Focus Sessions. He was chairman of the MC WG, developing military advice on NATO's Agencies Review and acted as co-vice chairman of the NATO Research and Technology Board and MC Representative to the SACLANTCEN Scientific Committee.

From 2004 to 2006, he was Director of Armaments Policy Department at the Polish Ministry of Defence and member of the Armaments Council, Deputy National Armaments Director, National R&T Director and national Central POC for the European Defence Agency and NATO Conference of National Armaments Directors. His areas of responsibility covered armaments strategic and policy issues, defence R&D, restructuring of the Polish defence industry and R&D Institutes, NATO Long Term Requirements and International Co-operation. He led a team of experts on Materiel Issues for Strategic Defence Review and contributed to the development of a Strategy for the Polish Defence Industry.

As the Polish national representative, he played a part in the strengthening of the European Defence Agency among others by successfully managing negotiations with governmental administration, the Polish defence industry and the trade unions for Poland to join the EDA's Code of Conduct Regime on Defence Procurement. His personal involvement was also vital to the successful launch of a new innovative tool for European R&T co-operation, the Joint Investment Programme on Force Protection.

In 2007, he was appointed Rector of the Military University of Technology in Warsaw and Chairman of the Science and Industry Committee of the Armaments Council. Since January 2008, he has been EDA's deputy chief executive for operations among others responsible for internal affairs, space issues and quality management.
