= Madeh Piryonesi =

Kurdish-Canadian writer and engineer

Madeh Piryonesi (Kurdish: مادیح پیریۆنسی) (born in 1991) is a Kurdish-Canadian poet, writer, translator and engineer. He is known for his Kurdish literary works, including his literary translation projects (such as translation of Emily Dickinson's poetry), as well as his award-winning research in civil engineering. He is currently a professor at Toronto Metropolitan University.

== Life ==
Madeh Piryonesi was born in the Kurdish town of Mariwan at the Iranian-Iraqi border. He completed his undergraduate and Master's degree in University of Tehran and, at the age of 25, immigrated to Canada to do a PhD at the University of Toronto. He earned his PhD from University of Toronto and started working as a professor at Toronto Metropolitan University.

== Career ==
Piryonesi is primarily known for his literary translation especially those from and to Kurdish language. In addition to his translations, his own poetry and short stories have been published in Kurdistan, Iran and Canada. In addition to his books, he has published numerous works in Kurdish, English and Persian magazines.

=== Engineering career ===
Piryonesi is an engineer by training. His research in civil engineering has been repeatedly recognized and rewarded in Canada and the US. He is particularly known for his contribution to infrastructure asset management and construction management. His research in civil engineering has won numerous awards and has been recognized by several academic and industrial bodies. He is a recipient of Moselhi Award award, a CSCE award given every two years to a paper that has advanced construction research in North America.

== Awards ==
- ASCE-FHWA LTPP Data Analysis Contest Award
- Moselhi Best Paper award
- CNAM Research Award
