= Sainte-Beuve-en-Rivière =

- Commune
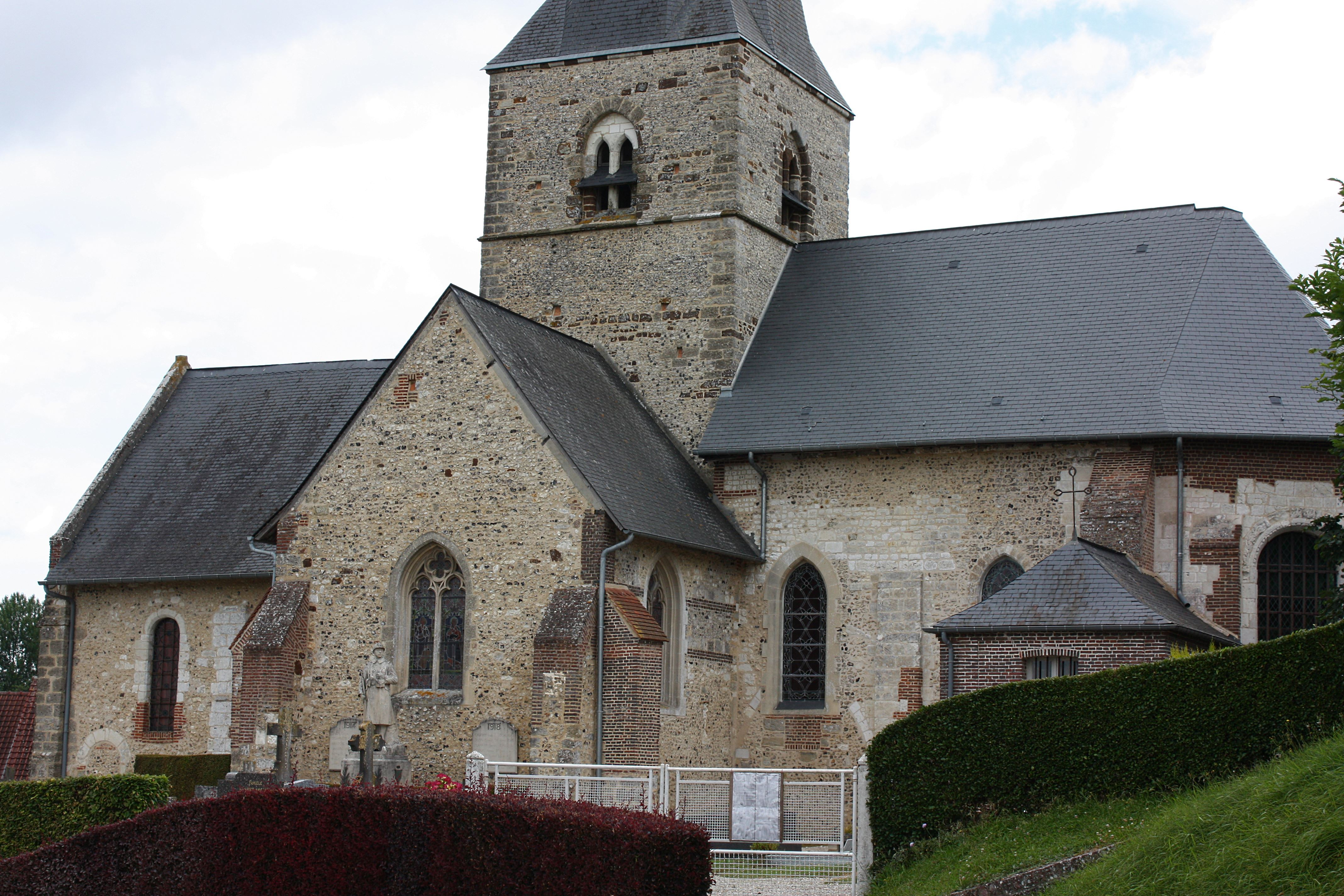
- The church in Sainte-Beuve-en-Rivière
- Location of Sainte-Beuve-en-Rivière
- Location within France Location within Normandy
- Coordinates: 49°45′46″N 1°31′46″E
- Country: France
- Region: Normandy
- Department: Seine-Maritime
- Arrondissement: Dieppe
- Canton: Neufchâtel-en-Bray
- Intercommunality: CC Bray-Eawy

Government
  - Mayor (2026–32): Bernard Bruchet
- Area^{1}: 11.57 km^{2} (4.47 sq mi)
- Elevation: 150 m (490 ft)
- Highest elevation: 229 m (751 ft)
- Lowest elevation: 118 m (387 ft)
- Population (2023): 175
  - Density: 15.1/km^{2} (39.2/sq mi)
- Time zone: UTC+01:00 (CET)
  - Summer (DST): UTC+02:00 (CEST)
- INSEE/Postal code: 76567 /76270
- ^{1} French Land Register data, which excludes lakes, ponds, glaciers > 1 km^{2} (0.386 sq mi or 247 acres) and river estuaries.

Sainte-Beuve-en-Rivière (French pronunciation: [sɛ̃t bœv ɑ̃ ʁivjɛʁ]) is a commune in the Seine-Maritime department in the Normandy region in northern France.

== Geography ==
A forestry and farming village situated by the banks of the river Eaulne in the Pays de Bray, some 19 miles (31 km) southeast of Dieppe at the junction of the D36 and the D929 roads. The A29 autoroute passes through the south-western part of the commune's territory.

== Population ==
Historical population
Year	Pop.	±% p.a.
1968	268	—
1975	208	−3.56%
1982	198	−0.70%
1990	179	−1.25%
1999	162	−1.10%
2007	182	+1.47%
2012	183	+0.11%
2017	183	+0.00%
2023	175	−0.74%
Source: INSEE

== Places of interest ==
- The church of St. Beuve, dating from the twelfth century.

== See also ==
- Communes of the Seine-Maritime department
