= Susan Sauvé Meyer =

Canadian philosopher

Education
- Education: Cornell University (PhD)

Philosophical work
- Era: 21st-century philosophy
- Region: Western philosophy
- Institutions: University of Pennsylvania
- Main interests: ancient philosophy, ethics

Susan Sauvé Meyer is a Canadian philosopher and Professor of Philosophy at the University of Pennsylvania. She is known for her works on ancient philosophy and ethics.

== Early life and education ==
Susan Sauvé Meyer is a Canadian philosopher. She earned a Bachelor of Arts degree from the University of Toronto in 1982. She then received her Ph.D. in philosophy from Cornell University in 1987.

== Books ==
- Plato's Statesman: a Philosophical Discussion, edited by P. Dimas, M. Lane, and S. S. Meyer. Oxford University Press, 2021
- Virtue, Happiness, and Knowledge, edited by D. O. Brink, C. Shields, and S. S. Meyer. Oxford University Press, 2018
- Plato: Laws Books 1 and 2, translated with a commentary. The Clarendon Plato Series. Oxford University Press, 2015
- Ancient Ethics. Routledge, 2008
- Aristotle on Moral Responsibility: Character and Cause. Blackwell 1993; reissued Oxford UP 2011
