= Ville Kolppanen =

Finnish ice hockey player

- Born: September 5, 1992 (age 32); Vaasa, Finland
- Height: 6 ft 1 in (185 cm)
- Weight: 192 lb (87 kg; 13 st 10 lb)
- Position: Goaltender
- Catches: Left
- Metal Ligaen team Former teams: Rungsted Seier Capital; Neftekhimik Nizhnekamsk; Rögle BK
- NHL draft: Undrafted
- Playing career: 2011–present

Ville Kolppanen (born September 5, 1992) is a Finnish professional ice hockey goaltender who is currently playing with Rungsted Seier Capital in the Metal Ligaen.

== Playing career ==
Kolppanen played youth hockey with Tappara before moving to Ilves, and making the Junior A level before moving to North America for one major junior season in appearing with the Lethbridge Hurricanes of the Western Hockey League (WHL) in the 2009–10 season.

Undrafted, Kolppanen returned to Finland with Ilves, making his professional debut in the SM-liiga during the 2010–11 season.

After playing three years in Russia with HC Neftekhimik Nizhnekamsk of the Kontinental Hockey League (KHL), Kolppanen moved to Sweden in agreeing to a contract with Rögle BK of the SHL prior to the 2017–18 season on July 6, 2017.
