= Petri Skriko =

Finnish ice hockey player and coach

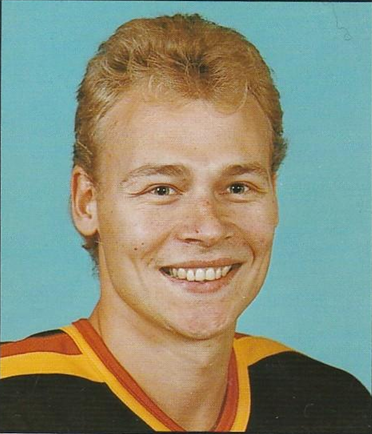
- Skriko in 1986 card
- Born: March 13, 1962 (age 64) Lappeenranta, Finland
- Height: 5 ft 10 in (178 cm)
- Weight: 175 lb (79 kg; 12 st 7 lb)
- Position: Left wing
- Shot: Left
- Played for: Vancouver Canucks; Boston Bruins; Winnipeg Jets; San Jose Sharks; SaiPa
- National team: Finland
- NHL draft: 157th overall, 1981; Vancouver Canucks
- Playing career: 1979–1999

Petri Kalevi Skriko (born March 13, 1962) is a Finnish former professional ice hockey player, best remembered for his seasons starring in the National Hockey League (NHL) for the Vancouver Canucks in the 1980s. He is currently the Head Coach of the Estonia men's national ice hockey team having previously been a scout for the Florida Panthers.

== Playing career ==
Skriko was a teenage phenomenon in Finland for his hometown club SaiPa Lappeenranta as he emerged as a star at the age of 18 and was named the SM-Liiga Rookie of the Year in 1981. That summer, he was drafted into the NHL by the Vancouver Canucks as the 157th pick in the 1981 NHL entry draft.

In ensuing seasons, his stock continued to rise as he developed into one of the top players in Finland. He dominated the 1982 World Junior Championships – earning top forward honours with 15 points in 7 games – and turned in stellar performances at the 1983 World Championships and the 1984 Olympics. In 1983–84, he was named to the SM-Liiga All-star team.

For the 1984–85 season, Skriko signed with the Canucks and went to North America. He enjoyed a solid rookie season, finishing with 21 goals and 35 points in 72 games, good for eighth on the team in scoring.

In 1985–86, Skriko emerged as a star for the Canucks, leading the team with 78 points. From 1985 to 1989, he recorded four consecutive 30-goal seasons and twice led the Canucks in scoring. In November 1986, he recorded three hat tricks in eight days and became the first-ever Canuck named NHL Player of the Month.

In 1989–90, however, his totals fell to 15 goals and 48 points. After a slow start to the 1990–91 season, Skriko was dealt to the Boston Bruins in exchange for a draft pick. His play picked up somewhat in Boston, as he recorded 19 points in 28 games for the Bruins, and added eight more points in the playoffs, en route to the conference finals.

In 1991–92 he was traded again, to the Winnipeg Jets, finishing the season with three goals in 24 games. He signed with the San Jose Sharks for 1992–93, but was released two months into the season and returned to Europe.

After a brief stint back in the SM-Liiga, Skriko moved to the Danish league with Herning IK in 1993. He would be one of the best players ever to play in Denmark, helping his team to four championships and earning two Player-of-the-Year honours. He retired in 1999, but continued on as the team's head coach, winning another title in that capacity in 2001. He then returned to Finland to coach SaiPa for three seasons.

In nine seasons in the NHL, Skriko recorded 183 goals and 222 assists for 405 points in 541 games, along with 246 penalty minutes. Including his time in Europe, he spent 20 seasons as a pro, recording over 1200 points in more than 1000 games.

== International career ==
Petri Skriko
Medal record

World Junior Championships
Silver medal – second place	1981	Finland
Bronze medal – third place	1982	Finland

Skriko is one of the most decorated players in Finnish international hockey history. He would help Team Finland to a Silver medal at the 1981 World Junior Ice Hockey Championships, and a Bronze at the 1982 World Juniors, where he was named the tournament's top forward. He represented Finland at the 1984 Winter Olympics - again leading the team in scoring - and the 1992 Winter Olympics. He would also play in the 1983, 1985, and 1987 World Championships, and the 1987 and 1991 Canada Cups. Altogether, he appeared in 55 senior international games for Finland, recording 17 goals and 33 points.

== Awards and achievements ==
- SM-liiga Rookie of the Year (1980–81)
- SM-liiga All-Star Team (1983–84)
- Top Forward and Tournament All-Star, 1982 World Junior Ice Hockey Championships
- Vancouver Canucks' leading scorer (1985–86, 1988–89)
- Molson Cup winner for Vancouver Canucks (most three-stars selections, 1986–87)
- First Finnish player ever to play for the Vancouver Canucks
- First Vancouver Canuck ever named NHL Player of the Month (November 1986)
- Most hat-tricks in a season by a Vancouver Canuck (4, 1986–87)
- 10th all-time in Canuck scoring (373 points)
- Denmark Player of the Year (1994–95, 1996–97)
- #9 jersey retired by SaiPa Lappeenranta

== Career statistics ==
=== Regular season and playoffs ===
			Regular season					Playoffs
Season	Team	League	GP	G	A	Pts	PIM	GP	G	A	Pts	PIM
1979–80	SaiPa	FIN.2	36	25	20	45	8	—	—	—	—	—
1980–81	SaiPa	SM-l	36	20	13	33	14	—	—	—	—	—
1981–82	SaiPa	SM-l	33	19	27	46	24	—	—	—	—	—
1982–83	SaiPa	SM-l	36	23	12	35	12	2	0	0	0	2
1983–84	SaiPa	SM-l	32	25	26	51	13	—	—	—	—	—
1984–85	Vancouver Canucks	NHL	72	21	14	35	10	—	—	—	—	—
1985–86	Vancouver Canucks	NHL	80	38	40	78	34	3	0	0	0	0
1986–87	Vancouver Canucks	NHL	76	33	41	74	44	—	—	—	—	—
1987–88	Vancouver Canucks	NHL	73	30	34	64	32	—	—	—	—	—
1988–89	Vancouver Canucks	NHL	74	30	36	66	57	7	1	5	6	0
1989–90	Vancouver Canucks	NHL	77	15	33	48	36	—	—	—	—	—
1990–91	Vancouver Canucks	NHL	20	4	4	8	8	—	—	—	—	—
1990–91	Boston Bruins	NHL	28	5	14	19	9	18	4	4	8	4
1991–92	Boston Bruins	NHL	9	1	0	1	6	—	—	—	—	—
1991–92	Winnipeg Jets	NHL	15	2	3	5	4	—	—	—	—	—
1992–93	San Jose Sharks	NHL	17	4	3	7	6	—	—	—	—	—
1992–93	Kiekko-Espoo	SM-l	18	5	4	9	8	—	—	—	—	—
1993–94	Herning IK	DNK	35	37	40	77	20	—	—	—	—	—
1994–95	Herning IK	DNK	42	45	57	102	22	—	—	—	—	—
1995–96	Herning IK	DNK	39	40	55	95	30	—	—	—	—	—
1996–97	Herning IK	DNK	48	49	60	109	57	—	—	—	—	—
1997–98	Herning IK	DNK	47	38	58	96	43	—	—	—	—	—
1998–99	Herning IK	DNK	38	26	44	70	14	—	—	—	—	—
SM-l totals			155	92	82	174	71	2	0	0	0	2
NHL totals			541	183	222	405	246	28	5	9	14	4
DNK totals			249	235	314	549	186	—	—	—	—	—

=== International ===
Year	Team	Event	GP	G	A	Pts	PIM
1980	Finland	EJC	5	3	1	4	15
1981	Finland	WJC	5	3	3	6	10
1982	Finland	WJC	7	8	7	15	4
1983	Finland	WC	10	4	2	6	6
1984	Finland	OG	6	6	4	10	8
1987	Finland	CC	5	0	1	1	2
1987	Finland	WC	10	1	1	2	2
1991	Finland	CC	6	3	2	5	4
1992	Finland	OG	8	1	4	5	4
Junior totals			17	14	11	25	29
Senior totals			55	17	16	33	26
