= Mario Simioni =

Canadian-Italian ice hockey player and coach

- Born: April 1, 1963 (age 63) Toronto, Ontario, Canada
- Height: 6 ft 1 in (185 cm)
- Weight: 205 lb (93 kg; 14 st 9 lb)
- Position: Left wing
- Shot: Right
- Played for: Colorado Flames; Salt Lake Golden Eagles; Moncton Golden Flames; HC Asiago; Vojens IK; Cardiff Devils; Odense Bulldogs
- National team: Italy
- NHL draft: 99th overall, 1981; Calgary Flames
- Playing career: 1983–2000

Mario Simioni (born April 1, 1963) is a Canadian-Italian professional ice hockey coach and former professional ice hockey player. He has been serving as head coach of the Frederikshavn White Hawks since May 2016.

== Playing career ==
Born in Toronto, Ontario, Canada, Simioni was drafted by the Calgary Flames in the 1981 NHL Draft (5th round, 99th overall), but never played in the National Hockey League. However, he saw action for the Colorado Flames, then Calgary's CHL affiliate, in 1982-83 and 1983-84. He split the 1984-85 season between the Salt Lake Golden Eagles of the IHL and the Moncton Golden Flames of the AHL, before continuing his pro career in Europe. Simioni signed with Asiago of the Italian Serie A and would dominate the league in scoring during his seven-year stint. A Canadian of Italian descent, he was named to the Italian national team, representing the country at three World Championships (two in Group B, 1992 in the highest division).

From 1994 to 1998, Simioni played for Vojens IK, continuing his scoring prowess in the Danish league. He then spent the 1998-99 campaign with the Cardiff Devils of the British Ice Hockey Superleague and the 1999-00 season with the Odense Bulldogs of Denmark. In Odense, he served as player-coach and put an end to his playing career in the year 2000.

== Career statistics ==
			Regular season					Playoffs
Season	Team	League	GP	G	A	Pts	PIM	GP	G	A	Pts	PIM
1980–81	Toronto Marlboros	OHL	63	19	27	46	63	—	—	—	—	—
1981–82	Toronto Marlboros	OHL	68	58	60	118	88	—	—	—	—	—
1982–83	Toronto Marlboros	OHL	66	62	59	121	67	—	—	—	—	—
1982–83	Colorado Flames	CHL	6	3	3	6	0	4	2	0	2	2
1983–84	Colorado Flames	CHL	54	16	21	37	35	5	0	3	3	2
1984–85	Salt Lake Golden Eagles	IHL	10	2	9	11	2	—	—	—	—	—
1984–85	Moncton Golden Flames	AHL	38	4	8	12	6	—	—	—	—	—
1985–86	HC Asiago	Italy	36	55	60	115	36	—	—	—	—	—
1986–87	HC Asiago	Italy	42	62	39	101	52	—	—	—	—	—
1987–88	HC Asiago	Italy	36	37	52	89	40	9	16	6	22	10
1988–89	HC Asiago	Italy	44	73	58	131	44	—	—	—	—	—
1989–90	HC Asiago	Italy	41	58	52	110	27	—	—	—	—	—
1990–91	HC Asiago	Italy	36	41	34	75	4	6	5	9	14	2
1991–92	HC Asiago	Italy	17	21	12	33	4	11	8	12	20	10
1991–92	HC Asiago	Alpenliga	18	25	29	54	6	—	—	—	—	—
1994–95	Vojens IK	Denmark	41	46	39	85	36	—	—	—	—	—
1995–96	Vojens IK	Denmark	40	43	46	89	75	—	—	—	—	—
1996–97	Vojens IK	Denmark	40	53	34	87	139	—	—	—	—	—
1997–98	Vojens Lions	Denmark	38	34	21	55	85	—	—	—	—	—
1997–98	HC Asiago	Italy	5	2	1	3	6	—	—	—	—	—
1998–99	Cardiff Devils	BISL	36	15	12	27	16	8	2	2	4	2
1999–00	Odense Bulldogs	Denmark	36	32	36	68	84	—	—	—	—	—
Italy totals			257	349	308	657	213	26	29	27	56	22

== Coaching career ==
Simioni focused on coaching at Odense after serving as player-coach in 1999-00. In his five-year stint with the Bulldogs, he guided the team to the playoff-finals in 2002 and 2003, while winning the 2003 Danish Cup competition.

In April 2004, Simioni was appointed head coach of German first-division side Krefeld Pinguine, but was sacked only some months later, in October, after having won only three of the ten opening games of the 2004-05 season. He returned to Denmark and took over head coaching duties at SønderjyskE in December 2005, kicking off a "golden era". Under Simioni's guidance, the club which he had played for in the late 1990s (named Vojens IK back then) won four Danish championships (2006, 2009, 2010, 2013), four bronze medals (2007, 2008, 2011, 2012), three Danish Cup titles (2010, 2011, 2013) and one bronze medal in the 2010-11 IIHF Continental Cup. He parted ways with SønderjyskE following the 2012-13 season.

In August 2014, Simioni accepted the head coaching job at HC Bozen of the Austrian Hockey League, he was released in February 2015. In April 2015, he was named head coach of Danish outfit Herning Blue Fox and led the team to a finals appearance in the 2015-16 season, where they fell short to Esbjerg Energy. Simioni left Herning after one year to join the coaching staff of the Hamburg Freezers of the Deutsche Eishockey Liga (DEL) in Germany as an assistant to Serge Aubin. However, the Hamburg team folded in May 2016 and a couple of days after this announcement had been made, Simioni was named head coach of the Frederikshavn White Hawks of the Danish top-flight Metal Ligaen.
