= Leonids Tambijevs =

Latvian ice hockey player

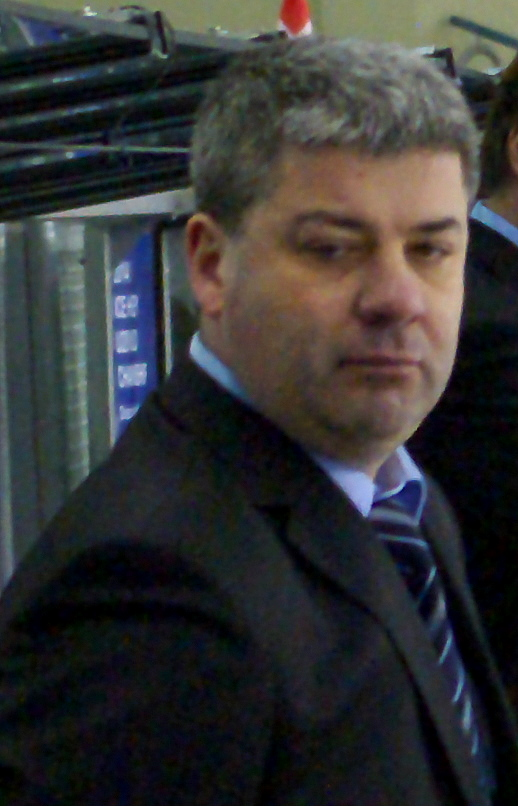
- Born: September 26, 1970 (age 55) Riga, Latvian SSR, Soviet Union
- Height: 5 ft 9 in (175 cm)
- Weight: 176 lb (80 kg; 12 st 8 lb)
- Position: Left wing
- Shot: Right
- Played for: SKA Leningrad; Pārdaugava Riga; Essamika Ogre; Hvidovre Ishockey; Lukko; Iserlohn Roosters; Rodovre Mighty Bulls; Amur Khabarovsk; Tappara; EHC Basel; DHK Latgale
- Current KHL coach: Dynamo Moscow
- Coached for: HK Riga; Latvia (junior); Saryarka Karagandy; Dinamo Saint Petersburg; Metallurg Novokuznetsk; Admiral Vladivostok
- National team: Latvia
- Playing career: 1988–2008
- Coaching career: 2010–present

Leonīds Tambijevs (born September 26, 1970) is a former professional ice hockey left winger, currently serving as the head coach of Dynamo Moscow in the Kontinental Hockey League (KHL).

== Playing career ==
Tambijevs began his career with the Dinamo Riga youth team. As a junior he played with several Latvian teams. He debuted at the USSR Tier III level with RASMS-Energo, but soon joined USSR top level team Leningrad SKA for the 1990/1991 season. He then returned to Riga where had played until 1995 with ex-USSR league premier level teams Stars Riga and Pardaugava Riga.

After the disbanding of Riga premier league teams in 1995, Tambijevs moved abroad and played with Denmark team Hvidovre IK. A career highpoint includes a spot with Finnish SM-liiga at Rauma Lukko. He then played in Germany, Denmark, Russia, Switzerland, Italy, and spent his final season with EV Zeltweg in Austria

Tambijevs has an extensive Latvian national ice hockey team career. He made his debut at the first official renewed national teams' game in 1992 and has played at every world championship, Olympic qualifier and Olympic Games for the Latvian team until 2007. On 13 April 2007 in a Latvian game against Finland, Tambijevs and Aleksandrs Semjonovs became the first two players to play 200 games for the Latvia national team. He has played the most games and scored the most points for the national team.

== Coaching career ==
Tambijevs has previously coached HK Riga, Latvia men's national junior ice hockey team, Saryarka Karagandy, Dinamo Saint Petersburg, Metallurg Novokuznetsk, Admiral Vladivostok. Currently, he is the head coach of the Dynamo Moscow.

== Career statistics ==
=== Regular season and playoffs ===
			Regular season					Playoffs
Season	Team	League	GP	G	A	Pts	PIM	GP	G	A	Pts	PIM
1988–89	RASMS–Energo Rīga	URS.3	28	6	1	7	12	—	—	—	—	—
1989–90	SKA–2 Leningrad	URS.3	66	30	11	41	46	—	—	—	—	—
1990–91	SKA Leningrad	URS	23	7	6	13	12	—	—	—	—	—
1990–91	SKA–2 Leningrad	URS.3	1	0	0	0	0	—	—	—	—	—
1991–92	Stars Rīga	CIS	9	1	1	2	4	—	—	—	—	—
1991–92	RASMS Rīga	CIS.3	22	9	4	13	18	—	—	—	—	—
1992–93	Pārdaugava Rīga	IHL	41	11	8	19	36	2	0	0	0	2
1992–93	Pārdaugava–2 Rīga	LAT	11	9	15	24	14	—	—	—	—	—
1993–94	Pārdaugava Rīga	IHL	42	18	10	28	22	2	0	2	2	0
1993–94	Essamika Ogre	LAT	—	—	—	—	—		3	1	4
1994–95	Pārdaugava Rīga	IHL	47	21	7	28	56	—	—	—	—	—
1995–96	Hvidovre IK	DEN	42	61	38	99	74	—	—	—	—	—
1995–96	Essamika Ogre	LAT	—	—	—	—	—		5	8	13
1996–97	Hvidovre IK	DEN	43	37	35	72	102	—	—	—	—	—
1997–98	Hvidovre IK	DEN	20	29	13	42	18	—	—	—	—	—
1997–98	Lukko	SM-l	25	12	10	22	14	—	—	—	—	—
1998–99	Lukko	SM-l	53	26	23	49	97	—	—	—	—	—
1999–2000	Lukko	SM-l	52	19	15	34	48	4	0	0	0	2
2000–01	Iserlohn Roosters	DEL	60	19	18	37	82	—	—	—	—	—
2001–02	Rødovre Mighty Bulls	DEN	39	29	29	58	48	9	4	6	10
2002–03	Torpedo Nizhny Novgorod	RUS.2	41	30	27	57	28	12	7	10	17	4
2002–03	Torpedo–2 Nizhny Novgorod	RUS.3	2	1	3	4	0	—	—	—	—	—
2003–04	Amur Khabarovsk	RSL	13	0	4	4	8	—	—	—	—	—
2003–04	Tappara	SM-l	12	4	5	9	12	—	—	—	—	—
2003–04	EHC Chur	SUI.2	8	7	6	13	12	5	4	3	7	4
2004–05	EHC Chur	SUI.2	43	21	39	60	54	—	—	—	—	—
2005–06	EHC Basel	NLA	21	3	11	14	24	1	0	1	1	0
2005–06	EHC Olten	SUI.2	3	2	1	3	0	—	—	—	—	—
2006–07	HC Merano	ITA.2	30	21	32	53	22	11	11	8	19	14
2006–07	DHK Latgale	LAT	2	1	2	3	6	—	—	—	—	—
2007–08	EV Zeltweg	AUT.2	32	24	28	52	30	5	1	2	3	35
IHL totals			130	50	25	75	114	4	0	2	2	2
DEN totals			144	156	115	271	242	9	4	6	10	—
SM-l totals			142	61	53	114	171	4	0	0	0	2

=== International ===
Year	Team	Event	GP	G	A	Pts	PIM
1993	Latvia	WC C	7	6	11	17	2
1993	Latvia	OGQ	4	1	1	2	2
1994	Latvia	WC B	5	2	0	2	2
1995	Latvia	WC B	7	6	6	12	8
1996	Latvia	WC B	7	3	2	5	6
1996	Latvia	OGQ	4	6	8	14
1997	Latvia	WC	8	4	1	5	2
1998	Latvia	WC	6	3	1	4	6
1999	Latvia	WC	6	3	1	4	2
1999	Latvia	WC Q	3	1	0	1	6
2000	Latvia	WC	6	1	2	3	2
2001	Latvia	OGQ	3	0	0	0	0
2001	Latvia	WC	6	1	3	4	0
2002	Latvia	OG	4	1	2	3	2
2002	Latvia	WC	6	1	0	1	2
2003	Latvia	WC	6	1	1	2	6
2004	Latvia	WC	7	0	1	1	0
2005	Latvia	OGQ	3	0	1	1	0
2005	Latvia	WC	6	1	2	3	10
2006	Latvia	OG	5	1	0	1	8
2006	Latvia	WC	6	1	2	3	6
2007	Latvia	WC	5	1	1	2	6
Senior totals			122	44	50	94	78
