= Aleksandrs Semjonovs =

Latvian ice hockey player

- Born: June 8, 1972 (age 52); Riga, Soviet Union
- Height: 5 ft 11 in (180 cm)
- Weight: 198 lb (90 kg; 14 st 2 lb)
- Position: Centre
- Shot: Left
- Swe Div 1 team: IFK Arboga IK
- National team: Latvia
- Playing career: 1990–2010

Aleksandrs Semjonovs (born 8 June 1972) is a retired professional ice hockey centre who is currently general manager of IFK Arboga IK in the Swedish Division 1 league.

Semjonovs has played in many different countries throughout his career, playing in Latvia, Russia, Finland, Denmark, Sweden and Germany.

Semjonovs also played for the Latvian national ice hockey team and has played more games for his country (209) than any other player.

== Career statistics ==
=== Regular season and playoffs ===
			Regular season					Playoffs
Season	Team	League	GP	G	A	Pts	PIM	GP	G	A	Pts	PIM
1990–91	SKA–2 Leningrad	URS.3	63	9	6	15	32	—	—	—	—	—
1991–92	SKA–2 St. Petersburg	CIS.3	4	0	0	0	2	—	—	—	—	—
1991–92	Stars Rīga	Soviet	1	0	0	0	0	—	—	—	—	—
1991–92	RASMS Rīga	CIS.3	28	9	9	18	38	—	—	—	—	—
1992–93	Pārdaugava Rīga	IHL	43	8	4	12	14	2	0	0	0	0
1992–93	Pārdaugava–2 Rīga	Latvia	10	7	7	14	6	—	—	—	—	—
1993–94	Pārdaugava Rīga	IHL	40	14	10	24	17	2	2	0	2	0
1994–95	Pārdaugava Rīga	IHL	47	12	2	14	52	—	—	—	—	—
1995–96	Hermes	FIN.2	43	20	20	40	106	—	—	—	—	—
1996–97	Vojens IK	DEN	44	42	18	60	28	—	—	—	—	—
1997–98	Vojens Lions	DEN	38	31	17	48	44	—	—	—	—	—
1998–99	IF Björklöven	SEL	48	14	13	27	111	—	—	—	—	—
1999–2000	Heilbronner EC	DEU.2	50	14	25	39	32	—	—	—	—	—
2000–01	IF Björklöven	SEL	46	9	15	24	65	—	—	—	—	—
2001–02	IF Björklöven	Allsv	26	7	17	24	22	—	—	—	—	—
2001–02	IFK Arboga	Allsv	14	3	4	7	12	3	0	2	2	29
2002–03	IFK Arboga	Allsv	38	17	20	37	83	5	2	3	5	6
2003–04	IFK Arboga	Allsv	45	17	20	37	73	—	—	—	—	—
2003–04	Leksands IF	SEL	2	1	0	1	0	—	—	—	—	—
2004–05	IFK Arboga	Allsv	43	15	14	29	36	8	3	4	7	4
2005–06	IFK Arboga	Allsv	21	9	9	18	30	—	—	—	—	—
2005–06	Malmö Redhawks	Allsv	17	5	4	9	14	10	3	4	7	8
2006–07	Herning Blue Fox	DEN	6	2	2	4	62	—	—	—	—	—
2006–07	Traktor Chelyabinsk	RSL	25	1	4	5	30	—	—	—	—	—
2007–08	AaB Ishockey	DEN	44	14	14	28	52	5	1	4	5	2
2008–09	IFK Arboga	SWE.3	35	17	15	32	57	—	—	—	—	—
2009–10	IFK Arboga	SWE.3	39	14	26	40	52	4	2	2	4	16
2010–11	IFK Arboga	SWE.3	36	8	20	28	18	—	—	—	—	—
IHL & RSL totals			155	35	20	55	113	—	—	—	—	—
DEN totals			132	89	51	140	186	5	1	4	5	2
Allsv totals			204	73	88	161	270	26	8	13	21	47

=== International ===
Year	Team	Event	GP	G	A	Pts	PIM
1994	Latvia	WC B	7	6	5	11	8
1995	Latvia	WC B	7	1	2	3	0
1996	Latvia	WC B	6	0	0	0	2
1997	Latvia	WC	8	2	1	3	2
1998	Latvia	WC	6	0	2	2	10
1999	Latvia	WC	6	2	1	3	8
1999	Latvia	WC Q	3	1	0	1	2
2000	Latvia	WC	7	2	1	3	8
2001	Latvia	OGQ	3	0	1	1	2
2001	Latvia	WC	6	4	1	5	2
2002	Latvia	OG	4	1	1	2	2
2002	Latvia	WC	6	1	0	1	2
2003	Latvia	WC	6	0	1	1	4
2005	Latvia	OGQ	3	2	0	2	0
2005	Latvia	WC	6	2	1	3	4
2006	Latvia	OG	5	0	0	0	4
2006	Latvia	WC	6	3	0	3	8
2007	Latvia	WC	6	1	1	2	6
Senior totals			108	28	18	46	80
