= Morten Green =

Danish ice hockey player

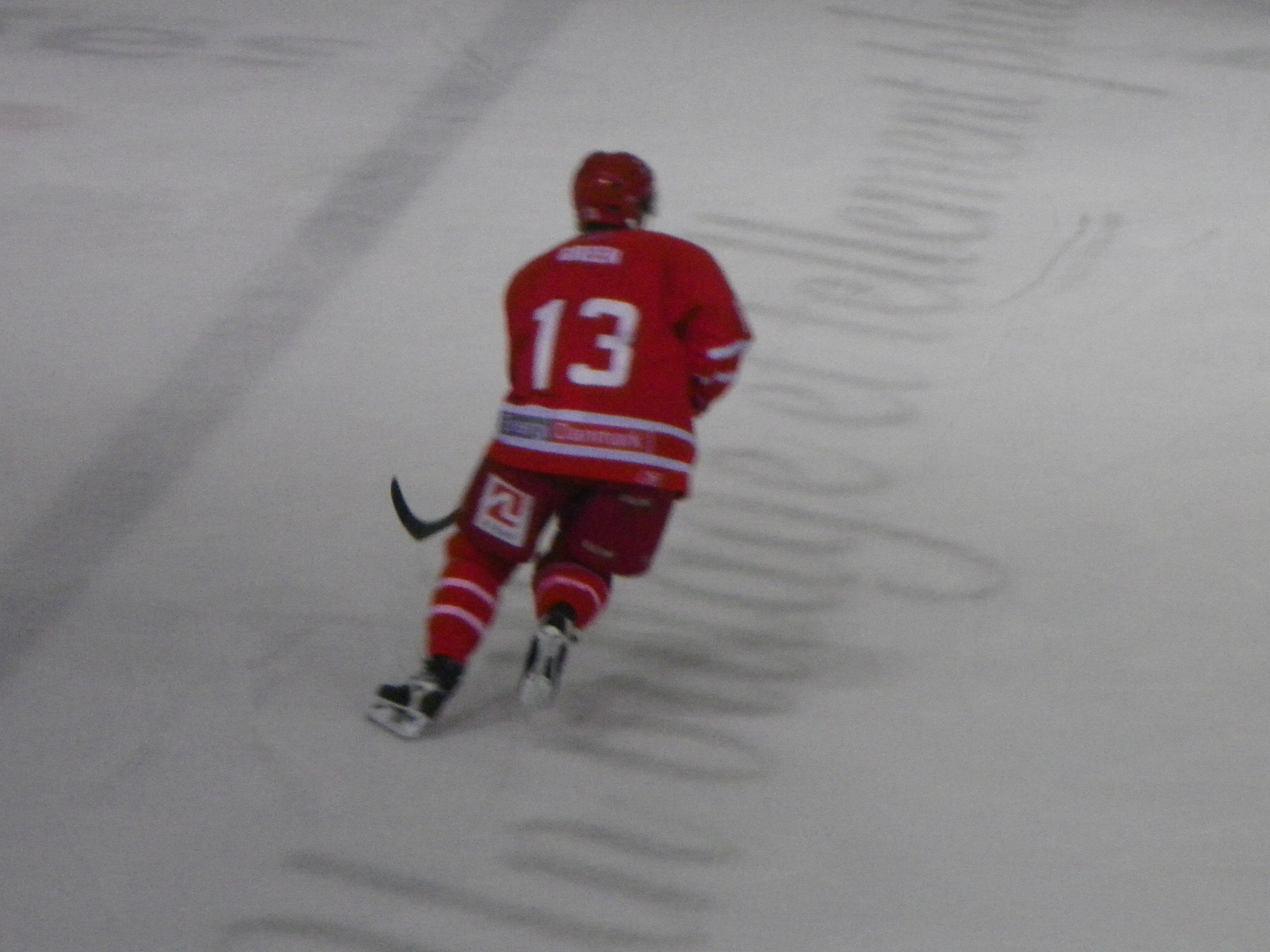
- Born: 19 March 1981 (age 44); Hørsholm, Denmark
- Height: 6 ft 0 in (183 cm)
- Weight: 194 lb (88 kg; 13 st 12 lb)
- Position: Forward
- Shot: Left
- Played for: Leksands IF; Modo Hockey; Hannover Scorpions; Schwenninger Wild Wings; Rungsted IK
- National team: Denmark
- Playing career: 1996–2018

Morten Green (born 19 March 1981) is a Danish former professional ice hockey player who lastly played for the Danish team Rungsted IK. He participated at the 2010 IIHF World Championship as a member of the Danish national team.

Green joined the Schwenninger Wild Wings on a one-year contract from the Hannover Scorpions on 8 July 2013. After two seasons with the Wild Wings, Green was released as a free agent.

== Career statistics ==
			Regular season					Playoffs
Season	Team	League	GP	G	A	Pts	PIM	GP	G	A	Pts	PIM
1996–97	Rungsted Cobras	Denmark	51	17	11	28	22	—	—	—	—	—
1997–98	Rungsted Cobras	Denmark	42	14	16	30	10	—	—	—	—	—
1998–99	Rungsted Cobras	Denmark	40	20	22	42	12	—	—	—	—	—
1999–00	Leksands IF J20	J20 SuperElit	19	8	17	25	12	2	0	1	1	0
1999–00	Leksands IF	Elitserien	40	0	5	5	0	—	—	—	—	—
2000–01	IF Troja-Ljungby	Allsvenskan	42	18	25	43	53	—	—	—	—	—
2001–02	IF Troja-Ljungby	Allsvenskan	43	19	25	44	47	—	—	—	—	—
2002–03	Modo Hockey	Elitserien	45	3	6	9	12	5	1	0	1	0
2002–03	Örnsköldsviks SK	Allsvenskan	4	1	6	7	8	—	—	—	—	—
2003–04	Modo Hockey J20	J20 SuperElit	2	1	2	3	2	—	—	—	—	—
2003–04	Modo Hockey	Elitserien	44	6	10	16	36	6	1	0	1	2
2003–04	IF Sundsvall Hockey	Allsvenskan	5	2	5	7	2	—	—	—	—	—
2004–05	Modo Hockey J20	J20 SuperElit	3	1	3	4	2	—	—	—	—	—
2004–05	Modo Hockey	Elitserien	26	0	3	3	20	2	0	0	0	0
2004–05	Rögle BK	Allsvenskan	16	4	16	20	14	—	—	—	—	—
2005–06	Modo Hockey	Elitserien	50	8	12	20	20	5	0	1	1	4
2006–07	Leksands IF	HockeyAllsvenskan	43	20	30	50	32	10	2	4	6	4
2007–08	Leksands IF	HockeyAllsvenskan	38	14	27	41	10	10	2	6	8	4
2008–09	Leksands IF	HockeyAllsvenskan	45	16	33	49	55	10	3	7	10	8
2009–10	Malmö Redhawks	HockeyAllsvenskan	51	19	22	41	32	—	—	—	—	—
2010–11	Malmö Redhawks	HockeyAllsvenskan	50	13	33	46	49	—	—	—	—	—
2011–12	Malmö Redhawks	HockeyAllsvenskan	52	11	12	23	28	—	—	—	—	—
2012–13	Hannover Scorpions	DEL	51	6	20	26	42	—	—	—	—	—
2013–14	Schwenninger Wild Wings	DEL	52	13	24	37	14	—	—	—	—	—
2014–15	Schwenninger Wild Wings	DEL	52	2	12	14	26	—	—	—	—	—
2015–16	Rungsted Seier Capital	Denmark	45	7	22	29	24	4	1	2	3	4
2016–17	Rungsted Seier Capital	Denmark	41	16	24	40	53	4	0	2	2	0
2017–18	Rungsted Seier Capital	Denmark	32	9	23	32	26	14	5	12	17	8
Elitserien totals			205	17	36	53	88	18	2	1	3	6
DEL totals			155	21	56	77	82	—	—	—	—	—
Denmark totals			251	83	118	201	147	22	6	16	22	12
HockeyAllsvenskan totals			279	93	157	250	206	30	7	18	24	18
