= Jukka Vilander =

Finnish ice hockey player

- Born: 27 November 1962 (age 63) Naantali, Finland
- Height: 5 ft 11 in (180 cm)
- Weight: 183 lb (83 kg; 13 st 1 lb)
- Position: Forward
- Shot: Left
- Played for: SM-liiga; HC TPS; AL-Bank Ligaen; EfB Ishockey
- National team: Finland
- Playing career: 1979–2001

Jukka Vilander
Medal record

Men's ice hockey

European Championship
Bronze medal – third place	1986 Soviet Union	Team

SM-Liiga
Gold medal – first place	1989	Team
Gold medal – first place	1990	Team
Gold medal – first place	1991	Team
Gold medal – first place	1993	Team
Silver medal – second place	1982	Team
Silver medal – second place	1985	Team
Silver medal – second place	1994	Team

Danish Eliteserien
Gold medal – first place	1996	Team

Jukka Vilander (born 27 November 1962) is a Finnish former professional ice hockey forward. He is a four time Finnish champion with HC TPS (1989, 1990, 1991, 1993) and is 1996 Danish Champion with EfB Ishockey. He has made SM-liiga All-Star Team in 1988–89 season. Vilander has represented Finland men's national ice hockey team in three Ice Hockey World Championships.

== Honours and accolades ==
- Won the Danish Champion in 1995–96.
- Won the Finnish Champion (Kanada-malja) in 1988–89, 1989–90, 1990–91 and 1992–93.
- SM-Liiga Runners-up in 1981–82, 1984–85 and 1993–94.
- Raimo Kilpiö trophy in 1987, 1988 and 1989.
- Aarne Honkavaara trophy in 1989.
- Kultainen kypärä in 1989.
- Matti Keinonen trophy in 1989.
- IIHF European Cup trophy in 1993.
- IIHF European Cup Runners-up in 1989–90,
- Vilander played as the Finland national team for the 3 times in World Championships, 1986, 1989 and 1990.

== Career statistics ==
=== Regular season and playoffs ===
			Regular season					Playoffs
Season	Team	League	GP	G	A	Pts	PIM	GP	G	A	Pts	PIM
1979–80	TPS	SM-l	1	0	0	0	0	—	—	—	—	—
1981–82	TPS	SM-l	11	0	0	0	0	7	0	1	1	0
1982–83	TPS	SM-l	35	6	1	7	0	3	1	0	1	0
1983–84	TPS	SM-l	32	10	10	20	8	10	3	3	6	0
1984–85	TPS	SM-l	34	15	10	25	6	5	2	3	5	0
1985–86	TPS	SM-l	35	24	15	39	6	7	2	2	4	2
1986–87	TPS	SM-l	44	27	21	48	14	5	0	0	0	2
1987–88	TPS	SM-l	44	25	37	62	6	—	—	—	—	—
1988–89	TPS	SM-l	42	43	23	66	6	9	4	5	9	2
1989–90	TPS	SM-l	44	20	24	44	12	9	5	4	9	4
1990–91	TPS	SM-l	44	16	19	35	22	9	5	3	8	4
1991–92	TPS	SM-l	44	24	19	43	6	3	0	0	0	0
1992–93	TPS	SM-l	48	22	15	37	2	12	4	1	5	0
1993–94	TPS	SM-l	48	17	12	29	12	11	1	5	6	0
1995–96	Esbjerg IK	DNK	44	46	43	89	4	—	—	—	—	—
1996–97	Esbjerg IK	DNK	50	36	49	85	22	—	—	—	—	—
1997–98	Esbjerg IK	DNK	47	17	28	45	18	—	—	—	—	—
1998–99	Esbjerg IK	DNK	42	18	24	42	10	—	—	—	—	—
2000–01	Herlev Eagles	DNK	5	1	2	3	0	—	—	—	—	—
SM-l totals			506	249	206	455	100	90	27	27	54	14
DNK totals			188	118	146	264	54	—	—	—	—	—

=== International ===
Year	Team	Event	GP	G	A	Pts	PIM
1986	Finland	WC	10	2	0	2	4
1989	Finland	WC	10	6	4	10	0
1990	Finland	WC	10	4	1	5	2
Senior totals			30	12	5	17	6
