= Vilander =

Vilander is a Finnish surname. Notable people with the surname include:

- Jukka Vilander (born 1962), Finnish ice hockey player
- Toni Vilander (born 1980), Finnish race car driver

== See also ==
- Wilander
