= Patrick Bjorkstrand =

Danish professional ice hockey forward

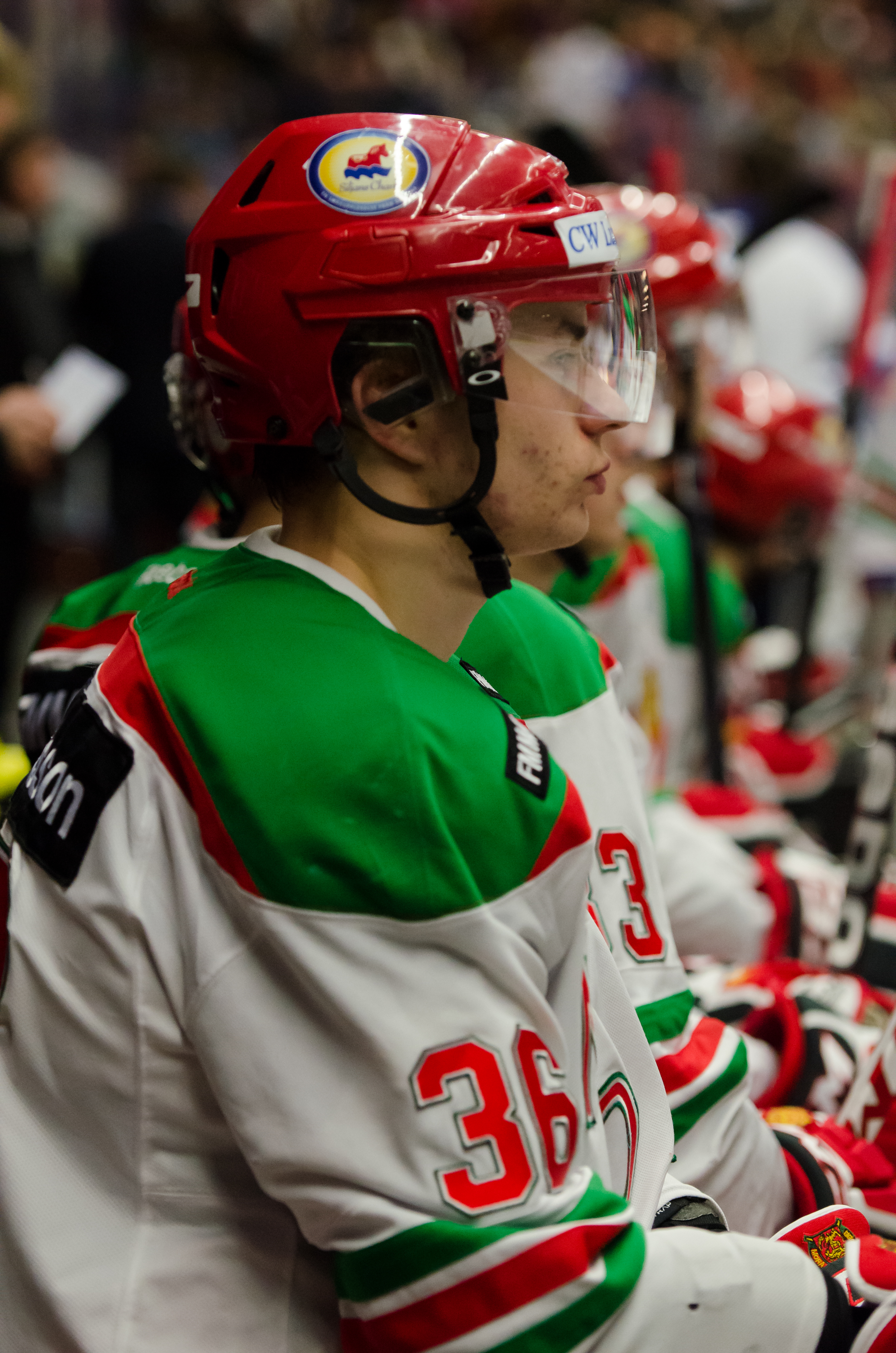
- Bjorkstrand with Mora IK in 2012
- Born: 1 July 1992 (age 33) Herning, Denmark
- Height: 6 ft 0 in (183 cm)
- Weight: 192 lb (87 kg; 13 st 10 lb)
- Position: Forward
- Shoots: Left
- Metal team Former teams: Aalborg Pirates; Herning Blue Fox; Medveščak Zagreb; SaiPa; Ontario Reign; KooKoo; Thomas Sabo Ice Tigers; TPS; EC VSV
- National team: Denmark
- NHL draft: Undrafted
- Playing career: 2009–present

Patrick Bjorkstrand (born 1 July 1992) is a Danish professional ice hockey forward currently playing for Aalborg Pirates of the Metal Ligaen (DEN). He formerly played with the Ontario Reign of the AHL while under contract to the Los Angeles Kings of the National Hockey League (NHL).

He is the son of hockey coach Todd Bjorkstrand and the older brother of Oliver Bjorkstrand.

== Playing career ==
Bjorkstrand made his first steps at the senior level in his native Denmark with Herning Blue Fox of the Metal Ligaen. He won the Danish national championship with Herning in 2011 and 2012. He spent the 2012–13 campaign with Mora IK of the Swedish HockeyAllsvenskan. From 2013 to 2016, Bjorkstrand played for Medveščak Zagreb of the Kontinental Hockey League (KHL), interrupted by a Finland stint with SaiPa in the course of the 2014–15 season.

On 14 July 2016 he signed a one-year, entry-level contract with the Los Angeles Kings of the National Hockey League (NHL) and spent the season with the Kings' American Hockey League (AHL) affiliate Ontario Reign. After the season Bjorkstrand returned to Finland and signed with KooKoo of Liiga on 3 August 2017. He left Finland in February 2018 to head to Germany, where he signed with the Nürnberg Ice Tigers of the DEL.

In the off-season, Bjorkstrand returned for a third stint in the Finnish Liiga, agreeing as a free agent to a one-year contract with HC TPS on 5 June 2018. He contributed with his two-way play, recording 10 goals and 20 points in 59 games in the 2018–19 season.

On 5 June 2019 Bjorkstrand left the Liiga as a free agent, signing an initial one-year contract with Austrian club, EC Panaceo VSV, of the EBEL.

== International play ==
Bjorkstrand competed in the 2013, 2014, 2015, and 2016 IIHF World Championship as a member of the Denmark men's national ice hockey team.

== Career statistics ==
=== Regular season and playoffs ===
			Regular season					Playoffs
Season	Team	League	GP	G	A	Pts	PIM	GP	G	A	Pts	PIM
2009–10	Herning Blue Fox	DEN	32	4	5	9	20	10	1	1	2	0
2010–11	Herning Blue Fox	DEN	38	3	17	20	16	14	2	8	10	0
2011–12	Herning Blue Fox	DEN	36	9	25	34	30	17	3	8	11	10
2012–13	Mora IK	Allsv	51	6	7	13	12	—	—	—	—	—
2013–14	Medveščak Zagreb	KHL	54	4	9	13	14	4	0	0	0	0
2014–15	Medveščak Zagreb	KHL	55	7	8	15	2	—	—	—	—	—
2014–15	SaiPa	Liiga	11	2	0	2	0	7	1	2	3	2
2015–16	Medveščak Zagreb	KHL	57	13	9	22	12	—	—	—	—	—
2016–17	Ontario Reign	AHL	42	8	4	12	10	2	0	0	0	0
2017–18	KooKoo	Liiga	52	14	23	37	24	—	—	—	—	—
2017–18	Thomas Sabo Ice Tigers	DEL	3	0	2	2	0	9	1	1	2	0
2018–19	TPS	Liiga	59	10	10	20	14	5	1	1	2	0
2019–20	EC VSV	EBEL	46	15	20	35	10	3	0	0	0	0
2020–21	EC VSV	ICEHL	23	3	7	10	10	—	—	—	—	—
2021–22	Aalborg Pirates	DEN	40	17	27	44	20	10	3	2	5	2
KHL totals			166	24	26	50	28	4	0	0	0	0
Liiga totals			122	26	33	59	38	12	2	3	5	2

=== International ===
Year	Team	Event	GP	G	A	Pts	PIM
2009	Denmark	U18-D1	5	2	3	5	0
2010	Denmark	U18-D1	5	2	4	6	2
2010	Denmark	WJC-D1	5	3	2	5	2
2011	Denmark	WJC-D1	5	3	4	7	2
2012	Denmark	WJC	6	1	5	6	4
2013	Denmark	OGQ	3	0	0	0	0
2013	Denmark	WC	7	0	0	0	2
2014	Denmark	WC	7	1	3	4	2
2015	Denmark	WC	7	1	0	1	2
2016	Denmark	WC	8	0	1	1	4
2022	Denmark	WC	7	1	0	1	0
Junior totals			26	11	18	29	10
Senior totals			39	3	4	7	10
