= 1993 IIHF European Cup =

European ice hockey tournament

The 1993 European Cup was the 29th edition of the European Cup, IIHF's premier European club ice hockey tournament. The season started on October 8, 1993, and finished on December 30, 1993.

The tournament was won by TPS, who beat Dynamo Moscow in the final. ((Mike Gregorio, Goalie))

== First group round ==
=== Group A ===
(Esbjerg, Denmark)

Team #1	Score	Team #2
Vålerenga IF (Norway)	2:2	(Netherlands) Flame Guards Nijmegen
Esbjerg IK (Denmark)	18:3	(Spain) CHH Txuri Urdin
Esbjerg IK (Denmark)	7:4	(Netherlands) Flame Guards Nijmegen
Vålerenga IF (Norway)	15:0	(Spain) CHH Txuri Urdin
Flame Guards Nijmegen (Netherlands)	8:2	(Spain) CHH Txuri Urdin
Esbjerg IK (Denmark)	4:8	(Norway) Vålerenga IF

=== Group A standings ===
Rank	Team	Points
1	(Norway) Vålerenga IF	5
2	(Denmark) Esbjerg IK	4
3	(Netherlands) Flame Guards Nijmegen	3
4	(Spain) CHH Txuri Urdin	0

=== Group B ===
(Trenčín, Slovakia)

Team #1	Score	Team #2
Tivali Minsk (Belarus)	6:0	(Estonia) Narva Kreenholm
HC Dukla Trenčín (Slovakia)	15:1	(Bulgaria) Slavia Sofia
Tivali Minsk (Belarus)	11:0	(Bulgaria) Slavia Sofia
HC Dukla Trenčín (Slovakia)	10:0	(Estonia) Narva Kreenholm
Narva Kreenholm (Estonia)	6:3	(Bulgaria) Slavia Sofia
HC Dukla Trenčín (Slovakia)	1:3	(Belarus) Tivali Minsk

=== Group standings ===
Rank	Team	Points
1	(Belarus) Tivali Minsk	6
2	(Slovakia) HC Dukla Trenčín	4
3	(Estonia) Narva Kreenholm	2
4	(Bulgaria) Slavia Sofia	0

=== Group C ===
(Jesenice, Slovenia)

Team #1	Score	Team #2
EC Villacher SV (Austria)	14:0	(Croatia) KHL Zagreb
HK Acroni Jesenice (Slovenia)	3:5	(Kazakhstan) Torpedo Ust-Kamenogorsk
HK Acroni Jesenice (Slovenia)	9:4	(Croatia) KHL Zagreb
Torpedo Ust-Kamenogorsk (Kazakhstan)	5:2	(Austria) EC Villacher SV
Torpedo Ust-Kamenogorsk (Kazakhstan)	21:1	(Croatia) KHL Zagreb
HK Acroni Jesenice (Slovenia)	7:2	(Austria) EC Villacher SV

=== Group C standings ===
Rank	Team	Points
1	(Kazakhstan) Torpedo Ust-Kamenogorsk	6
2	(Slovenia) HK Acroni Jesenice	4
3	(Austria) EC Villacher SV	2
4	(Croatia) KHL Zagreb	0

=== Group D ===
(Riga, Latvia)

Team #1	Score	Team #2
Sokil Kyiv (Ukraine)	9:1	(United Kingdom) Cardiff Devils
Pārdaugava Rīga (Latvia)	19:0	(Lithuania) SC Energija
Sokil Kyiv (Ukraine)	11:1	(Lithuania) SC Energija
Pārdaugava Rīga (Latvia)	11:4	(United Kingdom) Cardiff Devils
Cardiff Devils (United Kingdom)	10:3	(Lithuania) SC Energija
Pārdaugava Rīga (Latvia)	2:2	(Ukraine) Sokil Kyiv

=== Group D standings ===
Rank	Team	Points
1	(Latvia) Pārdaugava Rīga	5
2	(Ukraine) Sokil Kyiv	5
3	(United Kingdom) Cardiff Devils	2
4	(Lithuania) SC Energija	0

=== Group E ===
(Budapest, Hungary)

Team #1	Score	Team #2
Sparta Praha (Czech Republic)	9:3	(Romania) HC Steaua București
Ferencvárosi TC (Hungary)	51:1	(Turkey) Ankara Büyükşehir
Sparta Praha (Czech Republic)	16:1	(Turkey) Ankara Büyükşehir
Ferencvárosi TC (Hungary)	10:3	(Romania) HC Steaua București
HC Steaua București (Romania)	16:1	(Turkey) Ankara Büyükşehir
Ferencvárosi TC (Hungary)	3:19	(Czech Republic) Sparta Praha

=== Group E standings ===
Rank	Team	Points
1	(Czech Republic) Sparta Praha	6
2	(Hungary) Ferencvárosi TC	4
3	(Romania) HC Steaua București	2
4	(Turkey) Ankara Büyükşehir	0

(Poland) Podhale Nowy Targ, (Italy) HC Devils Milano, (France) Rouen HC, (Switzerland) EHC Kloten, (Finland) TPS, (Russia) Dynamo Moscow, (Sweden) Brynäs IF : bye

== Second group round ==
=== Group F ===
(Milan, Italy)

Team #1	Score	Team #2
Sparta Praha (Czech Republic)	9:2	(Poland) Podhale Nowy Targ
HC Devils Milano (Italy)	11:1	(Denmark) Esbjerg IK
Sparta Praha (Czech Republic)	5:3	(Denmark) Esbjerg IK
HC Devils Milano (Italy)	8:0	(Poland) Podhale Nowy Targ
Esbjerg IK (Denmark)	4:4	(Poland) Podhale Nowy Targ
HC Devils Milano (Italy)	3:1	(Czech Republic) Sparta Praha

=== Group F standings ===
Rank	Team	Points
1	(Italy) HC Devils Milano	6
2	(Czech Republic) Sparta Praha	4
3	(Denmark) Esbjerg IK	1
4	(Poland) Podhale Nowy Targ	1

=== Group G ===
(Rouen, France)

Team #1	Score	Team #2
Dynamo Moscow (Russia)	7:3	(Latvia) Pārdaugava Rīga
Rouen HC (France)	4:4	(Slovakia) HC Dukla Trenčín
Dynamo Moscow (Russia)	2:1	(Slovakia) HC Dukla Trenčín
Rouen HC (France)	1:2	(Latvia) Pārdaugava Rīga
HC Dukla Trenčín (Slovakia)	1:1	(Latvia) Pārdaugava Rīga
Rouen HC (France)	1:3	(Russia) Dynamo Moscow

=== Group G standings ===
Rank	Team	Points
1	(Russia) Dynamo Moscow	6
2	(Latvia) Pārdaugava Rīga	3
3	(Slovakia) HC Dukla Trenčín	2
4	(France) Rouen HC	1

=== Group H ===
(Kloten, Canton of Zürich, Switzerland)

Team #1	Score	Team #2
Brynäs IF (Sweden)	3:2	(Ukraine) Sokil Kyiv
EHC Kloten (Switzerland)	5:2	(Kazakhstan) Torpedo Ust-Kamenogorsk
Torpedo Ust-Kamenogorsk (Kazakhstan)	6:3	(Ukraine) Sokil Kyiv
EHC Kloten (Switzerland)	2:2	(Sweden) Brynäs IF
Brynäs IF (Sweden)	3:2	(Kazakhstan) Torpedo Ust-Kamenogorsk
EHC Kloten (Switzerland)	2:2	(Ukraine) Sokil Kyiv

=== Group H standings ===
Rank	Team	Points
1	(Sweden) Brynäs IF	5
2	(Switzerland) EHC Kloten	4
3	(Kazakhstan) Torpedo Ust-Kamenogorsk	2
4	(Ukraine) Sokil Kyiv	1

=== Group I ===
(Turku, Finland)

Team #1	Score	Team #2
Tivali Minsk (Belarus)	6:0	(Slovenia) HK Acroni Jesenice
TPS (Finland)	11:1	(Norway) Vålerenga IF
TPS (Finland)	11:2	(Slovenia) HK Acroni Jesenice
Tivali Minsk (Belarus)	6:3	(Norway) Vålerenga IF
Vålerenga IF (Norway)	3:3	(Slovenia) HK Acroni Jesenice
TPS (Finland)	2:2	(Belarus) Tivali Minsk

=== Group I standings ===
Rank	Team	Points
1	(Finland) TPS	5
2	(Belarus) Tivali Minsk	5
3	(Norway) Vålerenga IF	1
4	(Slovenia) HK Acroni Jesenice	1

(Sweden) Malmö IF, (Germany) Düsseldorfer EG : bye

== Final stage ==
(Düsseldorf, North Rhine-Westphalia, Germany)

=== Group A ===
Team #1	Score	Team #2
TPS (Finland) Head coach - Vladimir Yurzinov (Russia)	6:4 (1:2, 4:0, 1:2) 0:1 (5:50, PP) De Angelis, 1:1 (8:00) Nurminen(Pirjetä), 1:2 (14:13) Iovio, 2:2 (21:15) Lehtinen, 3:2 (30:56) Keskinen, 4:2 (33:26 PP) Vilander(Virta), 5:2 (38:54) Pirjetä(Kiprusoff), 6:2 (50:20, PP) Virta(Vuori), 6:3 (51:45) Iovio, 6:4 (52:13) Rucchin(Iob).	(Italy) HC Devils Milano Head coach - Dan Hobér (Sweden)
Düsseldorfer EG (Germany)	1:2 (0:1, 1:0, 0:1)	(Belarus) Tivali Minsk
TPS (Finland)	4:0 (2:0, 1:0, 2:0)	(Belarus) Tivali Minsk
Düsseldorfer EG (Germany)	1:3 (0:2, 1:0, 0:1)	(Italy) HC Devils Milano
HC Devils Milano (Italy)	5:5 (4:2, 1:2, 0:1)	(Belarus) Tivali Minsk
Düsseldorfer EG (Germany)	5:4 (2:2, 0:1, 3:1)	(Finland) TPS

=== Group A standings ===
Rank	Team	Points
1	(Finland) TPS	4
2	(Italy) HC Devils Milano	3
3	(Belarus) Tivali Minsk	3
4	(Germany) Düsseldorfer EG	2

=== Group B ===
Team #1	Score	Team #2
Malmö IF (Sweden)	5:4 (0:1, 1:1, 4:2)	(Sweden) Brynäs IF
Dynamo Moscow (Russia)	8:3 (4:1, 1:1, 3:1)	(Czech Republic) Sparta Praha
Dynamo Moscow (Russia)	5:1 (0:0, 2:0, 3:1)	(Sweden) Brynäs IF
Malmö IF (Sweden)	5:1 (4:0, 0:0, 1:1)	(Czech Republic) Sparta Praha
Dynamo Moscow (Russia)	2:1 (1:0, 0:1, 1:0)	(Sweden) Malmö IF
Brynäs IF (Sweden)	5:1 (2:1, 1:0, 2:0)	(Czech Republic) Sparta Praha

=== Group B standings ===
Rank	Team	Points
1	(Russia) Dynamo Moscow	6
2	(Sweden) Malmö IF	4
3	(Sweden) Brynäs IF	2
4	(Czech Republic) Sparta Praha	0

=== Third place match ===
Team #1
Malmö IF (Sweden)

Head Coach - Timo Lahtinen (Finland)

Score
4:3 (1:1, 0:1, 2:1, 1:0)

1:0 (1:17) Švehla (Sylvegård), 1:1 (12:55) Ville 1:2 (24:41, РР) Chitaroni (Circelli. Iovio). 2:2 (46:56) Olund (Nurgren), 2:3 (54:45) Di Muzio (Ville, frolov) 3:3 (59:29) Hansson (Sundström, Persson), 4:3 (68:52, РР) Svanberg. 

Team #2
(Italy) HC Devils Milano

Head Coach - Dan Hobér (Sweden)

=== Final ===
Team #1	Score	Team #2
TPS (Finland) Vladimir Yurzinov (Russia)	4:3 (0:1, 2:2, 2:0) 0:1 (12:55) Vorobyov (Gribko. Voronov), 1:1 (28:33) Nurminen (Kiprusoff), 1:2 (29:41) Kozlov (Ilyin), 1:3 (33:02) Zdanovsky (Prokopyev), 2:3 (36:37, бол.) Lehtinen (Smirnov), 3:3 (52:52) Vilander (Vuori), 4:3 (58:35) Keskinen (Jantunen).	(Russia) Dynamo Moscow Igor Tuzik
