= Petter Hansson (ice hockey) =

Swedish ice hockey player

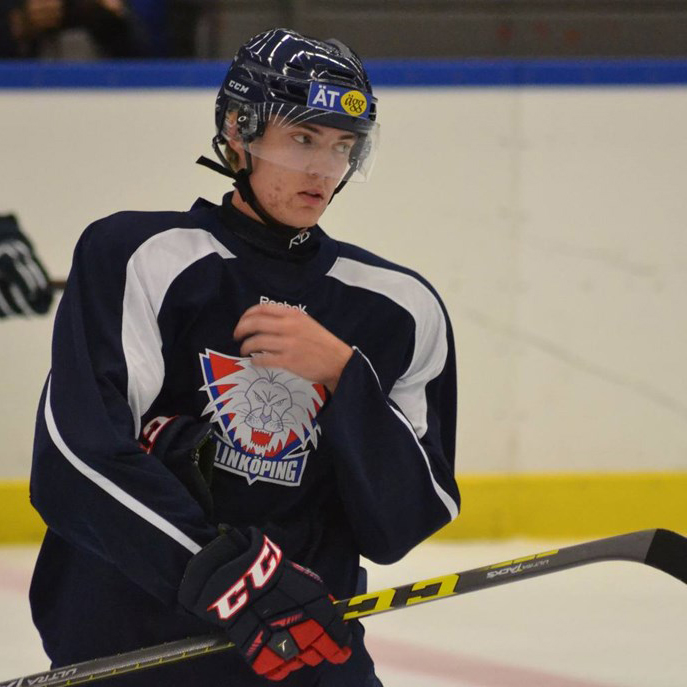
- Hansson with Linköping HC in 2015
- Born: 16 May 1996 (age 29) Gislaved, Sweden
- Height: 6 ft 1 in (185 cm)
- Weight: 187 lb (85 kg; 13 st 5 lb)
- Position: Defence
- Shoots: Left
- Metal team Former teams: Herning Blue Fox; Linköping HC; EC KAC
- NHL draft: 202nd overall, 2015; New York Islanders
- Playing career: 2014–present

Petter Hansson (born 16 May 1996) is a Swedish professional ice hockey defenceman. He is currently playing under contract with Herning Blue Fox in the Metal Ligaen (DEN). He was selected in the 7th round, 202nd overall, in the 2015 NHL entry draft by the New York Islanders.

== Playing career ==
Hansson made his Swedish Hockey League debut playing with Linköpings HC during the 2014–15 SHL season. During the 2016–17 season, Hansson played 22 games for 1 assist with Linköpings HC while also appearing on loan with Västerviks IK in the Allsvenskan with 9 points in 28 games.

On May 23, 2017, Hansson left Linköpings HC and agreed to a two-year contract with Södertälje SK of the Allsvenskan. During the 2018-19 season, Hansson was briefly loaned to Huddinge IK in the Hockeyettan, returning to the Allsvenskan after 5 games.

== Career statistics ==
			Regular season					Playoffs
Season	Team	League	GP	G	A	Pts	PIM	GP	G	A	Pts	PIM
2011–12	Gislaveds SK	Div.1	20	0	0	0	0	2	0	0	0	0
2012–13	Linköpings HC	J20	1	0	0	0	0	—	—	—	—	—
2013–14	Linköpings HC	J20	19	1	3	4	6	1	0	1	1	0
2014–15	Linköpings HC	J20	38	15	19	34	32	1	0	0	0	0
2014–15	Linköpings HC	SHL	15	0	1	1	2	1	0	0	0	0
2015–16	Linköpings HC	J20	12	1	3	4	12	4	0	1	1	0
2015–16	Linköpings HC	SHL	8	0	0	0	0	—	—	—	—	—
2015–16	VIK Västerås HK	Allsv	2	0	0	0	0	—	—	—	—	—
2015–16	IK Oskarshamn	Allsv	7	0	0	0	0	—	—	—	—	—
2016–17	Linköpings HC	J20	1	0	0	0	0	—	—	—	—	—
2016–17	Linköpings HC	SHL	22	0	1	1	2	—	—	—	—	—
2016–17	Västerviks IK	Allsv	28	1	8	9	14	5	0	2	2	0
2017–18	Södertälje SK	Allsv	51	1	2	3	14	5	0	1	1	2
2018–19	Södertälje SK	Allsv	36	3	3	6	49	—	—	—	—	—
2018–19	Huddinge IK	Div.1	5	0	1	1	0	—	—	—	—	—
2019–20	EC KAC	EBEL	41	1	2	3	14	3	0	1	1	2
2019–20	EC KAC II	AlpsHL	5	0	2	2	4	—	—	—	—	—
2020–21	GSK Hockey	Div.2	1	1	1	2	0	—	—	—	—	—
2020–21	Herning Blue Fox	DEN	34	4	23	27	18	4	0	1	1	8
2021–22	Herning Blue Fox	DEN	43	9	16	25	16	4	0	2	2	0
SHL totals			45	0	2	2	4	1	0	0	0	0
