= Todd Bjorkstrand =

American ice hockey player and coach

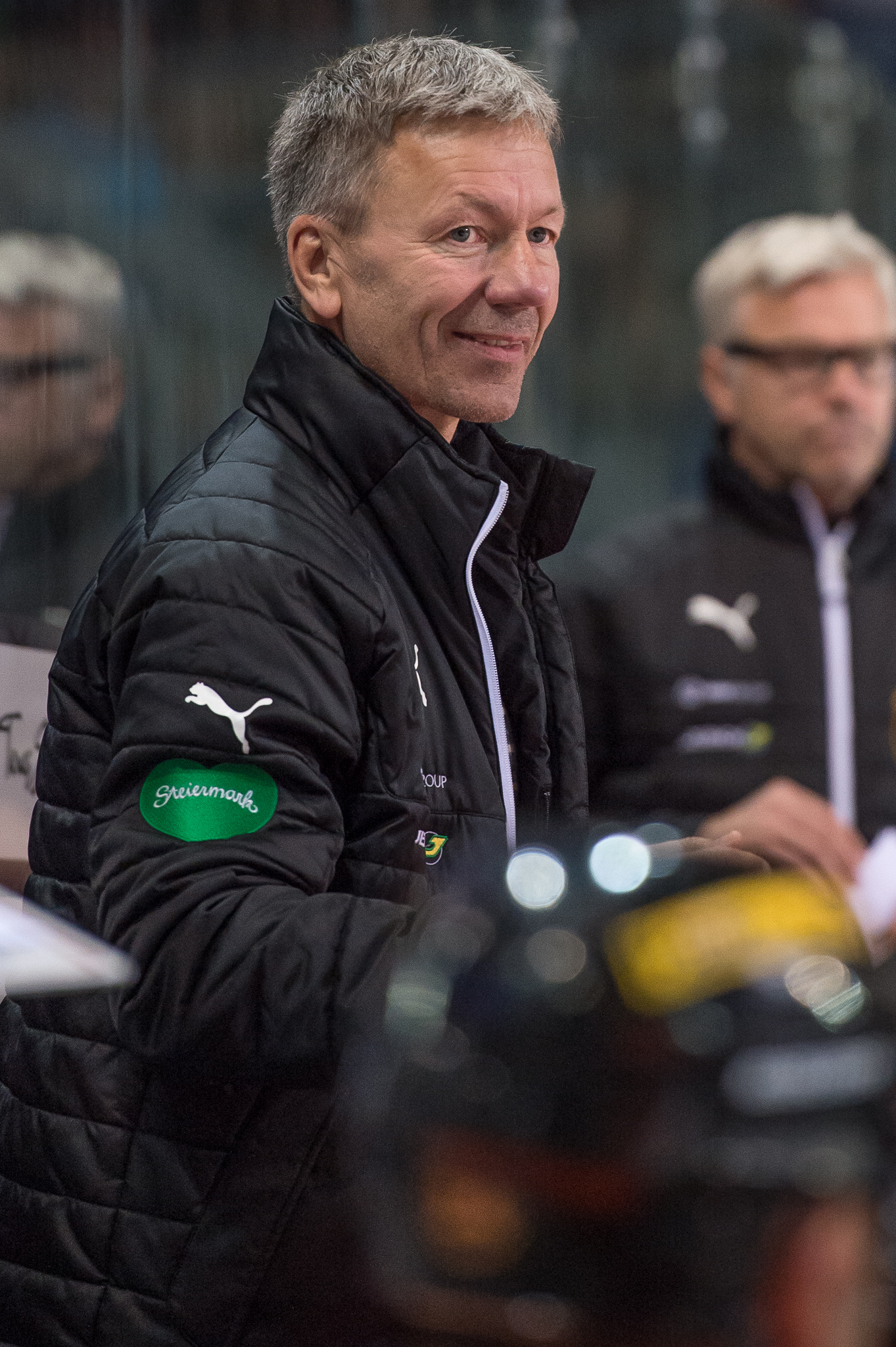
- Born: October 14, 1962 (age 64) Minneapolis, Minnesota, U.S.
- Height: 5 ft 10 in (178 cm)
- Weight: 196 lb (89 kg; 14 st 0 lb)
- Position: Centre
- Shot: Left
- Played for: IHL; Fort Wayne Komets; Saginaw Generals; Indianapolis Checkers; ACHL; Pinebridge Bucks; Erie Golden Blades; Denmark; Herning Blue Fox
- NHL draft: Undrafted
- Playing career: 1984–2002

Todd Bjorkstrand (born October 14, 1962) is an American professional ice hockey coach and a former professional ice hockey player. He is currently serving as head coach for the HK Dukla Trenčín in Slovakia.

== Playing career ==
Bjorkstrand attended the University of Maine between 1980 and 1984.

Following four seasons of playing minor league hockey in the United States, playing in the ACHL and IHL, Bjorkstrand moved to Denmark in 1988 where he enjoyed a 14-year career in the Danish League with the Herning Blue Fox, winning seven Danish championships with the club. He finished his career as the Danish league’s all-time leading goal scorer and all-time assist leader and had his number 22 retired by the Blue Fox.

== Coaching career ==
After retiring as a player, Bjorkstrand was named head coach of the Herning Blue Fox in 2002. He remained in the job until 2014 and guided the team to six Danish championship titles. Bjorkstrand also developed Denmark's first ever NHL player, Frans Nielsen, followed by others including Peter Regin, Nicklas Jensen, Frederik Andersen and his sons Oliver Bjorkstrand and Patrick Bjorkstrand.

Between 2010 and 2012, Bjorkstrand coached the Danish national junior team, guiding the team to winning gold at the 2011 IIHF U20 World Championship Division I, while earning qualification to the 2012 World Juniors.

Prior to the 2014–15 season, Bjorkstrand was named head coach and manager of the Graz 99ers of the Erste Bank Hockey League, the premier league in Austria. He was sacked in October 2015 after a run of just five points in eight games.

In May 2016, he signed with Herning Blue Fox of the Danish Metal Ligaen to coach at old stomping ground. He parted company with the team in March 2017.

In May 2018, Bjorkstrand signed a two-year contract with the Stavanger Oilers of Norway.

== Personal life ==
Bjorkstrand's great-grandparents emigrated to the United States from Norway and Sweden. His son, Oliver Bjorkstrand, plays for the Danish national team and was selected by the Columbus Blue Jackets in the 2013 NHL entry draft. Oliver is currently a forward for the New York Rangers. Another son, Patrick Bjorkstrand, is also an ice hockey player.

== Awards and honors ==
Award	Year
ACHL Rookie of the Year	1984–85
Danish League Player of the Year	1993–94
Danish League Player of the Year	2000–01
