= Oliver Bjorkstrand =

Danish ice hockey player (born 1995)

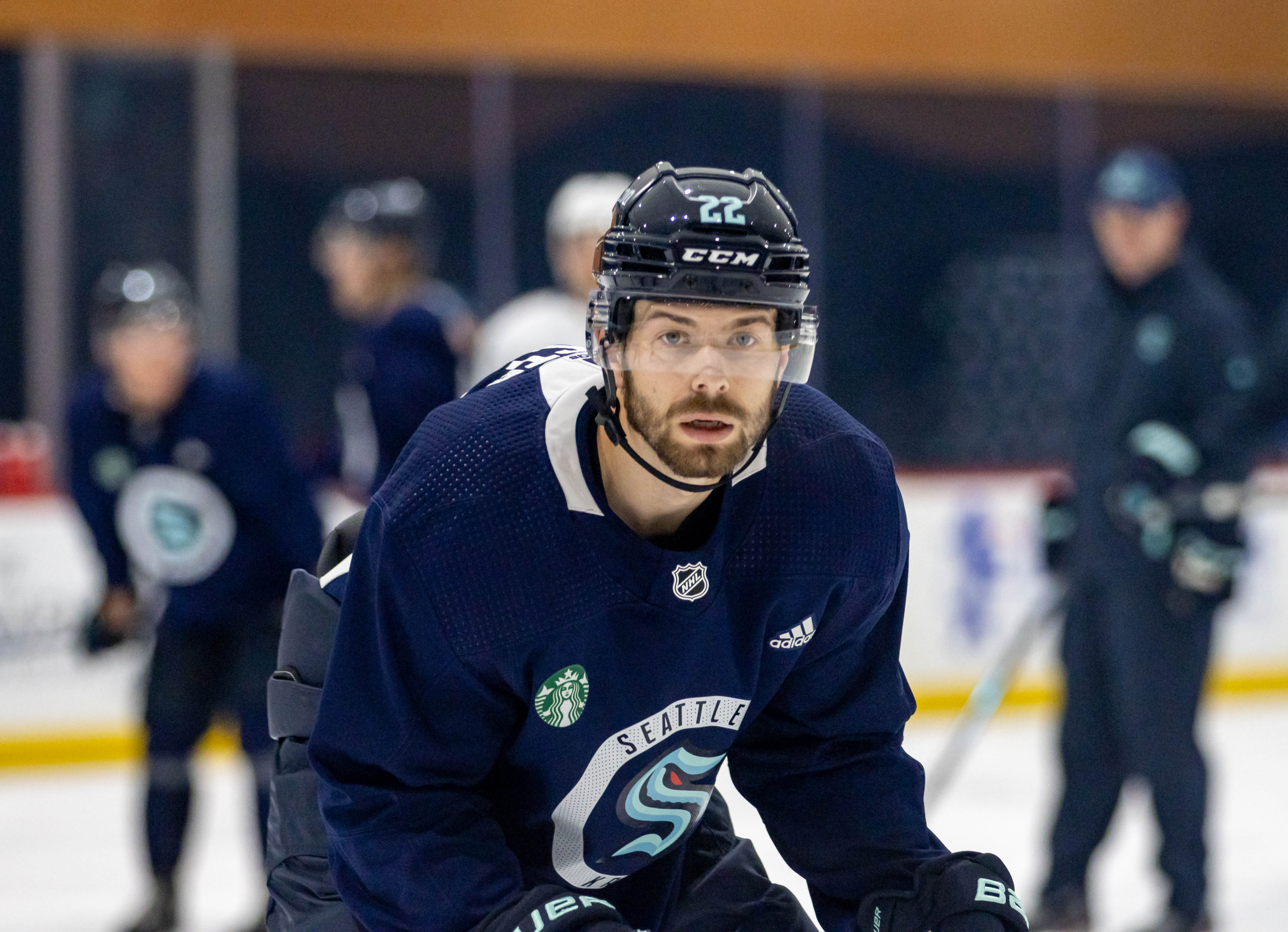
- Bjorkstrand with the Seattle Kraken in 2022
- Born: 10 April 1995 (age 31) Herning, Denmark
- Height: 6 ft 0 in (183 cm)
- Weight: 174 lb (79 kg; 12 st 6 lb)
- Position: Right wing
- Shoots: Right
- NHL team Former teams: New York Rangers; Herning Blue Fox; Columbus Blue Jackets; Seattle Kraken; Tampa Bay Lightning
- National team: Denmark
- NHL draft: 89th overall, 2013; Columbus Blue Jackets
- Playing career: 2011–present

Oliver Bjorkstrand (born 10 April 1995) is a Danish professional ice hockey player who is a right winger for the New York Rangers of the National Hockey League (NHL). Bjorkstrand was selected by the Columbus Blue Jackets in the third round, 89th overall, of the 2013 NHL entry draft. Bjorkstrand is the son of American hockey coach Todd and the brother of Patrick.

Born and raised in Herning, Bjorkstrand made his AL-Bank Ligaen debut playing with the Herning Blue Fox during the 2011–12 season. He recorded 13 goals and 13 assists for 26 points in 36 games during his rookie season to lead all 16-year-olds in the league in scoring. As a result, he was selected 26th overall by the Portland Winterhawks in the Western Hockey League (WHL) 2012 Import Draft. He spent three seasons with the Winterhawks before beginning his professional career with the Lake Erie Monsters of the American Hockey League.

== Early life ==
Bjorkstrand was born on 10 April 1995, in Herning, Denmark, to parents Todd and Janne. His father, an American citizen, is a former professional hockey player and coach. His older brother Patrick also plays ice hockey. Bjorkstrand was born and raised in Denmark, where he played under the tutelage of his father until he was 17 years old.

== Playing career ==
=== Junior ===
Bjorkstrand made his AL-Bank Ligaen debut playing with the Herning Blue Fox during the 2011–12 season. He recorded 13 goals and 13 assists for 26 points in 36 games during his rookie season to lead all 16-year-olds in the league in scoring. As a result, he was selected 26th overall by the Portland Winterhawks in the Western Hockey League (WHL) 2012 Import Draft. He subsequently joined the team for their 2012–13 season. By December, Bjorkstrand ranked fourth among all WHL rookies with 27 points and was invited to participate in the 2012 CHL/NHL Top Prospects Game. Following the game, Bjorkstrand earned a top 30 mid-term ranking from the NHL Central Scouting Bureau leading up to the 2013 NHL entry draft. He later recorded his first major junior hat-trick during a 7–0 win over the Tri-City Americans. He ended his rookie regular-season campaign leading all WHL rookies with 31 goals and 63 points in 65 games. Bjorkstrand then shared the team's Rookie of the Year award with Seth Jones before leading all rookie skaters with 19 points in 21 playoff games.

Following his rookie season, Bjorkstrand was drafted 89th overall by the Columbus Blue Jackets in the 2013 NHL entry draft. On 26 December 2013, during his second season with the Winterhawks, Bjorkstrand signed a three-year, entry-level contract with the Blue Jackets. At the time of the signing, he had tallied 25 goals and 31 assists for 56 points in 32 games. By March 2014, Bjorkstrand became the second Winterhawk player in three seasons to reach the 50-goal plateau after recording his fourth hat-trick in one season. As a result, he finished the regular season third in scoring with 109 points and was selected for the WHL Western Conference All-Star First Team. Bjorkstrand then helped the Winterhawks win their fourth straight WHL Western Conference Championship by recording 15 goals and 13 assists for 28 points through 14 games.

Bjorkstrand finished his third and final season with the Winterhawks increasing his scoring and offensive ability. During the 2014–15 season, Bjorkstrand led all WHL players in goals and points to earn the Bob Clarke Trophy as the league's leading scorer. He recorded 50 goals in 50 games to become the first WHL player to accomplish the feat since the 2011–12 WHL season. Bjorkstrand also became the first Winterhawk to complete back-to-back 50-goal season since Dennis Holland from 1987-89. He was subsequently unanimously selected to the WHL's Western Conference First All-Star Team, while his teammates voted him the Winterhawks' Most Valuable Player.

=== Professional ===
==== Columbus Blue Jackets ====
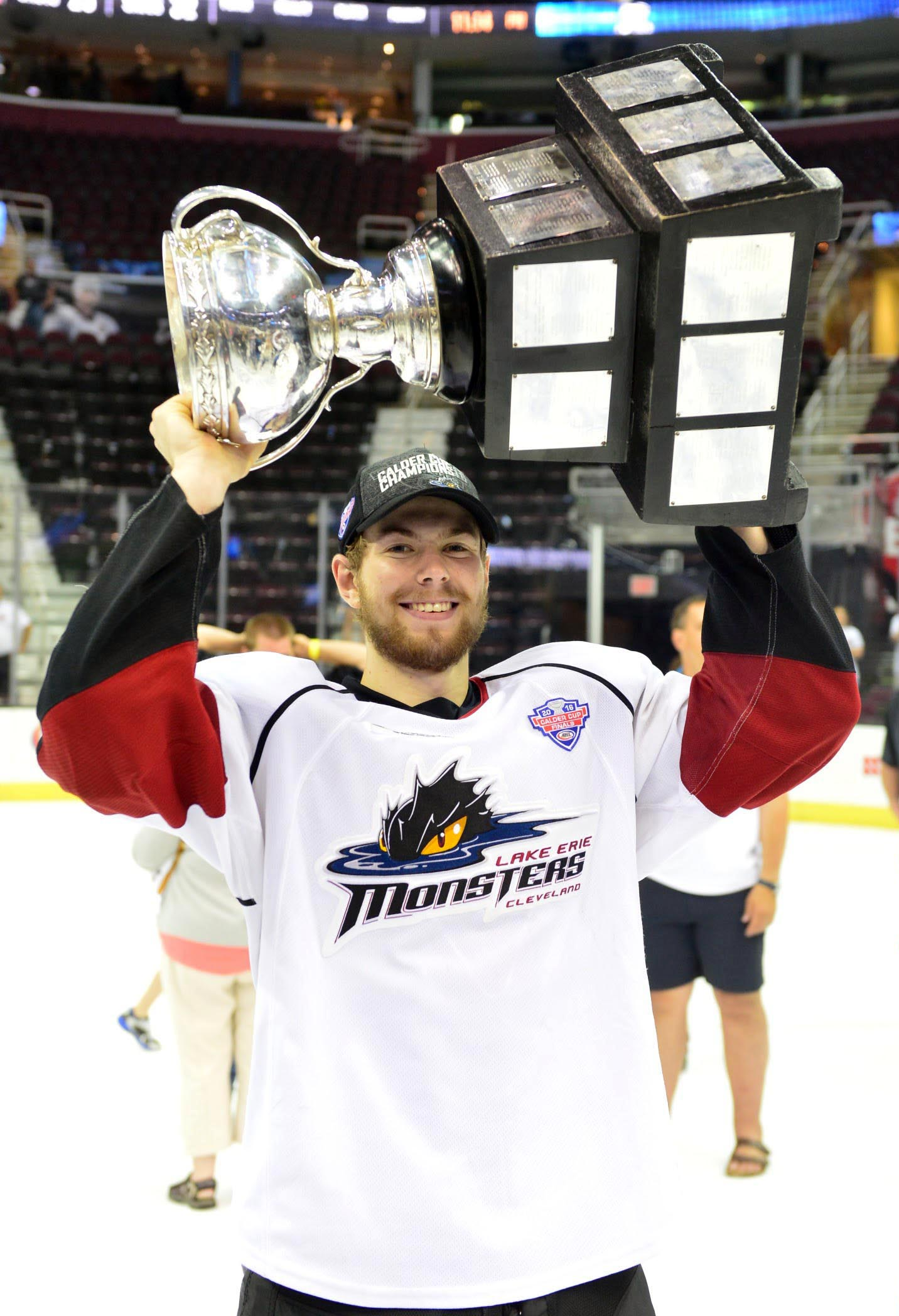
Bjorkstrand with the Lake Erie Monsters in 2016.

Following his career-high third season campaign with the Winterhawks, Bjorkstrand joined the Blue Jackets' American Hockey League (AHL) affiliate, the Lake Erie Monsters, to begin the 2015–16 season. In his first professional season, Bjorkstrand recorded 15 goals and 10 assists for 25 points before being recalled to the NHL on 16 March 2016. He made his NHL debut the following day in a game against the Detroit Red Wings and scored his first and second NHL goals in his second game against the New Jersey Devils. He finished the regular season with the Blue Jackets, recording four goals and eight points in 12 games before returning to the AHL for the franchise's first Calder Cup playoff appearance since 2011.

Upon returning to the AHL, Bjorkstrand helped the Monsters sweep the Rockford IceHogs in the first round by scoring 19 seconds into the third period of Game 4. In Game 1 of the following series against the Grand Rapids Griffins, Bjorkstrand recorded the overtime game-winning goal to lead the Monsters to a win. With assistance from his offensive ability, the Monsters qualified for the Calder Cup Finals against the Hershey Bears where he scored the game-winning goal in the final seconds of overtime in Game 4. This effectively won the Calder Cup for the Monsters, and Bjorkstrand also earned the Jack A. Butterfield Trophy as the playoffs' most valuable player.

Following the Calder Cup win, Bjorkstrand entered training and development camp with high expectations of making the Blue Jackets' 2016–17 opening night roster. During camp, Blue Jackets general manager Jarmo Kekäläinen spoke highly of him, saying: "He's not a big guy, but he's not afraid to play the North American style at all ... it speaks to his character. I love the chip on his shoulder and the way he plays and competes." He was named to the teams' opening night roster but was reassigned to the Cleveland Monsters after playing in three games. During his time in the AHL, Bjorkstrand was also selected for the 2017 AHL All-Star Classic roster. Aside from an emergency call-up in December, he would stay with the Monsters until February after scoring 14 goals and 12 assists in 37 games. Upon returning to the NHL level in February 2017, Bjorkstrand recorded 13 points in 26 games and the move was praised by management as the best move made around the trade deadline. In March, Bjorkstrand was sidelined for six games after suffering a hit from Toronto Maple Leafs player Roman Polák, who was subsequently suspended for two games. He returned to the lineup on 4 April 2017 where he had one shot in 14:12 of ice time in a 4–1 loss to the Pittsburgh Penguins.

Bjorkstrand entered the final year of his entry-level contract playing the full 2017–18 season with the Blue Jackets at the NHL level. Throughout the season, he played mainly on the third or fourth line and was tasked with a checking role. Following the acquisition of Thomas Vanek in February, Bjorkstrand played on a line with Nick Foligno and Sonny Milano. He set a new career-high during the season by recording 11 goals and 29 assists for 40 points in 82 games. His numbers ranked fourth in assists and sixth in points across the Blue Jackets skaters. As the Jackets qualified for the 2018 Stanley Cup playoffs, he recorded three points in six games. He finished the 2017–18 season by signing a three-year contract extension through the 2020–21 season on 15 July 2018.

In the first year of his new contract, Bjorkstrand began studying the playing style of teammate Artemi Panarin, who had a similar build to him. He began the season slow, only scoring three goals in his first 30 games and was made a healthy scratch. After sitting out for four games, head coach John Tortorella returned him to the lineup on 29 November 2018, to replace a "banged up" Anthony Duclair. Following this, he picked up his scoring and had five goals and nine points through the month of February and recording nine goals in the last 10 games of the regular season. As a result, he finished the 2018–19 season with 23 goals and 36 points for his first 20-goal season.

The following year, Bjorkstrand continued his offensive output and was praised by defenseman Zach Werenski for being "a guy that you can count on in every situation". He was moved across various lines throughout the season as Tortorella struggled to finding a suitable center for both Bjorkstrand and Patrik Laine. After recording 12 goals and 11 assists for 23 points through 36 games, he was placed on injured reserve in December 2019 after suffering a rib/cartilage contusion with oblique strain during a game against the New Jersey Devils. Upon returning to the lineup, Bjorkstrand continued his offensive streak and led the team with 21 goals and tied for third with 36 points before being injured on 20 February during a game against the Philadelphia Flyers. As a result of the injury, Bjorkstrand remained out of the lineup until the Blue Jackets qualified for the 2020 Stanley Cup playoffs. Bjorkstrand and the Blue Jackets met with the Toronto Maple Leafs in the Eastern Conference Qualifying Round of the playoffs and beat them in five games. During the first round against the Tampa Bay Lightning, Bjorkstrand tallied his first goal of the postseason in an eventual 3–2 loss in a five overtime game. The game was the longest game in franchise history and the fourth-longest in league history. He shortly thereafter became the second active player to have each of his first three career playoff game-winning goals come against one opponent. He also set a franchise record for most postseason game-winning goals. The Blue Jackets were eventually eliminated from the playoffs in five games.

Upon being eliminated from the playoffs, Bjorkstrand signed a five-year, $27 million contract extension on 6 January 2021 to remain with the Blue Jackets. He scored his first goal of the season on 18 January 2021 against the Detroit Red Wings and added an assist and a fight for a Gordie Howe hat trick. As the Blue Jackets pushed for a playoff position in March, Bjorkstrand recorded five goals and six assists for 11 points through 10 games. He also led the team with 11 goals and 16 assists for 27 points. In spite of this, Bjorkstrand and the Blue Jackets failed to qualify for the 2021 Stanley Cup playoffs.

Prior to the start of the 2021–22 season, Bjorkstrand was named an alternate captain for the team alongside Werenski and Gustav Nyquist. On 25 October, Bjorkstrand recorded his 100th assist to tie Jakub Voráček for 18th in franchise history at the century mark. His scoring prowess continued and by 7 November he ranked third in franchise history for most points through 10 games. He had accumulated five goals and eight assists to help the team tie their franchise record for the best start in history. Later in December, Bjorkstrand joined Zach Werenski as the second Blue Jacket player to reach 200 points in the 2021–22 season. However, shortly after reaching this milestone he was entered into the NHL's COVID protocol.

==== Seattle Kraken ====
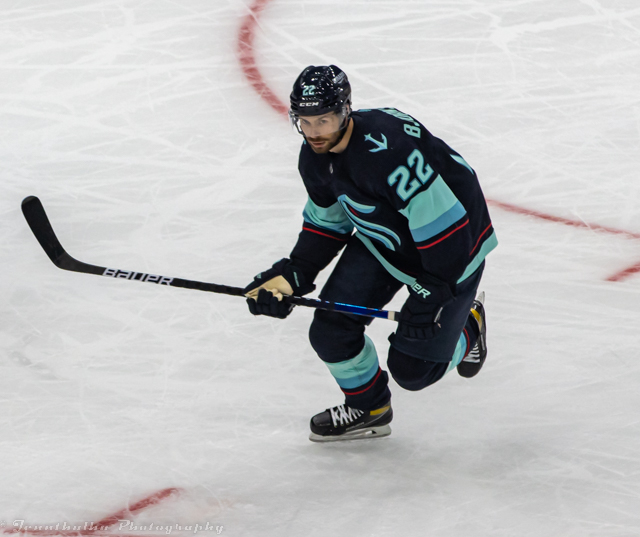
Bjorkstrand during a 2022 preseason game against the Edmonton Oilers.

On 22 July 2022, Bjorkstrand was traded to the Seattle Kraken in exchange for third-round and fourth-round picks in the 2023 NHL entry draft. In spite of his career season, Columbus' general manager Jarmo Kekäläinen explained that the trade was necessary in order to sign Johnny Gaudreau and Patrik Laine. During the Kraken's preseason, Bjorkstrand earned some time on the teams' first powerplay unit and played alongside Matty Beniers and Ryan Donato. However, as he struggled to score goals once the 2022–23 season began, Bjorkstrand was moved to the third line with Brandon Tanev and Yanni Gourde on November 13. He eventually snapped his 17-game scoreless drought during a win over the San Jose Sharks on 23 November. By 11 December, Bjorkstrand had accumulated three goals and 11 assists for 14 points through 27 games. Later that month, Bjorkstrand and Daniel Sprong combined for the fastest two goals in Kraken history en route to a 6–5 shootout loss to the Vancouver Canucks. Their goals came within 10 seconds of each other early in the third period. In early January 2023, Bjorkstrand and Gourde gained Eeli Tolvanen as their new linemate following his acquisition through waivers from the Nashville Predators.

The Kraken qualified for the 2023 Stanley Cup playoffs, the first postseason appearance in franchise history, drawing the Colorado Avalanche, defending champions and the reigning Central Division winners, in the first round. The Kraken were considered significant underdogs going into the contest. However, the series proved unexpectedly competitive, with the Kraken taking the lead by Game 5. Bjorkstrand distinguished himself during the course of the series, scoring both Kraken goals in the team's clinching 2–1 victory in Game 7 to oust the Avalanche.

On 4 January 2024, Bjorkstrand was selected as the main representative for the Kraken at the 2024 NHL All-Star Game for his All-Star debut. Unselected in the player draft, he was assigned to Team MacKinnon, and scored in the team's overtime loss to Team McDavid.

==== Tampa Bay Lightning ====
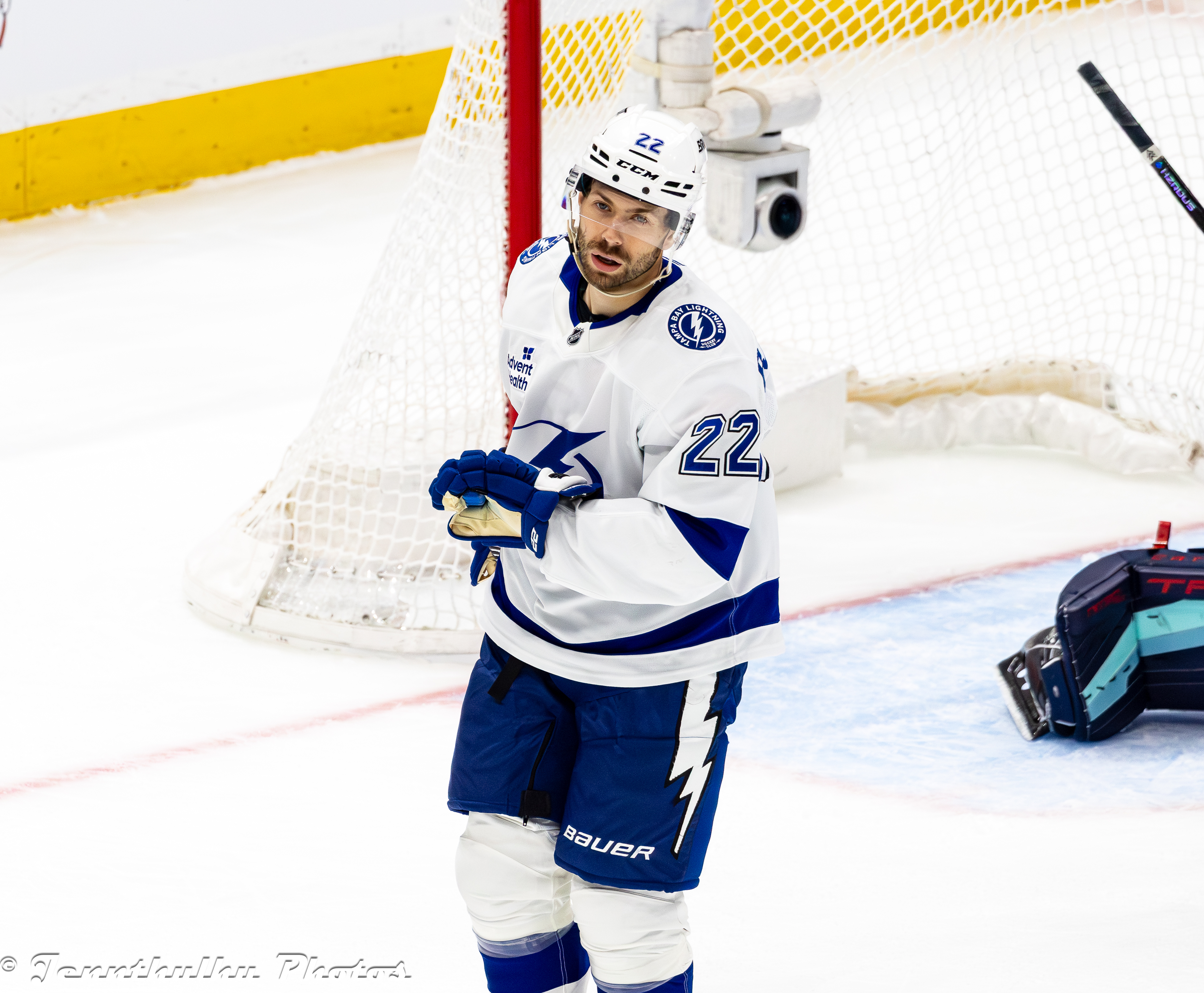
Bjorkstrand with the Tampa Bay Lightning in 2026

On 5 March 2025, Bjorkstrand was traded to the Tampa Bay Lightning alongside Kyle Aucoin, Yanni Gourde, and a fifth-round draft pick as part of a three-team deal, which saw the Kraken receive Mikey Eyssimont, two conditional first-round draft picks, and a second-round pick, while the Detroit Red Wings received a fourth-round pick for retaining half of Gourde's salary. Bjorkstrand debuted for the Lightning two days later, scoring a game-winning goal in the third period.

==== New York Rangers ====
At the conclusion of his contract with the Lightning, Bjorkstrand left as a free agent and was signed to a one-year, $4.5 million contract with the New York Rangers for the 2026–27 season on 1 July 2026.

== International play ==
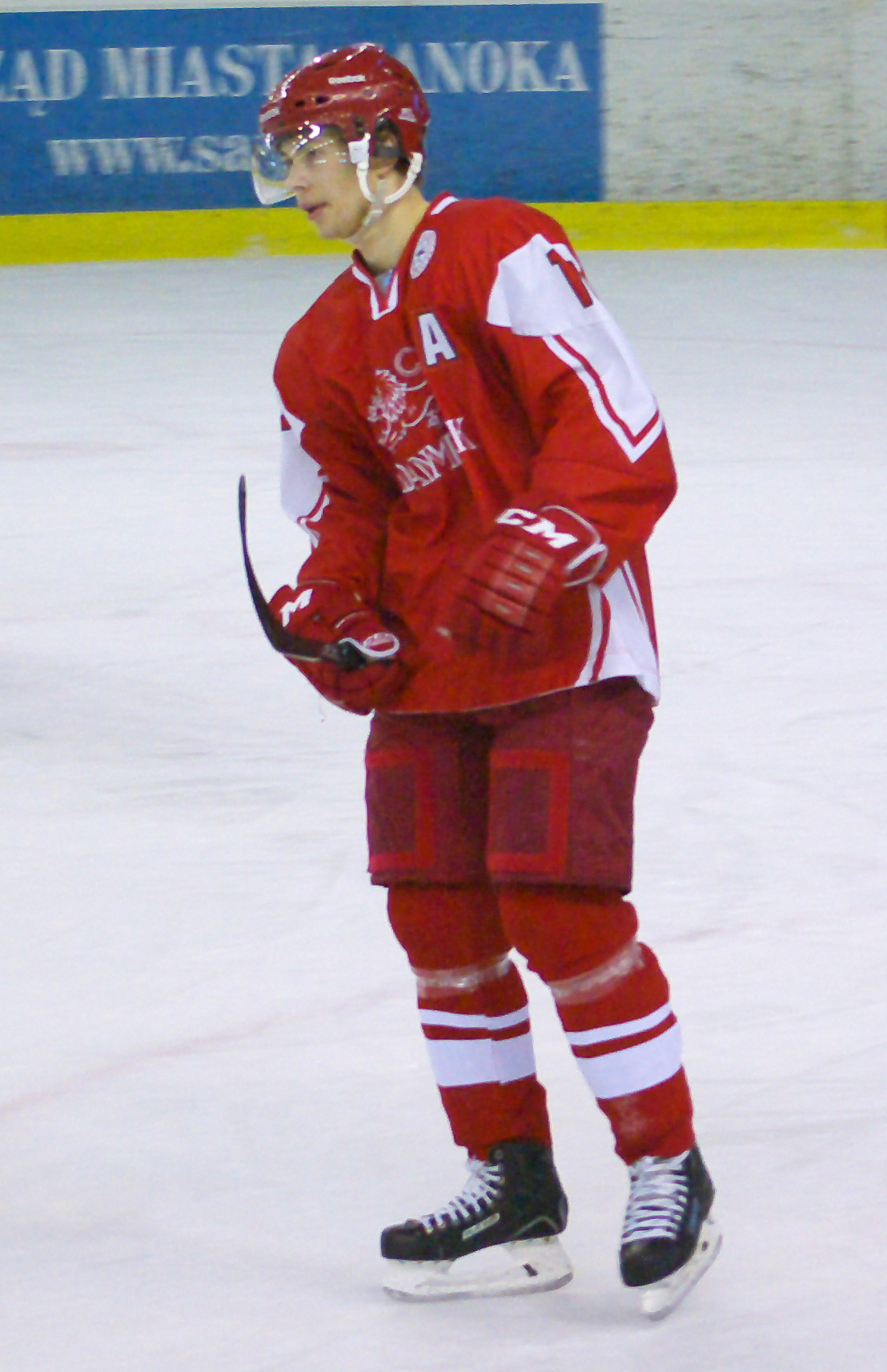
Bjorkstrand representing Denmark in 2013

As a dual citizen of Denmark and the United States, Bjorkstrand has chosen to represent Denmark at international tournaments. He represented Denmark for the first time internationally at the 2012 World Junior Ice Hockey Championships with his father serving as his head coach. Bjorkstrand represented Denmark for the second time at the IIHF World Junior Championship in 2015 after helping them qualify in 2014. During the IIHF World Junior Championship, Division I, Group A tournament, he was named the tournament's Top Forward by the IIHF Directorate. In the same year, Bjorkstrand also made his first senior appearance with the Denmark men's national ice hockey team at the 2015 IIHF World Championship at the age of 20 alongside his brother Patrick.

Bjorkstrand represented Denmark for the second time at the senior level at the 2018 IIHF World Championship. During the tournament, Denmark beat Germany, Finland, Norway, and South Korea but lost to Latvia and missed out on the quarter-finals.

On 8 October 2021, Bjorkstrand was one of three players named to Team Denmark's first-ever Olympic hockey team for the 2022 Winter Olympics. When speaking of the opportunity, Bjorkstrand said: "It’s going to be tough task for us to go far, but it’s a huge honour for us to be there. We’re obviously going to do our best. And it’s always in the back of our heads that we can surprise a bit. We’re all super pumped."

== Career statistics ==
=== Regular season and playoffs ===
			Regular season					Playoffs
Season	Team	League	GP	G	A	Pts	PIM	GP	G	A	Pts	PIM
2010–11	Herning	DEN U17	19	28	26	54	39	—	—	—	—	—
2010–11	Herning	DEN U20	11	13	6	19	2	6	1	7	8	0
2010–11	Herning II	DEN-2	—	—	—	—	—	1	0	0	0	0
2011–12	Herning Blue Fox	DEN	36	13	13	26	10	10	1	2	3	4
2011–12	Herning IK	DEN-2	5	1	2	3	0	—	—	—	—	—
2012–13	Portland Winterhawks	WHL	65	31	32	63	10	21	8	11	19	4
2013–14	Portland Winterhawks	WHL	69	50	59	109	36	21	16	17	33	8
2014–15	Portland Winterhawks	WHL	59	63	55	118	35	17	13	12	25	10
2015–16	Columbus Blue Jackets	NHL	12	4	4	8	0	—	—	—	—	—
2015–16	Lake Erie Monsters	AHL	51	17	12	29	10	17	10	6	16	2
2016–17	Columbus Blue Jackets	NHL	26	6	7	13	6	5	0	1	1	0
2016–17	Cleveland Monsters	AHL	37	14	12	26	6	—	—	—	—	—
2017–18	Columbus Blue Jackets	NHL	82	11	29	40	9	6	1	2	3	0
2018–19	Columbus Blue Jackets	NHL	77	23	13	36	8	10	2	3	5	0
2019–20	Columbus Blue Jackets	NHL	49	21	15	36	12	10	3	0	3	0
2020–21	Columbus Blue Jackets	NHL	56	18	26	44	23	—	—	—	—	—
2021–22	Columbus Blue Jackets	NHL	80	28	29	57	16	—	—	—	—	—
2022–23	Seattle Kraken	NHL	81	20	25	45	16	14	4	4	8	0
2023–24	Seattle Kraken	NHL	82	20	39	59	12	—	—	—	—	—
2024–25	Seattle Kraken	NHL	61	16	21	37	14	—	—	—	—	—
2024–25	Tampa Bay Lightning	NHL	18	5	4	9	4	—	—	—	—	—
2025–26	Tampa Bay Lightning	NHL	80	12	20	32	16	4	0	0	0	0
NHL totals			704	184	232	416	136	48	10	10	20	0
Metal Ligaen totals			36	13	13	26	10	10	1	2	3	4

=== International ===
Year	Team	Event	GP	G	A	Pts	PIM
2012	Denmark	WJC	6	2	0	2	0
2012	Denmark	WJC18	6	4	3	7	0
2013	Denmark	WJC D1A	5	5	3	8	2
2014	Denmark	WJC D1A	5	4	2	6	2
2015	Denmark	WJC	5	4	1	5	2
2015	Denmark	WC	3	0	0	0	2
2016	Denmark	OGQ	3	0	1	1	0
2018	Denmark	WC	7	1	2	3	0
2021	Denmark	OGQ	3	3	2	5	2
2026	Denmark	OG	4	0	1	1	0
Junior totals			27	19	9	28	6
Senior totals			20	4	6	10	4

== Awards and honours ==
Awards	Year	Ref
WHL
First All-Star Team (West)	2013–14, 2014–15	
Bob Clarke Trophy	2014–15	
WHL Plus-Minus Award	2014–15	
AHL
Calder Cup champion	2016	
Jack A. Butterfield Trophy	2016	
NHL
NHL All-Star Game	2024	
