= IK Århus =

- City: Århus, Denmark
- League: Danish Division 1
- Founded: 2008
- Home arena: Aarhus Skøjtehal

IK Århus is an ice hockey team in Århus, Denmark. They play in the Danish Division 1, the second level of ice hockey in the country. They play their home games at Aarhus Skøjtehal.

== History ==
The team was founded in 2008. Århus took part in the Danish Cup during the 2009–10 and 2010–11 seasons. They finished in fourth place in the first round in 2009-10 and lost to the Odense Bulldogs 5–1 in the final qualifier after finishing first in the qualification round in 2010–11.
