= 1993–94 Eliteserien (Denmark) season =

Danish ice hockey league season

The 1993–94 Eliteserien season was the 37th season of ice hockey in Denmark. Ten teams participated in the league, and Herning IK won the championship.

== First round ==
| | Club | GP | W | T | L | GF | GA | Pts |
|---|---|---|---|---|---|---|---|---|
| 1. | Esbjerg IK | 18 | 14 | 3 | 1 | 123 | 61 | 31 |
| 2. | Herning IK | 18 | 13 | 2 | 3 | 114 | 61 | 28 |
| 3. | AaB Ishockey | 18 | 9 | 4 | 5 | 94 | 69 | 22 |
| 4. | Rungsted IK | 18 | 9 | 3 | 6 | 91 | 76 | 21 |
| 5. | Frederikshavn White Hawks | 18 | 9 | 1 | 8 | 95 | 99 | 19 |
| 6. | Odense Bulldogs | 18 | 7 | 2 | 9 | 79 | 93 | 16 |
| 7. | Hvidovre Ishockey | 18 | 6 | 2 | 10 | 73 | 88 | 14 |
| 8. | Rødovre Mighty Bulls | 18 | 5 | 4 | 9 | 69 | 89 | 14 |
| 9. | Hellerup IK | 18 | 3 | 2 | 13 | 67 | 111 | 8 |
| 10. | Vojens IK | 18 | 3 | 1 | 14 | 55 | 114 | 7 |

== Final round ==
| | Club | GP | W | T | L | GF | GA | Pts |
|---|---|---|---|---|---|---|---|---|
| 1. | Herning IK | 10 | 8 | 0 | 2 | 64 | 26 | 30 |
| 2. | Esbjerg IK | 10 | 7 | 0 | 3 | 57 | 32 | 30 |
| 3. | AaB Ishockey | 10 | 4 | 1 | 5 | 42 | 49 | 20 |
| 4. | Frederikshavn White Hawks | 10 | 4 | 0 | 6 | 39 | 72 | 18 |
| 5. | Rungsted IK | 10 | 2 | 1 | 7 | 35 | 51 | 16 |
| 6. | Odense Bulldogs | 10 | 4 | 0 | 6 | 51 | 53 | 16 |

== Playoffs ==
Semi-finals
Herning IK | 3
Frederikshavn White Hawks | 0
Esbjerg IK | 3
Aalborg IK | 0

Final
Herning IK | 3
Esbjerg IK | 1
Third place
not played
