= 1994–95 Eliteserien (Denmark) season =

Danish ice hockey league season

The 1994–95 Eliteserien season was the 38th season of ice hockey in Denmark. Ten teams participated in the league, and Herning IK won the championship.

== First round ==
	Club	GP	W	T	L	GF	GA	Pts
1.	Herning IK	36	31	3	2	281	104	49
2.	Esbjerg IK	36	26	4	6	218	104	42
3.	Rungsted IK	36	21	5	10	207	139	34
4.	AaB Ishockey	36	15	9	11	159	138	32
5.	Frederikshavn White Hawks	36	14	5	17	143	171	25
6.	Vojens IK	36	15	1	19	183	198	23
7.	Odense Bulldogs	36	13	4	17	157	169	23
8.	Hellerup IK	36	11	8	17	110	134	22
9.	Rødovre Mighty Bulls	36	7	7	22	109	225	17
10.	Hvidovre Ishockey	36	1	4	31	79	254	5

== Final round ==
=== Group A ===
	Club	GP	W	T	L	GF	GA	Pts
1.	Herning IK	4	4	0	0	33	9	8
2.	Vojens IK	4	1	1	2	12	26	3
3.	AaB Ishockey	4	0	1	3	12	22	1

=== Group B ===
	Club	GP	W	T	L	GF	GA	Pts
1.	Esbjerg IK	4	4	0	0	31	10	8
2.	Rungsted IK	4	1	0	3	15	22	2
3.	Frederikshavn White Hawks	4	1	0	3	11	25	2

== Playoffs ==
=== 3rd place ===
- Rungsted IK - Vojens IK 2:0 (12:3, 7:5)

=== Final ===
- Herning IK - Esbjerg IK 3:0 (7:1, 6:1, 9:2)
