= 1995–96 Eliteserien (Denmark) season =

39th season of ice hockey in Denmark

The 1995–96 Eliteserien season was the 39th season of ice hockey in Denmark. Ten teams participated in the league, and Esbjerg IK won the championship.

== First round ==
	Club	GP	W	T	L	GF	GA	Pts
1.	Esbjerg IK	36	26	5	5	205	103	44
2.	Herning IK	36	26	3	7	200	115	43
3.	Rungsted IK	36	17	7	12	171	145	32
4.	Hvidovre Ishockey	36	19	4	13	178	165	31
5.	Vojens IK	36	17	3	16	178	170	28
6.	Odense Bulldogs	36	12	9	15	146	165	25
7.	Rødovre Mighty Bulls	36	11	7	18	118	145	22
8.	Frederikshavn White Hawks	36	10	7	19	133	173	20
9.	Hellerup IK	36	9	5	22	119	184	16
10.	AaB Ishockey	36	5	4	27	111	197	11

== Final round ==
=== Group A ===
	Club	GP	W	T	L	GF	GA	Pts
1.	Esbjerg IK	4	3	0	1	19	7	6
2.	Hvidovre Ishockey	4	2	0	2	12	18	4
3.	Odense Bulldogs	4	1	0	3	10	16	2

=== Group B ===
	Club	GP	W	T	L	GF	GA	Pts
1.	Rungsted IK	4	3	0	1	21	13	6
2.	Herning IK	4	3	0	1	25	16	6
3.	Vojens IK	4	0	0	4	13	30	0

== Playoffs ==
=== 3rd place ===
- Herning IK - Hvidovre Ishockey 2:0 (12:0, 9:2)

=== Final ===
- Esbjerg IK - Rungsted IK 3:1 (6:0, 4:6, 6:5, 5:2)
