= Herning Blue Fox =

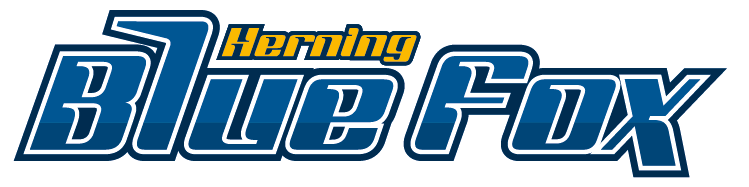
- City: Herning
- League: Metal Ligaen
- Founded: 1947
- Home arena: KVIK Hockey Arena (Capacity: 4,105)
- Colors
- Head coach: Garth Murray
- Captain: Morten Poulsen
- Website: www.bluefox.dk

Championships
- Danish Champions: 17 (1973, 1977, 1987, 1991, 1992, 1994, 1995, 1997, 1998, 2001, 2003, 2005, 2007, 2008, 2011, 2012, 2026)

Herning Blue Fox is a Danish professional ice hockey team based in Herning, Denmark, playing in the Metal Ligaen, the top tier of Danish ice hockey. The club was founded in 1947 and play their home games in the KVIK Hockey Arena which has a capacity of 4,105 spectators.

The club has won the Danish championship 17 times with the last title coming in 2026.

== Club history ==
=== 2015–2016: Mario Simioni era ===

2015–2016 season

After the departure of long-time head coach Todd Bjorkstrand, Herning signed Mario Simioni to take the helm of the club. Simioni led the team to the playoffs where they faced the fifth-ranked Odense Bulldogs in the quarterfinals. Herning started the series strong with a 2–1 victory at home, though Odense then evened it up in game two, with a 3–0 shutout victory. Herning came back strong in game three as they dominated Odense in a 6–1 road win. Game four was a 2–1 victory to Odense, again evening up the series. Odense took their first lead of the series as they won game five in overtime 2–1. Herning evened up the series in game six with a 2–1 victory on the road. Herning won the series, with a series-clinching 2–1 overtime win in game seven to move on to the semis.

The semifinals saw the Herning Blue Fox facing the second-ranked Frederikshavn White Hawks. Game one resulted in a 3–1 home win for the White Hawks. In game two Herning came out victorious in a blowout 7–1 win. The White Hawks regained the series lead with a 5–2 win in game three. In game four Herning evened up the series with a 5–2 win. The White Hawks won game five 5–3 as they took back the series lead, though game six saw Herning shutout the White Hawks in a 2–0 win. Herning defeated the White Hawks 3–1 in game seven to clinch a spot in the league final.

In the finals, Herning Blue Fox was set to clash with the Esbjerg Energy. In game one, Esbjerg came out victorious in a 3–2 home win. Though Herning won three straight games to take a 3–1 series lead, Esbjerg won three straight games to win the finals—their first since 2004.

After his first season with Herning, Simioni left the club to join the coaching staff of the Hamburg Freezers of the Deutsche Eishockey Liga (DEL) in Germany as an assistant to Serge Aubin.

=== 2016–present: Return of Todd Bjorkstrand ===
2016–2017 season

In May 2016, Herning Blue Fox signed former head coach Todd Bjorkstrand. Bjorkstrand returned to the club after leaving in 2014 to coach the Graz 99ers of the Erste Bank Hockey League.

== Season by season record ==
This is a partial list of the last five seasons completed by Herning Blue Fox.

Seasons of Herning Blue Fox
| Season | Rank | GP | W | L | OTW | OTL | Pts | Postseason |
|---|---|---|---|---|---|---|---|---|
| 2011–12 | 3rd | 40 | 23 | 14 | 2 | 1 | 74 | Champion |
| 2012–13 | 1st | 40 | 24 | 8 | 4 | 4 | 84 | Quarter final loss |
| 2013–14 | 2nd | 40 | 25 | 7 | 4 | 4 | 87 | Final loss |
| 2014–15 | 1st | 36 | 24 | 6 | 0 | 6 | 78 | Bronze medal game loss |
| 2015–16 | 4th | 45 | 21 | 15 | 4 | 5 | 76 | Final loss |

== Players ==
=== Current roster ===
Updated 1 October 2024.

| No. | Nat | Player | Pos | S/G | Age | Acquired | Birthplace |
|---|---|---|---|---|---|---|---|
| 44 | (Finland) | Aleksi Ainali | C | L | 31 | 2024 | Vihti, Finland |
| 87 | (Denmark) | Marcus Almquist | C | R | 23 | 2024 | Rødovre, Denmark |
| 29 | (Denmark) | Lukas Bang | LW | L | 24 | 2020 | Herning, Denmark |
| 8 | (Denmark) | Jesper Bank Olesen | D | L | 20 | 2024 | Herning, Denmark |
| 50 | (Denmark) | Mathias Bau Hansen | W | L | 33 | 2020 | Glostrup, Denmark |
| 89 | (Denmark) | Magnus Carlsen | LW | L | 25 | 2023 | Rødovre, Denmark |
| 27 | (Latvia) | Oskars Cibuļskis | D | L | 38 | 2023 | Riga, Latvian SSR, Soviet Union |
| 13 | (Denmark) | Victor Čubars | W | L | 26 | 2023 | Hvidovre, Denmark |
| 19 | (Denmark) | Martin Eskildsen | LW | L | 30 | 2023 | Vejle, Denmark |
| 30 | (Latvia) | Jānis Fecers | G | L | 20 | 2023 | Riga, Latvia |
| 14 | (Sweden) | Petter Hansson (A) | D | L | 30 | 2020 | Gislaved, Sweden |
| 5 | (Denmark) | Jacob Jessen | D | L | 28 | 2018 | Herning, Denmark |
| 28 | (Denmark) | Emil Kristensen (A) | D | R | 34 | 2024 | Esbjerg, Denmark |
| 38 | (Denmark) | Hjalte Kruse Thomsen | LW | L | 21 | 2024 | Herning, Denmark |
| 88 | (Canada) | Simon Lafrance | C | L | 28 | 2024 | Saint-Eustache, Quebec, Canada |
| 73 | (Denmark) | Joachim Linnet | LW | L | 33 | 2021 | Herning, Denmark |
| 81 | (Denmark) | Christian Mieritz | D | L | 29 | 2022 | Rødovre, Denmark |
| 15 | (Sweden) | Jacob Nordqvist | D | R | 28 | 2024 | Gothenburg, Sweden |
| 11 | (Canada) | Derian Plouffe | C | L | 31 | 2024 | Shawville, Quebec, Canada |
| 71 | (Denmark) | Maksim Popovic | F | L | 24 | 2024 | Herlev, Denmark |
| 38 | (Denmark) | Morten Poulsen (C) | LW | L | 38 | 2018 | Herning, Denmark |
| 43 | (Denmark) | Mathias Seldrup | G | L | 30 | 2024 | Herning, Denmark |
| 9 | (Canada) | Brett Thompson | C | R | 35 | 2023 | Sault Ste. Marie, Ontario, Canada |

=== Retired numbers ===
Herning Blue Fox retired numbers
| No. | Player | Position | Career |
|---|---|---|---|
| 3 | Svend Laugesen | D | 1975–1993 |
| 22 | Todd Bjorkstrand | C | 1988–2002 |

=== NHL alumni ===
- Frederik Andersen
- Oliver Bjorkstrand
- Nicklas Jensen
- Frans Nielsen
- Peter Regin
