= 1996–97 Eliteserien (Denmark) season =

Danish ice hockey league season

The 1996–97 Eliteserien season was the 40th season of ice hockey in Denmark. Ten teams participated in the league, and Herning IK won the championship.

== First round ==
	Club	GP	W	T	L	GF	GA	Pts
1.	Herning IK	27	18	3	6	144	74	39
2.	Esbjerg IK	27	17	1	9	134	103	35
3.	Rungsted IK	27	16	2	9	135	98	34
4.	Vojens IK	27	16	2	9	131	107	34
5.	Rødovre Mighty Bulls	27	11	7	9	100	99	29
6.	Hvidovre Ishockey	27	13	2	12	94	96	28
7.	IC Gentofte	27	11	2	14	121	137	24
8.	AaB Ishockey	27	10	1	16	82	128	21
9.	Frederikshavn White Hawks	27	8	2	17	92	121	18
10.	Odense Bulldogs	27	4	0	23	75	145	8

== Final round ==
	Club	GP	W	T	L	GF	GA	Pts
1.	Herning IK	15	12	1	2	94	36	25
2.	Vojens IK	15	8	3	4	67	72	19
3.	Esbjerg IK	15	8	2	5	82	57	18
4.	Rungsted IK	15	6	1	8	86	70	13
5.	Rødovre Mighty Bulls	15	4	0	11	60	91	8
6.	Hvidovre Ishockey	15	3	1	11	46	91	7

== Relegation round ==
	Club	GP	W	T	L	GF	GA	Pts (Bonus)
1.	IC Gentofte	14	12	0	2	97	37	27(3)
2.	Frederikshavn White Hawks	14	11	1	2	90	34	24(1)
3.	Odense Bulldogs	14	11	1	2	85	42	23(0)
4.	AaB Ishockey	14	10	0	4	84	41	22(2)
5.	KSF Copenhagen	14	4	1	9	41	71	12(3)
6.	IK Århus	14	3	2	9	55	117	8(0)
7.	Gladsaxe SF	14	2	0	12	37	83	6(2)
8.	Herlev Hornets	14	1	1	12	36	99	4(1)

== Playoffs ==
Quarter-finals
Herning IK	3
Frederikshavn White Hawks	0
Vojens IK	1
IC Gentofte	3
Esbjerg IK	3
Hvidovre Ishockey	0
Rungsted IK	3
Rødovre Mighty Bulls	1

Semi-finals
Herning IK	3
IC Gentofte	0
Esbjerg IK	3
Rungsted IK	1

Final
Herning IK	4
Esbjerg IK	0
Third place
Rungsted IK	2
IC Gentofte	0
