= 1997–98 Eliteserien (Denmark) season =

Danish ice hockey league season

The 1997–98 Eliteserien season was the 41st season of ice hockey in Denmark. Ten teams participated in the league, and Herning IK won the championship.

== First round ==
| | Club | GP | W | T | L | GF | GA | Pts |
|---|---|---|---|---|---|---|---|---|
| 1. | Rungsted IK | 27 | 18 | 5 | 4 | 149 | 88 | 41 |
| 2. | Frederikshavn White Hawks | 27 | 15 | 3 | 9 | 109 | 93 | 33 |
| 3. | Herning IK | 27 | 15 | 3 | 9 | 137 | 88 | 33 |
| 4. | Rødovre Mighty Bulls | 27 | 14 | 1 | 12 | 103 | 103 | 29 |
| 5. | Esbjerg IK | 27 | 11 | 6 | 10 | 109 | 97 | 28 |
| 6. | Vojens IK | 27 | 11 | 5 | 11 | 99 | 88 | 27 |
| 7. | Hvidovre Ishockey | 27 | 11 | 4 | 12 | 103 | 103 | 26 |
| 8. | IC Gentofte | 27 | 11 | 4 | 12 | 112 | 119 | 26 |
| 9. | Odense Bulldogs | 27 | 9 | 5 | 13 | 98 | 126 | 23 |
| 10. | AaB Ishockey | 27 | 1 | 2 | 24 | 36 | 150 | 4 |

== Final round ==
| | Club | GP | W | T | L | GF | GA | Pts |
|---|---|---|---|---|---|---|---|---|
| 1. | Herning IK | 10 | 6 | 3 | 1 | 51 | 27 | 15 |
| 2. | Esbjerg IK | 10 | 7 | 1 | 2 | 45 | 35 | 15 |
| 3. | Rungsted IK | 10 | 5 | 1 | 4 | 38 | 40 | 11 |
| 4. | Frederikshavn White Hawks | 10 | 4 | 0 | 6 | 41 | 43 | 8 |
| 5. | Vojens IK | 10 | 3 | 1 | 6 | 38 | 45 | 7 |
| 6. | Rødovre Mighty Bulls | 10 | 2 | 0 | 8 | 25 | 48 | 4 |

== Playoffs ==
Quarter-finals
Herning IK | 3
Hvidovre Ishockey | 0
Frederikshavn White Hawks | 3
Vojens IK | 0
Esbjerg IK | 3
IC Gentofte | 1
Rungsted IK | 3
Rødovre Mighty Bulls | 1

Semi-finals
Herning IK | 3
Frederikshavn White Hawks | 2
Esbjerg IK | 1
Rungsted IK | 3

Final
Herning IK | 3
Rungsted IK | 2
Third place
Esbjerg IK | 0
Frederikshavn White Hawks | 2
