= Nico Krämmer =

German ice hockey player (born 1992)

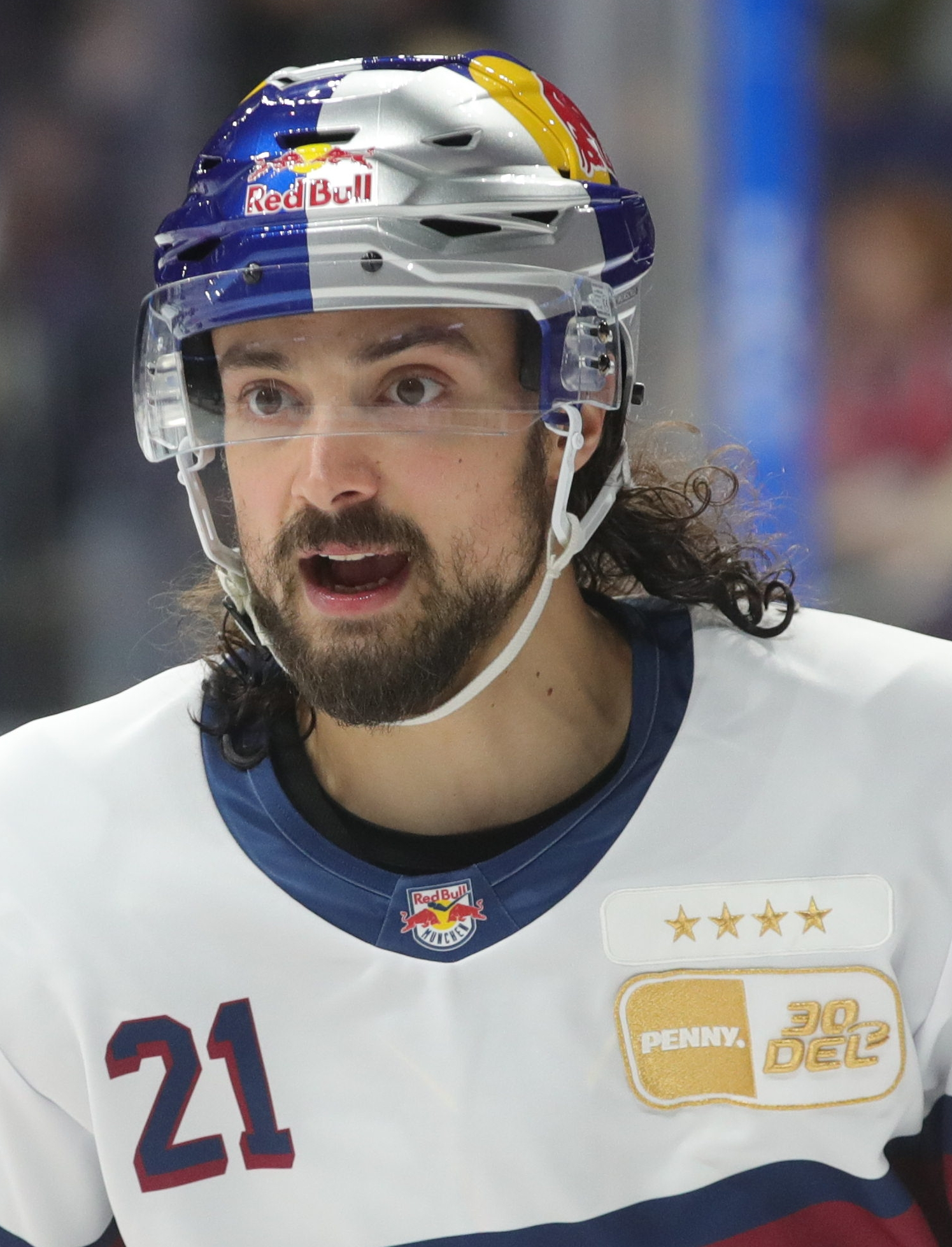
- Krämmer in 2023
- Born: 23 October 1992 (age 33) Landshut, Germany
- Height: 1.86 m (6 ft 1 in)
- Weight: 94 kg (207 lb; 14 st 11 lb)
- Position: Winger
- Shoots: Left
- DEL team Former teams: Fischtown Pinguins; ERC Ingolstadt; Hamburg Freezers; Kölner Haie; Adler Mannheim; EHC München
- National team: Germany
- NHL draft: Undrafted
- Playing career: 2011–present

Nicolas Krämmer (born 23 October 1992) is a German professional ice hockey player who is a winger for the Fischtown Pinguins of the Deutsche Eishockey Liga (DEL).

== Playing career ==
Krammer appeared in two DEL games for ERC Ingolstadt during the 2010–11 season. The next year, he played one season overseas in the North American Junior League with the Acadie–Bathurst Titan of the Quebec Major Junior Hockey League (QMJHL). After that single season with the Titans, Krammer went back to Germany and signed with the DEL team Hamburg Freezers.

After spending four seasons with the Freezers, the team ceased operations following the conclusion of the 2015–16 season. As a result, Krammer became a free agent. On 6 June 2016, he signed a one-year contract with Kölner Haie, marking his third team in the Deutsche Eishockey Liga (DEL).

Krämmer played for two full seasons with Kölner Haie, contributing significantly to the team's efforts during that period. After the conclusion of the 2017–18 season, he decided to move on and signed a two-year contract with Adler Mannheim on 16 April 2018.

After completing five successful seasons with Adler Mannheim, Krämmer decided to continue his career in the DEL. On 4 May 2023, he signed a one-year contract with EHC München.

Following two seasons playing for Red Bull, Krämmer entered free agency. On 7 April 2025, he signed a one-year contract with the Fischtown Pinguins, continuing his career in the Deutsche Eishockey Liga (DEL) with the Bremerhaven-based club.

== International play ==
In 2018, he was selected to represent Germany at the IIHF World Championship.

== Career statistics ==
=== Regular season and playoffs ===
			Regular season					Playoffs
Season	Team	League	GP	G	A	Pts	PIM	GP	G	A	Pts	PIM
2007–08	Landshut Cannibals	DNL	33	0	5	5	42	3	0	0	0	2
2008–09	Landshut Cannibals	DNL	30	13	13	26	34	9	5	6	11	6
2009–10	Landshut Cannibals	DNL	31	18	23	41	77	8	2	10	12	20
2009–10	Landshut Cannibals	2.GBun	11	0	2	2	4	2	0	0	0	0
2010–11	Landshut Cannibals	DNL	7	1	6	7	12	8	6	7	13	31
2010–11	Landshut Cannibals	2.GBun	37	5	6	11	57	6	0	0	0	2
2010–11	ERC Ingolstadt	DEL	2	0	0	0	0	—	—	—	—	—
2011–12	Acadie–Bathurst Titan	QMJHL	24	1	3	4	16	—	—	—	—	—
2011–12	Landshut Cannibals	2.GBun	20	3	3	6	4	10	0	3	3	10
2012–13	Hamburg Freezers	DEL	48	6	10	16	18	6	0	2	2	2
2013–14	Hamburg Freezers	DEL	51	5	13	18	14	12	0	1	1	2
2014–15	Hamburg Freezers	DEL	47	8	8	16	36	5	0	1	1	25
2015–16	Hamburg Freezers	DEL	37	8	8	16	26	—	—	—	—	—
2016–17	Kölner Haie	DEL	52	10	7	17	12	7	0	1	1	2
2017–18	Kölner Haie	DEL	52	9	6	15	6	6	0	0	0	2
2018–19	Adler Mannheim	DEL	40	2	6	8	24	12	0	2	2	8
2019–20	Adler Mannheim	DEL	44	10	9	19	16	—	—	—	—	—
2020–21	Adler Mannheim	DEL	37	8	11	19	22	6	1	0	1	4
2021–22	Adler Mannheim	DEL	45	8	15	23	22	9	3	1	4	2
2022–23	Adler Mannheim	DEL	52	5	11	16	13	12	1	1	2	8
2023–24	EHC München	DEL	46	9	11	20	18	9	3	3	6	2
2024–25	EHC München	DEL	40	6	6	12	12	5	1	0	1	0
DEL totals			593	94	121	215	239	89	9	12	21	57

=== International ===
Year	Team	Event	Result	GP	G	A	Pts	PIM
2010	Germany	WJC18 D1	11th	5	4	3	7	2
2012	Germany	WJC D1	11th	5	2	3	5	2
2015	Germany	WC	10th	5	1	1	2	0
2018	Germany	WC	11th	7	0	0	0	0
2021	Germany	WC	4th	10	0	3	3	4
2022	Germany	OG	10th	3	0	0	0	0
2026	Germany	WC	10th	7	0	2	2	2
Junior totals				10	6	6	12	4
Senior totals				32	1	6	7	6

== Awards and honours ==
Award	Year	Ref
DEL
Champion	2019	
