= John Ramage (ice hockey) =

American ice hockey player (born 1991)

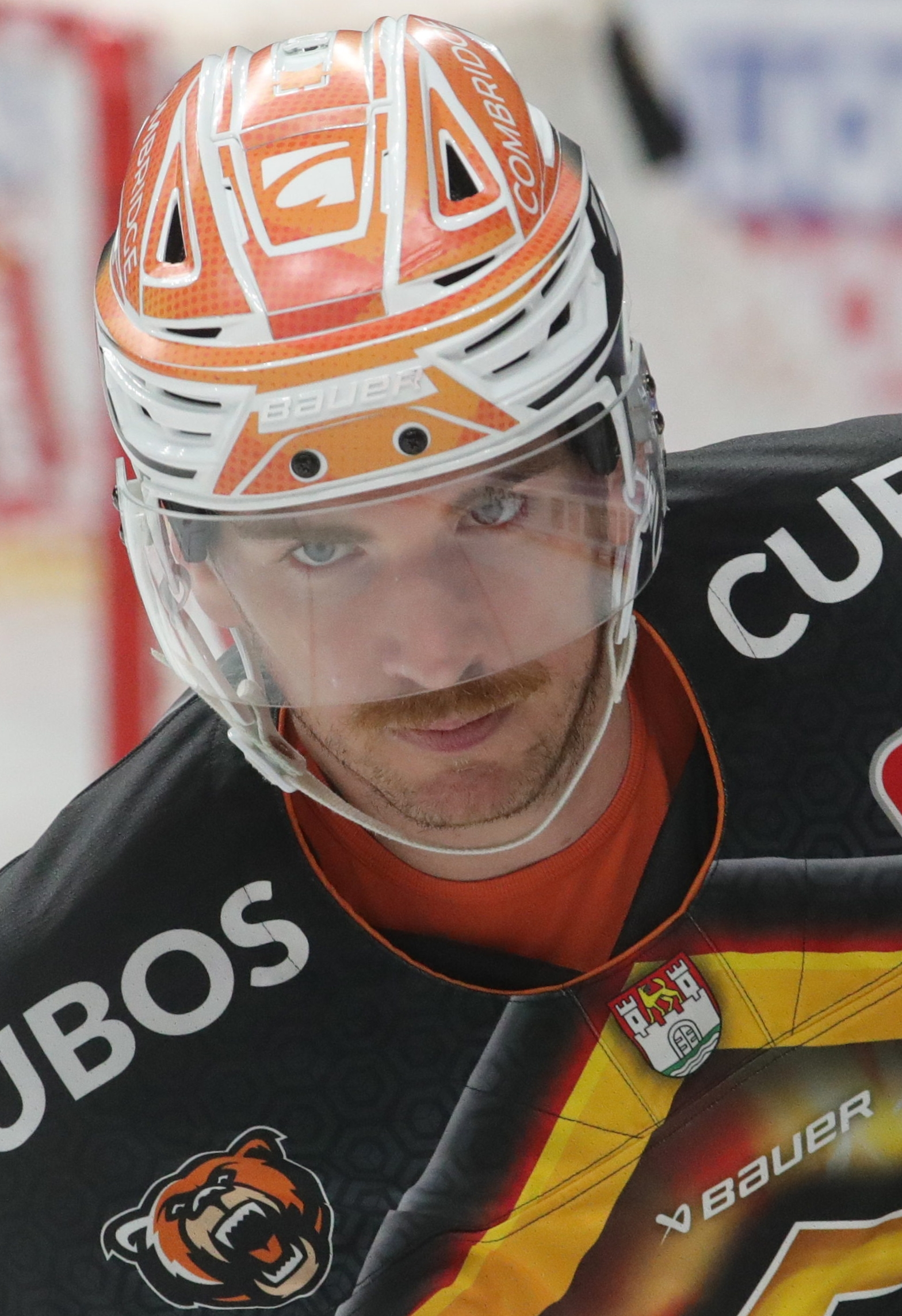
- Ramage with the Grizzlys Wolfsburg in 2023
- Born: February 7, 1991 (age 35) Mississauga, Ontario, Canada^{[a]}
- Height: 6 ft 0 in (183 cm)
- Weight: 200 lb (91 kg; 14 st 4 lb)
- Position: Defence
- Shoots: Right
- DEL team Former teams: Grizzlys Wolfsburg; Calgary Flames; Columbus Blue Jackets; Eisbären Berlin; Schwenninger Wild Wings
- NHL draft: 103rd overall, 2010; Calgary Flames
- Playing career: 2013–present

John Ramage (born February 7, 1991) is a Canadian born-American professional ice hockey defenceman currently playing for Grizzlys Wolfsburg of the Deutsche Eishockey Liga (DEL). Ramage was a fourth-round selection of the Calgary Flames (103rd overall) at the 2010 NHL entry draft.

Ramage played four seasons of college hockey with the University of Wisconsin Badgers and has twice won a medal as a member of the American junior national team: Gold at the 2010 World Junior Ice Hockey Championships, and bronze as captain of the American junior national team that won the bronze medal at the 2011 World Junior Ice Hockey Championships. He turned professional in 2013 and made his NHL debut in 2015.

== Early life ==
Ramage was born in the Toronto suburb of Mississauga, Ontario, when his father, former National Hockey League (NHL) player Rob Ramage, was a member of the Toronto Maple Leafs, but was raised in the St. Louis area suburb of Chesterfield, Missouri.^{[a]} He is the son of Rob and his wife Dawn, and has two elder sisters, Tamara and Jacklyn.

As a youth, Ramage played in the 2004 Quebec International Pee-Wee Hockey Tournament with the St. Louis Blues minor ice hockey team. Ramage followed his father into hockey and played for his hometown St. Louis Bandits in the North American Hockey League (NAHL) in 2007–08 before joining the USA Hockey National Team Development Program (USNTDP) for a year. While a member of the program, Ramage represented Team USA at the 2009 IIHF World U18 Championships and recorded one assist in seven games for the gold medal-winning squad.

At least four National Collegiate Athletic Association (NCAA) schools attempted to recruit Ramage, as did the Sault Ste. Marie Greyhounds of the Ontario Hockey League (OHL). Ramage accepted a scholarship offer to attend the University of Wisconsin and play with the Wisconsin Badgers hockey team beginning in the 2009–10 season. At Wisconsin, Ramage majored in life sciences communication and completed his four-year degree.

== Playing career ==
=== College ===
Ramage played four seasons with the Badgers between 2009 and 2013. As a freshman in 2009–10, he scored 2 goals and added 10 assists in 41 games. He also joined the United States junior national team for the 2010 World Junior Ice Hockey Championships. Ramage recorded three assists in seven games and the Americans defeated the host Canadians in the final to win the gold medal. Ramage played in his second World Junior Championship in 2011; he served as team captain for the bronze medal-winning Americans.

At the 2011 NHL entry draft, Ramage was selected in the fourth round, 103rd overall, by the Calgary Flames – one of his father's former teams. He remained at Wisconsin, and in his sophomore season of 2010–11, scored 1 goal and added 10 assists. Named the Badger's captain in his junior season of 2011–12, Ramage initially struggled and finished with only 10 points in 37 games. Wanting to complete his degree and to continue to develop as a player, Ramage declined an opportunity to turn professional with the Flames and instead returned to Wisconsin for his senior season. Ramage enjoyed his best collegiate season in 2012–13 as he tallied 8 goals and 12 assists for 20 points in 42 games. In 157 games over four years, he scored 14 goals and 53 points.

=== Professional ===
Upon completing his college career, Ramage signed a two-year contract with the Calgary Flames. He began the 2013–14 season with Calgary's American Hockey League (AHL) affiliate, the Abbotsford Heat, where he recorded only 1 assist in 50 games. The Flames demoted him to the ECHL's Alaska Aces, a development that Ramage later said benefited him as he received increased responsibilities with Alaska. He appeared in the team's final six regular season games, during which he recorded one goal. He then added 4 more goals and 13 assists in 20 playoff games as the Aces won the Kelly Cup championship.

Returning to the AHL for the 2014–15 season, Ramage was assigned to Calgary's relocated affiliate, the Adirondack Flames. He recorded 14 points with the team in 53 games before earning his first NHL recall on April 10, 2015. He made his NHL debut the following day in a 5–1 loss to the Winnipeg Jets. Following the season, the Flames chose not to extend a qualifying offer to Ramage on a new contract, thus making him an unrestricted free agent. On July 3, 2015, Ramage signed a one-year, two-way contract with the Columbus Blue Jackets. He contributed to the Lake Erie Monsters Calder Cup championship for the 2015–16 season.

During his third season within the Blue Jackets organization in the 2017–18 campaign, Ramage was traded to the Arizona Coyotes in exchange for future considerations on January 22, 2018. On February 26, 2018, the Coyotes traded Ramage along with Tyler Gaudet to the Nashville Predators in exchange for Pierre-Cédric Labrie and Trevor Murphy. He was immediately assigned to the Predators AHL affiliate, the Milwaukee Admirals, adding 3 assists in 21 games.

On July 1, 2018, Ramage continued his journeyman career, agreeing to a one-year, two-way contract with the New Jersey Devils. Ramage was assigned to AHL affiliate, the Binghamton Devils for the duration of the 2018–19 season. In his sixth season in the AHL, Ramage established new career best markers with 12 goals and 31 points in 74 games, however was unable to earn a recall to New Jersey.

As an impending free agent, Ramage opted to pursue a European career, signing his first contract abroad on a two-year agreement with German club, Eisbären Berlin of the DEL, on May 10, 2019.

After helping Berlin claim their eighth championship title in his second season with the club, Ramage left as a free agent to sign a one-year contract with Schwenninger Wild Wings on May 14, 2021.

Ramage would spend two seasons with the Wild Wings, captaining the club for the 2022–23 season in which he appeared in every regular season game with the Wild Wings, collecting 4 goals and 22 points. Unable to help Schwenninger advance to the post-season, it was announced Ramage would leave the club at the conclusion of his contract on March 9, 2023.

== Personal life ==
He married Emily Ramage (née Butrym) on July 11, 2015 in Libertyville, Illinois.

== Career statistics ==
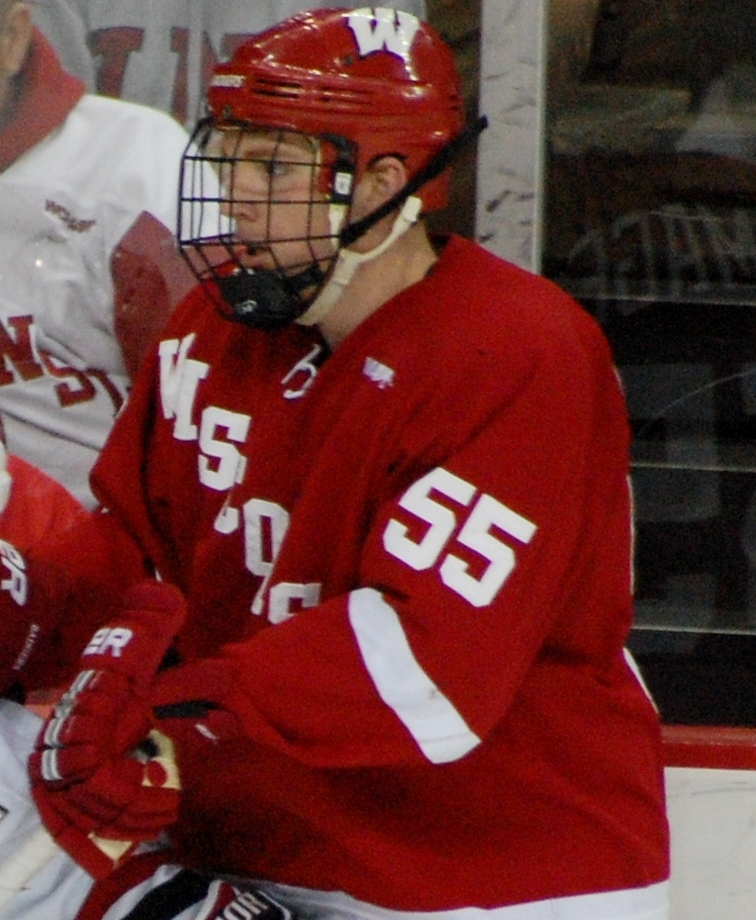
Ramage with the Wisconsin Badgers in 2011

=== Regular season and playoffs ===
			Regular season					Playoffs
Season	Team	League	GP	G	A	Pts	PIM	GP	G	A	Pts	PIM
2007–08	St. Louis Bandits	NAHL	45	4	5	9	75	—	—	—	—	—
2008–09	U.S. National Development Team	Ind.	54	2	8	10	44	—	—	—	—	—
2009–10	Wisconsin Badgers	WCHA	41	2	10	12	51	—	—	—	—	—
2010–11	Wisconsin Badgers	WCHA	37	1	10	11	59	—	—	—	—	—
2011–12	Wisconsin Badgers	WCHA	37	3	7	10	62	—	—	—	—	—
2012–13	Wisconsin Badgers	WCHA	42	8	12	20	65	—	—	—	—	—
2013–14	Abbotsford Heat	AHL	50	0	1	1	46	—	—	—	—	—
2013–14	Alaska Aces	ECHL	6	1	0	1	6	20	4	9	13	20
2014–15	Adirondack Flames	AHL	57	3	12	15	81	—	—	—	—	—
2014–15	Calgary Flames	NHL	1	0	0	0	0	—	—	—	—	—
2015–16	Lake Erie Monsters	AHL	68	8	19	27	67	1	0	0	0	0
2015–16	Columbus Blue Jackets	NHL	1	0	0	0	0	—	—	—	—	—
2016–17	Cleveland Monsters	AHL	69	4	21	25	67	—	—	—	—	—
2017–18	Cleveland Monsters	AHL	33	2	7	9	37	—	—	—	—	—
2017–18	Tucson Roadrunners	AHL	12	2	1	3	16	—	—	—	—	—
2017–18	Milwaukee Admirals	AHL	21	0	3	3	12	—	—	—	—	—
2018–19	Binghamton Devils	AHL	74	12	19	31	59	—	—	—	—	—
2019–20	Eisbären Berlin	DEL	40	1	12	13	76	—	—	—	—	—
2020–21	Eisbären Berlin	DEL	38	0	11	11	38	9	1	2	3	4
2021–22	Schwenninger Wild Wings	DEL	49	2	23	25	57	—	—	—	—	—
2022–23	Schwenninger Wild Wings	DEL	56	4	18	22	88	—	—	—	—	—
2023–24	Grizzlys Wolfsburg	DEL	52	1	14	15	54	4	0	1	1	8
2024–25	Grizzlys Wolfsburg	DEL	51	2	17	19	44	—	—	—	—	—
NHL totals			2	0	0	0	0	—	—	—	—	—

=== International ===
Year	Team	Event	Result	GP	G	A	Pts	PIM
2009	United States	WJC18	1st place, gold medalist(s)	7	0	1	1	2
2010	United States	WJC	1st place, gold medalist(s)	7	0	3	3	5
2011	United States	WJC	3rd place, bronze medalist(s)	6	0	0	0	2
Junior totals				20	0	4	4	9

== Awards and honors ==
Awards	Year
ECHL
Kelly Cup (Alaska Aces)	2014
AHL
Calder Cup (Lake Erie Monsters)	2016
DEL
Champion (Eisbären Berlin)	2021

== See also ==
- List of family relations in the NHL

== Notes ==
^{a} Sources disagree on where Ramage was born. The National Hockey League's website says Mississauga, Ontario, however the Calgary Flames Media Guide, the IIHF Guide and Record Book, Winnipeg Free Press, and The Canadian Press all give St. Louis. John's father Rob was playing with the Toronto Maple Leafs at the time of his birth, but had previously spent six seasons in St. Louis.
