= Roland Mayr =

German ice hockey player

- Born: June 9, 1984 (age 41) Augsburg, West Germany
- Height: 6 ft 1 in (185 cm)
- Weight: 214 lb (97 kg; 15 st 4 lb)
- Position: Left wing
- Shoots: Left
- DEL team: ERC Ingolstadt
- NHL draft: Undrafted
- Playing career: 2003–present

Roland Mayr (born June 9, 1984) is a German professional ice hockey player. He is currently playing for ERC Ingolstadt in the Deutsche Eishockey Liga (DEL).
