= Gerrit Fauser =

German ice hockey player (born 1989)

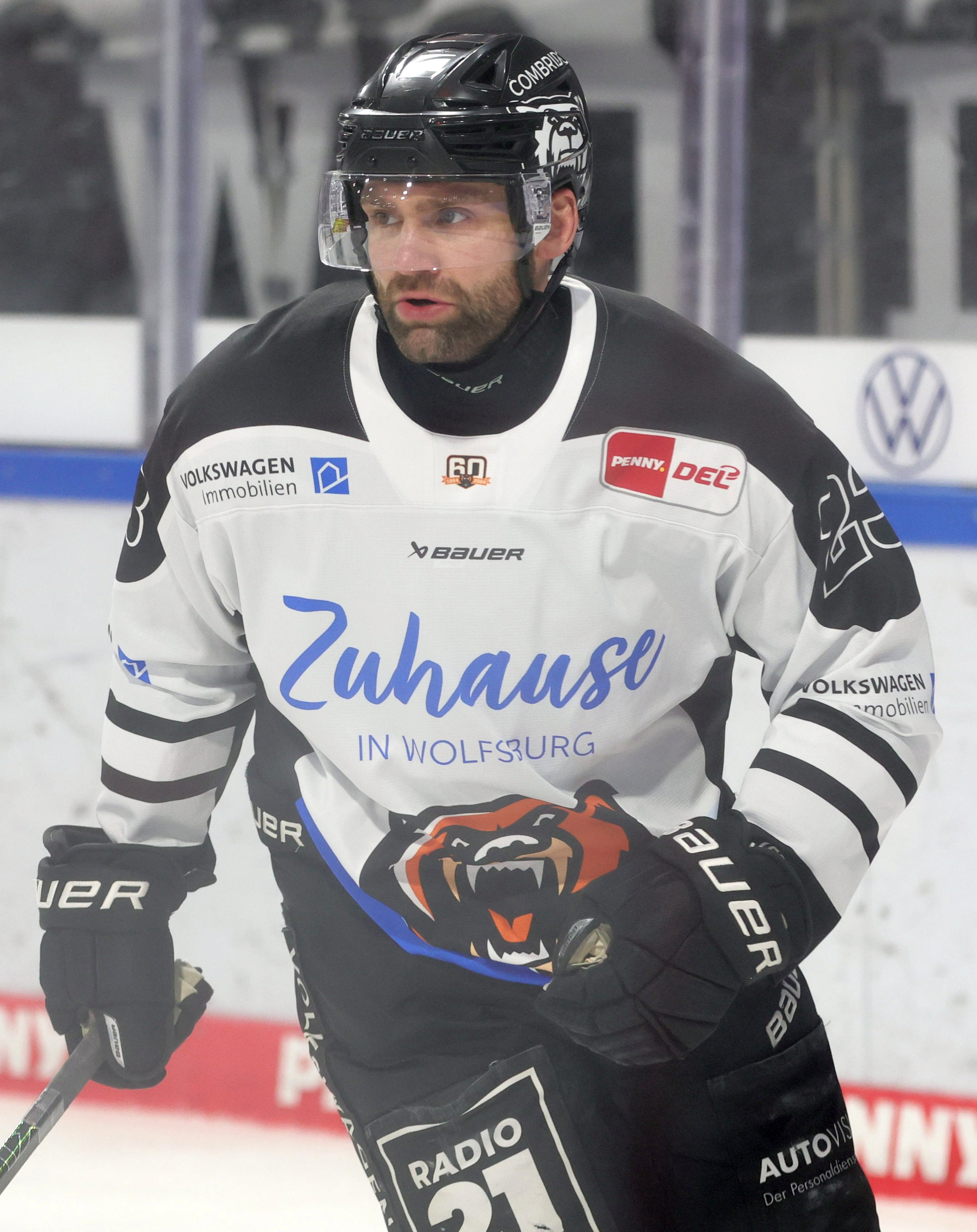
- Fauser in 2025
- Born: 13 July 1989 (age 36); Nuremberg, West Germany
- Height: 6 ft 0 in (183 cm)
- Weight: 192 lb (87 kg; 13 st 10 lb)
- Position: Centre
- Shoots: Left
- DEL team Former teams: Grizzlys Wolfsburg; Straubing Tigers; Kölner Haie; Hannover Scorpions
- National team: Germany
- NHL draft: Undrafted
- Playing career: 2007–present

Gerrit Fauser (born 13 July 1989) is a German professional ice hockey player, currently with the Grizzlys Wolfsburg in the Deutsche Eishockey Liga (DEL). He joined Wolfsburg from DEL rival the Hannover Scorpions.

== Career statistics ==
=== Regular season and playoffs ===
			Regular season					Playoffs
Season	Team	League	GP	G	A	Pts	PIM	GP	G	A	Pts	PIM
2004–05	Landshut Cannibals	DNL	34	7	4	11	14	—	—	—	—	—
2005–06	Landshut Cannibals	DNL	30	14	15	29	28	6	3	5	8	18
2006–07	Landshut Cannibals	DNL	11	9	5	14	6	—	—	—	—	—
2006–07	Straubing Tigers	DEL	2	0	0	0	0	—	—	—	—	—
2006–07	Landshut Cannibals	GER.2	38	2	5	7	20	3	0	0	0	4
2007–08	Gatineau Olympiques	QMJHL	50	16	9	25	25	19	4	3	7	4
2008–09	Gatineau Olympiques	QMJHL	36	7	3	10	26	—	—	—	—	—
2009–10	Kölner Haie	DEL	35	1	2	3	6	3	0	0	0	0
2009–10	Landshut Cannibals	GER.2	5	0	1	1	0	—	—	—	—	—
2010–11	Kölner Haie	DEL	18	2	0	2	4	—	—	—	—	—
2010–11	Fischtown Penguins	GER.2	36	10	6	16	53	5	3	1	4	8
2011–12	Hannover Scorpions	DEL	53	3	5	8	33	—	—	—	—	—
2012–13	Hannover Scorpions	DEL	46	11	13	24	24	—	—	—	—	—
2013–14	Grizzly Adams Wolfsburg	DEL	52	11	9	20	8	11	1	0	1	2
2014–15	Grizzly Adams Wolfsburg	DEL	48	7	6	13	18	7	0	3	3	0
2015–16	Grizzlys Wolfsburg	DEL	52	13	10	23	39	15	5	6	11	6
2016–17	Grizzlys Wolfsburg	DEL	50	11	14	25	10	18	7	5	12	0
2017–18	Grizzlys Wolfsburg	DEL	50	18	11	29	18	—	—	—	—	—
2018–19	Grizzlys Wolfsburg	DEL	38	7	12	19	10	—	—	—	—	—
2019–20	Grizzlys Wolfsburg	DEL	48	12	14	26	2	—	—	—	—	—
2020–21	Grizzlys Wolfsburg	DEL	31	6	5	11	16	9	3	2	5	0
2021–22	Grizzlys Wolfsburg	DEL	55	12	14	26	47	8	1	2	3	2
2022–23	Grizzlys Wolfsburg	DEL	40	3	6	9	2	13	2	3	5	2
2023–24	Grizzlys Wolfsburg	DEL	31	1	1	2	4	4	2	0	2	2
2024–25	Grizzlys Wolfsburg	DEL	36	3	0	3	2	—	—	—	—	—
DEL totals			684	121	122	243	243	88	21	21	42	14

Medal record

Representing Germany

Ice hockey

Olympic Games
Silver medal – second place	2018 Pyeongchang	

=== International ===
Year	Team	Event	GP	G	A	Pts	PIM
2006	Germany	U17	5	0	0	0	0
2007	Germany	U18	6	1	2	3	4
2009	Germany	WJC	5	1	3	4	10
2016	Germany	WC	4	0	0	0	0
2016	Germany	OGQ	3	0	0	0	0
2017	Germany	WC	8	0	0	0	0
2018	Germany	OG	7	0	0	0	0
2019	Germany	WC	8	0	1	1	0
Junior totals			16	2	5	7	14
Senior totals			30	0	1	1	0
