= Zach Redmond =

American ice hockey player (born 1988)

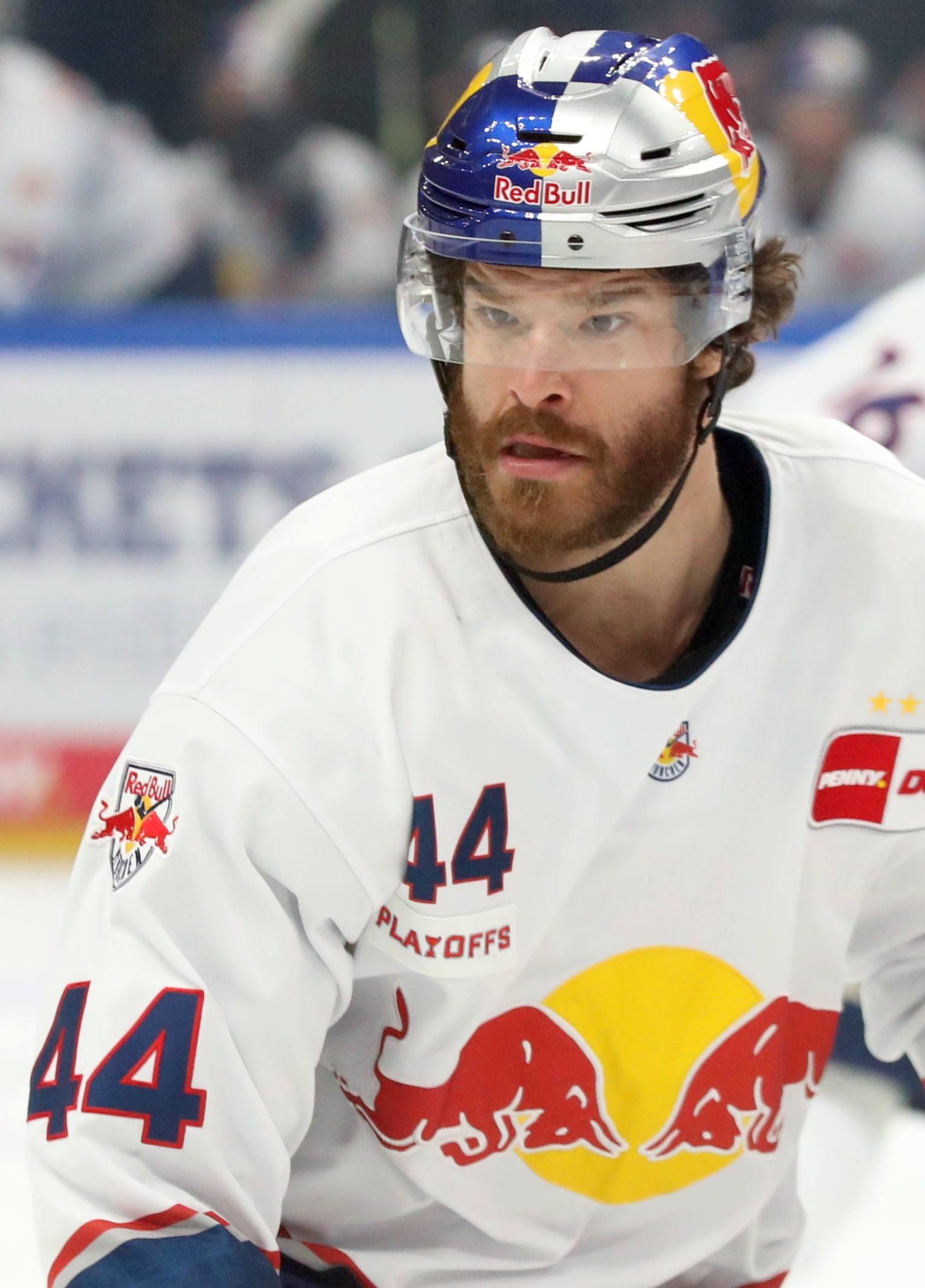
- Redmond with Munich in 2022
- Born: July 26, 1988 (age 38) Houston, Texas, U.S.
- Height: 6 ft 2 in (188 cm)
- Weight: 205 lb (93 kg; 14 st 9 lb)
- Position: Defense
- Shot: Right
- Played for: Winnipeg Jets; Colorado Avalanche; Montreal Canadiens; Buffalo Sabres; EHC München
- National team: United States
- NHL draft: 184th overall, 2008; Atlanta Thrashers
- Playing career: 2011–2023

Zachary Thomas Redmond (born July 26, 1988) is an American former professional ice hockey defenseman. He was selected in the seventh round, 184th overall, by the Atlanta Thrashers of the National Hockey League (NHL) in the 2008 NHL entry draft and also played for the Winnipeg Jets, Colorado Avalanche, Montreal Canadiens, and Buffalo Sabres.

== Early life ==
Redmond was born in Houston, Texas and moved to Traverse City, Michigan at the age of 2. He was born a triplet, along with brother Alex and sister Meghan. At the age of 15, Redmond suffered a transient ischemic attack stroke; as a result, he was forced to relearn how to walk and talk, but later returned to continue his junior hockey career.

== Playing career ==
Following his collegiate career with Ferris State University, Redmond was signed to a three-year, entry-level contract with the Atlanta Thrashers on April 6, 2011. Following the Thrashers' relocation, his NHL rights were then transferred to the Winnipeg Jets.

Redmond scored his first career NHL goal, a short-handed marker, on February 7, 2013, against James Reimer of the Toronto Maple Leafs. On February 21, 2013, Redmond was rushed to a hospital in the Raleigh, North Carolina, area to repair a laceration to his right femoral artery and vein in his mid-thigh region, after he was seriously cut during the team's morning skate. He was expected to miss the remainder of the 2012–13 season. On April 4, however, Redmond resumed skating with his teammates and revealed that his recovery was well ahead of schedule, with doctors and trainers describing the pace of his recovery as "miraculous." He was expected to be ready for training camp in September 2013 and did not rule out the possibility of an earlier return if the Jets were to enjoy a deep 2013 Stanley Cup playoff run.

Redmond marked his return to hockey in the following 2013–14 season, with the Jets' American Hockey League (AHL) affiliate, the St. John's IceCaps. After two games with the IceCaps, he was then recalled to Winnipeg on November 3, 2013. By season's end, Redmond was recalled four times by the Jets, appearing in only ten games with three points. Having played primarily in the AHL, he was instrumental in helping St. John's reach their first Calder Cup Finals.

Falling short of the NHL games-played requirement throughout his entry-level contract, partly due to the serious leg injury he sustained the previous season, Redmond attained free-agent status. On July 1, 2014, he was subsequently signed to a two-year contract with the Colorado Avalanche. Redmond made the Avalanche roster to begin the 2014–15 season and later made his Avalanche debut, recording an assist in a 7–3 victory over the Vancouver Canucks on October 24, 2014. He scored his first Avalanche goal in his fifth game with the team in a 4–3 defeat to the Philadelphia Flyers on November 9, 2014. Redmond further cemented a position on the blueline when he scored a career-high two goals, including the game-winner, in the final minutes against the Carolina Hurricanes on November 22. In his first full season in the NHL, Redmond finished third amongst Avalanche defenseman in scoring, with five goals and 20 points in 59 games.

At the conclusion of his contract with the Avalanche, Redmond left as a free agent to sign a two-year contract with the Montreal Canadiens on July 1, 2016.

Approaching the final year of his contract with the Canadiens and unable to make the NHL roster to open the 2017–18 season, Redmond was traded by Montreal to the Buffalo Sabres for Nicolas Deslauriers on October 4, 2017. He was immediately reassigned to AHL affiliate, the Rochester Americans. Having recorded three points in his first four games with the Americans, Redmond was recalled by the injury-struck Sabres on October 21, 2017. Near the conclusion of the 2017–18 regular season, on April 5, 2018, Redmond was named to the AHL Second All-Star Team.

On June 13, 2018, Redmond opted to continue his tenure with the Americans, agreeing as an impending free agent to a two-year AHL contract.

At the conclusion of his contract with the Americans, having been productive over the course of his three seasons with limited NHL interest, Redmond opted to pursue a European career, agreeing to an initial one-year contract with German outfit, EHC München of the Deutsche Eishockey Liga (DEL), on April 26, 2020.

Following three seasons with München claiming the German championship in the 2022–23 season, Redmond announced his retirement from professional hockey following 12 seasons while accepting a player development coaching role with the Buffalo Sabres on August 10, 2023.

== International play ==
Medal record

Representing United States

Ice hockey

World Championships
Bronze medal – third place	2015 Czech Republic	

At the conclusion of his first season with the Avalanche, Redmond was selected to represent the United States for the first time at the international stage in the 2015 World Championships in Prague. He made his debut for Team USA in a 4–2 round robin win against Russia on May 4, 2015. Redmond would finish the Tournament with one assist in five games to help claim a Bronze medal against hosts Czech Republic on May 17.

== Career statistics ==
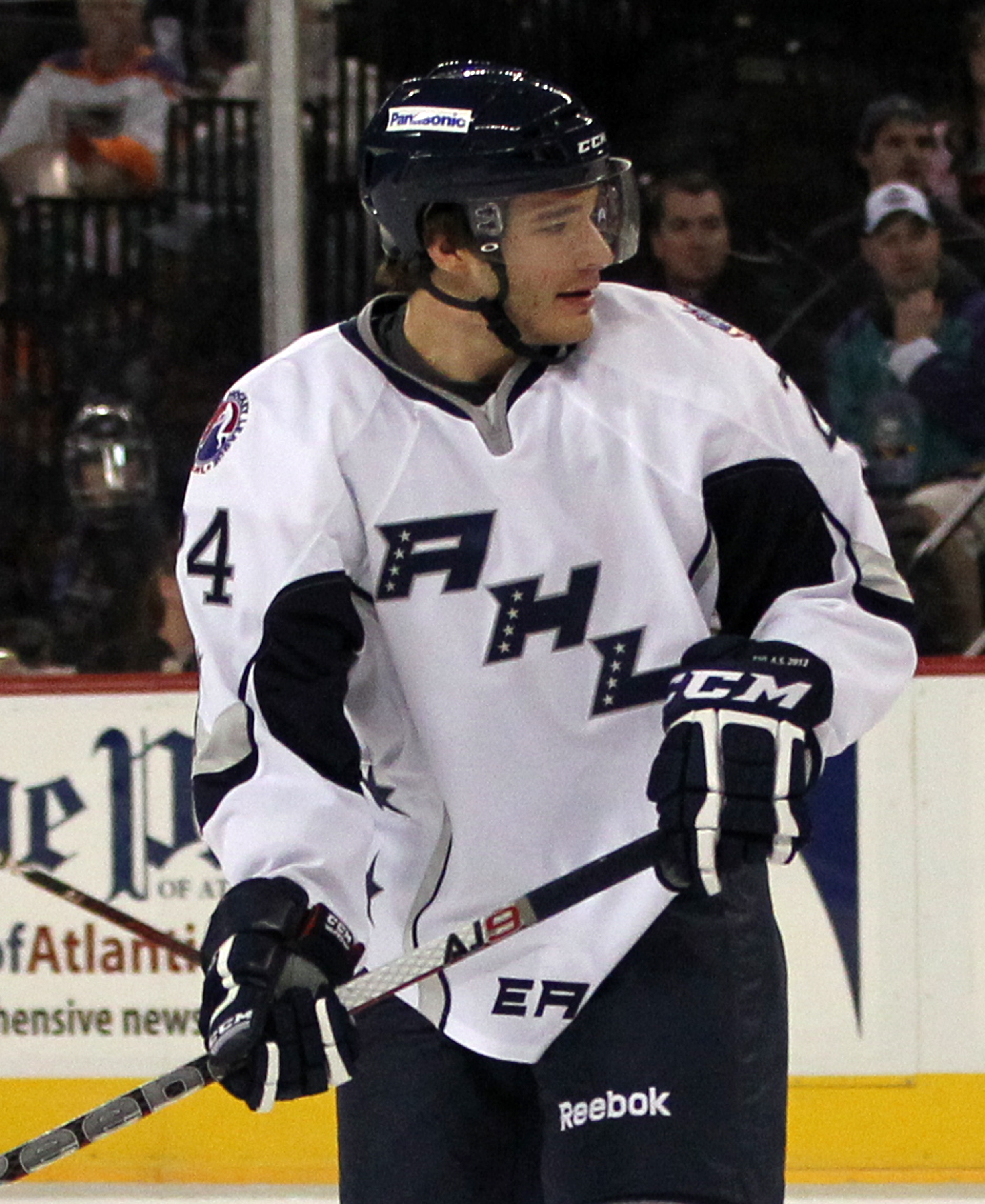
Redmond in 2012.

=== Regular season and playoffs ===
			Regular season					Playoffs
Season	Team	League	GP	G	A	Pts	PIM	GP	G	A	Pts	PIM
2004–05	Compuware 18U AAA	AAA	20	1	13	14	12	—	—	—	—	—
2005–06	Sioux Falls Stampede	USHL	48	4	7	11	57	11	1	2	3	4
2006–07	Sioux Falls Stampede	USHL	60	8	31	39	37	8	3	7	10	8
2007–08	Ferris State University	CCHA	37	6	13	19	33	—	—	—	—	—
2008–09	Ferris State University	CCHA	38	3	21	24	48	—	—	—	—	—
2009–10	Ferris State University	CCHA	40	6	21	27	20	—	—	—	—	—
2010–11	Ferris State University	CCHA	26	7	13	20	20	—	—	—	—	—
2010–11	Chicago Wolves	AHL	3	0	0	0	4	—	—	—	—	—
2011–12	St. John's IceCaps	AHL	72	8	23	31	33	10	1	2	3	10
2012–13	St. John's IceCaps	AHL	38	8	11	19	34	—	—	—	—	—
2012–13	Winnipeg Jets	NHL	8	1	3	4	12	—	—	—	—	—
2013–14	St. John's IceCaps	AHL	40	6	18	24	26	21	2	12	14	16
2013–14	Winnipeg Jets	NHL	10	1	2	3	0	—	—	—	—	—
2014–15	Colorado Avalanche	NHL	59	5	15	20	24	—	—	—	—	—
2015–16	San Antonio Rampage	AHL	11	3	4	7	6	—	—	—	—	—
2015–16	Colorado Avalanche	NHL	37	2	4	6	10	—	—	—	—	—
2016–17	Montreal Canadiens	NHL	16	0	5	5	2	—	—	—	—	—
2016–17	St. John's IceCaps	AHL	26	4	14	18	8	4	1	1	2	2
2017–18	Rochester Americans	AHL	66	15	32	47	38	3	2	0	2	2
2017–18	Buffalo Sabres	NHL	3	0	0	0	2	—	—	—	—	—
2018–19	Rochester Americans	AHL	58	21	29	50	34	3	0	0	0	2
2019–20	Rochester Americans	AHL	59	5	25	30	24	—	—	—	—	—
2020–21	EHC München	DEL	37	8	25	33	12	2	0	0	0	2
2021–22	EHC München	DEL	50	16	25	41	28	11	5	1	6	6
2022–23	EHC München	DEL	53	9	28	38	10	12	1	6	7	2
NHL totals			133	9	29	38	50	—	—	—	—	—

=== International ===
Year	Team	Event	Result	GP	G	A	Pts	PIM
2015	United States	WC	3rd place, bronze medalist(s)	5	0	1	1	2
Senior totals				5	0	1	1	2

== Awards and honors ==
Award	Year
USHL
Curt Hammer Award	2007
Clark Cup Champion	2007
College
All-CCHA Second Team	2009–10
All-CCHA First Team	2010–11
AHCA West Second-Team All-American	2010–11
AHL
Second All-Star Team	2017–18
Eddie Shore Award Top Defensemen	2018–19
First All-Star Team	2018–19
DEL
Top Defensemen	2021–22
