= Taylor Leier =

Canadian ice hockey player

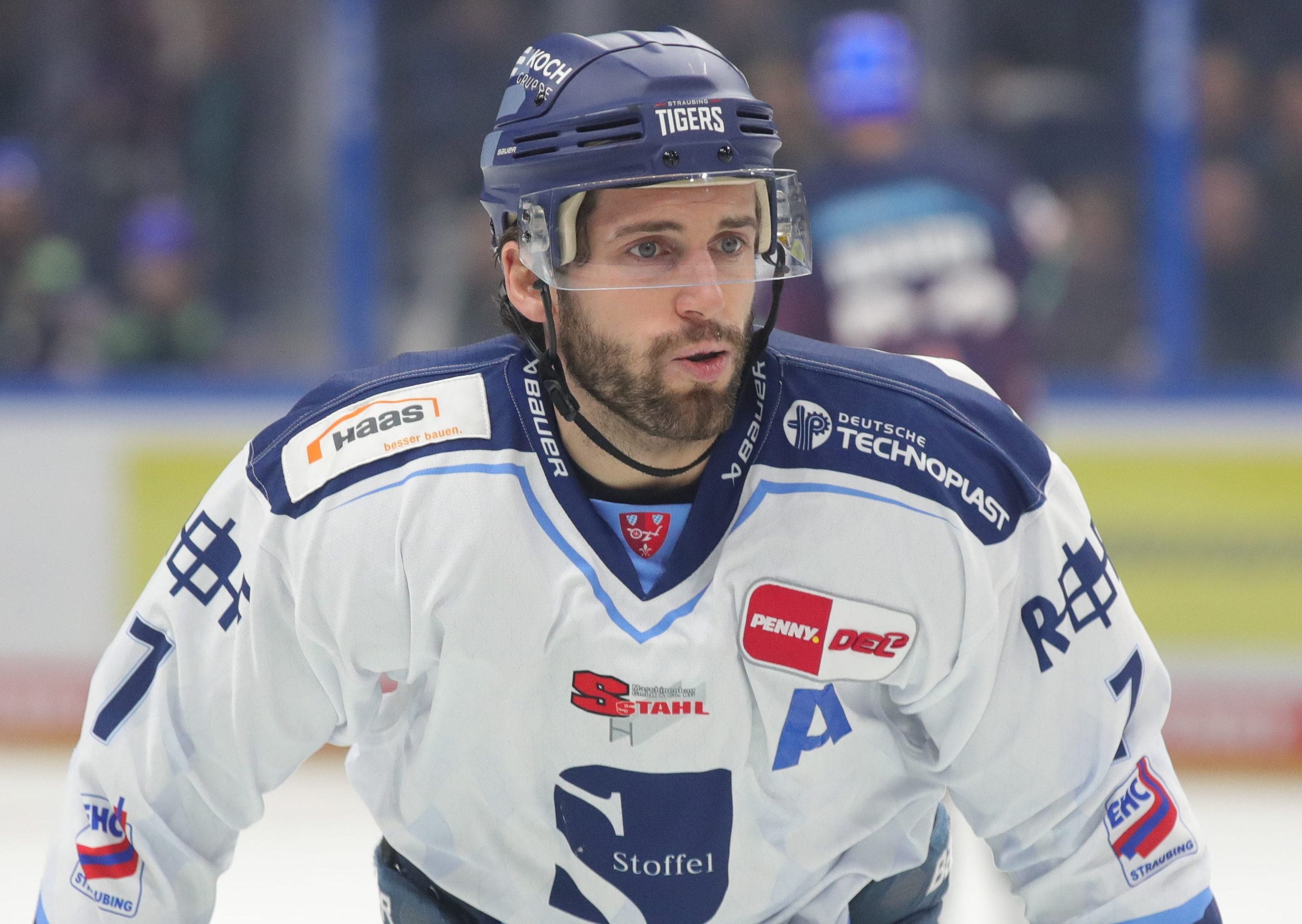
- Leier with the Straubing Tigers in 2022
- Born: February 15, 1994 (age 32) Saskatoon, Saskatchewan, Canada
- Height: 5 ft 11 in (180 cm)
- Weight: 185 lb (84 kg; 13 st 3 lb)
- Position: Left wing
- Shoots: Left
- DEL team Former teams: Straubing Tigers; Philadelphia Flyers; HC Oceláři Třinec; Adler Mannheim; Linköping HC
- NHL draft: 117th overall, 2012; Philadelphia Flyers
- Playing career: 2014–present

Taylor Leier (born February 15, 1994) is a Canadian professional ice hockey player who is currently playing for Straubing Tigers of the Deutsche Eishockey Liga (DEL). He was drafted in the fourth round, 117th overall, at the 2012 NHL entry draft by the Philadelphia Flyers.

== Playing career ==
Leier began his major junior hockey career in the Western Hockey League with the Portland Winterhawks who drafted him 24th overall in the 2009 WHL Bantam Draft. While playing with the Winterhawks, Leier was drafted 117th overall by the Philadelphia Flyers in the 2012 NHL entry draft.

Leier signed a three-year entry-level contract with the Flyers on September 9, 2013. He made his NHL debut against the Carolina Hurricanes on November 14, 2015.

During the 2016–17 season, Leier scored his first NHL goal with the Flyers on December 17, 2016, against the Dallas Stars. He was later returned to the Phantoms and represented Lehigh Valley at the 2017 AHL All-Star Game where he was awarded MVP of the game. In July 2017, he signed a 1-year, two-way, $807,000 contract extension with the Flyers. On July 15, 2018, after Leier applied for arbitration, he signed a one-year deal with the Flyers worth $720,000.

After attending Flyers training camp prior to the 2018–19 season, Leier was a late roster cut and was loaned to the Phantoms on October 2. On January 17, 2019, Leier was traded to the Buffalo Sabres for Justin Bailey. Immediately assigned to AHL affiliate, the Rochester Americans, Leier tallied 12 goals and 23 points in 35 games to close out the campaign.

On June 28, 2019, Leier opted to continue his tenure with the Americans, agreeing to a one-year AHL contract. During the 2019–20 season, Leier returned from injury scoring 7 goals in 17 games with the Americans, before securing a one-year, two-way NHL contract for the remainder of the season with parent affiliate, the Buffalo Sabres on February 17, 2020.

As a free agent from the Americans, Leier belatedly opted to extend his career in Europe, signing mid-season in to the 2020–21 campaign with Czech club, HC Oceláři Třinec of the ELH, on January 3, 2021. His contract with Oceláři Třinec was terminated at the end of January after playing 10 games with the team. On February 2, 2021, Leier signed with Adler Mannheim in the Deutsche Eishockey Liga for the remainder of the 2020–21 season.

On August 26, 2021, Leier signed with the Straubing Tigers, also of the DEL, alongside other former Flyers Jason Akeson and Brandon Manning.

== Personal life ==
Leier grew up in Saskatchewan with parents Tim and Cindy Leier and younger brother Keaton. Keaton is a professional ballet dancer with the Atlanta Ballet.

== Career statistics ==
=== Regular season and playoffs ===
			Regular season					Playoffs
Season	Team	League	GP	G	A	Pts	PIM	GP	G	A	Pts	PIM
2008–09	Saskatoon Contacts	SMHL	2	2	0	2	0	—	—	—	—	—
2009–10	Saskatoon Contacts	SMHL	41	17	24	41	30	11	5	2	7	0
2010–11	Saskatoon Contacts	SMHL	44	31	43	74	32	9	7	6	13	8
2011–12	Portland Winterhawks	WHL	72	13	24	37	36	22	5	2	7	12
2012–13	Portland Winterhawks	WHL	64	27	35	62	63	21	9	7	16	12
2013–14	Portland Winterhawks	WHL	62	37	42	79	42	21	6	20	26	10
2014–15	Lehigh Valley Phantoms	AHL	73	13	18	31	18	—	—	—	—	—
2015–16	Lehigh Valley Phantoms	AHL	71	20	29	49	37	—	—	—	—	—
2015–16	Philadelphia Flyers	NHL	6	0	0	0	0	—	—	—	—	—
2016–17	Lehigh Valley Phantoms	AHL	48	13	24	37	16	5	1	0	1	2
2016–17	Philadelphia Flyers	NHL	10	1	1	2	4	—	—	—	—	—
2017–18	Philadelphia Flyers	NHL	39	1	4	5	6	—	—	—	—	—
2018–19	Lehigh Valley Phantoms	AHL	34	10	9	19	26	—	—	—	—	—
2018–19	Rochester Americans	AHL	35	12	11	23	20	3	0	1	1	0
2019–20	Rochester Americans	AHL	27	11	6	17	4	—	—	—	—	—
2020–21	HC Oceláři Třinec	ELH	10	1	4	5	4	—	—	—	—	—
2020–21	Adler Mannheim	DEL	20	5	5	10	10	6	1	1	2	0
2021–22	Straubing Tigers	DEL	54	16	24	40	20	4	2	0	2	2
2022–23	Straubing Tigers	DEL	55	21	34	55	23	7	0	4	4	0
2023–24	Linköping HC	SHL	30	4	2	6	4	—	—	—	—	—
2024–25	Straubing Tigers	DEL	49	12	24	36	25	7	0	2	2	2
NHL totals			55	2	5	7	10	—	—	—	—	—

=== International ===
Year	Team	Event	Result	GP	G	A	Pts	PIM
2014	Canada	WJC	4th	7	0	0	0	6
Junior totals				7	0	0	0	6
