= 2020–21 DEL season =

- League: Deutsche Eishockey Liga
- Sport: Ice hockey
- Duration: 17 December 2020 – 7 May 2021
- Games: 364
- Teams: 14

Regular season
- Season champions: Adler Mannheim
- Season MVP: Marcel Noebels
- Top scorer: Joe Whitney (45 points)

Finals
- Champions: Eisbären Berlin
- Runners-up: Grizzlys Wolfsburg
- Finals MVP: Ryan McKiernan

DEL seasons
- ← 2019–20 2021–22 →

The 2020–21 Deutsche Eishockey Liga season was the 27th season since the founding of the Deutsche Eishockey Liga. Due to the COVID-19 pandemic, the league announced 13 November 2020 as the start date, which was later postponed to a later date. On 19 November 2020, the DEL announced that the season would start on 17 December 2020.

Eisbären Berlin won their eighth title, after defeating the Grizzlys Wolfsburg in three games.

== Format ==
The season saw the same 14 teams as last year, as all teams were given a license. Adler Mannheim will be the defending champions from the 2018–19 DEL season as the 2019–20 season was ended after the regular season. At that point, EHC Red Bull München, who won three consecutive DEL titles until Mannheim’s 2019 triumph (a 4–1 series win against Munich), were the league leaders and had clinched the first seed for the DEL playoffs.

This season would have marked the return of promotion and relegation, as the last placed team would have been relegated to the second tier DEL2 and the 2020–21 DEL2 champions would have replaced them for the 2021–22 season DEL. On 23 October 2020, the relegation rule was moved to next season. Still, the DEL2 champion can be promoted at the end of this season, so next season could be played with 15 teams. The 14 teams played the regular season in two groups (North and South). They played the teams from the same group four times and the teams from the other group twice. After that, the top four clubs from both groups advanced to the playoffs. The quarterfinals were played within the group before, from the semifinals on, it was mixed. All playoff rounds were best of three.

== Teams ==
Teams of the 2020–21 DEL season
Blue: North group; Yellow: South group

Team	City	Arena	Capacity
Augsburger Panther	Augsburg	Curt Frenzel Stadium	6,218
Eisbären Berlin	Berlin	Mercedes-Benz Arena	14,200
Fischtown Pinguins	Bremerhaven	Eisarena Bremerhaven	4,674
Düsseldorfer EG	Düsseldorf	ISS Dome	13,400
ERC Ingolstadt	Ingolstadt	Saturn Arena	4,815
Iserlohn Roosters	Iserlohn	Eissporthalle Iserlohn	5,000
Kölner Haie	Cologne	Lanxess Arena	18,500
Krefeld Pinguine	Krefeld	König Palast	9,000
Adler Mannheim	Mannheim	SAP Arena	13,600
EHC Red Bull München	Munich	Olympia Eishalle	6,256
Nürnberg Ice Tigers	Nuremberg	Arena Nürnberger Versicherung	7,810
Schwenninger Wild Wings	Villingen-Schwenningen	Helios Arena	6,215
Straubing Tigers	Straubing	Eisstadion am Pulverturm	6,000
Grizzlys Wolfsburg	Wolfsburg	Eis Arena Wolfsburg	4,660

== Regular season ==
=== North ===
==== Standings ====
Pos	Team	Pld	W	OTW	OTL	L	GF	GA	GD	PCT	Qualification
1	Eisbären Berlin	38	23	1	5	9	137	91	+46	.667	Playoffs
2	Fischtown Pinguins	38	21	2	1	14	124	105	+19	.596	Playoffs
3	Grizzlys Wolfsburg	38	13	8	3	14	104	94	+10	.509	Playoffs
4	Iserlohn Roosters	37	13	5	7	12	113	116	−3	.505	Playoffs
5	Düsseldorfer EG	38	14	4	5	15	116	119	−3	.482	
6	Kölner Haie	38	11	4	5	18	114	135	−21	.404	
7	Krefeld Pinguine	38	4	1	4	29	74	167	−93	.158	

Source: DEL
Rules for classification: 1) points; 2) head-to-head points; 3) head-to-head goal difference; 4) head-to-head number of goals scored.

==== Results ====
Home \ Away	BER	BRE	DÜS	ISE	KÖL	KRE	WOL	BER	BRE	DÜS	ISE	KÖL	KRE	WOL
Eisbären Berlin	—	3–2	4–2	4–2	5–0	5–0	2–3 (Note: Overtime)	—	2–0	8–1	5–2	4–2	6–1	2–3 (Note: Shootout)
Fischtown Pinguins	5–3	—	4–3	5–2	3–4	6–2	5–2	1–5	—	1–4	5–3	0–2	4–2	4–3
Düsseldorfer EG	5–4	1–4	—	3–1	5–2	1–3	4–5	5–3	2–5	—	2–3	3–6	3–0	1–2
Iserlohn Roosters	5–2	2–3	5–6	—	6–5	3–6	5–3	1–4	1–5	3–0	—	3–2	5–2	4–0
Kölner Haie	1–6	3–4	4–5	3–4	—	5–4	2–1	3–6	3–2	1–5	3–2	—	1–3	1–3
Krefeld Pinguine	2–5	0–2	3–6	2–3	2–7	—	2–3	1–6	4–5	3–1	3–7	0–7	—	2–3
Grizzlys Wolfsburg	1–0	1–2	1–2	1–2	4–5	4–1	—	6–4	4–3	2–0	2–1	2–3	5–2	—

Source: DEL
Legend: Blue = home team win; Yellow = draw; Red = away team win.

=== South ===
==== Standings ====
Pos	Team	Pld	W	OTW	OTL	L	GF	GA	GD	PCT	Qualification
1	Adler Mannheim	38	23	8	2	5	116	71	+45	.763	Playoffs
2	EHC Red Bull München	38	24	2	3	9	159	102	+57	.693	Playoffs
3	ERC Ingolstadt	38	15	5	4	14	123	109	+14	.518	Playoffs
4	Straubing Tigers	37	15	2	4	16	103	102	+1	.477	Playoffs
5	Schwenninger Wild Wings	38	14	5	2	17	111	109	+2	.474	
6	Augsburger Panther	38	11	6	1	20	107	134	−27	.404	
7	Nürnberg Ice Tigers	38	10	1	8	19	94	141	−47	.351	

Source: DEL
Rules for classification: 1) points; 2) head-to-head points; 3) head-to-head goal difference; 4) head-to-head number of goals scored.

==== Results ====
Home \ Away	ING	AUG	MAN	MUN	NÜR	SCH	STR	ING	AUG	MAN	MUN	NÜR	SCH	STR
ERC Ingolstadt	—	5–1	2–3	3–2	8–0	1–2	4–3	—	2–3	4–6	2–5	7–0	3–1	3–2
Augsburger Panther	6–3	—	3–4	2–1	1–4	2–3	3–2	4–7	—	4–3	2–5	3–4	0–5	3–6
Adler Mannheim	2–1	2–1	—	3–2	5–1	3–2	3–0	4–1	4–2	—	2–0	4–2	1–3	4–1
EHC Red Bull München	4–6	3–2	3–6	—	6–0	4–3	6–2	1–3	5–6	4–5	—	5–0	2–1	6–3
Nürnberg Ice Tigers	1–4	5–6	2–3	3–4	—	1–2	4–3	2–5	2–3	3–4	2–4	—	3–4	3–2
Schwenninger Wild Wings	2–3	4–0	0–4	2–3	4–2	—	5–2	2–1	3–4	2–5	4–6	4–1	—	4–1
Straubing Tigers	3–1	1–2	2–1	3–4	3–2	4–3	—	2–3	2–1	3–2	4–5	3–4	5–1	—

Source: DEL
Legend: Blue = home team win; Yellow = draw; Red = away team win.

=== Intra-groups games ===
Home \ Away	AUG	BER	BRE	DÜS	ING	ISE	KÖL	KRE	MAN	MUN	NÜR	SCH	STR	WOL
Augsburger Panther		6–5	5–2	1–7		2–5	4–2	5–0						1–4
Eisbären Berlin	5–3				1–0				1–3	0–5	4–3	6–2	1–0	
Fischtown Pinguins	8–1				5–2				5–0	1–2	4–2	5–2	0–4	
Düsseldorfer EG	5–3				5–4				2–3	3–2	4–1	5–2	0–4	
ERC Ingolstadt		4–3	3–2	4–3		2–3	3–2	6–3						1–3
Iserlohn Roosters	3–4				3–0				2–4	8–3	3–2	3–2	0–5	
Kölner Haie	2–1				4–3				2–3	2–5	6–3	2–4	4–5	
Krefeld Pinguine	0–3				5–6				0–1	1–8	0–3	1–2	0–4	
Adler Mannheim		1–4	1–2	3–0		2–1	5–1	4–2						2–1
EHC Red Bull München		4–1	6–2	6–1		4–2	6–2	9–2						4–3
Nürnberg Ice Tigers		1–3	3–1	6–5		7–3	3–2	5–3						2–1
Schwenninger Wild Wings		4–2	4–5	3–2		3–2	5–3	5–6						4–1
Straubing Tigers		1–3	5–2	0–4		Cancelled	3–5	3–1						2–4
Grizzlys Wolfsburg	1–4				6–3				0–1	5–1	4–3	5–3	2–4	

Source: DEL
Legend: Blue = home team win; Yellow = draw; Red = away team win.

== Playoffs ==
All rounds were played in a best of three format. The first round was played in the regional group.

=== Bracket ===
Quarterfinals
N1	Eisbären Berlin	2
N4	Iserlohn Roosters	1
N2	Fischtown Pinguins	1
N3	Grizzlys Wolfsburg	2
(Pairings are reseeded after the first round)
S1	Adler Mannheim	2
S4	Straubing Tigers	1
S2	EHC Red Bull München	0
S3	ERC Ingolstadt	2

Semifinals
N1	Eisbären Berlin	2
S3	ERC Ingolstadt	1
S1	Adler Mannheim	1
N3	Grizzlys Wolfsburg	2

Finals
N1	Eisbären Berlin	2
N3	Grizzlys Wolfsburg	1

=== Quarterfinals ===
The quarterfinals were played between 20 and 24 April 2021 in a best-of-three mode.

==== Eisbären Berlin vs Iserlohn Roosters ====
20 April 2021	Eisbären Berlin	3–4	Iserlohn Roosters	Mercedes-Benz Arena, Berlin	Recap
Matt White – 01:29; Ryan McKiernan – 05:17		First period	04:54 – Casey Bailey; 13:32 – Brent Raedeke
Ryan McKiernan – 21:37		Second period	No scoring
No scoring		Third period	49:05 – Joe Whitney; 59:01 – Brent Aubin
Mathias Niederberger (25 saves / 29 shots)		Goalie stats	Andreas Jenike (28 saves / 31 shots)

22 April 2021	Iserlohn Roosters	0–6	Eisbären Berlin	Eissporthalle Iserlohn, Iserlohn	Recap
No scoring		First period	08:10 – Zach Boychuk; 19:38 – Ryan McKiernan
No scoring		Second period	23:45– Lukas Reichel
No scoring		Third period	45:17 – Zach Boychuk; 53:13 – Simon Després (EN); 55:47 – Sebastian Streu
Andreas Jenike (25 saves / 31 shots)		Goalie stats	Mathias Niederberger (25 saves / 25 shots)

24 April 2021	Eisbären Berlin	5–3	Iserlohn Roosters	Mercedes-Benz Arena, Berlin	Recap
No scoring		First period	02:28 – Marko Friedrich; 08:03 – Marko Friedrich
Matt White – 20:49; Matt White – 29:18; Matt White – 31:01; Kris Foucault – 32:37		Second period	39:54 – Casey Bailey (PP)
Ryan McKiernan – 51:39		Third period	No scoring
Mathias Niederberger (22 saves / 25 shots)		Goalie stats	Andreas Jenike (39 saves / 44 shots)

Berlin won series 2–1

==== Fischtown Pinguins vs Grizzlys Wolfsburg ====
20 April 2021	Fischtown Pinguins	4–2	Grizzlys Wolfsburg	Eisarena Bremerhaven, Bremerhaven	Recap
No scoring		First period	06:02 – Spencer Machacek
Tye McGinn – 24:38		Second period	35:01 – Gerrit Fauser (PP)
Dominik Uher (PP) – 55:07; Jan Urbas – 58:57; Dominik Uher (EN) – 59:04		Third period	No scoring
Brandon Maxwell (23 saves / 25 shots)		Goalie stats	Dustin Strahlmeier (29 saves / 33 shots)

22 April 2021	Grizzlys Wolfsburg	3–2	Fischtown Pinguins	Eis Arena Wolfsburg, Wolfsburg	Recap
Garrett Festerling (PP) – 16:43		First period	No scoring
Spencer Machacek – 34:14; Garrett Festerling (PP) – 39:54		Second period	25:57 – Mitch Wahl; 27:04 – Miha Verlič
No scoring		Third period	No scoring
Dustin Strahlmeier (23 saves / 25 shots)		Goalie stats	Brandon Maxwell (34 saves / 36 shots)

24 April 2021	Fischtown Pinguins	2–3	OT	Grizzlys Wolfsburg	Eisarena Bremerhaven, Bremerhaven	Recap
No scoring		First period		03:28 – Jeff Likens
Mitch Wahl (PP) – 33:30		Second period		28:20 – Max Görtz
Jan Urbas (EA) – 59:57		Third period		No scoring
No scoring		First overtime period		65:08 – Phillip Bruggisser
Brandon Maxwell (24 saves / 25 shots)		Goalie stats		Dustin Strahlmeier (25 saves / 27 shots)

Wolfsburg won series 2–1

==== Adler Mannheim vs Straubing Tigers ====
20 April 2021	Adler Mannheim	2–3	OT	Straubing Tigers	SAP Arena, Mannheim	Recap
Denis Reul – 02:05; Taylor Leier (PP) – 13:45		First period		02:13 – Antoine Laganière; 18:44 – Andreas Eder (PP)
No scoring		Second period		No scoring
No scoring		Third period		No scoring
No scoring		First overtime period		61:39 – Jeremy Williams (PP)
Dennis Endras (21 saves / 24 shots)		Goalie stats		Sebastian Vogl (19 saves / 21 shots)

22 April 2021	Straubing Tigers	1–3	Adler Mannheim	Eisstadion am Pulverturm, Straubing	Recap
No scoring		First period	03:33 – Tommi Huhtala (PP); 04:05 – Tommi Huhtala; 09:36 – Jason Bast
No scoring		Second period	No scoring
Sena Acolatse – 46:46		Third period	No scoring
Sebastian Vogl (27 saves / 29 shots)		Goalie stats	Dennis Endras (21 saves / 22 shots)

24 April 2021	Adler Mannheim	4–3	OT	Straubing Tigers	SAP Arena, Mannheim	Recap
No scoring		First period		04:15 – T. J. Mulock; 09:38 – Corey Tropp
No scoring		Second period		30:31 – Antoine Laganière (SH)
Sinan Akdag (PP, EA) – 49:59; Brendan Shinnimin (PP, EA) – 51:20; Thomas Larkin – 54:25		Third period		No scoring
Nico Krämmer – 70:36		First overtime period		No scoring
Dennis Endras (24 saves / 27 shots)		Goalie stats		Sebastian Vogl (33 saves / 37 shots)

Mannheim won series 2–1

==== EHC Red Bull München vs ERC Ingolstadt ====
20 April 2021	EHC Red Bull München	1–4	ERC Ingolstadt	Olympia Eishalle, Munich	Recap
No scoring		First period	04:45 – Wojciech Stachowiak; 09:45 – Tim Wohlgemuth
Chris Bourque – 31:37		Second period	23:53 – Wayne Simpson; 29:13 – Louis-Marc Aubry
No scoring		Third period	No scoring
Danny aus den Birken (25 saves / 29 shots)		Goalie stats	Michael Garteig (38 saves / 39 shots)

22 April 2021	ERC Ingolstadt	5–4	OT	EHC Red Bull München	Saturn Arena, Ingolstadt	Recap
Ryan Kuffner – 19:23		First period		11:26 – Daryl Boyle
Tim Wohlgemuth – 24:57		Second period		26:47 – John-Jason Peterka; 31:48 – Yasin Ehliz (PP); 38:00 – Andrew Ebbett
Wayne Simpson – 49:44; Louis-Marc Aubry (PP) – 50:51		Third period		No scoring
Brandon Defazio – 62:00		First overtime period		No scoring
Michael Garteig (31 saves / 35 shots)		Goalie stats		Danny aus den Birken (25 saves / 30 shots)

Ingolstadt won series 2–0

=== Semifinals ===
The semifinals were played between 26 and 29 April 2021 in a best-of-three format.

==== Eisbären Berlin vs ERC Ingolstadt ====
26 April 2021	Eisbären Berlin	3–4	ERC Ingolstadt	Mercedes-Benz Arena, Berlin	Recap
Mark Olver – 01:56		First period	10:15 – Louis-Marc Aubry (PP); 19:01 – Louis-Marc Aubry
Matt White – 29:25		Second period	37:56 – Morgan Ellis
Leonhard Pföderl – 44:11		Third period	40:43 – Louis-Marc Aubry (PP)
Mathias Niederberger (24 saves / 28 shots)		Goalie stats	Michael Garteig (37 saves / 40 shots)

28 April 2021	ERC Ingolstadt	2–3	Eisbären Berlin	Saturn Arena, Ingolstadt	Recap
Tim Wohlgemuth – 00:57		First period	09:06 – Leonhard Pföderl
Mirko Höfflin – 26:48		Second period	No scoring
No scoring		Third period	49:18 – Matt White (PP); 58:57 – Ryan McKiernan
Michael Garteig (31 saves / 34 shots)		Goalie stats	Mathias Niederberger (19 saves / 21 shots)

30 April 2021	Eisbären Berlin	4–2	ERC Ingolstadt	Mercedes-Benz Arena, Berlin	Recap
No scoring		First period	No scoring
John Ramage – 30:58; Ryan McKiernan – 33:05		Second period	23:32 – Louis-Marc Aubry (PP2); 27:35 – Ryan Kuffner
Matt White – 49:42; Giovanni Fiore – 57:42		Third period	No scoring
Mathias Niederberger (46 saves / 48 shots)		Goalie stats	Michael Garteig (40 saves / 44 shots)

Berlin won series 2–1

==== Adler Mannheim vs Grizzlys Wolfsburg ====
26 April 2021	Adler Mannheim	4–1	Grizzlys Wolfsburg	SAP Arena, Mannheim	Recap
Andrew Desjardins (PP2) – 13:42		First period	No scoring
Ben Smith (PP) – 35:35		Second period	23:26 – Spencer Machacek (PP)
Felix Schütz – 53:57; Ben Smith (EN) – 58:19		Third period	No scoring
Dennis Endras (13 saves / 14 shots)		Goalie stats	Dustin Strahlmeier (31 saves / 35 shots)

28 April 2021	Grizzlys Wolfsburg	2–1	OT	Adler Mannheim	Eis Arena Wolfsburg, Wolfsburg	Recap
No scoring		First period		No scoring
No scoring		Second period		38:23 – Mark Katic
Sebastian Furchner (PP) – 46:53		Third period		No scoring
Anthony Rech – 65:05		First overtime period		No scoring
Dustin Strahlmeier (32 saves / 33 shots)		Goalie stats		Dennis Endras (17 saves / 19 shots)

30 April 2021	Adler Mannheim	1–2	Grizzlys Wolfsburg	SAP Arena, Mannheim	Recap
Denis Reul – 03:51		First period	13:52 – Spencer Machacek
No scoring		Second period	No scoring
No scoring		Third period	56:17 – Max Görtz
Dennis Endras (19 saves / 21 shots)		Goalie stats	Dustin Strahlmeier (23 saves / 24 shots)

Wolfsburg won series 2–1

=== Final ===
The final was played between 2 and 7 May 2021 in a best-of-three format.

2 May 2021	Eisbären Berlin	2–3	OT	Grizzlys Wolfsburg	Mercedes-Benz Arena, Berlin	Recap
No scoring		First period		No scoring
No scoring		Second period		33:04 – Gerrit Fauser (PP)
Marcel Noebels (PP) – 54:25; Zachary Boychuk (EA) – 59:22		Third period		57:42 – Garrett Festerling
No scoring		First overtime period		77:59 – Julian Melchiori
Mathias Niederberger (40 saves / 43 shots)		Goalie stats		Dustin Strahlmeier (41 saves / 43 shots)

5 May 2021	Grizzlys Wolfsburg	1–4	Eisbären Berlin	Eis Arena Wolfsburg, Wolfsburg	Recap
No scoring		First period	16:37 – Frank Hördler
Gerrit Fauser (PP) – 37:44		Second period	27:13 – Ryan McKiernan; 30:54 – Sebastian Streu
No scoring		Third period	58:13 – Lukas Reichel (EN)
Dustin Strahlmeier (21 saves / 25 shots)		Goalie stats	Mathias Niederberger (26 saves / 27 shots)

7 May 2021	Eisbären Berlin	2–1	Grizzlys Wolfsburg	Mercedes-Benz Arena, Berlin	Recap
Mark Olver – 01:49		First period	02:14 – Mathis Olimb
Leonhard Pföderl – 23:19		Second period	No scoring
No scoring		Third period	No scoring
Mathias Niederberger (19 saves / 20 shots)		Goalie stats	Dustin Strahlmeier (27 saves / 29 shots)

Berlin won series 2–1

== Awards and statistics ==
=== Awards ===
The awards were announced on 2 May 2021.

Award	Player
Player of the year	(Germany) Marcel Noebels
Goaltender of the year	(Sweden) Joacim Eriksson
Defenceman of the year	(Germany) Marcel Brandt
Forward of the year	(Germany) Marcel Noebels
Rookie of the year	(Germany) Florian Elias
Coach of the year	(Germany) Thomas Popiesch
Finals MVP	(United States) Ryan McKiernan

=== Scoring leaders ===
List shows the top skaters sorted by points, then goals.

Player	Team	GP	G	A	Pts	+/−	PIM	POS
Joe Whitney	Iserlohn Roosters	37	21	24	45	0	22	F
Casey Bailey	Iserlohn Roosters	37	20	24	44	+3	56	F
Jason Akeson	Kölner Haie	38	12	32	44	+2	8	F
Chris Bourque	EHC Red Bull München	38	7	35	42	+23	26	F
Marcel Noebels	Eisbären Berlin	36	6	35	42	+17	12	F
Trevor Parkes	EHC Red Bull München	38	23	18	41	+22	16	F
Matt White	Eisbären Berlin	38	19	20	39	+15	10	F
Alexandre Grenier	Iserlohn Roosters	35	12	27	39	−1	12	F
Yasin Ehliz	EHC Red Bull München	38	19	19	38	+19	28	F
Jon Matsumoto	Kölner Haie	37	16	22	38	+7	22	F

=== Leading goaltenders ===
Only the top five goaltenders, based on save percentage, who have played at least 40% of their team's minutes, are included in this list.

Player	Team	TOI	GA	GAA	SA	Sv%	SO
Felix Brueckmann	Adler Mannheim	1096	28	1.53	437	93.6	4
Joacim Eriksson	Schwenninger Wild Wings	1812	74	2.45	1074	93.1	2
Tomáš Pöpperle	Fischtown Pinguins	743	29	2.34	382	92.4	0
Dustin Strahlmeier	Grizzlys Wolfsburg	1402	49	2.10	636	92.3	2
Mathias Niederberger	Eisbären Berlin	1609	57	2.13	735	92.2	5
