= 2021–22 DEL season =

- League: Deutsche Eishockey Liga
- Sport: Ice hockey
- Duration: 9 September 2021 – 4 May 2022
- Teams: 15

Regular season
- Season champions: Eisbären Berlin
- Season MVP: Riley Sheen
- Top scorer: Jason Akeson (68 points)

Finals
- Champions: Eisbären Berlin
- Runners-up: EHC Red Bull München
- Finals MVP: Frank Hördler

DEL seasons
- ← 2020–21 2022–23 →

The 2021–22 Deutsche Eishockey Liga season was the 28th season since the founding of the Deutsche Eishockey Liga. It started on 9 September 2021 and ended on 4 May 2022.

The season was contested by 15 teams, as the 2020–21 DEL2 champion SC Bietigheim Steelers received a license. In February 2022, the DEL announced that only one team would be relegated, after only the Löwen Frankfurt applied for a license.

== Teams ==
Teams of the 2021–22 DEL season

Team	City	Arena	Capacity
Augsburger Panther	Augsburg	Curt Frenzel Stadium	6,218
Eisbären Berlin	Berlin	Mercedes-Benz Arena	14,200
Bietigheim Steelers	Bietigheim-Bissingen	EgeTrans Arena	4,500
Fischtown Pinguins	Bremerhaven	Eisarena Bremerhaven	4,674
Düsseldorfer EG	Düsseldorf	ISS Dome	13,400
ERC Ingolstadt	Ingolstadt	Saturn Arena	4,815
Iserlohn Roosters	Iserlohn	Eissporthalle Iserlohn	5,000
Kölner Haie	Cologne	Lanxess Arena	18,500
Krefeld Pinguine	Krefeld	König Palast	9,000
Adler Mannheim	Mannheim	SAP Arena	13,600
EHC Red Bull München	Munich	Olympia Eishalle	6,256
Nürnberg Ice Tigers	Nuremberg	Arena Nürnberger Versicherung	7,810
Schwenninger Wild Wings	Villingen-Schwenningen	Helios Arena	6,215
Straubing Tigers	Straubing	Eisstadion am Pulverturm	6,000
Grizzlys Wolfsburg	Wolfsburg	Eis Arena Wolfsburg	4,660

== Regular season ==
=== Standings ===
Pos	Team	Pld	W	OTW	OTL	L	GF	GA	GD	PCT	Qualification or relegation
1	Eisbären Berlin	55	34	1	8	12	194	139	+55	.679	Playoffs
2	EHC Red Bull München	56	28	6	10	12	196	140	+56	.631	Playoffs
3	Grizzlys Wolfsburg	56	27	9	5	15	166	139	+27	.619	Playoffs
4	Straubing Tigers	54	29	1	7	17	188	158	+30	.593	Playoffs
5	Adler Mannheim	54	24	10	1	19	165	129	+36	.574	Playoffs
6	Fischtown Pinguins	55	23	7	4	21	162	148	+14	.527	Playoffs
7	ERC Ingolstadt	55	21	5	10	19	176	158	+18	.503	Pre-playoffs
8	Nürnberg Ice Tigers	54	22	4	7	21	163	177	−14	.500	Pre-playoffs
9	Düsseldorfer EG	56	19	7	5	25	153	165	−12	.452	Pre-playoffs
10	Kölner Haie	56	15	11	7	23	155	175	−20	.440	Pre-playoffs
11	Augsburger Panther	52	16	4	11	21	137	169	−32	.429	
12	Iserlohn Roosters	54	15	7	8	24	159	177	−18	.414	
13	Bietigheim Steelers	56	16	8	4	28	155	207	−52	.405	
14	Schwenninger Wild Wings	55	15	6	6	28	135	164	−29	.382	
15	Krefeld Pinguine (R)	56	10	12	5	29	144	203	−59	.351	Relegated to DEL2

Source: DEL
Rules for classification: 1) points; 2) head-to-head points; 3) head-to-head goal difference; 4) head-to-head number of goals scored.
(R) Relegated

=== Results ===
Home \ Away	AUG	BER	BIE	BRE	DÜS	ING	ISE	KÖL	KRE	MAN	MUN	NÜR	SCH	STR	WOL	AUG	BER	BIE	BRE	DÜS	ING	ISE	KÖL	KRE	MAN	MUN	NÜR	SCH	STR	WOL
Augsburger Panther	—	2–4	3–1	4–3	1–0 (Note: Overtime)	2–1	1–4	4–5 (Note: Shootout)	3–2	— (Note: The games could not be played due to the COVID-19 pandemic.)	5–4	3–1	4–2	6–4	0–5	—	3–2	2–3	1–5	3–0	3–2	1–2	1–2	7–4	—	1–2	9–4	4–2	4–2	0–1
Eisbären Berlin	3–1	—	4–5	5–2	1–3	6–3	4–1	5–3	2–5	0–3	1–4	1–3	1–3	5–4	2–3	5–1	—	5–1	5–1	6–7	2–3	3–2	3–1	6–2	3–1	2–3	3–4	4–3	3–6	3–1
Bietigheim Steelers	2–4	2–4	—	3–10	5–2	5–4	3–2	4–3	1–4	2–4	6–3	1–2	2–3	2–6	0–4	4–0	4–5	—	0–2	4–3	3–2	2–4	1–9	1–2	5–4	1–9	5–4	5–2	1–3	0–4
Fischtown Pinguins	5–0	0–4	8–2	—	4–1	0–1	1–0	2–3	1–2	4–3	1–3	3–7	4–3	5–4	4–3	6–5	2–4	1–2	—	3–2	2–1	4–2	2–4	4–3	4–0	6–4	—	3–1	2–3	2–5
Düsseldorfer EG	5–3	4–7	4–1	5–2	—	3–2	2–4	1–2	3–4	2–5	1–2	3–1	2–1	3–2	3–2	3–4	3–2	0–3	6–1	—	3–0	3–2	2–1	4–1	1–4	0–6	5–4	2–3	4–3	2–3
ERC Ingolstadt	5–2	5–2	5–3	4–2	5–4	—	4–1	2–3	3–1	4–0	3–6	7–2	2–1	8–1	3–4	—	3–4	4–2	0–3	3–1	—	3–0	2–5	2–3	4–5	3–4	10–1	7–0	3–4	3–5
Iserlohn Roosters	5–4	4–7	2–5	2–1	3–1	3–4	—	5–6	1–4	2–0	2–1	4–1	3–4	4–3	5–2	2–3	—	3–4	5–6	3–4	2–5	—	7–3	5–2	6–3	3–6	4–5	1–2	—	5–1
Kölner Haie	3–2	1–2	3–4	2–0	1–6	2–3	2–1	—	1–0	3–4	1–3	4–2	5–1	2–5	2–1	3–2	1–7	7–3	1–4	0–3	1–0	2–3	—	4–2	1–5	2–5	2–1	4–3	1–3	3–1
Krefeld Pinguine	3–1	1–3	3–4	3–4	4–6	4–5	4–3	0–6	—	2–3	2–3	2–3	3–5	1–5	2–5	5–4	1–5	2–5	6–4	6–3	1–6	1–7	3–1	—	3–2	3–2	3–2	3–2	0–5	1–5
Adler Mannheim	7–1	3–2	6–2	1–0	2–4	4–3	6–1	2–0	3–2	—	3–2	3–2	4–3	4–3	3–7	3–2	0–4	4–3	0–2	4–1	4–3	2–4	1–3	6–1	—	5–1	3–2	4–0	3–1	4–1
EHC Red Bull München	4–3	1–3	2–0	3–4	5–3	4–0	3–4	6–4	3–4	2–5	—	3–2	4–2	6–3	2–3	2–1	1–2	7–3	1–0	3–4	9–1	5–0	4–5	5–1	5–2	—	4–1	4–3	0–2	2–4
Nürnberg Ice Tigers	5–1	2–6	3–0	2–3	1–4	5–2	4–3	6–1	2–3	3–2	2–4	—	2–3	6–3	4–3	3–2	1–2	1–5	4–3	1–2	3–0	6–2	7–4	6–2	1–2	3–1	—	3–6	4–3	3–2
Schwenninger Wild Wings	3–0	0–4	4–1	3–4	3–1	2–4	2–4	3–2	1–3	1–4	1–2	8–3	—	3–5	1–0	—	2–3	3–5	2–3	5–2	2–5	4–3	5–2	2–3	1–0	3–2	4–5	—	5–2	1–2
Straubing Tigers	4–7	6–3	3–4	0–4	4–3	4–1	6–2	4–2	4–3	4–2	1–5	3–5	1–2	—	5–2	3–1	0–4	4–1	2–1	4–2	4–3	5–0	8–4	3–4	2–1	2–3	—	2–4	—	5–1
Grizzlys Wolfsburg	6–5	3–2	3–2	0–4	2–0	2–4	4–3	3–2	6–3	2–6	4–3	2–3	1–0	2–1	—	3–1	5–4	5–3	1–4	4–2	4–1	2–3	4–3	5–2	2–1	4–3	5–1	3–0	0–4	—

Source: DEL
Legend: Blue = home team win; Yellow = draw; Red = away team win.

== Playoffs ==
=== Bracket ===
First round
7	ERC Ingolstadt	0
10	Kölner Haie	2
8	Nürnberg Ice Tigers	1
9	Düsseldorfer EG	2

Quarterfinals
1	Eisbären Berlin	3
10	Kölner Haie	0
2	EHC Red Bull München	3
9	Düsseldorfer EG	1
3	Grizzlys Wolfsburg	3
6	Fischtown Pinguins	2
4	Straubing Tigers	1
5	Adler Mannheim	3

Semifinals
1	Eisbären Berlin	3
5	Adler Mannheim	2
(Pairings are re-seeded after the first and second round)
2	EHC Red Bull München	3
3	Grizzlys Wolfsburg	0

Finals
1	Eisbären Berlin	3
2	EHC Red Bull München	1

=== Pre-playoffs ===
The pre-playoffs were played between 5 and 8 April 2022 in a best-of-three mode.

==== ERC Ingolstadt vs Kölner Haie ====
5 April 2022	Kölner Haie	4–3	ERC Ingolstadt	Lanxess Arena	Recap
Maximilian Kammerer – 02:19		First period	05:25 – Tim McGauley
Moritz Müller (PP) – 27:53; Alexander Oblinger – 31:59		Second period	34:09 – Mirko Höfflin
Landon Ferraro – 51:11		Third period	55:00 – Jerome Flaake
Justin Pogge (21 saves / 24 shots)		Goalie stats	Kevin Reich (27 saves / 33 shots)

7 April 2022	ERC Ingolstadt	2–3	OT	Kölner Haie	Saturn Arena	Recap
Mirko Höfflin – 07:50; Brandon DeFazio (PP) – 10:05		First period		No scoring
No scoring		Second period		20:51 – Andreas Thuresson (PP); 21:27 – Jonas Holøs
No scoring		Third period		No scoring
No scoring		First overtime period		69:41 – Maury Edwards (PP2)
Daniel Taylor (24 saves / 27 shots)		Goalie stats		Justin Pogge (54 saves / 56 shots)

Köln won series 2–0

==== Nürnberg Ice Tigers vs Düsseldorfer EG ====
5 April 2022	Nürnberg Ice Tigers	2–3	Düsseldorfer EG	Arena Nürnberger Versicherung	Recap
No scoring		First period	02:12 – Kyle Cumiskey; 11:12 – Stephen MacAulay
Daniel Schmölz – 23:57; Marko Friedrich – 28:54		Second period	24:51 – Daniel Fischbuch (PP)
No scoring		Third period	No scoring
Niklas Treutle (27 saves / 30 shots)		Goalie stats	Mirko Pantkowski (35 saves / 37 shots)

7 April 2022	Düsseldorfer EG	5–6	OT	Nürnberg Ice Tigers	ISS Dome	Recap
Bernhard Ebner – 01:19; Daniel Fischbuch (PP) – 16:57; Jerry D'Amigo – 17:35		First period		No scoring
Tobias Eder – 31:45		Second period		29:39 – Dane Fox; 39:57 – Dane Fox
Alexander Barta – 51:28		Third period		47:21 – Daniel Schmölz (PP); 53:59 – Dane Fox (PP); 55:14 – Patrick Reimer
No scoring		First overtime period		67:35 – Gregor MacLeod
Mirko Pantkowski (30 saves / 36 shots)		Goalie stats		Niklas Treutle (17 saves / 22 shots)

8 April 2022	Nürnberg Ice Tigers	1–3	Düsseldorfer EG	Arena Nürnberger Versicherung	Recap
Marko Friedrich – 06:55		First period	05:29 – Alexander Barta (PP); 11:01 – Daniel Fischbuch
No scoring		Second period	31:53 – Brendan O'Donnell (PP)
No scoring		Third period	No scoring
Niklas Treutle (17 saves / 20 shots)		Goalie stats	Mirko Pantkowski (34 saves / 35 shots)

Düsseldorf won series 2–1

=== Quarterfinals ===
The quarterfinals were played between 10 and 18 April 2022 in a best-of-five mode.

==== Eisbären Berlin vs Kölner Haie ====
10 April 2022	Eisbären Berlin	2–1	Kölner Haie	Mercedes-Benz Arena	Recap
No scoring		First period	No scoring
Marcel Noebels – 20:27; Leonhard Pföderl – 30:07		Second period	No scoring
No scoring		Third period	53:50 – David McIntyre
Mathias Niederberger (32 saves / 33 shots)		Goalie stats	Justin Pogge (30 saves / 32 shots)

12 April 2022	Kölner Haie	1–5	Eisbären Berlin	Lanxess Arena	Recap
David McIntyre – 09:13		First period	00:33 – Leonhard Pföderl (PP); 18:56 – Jonas Müller
No scoring		Second period	25:10 – Dominik Bokk; 39:31 – Matt White
No scoring		Third period	43:03 – Jonas Müller
Justin Pogge (27 saves / 32 shots)		Goalie stats	Mathias Niederberger (28 saves / 29 shots)

14 April 2022	Eisbären Berlin	4–0	Kölner Haie	Mercedes-Benz Arena	Recap
Manuel Wiederer – 02:35		First period	No scoring
Zach Boychuk (PP) – 27:57		Second period	No scoring
Zach Boychuk – 44:59; Giovanni Fiore (EN) – 54:27		Third period	No scoring
Mathias Niederberger (24 saves / 24 shots)		Goalie stats	Justin Pogge (26 saves / 30 shots)

Berlin won series 3–0

==== EHC Red Bull München vs Düsseldorfer EG ====
10 April 2022	EHC Red Bull München	4–2	Düsseldorfer EG	Olympia Eishalle	Recap
Andrew O'Brien – 07:25		First period	17:24 – Jerry D'Amigo (SH)
Ben Smith – 27:55		Second period	27:15 – Luca Zitterbart
Zach Redmond – 51:23; Andrew O'Brien (EN) – 58:63		Third period	No scoring
Henrik Haukeland (25 saves / 27 shots)		Goalie stats	Mirko Pantkowski (35 saves / 39 shots)

12 April 2022	Düsseldorfer EG	3–2	EHC Red Bull München	ISS Dome	Recap
No scoring		First period	No scoring
Alexander Barta – 22:57; Stephen MacAulay – 33:58; Alexander Barta (PP) – 38:55		Second period	28:19 – Philip Gogulla
No scoring		Third period	53:09 – Zach Redmond
Mirko Pantkowski (32 saves / 34 shots)		Goalie stats	Henrik Haukeland (21 saves / 24 shots)

14 April 2022	EHC Red Bull München	3–1	Düsseldorfer EG	Olympia Eishalle	Recap
Patrick Hager – 17:40		First period	04:56 – Bernhard Ebner
Yasin Ehliz – 23:43		Second period	No scoring
No scoring		Third period	No scoring
Henrik Haukeland (19 saves / 20 shots)		Goalie stats	Mirko Pantkowski (34 saves / 37 shots)

16 April 2022	Düsseldorfer EG	2–4	EHC Red Bull München	ISS Dome	Recap
Alexander Ehl – 09:15		First period	03:49 – Yasin Ehliz; 17:57 – Zach Redmond
No scoring		Second period	No scoring
Alexander Ehl – 43:04		Third period	43:30 – Philip Gogulla; 59:48 – Ben Smith
Mirko Pantkowski (20 saves / 24 shots)		Goalie stats	Henrik Haukeland (33 saves / 35 shots)

Munich won series 3–1

==== Grizzlys Wolfsburg vs Fischtown Pinguins ====
10 April 2022	Grizzlys Wolfsburg	5–0	Fischtown Pinguins	Eis Arena Wolfsburg	Recap
Chris DeSousa – 09:00; Björn Krupp – 10:27		First period	No scoring
Trevor Mingoia – 26:08		Second period	No scoring
Trevor Mingoia – 46:37; Darren Archibald (PP) – 51:28		Third period	No scoring
Dustin Strahlmeier (32 saves / 32 shots)		Goalie stats	Maximilian Franzreb (20 saves / 25 shots)

12 April 2022	Fischtown Pinguins	2–6	Grizzlys Wolfsburg	Eisarena Bremerhaven	Recap
Ross Mauermann – 11:19		First period	09:51 – Anthony Rech
No scoring		Second period	33:12 – Chris DeSousa (PP); 36:10 – Julian Melchiori (PP3); 38:53 – Darren Archibald
Alex Friesen – 51:54		Third period	40:55 – Tyler Gaudet; 44:23 – Dominik Bittner
Brandon Maxwell (38 saves / 44 shots)		Goalie stats	Dustin Strahlmeier (22 saves / 24 shots)

14 April 2022	Grizzlys Wolfsburg	1–3	Fischtown Pinguins	Eis Arena Wolfsburg	Recap
Darren Archibald – 11:41		First period	03:13 – Niklas Andersen (PP)
No scoring		Second period	21:05 – Alex Friesen
No scoring		Third period	45:43 – Jan Urbas
Dustin Strahlmeier (18 saves / 21 shots)		Goalie stats	Maximilian Franzreb (34 saves / 35 shots)

16 April 2022	Fischtown Pinguins	3–2	2OT	Grizzlys Wolfsburg	Eisarena Bremerhaven	Recap
Dominik Uher – 00:18; Miha Verlič – 03:44		First period		06:45 – Darren Archibald
No scoring		Second period		36:11 – Gerrit Fauser
No scoring		Third period		No scoring
Phillip Bruggisser – 91:31		Second overtime period		No scoring
Maximilian Franzreb (42 saves / 44 shots)		Goalie stats		Dustin Strahlmeier (29 saves / 32 shots)

18 April 2022	Grizzlys Wolfsburg	2–0	Fischtown Pinguins	Eis Arena Wolfsburg	Recap
Tyler Gaudet – 05:12		First period	No scoring
No scoring		Second period	No scoring
Spencer Machacek (EN) – 58:08		Third period	No scoring
Dustin Strahlmeier (28 saves / 28 shots)		Goalie stats	Maximilian Franzreb (25 saves / 27 shots)

Wolfsburg won series 3–2

==== Straubing Tigers vs Adler Mannheim ====
10 April 2022	Straubing Tigers	2–3	Adler Mannheim	Eisstadion am Pulverturm	Recap
Kael Mouillierat – 08:49		First period	11:07 – Jordan Szwarz (PP)
No scoring		Second period	20:33 – Andrew Desjardins
Travis St. Denis (EA) – 59:19		Third period	58:44 – Jordan Szwarz (EN)
Tyler Parks (21 saves / 24 shots)		Goalie stats	Felix Brückmann (25 saves / 27 shots)

12 April 2022	Adler Mannheim	2–1	OT	Straubing Tigers	SAP Arena	Recap
No scoring		First period		No scoring
Jordan Szwarz – 33:51		Second period		24:36 – Taylor Leier (PP)
No scoring		Third period		No scoring
Nico Krämmer – 67:30		First overtime period		No scoring
Felix Brückmann (26 saves / 27 shots)		Goalie stats		Tyler Parks (25 saves / 27 shots)

14 April 2022	Straubing Tigers	4–1	Adler Mannheim	Eisstadion am Pulverturm	Recap
No scoring		First period	No scoring
Taylor Leier (PP) – 20:45; Kael Mouillierat – 21:30; Jason Akeson (PP) – 22:46		Second period	26:31 – Borna Rendulić
Mike Connolly (EN) – 58:38		Third period	No scoring
Tyler Parks (30 saves / 31 shots)		Goalie stats	Felix Brückmann (19 saves / 23 shots)

16 April 2022	Adler Mannheim	8–3	Straubing Tigers	SAP Arena	Recap
Tim Wohlgemuth – 11:46; Nico Krämmer (PP) – 16:06		First period	No scoring
Matthias Plachta – 24:30; Andrew Desjardins – 27:30; Matthias Plachta – 27:53		Second period	28:36 – David Elsner
David Wolf (PP, EA) – 42:23; Jason Bast – 47:10; Tim Wohlgemuth – 51:05		Third period	53:20 – Mario Zimmermann; 55:50 – Travis St. Denis
Felix Brückmann (28 saves / 31 shots)		Goalie stats	Tyler Parks (17 saves / 25 shots)

Mannheim won series 3–1

=== Semifinals ===
The semifinals were played between 20 and 28 April 2022 in a best-of-five mode.

==== Eisbären Berlin vs Adler Mannheim ====
20 April 2022	Eisbären Berlin	4–3	OT	Adler Mannheim	Mercedes-Benz Arena	Recap
Giovanni Fiore – 07:16; Jonas Müller – 11:15		First period		17:27 – Andrew Desjardins (PP2)
Yannick Veilleux – 33:17		Second period		22:49 – Jason Bast
No scoring		Third period		46:54 – Tim Wohlgemuth
Manuel Wiederer – 71:36		First overtime period		No scoring
Mathias Niederberger (28 saves / 31 shots)		Goalie stats		Felix Brückmann (42 saves / 46 shots)

22 April 2022	Adler Mannheim	3–6	Eisbären Berlin	SAP Arena	Recap
Jordan Szwarz – 13:47		First period	No scoring
Florian Elias – 36:14		Second period	27:45 – Manuel Wiederer
Tim Wohlgemuth – 57:05		Third period	47:45 – Blaine Byron (PP); 54:17 – Leonhard Pföderl; 54:34 – Zach Boychuk; 56:26 – Blaine Byron (EN); 58:37 – Zach Boychuk (EN)
Felix Brückmann (17 saves / 20 shots)		Goalie stats	Mathias Niederberger (23 saves / 29 shots)

24 April 2022	Eisbären Berlin	3–5	Adler Mannheim	Mercedes-Benz Arena	Recap
Frans Nielsen (PP) – 06:40		First period	03:19 – Markus Hännikäinen
No scoring		Second period	30:47 – Nigel Dawes
Blaine Byron (PP, EA) – 57:19; Johan Södergran – 59:38		Third period	46:23 – Nico Krämmer; 50:09 – Nigel Dawes (PP); 59:10 – Nigel Dawes (EN)
Mathias Niederberger (24 saves / 29 shots)		Goalie stats	Felix Brückmann (28 saves / 31 shots)

26 April 2022	Adler Mannheim	4–3	Eisbären Berlin	SAP Arena	Recap
Matthias Plachta – 05:29		First period	18:41 – Zach Boychuk
Borna Rendulić (PS, EA) – 36:32; Nigel Dawes – 38:51		Second period	34:48 – Kevin Clark (PP); 39:46 – Kai Wissmann
Markus Eisenschmid – 52:45		Third period	No scoring
Felix Brückmann (32 saves / 35 shots)		Goalie stats	Mathias Niederberger (23 saves / 27 shots)

28 April 2022	Eisbären Berlin	3–0	Adler Mannheim	Mercedes-Benz Arena	Recap
No scoring		First period	No scoring
Manuel Wiederer – 20:43		Second period	No scoring
Blaine Byron – 45:15; Blaine Byron (EN) – 59:14		Third period	No scoring
Mathias Niederberger (26 saves / 26 shots)		Goalie stats	Felix Brückmann (23 saves / 26 shots)

Berlin won series 3–2

==== EHC Red Bull München vs Grizzlys Wolfsburg ====
20 April 2022	EHC Red Bull München	5–1	Grizzlys Wolfsburg	Olympia Eishalle	Recap
Patrick Hager – 12:05; Ben Street – 16:46		First period	No scoring
Patrick Hager (PP) – 22:53; Konrad Abeltshauser – 35:17		Second period	No scoring
Ben Smith (PP) – 41:21		Third period	52:31 – Jordan Murray (PP2)
Henrik Haukeland (21 saves / 22 shots)		Goalie stats	Dustin Strahlmeier (28 saves / 33 shots)

22 April 2022	Grizzlys Wolfsburg	2–3	EHC Red Bull München	Eis Arena Wolfsburg	Recap
Anthony Rech – 06:31; Phil Hungerecker – 07:46		First period	15:08 – Austin Ortega
No scoring		Second period	24:59 – Ben Smith; 35:09 – Maximilian Kastner
No scoring		Third period	No scoring
Dustin Strahlmeier (26 saves / 29 shots)		Goalie stats	Henrik Haukeland (30 saves / 32 shots)

24 April 2022	EHC Red Bull München	2–0	Grizzlys Wolfsburg	Olympia Eishalle	Recap
Yasin Ehliz – 05:16; Austin Ortega – 05:30		First period	No scoring
No scoring		Second period	No scoring
No scoring		Third period	No scoring
Henrik Haukeland (17 saves / 17 shots)		Goalie stats	Dustin Strahlmeier (18 saves / 20 shots)

Munich won series 3–0

=== Final ===
The final was played between 30 April and 4 May 2022 in a best-of-five mode.

29 April 2022	Eisbären Berlin	3–4	EHC Red Bull München	Mercedes-Benz Arena	Recap
Kevin Clark – 11:29; Zach Boychuk (PP) – 14:34		First period	No scoring
Leonhard Pföderl – 20:43		Second period	29:02 – Patrick Hager (PP); 31:48 – Patrick Hager; 34:01 – Ben Smith
No scoring		Third period	54:38 – Zach Redmond
Mathias Niederberger (34 saves / 38 shots)		Goalie stats	Henrik Haukeland (27 saves / 30 shots)

1 May 2022	EHC Red Bull München	2–3	2OT	Eisbären Berlin	Olympia Eishalle	Recap
Trevor Parkes – 12:02		First period		12:37 – Leonhard Pföderl
No scoring		Second period		No scoring
Trevor Parkes (EA) – 57:47		Third period		40:53 – Frans Nielsen
No scoring		Second overtime period		83:37 – Frans Nielsen
Henrik Haukeland (46 saves / 49 shots)		Goalie stats		Mathias Niederberger (27 saves / 29 shots)

2 May 2022	Eisbären Berlin	2–1	EHC Red Bull München	Mercedes-Benz Arena	Recap
Zach Boychuk (PP) – 04:08		First period	06:33 – Zach Redmond
Dominik Bokk – 38:27		Second period	No scoring
No scoring		Third period	No scoring
Mathias Niederberger (39 saves / 40 shots)		Goalie stats	Henrik Haukeland (28 saves / 30 shots)

4 May 2022	EHC Red Bull München	0–5	Eisbären Berlin	Olympia Eishalle	Recap
No scoring		First period	08:41 – Matt White
No scoring		Second period	24:52 – Frans Nielsen; 25:43 – Marcel Noebels; 36:34 – Matt White (PP)
No scoring		Third period	59:50 – Matt White (EN)
Henrik Haukeland (18 saves / 23 shots)		Goalie stats	Mathias Niederberger (32 saves / 32 shots)

Berlin won series 3–1

== Statistics ==
=== Scoring leaders ===
List shows the top skaters sorted by points, then goals.

Player	Team	GP	G	A	Pts	+/−	PIM	POS
Jason Akeson	Straubing Tigers	52	22	44	68	+10	10	F
Riley Sheen	Bietigheim Steelers	55	40	24	64	−4	8	F
Matt White	Eisbären Berlin	54	28	31	59	+25	10	F
Žiga Jeglič	Fischtown Pinguins	55	15	42	57	+14	40	F
Marcel Noebels	Eisbären Berlin	50	20	36	56	+20	14	F
Jan Urbas	Fischtown Pinguins	55	25	30	55	+15	37	F
Jeremy Bracco	Krefeld Pinguine	54	14	40	54	−14	6	F
Chris DeSousa	Grizzlys Wolfsburg	50	26	27	53	+11	43	F
Brendan O'Donnell	Düsseldorfer EG	56	22	31	53	−7	10	F
Mike Connolly	Straubing Tigers	53	19	34	53	+5	38	F

=== Leading goaltenders ===
Only the top five goaltenders, based on save percentage, who have played at least 40% of their team's minutes, are included in this list.

Player	Team	TOI	GA	GAA	SA	Sv%	SO
Henrik Haukeland	EHC Red Bull München	1109	26	1.41	471	94.5	2
Maximilian Franzreb	Fischtown Pinguins	1137	34	1.79	576	94.1	4
Mathias Niederberger	Eisbären Berlin	2228	73	1.97	1064	93.1	2
Dustin Strahlmeier	Grizzlys Wolfsburg	2431	84	2.07	1198	93.0	6
Tyler Parks	Straubing Tigers	732	25	2.05	351	92.9	2

== Awards ==
The awards were announced on 11 April 2022.

Award	Player
Player of the year	(Canada) Riley Sheen
Goaltender of the year	(Germany) Dustin Strahlmeier
Defenceman of the year	(United States) Zach Redmond
Forward of the year	(Canada) Riley Sheen
Rookie of the year	(Germany) Philipp Dietl
Coach of the year	(Canada) Serge Aubin
Finals MVP	(Germany) Frank Hördler
