= Tyler Gaudet =

Canadian ice hockey player (born 1993)

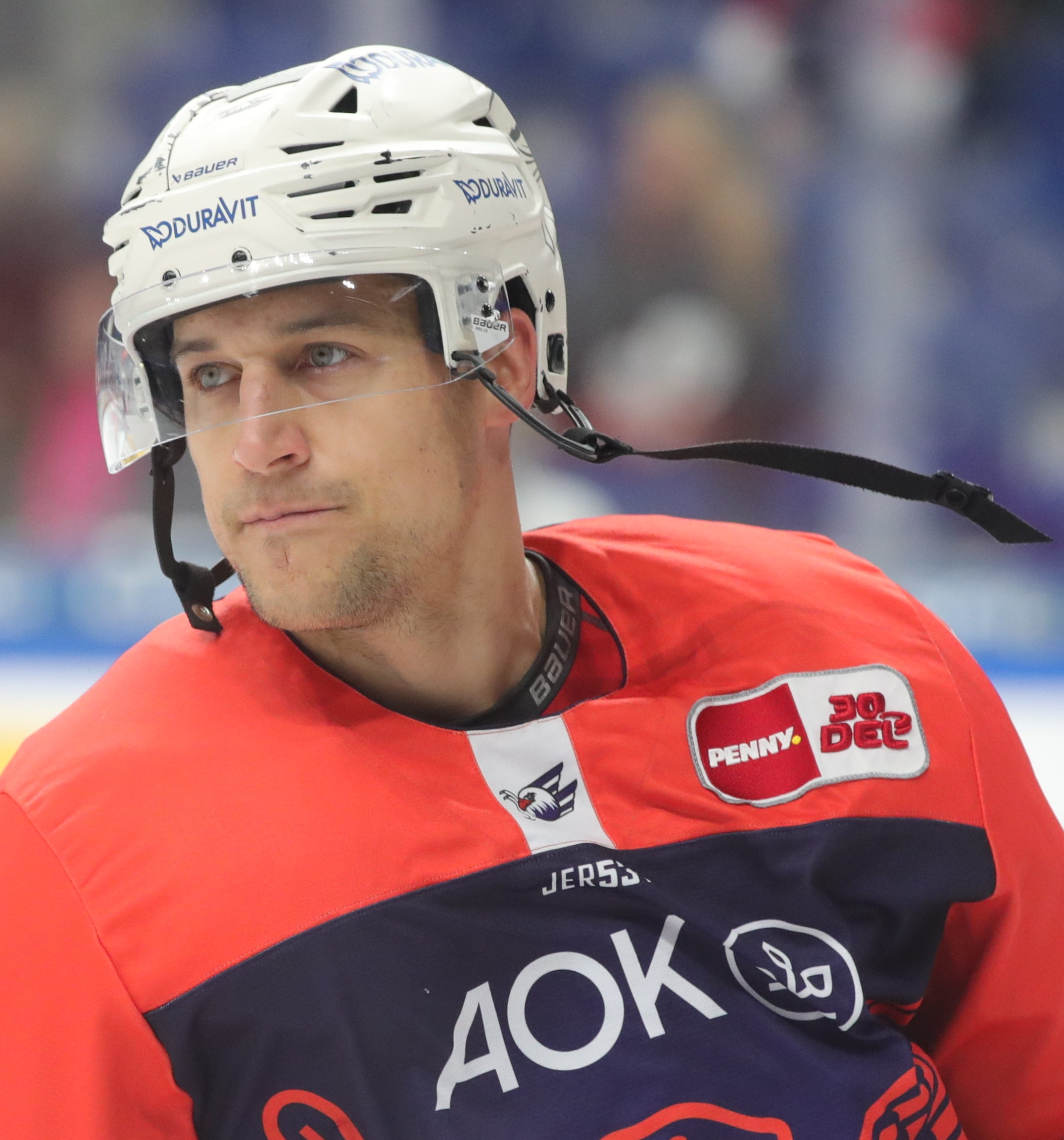
- Gaudet with the Adler Mannheim in 2023
- Born: April 4, 1993 (age 33) Hamilton, Ontario, Canada
- Height: 6 ft 3 in (191 cm)
- Weight: 201 lb (91 kg; 14 st 5 lb)
- Position: Centre
- Shoots: Left
- DEL team Former teams: Grizzlys Wolfsburg; Arizona Coyotes; Adler Mannheim; Düsseldorfer EG
- NHL draft: Undrafted
- Playing career: 2014–present

Tyler Gaudet (born April 4, 1993) is a Canadian professional ice hockey player who is currently under contract with Grizzlys Wolfsburg of the Deutsche Eishockey Liga (DEL). He has previously played with the Arizona Coyotes in the National Hockey League (NHL).

== Playing career ==
=== Amateur ===
As a youth, Gaudet played in the 2006 Quebec International Pee-Wee Hockey Tournament with a minor ice hockey team from Hamilton, Ontario.

Gaudet started the 2010–11 season with the Gatineau Olympiques in the Quebec Major Junior Hockey League. However, after only recording five points in 32 games, he was reassigned to the Pembroke Lumber Kings.

In his second year with the Pembroke Lumber Kings, Gaudet was encouraged by coach Sheldon Keefe to tryout for the Sault Ste. Marie Greyhounds of the Ontario Hockey League. Gaudet later signed a major junior hockey contract with the Greyhounds as a free agent.

On November 4, 2013, while playing with the Greyhounds, the Phoenix Coyotes signed Gaudet as an undrafted free agent to a three-year entry-level contract. After completing the 2013–14 season with the Greyhounds, Gaudet joined the Coyotes American Hockey League (AHL) affiliate, the Portland Pirates, to conclude the season.

=== Professional ===
After being cut from the Coyotes training camp, Gaudet began the 2014–15 season in the AHL. He eventually made his NHL debut on December 30, 2014, in a 4–2 loss to the Philadelphia Flyers. On January 2, 2015, Gaudet was reassigned to the Portland Pirates.

After being cut from the Coyotes training camp, Gaudet began the 2015–16 season with the Portland Pirates in the AHL. On February 9, 2016, Gaudet was recalled from the AHL. Gaudet scored his first NHL goal against Dallas Stars goaltender Antti Niemi on February 18, 2016, in a 6–3 Coyotes win.

In the 2017–18 season, on February 26, 2018, the Coyotes traded Gaudet along with John Ramage to the Nashville Predators in exchange for Pierre-Cédric Labrie and Trevor Murphy. He was assigned to AHL affiliate, the Milwaukee Admirals and played out the remainder of the campaign in adding 2 goals and 6 points in 21 games. On April 16, 2018, Gaudet agreed to a one-year, two-way contract extension to remain with the Predators.

On July 24, 2019 the Toronto Maple Leafs signed Gaudet to a one-year, two-way deal worth $700,000. He was assigned by the Maple Leafs to the AHL, joining the Toronto Marlies for the 2019–20 season. As an alternate captain, Gaudet contributed with 17 assists and 21 points in 58 games with the Marlies.

As a free agent from the Maple Leafs, Guadet opted to continue his career with the Marlies, signing a one-year AHL contract on October 16, 2020.

Entering his 9 professional season, Gaudet left North America as a free agent and signed a one-year contract in Germany with Grizzlys Wolfsburg of the DEL on August 30, 2021. In the following 2021-22 season, Gaudet contributed with 17 goals and 17 assists for 34 points through 33 games.

Continuing in the DEL, Gaudet as a free agent opted to move to fellow German club, Adler Mannheim, on May 10, 2022.

== Career statistics ==
			Regular season					Playoffs
Season	Team	League	GP	G	A	Pts	PIM	GP	G	A	Pts	PIM
2010–11	Hamilton Red Wings	OJHL	41	4	15	19	14	7	3	3	6	6
2011–12	Gatineau Olympiques	QMJHL	38	3	2	5	25	—	—	—	—	—
2011–12	Pembroke Lumber Kings	CCHL	22	4	12	16	6	11	0	3	3	2
2012–13	Pembroke Lumber Kings	CCHL	25	10	12	22	6	—	—	—	—	—
2012–13	Sault Ste. Marie Greyhounds	OHL	34	3	5	8	10	6	1	0	1	10
2013–14	Sault Ste. Marie Greyhounds	OHL	65	26	35	61	35	9	2	6	8	0
2013–14	Portland Pirates	AHL	2	0	0	0	0	—	—	—	—	—
2014–15	Portland Pirates	AHL	71	8	12	20	22	4	1	1	2	0
2014–15	Arizona Coyotes	NHL	2	0	0	0	0	—	—	—	—	—
2015–16	Springfield Falcons	AHL	44	4	9	13	23	—	—	—	—	—
2015–16	Arizona Coyotes	NHL	14	1	2	3	0	—	—	—	—	—
2016–17	Tucson Roadrunners	AHL	62	6	16	22	36	—	—	—	—	—
2016–17	Arizona Coyotes	NHL	4	0	1	1	0	—	—	—	—	—
2017–18	Tucson Roadrunners	AHL	48	11	11	22	34	—	—	—	—	—
2017–18	Milwaukee Admirals	AHL	21	2	4	6	6	—	—	—	—	—
2018–19	Milwaukee Admirals	AHL	50	8	17	25	34	4	0	2	2	4
2019–20	Toronto Marlies	AHL	58	4	17	21	38	—	—	—	—	—
2020–21	Toronto Marlies	AHL	34	11	12	23	22	—	—	—	—	—
2021–22	Grizzlys Wolfsburg	DEL	33	17	17	34	17	8	2	3	5	8
2022–23	Adler Mannheim	DEL	21	6	10	16	2	12	1	7	8	9
2023–24	Adler Mannheim	DEL	51	10	13	23	22	7	1	3	4	6
2024–25	Düsseldorfer EG	DEL	35	18	18	36	16	—	—	—	—	—
2025–26	Grizzlys Wolfsburg	DEL	52	14	29	43	31	3	0	0	0	2
NHL totals			20	1	3	4	0	—	—	—	—	—
