= Fischtown Pinguins =

- City: Bremerhaven
- League: DEL
- Founded: 1974
- Home arena: Eisarena Bremerhaven (capacity: 4,674)
- Colours: Black, red, white
- General manager: Hauke Hasselbring
- Head coach: Alexander Sulzer
- Captain: Jan Urbas
- Website: fischtown-pinguins.de

Franchise history
- 1974–1983: RSC Bremerhaven
- 1983–1987: EHC Bremerhaven
- 1983–2002: REV Bremerhaven
- 2002–present: Fischtown Pinguins

The Fischtown Pinguins, also known as REV Bremerhaven, are a professional ice hockey team based in Bremerhaven, Germany. From 2004 to 2016 the team played at the second tier of ice hockey in Germany, known as the 2nd Bundesliga until the 2012–13 season and, from the 2013–14 season onward, as the DEL2. On 1 July 2016 the team was granted a DEL licence for the 2016–17 season to replace the Hamburg Freezers which had withdrawn from the league.

The team plays in the Eisarena Bremerhaven.

== Season records ==
Season	Games	Won	OTW	SOW	OTL	SOL	Lost	Points	Goals for	Goals against	Rank	Playoffs
2nd Bundesliga 2007–08	52	20	2	0	2	0	28	66	148	164	12	No playoffs/ Relegation
Abstiegsrunde 2007–08; Relegation Round	Defeated Lausitzer Füchse 4 games to 3											Saved
2nd Bundesliga 2008–09	48	19	0	2	3	0	24	64	144	157	10	Lost in quarterfinals
2nd Bundesliga 2009–10	52	14	3	3	3	2	27	59	139	165	11	No playoffs/ Relegation
Abstiegsrunde 2009–10; Relegation Round	Defeated Wölfe Freiburg 4 games to 1											Saved
2nd Bundesliga 2010–11	48	25	4	0	4	3	12	90	183	127	3	Lost in quarterfinals
2nd Bundesliga 2011–12	48	18	2	4	2	1	21	69	161	161	9	No playoffs/ Relegation
Abstiegsrunde 2011–12; Relegation Round	8	1	1	—	2	—	4	7	13	23	5	Saved

== Players ==
Updated 11 April 2025.

No.	Nat	Player	Pos	S/G	Age	Acquired	Birthplace
42	(Canada)	Matthew Abt	D	L	32	2024	Leduc, Alberta, Canada
33	(Slovakia)	Július Hudáček	G	R	37	2025	Levoca, Slovakia
15	(Poland)	Rayan Bettahar	D	L	22	2024	Nowy Targ, Poland
72	(Denmark)	Phillip Bruggisser	D	R	34	2021	Rødovre, Denmark
76	(Germany)	Justin Büsing	F	L	22	2023	Bremerhaven, Germany
17	(Sweden)	Ludwig Byström	D	L	31	2025	Örnsköldsvik, Sweden
79	(Canada)	Colt Conrad	C	R	29	2023	Brandon, Manitoba, Canada
22	(Czech Republic)	Vladimír Eminger	D	R	34	2020	Most, Czech Republic
27	(Germany)	Leon Hungerecker	G	L	28	2025	Lüneburg, Germany
57	(Canada)	Alex Friesen (A)	C	L	35	2018	St. Catharines, Ontario, Canada
34	(Germany)	Christopher Strasen	G	L	24	2025	Bremerhaven, Germany
30	(Latvia)	Kristers Gudļevskis	G	L	33	2023	Aizkraukle, Latvia
23	(Sweden)	Max Görtz	RW	R	33	2024	Höör, Sweden
25	(Germany)	Fabian Herrmann	F	L	24	2024	Regensburg, Germany
13	(Slovenia)	Žiga Jeglič	W	R	38	2020	Kranj, Slovenia
48	(Denmark)	Nicholas Jensen	D	L	37	2022	Copenhagen, Denmark
51	(United States)	Andy Miele	C	L	38	2025	Grosse Pointe Woods, Michigan, United States
8	(Germany)	Nino Kinder	LW	L	25	2021	Berlin, Germany
21	(Germany)	Nico Krämmer	W	L	33	2025	Landshut, Germany
53	(Germany)	Maxim Rausch	D	L	23	2024	Miass, Russia
73	(Germany)	Bennet Roßmy	LW	L	22	2025	Zittau, Germany
14	(United States)	Ross Mauermann	W	L	35	2016	Janesville, Wisconsin, United States
19	(United States)	C.J. Smith	LW	L	31	2025	Des Moines, Iowa, United States
2	(Canada)	Akito Hirose	D	L	27	2025	Calgary, Alberta, Canada
9	(Slovenia)	Jan Urbas (C)	C	L	37	2017	Ljubljana, Slovenia
91	(Slovenia)	Miha Verlič	LW	L	34	2018	Maribor, Slovenia
65	(Denmark)	Christian Wejse	C	R	27	2021	Esbjerg, Denmark
