= Jason Akeson =

Canadian ice hockey player (born 1990)

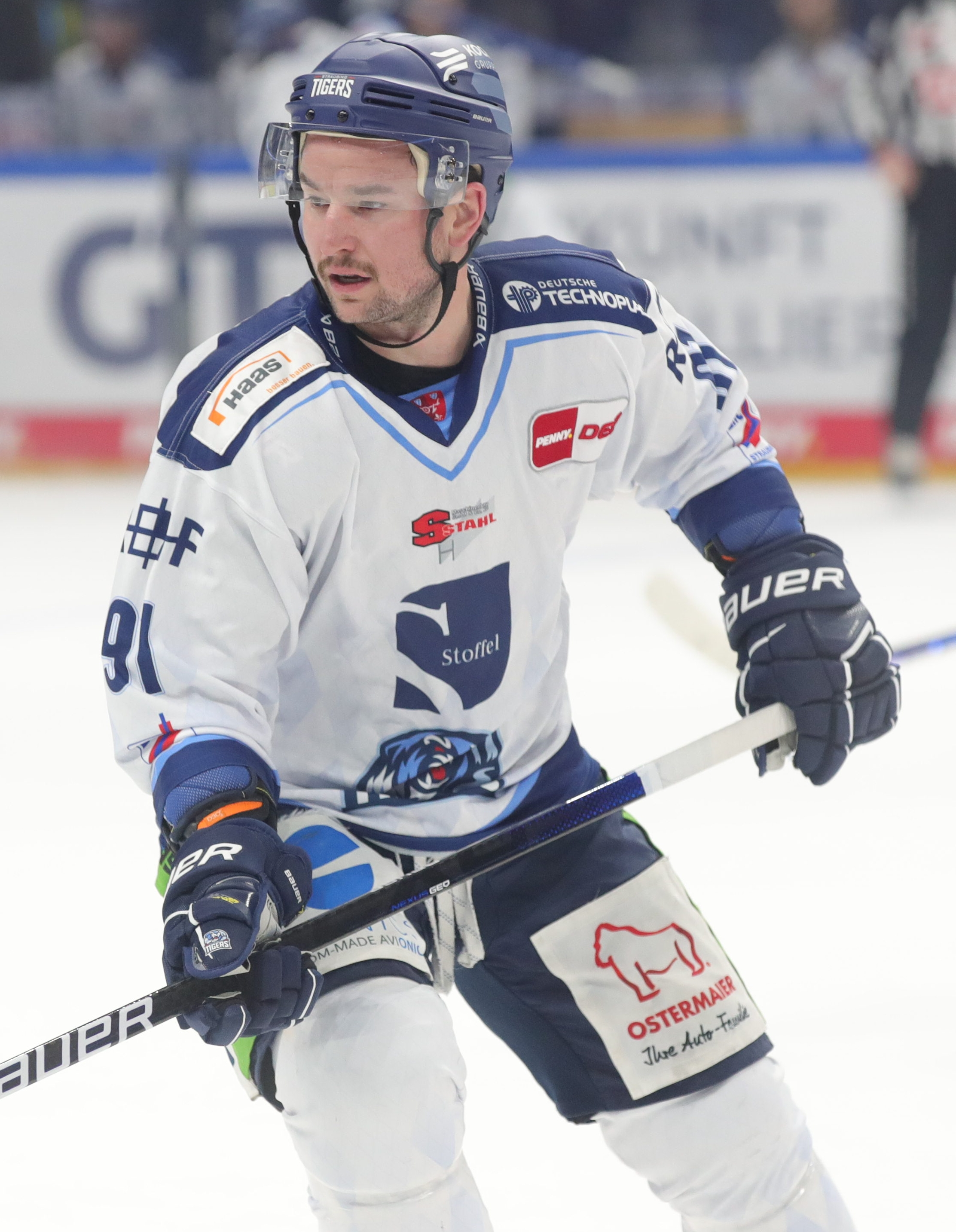
- Akeson with the Straubing Tigers in 2022
- Born: June 3, 1990 (age 36) Orleans, Ontario, Canada
- Height: 5 ft 10 in (178 cm)
- Weight: 185 lb (84 kg; 13 st 3 lb)
- Position: Right wing
- Shoots: Right
- NL team Former teams: Genève-Servette HC; Philadelphia Flyers; Admiral Vladivostok; Mora IK; Kölner Haie; Straubing Tigers; HC Pustertal Wölfe
- NHL draft: Undrafted
- Playing career: 2011–present

Jason Akeson (born June 3, 1990) is a Canadian professional ice hockey right winger for Genève-Servette HC of the National League (NL). He played 15 games in the National Hockey League (NHL) with the Philadelphia Flyers between 2013 and 2015.

== Playing career ==
As a youth, Akeson played in the 2003 Quebec International Pee-Wee Hockey Tournament with a minor ice hockey team from Cumberland, Ontario.

=== Junior ===
Akeson played junior hockey for the Cumberland Grads of the CJHL from 2006 to 2008. He had a total of 114 points in 88 games for them. In 2007-08 Akeson played 13 games for the Kitchener Rangers of the Ontario Hockey League. He had a total of 2 points (assists). Akeson returned to the Rangers in 2008-09 to play in his first full OHL season. Although the Rangers finished last in the Central Division, Akeson still had a successful season scoring 64 points in 56 games. He was named to the league's Second All-Rookie team.

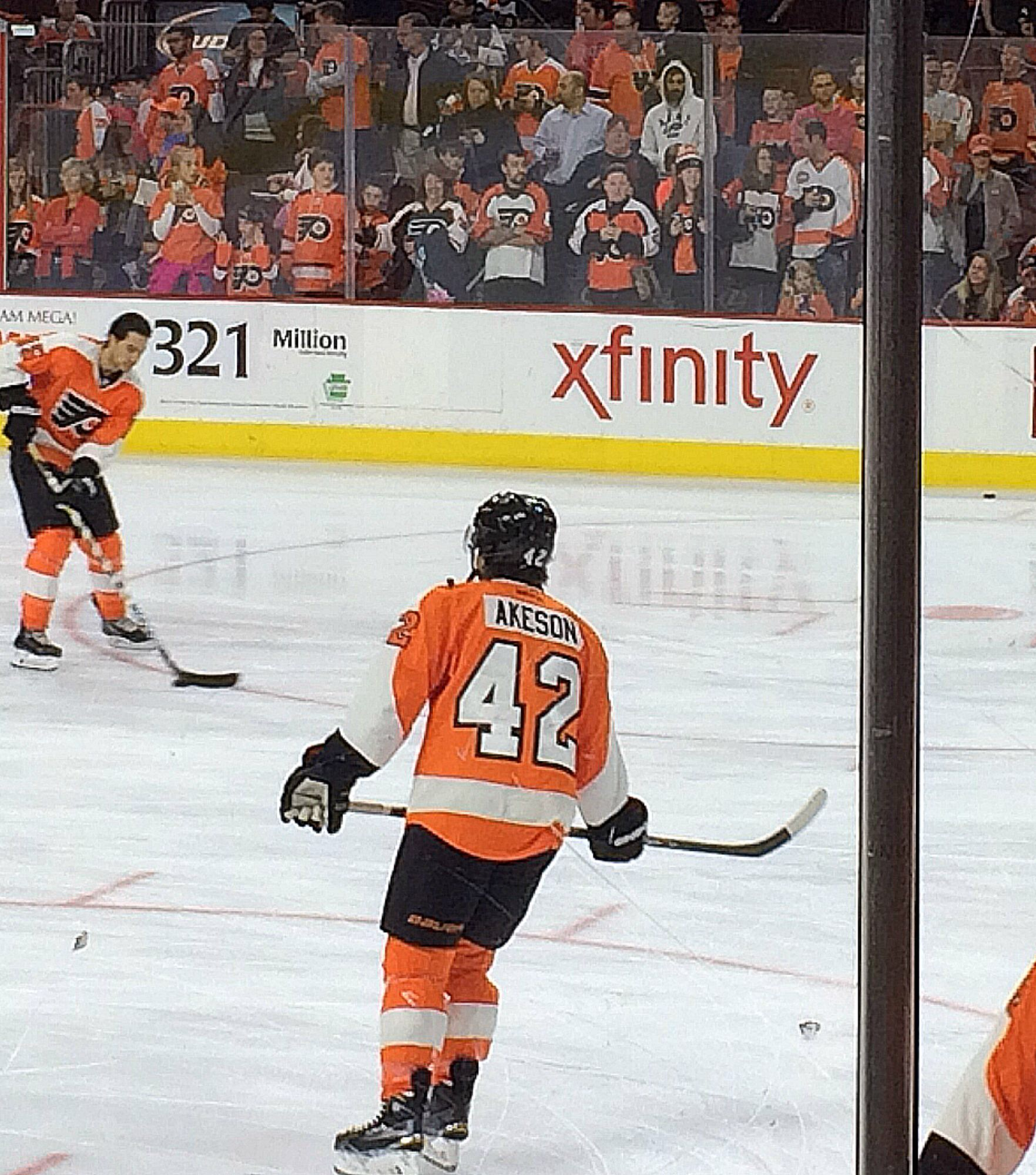
Akeson during his tenure with the Flyers.

In the 2009–10 season Akeson had 80 points while playing on a line with Jeff Skinner and Jeremy Morin in 56 regular season games. He scored an additional 19 points in 20 playoff games. In 2010-11 Akeson tied for first overall in points with Tyler Toffoli with 108 points. He was first overall in the league in assists, with 84. Akeson was named the league's Most Gentlemanly Player, recording only 23 penalty minutes. He was also awarded the OHL's Leo Lalonde Memorial Trophy as the league's top over age player.

=== Professional ===
Akeson was signed by the Philadelphia Flyers to a three-year entry-level contract on March 2, 2011. He spent most of his first two professional seasons with the Adirondack Phantoms of the American Hockey League, leading the team in point scoring both seasons. He made his NHL debut on April 27, 2013 in the Flyers season finale against the Ottawa Senators (of the rookie's hometown) in which he also banked his first NHL goal on netminder Craig Anderson, which was also his first NHL career shot. He spent the 2013–14 regular season with Adirondack, but was called up for the Flyers' final regular season game. He was then added to the postseason roster, where he netted two goals in a seven-game first round loss to the New York Rangers.

On July 1, 2015, Akeson signed a one-year, two-way contract with the Buffalo Sabres. He began the 2015–16 season with affiliate, the Rochester Americans. After 52 games with the Americans, he was traded by the Sabres in a seven player deal to the Ottawa Senators on February 27, 2016. He was immediately reassigned to AHL affiliate, the Binghamton Senators for the remainders of the year.

As a free agent from the Senators, Akeson opted to continue his career abroad, agreeing to a one-year deal with Russian club, Admiral Vladivostok on September 20, 2016. After 17 games with Vladivostok, Akeson left Admiral and returned to the Binghamton Senators for the rest of the 2016–17 season.

Akeson was un-signed over the summer and belatedly agreed to a professional try-out contract to join the Syracuse Crunch training camp on September 26, 2017. He made the opening night roster for the 2017–18 season, and despite contributing with 1 goal and 5 points he was released by the Crunch after 11 games on November 9, 2017. Akeson as a free agent opted to sign abroad for the remainder of the season, signing with Swedish club, Mora IK of the SHL on December 19, 2017.

In the following off-season, Akeson decided to continue his European career, agreeing to a one-year deal with German club, Kölner Haie of the DEL, on July 25, 2018. He spent three seasons with Kölner Haie before joining the Straubing Tigers on July 1, 2021. He finished his first season with the Tigers as the top scorer in the league, with 68 points.

On January 22, 2025, Akeson signed a two-year contract with Genève-Servette HC of the National League (NL), starting with the 2025/26 season. He is expected to acquire Swiss citizenship in September 2025, allowing him to sign as a non-import player.

== Career statistics ==
			Regular season					Playoffs
Season	Team	League	GP	G	A	Pts	PIM	GP	G	A	Pts	PIM
2006–07	Cumberland Grads	CJHL	54	17	36	53	40	—	—	—	—	—
2007–08	Cumberland Grads	CJHL	34	18	43	61	14	—	—	—	—	—
2007–08	Kitchener Rangers	OHL	13	0	2	2	4	16	0	1	1	0
2008–09	Kitchener Rangers	OHL	56	20	44	64	16	—	—	—	—	—
2009–10	Kitchener Rangers	OHL	65	24	56	80	24	20	8	11	19	14
2010–11	Kitchener Rangers	OHL	67	24	84	108	23	7	3	6	9	0
2011–12	Adirondack Phantoms	AHL	76	14	41	55	26	—	—	—	—	—
2012–13	Trenton Titans	ECHL	14	2	8	10	7	—	—	—	—	—
2012–13	Adirondack Phantoms	AHL	62	20	33	53	27	—	—	—	—	—
2012–13	Philadelphia Flyers	NHL	1	1	0	1	0	—	—	—	—	—
2013–14	Adirondack Phantoms	AHL	70	24	40	64	42	—	—	—	—	—
2013–14	Philadelphia Flyers	NHL	1	0	1	1	0	7	2	1	3	4
2014–15	Philadelphia Flyers	NHL	13	0	0	0	8	—	—	—	—	—
2014–15	Lehigh Valley Phantoms	AHL	57	23	30	53	25	—	—	—	—	—
2015–16	Rochester Americans	AHL	52	8	22	30	18	—	—	—	—	—
2015–16	Binghamton Senators	AHL	21	5	17	22	0	—	—	—	—	—
2016–17	Admiral Vladivostok	KHL	17	1	4	5	2	—	—	—	—	—
2016–17	Binghamton Senators	AHL	57	20	31	51	22	—	—	—	—	—
2017–18	Syracuse Crunch	AHL	11	1	4	5	2	—	—	—	—	—
2017–18	Mora IK	SHL	24	4	6	10	8	—	—	—	—	—
2018–19	Kölner Haie	DEL	52	16	26	42	20	11	4	6	10	2
2019–20	Kölner Haie	DEL	50	9	26	35	16	—	—	—	—	—
2020–21	Kölner Haie	DEL	38	12	33	45	8	—	—	—	—	—
2021–22	Straubing Tigers	DEL	52	24	44	68	10	4	1	2	3	0
2022–23	Straubing Tigers	DEL	54	17	24	41	24	7	2	4	6	6
2023–24	HC Pustertal Wölfe	ICEHL	47	12	36	48	10	14	2	14	16	2
2024–25	HC Pustertal Wölfe	ICEHL	46	18	32	50	31	5	2	3	5	0
2025–26	Genève-Servette HC	NL	14	0	3	3	0	1	0	0	0	0
NHL totals			15	1	1	2	8	7	2	1	3	4

== Awards and honours ==
Award	Year
OHL
Second All-Rookie Team	2009
Eddie Powers Memorial Trophy	2011
Jim Mahon Memorial Trophy	2011
Leo Lalonde Memorial Trophy	2011
William Hanley Trophy	2011
