= Felix Brückmann =

German ice hockey player (born 1990)

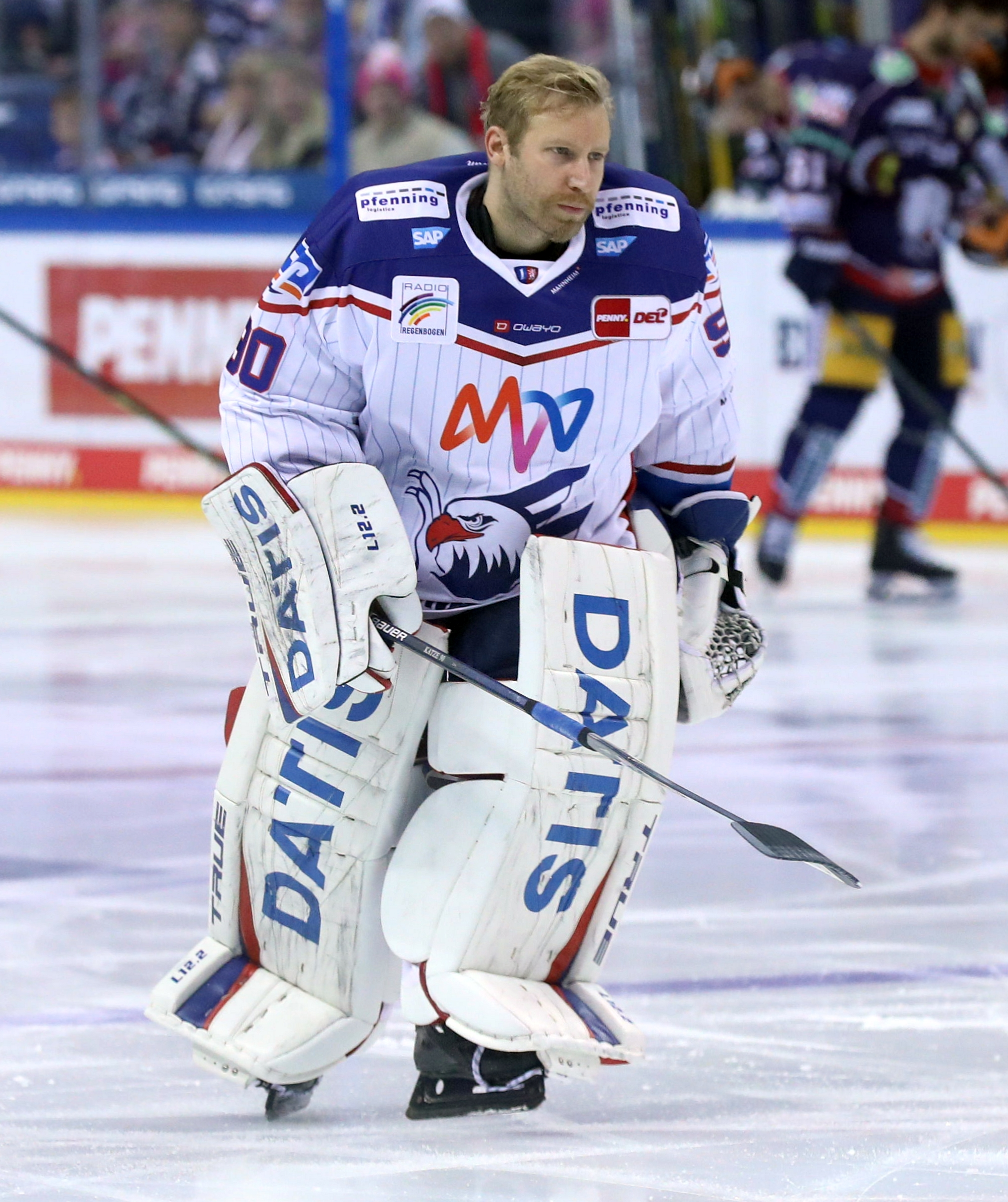
- Brückmann in 2021
- Born: 16 December 1990 (age 35) Breisach, Germany
- Height: 5 ft 11 in (180 cm)
- Weight: 172 lb (78 kg; 12 st 4 lb)
- Position: Goaltender
- Catches: Left
- DEL team Former teams: Adler Mannheim; Grizzlys Wolfsburg
- National team: Germany
- Playing career: 2008–present

Felix Brückmann (born 16 December 1990) is a German professional ice hockey goaltender. He is currently playing with Adler Mannheim of the Deutsche Eishockey Liga (DEL).

== Playing career ==
Brückmann made his professional debut with Adler Mannheim before moving as a free agent to Grizzlys Wolfsburg on 17 April 2014.

After six seasons in Wolfsburg, Brückmann returned to original club, Adler Mannheim, on a two-year contract on 20 March 2020.j

is since season 2025/2026 goalie in german team Kolnër Haie

== Career statistics ==
=== International ===
Year	Team	Event	Result	GP	W	L	T	MIN	GA	SO	GAA	SV%
2021	Germany	WC	4th	3	1	2	0	178	11	0	3.69	.810
Senior totals				3	1	2	0	178	11	0	3.69	.810
