= ERC Ingolstadt =

- Nickname: Die Panther (The Panthers)
- City: Ingolstadt, Germany
- League: Deutsche Eishockey Liga
- Founded: 1964
- Home arena: Saturn Arena (capacity: 4,815)
- Colors
- General manager: Tim Regan
- Head coach: Mark French
- Captain: Morgan Ellis
- Website: www.erc-ingolstadt.de

ERC Ingolstadt (Eishockey-und-Rollschuh club, German pronunciation: [ˈaɪshɔkeː ʔʊnt ˈʁɔlʃuː ˈklʊp]) is a German professional ice hockey club that plays in the Deutsche Eishockey Liga (DEL). Commonly known as the Panthers, the team plays its home games at the Saturn Arena in Ingolstadt.

== History ==
ERC Ingolstadt was promoted to the Deutsche Eishockey Liga in 2002 after three consecutive years of playing in the championship finals of Germany's second-tier hockey league, the 2.Bundesliga.

During the 2004–05 NHL lockout, Ingolstadt signed National Hockey League (NHL) players Marco Sturm, Andy McDonald, Jamie Langenbrunner and Aaron Ward. Other well-known NHL alumni include goaltender Jimmy Waite, Yves Sarault, Patric Hörnqvist and Jason Holland.

In the 2008–09 season, the team took part in the famous Spengler Cup.

ERC Ingolstadt won its first and only DEL championship in 2014 as an overwhelming underdog entering the playoffs. After finishing in ninth place in the regular season, the Panthers knocked out the three-time defending league champions Eisbären Berlin in overtime of the final game of the playoff qualification round. In the first round of the playoffs, the team of head coach Niklas Sundblad then shocked second-seeded Krefeld Pinguine in five games and then eliminated Hamburg Freezers, who had finished the regular season in first place, in six games. In the championship final, Ingolstadt defeated Kölner Haie in seven games, with goaltender Timo Pielmeier recording a 27-save shutout in Game 7.

By virtue of winning the DEL championship, ERC Ingolstadt was invited to play in the 2014–15 Champions Hockey League.

== Season records ==
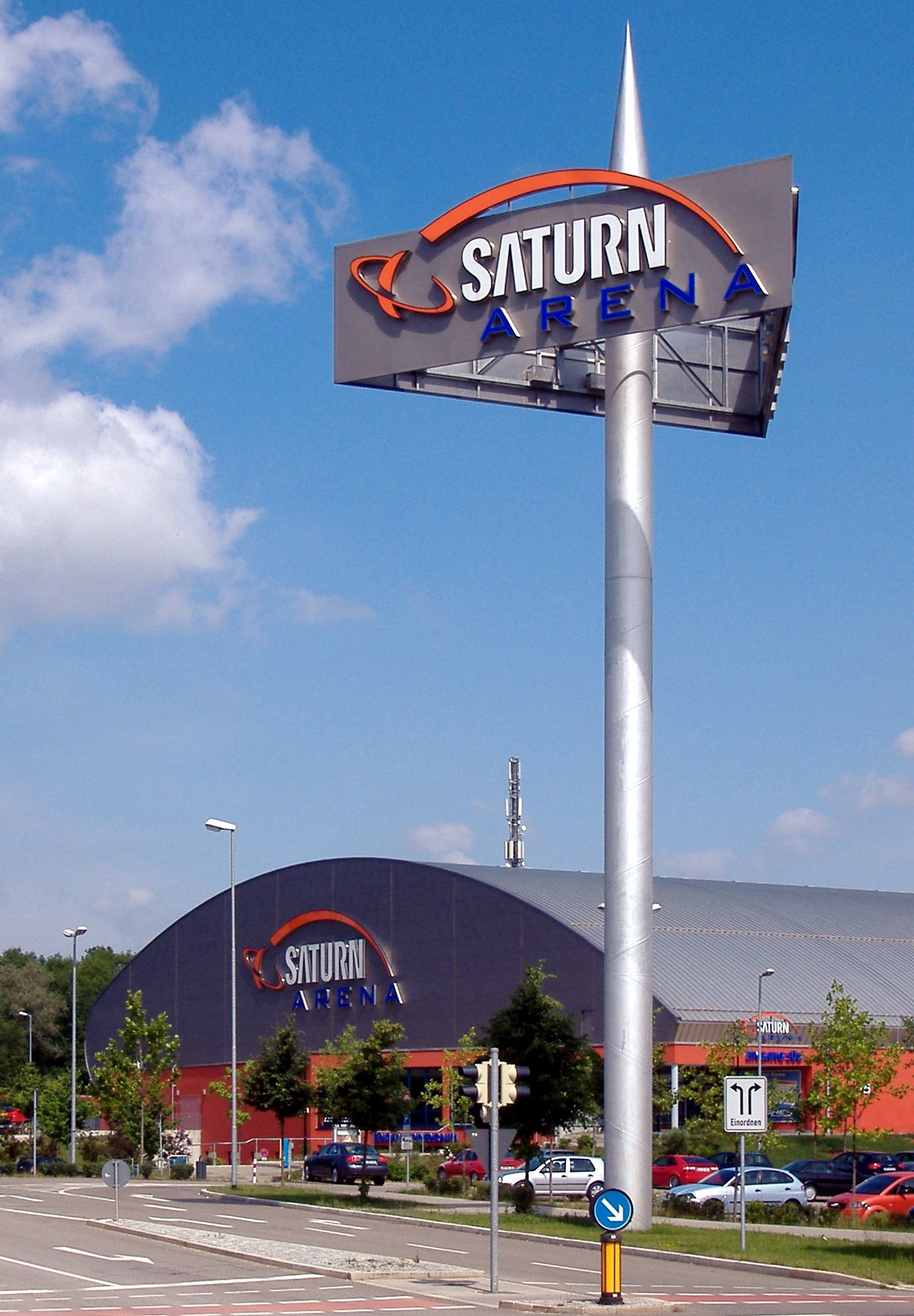
Saturn Arena in Ingolstadt, home ice of the Panthers.

Season	Games	Won	Lost	Tie	OTL	SOL	Points	Goals for	Goals against	Rank	Playoffs
DEL
2002–03	52	21	24	7	0	-	65	122	135	12	No playoffs
2003–04	52	31	19	0	2	-	92	132	118	7	Lost in Semi-finals
2004–05	52	31	18	0	3	-	91	149	139	5	Lost in Semi-finals
2005–06	52	33	17	-	0	2	98	162	120	2	Lost in Quarterfinals
2006–07	52	30	16	-	2	4	94	180	146	4	Lost in Quarterfinals
2007–08	56	30	22	-	3	1	83	180	190	10	Lost in Preliminary Finals
2008–09	52	22	24	-	4	2	68	144	155	12	No playoffs
2009–10	56	31	22	-	3	0	89	205	181	7	Lost in Semi-finals
2010–11	52	28	20	-	1	3	79	153	143	6	Lost in Quarterfinals
2011–12	52	26	16	-	2	3	93	168	150	2	Lost in Semi-finals
2012–13	52	21	18	-	3	2	84	161	149	6	Lost in Quarterfinals
2013–14	52	21	22	-	4	2	75	138	149	9	Champions
2014–15	52	29	17	-	3	2	94	182	152	3	Lost in Final
2015–16	52	23	22	-	4	3	76	155	161	8	Lost in preliminary playoffs
2016–17	52	24	22	-	2	4	76	159	157	7	Lost in preliminary playoffs
2017–18	52	20	19	-	3	2	79	147	137	4	Lost in Quarterfinals
2018–19	52	23	19	-	2	1	86	158	152	5	Lost in Quarterfinals
2019–20	52	19	19	-	2	2	81	164	161	7	Cancelled due to the COVID-19 pandemic.
2020–21	38	20	14	-	2	2	59	123	109	5	Lost in Semi-finals
2021–22	55	26	19	-	6	4	83	176	158	7	Lost in preliminary playoffs
2022–23	56	34	16	-	3	3	103	182	142	2	Lost in Final
2023–24	52	17	20	-	4	4	73	132	138	9	Lost in Quarterfinals
2024–25	52	33	5	-	4	10	113	191	128	1	Lost in Semi-finals
2025–26	52	34	15	-	1	2	100	179	126	4	Lost in Quarterfinals

== Players ==
=== Current roster ===
Updated 29 September 2024.

No.	Nat	Player	Pos	S/G	Age	Acquired	Birthplace
11	(United States)	Kenny Agostino	LW	L	34	2024	Morristown, New Jersey, United States
33	(France)	Charles Bertrand	RW	R	35	2022	Paris, France
22	(Canada)	Mat Bodie	D	L	36	2020	East St. Paul, Manitoba, Canada
75	(Canada)	Alex Breton	D	L	29	2024	Sainte-Marie, Quebec, Canada
12	(Germany)	Noah Dunham	F	L	24	2023	Amberg, Germany
4	(Canada)	Morgan Ellis	D	R	34	2024	Summerside, Prince Edward Island, Canada
17	(Canada)	Abbott Girduckis	RW	R	31	2024	Belleville, Ontario, Canada
27	(Germany)	Niklas Hübner	D	L	22	2021	Ingolstadt, Germany
25	(Germany)	Leon Hüttl	D	R	25	2021	Bad Tölz, Germany
89	(Canada)	Austen Keating	C	L	27	2024	Guelph, Ontario, Canada
8	(Germany)	Philipp Krauß	F	L	25	2022	Kaufbeuren, Germany
90	(Germany)	Jan Nijenhuis	F	R	25	2023	Munich, Germany
86	(Germany)	Daniel Pietta	C	L	39	2020	Krefeld, Germany
9	(Canada)	Myles Powell	LW	R	32	2024	Comox, British Columbia, Canada
95	(Germany)	Philipp Preto	D	L	25	2024	Speyer, Germany
1	(Germany)	Nico Pertuch	G	L	21	2023	Landshut, Germany
2	(United Kingdom)	Sam Ruopp	D	L	30	2024	Regina, Saskatchewan, Canada
92	(Germany)	Daniel Schmölz	LW	L	34	2024	Füssen, Germany
91	(Canada)	Riley Sheen	LW	L	31	2024	Edmonton, Alberta, Canada
21	(United States)	Wayne Simpson (A)	RW	R	36	2019	Fort Gordon, Georgia, United States
19	(Germany)	Wojciech Stachowiak	LW	L	27	2020	Gdańsk, Poland
5	(Germany)	Fabio Wagner (C)	D	L	30	2014	Landshut, Germany
31	(United States)	Devin Williams	G	L	30	2023	Saginaw, Michigan, United States

== Honors ==
=== Champions ===
- Deutsche Eishockey Liga Championship: 2014
- 2.Bundesliga Championship: 2001
