= 2022–23 DEL season =

- League: Deutsche Eishockey Liga
- Sport: Ice hockey
- Duration: 15 September 2022 – 27 April 2023
- Teams: 15

Regular season
- Season champions: EHC Red Bull München
- Season MVP: Yasin Ehliz
- Top scorer: Yasin Ehliz; Andreas Thuresson (60 points)
- Relegated to DEL2: Bietigheim Steelers

Finals
- Champions: EHC Red Bull München
- Runners-up: ERC Ingolstadt
- Finals MVP: Maximilian Kastner

DEL seasons
- ← 2021–22 2023–24 →

The 2022–23 Deutsche Eishockey Liga season was the 29th season since the founding of the Deutsche Eishockey Liga. It started on 15 September 2022.

EHC Red Bull München won their fourth title after a finals win over ERC Ingolstadt.

The season was contested by 15 teams, as the 2021–22 DEL2 champion, Löwen Frankfurt, received a license, replacing the Krefeld Pinguine, who were relegated to the DEL2

== Teams ==
Locations of the Teams of the 2022–23 DEL season

Team	City	Arena	Capacity
Augsburger Panther	Augsburg	Curt Frenzel Stadium	6,218
Eisbären Berlin	Berlin	Mercedes-Benz Arena	14,200
Bietigheim Steelers	Bietigheim-Bissingen	EgeTrans Arena	4,500
Fischtown Pinguins	Bremerhaven	Eisarena Bremerhaven	4,674
Düsseldorfer EG	Düsseldorf	PSD Bank Dome	13,400
Löwen Frankfurt	Frankfurt	Eissporthalle Frankfurt	6,000
ERC Ingolstadt	Ingolstadt	Saturn Arena	4,815
Iserlohn Roosters	Iserlohn	Eissporthalle Iserlohn	5,000
Kölner Haie	Cologne	Lanxess Arena	18,500
Adler Mannheim	Mannheim	SAP Arena	13,600
EHC Red Bull München	Munich	Olympia Eishalle	6,256
Nürnberg Ice Tigers	Nuremberg	Arena Nürnberger Versicherung	7,810
Schwenninger Wild Wings	Villingen-Schwenningen	Helios Arena	6,215
Straubing Tigers	Straubing	Eisstadion am Pulverturm	6,000
Grizzlys Wolfsburg	Wolfsburg	Eis Arena Wolfsburg	4,660

== Regular season ==
=== Standings ===
Pos	Team	Pld	W	OTW	OTL	L	GF	GA	GD	Pts	Qualification or relegation
1	EHC Red Bull München	56	36	6	2	12	205	132	+73	122	Playoffs
2	ERC Ingolstadt	56	29	5	6	16	182	142	+40	103	Playoffs
3	Adler Mannheim	56	24	10	7	15	162	136	+26	99	Playoffs
4	Straubing Tigers	56	25	9	5	17	190	166	+24	98	Playoffs
5	Grizzlys Wolfsburg	56	24	6	9	17	172	150	+22	93	Playoffs
6	Kölner Haie	56	25	7	3	21	197	153	+44	92	Playoffs
7	Düsseldorfer EG	56	22	10	5	19	150	137	+13	91	Pre-playoffs
8	Fischtown Pinguins	56	22	6	9	19	153	144	+9	87	Pre-playoffs
9	Nürnberg Ice Tigers	56	22	5	5	24	162	186	−24	81	Pre-playoffs
10	Löwen Frankfurt	56	19	6	10	21	163	174	−11	79	Pre-playoffs
11	Eisbären Berlin	56	18	6	10	22	160	171	−11	76	
12	Schwenninger Wild Wings	56	19	5	8	24	144	151	−7	75	
13	Iserlohn Roosters	56	19	5	6	26	149	192	−43	73	
14	Augsburger Panther	56	11	5	8	32	138	193	−55	51	
15	Bietigheim Steelers (R)	56	8	6	4	38	125	225	−100	40	Relegated to DEL2

Source: DEL
Rules for classification: 1) points; 2) head-to-head points; 3) head-to-head goal difference; 4) head-to-head number of goals scored.
(R) Relegated

=== Results ===
Home \ Away	AUG	BER	BIE	BRE	DÜS	FRA	ING	ISE	KÖL	MAN	MUN	NÜR	SCH	STR	WOL	AUG	BER	BIE	BRE	DÜS	FRA	ING	ISE	KÖL	MAN	MUN	NÜR	SCH	STR	WOL
Augsburger Panther	—	2–3	2–1	0–4	2–1	3–6	0–5	5–4	5–2	1–4	1–4	3–1	2–4	7–4	2–3	—	3–4	8–2	4–3	2–3	1–5	5–4 (Note: Overtime)	2–1	2–3	5–4	1–6	3–4	2–3	4–5	1–3
Eisbären Berlin	4–3	—	2–4	4–3	5–2	5–4	3–4 (Note: Shootout)	1–6	3–2	2–4	2–3	3–2	2–4	1–2	1–2	4–2	—	5–0	3–2	3–2	3–1	5–1	2–4	3–4	2–3	3–4	2–3	3–4	4–1	6–4
Bietigheim Steelers	5–3	2–5	—	2–1	3–4	3–6	0–3	2–4	0–2	4–5	2–5	6–5	2–1	1–5	0–5	3–2	6–2	—	2–4	2–8	1–2	3–4	6–4	2–5	4–5	1–5	5–2	3–5	4–1	3–5
Fischtown Pinguins	4–3	2–1	5–0	—	4–2	2–3	0–3	5–3	4–2	4–3	1–0	1–3	2–3	4–5	3–2	1–2	3–2	3–1	—	2–3	2–1	4–1	4–2	5–2	3–1	1–2	2–3	3–2	3–4	5–1
Düsseldorfer EG	0–2	4–2	4–1	3–1	—	2–4	4–3	4–1	3–4	1–0	1–2	2–4	4–3	1–4	2–1	5–4	4–2	0–1	2–1	—	4–1	4–2	4–1	3–2	0–4	1–2	6–2	3–2		0–1
Löwen Frankfurt	3–5	2–1	5–4	3–4	4–3	—	2–3	5–2	1–5	3–4	4–3	5–3	2–3	3–4	4–5	4–3	2–4	6–3	2–1	1–2	—	1–5	3–2	3–5	3–2	2–3	1–2	5–2	2–5	4–3
ERC Ingolstadt	1–0	1–3	1–2	6–2	4–3	3–2	—	5–2	1–4	2–5	3–6	5–1	4–1	5–2	3–2	5–1	4–2	3–2	6–3	3–1	1–6	—	1–2	8–3	1–2	1–3	6–0	5–2	6–3	4–1
Iserlohn Roosters	2–1	3–2	7–1	2–3	7–4	3–2	1–4	—	5–4	3–2	1–4	3–4	4–1	4–1	2–5	4–3	4–1	0–3	5–4	1–2	5–3	2–1	—	2–8	0–3	0–5	4–5	3–2	1–8	2–1
Kölner Haie	4–2	3–7	8–1	5–0	2–3	3–1	2–3	7–1	—	1–3	6–3	5–4	3–4	7–2	3–2	5–2	3–2	8–2	1–2	5–2	9–0	1–4	4–3	—	4–2	2–3	2–1	1–4	2–1	2–3
Adler Mannheim	1–0	3–4	4–2	2–0	1–4	5–1	3–5	3–0	1–2	—	3–2	6–3	1–2	3–2	5–4	3–1	2–5	4–1	3–2	2–3	3–2	6–3	0–3	2–5	—	5–1	4–1	0–3	4–2	4–2
EHC Red Bull München	6–0	4–1	3–2	2–4	2–5	4–0	3–1	5–2	6–3	5–2	—	3–4	1–5	3–2	4–2	3–2	4–3	6–1	5–2	4–5	3–2	3–2	8–3	2–4	6–2	—	2–4	1–2	5–4	2–1
Nürnberg Ice Tigers	2–4	4–2	6–3	3–2	4–1	3–2	1–4	2–3	4–2	3–2	1–5	—	5–4	4–1	2–5	6–4	0–2	4–1	4–2	2–3	1–6	2–3	5–1	4–2	2–0	3–6	—	7–3	7–4	1–4
Schwenninger Wild Wings	1–0	6–2	2–3	1–3	1–2	0–1	0–4	5–2	3–1	2–4	2–3	5–2	—	3–2	3–4	3–0	4–6	5–2	2–1	1–2	3–4	3–5	2–3	2–3	1–2	2–5	4–0	—	2–3	0–2
Straubing Tigers	5–2	6–3	2–1	1–4	4–1	4–3	2–1	3–4	3–2	2–3	3–4	5–2	3–1	—	5–2	5–1	4–3	5–2	4–3	3–2	4–3	4–3	5–1	4–3	2–3	4–1	4–2	5–1	—	5–4
Grizzlys Wolfsburg	2–1	5–0	6–1	5–7	3–2	2–5	9–1	3–2	3–5	2–3	5–6	4–2	2–1	5–1	—	6–7	1–0	3–1	2–3	0–2	1–2	3–2	4–3	2–0	3–2	1–5	5–1	2–4	4–3	—

Source: DEL
Legend: Blue = home team win; Yellow = draw; Red = away team win.

== Playoffs ==
The playoffs were held between 7 March and 23 April 2023.

=== Bracket ===
First round
7	Düsseldorfer EG	2
10	Löwen Frankfurt	0
8	Fischtown Pinguins	2
9	Nürnberg Ice Tigers	0

Quarterfinals
1	EHC Red Bull München	4
8	Fischtown Pinguins	2
2	ERC Ingolstadt	4
7	Düsseldorfer EG	1
3	Adler Mannheim	4
6	Kölner Haie	2
4	Straubing Tigers	3
5	Grizzlys Wolfsburg	4

Semifinals
1	EHC Red Bull München	4
5	Grizzlys Wolfsburg	3
(Pairings are re-seeded after the first and second round)
2	ERC Ingolstadt	4
3	Adler Mannheim	2

Finals
1	EHC Red Bull München	4
2	ERC Ingolstadt	1

=== Pre-playoffs ===
The pre-playoffs were played between 7 and 10 March 2023 in a best-of-three mode.

==== Düsseldorfer EG vs Löwen Frankfurt ====
7 March 2023	Düsseldorfer EG	5–0	Löwen Frankfurt	PSD Bank Dome	Recap
No scoring		First period	No scoring
Alexander Blank – 31:28; Cedric Schiemenz – 33:58; Stephen MacAulay – 36:18		Second period	No scoring
Alexander Barta – 43:05; Daniel Fischbuch (PP) – 56:37		Third period	No scoring
Henrik Haukeland (18 saves / 18 shots)		Goalie stats	Jake Hildebrand (24 saves / 29 shots)

10 March 2023	Löwen Frankfurt	1–5	Düsseldorfer EG	Eissporthalle Frankfurt	Recap
No scoring		First period	11:43 – Victor Svensson (PP); 15:01 – Alec McCrea
Dylan Wruck (PP) – 39:43		Second period	21:44 – Alexander Barta
No scoring		Third period	43:12 – Alexander Blank; 49:09 – Alexander Barta
Jake Hildebrand (28 saves / 33 shots)		Goalie stats	Henrik Haukeland (19 saves / 20 shots)

Düsseldorf won series 2–0

==== Fischtown Pinguins vs Nürnberg Ice Tigers ====
7 March 2023	Fischtown Pinguins	3–1	Nürnberg Ice Tigers	Eisarena Bremerhaven	Recap
Jan Urbas – 00:58		First period	No scoring
No scoring		Second period	20:14 – Daniel Schmölz (PP)
Jan Urbas (PP) – 48:05; Jan Urbas (EN) – 58:43		Third period	No scoring
Maximilian Franzreb (26 saves / 27 shots)		Goalie stats	Niklas Treutle (16 saves / 19 shots)

10 March 2023	Nürnberg Ice Tigers	2–4	Fischtown Pinguins	Arena Nürnberger Versicherung	Recap
No scoring		First period	05:07 – Miha Verlič (PP); 05:37 – Markus Vikingstad
Tim Fleischer (PP) – 28:42; Jakob Ustorf – 30:06		Second period	No scoring
No scoring		Third period	49:59 – Alex Friesen; 58:44 – Jan Urbas (EN)
Niklas Treutle (22 saves / 26 shots)		Goalie stats	Maximilian Franzreb (28 saves / 30 shots)

Bremerhaven won series 2–0

=== Quarterfinals ===
The quarterfinals were played between 14 and 29 March 2023 in a best-of-seven mode.

==== EHC Red Bull München vs Fischtown Pinguins ====
15 March 2023	EHC Red Bull München	1–3	Fischtown Pinguins	Olympia Eishalle	Recap
No scoring		First period	No scoring
No scoring		Second period	28:09 – Ross Mauermann; 41:26 – Markus Vikingstad
Austin Ortega – 57:50		Third period	59:36 – Markus Vikingstad (EN)
Mathias Niederberger (16 saves / 19 shots)		Goalie stats	Maximilian Franzreb (50 saves / 51 shots)

17 March 2023	Fischtown Pinguins	3–2	EHC Red Bull München	Eisarena Bremerhaven	Recap
No scoring		First period	No scoring
Jacob Virtanen – 25:15		Second period	36:22 – Filip Varejcka; 39:45 – Austin Ortega (PP)
Antti Tyrväinen – 44:46; Phillip Bruggisser (PP) – 48:39		Third period	No scoring
Maximilian Franzreb (31 saves / 33 shots)		Goalie stats	Mathias Niederberger (23 saves / 26 shots)

19 March 2023	EHC Red Bull München	7–1	Fischtown Pinguins	Olympia Eishalle	Recap
Filip Varejcka – 09:42; Trevor Parkes – 12:40; Yasin Ehliz (PP) – 19:45		First period	No scoring
Ben Street – 24:51; Chris DeSousa (PP) – 38:58		Second period	No scoring
Filip Varejcka – 44:49; Justin Schütz – 50:03		Third period	53:16 – Phillip Bruggisser (PP2)
Mathias Niederberger (16 saves / 17 shots)		Goalie stats	Maximilian Franzreb (24 saves / 31 shots)

22 March 2023	Fischtown Pinguins	1–3	EHC Red Bull München	Eisarena Bremerhaven	Recap
Christian Wejse – 04:54		First period	13:35 – Trevor Parkes (PP)
No scoring		Second period	No scoring
No scoring		Third period	46:41 – Patrick Hager; 47:56 – Austin Ortega (PS, EA)
Maximilian Franzreb (22 saves / 25 shots)		Goalie stats	Mathias Niederberger (15 saves / 16 shots)

24 March 2023	EHC Red Bull München	4–0	Fischtown Pinguins	Olympia Eishalle	Recap
Yasin Ehliz (PP) – 17:29		First period	No scoring
Patrick Hager – 28:59; Ben Street – 38:32; Ben Smith – 39:55		Second period	No scoring
No scoring		Third period	No scoring
Mathias Niederberger (15 saves / 15 shots)		Goalie stats	Maximilian Franzreb (27 saves / 31 shots)

26 March 2023	Fischtown Pinguins	1–2	EHC Red Bull München	Eisarena Bremerhaven	Recap
No scoring		First period	No scoring
Phillip Bruggisser (PP2) – 23:44		Second period	29:29 – Yasin Ehliz
No scoring		Third period	51:18 – Austin Ortega (PP)
Maximilian Franzreb (33 saves / 35 shots)		Goalie stats	Mathias Niederberger (21 saves / 22 shots)

Munich won series 4–2

==== ERC Ingolstadt vs Düsseldorfer EG ====
15 March 2023	ERC Ingolstadt	5–4	2OT	Düsseldorfer EG	Saturn Arena	Recap
Mirko Höfflin (PP2) – 10:43		First period		No scoring
Charles Bertrand – 25:18		Second period		20:24 – Philip Gogulla; 34:26 – Mikko Kousa
Ty Ronning – 52:15; Tye McGinn – 57:10		Third period		36:57 – Stephen Harper (PP); 54:01 – Philip Gogulla
Austin Ortega (EA) – 81:42		Second overtime period		No scoring
Michael Garteig (24 saves / 28 shots)		Goalie stats		Henrik Haukeland (45 saves / 50 shots)

17 March 2023	Düsseldorfer EG	1–3	ERC Ingolstadt	PSD Bank Dome	Recap
No scoring		First period	11:33 – Leon Hüttl
No scoring		Second period	No scoring
Alexander Ehl – 56:18		Third period	52:17 – Daniel Pietta; 59:26 – Justin Feser (EN)
Henrik Haukeland (16 saves / 19 shots)		Goalie stats	Michael Garteig (31 saves / 32 shots)

19 March 2023	ERC Ingolstadt	1–2	OT	Düsseldorfer EG	Saturn Arena	Recap
Fabio Wagner – 05:50		First period		No scoring
No scoring		Second period		No scoring
No scoring		Third period		55:56 – Stephen MacAulay (PP2)
No scoring		First overtime period		76:38 – Alexander Ehl
Michael Garteig (26 saves / 28 shots)		Goalie stats		Henrik Haukeland (37 saves / 38 shots)

21 March 2023	Düsseldorfer EG	1–2	ERC Ingolstadt	PSD Bank Dome	Recap
No scoring		First period	No scoring
Daniel Fischbuch (PP) – 27:14		Second period	No scoring
No scoring		Third period	53:05 – Maurice Edwards; 53:40 – Justin Feser
Henrik Haukeland (20 saves / 22 shots)		Goalie stats	Michael Garteig (12 saves / 13 shots)

24 March 2023	ERC Ingolstadt	7–6	OT	Düsseldorfer EG	Saturn Arena	Recap
Ty Ronning (PP) – 11:23		First period		05:53 – Josef Eham; 17:24 – Stephen MacAulay
Wayne Simpson (PP) – 26:16; Frederik Storm (PP) – 35:38		Second period		23:28 – Daniel Fischbuch (PP); 26:31 – Philip Gogulla; 30:15 – Alexander Barta; 35:57 – Tobias Eder
Mirko Höfflin – 49:57; Wayne Simpson (EA) – 57:14; Ty Ronning (EA) – 59:51		Third period		No scoring
Stefan Matteau – 62:24		First overtime period		No scoring
Michael Garteig (29 saves / 35 shots)		Goalie stats		Henrik Haukeland (36 saves / 43 shots)

Ingolstadt won series 4–1

==== Adler Mannheim vs Kölner Haie ====
14 March 2023	Adler Mannheim	0–4	Kölner Haie	SAP Arena	Recap
No scoling		First period	05:30 – David McIntyre (PP)
No scoring		Second period	22:37 – Andreas Thuresson; 23:15 – Carter Proft; 35:59 – David McIntyre
No scoring		Third period	No scoring
Felix Brückmann (18 saves / 22 shots)		Goalie stats	Mirko Pantkowski (28 saves / 28 shots)

17 March 2023	Kölner Haie	1–2	Adler Mannheim	Lanxess Arena	Recap
No scoring		First period	14:06 – Taro Jentzsch (PP)
No scoring		Second period	No scoring
Nicholas Baptiste (EA) – 58:30		Third period	41:50 – Ryan MacInnis
Mirko Pantkowski (29 saves / 31 shots)		Goalie stats	Arno Tiefensee (13 saves / 14 shots)

19 March 2023	Adler Mannheim	2–3	2OT	Kölner Haie	SAP Arena	Recap
No scoring		First period		No scoring
Tyler Gaudet (PP) – 21:17		Second period		31:41 – Mark Olver (PP); 35:27 – Nicholas Bailen
Matthias Plachta (PP, EA) – 58:43		Third period		No scoring
No scoring		Second overtime period		86:03 – David McIntyre
Arno Tiefensee (26 saves / 30 shots)		Goalie stats		Mirko Pantkowski (37 saves / 39 shots)

21 March 2023	Kölner Haie	3–7	Adler Mannheim	Lanxess Arena	Recap
No scoring		First period	00:16 – Matthias Plachta; 05:21 – Mark Katic; 15:53 – Taro Jentzsch (PP)
Moritz Müller – 25:11		Second period	28:09 – David Wolf
Nicholas Baptiste – 41:54; Mark Olver – 45:05		Third period	43:42 – Stefan Loibl (PP); 50:27 – Stefan Loibl; 54:47 – Tim Wohlgemuth
Mirko Pantkowski (15 saves / 22 shots)		Goalie stats	Arno Tiefensee (32 saves / 35 shots)

24 March 2023	Adler Mannheim	4–3	Kölner Haie	SAP Arena	Recap
No scoring		First period	No scoring
David Wolf – 37:05		Second period	25:00 – Nicholas Baptiste; 28:31 – Jan Luca Sennhenn; 32:08 – Brady Austin
Matthias Plachta – 52:26; David Wolf (EA) – 59:28; Nico Krämmer – 59:41		Third period	No scoring
Arno Tiefensee (24 saves / 27 shots)		Goalie stats	Mirko Pantkowski (29 saves / 33 shots)

26 March 2023	Kölner Haie	2–3	Adler Mannheim	Lanxess Arena	Recap
Maximilian Kammerer – 19:54		First period	No scoring
Andreas Thuresson (PP) – 34:47		Second period	23:38 – David Wolf; 29:12 – Matthias Plachta; 30:03 – Borna Rendulić
No scoring		Third period	No scoring
Mirko Pantkowski (16 saves / 19 shots)		Goalie stats	Arno Tiefensee (27 saves / 29 shots)

Mannheim won series 4–2

==== Straubing Tigers vs Grizzlys Wolfsburg ====
14 March 2023	Straubing Tigers	5–3	Grizzlys Wolfsburg	Eisstadion am Pulverturm	Recap
Mike Connolly (SH) – 09:27		First period	No scoring
Jason Akeson – 29:09; JC Lipon – 37:24		Second period	20:47 – Jordan Murray; 26:59 – Fabio Pfohl; 38:28 – Björn Krupp
Brandon Manning – 41:27; Marcel Brandt – 52:20		Third period	No scoring
Hunter Miska (30 saves / 33 shots)		Goalie stats	Dustin Strahlmeier (18 saves / 23 shots)

17 March 2023	Grizzlys Wolfsburg	3–1	Straubing Tigers	Eis Arena Wolfsburg	Recap
No scoring		First period	No scoring
Gerrit Fauser – 39:35		Second period	No scoring
Trevor Mingoia (PP) – 56:55; Spencer Machacek (EN) – 59:45		Third period	53:02 – Travis Turnbull (PP)
Dustin Strahlmeier (26 saves / 27 shots)		Goalie stats	Hunter Miska (21 saves / 24 shots)

19 March 2023	Straubing Tigers	1–2	Grizzlys Wolfsburg	Eisstadion am Pulverturm	Recap
Jason Akeson (PP) – 09:39		First period	03:08 – Matt Lorito
No scoring		Second period	39:36 – J.C. Beaudin (PP)
No scoring		Third period	No scoring
Hunter Miska (20 saves / 22 shots)		Goalie stats	Dustin Strahlmeier (23 saves / 24 shots)

22 March 2023	Grizzlys Wolfsburg	1–3	Straubing Tigers	Eis Arena Wolfsburg	Recap
No scoring		First period	06:44 – Marcel Brandt; 09:28 – Marcel Brandt
J.C. Beaudin (PP) – 23:31		Second period	28:48 – Parker Tuomie
No scoring		Third period	No scoring
Dustin Strahlmeier (38 saves / 41 shots)		Goalie stats	Hunter Miska (25 saves / 27 shots)

24 March 2023	Straubing Tigers	5–0	Grizzlys Wolfsburg	Eisstadion am Pulverturm	Recap
No scoring		First period	No scoring
Travis St. Denis – 21:41; Mike Connolly – 29:54; Travis St. Denis (PP) – 35:19		Second period	No scoring
Mark Alt – 42:53; Michael Connolly (SH, EN) – 59:07		Third period	No scoring
Hunter Miska (28 saves / 28 shots)		Goalie stats	Dustin Strahlmeier (36 saves / 41 shots)

26 March 2023	Grizzlys Wolfsburg	4–3	OT	Straubing Tigers	Eis Arena Wolfsburg	Recap
Darren Archibald – 00:22		First period		02:21 – Travis St. Denis
No scoring		Second period		27:23 – Joshua Samanski
J.C. Beaudin – 44:12; J.C. Beaudin (PP) – 56:58		Third period		45:45 – Luke Adam
Spencer Machacek – 61:34		First overtime period		No scoring
Dustin Strahlmeier (30 saves / 33 shots)		Goalie stats		Hunter Miska (25 saves / 29 shots)

29 March 2023	Straubing Tigers	1–3	Grizzlys Wolfsburg	Eisstadion am Pulverturm	Recap
Travis St. Denis – 11:47		First period	No scoring
No scoring		Second period	28:22 – Laurin Braun; 34:46 – Darren Archibald
No scoring		Third period	49:28 – Luis Schinko
Hunter Miska (13 saves / 16 shots)		Goalie stats	Dustin Strahlmeier (27 saves / 28 shots)

Wolfsburg won series 4–3

=== Semifinals ===
The semifinals were played between 31 March and 12 April 2023 in a best-of-seven mode.

==== EHC Red Bull München vs Grizzlys Wolfsburg ====
31 March 2023	EHC Red Bull München	5–2	Grizzlys Wolfsburg	Olympia Eishalle	Recap
Trevor Parkes – 01:25; Emil Johansson – 06:44		First period	No scoring
Maximilian Kastner – 27:18; Andreas Eder (PP) – 28:59		Second period	22:42 – Matt Lorito; 39:48 – Gerrit Fauser
Yasin Ehliz – 53:23		Third period	No scoring
Mathias Niederberger (25 saves / 27 shots)		Goalie stats	Dustin Strahlmeier (38 saves / 43 shots)

2 April 2023	Grizzlys Wolfsburg	3–2	EHC Red Bull München	Eis Arena Wolfsburg	Recap
Tyler Morley – 15:12; Darren Archibald – 15:31		First period	No scoring
No scoring		Second period	27:41 – Filip Varejcka
Spencer Machacek (PP) – 47:34		Third period	53:04 – Patrick Hager
Dustin Strahlmeier (44 saves / 46 shots)		Goalie stats	Mathias Niederberger (14 saves / 17 shots)

4 April 2023	EHC Red Bull München	3–5	Grizzlys Wolfsburg	Olympia Eishalle	Recap
No scoring		First period	No scoring
Yasin Ehliz (PP) – 37:49; Chris DeSousa (SH) – 39:51		Second period	22:33 – Spencer Machacek; 28:12 – Trevor Mingoia; 33:48 – Dustin Jeffrey; 38:38 – Tyler Morley (SH)
Zach Redmond (PP) – 44:25		Third period	49:41 – Spencer Machacek
Mathias Niederberger (20 saves / 25 shots)		Goalie stats	Dustin Strahlmeier (46 saves / 49 shots)

6 April 2023	Grizzlys Wolfsburg	1–3	EHC Red Bull München	Eis Arena Wolfsburg	Recap
Darren Archibald – 19:27		First period	No scoring
No scoring		Second period	No scoring
No scoring		Third period	40:30 – Ben Smith; 44:25 – Konrad Abeltshauser; 59:43 – Yasin Ehliz (EN)
Dustin Strahlmeier (23 saves / 26 shots)		Goalie stats	Mathias Niederberger (15 saves / 16 shots)

8 April 2023	EHC Red Bull München	3–2	OT	Grizzlys Wolfsburg	Olympia Eishalle	Recap
Chris DeSousa – 00:54; Austin Ortega – 04:06		First period		06:00 – Laurin Braun
No scoring		Second period		No scoring
No scoring		Third period		49:11 – Spencer Machacek (PP)
Patrick Hager – 63:17		First overtime period		No scoring
Mathias Niederberger (23 saves / 25 shots)		Goalie stats		Dustin Strahlmeier (34 saves / 37 shots)

10 April 2023	Grizzlys Wolfsburg	3–2	EHC Red Bull München	Eis Arena Wolfsburg	Recap
Trevor Mingoia – 17:45		First period	No scoring
Tyler Morley – 21:08; Fabio Pfohl – 34:42		Second period	33:20 – Andreas Eder (PP)
No scoring		Third period	40:47 – Chris DeSousa
Dustin Strahlmeier (44 saves / 46 shots)		Goalie stats	Mathias Niederberger (11 saves / 14 shots)

12 April 2023	EHC Red Bull München	7–2	Grizzlys Wolfsburg	Olympia Eishalle	Recap
Justin Schütz – 02:46; Yasin Ehliz – 10:56		First period	No scoring
Chris DeSousa (PP) – 26:28; Trevor Parkes (PP) – 28:44; Patrick Hager (PP) – 31:05		Second period	35:05 – Laurin Braun (PP); 37:20 – Darren Archibald
Filip Varejcka (EN) – 56:42		Third period	No scoring
Mathias Niederberger (12 saves / 14 shots)		Goalie stats	Dustin Strahlmeier (39 saves / 46 shots)

Munich won series 4–3

==== ERC Ingolstadt vs Adler Mannheim ====
31 March 2023	ERC Ingolstadt	1–3	Adler Mannheim	Saturn Arena	Recap
No scoring		First period	No scoring
Tye McGinn – 20:47		Second period	No scoring
No scoring		Third period	51:59 – Ryan MacInnis; 57:05 – Lean Bergmann; 58:39 – Stefan Loibl (EN)
Kevin Reich (16 saves / 19 shots)		Goalie stats	Arno Tiefensee (25 saves / 26 shots)

2 April 2023	Adler Mannheim	3–6	ERC Ingolstadt	SAP Arena	Recap
No scoring		First period	17:07 – Justin Feser (PP)
Markus Eisenschmid – 26:32; Matthias Plachta (PP) – 29:20		Second period	25:28 – Colton Jobke
Thomas Larkin – 52:23		Third period	42:13 – Ty Ronning; 43:44 – Daniel Pietta (PP); 44:00 – Frederik Storm; 58:40 – Leon Hüttl (PP)
Arno Tiefensee (23 saves / 29 shots)		Goalie stats	Kevin Reich (17 saves / 20 shots)

4 April 2023	ERC Ingolstadt	1–2	Adler Mannheim	Saturn Arena	Recap
No scoring		First period	No scoring
Stefan Matteau – 26:19		Second period	26:37 – Matthias Plachta; 34:56 – Jordan Szwarz (PP)
No scoring		Third period	No scoring
Kevin Reich (22 saves / 24 shots)		Goalie stats	Arno Tiefensee (28 saves / 29 shots)

6 April 2023	Adler Mannheim	0–1	ERC Ingolstadt	SAP Arena	Recap
No scoring		First period	No scoring
No scoring		Second period	20:48 – Leon Hüttl
No scoring		Third period	No scoring
Arno Tiefensee (19 saves / 20 shots)		Goalie stats	Kevin Reich (26 saves / 26 shots)

8 April 2023	ERC Ingolstadt	4–1	Adler Mannheim	Saturn Arena	Recap
Ty Ronning – 00:08		First period	No scoring
Tye McGinn – 39:22		Second period	38:17 – Taro Jentzsch
Stefan Matteau – 58:54; Enrico Henriquez-Morales (EN) – 59:43		Third period	No scoring
Kevin Reich (25 saves / 26 shots)		Goalie stats	Arno Tiefensee (24 saves / 28 shots)

10 April 2023	Adler Mannheim	0–2	ERC Ingolstadt	SAP Arena	Recap
No scoring		First period	03:25 – Wayne Simpson
No scoring		Second period	No scoring
No scoring		Third period	59:59 – Stefan Matteau
Arno Tiefensee (9 saves / 11 shots)		Goalie stats	Kevin Reich (27 saves / 27 shots)

Ingolstadt won series 4–2

=== Final ===
The final was played between 14 and 23 April 2023 in a best-of-seven mode.

14 April 2023	EHC Red Bull München	2–1	ERC Ingolstadt	Olympia Eishalle	Recap
Trevor Parkes – 01:33		First period	No scoring
Frederik Tiffels – 27:34		Second period	No scoring
No scoring		Third period	42:01 – Wojciech Stachowiak
Mathias Niederberger (28 saves / 29 shots)		Goalie stats	Kevin Reich (17 saves / 19 shots)

16 April 2023	ERC Ingolstadt	1–7	EHC Red Bull München	Saturn Arena	Recap
Maury Edwards – 00:35		First period	00:49 – Konrad Abeltshauser; 01:30 – Filip Varejcka; 02:21 – Maximilian Kastner; 09:34 – Konrad Abeltshauser
No scoring		Second period	28:58 – Austin Ortega (PP); 36:10 – Yasin Ehliz (PP)
No scoring		Third period	52:27 – Justin Schütz (SH)
Kevin Reich (26 saves / 33 shots)		Goalie stats	Mathias Niederberger (15 saves / 16 shots)

18 April 2023	EHC Red Bull München	3–4	ERC Ingolstadt	Olympia Eishalle	Recap
Ben Smith – 09:06; Justin Schütz – 19:31		First period	05:04 – Wojciech Stachowiak; 15:05 – Frederik Storm (PP)
Patrick Hager – 37:09		Second period	No scoring
No scoring		Third period	54:21 – Wojciech Stachowiak; 55:03 – Tye McGinn
Mathias Niederberger (23 saves / 27 shots)		Goalie stats	Jonas Stettmer (22 saves / 25 shots)

21 April 2023	ERC Ingolstadt	0–3	EHC Red Bull München	Saturn Arena	Recap
No scoring		First period	No scoring
No scoring		Second period	No scoring
No scoring		Third period	Ben Smith – 47:18; Ryan McKiernan (EN) – 59:05; Maximilian Kastner (EN) – 59:34
Jonas Stettmer (29 saves / 32 shots)		Goalie stats	Mathias Niederberger (15 saves / 15 shots)

23 April 2023	EHC Red Bull München	3–1	ERC Ingolstadt	Olympia Eishalle	Recap
Maximilian Kastner – 12:42		First period	06:12 – Ty Ronning
No scoring		Second period	No scoring
Andreas Eder (PP) – 51:53; Filip Varejcka (EN) – 58:25		Third period	No scoring
Mathias Niederberger (28 saves / 29 shots)		Goalie stats	Jonas Stettmer (24 saves / 27 shots)

Munich won series 4–1

== Statistics ==
=== Scoring leaders ===
List shows the top skaters sorted by points, then goals.

Player	Team	GP	G	A	Pts	+/−	PIM	POS
Andreas Thuresson	Kölner Haie	51	22	38	60	+28	26	F
Yasin Ehliz	EHC Red Bull München	56	21	39	60	+33	18	F
Carter Rowney	Löwen Frankfurt	55	21	37	58	+20	14	F
Louis-Marc Aubry	Kölner Haie	53	19	37	56	+26	45	F
Marcel Noebels	Eisbären Berlin	55	16	40	56	−4	12	F
Austin Ortega	EHC Red Bull München	56	27	28	55	+21	8	F
Spencer Machacek	Grizzlys Wolfsburg	55	27	28	55	0	21	F
Maximilian Kammerer	Kölner Haie	55	24	31	55	+27	10	F
Taylor Leier	Straubing Tigers	55	21	34	55	+22	23	F
Dustin Jeffrey	Grizzlys Wolfsburg	54	12	41	53	0	22	F

=== Leading goaltenders ===
Only the top five goaltenders, based on save percentage, who have played at least 40% of their team's minutes, are included in this list.

Player	Team	TOI	GA	GAA	SA	Sv%	SO
Joacim Eriksson	Schwenninger Wild Wings	2710	110	2.44	1457	92.5	4
Maximilian Franzreb	Fischtown Pinguins	1938	72	2.23	947	92.4	2
Dustin Strahlmeier	Grizzlys Wolfsburg	2352	91	2.32	1161	92.2	5
Henrik Haukeland	Düsseldorfer EG	3095	112	2.17	1397	92.0	3
Felix Brückmann	Adler Mannheim	2012	73	2.18	854	91.5	2

== Awards ==
The awards were announced on 11 March and the Finals MVP on 23 April 2023.

Award	Player
Player of the year	(Germany) Yasin Ehliz
Goaltender of the year	(Norway) Henrik Haukeland
Defenceman of the year	(Belarus) Nick Bailen
Rookie of the year	(Germany) Bennt Roßmy
Coach of the year	(Canada) Mark French
Finals MVP	(Germany) Maximilian Kastner
