= Alexander Barta =

German ice hockey player

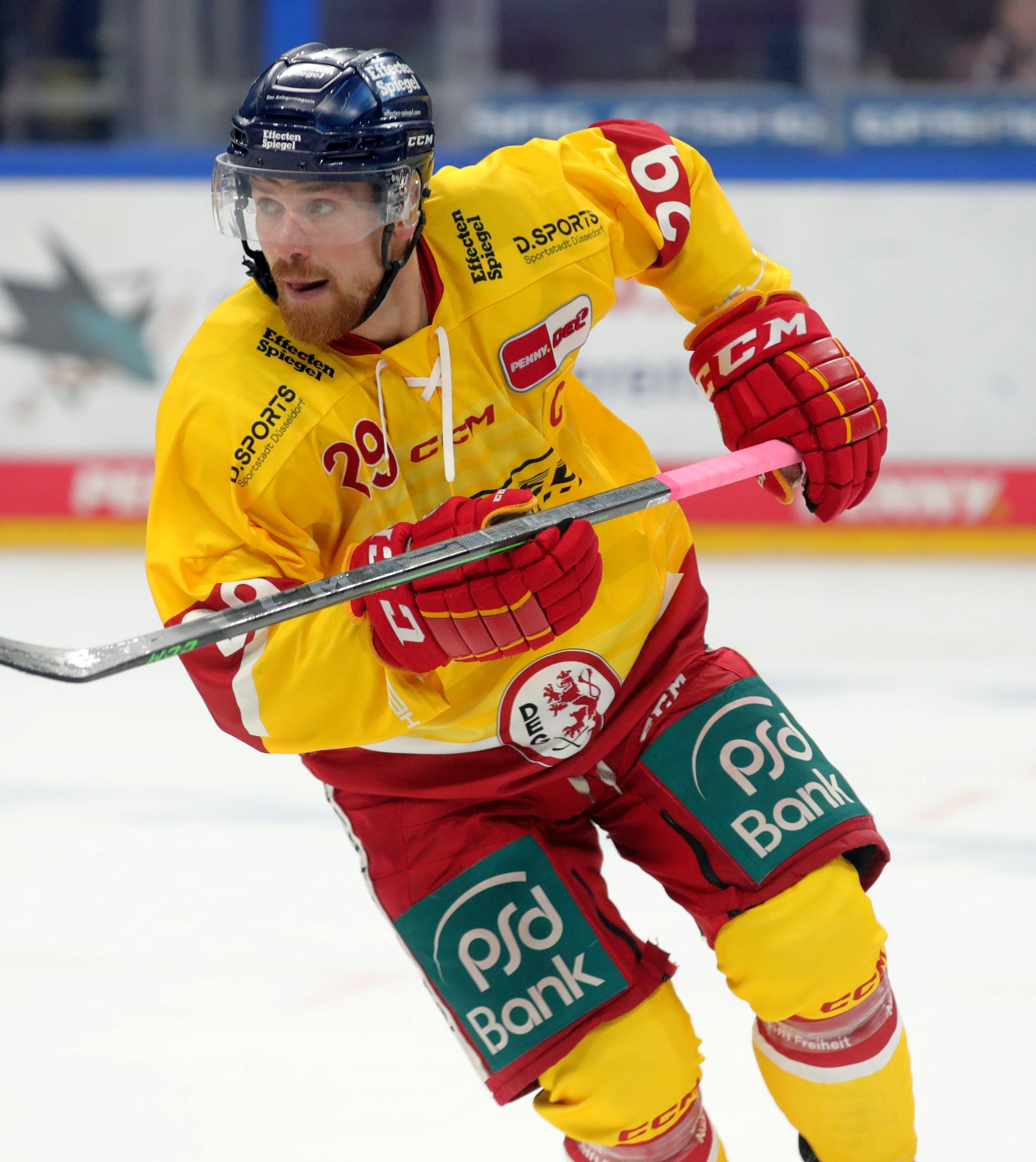
- Born: February 2, 1983 (age 42); East Berlin, East Germany
- Height: 5 ft 10 in (178 cm)
- Weight: 170 lb (77 kg; 12 st 2 lb)
- Position: Centre
- Shot: Right
- Played for: Eisbären Berlin; Hamburg Freezers; Rögle BK; EHC München; ERC Ingolstadt; Düsseldorfer EG
- National team: Germany
- NHL draft: Undrafted
- Playing career: 2000–2023

Alexander Barta (born February 2, 1983) is a German former professional ice hockey centre who most notably played 20 seasons in the Deutsche Eishockey Liga (DEL).

== Playing career ==
Between 2001 and 2005 he played four seasons with Eisbären Berlin in the Deutsche Eishockey Liga (DEL). He joined fellow DEL team Hamburg Freezers in 2005 and played six seasons with the club. Barta was selected to the DEL All-Star game in 2005, 2006, and 2007.

Barta was selected to play for the German national team for the 2010 Winter Olympics. He previously represented Germany at the 2003 World Junior Ice Hockey Championships, the 2005, 2006, 2007, 2009, 2010 and 2011 Ice Hockey World Championships, and the 2006 Winter Olympics.

Barta signed a one-year contract with Malmö Redhawks of the HockeyAllsvenskan on June 17, 2011.

Following a second Swedish season in 2012–13 with Rögle BK in the Elitserien, Barta returned to his native Germany, signing a two-year contract with EHC München of the DEL on May 6, 2013.

At the completion of his contract in Munich, Barta joined his older brother, Björn, in signing a one-year deal with ERC Ingolstadt on May 6, 2015. Following the 2015-16 season, he opted to put pen to paper on a three-year deal with fellow DEL side Düsseldorfer EG.

At the conclusion of in the 2022–23 campaign, his 23rd professional season and seventh with Düsseldorf, Barta announced his retirement from professional hockey, ending his illustrious DEL career by finishing 9th all-time in games played and 10th all-time in goals.

== Career statistics ==
=== Regular season and playoffs ===
| | | | Regular season | | | | | Playoffs |
| Season | Team | League | GP | G | A | Pts | PIM | GP | G | A | Pts | PIM |
|---|---|---|---|---|---|---|---|---|---|---|---|---|
| 1999–2000 | Eisbären Junior Berlin | DEU U18 |
| 2000–01 | Eisbären Junior Berlin | DEU.3 | 37 | 9 | 5 | 14 | 16 | — | — | — | — | — |
| 2000–01 | Eisbären Junior Berlin | DEU U18 | 19 | 22 | 11 | 33 | 30 | — | — | — | — | — |
| 2001–02 | Eisbären Junior Berlin | DEU.4 | 22 | 21 | 27 | 48 | 20 | — | — | — | — | — |
| 2001–02 | Eisbären Berlin | DEL | 13 | 0 | 0 | 0 | 0 | — | — | — | — | — |
| 2001–02 | EC Bad Nauheim | DEU.2 | 10 | 0 | 0 | 0 | 0 | — | — | — | — | — |
| 2002–03 | Eisbären Berlin | DEL | 43 | 3 | 7 | 10 | 6 | 9 | 0 | 0 | 0 | 2 |
| 2003–04 | Eisbären Berlin | DEL | 52 | 10 | 12 | 22 | 59 | 11 | 2 | 2 | 4 | 20 |
| 2004–05 | Eisbären Berlin | DEL | 52 | 9 | 7 | 16 | 36 | 11 | 2 | 1 | 3 | 8 |
| 2005–06 | Hamburg Freezers | DEL | 50 | 10 | 18 | 28 | 40 | 6 | 3 | 3 | 6 | 4 |
| 2006–07 | Hamburg Freezers | DEL | 52 | 17 | 28 | 45 | 44 | 7 | 1 | 3 | 4 | 2 |
| 2007–08 | Hamburg Freezers | DEL | 55 | 18 | 21 | 39 | 24 | 7 | 2 | 1 | 3 | 2 |
| 2008–09 | Hamburg Freezers | DEL | 16 | 7 | 17 | 24 | 6 | 9 | 2 | 2 | 4 | 2 |
| 2009–10 | Hamburg Freezers | DEL | 43 | 9 | 22 | 31 | 36 | — | — | — | — | — |
| 2010–11 | Hamburg Freezers | DEL | 43 | 8 | 16 | 24 | 24 | — | — | — | — | — |
| 2011–12 | Malmö Redhawks | Allsv | 52 | 11 | 13 | 24 | 14 | 6 | 1 | 1 | 2 | 4 |
| 2012–13 | Rögle BK | SEL | 55 | 11 | 17 | 28 | 41 | — | — | — | — | — |
| 2013–14 | EHC München | DEL | 51 | 18 | 31 | 49 | 12 | 3 | 1 | 1 | 2 | 0 |
| 2014–15 | EHC München | DEL | 52 | 13 | 16 | 29 | 22 | 4 | 0 | 0 | 0 | 2 |
| 2015–16 | ERC Ingolstadt | DEL | 52 | 11 | 17 | 28 | 30 | 2 | 0 | 2 | 2 | 0 |
| 2016–17 | Düsseldorfer EG | DEL | 44 | 7 | 5 | 12 | 18 | — | — | — | — | — |
| 2017–18 | Düsseldorfer EG | DEL | 52 | 25 | 15 | 40 | 22 | — | — | — | — | — |
| 2018–19 | Düsseldorfer EG | DEL | 49 | 15 | 31 | 46 | 26 | 7 | 3 | 7 | 10 | 6 |
| 2019–20 | Düsseldorfer EG | DEL | 51 | 9 | 25 | 34 | 20 | — | — | — | — | — |
| 2020–21 | Düsseldorfer EG | DEL | 38 | 12 | 17 | 29 | 10 | — | — | — | — | — |
| 2021–22 | Düsseldorfer EG | DEL | 56 | 11 | 23 | 34 | 22 | 7 | 4 | 0 | 4 | 8 |
| 2022–23 | Düsseldorfer EG | DEL | 56 | 5 | 9 | 14 | 24 | 7 | 4 | 5 | 9 | 0 |
| DEL totals | | | 920 | 217 | 337 | 554 | 481 | 90 | 24 | 27 | 51 | 56 |

=== International ===
| Year | Team | Event | GP | G | A | Pts | PIM |
|---|---|---|---|---|---|---|---|
| 2000 | Germany | U17 | | 0 | 4 | 4 |
| 2003 | Germany | WJC | 6 | 0 | 1 | 1 | 4 |
| 2005 | Germany | WC | 6 | 1 | 1 | 2 | 2 |
| 2006 | Germany | OG | 5 | 0 | 0 | 0 | 4 |
| 2006 | Germany | WC D1 | 5 | 3 | 0 | 3 | 4 |
| 2007 | Germany | WC | 6 | 2 | 0 | 2 | 4 |
| 2009 | Germany | OGQ | 3 | 0 | 2 | 2 | 0 |
| 2009 | Germany | WC | 6 | 0 | 0 | 0 | 0 |
| 2010 | Germany | WC | 9 | 3 | 1 | 4 | 0 |
| 2011 | Germany | WC | 7 | 2 | 1 | 3 | 0 |
| 2012 | Germany | WC | 7 | 0 | 0 | 0 | 0 |
| 2013 | Germany | OGQ | 3 | 2 | 4 | 6 | 0 |
| 2014 | Germany | WC | 7 | 1 | 0 | 1 | 2 |
| Junior totals | | | 6 | 0 | 1 | 1 | 4 |
| Senior totals | | | 64 | 14 | 9 | 23 | 18 |
