= Dylan Wruck =

Canadian-German ice hockey player

- Born: September 23, 1992 (age 33) Saskatoon, Saskatchewan, Canada
- Height: 5 ft 9 in (175 cm)
- Weight: 175 lb (79 kg; 12 st 7 lb)
- Position: Forward
- Shoots: Left
- Oberliga team Former teams: Hannover Scorpions; Ontario Reign; Iserlohn Roosters; Kölner Haie; Straubing Tigers; Löwen Frankfurt
- NHL draft: Undrafted
- Playing career: 2013–present

Dylan Wruck (born September 23, 1992) is a German-Canadian professional ice hockey forward. Wruck is currently playing under contract with the Hannover Scorpions of the Oberliga.

== Playing career ==
Dylan Wruck was SMHAAAL leading scorer in 2008–09 while playing for the Beardy's Blackhawks, where he was named league's Most Valuable Player. While playing for Beardy's, he attended the Mac's Tournament and was a Mac's Tournament Allstar. Wruck participated in the 2009 U17 World Tournament in Port Alberni, BC, with Team West for the tournament he had 2 goals and 2 assists. Team West which placed fourth, losing to Team USA in the bronze medal game, also behind Team Ontario and Team Pacific who won Gold and Silver consecutively. Wruck named Player of the Game and of the Day against Slovakia in the 2009 U-17 World Tournament. Wruck also won a Saskatchewan Pee Wee Provincial AA Championship in 2003–04.

Wruck spent four years with the Edmonton Oil Kings of the WHL, seeing action in a total of 259 games, in which he tallied 87 goals and 169 assists. A consistent two-way player, he put up 80 plus points in each of his last three seasons with the Oil Kings and was a plus 83 during this time. His team was the best team in 2011–12 winning the Scotty Munro Memorial Trophy with 107 points for the year, during the regular season. Wruck was able to confirm his good performance from the previous year and scored 80 plus points. Wruck helped the Oilkings to win the 2011-2012 WHL Championship, the Ed Chynoweth Cup, and went on to the Memorial Cup. A year later, the Oil Kings again reached the finals, but they lost to the Portland Winterhawks. In 2012–13, he won the Brad Hornung Award as the WHL Most Sportsmanlike Player of the Year. Wruck scored 104 points in 90 games in his last junior season with the Oil Kings.

In his second game as a professional, Wruck scored a hat trick during the 2013–14 season with ECHL's Ontario Reign, but his season was cut short by a shoulder injury. Wruck played only three games for the Ontario team in which he contributed 4 goals and 2 assists. On 16 January 2015, while playing for the Iserlohn Rooster of the DEL he recorded six points in the game against Düsseldorfer EG.

He took up an offer from the Iserlohn Roosters of the German elite league Deutsche Eishockey Liga (DEL) in 2014 and had 14 goals as well as 23 assists in 51 games of the 2014–15 campaign. Which was tops for a rookie that year. Wruck was named DEL Rookie of the Year in the 2013-14 Season. In March 2015, he put pen to paper on a new two-year deal with the Roosters. In October 2015, Wruck sustained a shoulder injury which kept him out for months. He spent parts of his rehab in his native Canada, before returning to Iserlohn. In the 2016–17 season, Wruck tallied eight goals and 16 assists in 52 DEL contests. He left Iserlohn after the conclusion of the season and inked a deal with fellow DEL side Kölner Haie on May 23, 2017.

After recording just 2 assists in 35 regular season games in the 2017–18 season, Wruck left Kölner Haie and agreed to a one-year contract with his third DEL club, the Straubing Tigers, on May 2, 2018. In the 2018–19 season, Wruck compiled just 10 points in 39 games for the Tigers before leaving as a free agent at the conclusion of the season.

On June 14, 2019, Wruck continued in Germany, securing a one-year contract with DEL2 club, Heilbronner Falken. Wruck became the 2019–20 DEL2 regular season top scorer with 24 goals and 64 assists.

In his return to the DEL in 2022–23 season, after helping Löwen Frankfurt gain promotion from the DEL2 in his first season with the club, Wruck posted 6 goals and 28 points through 54 regular season games. Following their defeat in the playoff qualifiers to Düsseldorfer EG, Wruck left Frankfurt at the conclusion of his contract on March 19, 2023.

On June 24, 2023, Wruck extended his professional career in Germany by agreeing to a one-year contract with third tier club, Hannover Scorpions of the Oberliga.

== Career statistics ==
=== Regular season and playoffs ===
			Regular season					Playoffs
Season	Team	League	GP	G	A	Pts	PIM	GP	G	A	Pts	PIM
2008–09	Beardy's Blackhawks	SMHL	44	31	63	94	42	—	—	—	—	—
2008–09	Edmonton Oil Kings	WHL	1	1	0	1	0	—	—	—	—	—
2009–10	Edmonton Oil Kings	WHL	53	5	7	12	14	—	—	—	—	—
2010–11	Edmonton Oil Kings	WHL	71	38	40	78	44	4	0	2	2	2
2011–12	Edmonton Oil Kings	WHL	66	21	59	80	17	8	1	3	4	0
2012–13	Edmonton Oil Kings	WHL	68	22	63	85	14	22	2	17	19	2
2013–14	Ontario Reign	ECHL	3	4	2	6	0	—	—	—	—	—
2014–15	Iserlohn Roosters	DEL	51	14	23	37	39	7	1	4	5	0
2015–16	Iserlohn Roosters	DEL	9	2	7	9	2	—	—	—	—	—
2016–17	Iserlohn Roosters	DEL	52	8	16	24	16	—	—	—	—	—
2017–18	Kölner Haie	DEL	35	0	2	2	0	5	0	0	0	0
2018–19	Straubing Tigers	DEL	38	1	9	10	8	1	0	0	0	0
2019–20	Heilbronner Falken	DEL2	51	24	64	88	12	—	—	—	—	—
2020–21	Heilbronner Falken	DEL2	49	23	55	78	24	3	3	3	6	2
2021–22	Löwen Frankfurt	DEL2	52	20	40	60	18	12	4	13	17	6
2022–23	Löwen Frankfurt	DEL	54	6	22	28	14	2	1	0	1	0
DEL totals			239	31	79	110	79	15	2	4	6	0

=== International ===
Year	Team	Event	Result	GP	G	A	Pts	PIM
2009	Canada West	U17	4th	5	2	2	4	0
Junior totals				5	2	2	4	0

== Awards and honours ==
Award	Year
SMHL
MVP	2009
WHL
Brad Hornung Trophy	2013
DEL
Rookie of the Year	2015
DEL2
Regular Season Top Scorer	2020
