= Andreas Eder =

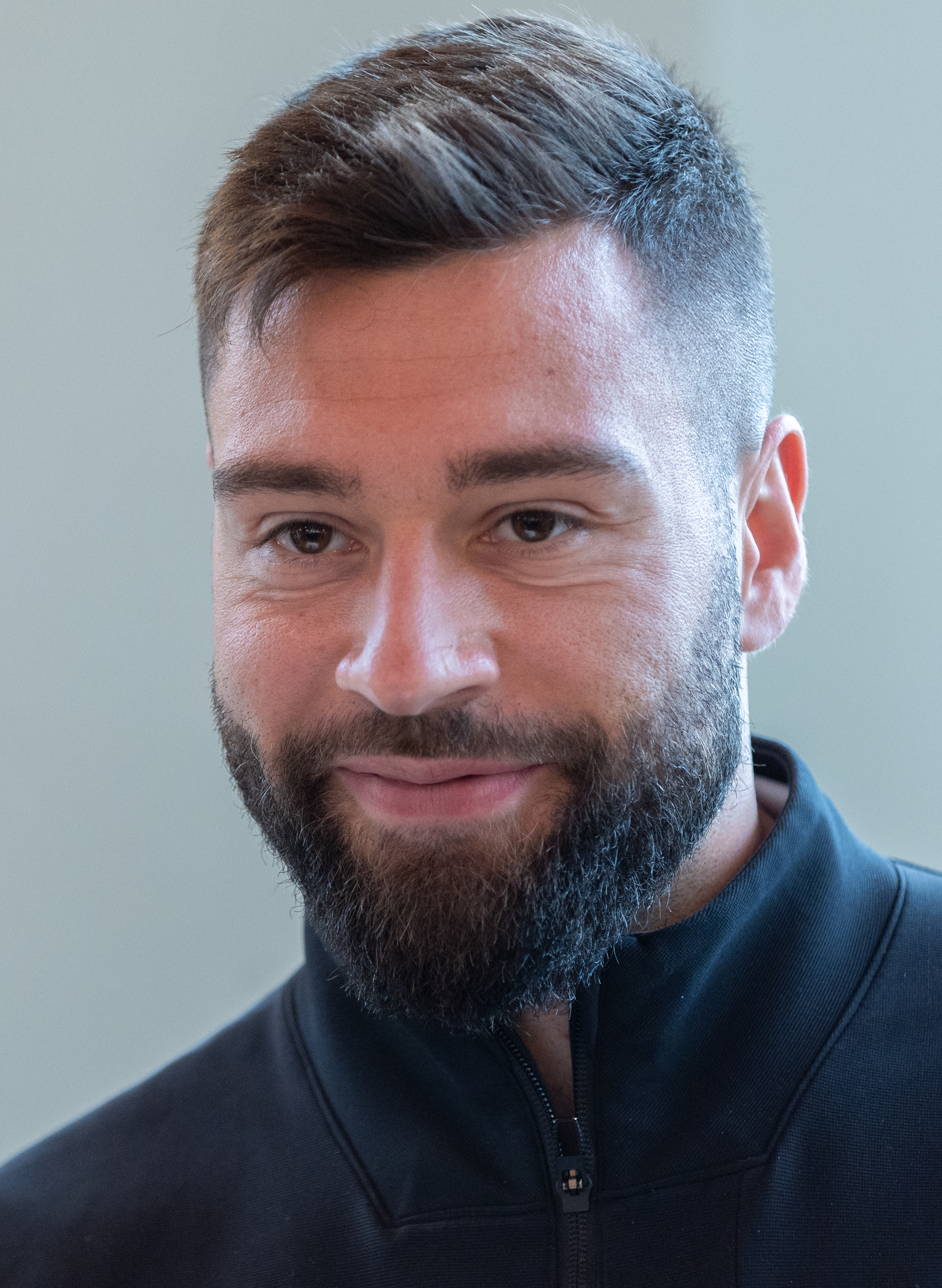
- Eder with Germany in 2026
- Born: 20 March 1996 (age 30) Tegernsee, Germany
- Height: 1.89 m (6 ft 2 in)
- Weight: 91 kg (201 lb; 14 st 5 lb)
- Position: Forward
- Shoots: Right
- DEL team Former teams: Eisbären Berlin; EHC München; Nürnberg Ice Tigers; Straubing Tigers; EV Zug
- National team: Germany
- NHL draft: Undrafted
- Playing career: 2013–present

Andreas Eder (born 20 March 1996) is a German professional ice hockey player who is a forward for Eisbären Berlin of the Deutsche Eishockey Liga (DEL).

He represented Germany national team at the 2021 IIHF World Championship.
