= Patrick Hager =

German ice hockey player (born 1988)

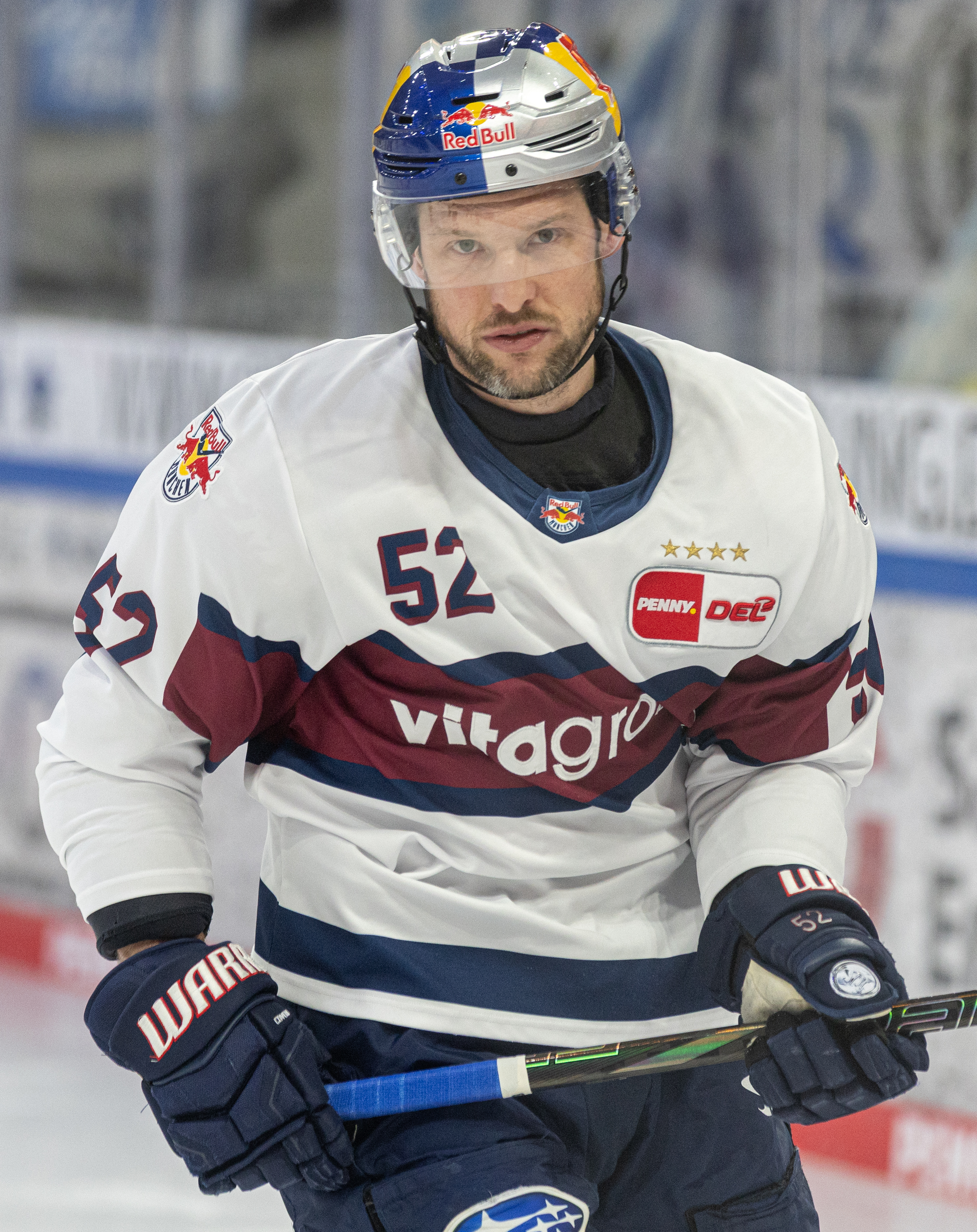
- Patrick Hager, November 2025
- Born: 8 September 1988 (age 38) Stuttgart, West Germany
- Height: 1.78 m (5 ft 10 in)
- Weight: 80 kg (176 lb; 12 st 8 lb)
- Position: Left wing
- Shoots: Left
- DEL team Former teams: EHC München; Krefeld Pinguine; ERC Ingolstadt; Kölner Haie
- National team: Germany
- Playing career: 2005–present

Patrick Hager (born 8 September 1988) is a German professional ice hockey player who currently plays for EHC Red Bull München of the Deutsche Eishockey Liga (DEL).

== Playing career ==
He previously played with the Krefeld Pinguine and ERC Ingolstadt. He joined Kölner Haie as a free agent, signing a two-year contract on 5 November 2014.

At the conclusion of his contract with Kölner Haie, Hager left to sign as a free agent with his fourth DEL club, EHC München, on a one-year deal on 31 May 2017.

== International play ==
He participated at the 2010 IIHF World Championship as a member of the German National men's ice hockey team. He also represented Germany at the 2018 IIHF World Championship and the 2018 Winter Olympics.

== Career statistics ==
=== Regular season and playoffs ===
			Regular season					Playoffs
Season	Team	League	GP	G	A	Pts	PIM	GP	G	A	Pts	PIM
2003–04	Starbulls Rosenheim	DNL	32	4	11	15	28	—	—	—	—	—
2004–05	Starbulls Rosenheim	DNL	32	15	18	33	146	2	0	0	0	4
2004–05	Starbulls Rosenheim	GER.3	1	0	1	1	0	—	—	—	—	—
2005–06	Starbulls Rosenheim	DNL	25	20	20	40	101	7	6	8	14	8
2005–06	Starbulls Rosenheim	GER.3	13	2	3	5	10	1	0	0	0	2
2006–07	Starbulls Rosenheim	GER.3	47	16	14	30	94	3	3	2	5	16
2007–08	Krefeld Pinguine	DEL	52	9	7	16	52	—	—	—	—	—
2007–08	Starbulls Rosenheim	GER.3	1	0	0	0	2	—	—	—	—	—
2008–09	Krefeld Pinguine	DEL	51	15	10	25	68	7	1	0	1	16
2009–10	Krefeld Pinguine	DEL	42	12	16	28	70	—	—	—	—	—
2010–11	Krefeld Pinguine	DEL	51	11	9	20	56	—	—	—	—	—
2011–12	Krefeld Pinguine	DEL	47	12	12	24	108	—	—	—	—	—
2012–13	ERC Ingolstadt	DEL	52	9	20	29	60	6	1	1	2	26
2013–14	ERC Ingolstadt	DEL	46	5	14	19	75	21	2	6	2	28
2014–15	ERC Ingolstadt	DEL	50	17	19	36	44	18	5	4	9	24
2015–16	Kölner Haie	DEL	50	14	30	44	69	15	7	11	18	16
2016–17	Kölner Haie	DEL	47	14	28	42	100	4	0	2	2	0
2017–18	EHC München	DEL	50	15	12	27	32	17	6	7	13	18
2018–19	EHC München	DEL	37	6	14	20	82	18	4	6	10	41
2019–20	EHC München	DEL	41	9	18	27	26	—	—	—	—	—
2020–21	EHC München	DEL	28	5	14	19	18	—	—	—	—	—
2021–22	EHC München	DEL	48	4	19	23	65	11	5	3	8	19
2022–23	EHC München	DEL	51	16	21	37	22	18	6	5	11	21
2023–24	EHC München	DEL	51	7	25	32	43	9	4	4	8	10
2024–25	EHC München	DEL	42	3	14	17	18	6	0	2	2	2
2025–26	EHC München	DEL	52	13	19	32	24	10	2	2	4	14
DEL totals			888	196	321	517	1,032	160	43	53	96	235

=== International ===
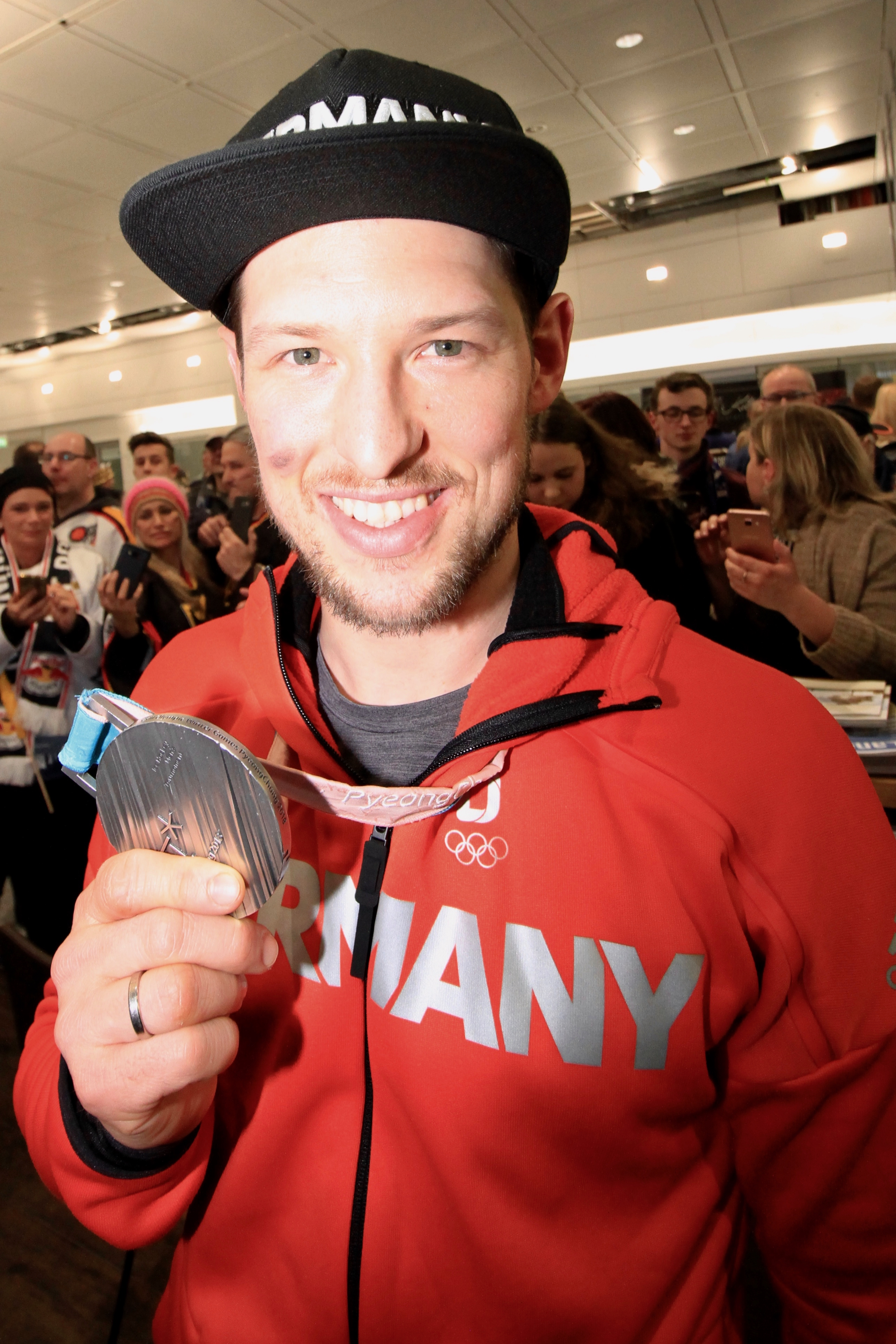

Medal record

Representing Germany

Ice hockey

Olympic Games
Silver medal – second place	2018 Pyeongchang	

Year	Team	Event	GP	G	A	Pts	PIM
2005	Germany	U17	5	2	0	2	4
2006	Germany	WJC18	6	1	2	3	6
2008	Germany	WJC D1	5	5	7	12	2
2009	Germany	WC	5	0	1	1	2
2010	Germany	WC	7	0	0	0	8
2013	Germany	WC	6	1	0	1	6
2015	Germany	WC	7	0	2	2	14
2016	Germany	OGQ	3	1	3	4	0
2016	Germany	WC	8	3	4	7	6
2017	Germany	WC	6	2	1	3	27
2018	Germany	OG	7	3	4	7	4
2018	Germany	WC	7	3	1	4	2
2019	Germany	WC	8	0	1	1	22
2022	Germany	OG	4	1	0	1	0
2025	Germany	WC	5	0	1	1	8
Junior totals			16	8	9	17	12
Senior totals			74	14	18	32	99
