= Andreas Thuresson =

Swedish professional ice hockey player (born 1987)

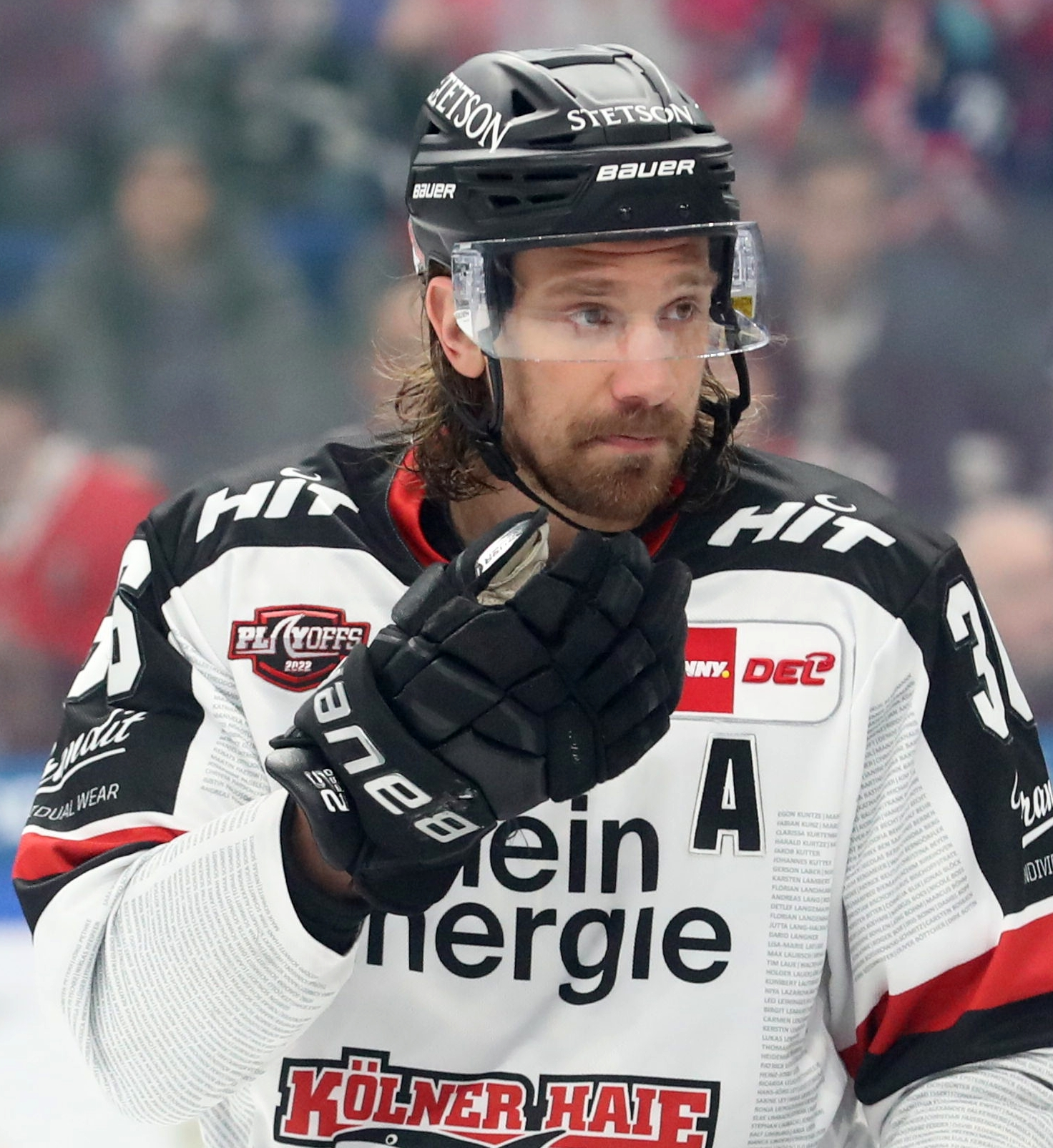
- Born: November 18, 1987 (age 38) Kristianstad, Sweden
- Height: 6 ft 1 in (185 cm)
- Weight: 203 lb (92 kg; 14 st 7 lb)
- Position: Centre
- Shot: Right
- DEL team Former teams: Kölner Haie; Malmö Redhawks; Nashville Predators; Brynäs IF; HC Sibir Novosibirsk; Severstal Cherepovets; Kunlun Red Star; SCL Tigers; HV71; Schwenninger Wild Wings
- National team: Sweden
- NHL draft: 144th overall, 2007; Nashville Predators
- Playing career: 2006–2024

Patrick Andreas Thuresson (born November 18, 1987) is a Swedish professional ice hockey player currently playing with Kölner Haie of the Deutsche Eishockey Liga (DEL).

== Playing career ==
Thuresson was drafted by the Nashville Predators in the fifth round of the 2007 NHL entry draft, 144th overall. Andreas scored his first NHL goal on December 31, 2009 against Mathieu Garon of the Columbus Blue Jackets.

On July 2, 2011, he was traded to the New York Rangers for Brodie Dupont. Thuresson was assigned to the Rangers AHL affiliate, the Connecticut Whale, for the duration of the 2011–12 season. After scoring only 21 points in 73 games at season's end, Thuresson returned to his native Sweden signing a one-year contract with Brynäs IF of the Elitserien on May 18, 2012.

In a second stint with the Redhaws, Thuresson played two seasons with the club before leaving as a free agent to sign a one-year deal with Chinese club, Kunlun Red Star of the Kontinental Hockey League (KHL) on June 5, 2017.

After returning to Sweden for the 2018–19 season with HV71, Thuresson again opted to move abroad at the conclusion of his contract in signing a new two-year deal with German club, Schwenninger Wild Wings of the DEL on April 22, 2019.

Thuresson played with the Wild Wings for two seasons before moving to fellow DEL club, Kölner Haie, on a one-year contract on 12 May 2021.

== Personal ==
Thuresson was married to Morgan Jaye Zabrowski on March 21, 2015.

== Career statistics ==
=== Regular season and playoffs ===
			Regular season					Playoffs
Season	Team	League	GP	G	A	Pts	PIM	GP	G	A	Pts	PIM
2003–04	Malmö Redhawks	J18 Allsv	3	0	0	0	4	—	—	—	—	—
2003–04	Malmö Redhawks	J20	19	2	2	4	16	8	0	0	0	6
2003–04	Tyringe SoSS	SWE.3	12	0	1	1	0	—	—	—	—	—
2004–05	Malmö Redhawks	J18 Allsv	3	1	1	2	4	—	—	—	—	—
2004–05	Malmö Redhawks	J20	30	4	4	8	28	3	2	1	3	2
2005–06	Malmö Redhawks	J18 Allsv	2	1	0	1	4	—	—	—	—	—
2005–06	Malmö Redhawks	J20	38	15	18	33	71	—	—	—	—	—
2005–06	Malmö Redhawks	Allsv	19	0	2	2	10	1	0	0	0	0
2006–07	Malmö Redhawks	SEL	48	10	5	15	26	—	—	—	—	—
2007–08	Milwaukee Admirals	AHL	77	11	7	18	37	6	0	0	0	4
2008–09	Milwaukee Admirals	AHL	74	14	15	29	32	11	3	1	4	4
2009–10	Milwaukee Admirals	AHL	50	14	19	33	24	7	2	7	9	16
2009–10	Nashville Predators	NHL	22	1	2	3	4	—	—	—	—	—
2010–11	Milwaukee Admirals	AHL	76	14	24	38	41	13	3	3	6	10
2010–11	Nashville Predators	NHL	3	0	0	0	2	—	—	—	—	—
2011–12	Connecticut Whale	AHL	73	13	8	21	40	9	1	2	3	0
2012–13	Brynäs IF	SEL	48	11	8	19	50	4	0	1	1	12
2013–14	Brynäs IF	SHL	52	17	20	37	61	4	0	2	2	4
2014–15	Sibir Novosibirsk	KHL	21	8	7	15	10	—	—	—	—	—
2014–15	Severstal Cherepovets	KHL	26	7	3	10	16	—	—	—	—	—
2015–16	Malmö Redhawks	SHL	42	14	10	24	55	—	—	—	—	—
2016–17	Malmö Redhawks	SHL	51	12	21	33	18	10	4	1	5	4
2017–18	Kunlun Red Star	KHL	29	1	3	4	10	—	—	—	—	—
2017–18	SCL Tigers	NL	22	7	6	13	12	—	—	—	—	—
2018–19	HV71	SHL	43	10	9	19	26	9	1	3	4	8
2019–20	Schwenninger Wild Wings	DEL	28	10	9	19	16	—	—	—	—	—
2020–21	Schwenninger Wild Wings	DEL	38	17	20	37	26	—	—	—	—	—
2021–22	Kölner Haie	DEL	50	16	18	34	26	5	1	3	4	4
2022–23	Kölner Haie	DEL	51	22	38	60	26	6	2	1	3	6
2023–24	Kölner Haie	DEL	28	12	10	22	28	—	—	—	—	—
SHL totals			284	74	73	147	236	37	7	9	16	30
AHL totals			350	66	73	139	174	46	9	13	22	34
NHL totals			25	1	2	3	6	—	—	—	—	—

=== International ===
Year	Team	Event	Result	GP	G	A	Pts	PIM
2004	Sweden	U18	3rd place, bronze medalist(s)	5	0	1	1	6
2007	Sweden	WJC	4th	7	1	2	3	4
2015	Sweden	WC	5th	1	0	0	0	0
Junior totals				12	1	3	4	10
Senior totals				1	0	0	0	0
