= Trevor Parkes =

Canadian ice hockey player

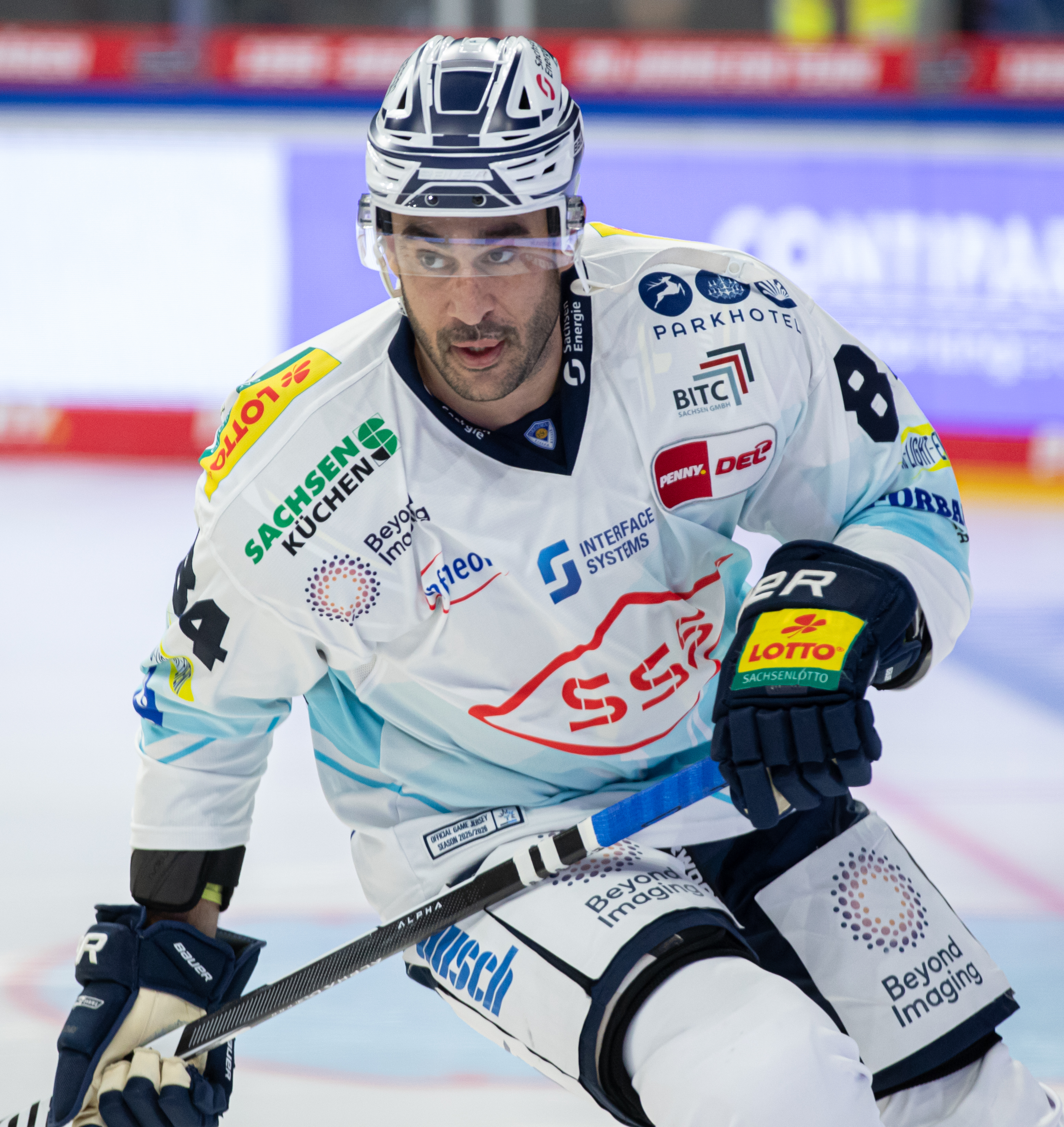
- Parkes with Dresdner Eislöwen in 2025
- Born: May 13, 1991 (age 35) Fort Erie, Ontario, Canada
- Height: 6 ft 2 in (188 cm)
- Weight: 215 lb (98 kg; 15 st 5 lb)
- Position: Right wing
- Shoots: Right
- DEL team Former teams: EHC München; San Jose Barracuda; Augsburger Panther
- NHL draft: Undrafted
- Playing career: 2011–present

Trevor Parkes (born May 13, 1991) is a Canadian professional ice hockey player for EHC Red Bull München of the Deutsche Eishockey Liga (DEL).

== Playing career ==
=== Junior ===
During the 2009–10 QMJHL season, Parkes played for Montreal in the QMJHL as an 18-year-old rookie. In 66 games with the Montreal Juniors he recorded 27 goals and 20 assists. Seven of Parkes' goals came on the power play. The Juniors reached the playoffs after finishing second in their division and in the seven-game, first-round series with Gatineau he recorded six goals and one assist.

During the 2010–11 QMJHL season, Parkes played in 60 games and finished the season with 33 goals and 29 assists. Parkes added six goals and two assists during Montreal's 10 game playoff stint.

=== Professional ===
On September 23, 2010, the Detroit Red Wings signed Parkes to a three-year entry-level contract.

Parkes made his professional debut for the Grand Rapids Griffins during the 2011–12 AHL season. Parkes played in 44 games with Grand Rapids, where he recorded two goals and six assists.

During the 2012–13 AHL season, Parkes played in 36 regular season games for AHL Calder Cup champion Grand Rapids in his second pro season and was one of the top scorers for the ECHL's Toledo Walleye. Parkes recorded three goals and six assists in 36 games with the Griffins. He did not play for Grand Rapids in the AHL playoffs. Parkes recorded 14 goals and 16 assists in 19 regular season games for Toledo. He was tied for second in scoring for the Walleye in their playoff series with Cincinnati — scoring three goals and 2 assists in six games.

Following the 2013-14 season, the Red Wings did not extend a qualifying offer to Parkes, resulting in him becoming an unrestricted free agent. On September 5, 2014, the Greenville Road Warriors of the ECHL announced that he had signed with the team. After 7 games with the Warriors, Parkes was traded to the Utah Grizzlies in exchange for Charles-Olivier Roussel on November 7, 2014 but returned to Greenville prior to playing any games with Utah. On February 3, 2015, Parkes was loaned to the Worcester Sharks of the AHL and after three games the Sharks signed him to a Standard Player Contract.

On July 16, 2015, Parkes followed the San Jose Sharks affiliate relocation, in signing a one-year AHL contract with the San Jose Barracuda.

On September 1, 2016 it was announced that Parkes would follow his former teammates Mark Cundari and Evan Trupp to Europe to play his first season in Germany with Augsburger Panther of the Deutsche Eishockey Liga (DEL). After his second season with Augsburger in 2017–18, Parkes opted to leave the club as a free agent and sign a one-year contract with rival DEL participant, EHC Red Bull München on May 2, 2018.

== Career statistics ==
			Regular season					Playoffs
Season	Team	League	GP	G	A	Pts	PIM	GP	G	A	Pts	PIM
2009–10	Montreal Juniors	QMJHL	66	27	20	47	34	7	6	1	7	4
2010–11	Montreal Juniors	QMJHL	60	33	29	62	32	10	6	2	8	12
2011–12	Toledo Walleye	ECHL	4	4	0	4	2	—	—	—	—	—
2011–12	Grand Rapids Griffins	AHL	44	2	6	8	23	—	—	—	—	—
2012–13	Toledo Walleye	ECHL	19	14	16	30	6	—	—	—	—	—
2012–13	Grand Rapids Griffins	AHL	36	3	6	9	35	—	—	—	—	—
2013–14	Toledo Walleye	ECHL	27	17	17	34	20	—	—	—	—	—
2013–14	Grand Rapids Griffins	AHL	36	6	3	9	27	3	1	0	1	12
2014–15	Greenville Road Warriors	ECHL	39	15	18	33	24	—	—	—	—	—
2014–15	Worcester Sharks	AHL	20	3	6	9	14	—	—	—	—	—
2015–16	San Jose Barracuda	AHL	68	18	23	41	73	4	0	0	0	19
2016–17	Augsburger Panther	DEL	51	22	22	44	77	7	3	3	6	12
2017–18	Augsburger Panther	DEL	48	22	14	36	65	—	—	—	—	—
2018–19	EHC München	DEL	41	12	18	30	28	18	2	5	7	41
2019–20	EHC München	DEL	52	28	18	46	24	—	—	—	—	—
2020–21	EHC München	DEL	38	23	18	41	16	2	0	4	4	0
2021–22	EHC München	DEL	55	25	25	50	26	11	3	2	5	6
2022–23	EHC München	DEL	36	10	9	19	22	18	5	5	10	10
2023–24	EHC München	DEL	52	16	14	30	26	9	4	1	5	4
AHL totals			204	32	44	76	172	7	1	0	1	31
DEL totals			373	158	138	296	284	65	17	20	37	73
