= Yasin Ehliz =

German ice hockey player (born 1992)

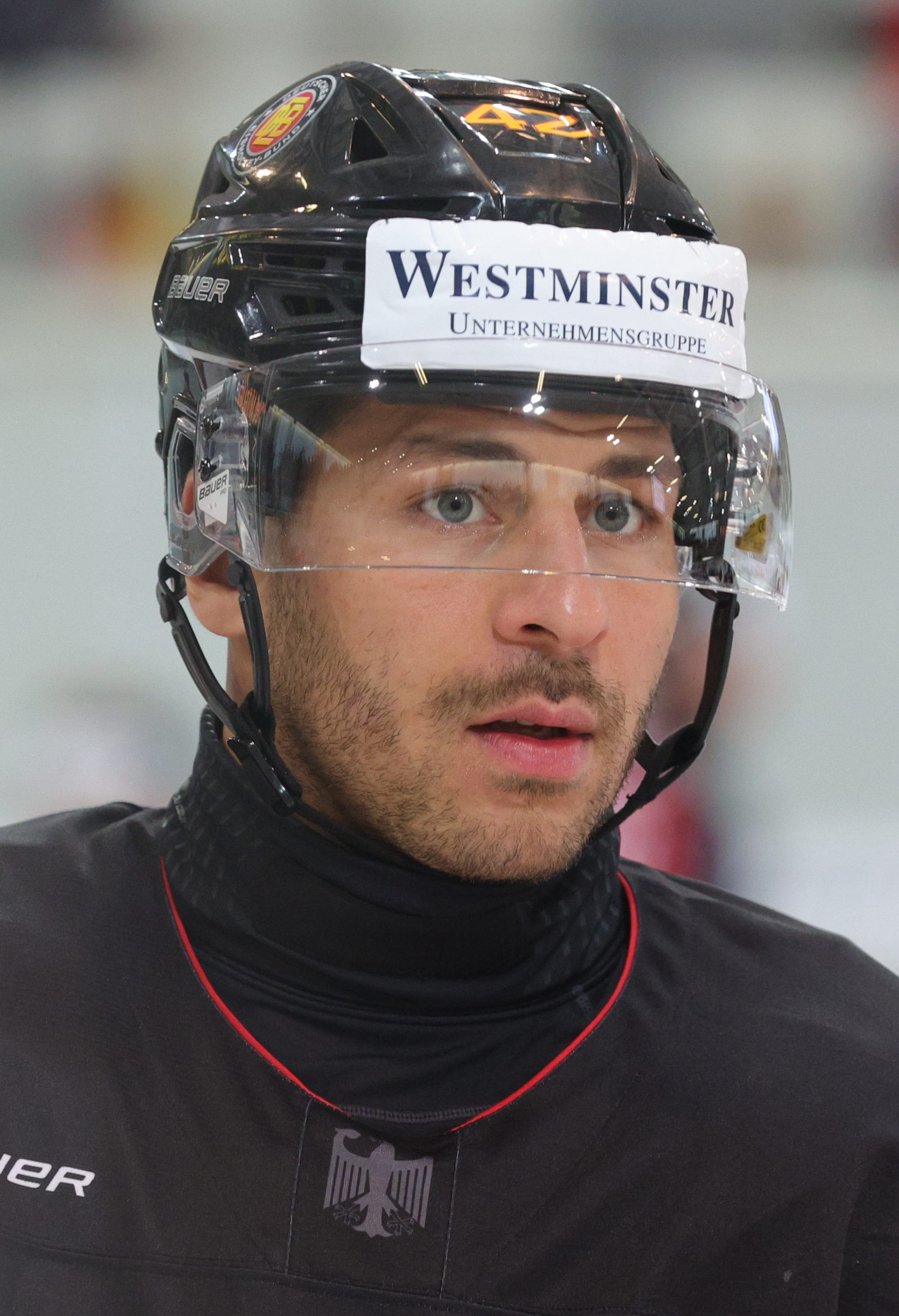
- Yasin Ehliz (2024)
- Born: 30 December 1992 (age 33) Bad Tölz, Germany
- Height: 5 ft 10 in (178 cm)
- Weight: 185 lb (84 kg; 13 st 3 lb)
- Position: Right wing
- Shoots: Left
- DEL team Former teams: EHC München; Thomas Sabo Ice Tigers
- National team: Germany
- NHL draft: Undrafted
- Playing career: 2010–present

Yasin Ehliz (born 30 December 1992) is a German professional ice hockey player who is a right winger for EHC Red Bull München of the Deutsche Eishockey Liga (DEL).

== Playing career ==
A product of Tölzer Löwen, Ehliz moved to the Thomas Sabo Ice Tigers of the German Deutsche Eishockey Liga (DEL) in 2010. He played for the Ice Tigers in the DEL until 2018 before on 11 June 2018, he signed a one-year, two-way contract with the Calgary Flames of the National Hockey League (NHL). For Calgary's AHL affiliate, the Stockton Heat, he appeared in four games in the early stages of the 2018–19 season. In early November 2018, he was placed on unconditional waivers. He subsequently returned to Germany, and signed with Red Bull München on 7 November 2018.

== International play ==
Ehliz was named to the Germany national team for the 2014 World Championship. He won a silver medal with Germany at the 2018 Winter Olympics, and also represented Germany at the 2018 World Championship.

== Career statistics ==
=== Regular season and playoffs ===
			Regular season					Playoffs
Season	Team	League	GP	G	A	Pts	PIM	GP	G	A	Pts	PIM
2007–08	Tölzer Löwen	DNL	29	6	13	19	28	8	1	1	2	8
2008–09	Tölzer Löwen	DNL	34	18	23	41	56	4	1	2	3	2
2009–10	Tölzer Löwen	DNL	26	9	24	33	48	4	3	3	6	6
2009–10	Tölzer Löwen	3.GBun	23	5	3	8	20	—	—	—	—	—
2010–11	Thomas Sabo Ice Tigers	DEL	18	0	0	0	6	—	—	—	—	—
2010–11	Tölzer Löwen	3.GBun	30	13	23	36	68	13	4	9	13	18
2010–11	Tölzer Löwen	DNL	—	—	—	—	—	1	0	0	0	0
2011–12	Thomas Sabo Ice Tigers	DEL	35	4	5	9	49	—	—	—	—	—
2011–12	Tölzer Löwen	3.GBun	14	5	14	19	43	14	2	11	13	16
2012–13	Thomas Sabo Ice Tigers	DEL	47	13	12	25	43	3	0	2	2	4
2013–14	Thomas Sabo Ice Tigers	DEL	52	17	20	37	46	6	1	1	2	6
2014–15	Thomas Sabo Ice Tigers	DEL	48	11	34	45	32	8	2	5	7	33
2015–16	Thomas Sabo Ice Tigers	DEL	36	7	21	28	18	11	2	4	6	12
2016–17	Thomas Sabo Ice Tigers	DEL	51	16	32	48	32	13	5	7	12	12
2017–18	Thomas Sabo Ice Tigers	DEL	46	10	21	31	47	12	5	1	6	6
2018–19	Stockton Heat	AHL	4	0	0	0	2	—	—	—	—	—
2018–19	EHC München	DEL	35	10	5	15	38	18	3	7	10	12
2019–20	EHC München	DEL	51	22	18	40	30	—	—	—	—	—
2020–21	EHC München	DEL	38	19	18	37	28	2	1	0	1	0
2021–22	EHC München	DEL	45	11	22	33	12	11	3	7	10	14
2022–23	EHC München	DEL	56	21	39	60	18	18	7	4	11	10
2023–24	EHC München	DEL	46	14	18	32	18	9	0	4	4	2
2024–25	EHC München	DEL	49	19	16	35	14	6	1	2	3	9
2025–26	EHC München	DEL	52	14	24	38	16	11	4	5	9	19
DEL totals			705	208	305	513	447	128	34	49	83	139

Medal record

Representing Germany

Ice hockey

Olympic Games
Silver medal – second place	2018 Pyeongchang	

=== International ===
Year	Team	Event	Result	GP	G	A	Pts	PIM
2009	Germany	U17	6th	5	1	4	5	0
2010	Germany	WJC18 D1	11th	5	3	5	8	2
2014	Germany	WC	14th	3	0	0	0	2
2015	Germany	WC	10th	6	0	0	0	0
2017	Germany	WC	8th	8	1	2	3	2
2018	Germany	OG	2nd place, silver medalist(s)	7	0	3	3	6
2018	Germany	WC	11th	7	3	2	5	0
2019	Germany	WC	6th	8	2	0	2	2
2022	Germany	OG	10th	4	0	0	0	6
2022	Germany	WC	7th	8	3	0	3	4
2024	Germany	WC	6th	8	2	7	9	4
2025	Germany	WC	9th	6	1	1	2	0
Junior totals				10	4	9	13	2
Senior totals				65	12	15	27	26
