= Tyler Morley =

Canadian ice hockey player (born 1991)

- Born: December 19, 1991 (age 34) Burnaby, British Columbia, Canada
- Height: 5 ft 8 in (173 cm)
- Weight: 181 lb (82 kg; 12 st 13 lb)
- Position: Centre
- Shoots: Left
- NL team Former teams: EHC Kloten; San Diego Gulls; KHL Medveščak Zagreb; SaiPa; Tappara; Skellefteå AIK; Linköping HC; Grizzlys Wolfsburg
- NHL draft: Undrafted
- Playing career: 2016–present

Tyler Morley (born December 19, 1991) is a Canadian professional ice hockey centre. He is currently playing for EHC Kloten in the National League (NL). He made his professional debut with the San Diego Gulls in the American Hockey League (AHL) after concluding a collegiate career in the NCAA Division I with the Alaska Nanooks.

== Playing career ==
Morley attended University of Alaska Fairbanks where he played with the NCAA Division I hockey Alaska Nanooks. In his freshman year Morley's outstanding play was recognized when he was named to the 2012–13 CCHA All-Rookie Team, and in his junior year he was named to the 2014–15 WCHA First All-Star Team.

After spending his first full professional season with the San Diego Gulls in the American Hockey League in 2016–17, Morley opted to continue his career abroad in agreeing to a one-year deal with Croatian outfit, KHL Medveščak Zagreb of the EBEL on July 24, 2017.

Morley in his debut season in the Finnish Liiga with SaiPa, made an instant impact in the 2018–19 season, among the club's offensive leaders, he compiled 17 goals and 41 points in 57 games.

On May 20, 2019, Morley opted to continue in Finland, agreeing to a one-year contract with fellow Liiga club, Tappara.

In preparation for his sixth season abroad in Europe, Morley was signed as a free agent to a one-year contract with German club, Grizzlys Wolfsburg of the DEL, on June 3, 2022.

== Career statistics ==
			Regular season					Playoffs
Season	Team	League	GP	G	A	Pts	PIM	GP	G	A	Pts	PIM
2007–08	Grandview Steelers	PIJHL	29	5	5	10	41	17	5	7	12	12
2008–09	Surrey Eagles	BCHL	50	7	11	18	38	9	2	0	2	12
2009–10	Surrey Eagles	BCHL	53	19	18	37	61	6	1	0	1	4
2010–11	Surrey Eagles	BCHL	47	13	23	36	69	16	5	4	9	22
2011–12	Surrey Eagles	BCHL	58	28	37	65	89	12	5	4	9	21
2012–13	U. of Alaska-Fairbanks	CCHA	37	10	11	21	48	—	—	—	—	—
2013–14	U. of Alaska-Fairbanks	WCHA	31	17	17	34	58	—	—	—	—	—
2014–15	U. of Alaska-Fairbanks	WCHA	32	15	22	37	43	—	—	—	—	—
2015–16	U. of Alaska-Fairbanks	WCHA	29	18	12	30	29	—	—	—	—	—
2015–16	San Diego Gulls	AHL	2	1	1	2	0	—	—	—	—	—
2016–17	San Diego Gulls	AHL	48	5	12	17	14	4	0	1	1	6
2017–18	Medveščak Zagreb	EBEL	54	25	38	63	44	6	6	5	11	2
2018–19	SaiPa	Liiga	57	17	24	41	79	3	0	2	2	2
2019–20	Tappara	Liiga	37	14	24	38	14	—	—	—	—	—
2020–21	Skelleftea AIK	SHL	33	1	5	6	62	—	—	—	—	—
2020–21	Linkoping HC	SHL	20	4	9	13	2	—	—	—	—	—
2021–22	Tappara	Liiga	48	12	23	35	30	14	1	5	6	8
2022–23	Grizzlys Wolfsburg	DEL	49	16	29	45	21	14	3	10	13	8
2023–24	EHC Kloten	NL	41	12	11	23	16	—	—	—	—	—
AHL totals			50	6	13	19	14	4	0	1	1	6
Liiga totals			142	43	71	114	123	17	1	7	8	10

== Awards and honours ==
Award	Year
College
CCHA All-Rookie Team	2012–13
WCHA Third Team All-star	2013–14
All-WCHA First Team	2014–15, 2015–16
WCHA All-Academic Team	2015–16
