= Darren Archibald =

Canadian professional ice hockey player

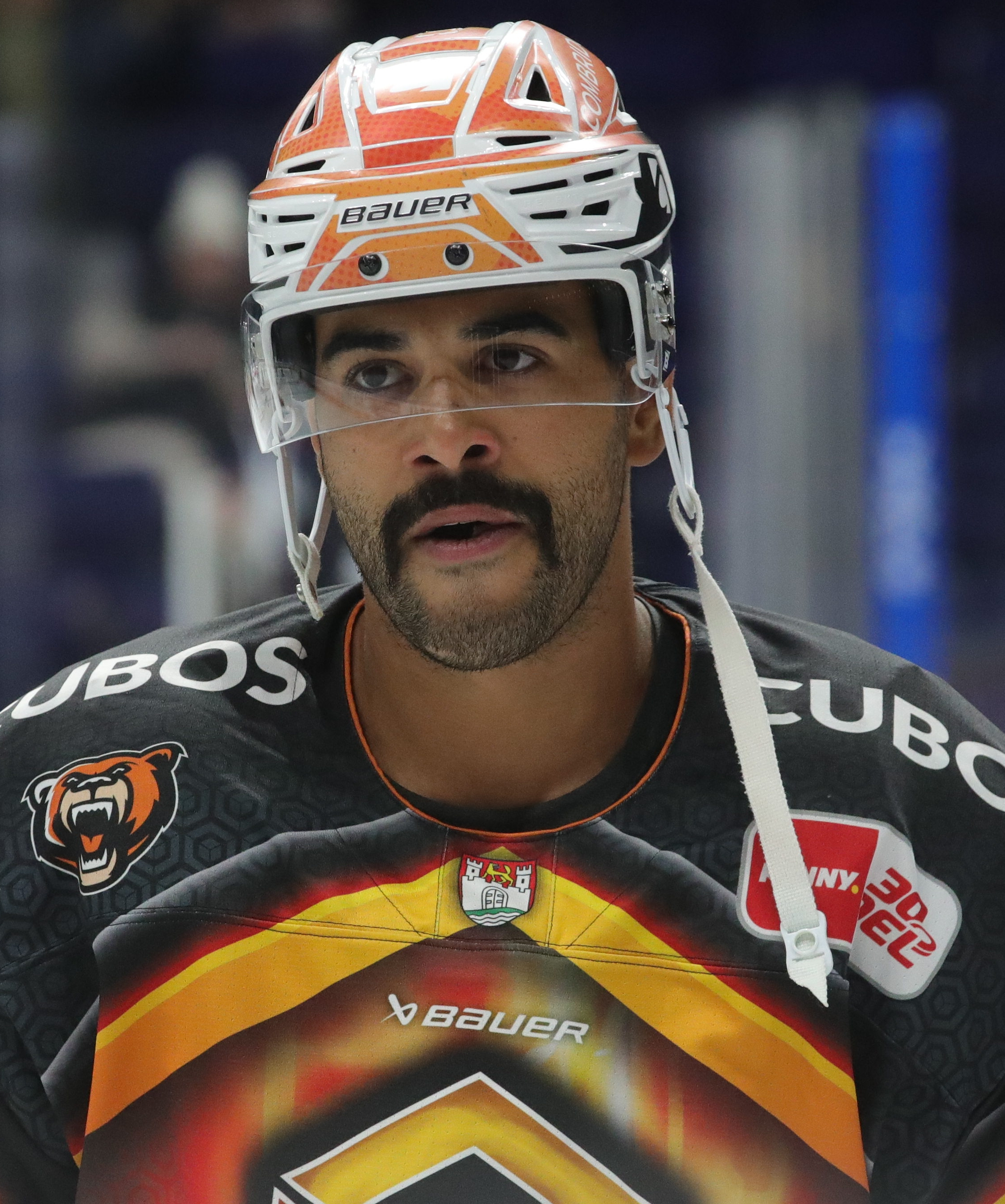
- Archibald with the Grizzlys Wolfsburg in 2023
- Born: February 9, 1990 (age 36) Newmarket, Ontario, Canada
- Height: 6 ft 3 in (191 cm)
- Weight: 209 lb (95 kg; 14 st 13 lb)
- Position: Left wing
- Shoots: Left
- ICEHL team Former teams: Fehérvár AV19; Vancouver Canucks; Ottawa Senators; Vienna Capitals; Grizzlys Wolfsburg
- NHL draft: Undrafted
- Playing career: 2011–present

Darren Archibald (born February 9, 1990) is a Canadian professional ice hockey player who is currently playing for HC Prešov in the Tipsport Liga, which he joined in August 2026 from Fehérvár AV19 in the ICE Hockey League. He played major junior hockey in the Ontario Hockey League (OHL) for the Barrie Colts and Niagara IceDogs. Undrafted out of junior, he signed with the Vancouver Canucks as a free agent and played at multiple levels within the organization.

== Playing career ==
=== Amateur ===
In his first year of junior hockey, Archibald was cut from an Ontario Hockey League (OHL) try-out and played a season in junior A. He played for the Stouffville Spirit in the Ontario Junior Hockey League (OJHL), recording 21 goals and 47 points in 48 games. The following season he made the Barrie Colts in the OHL. He recorded 25 goals and 49 points in 68 games. He added seven points in five playoff games as Barrie lost in the first round to the Mississauga St. Michael's Majors. After going undrafted prior to the start of the 2009–10 OHL season, Archibald was invited to the NHL's Columbus Blue Jackets development training camp as a free agent. Upon returning to Barrie, Archibald scored 26 goals and 59 points in 57 games. In the playoffs, Barrie defeated the Sudbury Wolves, Brampton Battalion and the Mississauga St. Michael's Majors to advance to the OHL championship, where they were swept by the Windsor Spitfires. In the playoffs Archibald added 5 goals and 10 points in 15 games.

In the off-season, Archibald was again passed over in the NHL entry draft. He attended the Detroit Red Wings NHL conditioning prospect camp and played in the corresponding prospect tournament. He returned to the OHL for his over-age season, where he scored 18 goals in 24 games for Barrie before being traded to the Niagara IceDogs. Shortly after the trade, he signed an NHL entry-level free agent contract with the Vancouver Canucks. In Niagara, Archibald added another 23 goals and 36 points in 37 games. In the opening game of the playoffs, he scored four goals in a 7–1 win over Brampton. Niagara defeated the Battalion in four games and eliminated the Oshawa Generals in the second round. Following the second round victory, Archibald was named the OHL Player of the Week. The IceDogs were eventually eliminated in the conference finals by Mississauga as Archibald finished the playoffs with 10 goals and 14 points in 14 games.

=== Professional ===
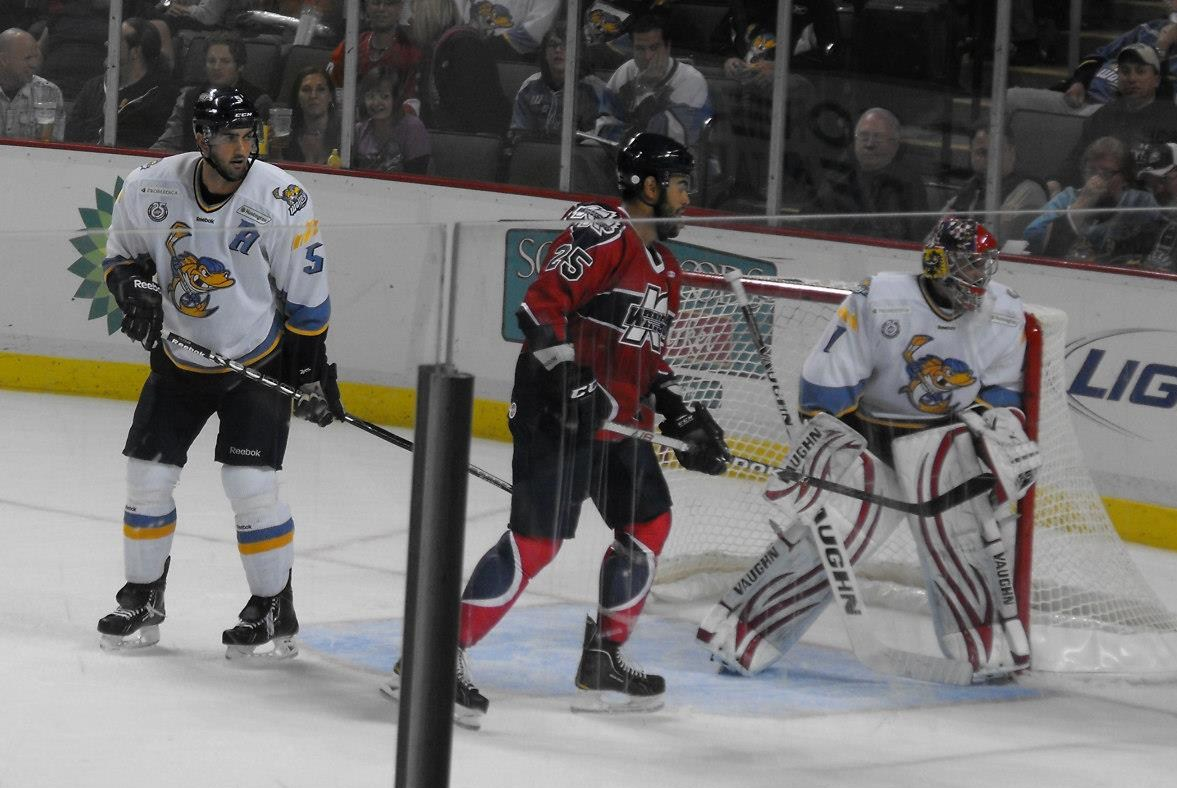
Archibald (in red) playing for the ECHL's Kalamazoo Wings

In the pre-season before the 2011–12 season, Archibald represented the Canucks in the 2011 Young Stars Tournament, where he scored two goals and added an assist to tie for the team lead. After the tournament, he was invited to the Canucks' main training camp, but failed to make the team and was reassigned to the American Hockey League's (AHL) Chicago Wolves. He started the season with Chicago and scored a goal in the Wolves' season opener. He failed to score in the next 17 games and was sent down to the ECHL's Kalamazoo Wings. In the ECHL, Archibald scored 9 goals and 30 points in 36 games, which earned him a recall to the Wolves. He played two games in the AHL without scoring and was reassigned back to the Wings. He finished the year with 14 goals and 45 points in 49 games to lead all Kalamazoo rookies in points.

In his second professional season in 2012–13, the 2012–13 NHL lockout led to several younger Canucks' playing in the AHL. With the increased depth in Chicago, Archibald did not make the Wolves out of training camp and was assigned to Kalamazoo. While there, he scored 6 goals and 14 points in 18 games. At the same time, Chicago sustained several injuries and had a struggling powerplay. As a result, Archibald was recalled from the Wings. He scored in his second game with the Wolves and after playing eight games Archibald was tied for third on the Wolves for goal scoring. When the lockout ended, Archibald was 1 of 12 Wolves players called up for an abbreviated training camp in Vancouver. He was returned to Chicago at the end of camp. Archibald finished the season scoring 12 goals and 22 points in 55 games. As the Wolves did not make the 2013 Calder Cup playoffs, Archibald was called up to the Canucks as an extra player in case of emergency. Following the end of the playoffs, Archibald became a restricted free agent. He re-signed with the Canucks on a one-year, two-way contract worth $600,000 at the NHL level.

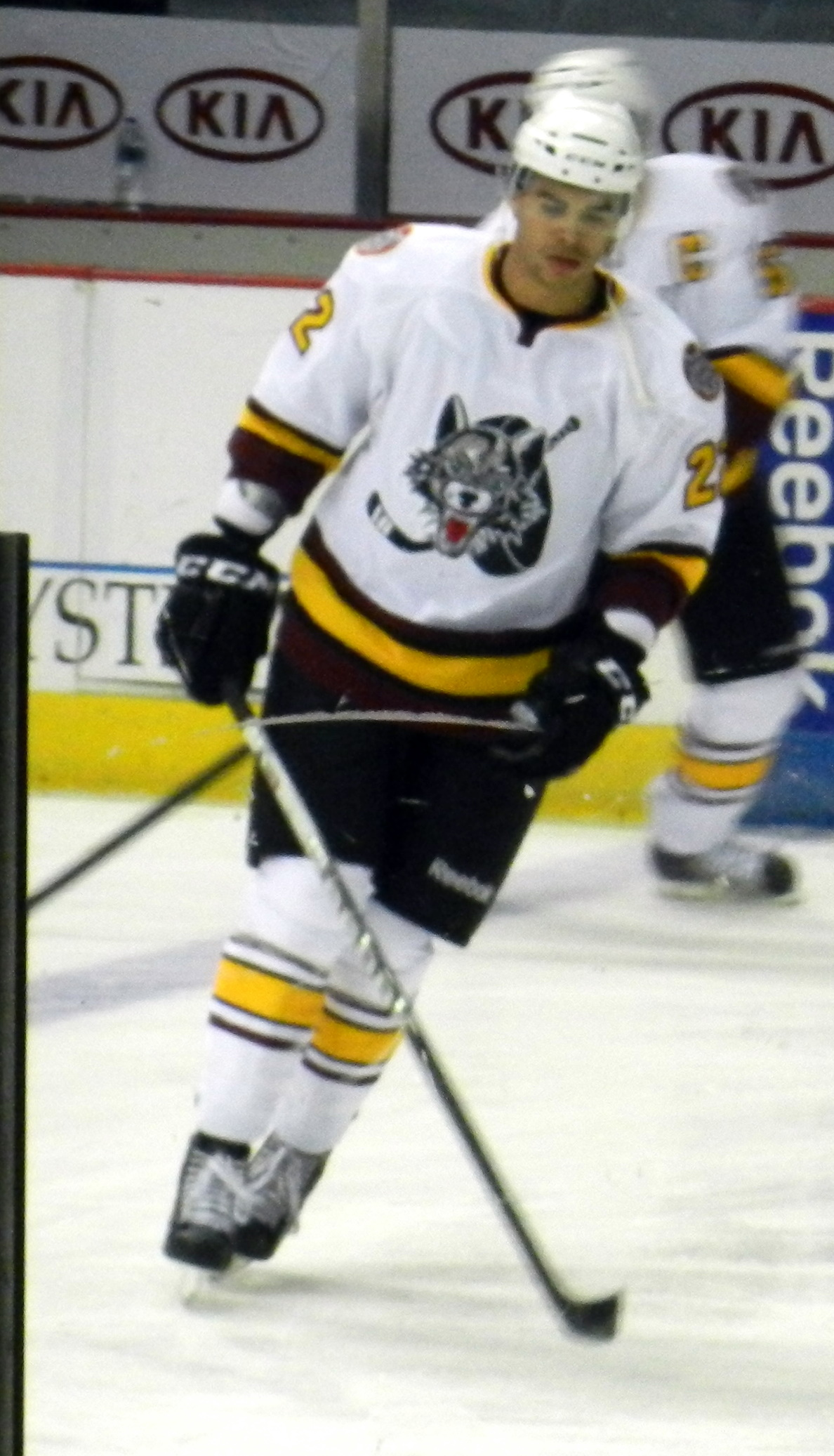
Archibald while a member of the Chicago Wolves

Archibald attended the Canucks' training camp to start the 2013–14 season, but was sent down to the AHL to join Vancouver's new affiliate, the Utica Comets. He played four games for Utica, recording a goal and an assist. While Archibald was with the Comets, Vancouver suffered several injuries, resulting in Archibald's call-up. He made his NHL debut on October 25, 2013, in a 3–2 overtime win against the St. Louis Blues. He played eight minutes, recording two shots and a hit. Eight days later, he recorded his first career point, an assist, in a 4–0 win over the Toronto Maple Leafs. He was reassigned to the Comets on November 12, 2013. Archibald made another brief appearance with Vancouver in January 2014. In March, Daniel Sedin suffered a leg injury and Archibald was recalled to fill his roster spot. During his third call-up, Archibald scored his first career NHL goal on March 8, 2014, against Joni Ortio of the Calgary Flames.

Despite limited NHL success, Archibald found himself without an NHL contract and remained in the Canucks minor league system for several years. In the 2016–17 season, Archibald had a breakout year statistically, scoring 47 points in 76 games and winning the Comets' MVP award. After a strong preseason, Archibald was one of the Canucks' last cuts to start the 2017–18 season. On February 7, 2018, the Canucks announced that they had signed Archibald to an NHL contract and that he would make his return to the NHL.

On October 1, 2018, Archibald was placed on, then cleared waivers, and assigned to begin the 2018–19 season with the Utica Comets. He was later recalled to play on Canucks' depleted/injured roster, appearing in nine games and scoring two points. On January 2, 2019, Archibald and Anders Nilsson were traded to the Ottawa Senators in exchange for Mike McKenna, Tom Pyatt and a 2019 sixth-round draft pick. Archibald was immediately re-assigned to Ottawa's AHL affiliate, the Belleville Senators.

After leaving the Senators organization after the season, Archibald opted to sign a one-year AHL contract with the Toronto Marlies on July 8, 2019. In the following 2019–20 season, Archibald added 7 goals and 12 points in 34 games as an alternate captain with the Marlies before on February 19, 2020, he was traded in a return to the Belleville Senators organization for Trent Bourque, included in a corresponding NHL trade between the Senators and Maple Leafs.

After playing his first season abroad with Austrian club, Vienna Capitals of the ICE Hockey League, Archibald continued his European career by joining Grizzlys Wolfsburg of the neighbouring Deutsche Eishockey Liga on June 2, 2021.

== Career statistics ==
			Regular season					Playoffs
Season	Team	League	GP	G	A	Pts	PIM	GP	G	A	Pts	PIM
2007–08	Stouffville Spirit	OPJHL	49	21	27	48	46	15	9	9	18	35
2008–09	Barrie Colts	OHL	68	25	24	49	35	5	4	3	7	2
2009–10	Barrie Colts	OHL	57	26	33	59	62	25	5	5	10	16
2010–11	Barrie Colts	OHL	24	18	12	30	21	—	—	—	—	—
2010–11	Niagara IceDogs	OHL	37	23	13	36	30	14	10	4	14	6
2011–12	Chicago Wolves	AHL	20	1	0	1	10	—	—	—	—	—
2011–12	Kalamazoo Wings	ECHL	49	14	31	45	59	14	2	4	6	21
2012–13	Chicago Wolves	AHL	55	12	10	22	47	—	—	—	—	—
2012–13	Kalamazoo Wings	ECHL	18	6	7	13	29	—	—	—	—	—
2013–14	Utica Comets	AHL	59	10	12	22	102	—	—	—	—	—
2013–14	Vancouver Canucks	NHL	16	1	2	3	0	—	—	—	—	—
2014–15	Utica Comets	AHL	70	14	10	24	107	6	1	2	3	2
2015–16	Kalamazoo Wings	ECHL	6	2	0	2	0	—	—	—	—	—
2015–16	Utica Comets	AHL	51	10	9	19	96	1	1	0	1	0
2016–17	Utica Comets	AHL	76	23	24	47	58	—	—	—	—	—
2017–18	Utica Comets	AHL	25	7	9	16	15	—	—	—	—	—
2017–18	Vancouver Canucks	NHL	27	4	5	9	14	—	—	—	—	—
2018–19	Utica Comets	AHL	23	11	5	16	19	—	—	—	—	—
2018–19	Vancouver Canucks	NHL	9	1	1	2	12	—	—	—	—	—
2018–19	Belleville Senators	AHL	28	8	9	17	26	—	—	—	—	—
2018–19	Ottawa Senators	NHL	3	0	0	0	0	—	—	—	—	—
2019–20	Toronto Marlies	AHL	34	7	5	12	11	—	—	—	—	—
2019–20	Belleville Senators	AHL	9	4	4	8	2	—	—	—	—	—
2020–21	Vienna Capitals	ICEHL	15	2	14	16	2	10	2	3	5	0
2021–22	Grizzlys Wolfsburg	DEL	50	15	14	29	38	6	4	2	6	32
2022–23	Grizzlys Wolfsburg	DEL	54	21	23	44	19	14	5	6	11	8
2023–24	Grizzlys Wolfsburg	DEL	49	19	13	32	36	4	1	0	1	4
2024–25	Grizzlys Wolfsburg	DEL	43	15	10	25	24	—	—	—	—	—
NHL totals			55	6	8	14	26	—	—	—	—	—
