= Mathias Niederberger =

German ice hockey player (born 1992)

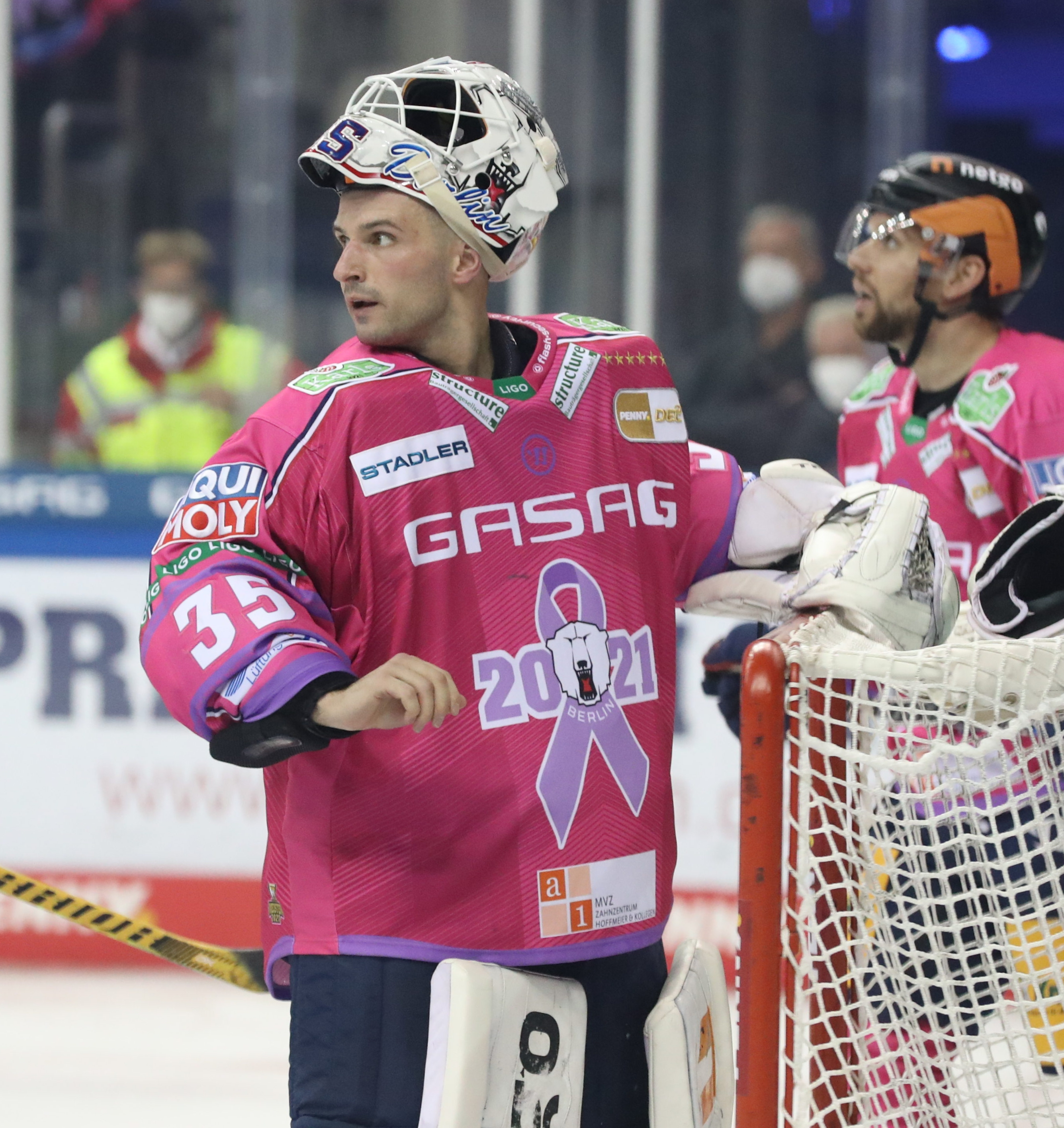
- Niederberger with the Eisbären Berlin in 2021
- Born: 26 November 1992 (age 33) Düsseldorf, Germany
- Height: 5 ft 11 in (180 cm)
- Weight: 170 lb (77 kg; 12 st 2 lb)
- Position: Goaltender
- Catches: Left
- DEL team Former teams: EHC München; Düsseldorfer EG; Manchester Monarchs; Eisbären Berlin
- National team: Germany
- NHL draft: Undrafted
- Playing career: 2010–present

Mathias Niederberger is a German professional ice hockey player who is a goaltender for EHC Red Bull München of the Deutsche Eishockey Liga (DEL). His father, Andreas Niederberger, is a member of the German Ice Hockey Hall of Fame.

== Playing career ==
Coming through the youth ranks of Düsseldorfer EG, he made his debut in Germany's top flight Deutsche Eishockey Liga (DEL) during the 2010–11 season. He joined EHC München of the DEL after two seasons of major junior hockey with the Barrie Colts of the Ontario Hockey League (OHL). With NHL aspirations, Niederberger was later granted a release from his contract with EHC to sign a one-year American Hockey League contract with the Manchester Monarchs on 19 July 2013.

In his only North American season in 2013–14, Niederberger struggled to adapt and was also hampered by injuries, appearing in 6 games with the Monarchs. At the season's end, he opted to return to Germany's top division, signing a multi-year contract to compete for a starting position with Eisbären Berlin on 5 June 2014. After spending the 2014–15 season with the Eisbären squad, seeing the ice in 12 DEL contests, Niederberger went back to Düsseldorfer EG on loan. He received 2015–16 DEL Goaltender of the Year honors.

Following his fifth consecutive season with Düsseldorfer in 2019–20, Niederberger left the club after his contract expired, agreeing to join his former loan club, Eisbären Berlin, on an optional multi-year contract on 19 March 2020.

== International play ==
Medal record

Representing Germany

Ice hockey

World Championships
Silver medal – second place	2023 Finland/Latvia	

In April 2016, he made his debut for the German national team. He also represented Germany at the 2018 IIHF World Championship.

== Career statistics ==
=== International ===
Year	Team	Event	Result	GP	W	L	T	MIN	GA	SO	GAA	SV%
2010	Germany	U18-D1	11th	3	3	0	0	180	2	1	0.67	.965
2012	Germany	WJC-D1	11th	5	5	0	0	260	7	0	1.62	.921
2018	Germany	WC	11th	1	1	0	0	62	2	0	1.94	.947
2019	Germany	WC	6th	4	3	1	0	237	7	0	1.77	.942
2021	Germany	WC	4th	7	4	3	0	423	12	0	1.70	.929
2022	Germany	OG	10th	3	1	2	0	179	10	0	3.36	.868
2022	Germany	WC	7th	2	2	0	0	120	6	0	3.00	.842
2023	Germany	WC	2nd place, silver medalist(s)	9	6	3	0	542	20	1	2.21	.903
2024	Germany	WC	6th	3	1	2	0	140	9	0	3.86	.880
2025	Germany	WC	9th	4	1	3	0	186	12	0	3.87	.857
Junior totals				8	8	0	0	440	9	1	1.23	.957
Senior totals				33	19	14	0	1,889	78	1	2.48	.923

== Awards and honors ==
Award	Year
DEL
Goaltender of the Year	2016, 2020
Champion (Eisbären Berlin)	2021
