= Maximilian Kastner =

German ice hockey player

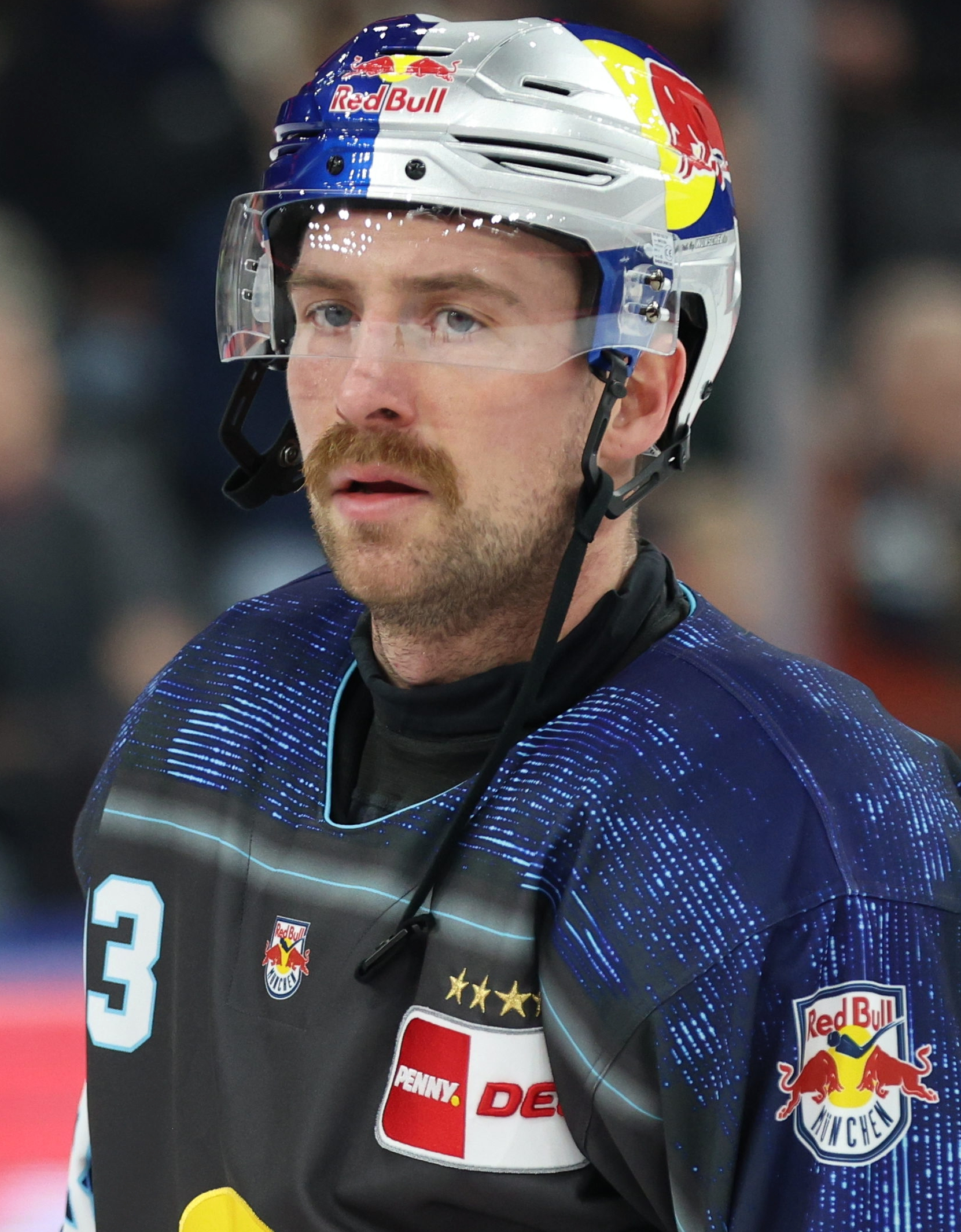
- Born: 3 January 1993 (age 33) Garmisch-Partenkirchen, Germany
- Height: 1.80 m (5 ft 11 in)
- Weight: 84 kg (185 lb; 13 st 3 lb)
- Position: Left wing
- Shoots: Left
- DEL team: EHC München
- National team: Germany
- Playing career: 2011–present

Maximilian Kastner (born 3 January 1993) is a German professional ice hockey player who is a left winger for EHC Red Bull München of the Deutsche Eishockey Liga (DEL).

He represented Germany national team at the 2021 IIHF World Championship.

== Career statistics ==
Medal record

Representing Germany

Ice hockey

World Championships
Silver medal – second place	2023 Finland/Latvia	

=== International ===
Year	Team	Event	Result	GP	G	A	Pts	PIM
2021	Germany	WC	4th	10	0	0	0	4
2022	Germany	WC	7th	8	0	3	3	8
2023	Germany	WC	2nd place, silver medalist(s)	10	2	3	5	4
2024	Germany	WC	6th	7	2	3	5	0
2025	Germany	WC	9th	7	1	2	3	2
2026	Germany	WC	10th	7	0	2	2	4
Senior totals				49	5	13	18	22
