= Olympia Eishalle =

Indoor sporting arena in Munich, Germany

Coordinates: 48°10′30″N 11°33′26″E

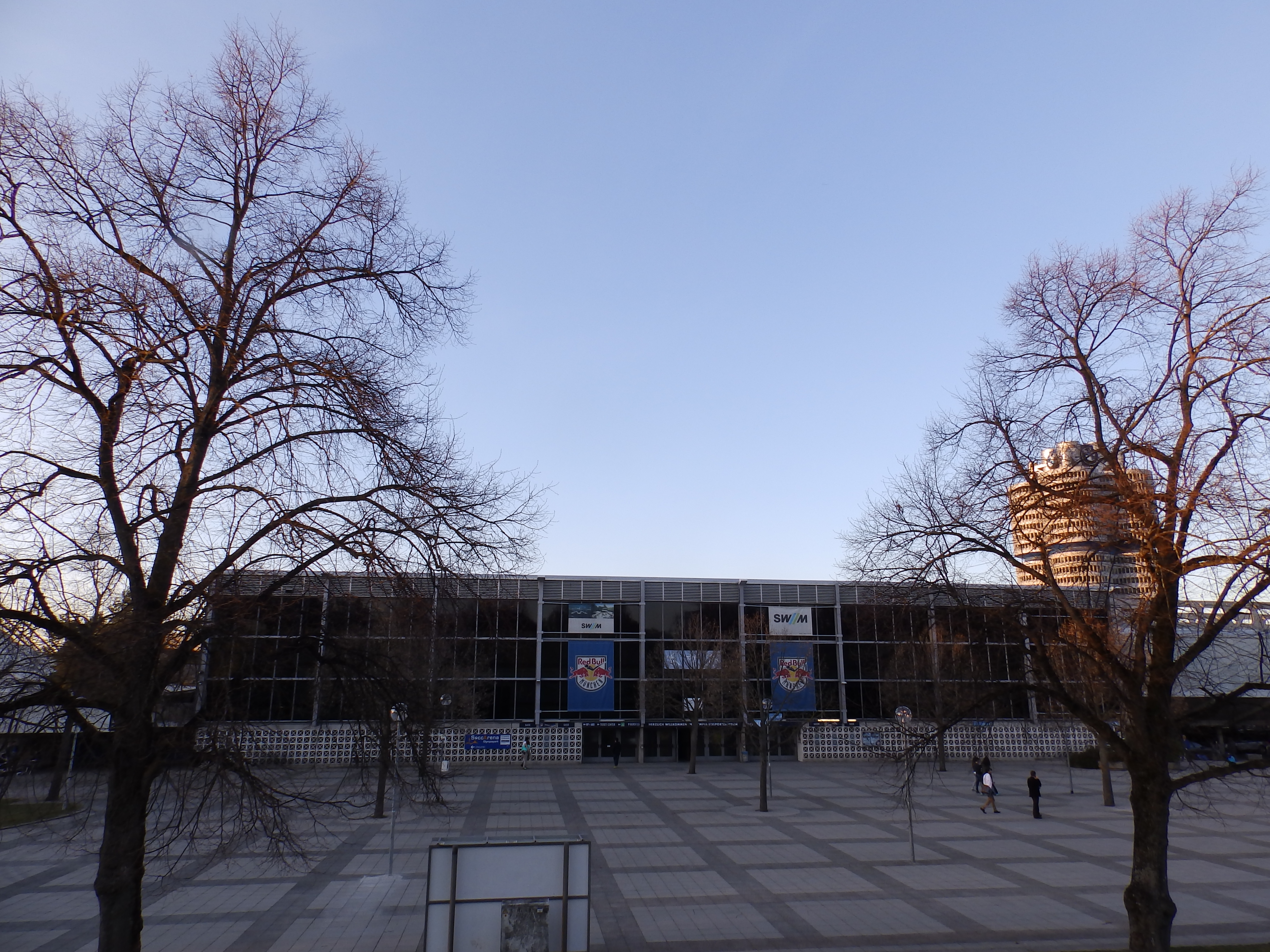
- Interactive map of Olympia Eishalle
- Former names: Eisstadion am Oberwiesenfeld
- Location: Munich, Germany
- Capacity: 6,256

Construction
- Groundbreaking: April 1965
- Built: 1965-1967
- Opened: February 1967

Tenant
- EHC München (DEL) (2000–2024)

Olympia Eishalle (originally known as Eisstadion am Oberwiesenfeld) is an indoor sporting arena located in Munich, Germany. It is used for various indoor events and from 2000 to 2024 was the home arena of the ice hockey team EHC München now playing in the Deutsche Eishockey Liga (previously it played in 2nd Bundesliga and lower leagues). The capacity of the arena is 6,256 spectators.

During the 1972 Summer Olympics the arena hosted the judo and the boxing events. Temporary grandstands were built for the occasion.
