= EHC Red Bull München =

Red Bull München
- Nickname: Red Bulls
- City: Munich, Bavaria
- League: Deutsche Eishockey Liga
- Founded: 1998; 28 years ago
- Home arena: SAP Garden (capacity: 11,250)
- Colours: Navy, white, red, yellow
- Owner: Red Bull GmbH
- General manager: Christian Winkler
- Head coach: Oliver David
- Captain: Patrick Hager
- Website: www.redbullmuenchen.de

Franchise history
- 1998–2003: HC München 98
- 2003–2004: EHC München
- 2004–2013: EHC München Spielbetriebs
- 2013–present: EHC Red Bull München

Championships
- Playoff championships: 4 (2016, 2017, 2018, 2023)

Eishockeyclub Red Bull München (or EHC Red Bull München; English: Munich Red Bulls Ice Hockey Club) is a professional ice hockey team based in Munich, Germany. The club is a member of the Deutsche Eishockey Liga (DEL), the highest level of play in professional German ice hockey.

Between 2016 and 2018, the club won 3 DEL titles in a row, as well as a German Cup in 2010. The team plays its home games at SAP Garden.

== History ==
After the establishment of the club Eishockeyclub HC München 1998 on 19 January 1998, HC Munich began play in the Bezirksliga, where they won the district championship.

The club quickly moved up the ranks in German hockey in their first decade, winning league titles in both the Bayernliga. In 2003 the club changed its name to Eishockeyclub München. After getting promoted in 2003 from the Bavarian League to the Oberliga, the senior team was outsourced from the club to the EHC München Spielbetriebs GmbH in 2004. The club gained promotion to the 2.Bundesliga, whose championship they won in 2010.

By July 2010, EHC München had earned promotion into Germany's top league, the DEL. Furthermore, the club managed to reach the playoffs in its first season in the DEL. After financial problems the team got a new sponsor in 2012 and was renamed EHC Red Bull München. Since 1 May 2013, the company and the team have been owned by Red Bull GmbH and the company was renamed EHC Red Bull München GmbH.

== Home arena ==
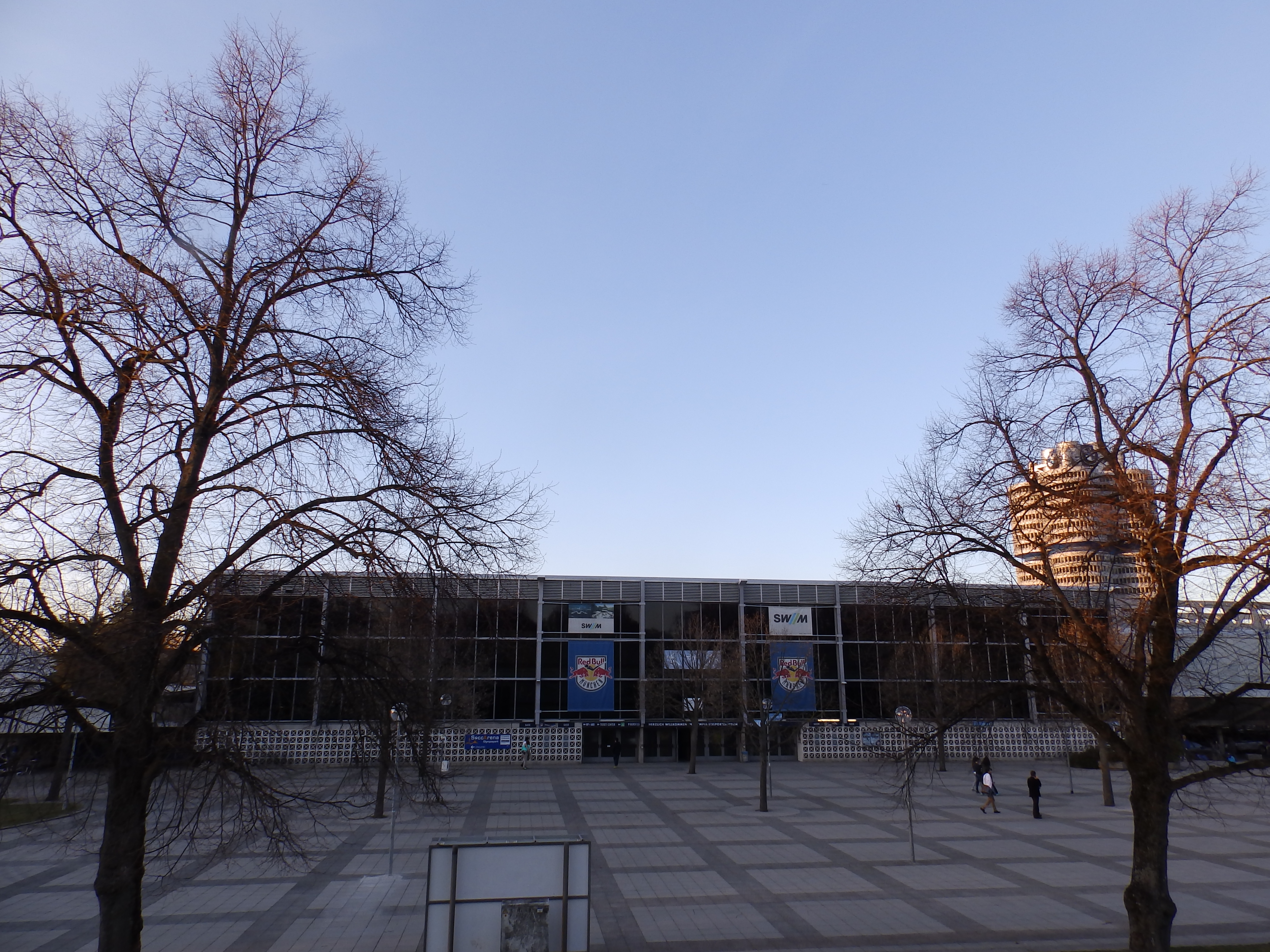
Former home arena Olympia Eishalle in Munich, Germany.

Since 2024, the team's home arena has been SAP Garden a 11,500-capacity indoor arena built in Olympiapark, Munich. Prior to that they played in the Olympia Eishalle, which seats 6,256 spectators.

== Honours ==
=== Domestic ===
- Deutsche Eishockey Liga
  - (gold) Winners: 2015–16, 2016–17, 2017–18, 2019–20 (Regular season), 2022–23
  - (silver) Runners-up: 2018–19, 2021–22
- Deutscher Eishockey-Pokal
  - (gold) Winners: 2010
- 2. Bundesliga
  - (gold) Winners: 2010
  - (silver) Runners-up: 2009
- Bayernliga
  - (gold) Winners: 2003
- Bezirksliga
  - (gold) Winners: 1999
- Landesliga
  - (silver) Runners-up: 2000
- Oberliga
  - (silver) Runners-up: 2005

=== European ===
- Champions Hockey League
  - (silver) Runners-up: 2018–19

== Players ==
=== Current roster ===
Updated 11 April 2025.

No.	Nat	Player	Pos	S/G	Age	Acquired	Birthplace
16	(Germany)	Konrad Abeltshauser	D	L	33	2016	Bad Tölz, Germany
77	(Canada)	Adam Brooks	C	L	29	2024	Winnipeg, Manitoba, Canada
4	(United States)	Will Butcher	D	L	31	2024	Sun Prairie, Wisconsin, United States
70	(Germany)	Maximilian Daubner	D	L	28	2017	Deggendorf, Germany
82	(Canada)	Chris DeSousa	C	L	35	2022	Mississauga, Ontario, Canada
42	(Germany)	Yasin Ehliz	LW	L	33	2018	Bad Tölz, Germany
11	(Germany)	Markus Eisenschmid	RW	R	31	2023	Marktoberdorf, Germany
12	(United States)	Brady Ferguson	LW	L	31	2025	Lewisville, Texas, United States
31	(Canada)	Evan Fitzpatrick	G	L	28	2025	St. John's, Newfoundland, Canada
52	(Germany)	Patrick Hager (C)	C	L	37	2017	Stuttgart, Germany
–	(Canada)	Dillon Heatherington	D	L	30	2025	Calgary, Alberta
15	(Germany)	Nikolaus Heigl	F	L	23	2023	Bad Tölz, Germany
17	(Canada)	Taro Hirose	LW	L	29	2024	Winnipeg, Manitoba, Canada
93	(Germany)	Maximilian Kastner	F	L	33	2015	Garmisch-Partenkirchen, Germany
74	(United States)	Les Lancaster	D	R	31	2024	Ypsilanti, Michigan, United States
91	(Canada)	Jeremy McKenna	RW	R	27	2025	Canmore, Alberta, Canada
35	(Germany)	Mathias Niederberger	G	L	33	2022	Düsseldorf, Germany
27	(Germany)	Veit Oswald	F	L	21	2022	Landshut, Germany
84	(Canada)	Trevor Parkes	RW	R	34	2018	Fort Erie, Ontario, Canada
33	(United States)	Will Riedell	D	L	29	2025	Greensboro, North Carolina, United States
8	(Germany)	Tobias Rieder	RW	L	33	2024	Landshut, Germany
63	(Germany)	Luis Schinko	C	R	25	2025	Landshut, Germany
25	(Germany)	Simon Wolf	G	L	21	2024	Schwabach, Germany
