= 2024 Spengler Cup =

Ice hockey tournament in Switzerland

Tournament details
- Host country: Switzerland
- Venue: Eisstadion Davos
- Dates: 26–31 December
- Teams: 6

Final positions
- Champions: (Switzerland) HC Fribourg-Gottéron (1st title)
- Runners-up: (Germany) Straubing Tigers

Tournament statistics
- Games played: 11
- Goals scored: 76 (6.91 per game)
- Scoring leader(s): Jonathan Hazen (Team Canada); Adam Tambellini (HC Davos) (6 points)

Official website
- Spengler Cup

The 2024 Spengler Cup was held from 26 to 31 December 2024 at Eisstadion Davos, Davos.

== Teams participating ==
- Team Canada
- (Czech Republic) HC Dynamo Pardubice
- (Switzerland) HC Fribourg-Gottéron
- (Finland) Oulun Kärpät
- (Germany) Straubing Tigers
- (Switzerland) HC Davos (host)

== Group stage ==
All times are local (UTC+1).

=== Group Torriani ===
Pos	Team	Pld	W	OTW	OTL	L	GF	GA	GD	Pts	Qualification
1	(Switzerland) HC Fribourg-Gottéron	2	1	0	1	0	8	7	+1	4	Semifinals
2	(Czech Republic) HC Dynamo Pardubice	2	0	1	1	0	5	5	0	3	Quarterfinals
3	(Finland) Oulun Kärpät	2	0	1	0	1	7	8	−1	2	Quarterfinals

Updated to match(es) played on unknown. Source:

26 December 2024; 15:10	HC Fribourg-Gottéron (Switzerland)	2–3 GWS (0-2, 0–0, 2–0) (OT: 0–0) (SO: 0–1)	(Czech Republic) HC Dynamo Pardubice	Eisstadion Davos

Game reference

Reto Berra
Goalies
Roman Will
Tomáš Vomáčka

	0–1	Radil (Musil) – 09:07
	0–2	Rákos (Dvořák, Pochobradský) – 12:47
Rathgeb (de la Rose, Sörensen) – 50:00	1–2
Gunderson (Vey, Bertschy) – 50:54	2–2

Wallmark (miss)
Vey (miss)
Sörensen (miss)
Audette (miss)
de la Rose (miss)
Shootout
(miss) Paulovič
Sedlák
(miss) Radil
(miss) Herčík
(miss) Kousal
29 min
Penalties
31 min
34
Shots
21

27 December 2024; 15:10	Oulun Kärpät (Finland)	4–6 (3-2, 0-2, 1-2)	(Switzerland) HC Fribourg-Gottéron	Eisstadion Davos

Game reference

Niclas Westerholm
Goalies
Loic Galley

Mäenalanen (Rueschhoff) – 02:10	1-0
	1-1	Brennan (Sörensen, Marchon) – 06:58
Gardiner (Masin, Melnick) – 06:35	2-1
	2-2	Sutter (Sörensen, De la Rose) – 10:49
Juusola (Gardiner, Melnick) – 15:58	3-2
	3-3	Nicolet (Audette, Kristoff) – 26:35
	3-4	Jecker – 33:31
	3-5	De la Rose – 45:07 (SH)
Virta (Turunen) – 51:22	4-5
	4-6	Lilja (Bertschy) – 58:25 (EN)

4 min
Penalties
27 min
25
Shots
20

28 December 2024; 15:10	HC Dynamo Pardubice (Czech Republic)	2–3 OT (1–1, 0–0, 1–1, 0–1)	(Finland) Oulun Kärpät	Eisstadion Davos

Game reference

Tomáš Vomáčka
Goalies
Tomi Karhunen

	0–1	Virta (Tardif, Melnick) – 2:41
Kaut (Sedlák) – 7:03	1–1
	1–2	Turunen (Kovařčík, Koivisto) – 54:35
Musil (Mandát, Sedlák) – 56:11	2–2
	2–3	Gardiner (Tardif, Mašín) 63:24

31 min
Penalties
6 min
35
Shots
30

=== Group Cattini ===
Pos	Team	Pld	W	OTW	OTL	L	GF	GA	GD	Pts	Qualification
1	Team Canada	2	2	0	0	0	12	5	+7	6	Semifinals
2	(Switzerland) HC Davos (H)	2	1	0	0	1	7	6	+1	3	Quarterfinals
3	(Germany) Straubing Tigers	2	0	0	0	2	3	11	−8	0	Quarterfinals

Updated to match(es) played on unknown. Source:
(H) Host

26 December 2024; 20:15	HC Davos (Switzerland)	2–6 (1–2, 1–3, 0–1)	Team Canada	Eisstadion Davos

Game reference

Sandro Aeschlimann
Goalies
Colten Ellis

Palve (Zadina, Kessler) – 08:05	1–0
	1–1	10:03 – Hazen (SH)
	1–2	12:34 – Carr (Aspirot, Gagner)
Zadina (Tambellini, Lennström) – 29:34	2–2
	2–3	30:43 – Hudon (Maillet, Hazen)
	2–4	32:53 – Shaw (Hollowell, Seney)
	2–5	38:00 – Hudon (Hazen)
	2–6	51:26 – Fritz (Jooris)

4 min
Penalties
8 min
27
Shots
27

27 December 2024; 20:15	Straubing Tigers (Germany)	0–5 (0-0, 0-1, 0-4)	(Switzerland) HC Davos	Eisstadion Davos

Game reference

Zane McIntyre
Goalies
Luca Hollenstein

0-1	Andersson (Zadina, Kessler) - 27:47 (PP)
0-2	Tambellini (Frehner, Honka) - 46:20
0-3	Kessler (Zadina, Honka) - 51:53
0-4	Frehner (Tambellini) - 53:15
0-5	Lemieux (Stransky) - 55:30

12 min
Penalties
10 min
35
Shots
28

28 December 2024; 20:15	Team Canada	6–3 (1–1, 2–1, 3–1)	(Germany) Straubing Tigers	Eisstadion Davos

Game reference

Colten Ellis
Goalies
Florian Bugl

Carr (Bowey, Jooris) - 04:33	1-0
	1-1	Brandt (Samanski, Lipon) - 07:08 (PP)
Shaw (McKenzie, Seney) - 21:10	2-1
	2-2	St. Denis (Leier, Green) - 29:15 (PP)
Shaw (Hudon, Hollowell) - 36:17 (PP)	3-2
Bowey (Hudon, Hazen) - 40:48	4-2
	4-3	Hede (Brandt, Samuelsson) - 48:37 (PP)
Hoefenmayer (Maillet, Gregoire) - 51:43 (PP)	5-3
Hazen (Irwin) - 52:56	6-3

16 min
Penalties
10 min
28
Shots
20

== Knockout stage ==
=== Bracket ===
Quarterfinals
29 December
T2 (Czech Republic) HC Dynamo Pardubice	2
C3 (Germany) Straubing Tigers	4
29 December
C2 (Switzerland) HC Davos	4
T3 (Finland) Oulun Kärpät	3

Semifinals
30 December
C1 Team Canada	2
C3 (Germany) Straubing Tigers	4
30 December
T1 (Switzerland) HC Fribourg-Gottéron	4
C2 (Switzerland) HC Davos	2

Final
31 December
C3 (Germany) Straubing Tigers	2
T1 (Switzerland) HC Fribourg-Gottéron	7

=== Quarterfinals ===
29 December 2024; 15:10	HC Dynamo Pardubice (Czech Republic)	2–4 (1–1, 1–0, 0–3)	(Germany) Straubing Tigers	Eisstadion Davos

Game reference

Roman Will
Goalies
Zane McIntyre

	0–1	12:41 – Connolly
Rákos (Kousal, Čerešňák) – 17:50	1–1
Kelemen (Sedlák, Kaut) – 22:53	2–1
	2–2	47:22 – Braun (Brandt, Connolly)
	2–3	56:22 – Samuelsson (Hede, Brandt) (PP)
	2–4	56:48 – Samanski

10 min
Penalties
10 min
35
Shots
21

29 December 2024; 20:15	HC Davos (Switzerland)	4–3 (1–0, 3–2, 0–1)	(Finland) Oulun Kärpät	Eisstadion Davos

Game reference

Luca Hollenstein
Goalies
Tomi Karhunen
Niclas Westerholm

Tambellini (Corvi, Lennström) – 01:28	1–0
Knak (Ambühl, Egli) – 22:19	2–0
Palve (Kessler) – 24:56	3–0
	3–1	27:53 – Hermonen (Mäenalanen) (SH)
Corvi (Tambellini, Lennström) (PP) – 28:40	4–1
	4–2	39:26 – Virta (Mäenalanen, Melnick) (PP)
	4–3	47:09 – Virta (Kovařčík, Pokka)

29 min
Penalties
2 min
27
Shots
35

=== Semifinals ===
30 December 2024; 15:10	Team Canada	2–4 (1–1, 1–1, 0–2)	(Germany) Straubing Tigers	Eisstadion Davos

Game reference

Colten Ellis
Goalies
Zane McIntyre

	0–1	03:58 – Leier (St. Denis, Connolly) (PP)
Carr (White, Jooris) – 08:49	1–1
Carr (Hazen, Hoefenmayer) (PP) – 25:57	2–1
	2–2	31:48 – Lipon (Connolly, Leonhardt)
	2–3	49:04 – Samanski (Lipon, Connolly)
	2–4	58:13 – Fleischer (Hede, Braun) (EN)

12 min
Penalties
10 min
32
Shots
44

30 December 2024; 20:15	HC Fribourg-Gottéron (Switzerland)	4–2 (1–2, 0–0, 3–0)	(Switzerland) HC Davos	Eisstadion Davos

Game reference

Reto Berra
Goalies
Sandro Aeschlimann

Vey (Wallmark, Gunderson) (PP) – 06:26	1–0
	1–1	17:06 – Stránský (Ryfors, Barandun)
	1–2	19:23 – Frehner (Corvi, Tambellini)
Vey (Sörensen, Gunderson) (PP) – 46:50	2–2
Bertschy (Walser, Marchon) – 55:48	3–2
De la Rose (Wallmark, Diaz) (EN) – 58:35	4–2

6 min
Penalties
18 min
25
Shots
23

=== Final ===
31 December 2024; 12:10	Straubing Tigers (Germany)	2–7 (1–4, 1–3, 0–0)	(Switzerland) HC Fribourg-Gottéron	Eisstadion Davos

Game reference

Zane McIntyre
Florian Bugl
Goalies
Reto Berra

	0–1	00:27 – De la Rose (Sörensen)
	0–2	01:32 – Lilja (Bertschy)
Brunnhuber (McKenzie, Schönberger) – 02:00	1–2
	1–3	03:12 – Marchon (Krištof, Audette)
	1–4	09:38 – Bertschy (Jecker, Lilja)
	1–5	24:51 – Brennan (Wallmark, Sörensen)
Zimmermann (Leier, Brunnhuber) – 27:28	2–5
	2–6	28:36 – Vey (Lilja, Bertschy)
	2–7	35:32 – Borgman (Krištof)

6 min
Penalties
8 min
29
Shots
34

== All-Star Team ==
Position	Player	Team
Goaltender	(United States) Zane McIntyre	(Germany) Straubing Tigers
Defencemen	(Germany) Marcel Brandt	(Germany) Straubing Tigers
Defencemen	(Czech Republic) David Musil	(Czech Republic) HC Dynamo Pardubice
Forwards	(Canada) Daniel Carr	Team Canada
Forwards	(Sweden) Jacob de la Rose	(Switzerland) HC Fribourg-Gottéron
Forwards	(Canada) Adam Tambellini	(Switzerland) HC Davos

== Statistics ==
=== Scoring leaders ===
Pos	Player	Team	GP	G	A	Pts
1	Jonathan Hazen	Team Canada	3	2	4	6
1	Adam Tambellini	HC Davos	4	2	4	6
3	Marcus Sörensen	HC Fribourg-Gottéron	4	0	6	6
4	Jacob de la Rose	HC Fribourg-Gottéron	4	3	2	5
5	Christoph Bertschy	HC Fribourg-Gottéron	4	2	3	5
6	Mike Connolly	Straubing Tigers	5	1	4	5
7	Daniel Carr	Team Canada	3	4	0	4
7	Patrik Virta	Oulun Kärpät	3	4	0	4
9	Linden Vey	HC Fribourg-Gottéron	4	3	1	4
10	Charles Hudon	Team Canada	3	2	2	4
10	Jakob Lilja	HC Fribourg-Gottéron	4	2	2	4

GP = Games played; G = Goals; A = Assists; Pts = Points
Source: eliteprospects.com

=== Goaltending leaders ===
(minimum 40% team's total ice time)

Pos	Player	Team	TOI	GA	GAA	SA	Sv%	SO
1	Luca Hollenstein	HC Davos	120	3	1.50	69	95.65	1
2	Colten Ellis	Team Canada	180	8	2.68	90	91.11	0
3	Reto Berra	HC Fribourg-Gottéron	185	7	2.27	73	90.41	0
4	Tomáš Vomáčka	HC Dynamo Pardubice	79	4	3.06	40	90.00	0
5	Tomi Karhunen	Oulun Kärpät	92	6	3.96	54	88.89	0
6	Roman Will	HC Dynamo Pardubice	108	5	2.80	40	88.89	0
7	Zane McIntyre	Straubing Tigers	205	14	4.10	111	87.39	0
8	Sandro Aeschlimann	HC Davos	120	9	4.53	51	82.35	0
9	Niclas Westerholm	Oulun Kärpät	91	5	3.32	27	81.48	0

TOI = Time on ice (minutes:seconds); GA = Goals against; GAA = Goals against average; SA = Shots against; Sv% = Save percentage; SO = Shutouts
Source: eliteprospects.com
