= Noel Hoefenmayer =

Canadian ice hockey player (born 1999)

- Hoefenmayer in 2026
- Born: January 6, 1999 (age 27) North York, Ontario, Canada
- Height: 6 ft 1 in (185 cm)
- Weight: 204 lb (93 kg; 14 st 8 lb)
- Position: Defence
- Shoots: Left
- DEL team Former teams: Augsburger Panther; Toronto Marlies; Bakersfield Condors; Laval Rocket; HC Sochi
- NHL draft: 108th overall, 2017; Arizona Coyotes
- Playing career: 2021–present

Noel Hoefenmayer (born January 6, 1999) is a Canadian professional ice hockey defenceman for the Augsburger Panther of the Deutsche Eishockey Liga (DEL). He was selected in the fourth round, 108th overall, by the Arizona Coyotes in the 2017 NHL entry draft.

== Playing career ==
=== Early years ===
Hoefenmayer played minor Midget for the Don Mills Flyers of the Greater Toronto Hockey League (GTHL) where he recorded 10 goals and 23 assists in 62 games during the 2014–15 season. He also competed for Team GTHL Blue as part of the 2014 GTHL Top Prospects Game as well as at the ensuing Ontario Hockey League (OHL) Gold Cup, winning the tournament. For his offensive output, Hoefenmayer was taken by the Ottawa 67's (36th overall) in the 2015 OHL Priority Selection draft.

=== Junior ===
By January 2017, Hoefenmayer recorded eight goals and 15 assists for 23 points which earned him a 38th overall midterm ranking by the NHL Central Scouting Bureau. He concluded the 2016–17 season with 14 goals and 40 points in 62 games but dropped to 75th overall amongst North American skaters. Ultimately, he was selected 108th overall by the Arizona Coyotes in the 2017 NHL entry draft. Hoefenmayer also received his major junior team's Top Defenseman Award at the conclusion of the season.

Prior to his final OHL season, Hoefenmayer worked collectively with the 67's strength and conditioning coach as well as the skills team. He led defensemen in goals (26) and points (82) over 58 games, with his 56 assists and plus-52 rating each ranked second league-wide. As a result, he was awarded the Max Kaminsky Trophy as OHL Defenceman of the Year, and was named the Canadian Hockey League (CHL) Defenceman of the Year and member of the 2019–20 OHL First All-Star Team.

=== Professional ===
On April 4, 2020, Hoefenmayer signed as a free agent with the Toronto Marlies, primary American Hockey League (AHL) affiliate to the Toronto Maple Leafs. He played 18 AHL games with the Marlies before being re-assigned to the Wichita Thunder of the ECHL for the remainder of the 2020–21 season. Hoefenmayer was likewise named to the Maple Leafs' 2021 Prospect Tournament roster.

On June 16, 2022, Hoefenmayer agreed to a one-year contract extension for the 2022–23 season.

Following three seasons with the Marlies, Hoefenmayer secured his first NHL deal, signing a one-year, entry-level contract with the Edmonton Oilers in July 2023. The following offseason, Hoefenmayer was given a one-year contract extension by the Oilers organization.

During the 2024–25 season, Hoefenmayer was traded by the Oilers to the Montreal Canadiens in exchange for forward Jacob Perreault on December 6, 2024. Shortly thereafter, he made his debut for the Laval Rocket, the Canadiens' AHL affiliate, recording an assist in a 6–2 victory over the Bridgeport Islanders on December 15.

Entering the offseason as a restricted free agent, Hoefenmayer was not extended a qualifying offer by the Canadiens on June 30, 2025. Thereafter, he would sign his first professional contract overseas, agreeing to a one-year deal with HC Sochi of the Kontinental Hockey League (KHL). Collectively, Hoefenmayer contributed with 23 points through 50 appearances from the blueline in 2025–26.

With Sochi missing the Gagarin Cup playoffs, Hoefenmayer left at the conclusion of his contract and was subsequently signed to a one-year contract with German club, the Augsburger Panther of the Deutsche Eishockey Liga (DEL), on March 31, 2026.

== International play ==
Medal record

Representing Canada

Men's ice hockey

World U-17 Hockey Challenge
Gold medal – first place	2015 Canada	

Internationally, Hoefenmayer first represented Hockey Canada as part of team Canada White at the 2015 World U-17 Hockey Challenge, capturing a gold medal.

In December 2024, he was named to the Canadian senior roster as part of the annual Spengler Cup tournament held in Davos, Switzerland. Recording a pair of points across three games, Hoefenmayer and his country won both of their group stage games before falling to the Straubing Tigers in the semifinals.

== Career statistics ==
			Regular season					Playoffs
Season	Team	League	GP	G	A	Pts	PIM	GP	G	A	Pts	PIM
2013–14	Toronto Nationals	GTHL	2	0	0	0	2	—	—	—	—	—
2014–15	Don Mills Flyers	GTHL	62	10	23	33	28	—	—	—	—	—
2015–16	Ottawa 67's	OHL	45	2	3	5	18	4	0	0	0	0
2016–17	Ottawa 67's	OHL	62	14	26	40	36	6	2	5	7	6
2017–18	Ottawa 67's	OHL	65	7	26	33	40	5	2	5	7	2
2018–19	Ottawa 67's	OHL	68	16	46	62	61	18	8	11	19	16
2019–20	Ottawa 67's	OHL	58	26	56	82	37	—	—	—	—	—
2020–21	Wichita Thunder	ECHL	23	2	8	10	12	5	1	3	4	0
2020–21	Toronto Marlies	AHL	18	2	4	6	4	—	—	—	—	—
2021–22	Newfoundland Growlers	ECHL	46	13	27	40	34	19	4	14	18	14
2021–22	Toronto Marlies	AHL	8	0	3	3	10	—	—	—	—	—
2022–23	Toronto Marlies	AHL	65	11	27	38	114	2	0	0	0	6
2023–24	Bakersfield Condors	AHL	47	7	11	18	64	—	—	—	—	—
2024–25	Bakersfield Condors	AHL	11	1	6	7	2	—	—	—	—	—
2024–25	Laval Rocket	AHL	32	4	10	14	23	6	1	1	2	20
2025–26	HC Sochi	KHL	50	7	16	23	20	—	—	—	—	—
AHL totals			181	25	61	86	217	8	1	1	2	26

=== International ===
Year	Team	Event	Result	GP	G	A	Pts	PIM
2015	Canada White	U17	1st place, gold medalist(s)	3	1	1	2	8
2024	Canada	SC	4th	3	1	1	2	0
Junior totals				3	1	1	2	8
Senior totals				3	1	1	2	0

== Awards and honours ==
Award	Year	Ref
GTHL
Top Prospects Game	2014	
OHL
First All-Star Team	2020	
Max Kaminsky Trophy	2020	
CHL
CHL Defenceman of the Year	2020	
AHL
All-Star Game	2023	
