= 2026–27 DEL season =

- League: Deutsche Eishockey Liga
- Sport: Ice hockey
- Duration: 17 September 2026 – 30 April 2027

Regular season
- Top scorer: Alexander Blank; Liam Kirk (25 points)

Finals

DEL seasons
- ← 2025–26 2027–28 →

The 2026–27 Deutsche Eishockey Liga season is the 33rd season since the founding of the Deutsche Eishockey Liga. It started on 17 September 2026 and will end on 30 April 2027.

== Format ==
The teams will play a double round-robin for 52 games each. After the regular season, places one to six are qualified for the playoffs while place seven to ten will play in the pre-playoffs. The playoffs will be played in a best of seven mode. The last team from the regular season is relegated to DEL2.

== Teams ==
Locations of the Teams of the 2026–27 DEL season

| Team | City | Arena | Capacity |
|---|---|---|---|
| Augsburger Panther | Augsburg | Curt Frenzel Stadium | 6,218 |
| Eisbären Berlin | Berlin | Uber Arena | 14,200 |
| Fischtown Pinguins | Bremerhaven | Eisarena Bremerhaven | 4,674 |
| Löwen Frankfurt | Frankfurt | Eissporthalle Frankfurt | 6,000 |
| ERC Ingolstadt | Ingolstadt | Saturn Arena | 4,815 |
| Iserlohn Roosters | Iserlohn | Balver-Zinn Arena | 5,000 |
| Kölner Haie | Cologne | Lanxess Arena | 18,500 |
| Krefeld Pinguine | Krefeld | Yayla Arena | 8,029 |
| Adler Mannheim | Mannheim | SAP Arena | 13,600 |
| EHC Red Bull München | Munich | SAP Garden | 11,000 |
| Nürnberg Ice Tigers | Nuremberg | PSD Bank Nürnberg Arena | 7,810 |
| Schwenninger Wild Wings | Villingen-Schwenningen | Helios Arena | 6,215 |
| Straubing Tigers | Straubing | Eisstadion am Pulverturm | 6,000 |
| Grizzlys Wolfsburg | Wolfsburg | Eis Arena Wolfsburg | 4,660 |

== Regular season ==
=== Standings ===
| Pos | Team | Pld | W | OTW | OTL | L | GF | GA | GD | Pts | Qualification or relegation |
|---|---|---|---|---|---|---|---|---|---|---|---|
| 1 | Eisbären Berlin | 18 | 12 | 1 | 1 | 4 | 66 | 39 | +27 | 39 | Advance to Playoffs and Champions Hockey League |
| 2 | EHC Red Bull München | 18 | 11 | 2 | 1 | 4 | 63 | 54 | +9 | 38 | Advance to Playoffs and Champions Hockey League |
| 3 | Nürnberg Ice Tigers | 19 | 11 | 1 | 2 | 5 | 69 | 44 | +25 | 37 | Playoffs |
| 4 | Adler Mannheim | 19 | 10 | 2 | 2 | 5 | 67 | 55 | +12 | 36 | Playoffs |
| 5 | Straubing Tigers | 18 | 9 | 1 | 0 | 8 | 65 | 56 | +9 | 29 | Playoffs |
| 6 | Fischtown Pinguins | 18 | 9 | 0 | 1 | 8 | 47 | 46 | +1 | 28 | Playoffs |
| 7 | Kölner Haie | 19 | 6 | 2 | 4 | 7 | 64 | 67 | −3 | 26 | Pre-playoffs |
| 8 | Grizzlys Wolfsburg | 19 | 5 | 4 | 2 | 8 | 51 | 61 | −10 | 25 | Pre-playoffs |
| 9 | Schwenninger Wild Wings | 20 | 6 | 3 | 1 | 10 | 50 | 70 | −20 | 25 | Pre-playoffs |
| 10 | Augsburger Panther | 18 | 6 | 3 | 0 | 9 | 59 | 60 | −1 | 24 | Pre-playoffs |
| 11 | Krefeld Pinguine | 19 | 7 | 0 | 2 | 10 | 48 | 56 | −8 | 23 | |
| 12 | ERC Ingolstadt | 19 | 6 | 2 | 1 | 10 | 60 | 72 | −12 | 23 | |
| 13 | Iserlohn Roosters | 18 | 5 | 1 | 3 | 9 | 47 | 67 | −20 | 20 | |
| 14 | Löwen Frankfurt | 18 | 4 | 1 | 3 | 10 | 40 | 49 | −9 | 17 | Relegated to DEL2 |

Updated to match(es) played on 22 November 2026. Source: DEL
Rules for classification: 1) points; 2) head-to-head points; 3) head-to-head goal difference; 4) head-to-head number of goals scored.

=== Results ===
| Home \ Away | AUG | BER | BRE | FRA | ING | ISE | KÖL | KRE | MAN | MÜN | NÜR | SCH | STR | WOL | AUG | BER | BRE | FRA | ING | ISE | KÖL | KRE | MAN | MÜN | NÜR | SCH | STR | WOL |
|---|---|---|---|---|---|---|---|---|---|---|---|---|---|---|---|---|---|---|---|---|---|---|---|---|---|---|---|---|
| Augsburger Panther | — | | 3–0 | 3–2^{OT} | | | 4–6 | | 3–6 | 4–5 | 5–4^{SO} | 7–3 | 2–4 | 5–2 | — | | | | | | | | | | | | | |
| Eisbären Berlin | 2–1 | — | | | 5–3 | 4–0 | | | 1–3 | 3–4 | 4–1 | 2–4 | 4–2 | 5–0 | | — | | | | | | | | | | | | |
| Fischtown Pinguins | 5–2 | 0–3 | — | 2–1 | 6–2 | 2–1 | | | 6–3 | 1–4 | 2–1 | | 5–2 | | | | — | | | | | | | | | | | |
| Löwen Frankfurt | | 0–2 | 2–3 | — | 5–2 | 4–1 | | 2–5 | | | 1–2 | 2–3 | 1–4 | 1–2^{SO} | | | | — | | | | | | | | | | |
| ERC Ingolstadt | 6–3 | 3–5 | | 2–3^{SO} | — | | 3–6 | | 3–2^{OT} | 5–8 | 2–6 | | 4–1 | 3–2 | | | | | — | | | | | | | | | |
| Iserlohn Roosters | 2–3^{SO} | | | 5–3 | 3–4 | — | 4–2 | 3–2 | 6–2 | | 2–4 | 4–2 | | 3–2^{OT} | | | | | | — | | | | | | | | |
| Kölner Haie | | 5–6^{SO} | 4–1 | 4–3^{OT} | | 3–2^{SO} | — | | 5–6^{OT} | 2–4 | 4–2 | 1–4^{OT} | | 4–8 | | | | | | | — | | | | | 2–3 | | 1–4 |
| Krefeld Pinguine | 1–2 | 0–4 | 1–3 | | 3–1 | | 0–4 | — | | 2–4 | 2–4 | 5–2 | 4–3 | 4–0 | | | | | | | | — | | | | 6–0 | | |
| Adler Mannheim | | 4–3 | 4–3^{OT} | 3–0 | 5–3 | 6–1 | 4–2 | 4–1 | — | | | 1–2 | 2–1 | | | | | | | | | | — | | | | | |
| EHC Red Bull München | 4–2 | | | 1–4 | 1–5 | 3–2 | 4–3^{OT} | 4–0 | 4–3^{OT} | — | 2–1 | | | | | | | | | | | | | — | | | | |
| Nürnberg Ice Tigers | 4–1 | | 2–1 | | | 3–2^{SO} | | 7–2 | 5–3 | 6–2 | — | 5–0 | 2–3^{SO} | 8–1 | | | | | | | | | 2–5 | | — | | | |
| Schwenninger Wild Wings | 4–5 | 1–4 | 4–2 | 0–5 | 3–4^{OT} | | 2–1 | 4–3^{OT} | | 3–4 | | — | 2–4 | | | | | | | | | | | | | — | | |
| Straubing Tigers | | 4–6 | 4–3 | 5–1 | 4–1 | 11–4 | 3–5 | 3–6 | | 4–2 | | | — | 3–2 | | | | | | | | | | | | | — | |
| Grizzlys Wolfsburg | 0–4 | 4–3^{SO} | 3–2 | | 1–4 | 7–2 | | 2–1^{SO} | 4–1 | 4–3^{SO} | | 3–4^{OT} | | — | | | | | | | | | | | | | | — |

Updated to match(es) played on 22 November 2026. Source: DEL
Legend: Blue = home team win; Red = away team win.
Matches with lighter background shading and a superscript "OT" or "SO" were decided after overtime or in a shootout, respectively.

== Playoffs ==
=== Bracket ===
First round
7
10
8
9

Quarterfinals
1
2
3
6
4
5

Semifinals
(Pairings are re-seeded after the first and second round)

Finals
