= Marcel Brandt =

German ice hockey player (born 1992)

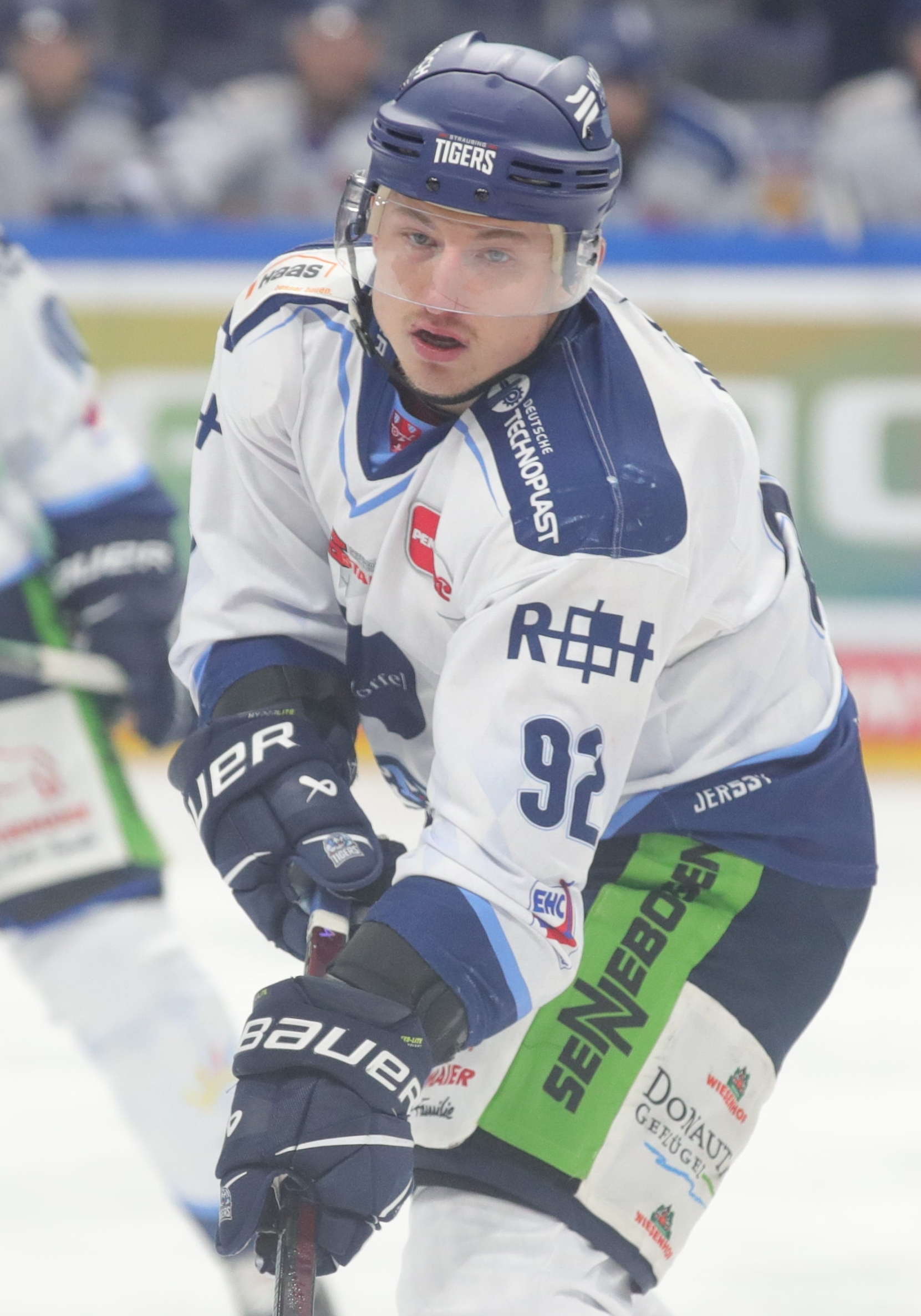
- Marcel Brandt in 2022
- Born: 8 May 1992 (age 34) Dingolfing, Germany
- Height: 1.76 m (5 ft 9 in)
- Weight: 80 kg (176 lb; 12 st 8 lb)
- Position: Defence
- Shoots: Left
- DEL team Former teams: Straubing Tigers; Düsseldorfer EG
- National team: Germany
- Playing career: 2011–present

Marcel Brandt (born 8 May 1992) is a German professional ice hockey player for the Straubing Tigers of the Deutsche Eishockey Liga (DEL) and the German national team.

Brandt represented Germany at the 2021 IIHF World Championship.

Brandt was named to the All-Star team at the 2024 Spengler Cup.
