= Stephan Daschner =

German ice hockey defenceman

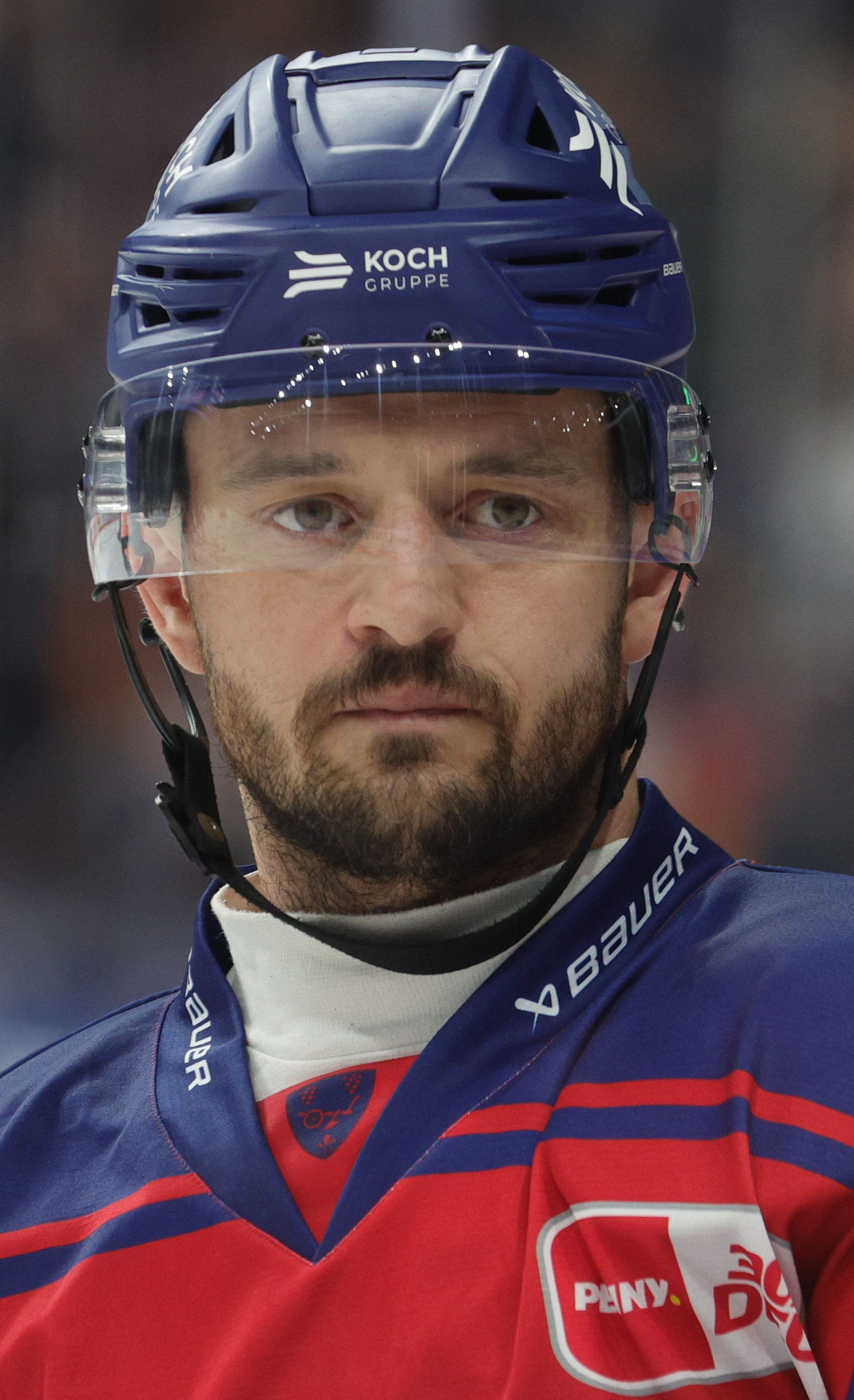
- Daschner in 2024
- Born: August 5, 1988 (age 36); Ingolstadt, West Germany
- Height: 5 ft 10 in (178 cm)
- Weight: 192 lb (87 kg; 13 st 10 lb)
- Position: Defence
- Shoots: Right
- DEL team Former teams: Straubing Tigers; ERC Ingolstadt; Hannover Scorpions; Düsseldorfer EG
- National team: Germany
- Playing career: 2006–present

Stephan Daschner (born August 5, 1988) is a German professional ice hockey defenceman. He is currently playing for the Straubing Tigers in the Deutsche Eishockey Liga (DEL). He has formerly played for ERC Ingolstadt, Hannover Scorpions and Düsseldorfer EG.

On March 26, 2018, after four seasons with DEG, Daschner signed as a free agent to a one-year deal with the Straubing Tigers.
