= Jacob de la Rose =

Swedish ice hockey player (born 1995)

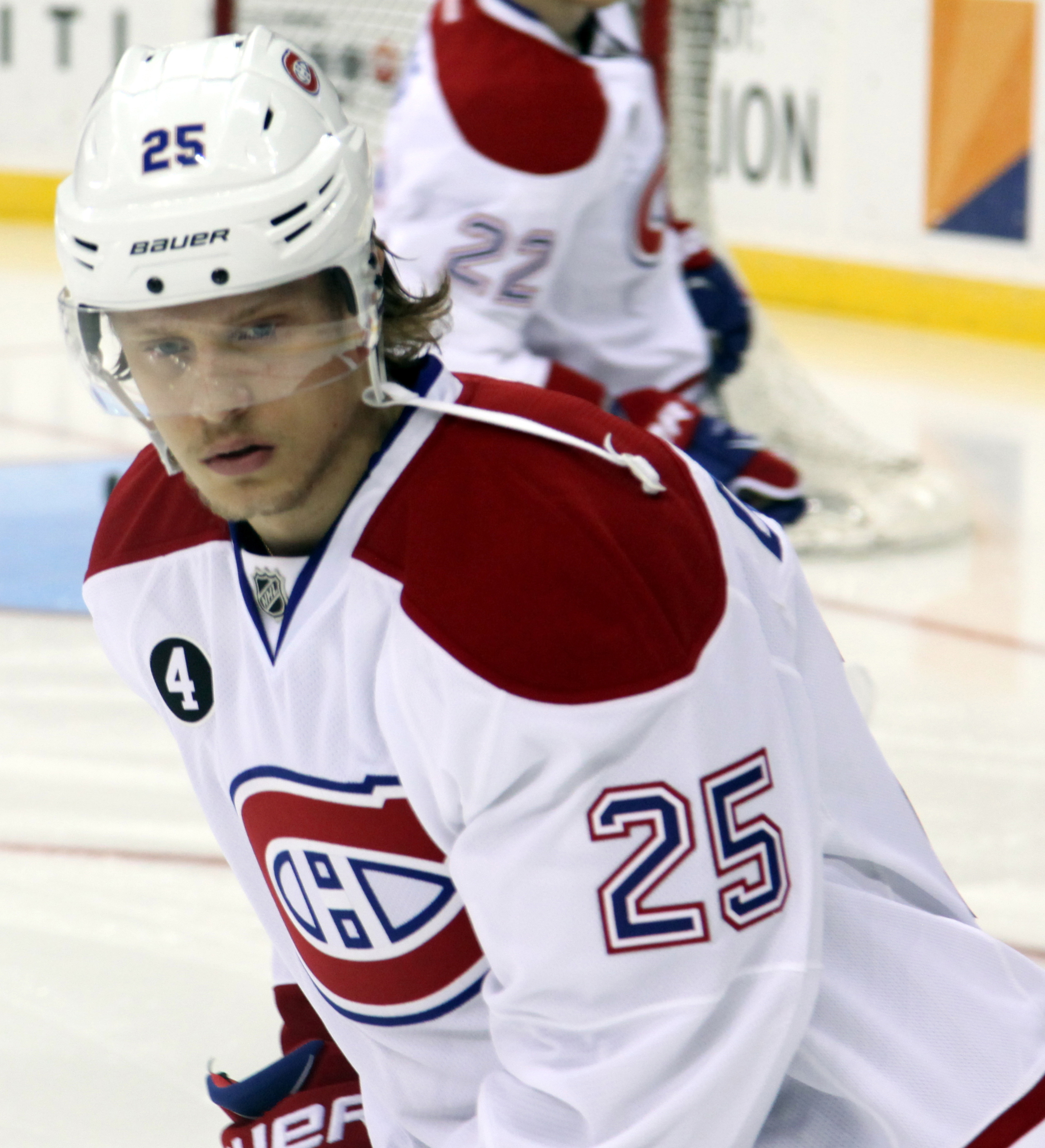
- de la Rose with the Montreal Canadiens in 2015
- Born: 20 May 1995 (age 31) Arvika, Sweden
- Height: 6 ft 3 in (191 cm)
- Weight: 215 lb (98 kg; 15 st 5 lb)
- Position: Forward
- Shoots: Left
- NL team Former teams: HC Fribourg-Gottéron; Leksands IF; Montreal Canadiens; Detroit Red Wings; St. Louis Blues; Färjestad BK
- National team: Sweden
- NHL draft: 34th overall, 2013; Montreal Canadiens
- Playing career: 2012–present

Jacob Waldemar de la Rose (born 20 May 1995) is a Swedish professional ice hockey player who is a forward for HC Fribourg-Gottéron of the National League (NL). He was selected in the second round, 34th overall, by the Montreal Canadiens in the 2013 NHL entry draft. De la Rose has also previously played for the Detroit Red Wings and St. Louis Blues.

Since 2010, de la Rose has played for the Swedish national teams at the junior levels, winning silver medals at the 2012 IIHF World U18 Championships and the 2013 World Junior Ice Hockey Championships.

On 19 March 2019, de la Rose was sent to hospital with an accelerated heartbeat. It was the second time he'd suffered such an episode during the season. The previous event occurred during the 2018-19 NHL preseason while he was a member of the Montreal Canadiens. After the second episode, he was shut down for the remainder of the season and underwent a surgical procedure on his heart in April to correct the problem. He reported for training camp with the Red Wings in September 2019 - prepared to return to regular play.

== Playing career ==
De la Rose was selected in the second round, 34th overall, at the 2013 NHL entry draft by the Montreal Canadiens. Montreal had acquired the draft pick as the result of a trade occurring on 27 February 2012 that sent Andrei Kostitsyn to the Nashville Predators in return for this pick and the cancellation of another fifth-round pick that they had previously given to Nashville in a trade involving Hal Gill ten days earlier, on 17 February. Before being drafted, de la Rose was the seventh-ranked European skater by the NHL Central Scouting Bureau's 2013 final draft scouting report; he was the tenth European picked.

In 2013's European Import Draft, which took place on 3 July, the Windsor Spitfires of the Ontario Hockey League (OHL) chose de la Rose 11th overall. Though Spitfires General Manager Warren Rychel believed that de la Rose would immediately make the transition to North American major junior hockey, he ended up remaining in Sweden to fulfill the last year of his contract with Leksands IF.

=== Professional ===
De la Rose played for Leksands IF from the 2011–12 season to the 2013–14 season. He played 87 games over that time, recording 25 points. He became — and remains — good friends with former Leksand teammate Filip Forsberg, who was also his two-time World Junior captain with Sweden.

In the 2014–15 season, de la Rose made the transition to North America and began his Canadiens career in the American Hockey League (AHL) with their affiliate, the Hamilton Bulldogs. He scored his first AHL goal on Joni Ortio in a 4–3 loss against the Adirondack Flames. De la Rose registered his first NHL point in his fifth NHL game on 12 February 2015, an assist on a Christian Thomas goal, which coincidentally happened to be his first NHL goal.

De la Rose began the 2018–19 season on the injury reserve list after suffering a cardiac episode following a pre-season game with the Canadiens. In his return to health, de la Rose was placed on waivers and claimed by the Detroit Red Wings on 17 October 2018. He scored his first goal as a Red Wing in a game against the Edmonton Oilers on 3 November 2018. He would go on to play 60 games with Detroit, scoring three goals and six assists. On 19 March 2019, de la Rose stayed overnight in a hospital after suffering a cardiac episode during a game against the New York Rangers. The following month, he underwent treatment to correct his accelerated heartbeat issue.

On 6 November 2019, de la Rose was traded to the St. Louis Blues in exchange for Robby Fabbri. He appeared in 34 games for the club, recording 6 points. On 10 September 2020, the Blues re-signed de la Rose to a one-year, $700,000 contract extension.

Following his seventh season in the NHL, de la Rose opted to return to Sweden as an impending unrestricted free agent, agreeing to a three-year contract with SHL club, Färjestad BK, on 1 June 2021.

After claiming the Swedish Championship in his first season with Färjestad BK, de la Rose opted to leave the SHL and join Swiss club HC Fribourg-Gottéron of the NL for the 2022–23 season on 9 March 2022.

== International play ==
Medal record

Men's ice hockey

Representing Sweden

World Championships
Gold medal – first place	2018 Denmark	

World Junior Championships
Silver medal – second place	2013 Ufa, Russia	
Silver medal – second place	2014 Malmö, Sweden	

De la Rose represented the Swedish under-18 team, winning the silver medal during the 2012 IIHF World U18 Championships. He also participated in the under-18 championships the following year, in which he captained the team to a fifth-place finish.

In addition to the 2013 under-18 tournament, de la Rose participated in the 2013 World Junior Championships earlier that year. The following year, he played in the 2014 World Junior Championships, held in his home country. In both years, the Swedes captured the silver medal.

De la Rose then served as Sweden's captain during the 2015 World Junior Championships where Sweden finished in fourth place, failing to win a medal.

== Personal life ==
De la Rose's father, Anders, is a former ice hockey player and youth coach. Playing from 1994 through 1996, Anders participated in 43 games and had 17 total points with the Arvika HC, formally of Sweden's Division 1 league.

De la Rose's older brother, Erik, is playing as a defenceman for Vítkovice Ridera of the Czech Extraliga (ELH). Jacob also has a sister, Matilda de la Rose.

In 2017, de la Rose purchased a five-year-old female Italian race horse named Trilly of Nando with friend and fellow hockey player Patric Skoglund, later adding Filip Forsberg of the Nashville Predators to the ownership group.

== Career statistics ==
=== Regular season and playoffs ===
			Regular season					Playoffs
Season	Team	League	GP	G	A	Pts	PIM	GP	G	A	Pts	PIM
2009–10	Färjestad BK	J18	3	0	0	0	2	—	—	—	—	—
2009–10	Färjestad BK	J18 Allsv	3	0	0	0	0	7	0	0	0	0
2010–11	Leksands IF	J18	16	9	8	17	14	—	—	—	—	—
2010–11	Leksands IF	J18 Allsv	14	3	5	8	8	6	0	4	4	4
2010–11	Leksands IF	J20	2	1	0	1	0	—	—	—	—	—
2011–12	Leksands IF	J18	3	3	3	6	2	—	—	—	—	—
2011–12	Leksands IF	J18 Allsv	1	0	0	0	4	—	—	—	—	—
2011–12	Leksands IF	J20	28	4	9	13	24	—	—	—	—	—
2011–12	Leksands IF	Allsv	14	2	0	2	8	10	2	0	2	4
2012–13	Leksands IF	J20	4	1	4	5	0	—	—	—	—	—
2012–13	Leksands IF	Allsv	38	6	6	12	31	10	0	1	1	2
2013–14	Leksands IF	J20	—	—	—	—	—	3	2	1	3	2
2013–14	Leksands IF	SHL	49	7	6	13	18	3	0	0	0	0
2014–15	Hamilton Bulldogs	AHL	37	6	5	11	11	—	—	—	—	—
2014–15	Montreal Canadiens	NHL	33	4	2	6	12	12	0	0	0	4
2015–16	St. John's IceCaps	AHL	34	7	7	14	18	—	—	—	—	—
2015–16	Montreal Canadiens	NHL	22	0	1	1	6	—	—	—	—	—
2016–17	St. John's IceCaps	AHL	62	14	17	31	38	4	1	2	3	6
2016–17	Montreal Canadiens	NHL	9	0	0	0	4	—	—	—	—	—
2017–18	Montreal Canadiens	NHL	55	4	8	12	29	—	—	—	—	—
2018–19	Detroit Red Wings	NHL	60	3	6	9	16	—	—	—	—	—
2019–20	Detroit Red Wings	NHL	16	1	3	4	4	—	—	—	—	—
2019–20	St. Louis Blues	NHL	34	1	4	5	6	5	0	0	0	0
2020–21	St. Louis Blues	NHL	13	0	1	1	7	—	—	—	—	—
2021–22	Färjestad BK	SHL	47	6	10	16	26	19	3	2	5	39
2022–23	HC Fribourg-Gottéron	NL	49	12	11	23	18	2	1	0	1	2
SHL totals			96	13	16	29	44	22	3	2	5	39
NHL totals			242	13	25	38	84	17	0	0	0	4

=== International ===
Year	Team	Event	Result	GP	G	A	Pts	PIM
2011	Sweden	IH18	2nd place, silver medalist(s)	5	0	0	0	0
2012	Sweden	U17	4th	6	1	4	5	4
2012	Sweden	WJC18	2nd place, silver medalist(s)	6	1	2	3	4
2012	Sweden	IH18	3rd place, bronze medalist(s)	5	2	2	4	20
2013	Sweden	WJC	2nd place, silver medalist(s)	6	0	0	0	22
2013	Sweden	WJC18	5th	5	1	2	3	29
2014	Sweden	WJC	2nd place, silver medalist(s)	7	3	3	6	6
2015	Sweden	WJC	4th	7	2	2	4	4
2018	Sweden	WC	1st place, gold medalist(s)	10	1	1	2	0
2022	Sweden	OG	4th	6	0	0	0	4
2024	HC Fribourg-Gottéron	Spengler Cup	1st place, gold medalist(s)	4	3	2	5	2
2026	Sweden	WC	7th	8	2	1	3	0
Junior totals				47	10	15	25	89
Senior totals				28	6	4	10	6

== Awards and honours ==
Award	Year	Ref
SHL
Le Mat Trophy champion	2022	
International
Spengler Cup All-Star Team	2024	
