= Patrik Virta =

Finnish ice hockey player

- Born: 6 March 1996 (age 29) Hämeenlinna, Finland
- Height: 5 ft 10 in (178 cm)
- Weight: 181 lb (82 kg; 12 st 13 lb)
- Position: Forward
- Shoots: Right
- Liiga team Former teams: Oulun Kärpät; HPK; TPS; HC Slovan Bratislava; Örebro HK; Tappara; ERC Ingolstadt
- NHL draft: 208th overall, 2017; New York Rangers
- Playing career: 2014–present

Patrik Virta (born 6 March 1996) is a Finnish professional ice hockey forward who plays for Oulun Kärpät in Liiga. Virta was selected by the New York Rangers in the 2017 NHL Entry Draft.

== Playing career ==
Virta made his professional debut in his native Finland, appearing in the Liiga playing with his original youth club, HPK during the 2014–15 season.

Following a break out 2016–17 season with TPS, scoring 14 goals and 26 points in 49 contests, Virta was selected as an overage prospect by the New York Rangers in the seventh round, 208th overall, in the 2017 NHL Entry Draft on 26 June 2017. He continued his development in the 2017–18 season, matching his 14 goals scores while improving his offensive output to 40 points in 58 games.

Without a contract offer from the Rangers, Virta opted leave the Liiga and continue his development in the Kontinental Hockey League (KHL), securing a one-year contract with Slovak club, HC Slovan Bratislava, on 17 July 2018. Virta later reached a mutual contract termination with Slovan and signed with Örebro HK in the Swedish Hockey League. In joining Örebro during the 2018-19 season, Virta immediately adjusted within the team, scoring 7 goals and 15 points in 37 games.

On 19 June 2019, Virta returned to the Liiga as a free agent, agreeing to a two-year contract with Tappara.

Virta played four seasons with Tappara before leaving Finland to sign a one-year contract with German club, ERC Ingolstadt of the Deutsche Eishockey Liga (DEL), on 14 June 2023.

== Career statistics ==
			Regular season					Playoffs
Season	Team	League	GP	G	A	Pts	PIM	GP	G	A	Pts	PIM
2013–14	HPK	Jr. A	32	15	14	29	8	3	0	0	0	2
2014–15	HPK	Jr. A	43	29	46	75	55	12	10	5	15	10
2014–15	HPK	Liiga	5	2	0	2	2	—	—	—	—	—
2015–16	TPS	Jr. A	2	0	1	1	2	—	—	—	—	—
2015–16	TPS	Liiga	33	2	2	4	8	1	0	0	0	0
2015–16	TUTO Hockey	Mestis	4	1	1	2	4	—	—	—	—	—
2015–16	SaPKo	Mestis	7	2	2	4	2	5	2	2	4	0
2016–17	TPS	Liiga	49	14	12	26	22	6	5	1	6	4
2017–18	TPS	Liiga	58	14	26	40	24	8	2	1	3	0
2018–19	Slovan Bratislava	KHL	21	2	7	9	6	—	—	—	—	—
2018–19	Örebro HK	SHL	37	7	8	15	10	2	1	0	1	0
2019–20	Tappara	Liiga	42	13	10	23	20	—	—	—	—	—
2020–21	Tappara	Liiga	56	21	15	36	42	9	0	0	0	10
2021–22	Tappara	Liiga	54	17	19	36	38	15	3	2	5	12
2022–23	Tappara	Liiga	41	6	12	18	24	2	0	0	0	0
2023–24	ERC Ingolstadt	DEL	43	9	11	20	8	7	1	1	2	4
Liiga totals			338	89	96	185	180	41	10	4	14	26
