= Reto Berra =

Swiss ice hockey player (born 1987)

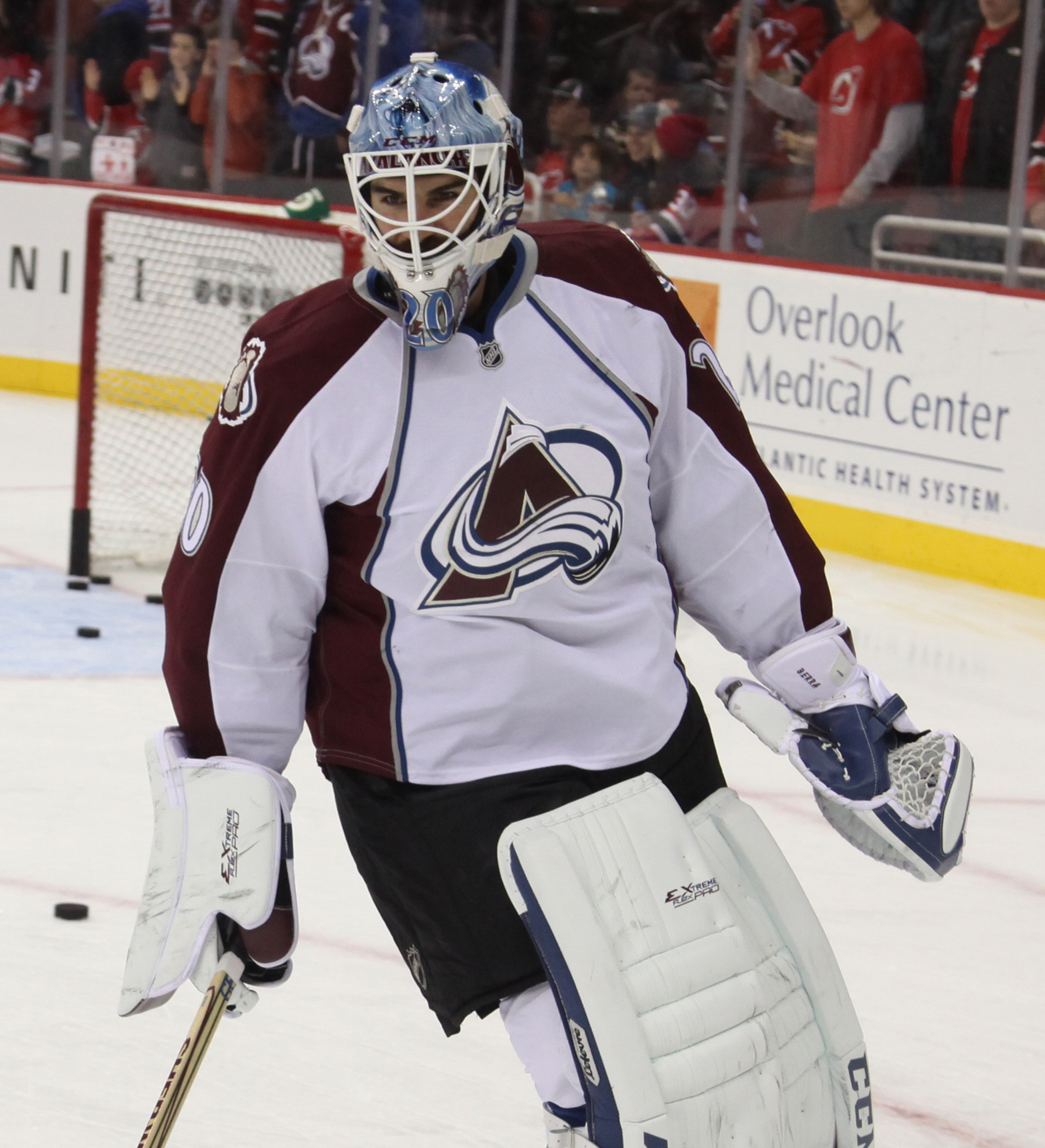
- Berra in November 2014
- Born: 3 January 1987 (age 39) Bülach, Switzerland
- Height: 6 ft 5 in (196 cm)
- Weight: 210 lb (95 kg; 15 st 0 lb)
- Position: Goaltender
- Catches: Left
- NL team Former teams: EHC Kloten; ZSC Lions; HC Davos; SCL Tigers; EV Zug; EHC Biel; Calgary Flames; Colorado Avalanche; Florida Panthers; Anaheim Ducks; HC Fribourg-Gottéron
- National team: Switzerland
- NHL draft: 106th overall, 2006; St. Louis Blues
- Playing career: 2003–present

Reto Berra (born 3 January 1987) is a Swiss professional ice hockey player who is a goaltender for EHC Kloten of the National League (NL). Berra played seven seasons in Switzerland's National League A, spending time with the GCK Lions, HC Davos and SCL Tigers before joining EHC Biel in 2009, where he was the team's starting goaltender for four years. He was an NHL draft pick of the St. Louis Blues, selected in the fourth round of the 2006 NHL entry draft and was traded to the Calgary Flames, with whom he made his NHL debut in 2013–14. Internationally, Berra has played with the Swiss national team on several occasions; he has appeared in two World Championships. At the 2013 tournament, he shared goaltending duties with Martin Gerber and helped lead Switzerland to a silver medal, the nation's first medal in 60 years.

== Playing career ==
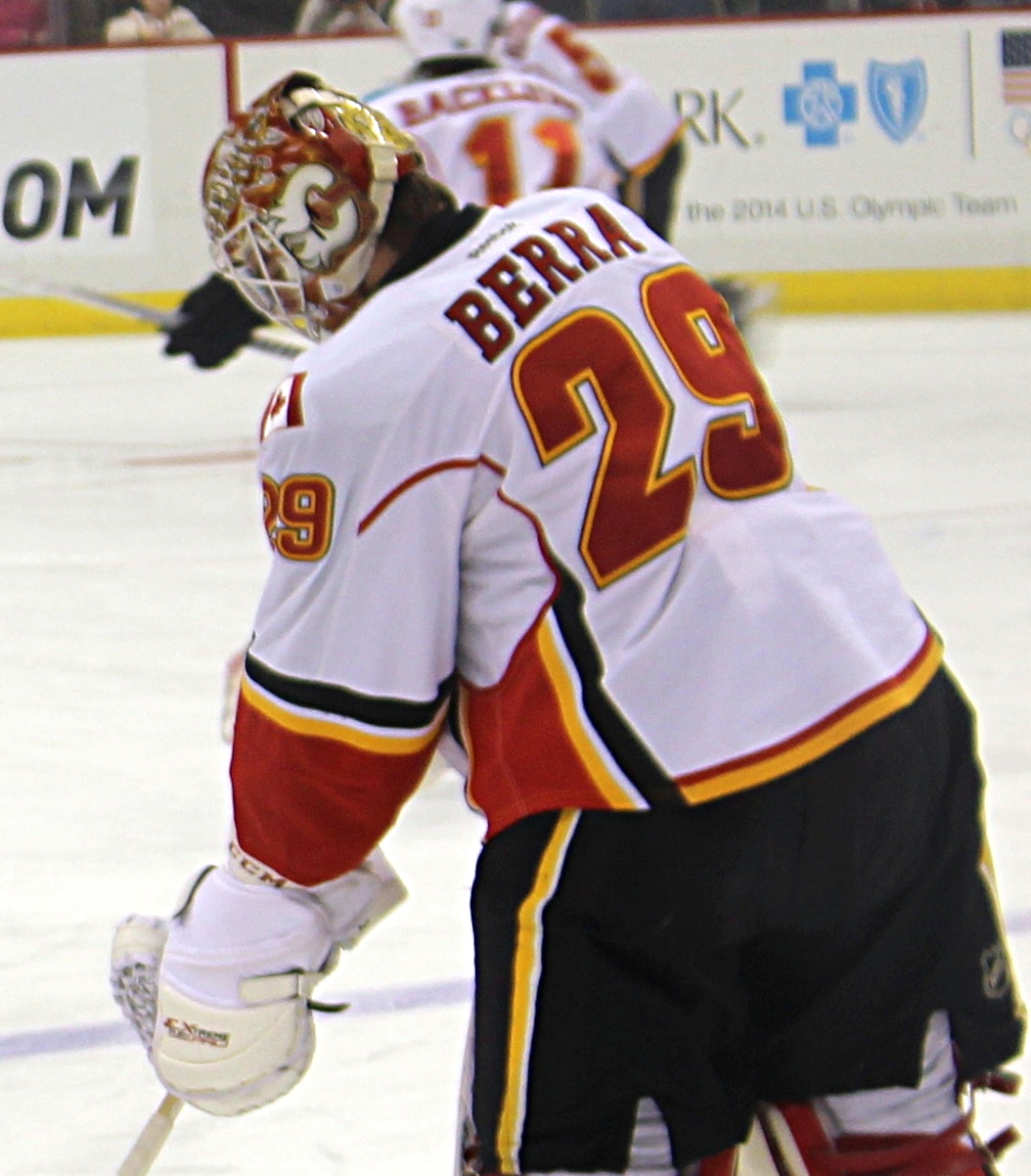
Berra in December 2013

Berra played youth hockey in his home town of Bülach, where he became a goaltender full-time at age 11. He played in the 2001 Quebec International Pee-Wee Hockey Tournament with a youth team from Zürich.

Berra played his first professional game in 2003–04 in the National League B (NLB) for GCK Lions, and two years later played his first National League A (NLA) games with ZSC Lions. He caught the attention of the St. Louis Blues during the 2006 World Junior Ice Hockey Championships, and the team selected him with their fourth-round pick, 106th overall, at the 2006 National Hockey League (NHL) Entry Draft. Berra opted to remain in Switzerland, where he was the backup goaltender for the Lions, SCL Tigers and HC Davos. He was a member of HC Davos' Swiss championship team in 2009.

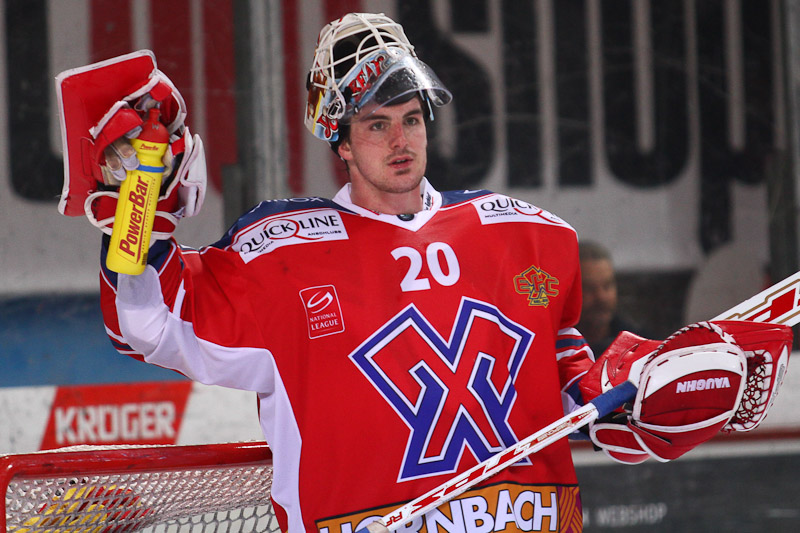
Berra with EHC Biel in 2010

Moving to EHC Biel for the 2009–10 NLA season, Berra became the team's starting goaltender and appeared in 40 games, posting a win–loss record of 16–20 and a goals against average (GAA) of 3.36. He improved over the following seasons, culminating in 2011–12 when he was named the NLA's goaltender of the year after posting a 23–26 record with Biel and a 2.45 GAA. As he played with Biel in the 2012–13 NLA season, Berra's NHL playing rights were traded by the Blues on 1 April 2013. The Calgary Flames acquired his rights, along with Mark Cundari and a first-round draft selection, in exchange for defenceman Jay Bouwmeester.

After completing his fourth season with Biel, Berra believed his career had progressed to the point where he could succeed in North America. He signed a one-year contract with Calgary for the 2013–14 NHL season. The Flames wanted Berra to gain playing experience in North America and assigned him to their American Hockey League (AHL) affiliate, the Abbotsford Heat to start the season. After nine appearances with the Heat in which he recorded a 2.66 GAA, and a .908 save percentage, Berra was recalled to Calgary. Berra made his NHL debut on 3 November 2013, making 42 saves for his first win as the Flames defeated the defending Stanley Cup champion Chicago Blackhawks, 3–2.

Berra appeared in 29 games for the Flames and posted a 9–17–2 record with a 2.95 GAA. On 5 March 2014, the Flames traded him to the Colorado Avalanche in exchange for a second-round draft pick. Before making his debut with the Avalanche and as an impending free agent at season's end, Berra was signed to a three-year contract extension to assume the backup role to Semyon Varlamov on 13 March 2014.

On 16 January 2015, while playing for the Lake Erie Monsters, Berra became the 11th goalie in AHL history to score a goal when he shot the puck the length of the ice to score in an empty net against the Chicago Wolves.

Approaching the final year of his contract and having been surpassed to third choice on the depth chart by Calvin Pickard, Berra was traded by the Avalanche to the Florida Panthers in exchange for Rocco Grimaldi on 23 June 2016. In the following 2016–17 season, as the Panthers third-string option as was assigned to inaugural AHL affiliate, the Springfield Thunderbirds. Berra led the Thunderbirds with 12 wins in 31 games and was recalled to the Panthers to play out the regular season, appearing in 7 games.

On 11 February 2017, Berra agreed to a three-year contract with HC Fribourg-Gottéron of the National League for a reported worth of CHF 3.5 million. The contract would start from the 2017–18 season. On 5 July 2017, it was announced that Berra had used his NHL out clause in securing a one-year, one-way contract with the Anaheim Ducks. The remaining two years of his contract with Fribourg-Gottéron would remain valid.

Upon completing the 2017–18 season, having appeared in 5 games with the Ducks primarily as the club's third-string goaltender, Berra was announced to return to HC Fribourg-Gottéron to begin the previously agreed contract on 1 May 2018.

On 22 August 2019, Berra was signed to a four-year contract extension with Fribourg-Gottéron worth CHF 3.2 million through the 2023-24 season. In 2024, he re-signed with Fribourg-Gottéron with a two-year deal that lasts until 2026. Berra backstopped Fribourg-Gottéron to their first Spengler Cup title in 2024.

After eight seasons Berra would conclude his tenure with Fribourg-Gottéron, and was signed as a free agent to extend his career on a two-year contract with EHC Kloten on 23 August 2025.

== International play ==
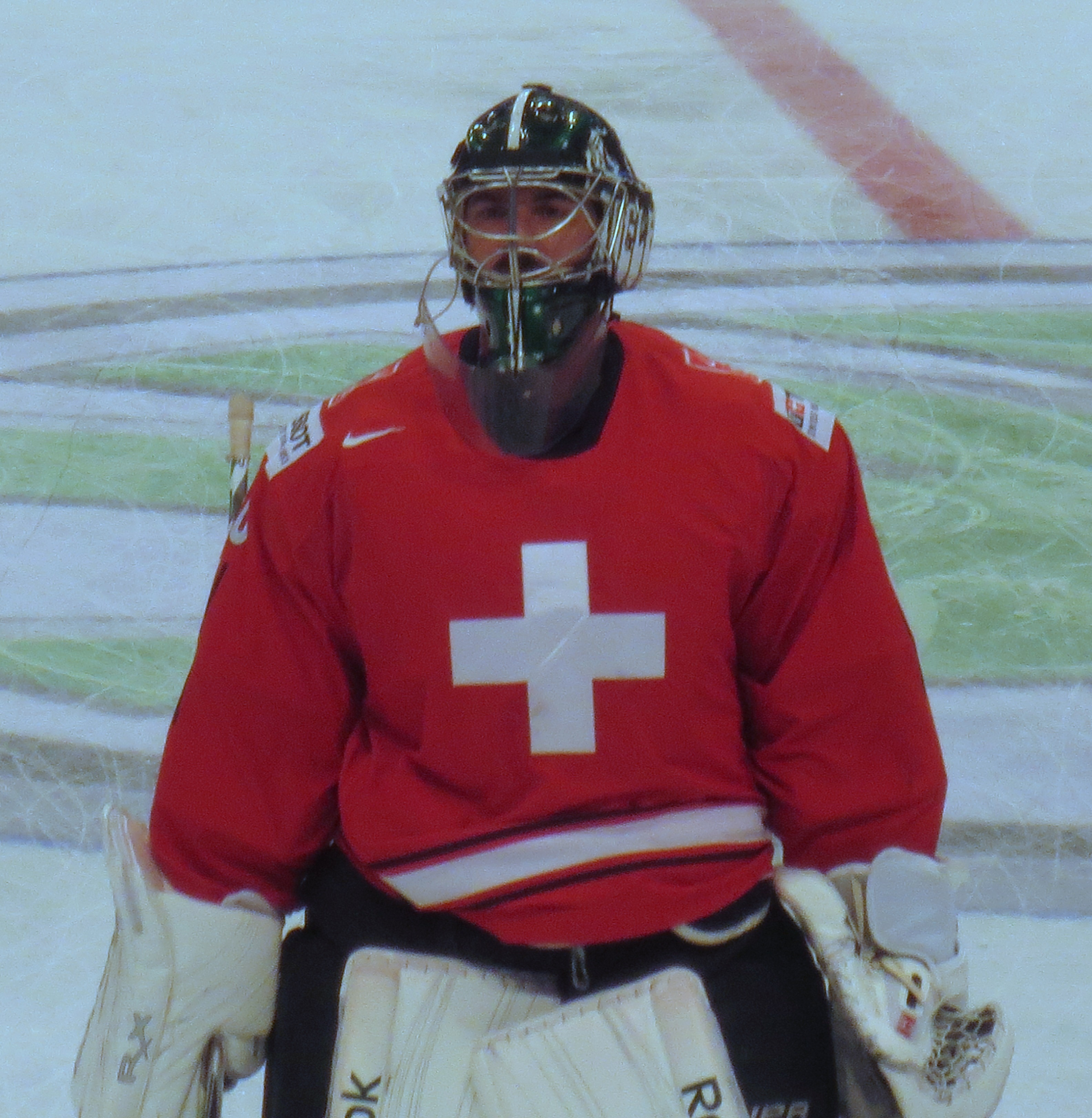
- Berra at the 2013 IIHF World Championship

Medal record

Representing Switzerland

World Championships
Silver medal – second place	2013 Sweden/Finland	
Silver medal – second place	2018 Denmark	
Silver medal – second place	2024 Czechia	
Silver medal – second place	2026 Switzerland	

Berra has represented Switzerland at several international tournaments. He played with the national junior team three times; the first was at the 2005 IIHF World U18 Championships, where Berra appeared in two games, winning one, for the ninth-place Swiss. He also played in two World Junior Championships, appearing in all six of his nation's games each in 2006 and 2007 as Switzerland finished seventh both years. With the senior team, Berra appeared in four of his nation's seven games at the 2012 IIHF World Championship where he posted a record of 1–3 and had a GAA of 3.01.

At the 2013 IIHF World Championship, Berra split goaltending duties with Martin Gerber. Berra appeared in four games, winning all four and posting a GAA of 1.00. The unheralded Swiss team went on a "Cinderella run" at the championship, winning their first nine games of the tournament. The ninth win came in the semi-final as Berra led his team to an upset win over the United States. He recorded a shutout in a 3–0 win that guaranteed the Swiss their first World Championship medal in 60 years. Berra described the victory: "I think it's the biggest win since a long, long time for Switzerland, and also, I think for a lot of players, it was the most important game in their life today." The tournament ended in disappointment for the Swiss as, with Gerber in goal, they lost the gold medal game, 5–1 to Sweden. The silver medal matched the best finish in Swiss history.

Hiller and Berra returned to the Swiss team for the 2014 Winter Olympics. Berra appeared in one of Switzerland's four games, a 1–0 defeat.

He represented Switzerland at the 2024 IIHF World Championship and won a silver medal.

== Career statistics ==
=== Regular season and playoffs ===
			Regular season									Playoffs
Season	Team	League	GP	W	L	T/OT	MIN	GA	SO	GAA	SV%	GP	W	L	MIN	GA	SO	GAA	SV%
2003–04	GCK Lions	NLB	1	0	0	0	15	0	0	0.00	1.000	—	—	—	—	—	—	—	—
2004–05	GCK Lions	NLB	3	2	1	0	180	12	0	4.00	—	—	—	—	—	—	—	—	—
2005–06	GCK Lions	NLB	11	2	7	0	504	26	1	3.10	—	—	—	—	—	—	—	—	—
2005–06	ZSC Lions	NLA	2	0	1	0	87	4	0	2.76	—	—	—	—	—	—	—	—	—
2006–07	GCK Lions	NLB	17	12	5	0	989	46	1	2.79	—	—	—	—	—	—	—	—	—
2006–07	ZSC Lions	NLA	2	1	0	0	78	4	0	3.08	—	4	0	3	188	9	0	2.87	—
2007–08	HC Davos	NLA	17	10	7	0	1027	45	0	2.63	—	—	—	—	—	—	—	—	—
2008–09	HC Davos	NLA	8	3	2	2	444	20	0	2.70	—	4	3	1	216	5	0	1.39	—
2008–09	SCL Tigers	NLA	2	1	1	0	120	9	0	4.50	—	—	—	—	—	—	—	—	—
2008–09	EV Zug	NLA	6	1	2	2	368	17	0	2.77	—	—	—	—	—	—	—	—	—
2009–10	EHC Biel	NLA	39	14	17	2	2239	123	3	3.30	—	9	2	7	524	34	0	3.89	—
2010–11	EHC Biel	NLA	41	13	19	3	2457	126	3	3.08	.874	—	—	—	—	—	—	—	—
2011–12	EHC Biel	NLA	49	20	23	2	2926	119	7	2.44	.911	5	1	4	301	18	0	3.59	.890
2012–13	EHC Biel	NLA	49	20	20	2	2973	149	3	3.01	.906	7	1	4	455	24	0	3.17	.901
2013–14	Calgary Flames	NHL	29	9	17	2	1648	81	0	2.95	.897	—	—	—	—	—	—	—	—
2013–14	Abbotsford Heat	AHL	9	4	3	1	473	21	0	2.66	.908	—	—	—	—	—	—	—	—
2013–14	Colorado Avalanche	NHL	2	0	1	1	72	7	0	5.83	.781	—	—	—	—	—	—	—	—
2014–15	Colorado Avalanche	NHL	19	5	4	1	748	33	1	2.65	.918	—	—	—	—	—	—	—	—
2014–15	Lake Erie Monsters	AHL	5	3	1	1	303	13	0	2.57	.914	—	—	—	—	—	—	—	—
2015–16	Colorado Avalanche	NHL	14	5	8	0	718	29	2	2.41	.922	—	—	—	—	—	—	—	—
2015–16	San Antonio Rampage	AHL	16	7	7	0	884	50	0	3.39	.901	—	—	—	—	—	—	—	—
2016–17	Springfield Thunderbirds	AHL	31	12	14	5	1758	74	3	2.53	.910	—	—	—	—	—	—	—	—
2016–17	Florida Panthers	NHL	7	0	5	0	314	18	0	3.45	.876	—	—	—	—	—	—	—	—
2017–18	Anaheim Ducks	NHL	5	1	1	0	182	7	0	2.31	.926	—	—	—	—	—	—	—	—
2017–18	San Diego Gulls	AHL	32	16	12	2	1779	79	3	2.66	.922	—	—	—	—	—	—	—	—
2018–19	HC Fribourg-Gottéron	NL	45	21	21	1	2632	97	3	2.21	.920	—	—	—	—	—	—	—	—
2019–20	HC Fribourg-Gottéron	NL	44	20	19	2	2616	103	2	2.36	.924	—	—	—	—	—	—	—	—
2020–21	HC Fribourg-Gottéron	NL	45	25	14	2	2652	127	0	2.87	.915	5	1	4	299	19	0	3.81	.882
2021–22	HC Fribourg-Gottéron	NL	43	28	9	3	2552	91	5	2.14	.928	9	4	5	658	26	1	2.37	.914
2022–23	HC Fribourg-Gottéron	NL	16	7	5	1	938	35	2	2.24	.913	2	0	2	117	3	0	1.54	.940
2023–24	HC Fribourg-Gottéron	NL	41	29	9	2	2481	83	1	2.01	.929	12	5	7	765	24	1	1.88	.930
2024–25	HC Fribourg-Gottéron	NL	42	20	12	6	2554	97	3	2.28	.907	14	7	7	863	30	1	1.89	.933
2025–26	HC Fribourg-Gottéron	NL	37	27	6	0	2201	73	5	1.99	.920	19	12	7	1161	41	1	2.12	.923
NHL totals			76	20	36	4	3685	175	3	2.85	.905	—	—	—	—	—	—	—	—

=== International ===
Year	Team	Event	Result	GP	W	L	T/OTL	MIN	GA	SO	GAA	SV%
2005	Switzerland	U18	9th	1	1	1	0	120	9	0	4.50	.885
2006	Switzerland	WJC	7th	6	2	2	2	359	14	0	2.34	.910
2007	Switzerland	WJC	7th	6	3	3	0	360	19	0	3.17	.899
2012	Switzerland	WC	11th	4	1	3	0	239	12	0	3.01	.880
2013	Switzerland	WC	2nd place, silver medalist(s)	4	4	0	0	240	4	1	1.00	.967
2014	Switzerland	OG	9th	1	0	1	0	59	1	0	1.02	.968
2014	Switzerland	WC	10th	6	3	3	0	362	16	0	2.65	.902
2015	Switzerland	WC	8th	5	0	5	0	310	18	0	3.48	.876
2016	Switzerland	WC	11th	6	2	3	0	372	21	0	3.39	.881
2018	Switzerland	WC	2nd place, silver medalist(s)	3	2	1	0	177	6	1	2.03	.917
2019	Switzerland	WC	8th	4	2	1	0	204	7	2	2.06	.916
2021	Switzerland	WC	6th	4	1	3	0	218	6	1	1.65	.912
2022	Switzerland	OG	8th	3	0	3	0	141	8	0	3.41	.887
2022	Switzerland	WC	5th	3	3	0	0	185	7	0	2.27	.883
2024	Switzerland	WC	2nd place, silver medalist(s)	1	1	0	0	40	4	0	6.00	.667
2026	Switzerland	WC	2nd place, silver medalist(s)	2	2	0	0	120	3	0	1.50	.925
Junior totals				13	6	6	2	839	42	0	3.00	.900
Senior totals				44	19	23	0	2,667	113	5	2.54	.901
