= David Musil =

Canadian born-Czech ice hockey player (born 1993)

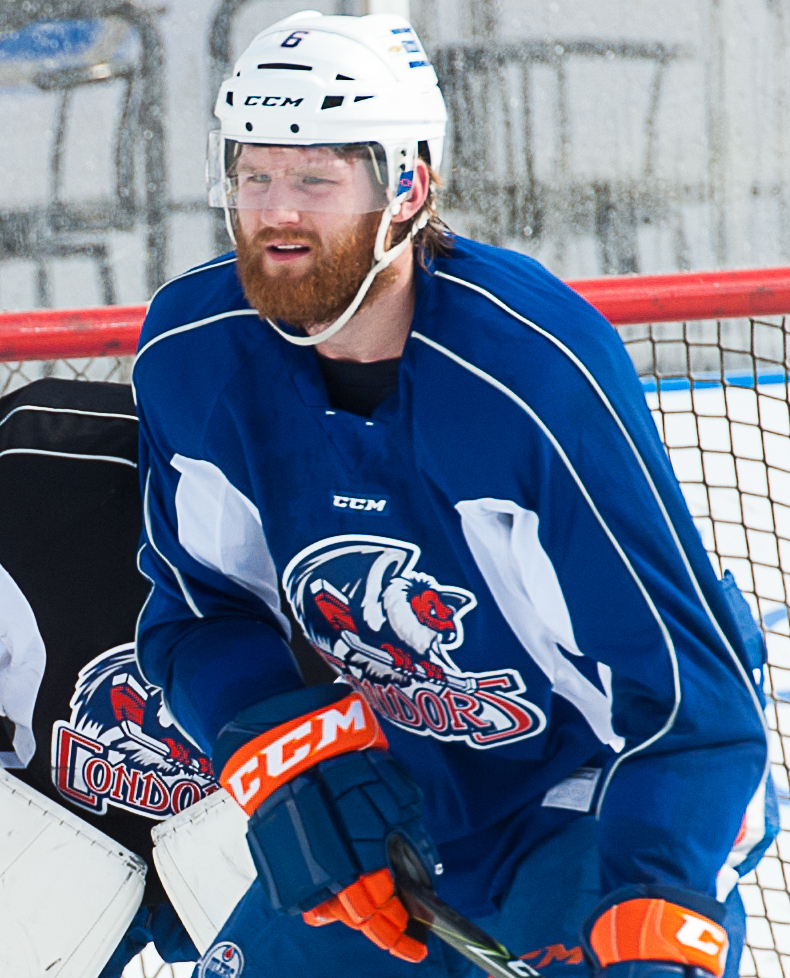
- Musil with the Bakersfield Condors in 2017
- Born: April 9, 1993 (age 33) Calgary, Alberta, Canada
- Height: 6 ft 4 in (193 cm)
- Weight: 207 lb (94 kg; 14 st 11 lb)
- Position: Defence
- Shoots: Left
- ELH team Former teams: HC Dynamo Pardubice; Edmonton Oilers
- National team: Czech Republic
- NHL draft: 31st overall, 2011; Edmonton Oilers
- Playing career: 2009–present

David Musil (born April 9, 1993) is a Canadian born-Czech ice hockey player who is currently playing under contract to HC Dynamo Pardubice in the Czech Extraliga (ELH). He was a second-round selection of the Edmonton Oilers in the 2011 NHL entry draft. SKA Saint Petersburg picked Musil in the first round, 12th overall of the 2010 KHL Junior Draft. He played junior hockey in the Western Hockey League for the Vancouver Giants and the Edmonton Oil Kings. Musil was born in Canada, and raised in the Czech Republic. He represents the Czech Republic in international play.

== Playing career ==
Musil played in the 2005 and 2006 Quebec International Pee-Wee Hockey Tournaments with a youth team from Chomutov.

Musil started his junior ice hockey career in the Western Hockey League (WHL) in a circuitous fashion, as he was initially passed over in the league's bantam draft because he was not living in Canada. Knowing the family would soon be moving to Vancouver, his father Frank approached the Vancouver Giants about "listing" Musil to obtain his rights. After this news became public, other teams in the WHL protested, and the league decided to hold a lottery draft specifically to determine Musil's initial destination in the league. The Kootenay Ice won the draft and Musil's WHL rights. They promptly traded him to Vancouver, as Musil had made it clear he wished to play in his new hometown.

During his rookie season in the WHL, Musil played in 71 games with the Giants, scoring 7 goals and adding 25 assists. Vancouver's director of player personnel, James Ripplinger, praised Musil's play during the season, "His poise with the puck when being pressured, not making any mistakes; he was such a reliable player."

During the 2011 NHL entry draft, he got drafted in the second round, 31st overall by the Edmonton Oilers. On June 30, 2012, he signed his entry-level contract (three years) with the Oilers. During the 2014–15 season, the Oilers recalled him and he made his NHL debut on April 4, 2016, against the Calgary Flames. He recorded his first point, an assist in his second game.

On July 29, 2016, he re-signed a one-year, two-way deal with the Oilers. In the 2016–17 season, Musil amassed 4 goals and 14 points in 47 games with the Bakersfield Condors before he was reassigned by the Oilers to fellow AHL club, the Tucson Roadrunners in exchange for Mark Olver on March 6, 2017.

As a free agent from the Oilers, Musil opted to return to his native country after 8 seasons abroad, agreeing to a one-year deal with HC Oceláři Třinec of the Extraliga on July 31, 2017.

== International play ==
Despite being born in Canada, Musil represents the Czech Republic in international play. He has represented his country at the IIHF World Junior Championships twice, in 2012 and 2013. Earlier in his career, he was a likely pick to play in the 2011 tournament, before he broke his foot blocking a shot in a WHL game.

== Personal life ==
He is the son of former NHL player Frank Musil. His uncle, Bobby Holík, also played in the NHL, and his grandfather, Jaroslav Holík, competed in ice hockey at the 1972 Winter Olympics with the Czechoslovakia national ice hockey team. His mother, Andrea Holíková, was an accomplished tennis player. His brother, Adam was drafted by the St. Louis Blues in the 2015 NHL Entry Draft.

== Career statistics ==
=== Regular season and playoffs ===
			Regular season					Playoffs
Season	Team	League	GP	G	A	Pts	PIM	GP	G	A	Pts	PIM
2009–10	Vancouver Giants	WHL	71	7	25	32	67	16	2	2	4	8
2010–11	Vancouver Giants	WHL	62	6	19	25	83	4	0	1	1	2
2011–12	Vancouver Giants	WHL	59	6	21	27	104	—	—	—	—	—
2012–13	Vancouver Giants	WHL	14	2	6	8	18	—	—	—	—	—
2012–13	Edmonton Oil Kings	WHL	48	7	16	23	56	22	0	6	6	26
2013–14	Oklahoma City Barons	AHL	61	2	10	12	54	2	0	1	1	0
2013–14	Bakersfield Condors	ECHL	3	1	0	1	2	—	—	—	—	—
2014–15	Oklahoma City Barons	AHL	65	2	9	11	35	6	0	0	0	6
2014–15	Edmonton Oilers	NHL	4	0	2	2	2	—	—	—	—	—
2015–16	Bakersfield Condors	AHL	67	3	11	14	39	—	—	—	—	—
2016–17	Bakersfield Condors	AHL	47	4	10	14	34	—	—	—	—	—
2016–17	Tucson Roadrunners	AHL	13	0	4	4	6	—	—	—	—	—
2017–18	HC Oceláři Třinec	ELH	52	1	5	6	22	18	0	1	1	28
2018–19	HC Oceláři Třinec	ELH	51	1	13	14	51	17	1	3	4	12
2019–20	HC Oceláři Třinec	ELH	48	1	11	12	52	—	—	—	—	—
2020–21	HC Oceláři Třinec	ELH	50	0	10	10	56	16	0	3	3	16
2021–22	HC Oceláři Třinec	ELH	48	2	4	6	42	14	2	1	3	10
2022–23	HC Dynamo Pardubice	ELH	48	3	6	9	32	11	1	0	1	6
2023–24	HC Dynamo Pardubice	ELH	42	2	9	11	23	16	0	2	2	4
NHL totals			4	0	2	2	2	—	—	—	—	—
ELH totals			339	10	58	68	278	92	4	10	14	76

=== International ===
Year	Team	Event	Result	GP	G	A	Pts	PIM
2009	Czech Republic	U18	6th	6	0	1	1	6
2011	Czech Republic	U18	8th	5	0	0	0	6
2012	Czech Republic	WJC	5th	5	0	0	0	4
2013	Czech Republic	WJC	5th	6	0	0	0	18
2019	Czech Republic	WC	4th	10	0	1	1	2
2021	Czech Republic	WC	7th	8	0	1	1	0
Junior totals				22	0	1	1	34
Senior totals				18	0	2	2	2

== Awards and honours ==
Award	Year	Ref
ELH
Extraliga champion	2019, 2021, 2022	
International
Spengler Cup All-Star Team	2024	
