= Charles Hudon =

Canadian ice hockey player (born 1994)

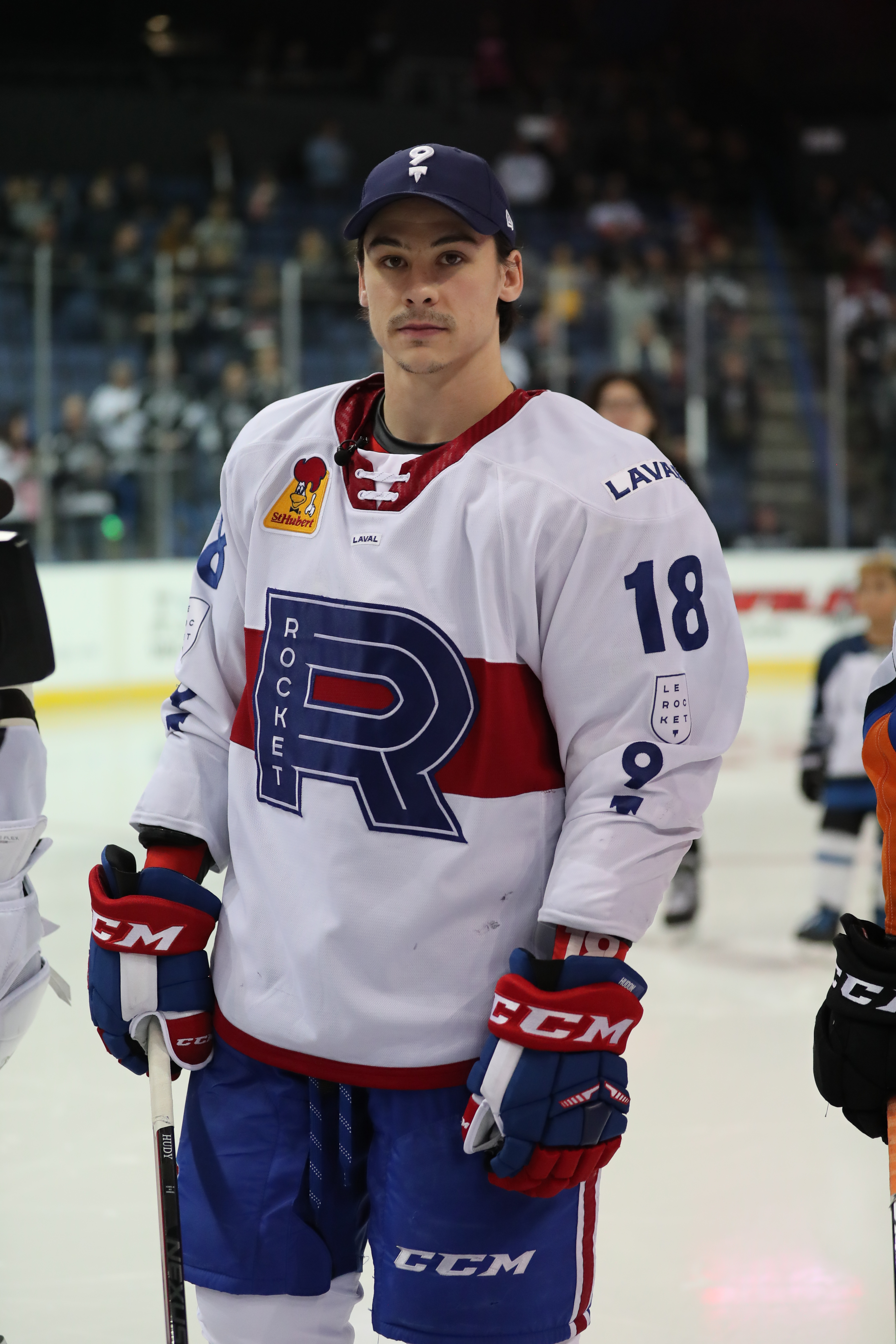
- Hudon with the Laval Rocket in 2020
- Born: June 23, 1994 (age 32) Alma, Quebec, Canada
- Height: 5 ft 10 in (178 cm)
- Weight: 196 lb (89 kg; 14 st 0 lb)
- Position: Left wing
- Shoots: Left
- SHL team Former teams: Djurgårdens IF; Montreal Canadiens; Colorado Avalanche; Lausanne HC
- National team: Canada
- NHL draft: 122nd overall, 2012; Montreal Canadiens
- Playing career: 2013–present

Charles Simard-Hudon (born June 23, 1994) is a Canadian professional ice hockey player who is a left winger for Djurgårdens IF of the Swedish Hockey League (SHL). He was selected in the fifth round, 122nd overall, by the Montreal Canadiens in the 2012 NHL entry draft. Hudon has also previously played for the Colorado Avalanche.

== Playing career ==
=== Junior ===
Hudon played his amateur midget hockey with the Saint-Eustache Vikings of the Quebec Junior AAA Hockey League (QMAAA). He was then drafted to the Quebec Major Junior Hockey League (QMJHL) by the Chicoutimi Saguenéens. Following two prolific seasons in the QMJHL, Hudon was selected in the 2012 NHL entry draft (122nd overall) by the Montreal Canadiens.

On May 5, 2013, Hudon was signed to a three-year entry-level contract by the Canadiens organization. During his final major junior season in 2013–14, he led the offense for the Saguenéens with 41 points in 33 games before being traded to the Baie-Comeau Drakkar. Helping the Drakkar reach the President Cup Finals, Hudon co-lead the team in goals (10) and finishing third in points (21).

=== Professional ===
In his first full professional season in 2014–15, Hudon was assigned to the Hamilton Bulldogs, American Hockey League (AHL) affiliate of the Canadiens, where he quickly assumed a top-line scoring role and recorded a spectacular rookie campaign with 57 points in 75 games. Finishing second amongst team and rookie scoring league-wide, he was honoured as part of the AHL All-Rookie Team. Hudon was also selected to the annual AHL All-Star Game, posting a hat-trick and an assist to earn co-MVP honors.

In the following 2015–16 season, Hudon was initially reassigned to the Canadiens' newfound AHL affiliate, the St. John's IceCaps. On December 8, 2015, he received his first NHL recall by the Montreal Canadiens. He made his NHL debut two days later and recorded his first NHL point with an assist in a 3–2 defeat to the Detroit Red Wings on December 10. He posted another assist in his second game before he was returned to the AHL ranks on December 18.

Agreeing to a two-year extension prior to the 2017–18 season, Hudon recorded his first two career NHL goals in an 8–3 win over the Ottawa Senators on October 30. In his first season of regular NHL action, he generated 30 points (10 goals and 20 assists) on a team that struggled for offensive consistency.

On October 6, 2018, Hudon scored his first goal of the 2018–19 season in a 5–1 victory over the Pittsburgh Penguins. Thereafter, he snapped a nine game goal drought on November 10, scoring the first goal in a 5–4 victory over the Vegas Golden Knights. He ultimately disappointed over the course of his sophomore season with the Canadiens, registering only five points (three goals and two assists) in 32 games. Entering the offseason, Hudon rejected a qualifying offer made by the Canadiens, priming him for restricted free agency.

On July 19, 2019, Hudon signed a one-year, $900,000 contract extension with the Canadiens. He was waived by Montreal before the start of the season, but cleared and was reassigned to the Laval Rocket. After scoring nine goals to start the season with the Rocket, Hudon was recalled by the Canadiens on November 16. He was sent back to Laval on December 7 and earned a spot at the 2020 AHL All-Star Classic.

On October 12, 2020, despite his restricted free agent status with the Canadiens after he was tendered a qualifying offer, it was reported that Hudon would play in Switzerland during 2020–21. Five days later, he agreed to a one-year contract with Lausanne HC of the National League (NL).

As an unrestricted free agent from the Canadiens after seven seasons under contract with the organization, Hudon was signed to a one-year, two-way contract with the Tampa Bay Lightning on July 28, 2021. Following attendance at the Lightning's training camp, he was assigned to join AHL affiliate, the Syracuse Crunch, for the duration of the 2021–22 season. Hudon subsequently matched his career best mark of 57 points, collecting 30 goals and 27 assists through 66 games played.

Leaving the Lightning organization at the conclusion of his contract, Hudon was signed as a free agent to a one-year, two-way contract with the Colorado Avalanche on July 13, 2022.

On July 3, 2023, having left the Avalanche as a free agent, Hudon was signed to a two-year AHL contract with the Ontario Reign, the primary affiliate of the Los Angeles Kings.

After two point-per-game seasons with the Ontario Reign, Hudon left the club as a free agent and returned abroad in agreeing to a two-year contract with Djurgårdens IF of the Swedish Hockey League (SHL) on July 23, 2025.

== Career statistics ==
=== Regular season and playoffs ===
			Regular season					Playoffs
Season	Team	League	GP	G	A	Pts	PIM	GP	G	A	Pts	PIM
2009–10	Saint-Eustache Vikings	QMAAA	40	23	24	47	32	6	4	5	9	4
2010–11	Chicoutimi Saguenéens	QMJHL	63	23	37	60	42	4	0	3	3	4
2011–12	Chicoutimi Saguenéens	QMJHL	59	25	41	66	50	18	6	5	11	16
2012–13	Chicoutimi Saguenéens	QMJHL	56	30	41	71	66	6	5	5	10	8
2012–13	Hamilton Bulldogs	AHL	9	1	2	3	4	—	—	—	—	—
2013–14	Chicoutimi Saguenéens	QMJHL	33	14	27	41	57	—	—	—	—	—
2013–14	Baie-Comeau Drakkar	QMJHL	24	12	23	35	26	22	10	11	21	30
2014–15	Hamilton Bulldogs	AHL	75	19	38	57	68	—	—	—	—	—
2015–16	St. John's IceCaps	AHL	67	28	25	53	79	—	—	—	—	—
2015–16	Montreal Canadiens	NHL	3	0	2	2	0	—	—	—	—	—
2016–17	St. John's IceCaps	AHL	56	27	22	49	52	4	1	3	4	2
2016–17	Montreal Canadiens	NHL	3	0	2	2	2	—	—	—	—	—
2017–18	Montreal Canadiens	NHL	72	10	20	30	38	—	—	—	—	—
2018–19	Montreal Canadiens	NHL	32	3	2	5	16	—	—	—	—	—
2019–20	Laval Rocket	AHL	46	27	8	35	51	—	—	—	—	—
2019–20	Montreal Canadiens	NHL	15	1	1	2	0	2	0	0	0	0
2020–21	Lausanne HC	NL	33	15	17	32	28	6	2	1	3	6
2021–22	Syracuse Crunch	AHL	66	30	27	57	56	5	0	1	1	2
2022–23	Colorado Eagles	AHL	61	29	25	54	40	7	4	0	4	6
2022–23	Colorado Avalanche	NHL	9	0	0	0	2	—	—	—	—	—
2023–24	Ontario Reign	AHL	56	20	34	54	60	8	3	2	5	10
2024–25	Ontario Reign	AHL	67	20	44	64	57	2	0	0	0	0
2025–26	Djurgårdens IF	SHL	40	15	16	31	18	3	0	0	0	0
NHL totals			134	14	27	41	58	2	0	0	0	0

=== International ===
Year	Team	Event	Result	GP	G	A	Pts	PIM
2011	Canada Quebec	U17	4th	6	5	6	11	8
2011	Canada	U18	4th	7	0	1	1	2
2011	Canada	IH18	1st place, gold medalist(s)	5	5	4	9	0
2014	Canada	WJC	4th	7	1	1	2	2
2024	Canada	SC	3rd	3	2	2	4	0
Junior totals				25	11	12	23	12
Senior totals				3	2	2	4	0

== Awards and honours ==
Award	Year	Ref
QMJHL
All-Rookie Team	2011	
Michel Bergeron Trophy	2011	
RDS Cup	2011	
CHL
CHL Canada/Russia Series	2011, 2012, 2013	
CHL/NHL Top Prospects Game	2012	
International
Canada–Russia Challenge	2012	
AHL
All-Rookie Team	2015	
All-Star Game	2015, 2020	
All-Star Game MVP	2015	
