= Eisstadion am Pulverturm =

Indoor arena in Straubing, Germany

Coordinates: 48°52′58″N 12°33′42″E

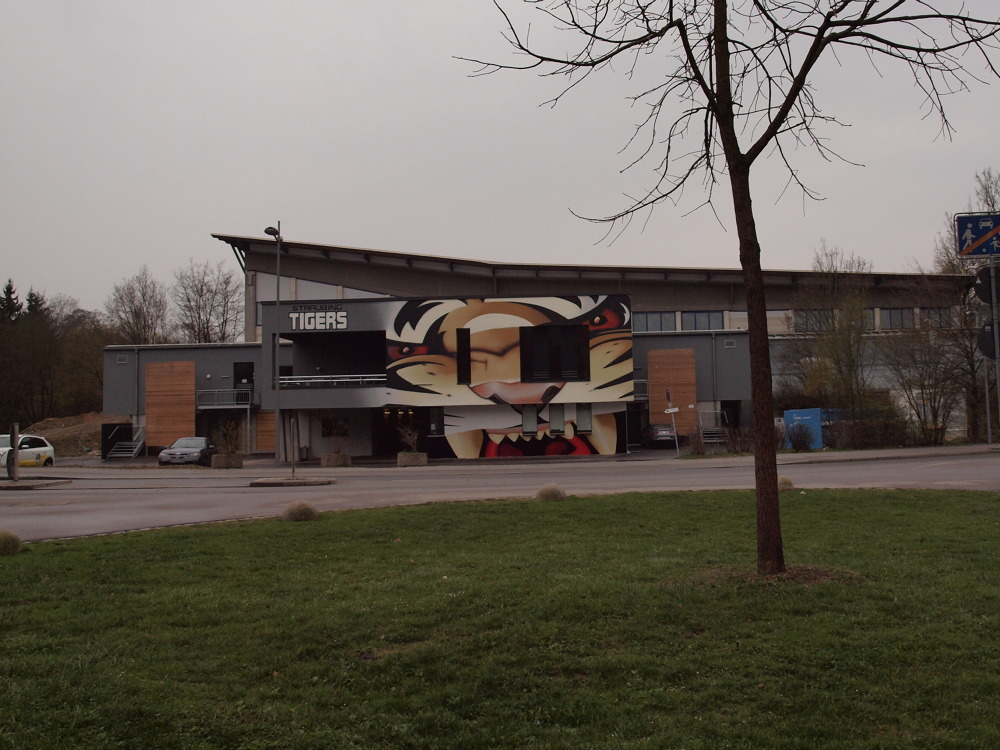
Eisstadion am Pulverturm

Eisstadion am Pulverturm is an arena in Straubing, Germany. It is primarily used for ice hockey and is the home arena of Straubing Tigers. It opened in 1967 and holds 5,730 people. It is one of the smallest arenas in the DEL. Eisstadion am Pulverturm is on Kinseherberg 23 in the city center.
