= Niclas Westerholm =

Finnish ice hockey player (born 1997)

- Born: 13 August 1997 (age 29) Helsinki, Finland
- Height: 6 ft 4 in (193 cm)
- Weight: 198 lb (90 kg; 14 st 2 lb)
- Position: Goaltender
- Catches: Left
- Liiga team Former teams: KooKoo; SaiPa; Oulun Kärpät; BK Mladá Boleslav; HC České Budějovice; Södertälje SK
- National team: Finland
- NHL draft: Undrafted
- Playing career: 2017–present

Niclas Westerholm (born 13 August 1997) is a Finnish professional ice hockey goaltender who is last played with KooKoo in the Liiga.

== Playing career ==
Undrafted, Westerholm played junior hockey in his native Finland with Karhu-Kissat through to the under-20 level. After spending a single season in North America playing high school hockey with Virginia/Mountain Iron-Buhl High in the Minnesota State High School League in the 2015–16 season, Westerholm returned to Finland in signing with top flight club, SaiPa of the Liiga.

He spent the majority of the 2017–18 season with SaiPa's under-20 team in the Jr. A Liiga, where he recorded a 2.42 goals-against average and .926 save percentage in 28 appearances. He made his professional debut in the Mestis with Peliitat, appearing in 3 games to end the season. After the campaign, Westerholm was signed to a three-year, entry-level contract with the Nashville Predators on April 4, 2019. He was immediately added to the Predators roster, in practising as the third string goaltender through their first round playoff defeat.

Westerholm made his Liiga debut in the 2018–19 season with SaiPa, recording a 3.23 goals-against average and .898 save percentage in four games.

After two seasons on loan with SaiPa from the Predators, Westerholm's remaining year of his entry-level deal was terminated after he was placed on unconditional waivers by the Nashville Predators on 15 July 2020. On 31 July 2020, Westerholm signed a one-year contract to continue his tenure with SaiPa.
