= Straubing Tigers =

- City: Straubing, Bavaria
- League: Deutsche Eishockey Liga
- Founded: 1941; 85 years ago
- Home arena: Eisstadion am Pulverturm (capacity: 5,635)
- Colours
- General manager: Jason Dunham
- Head coach: Craig Woodcroft
- Captain: Mike Connolly
- Website: straubing-tigers.de

Franchise history
- Straubing Tigers

The Straubing Tigers are a professional men's ice hockey team, based in Straubing, Germany, that competes in the Deutsche Eishockey Liga. Straubing plays its home games at the Eisstadion am Pulverturm, which has a capacity of 5,635 spectators.

Promoted to the DEL in 2006, and operating with one of the league's smallest budgets, the team could finish no better than twelfth before the 2011–12 DEL season, when it reached the semi-finals of the playoffs. Their greatest success so far is the qualification for the Champions Hockey League seasons 2020–21 (cancelled due to the COVID-19 pandemic), 2022-23 and 2024-25. In 2022-23, Straubing finished first in the CHL group stage and reached the round of 16 against Frölunda HC.

== History ==
=== Bann Straubing (1941–1943) ===
In 1941, the then 14-year-old Max Pielmaier and his friends Max Pellkofer and Harry Poiger founded the first hockey team in Straubing. The first official game took place on the first of February 1942 in Hof, which Straubing lost by a score of 0:1. In the following year there were several games against other Bavarian teams. The game against Landshut on 31 January 1943 was the last game during the Second World War, as the younger players had to join the military after that.

=== TSV 1861 Straubing (1946–1981) ===
After the end of the war the players of Bann Straubing decided to join the TSV 1861 Straubing. Their home games were played on a pond near the medieval Pulverturm (powder tower) in Straubing where the ice stadium Eisstadion am Pulverturm is located today.

The construction of the Eisstadion am Pulverturm began in 1967 and consisted of an open ice rink surrounded by stands. The first game in the new arena was played on the 13. November 1967 against Preussen Berlin. The TSV Straubing started their first season in the Kunsteis-Bayernliga where they finished in second place. The TSV Straubing rose to the Regionalliga (3. league) in 1970 and the Oberliga (2. league) in 1971, but had to go back to the third league when the 2nd Bundesliga, which replaced the Oberliga, was founded with fewer teams than the Oberliga had. They got back to the 2nd Bundesliga in 1975 when they won the playoff finals against EV Regensburg.

=== EHC Straubing (1981–2002) ===
EHC Straubing was founded when the hockey team split from the TSV Straubing in 1981. The ice hockey stadium has belonged to the city of Straubing since the foundation of EHC Straubing. Although EHC finished in 7th place in the 1982/83 season, they had to start again in the 4. league because of financial problems. The EHC Straubing adapted the nickname "Die Tiger" (the tigers) in 1994 and mainly played in the Oberliga (third league) until they rose back to the 2nd Bundesliga in the year 2000. The professional section split from EHC Straubing when it had to declare bankruptcy in April 2002 and the Straubing Tigers AG was founded. Since then EHC trains the junior teams of the Straubing Tigers, and also includes a recreational team.

=== Straubing Tigers (since 2002) ===
After Straubing lost the finals of the 2nd Bundesliga against EV Duisburg in 2005, they won the championship in 2006 and were promoted to the DEL for the first time in history. Straubing is by far the smallest town which has a team in the DEL and also has one of the lowest budgets in the entire league. When the Straubing Tigers reached a playoff rank for the first time in 2012 they miraculously won the quarter-finals against the Grizzly Adams Wolfsburg with a sweep and got to the semi-finals where they lost to the later German champion Eisbären Berlin. With one of the lowest budgets in the entire league Straubing regularly manages to get to the playoffs since 2012 and even qualified for the Champions Hockey League when they finished in the top three in the 2019–20 season. Their first season in the CHL was cancelled due to the COVID-19 pandemic but they qualified again for the season 2022-2023, where they won the group stage and played against Frölunda HC in the round of 16.

== Season records ==
Tigers logo (2004–2021)

Season	Games	Won	OTW	SOW	Lost	OTL	SOL	Points	Goals for	Goals against	Rank	Playoffs
2006–07	52	12	4	4	28	3	1	56	135	189	12	No playoffs
2007–08	56	12	0	4	34	4	2	50	132	197	14	No playoffs
2008–09	52	17	3	4	25	1	2	68	144	164	13	No playoffs
2009–10	56	18	3	2	27	0	6	70	149	193	13	No playoffs
2010–11	52	15	5	4	24	3	1	67	145	159	13	No playoffs
2011–12	52	20	4	4	20	1	3	80	161	151	6	Lost in semi-finals
2012–13	52	21	2	2	23	2	2	74	133	145	9	Lost in first round
2013–14	52	17	2	1	23	3	6	63	136	153	12	No playoffs
2014–15	52	10	1	4	32	2	3	45	103	168	13	No playoffs
2015–16	52	22	1	2	24	2	1	75	147	159	9	Lost in first round
2016–17	52	18	3	0	24	4	3	67	147	168	9	Lost in first round
2017–18	52	17	0	2	27	2	4	61	137	177	13	No playoffs
2018–19	52	21	3	3	19	5	1	81	159	151	8	Lost in wild card
2019–20	52	26	4	4	14	3	1	98	175	136	3	Cancelled due to the COVID-19 pandemic.
2020–21	37	15	2	0	16	1	3	53	103	102	8	Lost in quarterfinals
2021–22	54	29	1	0	17	3	4	96	188	158	4	Lost in quarterfinals
2022–23	56	25	5	4	17	2	3	98	190	166	4	Lost in quarterfinals
2023–24	52	25	5	2	15	1	4	94	167	130	3	Lost in semifinals
2024–25	52	21	3	3	24	0	1	76	159	158	7	Lost in quarterfinals
2025–26	52	32	1	1	17	1	0	101	180	150	3	Lost in quarterfinals

== Players ==
=== Current roster ===
Updated 3 Juin 2026.

No.	Nat	Player	Pos	S/G	Age	Acquired	Birthplace
88	(Canada)	Wade Allison	RW	R	28	2025	Roland, Manitoba, Canada
7	(Canada)	Nicolas Beaudin	D	L	26	2025	Châteauguay, Quebec, Canada
11	(Germany)	Max Bleicher	D	L	19	2026	Füssen, Germany
73	(Germany)	Linus Brandl	C	R	21	2023	Mannheim, Germany
92	(Germany)	Marcel Brandt (A)	D	L	34	2018	Dingolfing, Germany
19	(Germany)	Tim Brunnhuber (A)	C	L	27	2019	Eggenfelden, Germany
1	(Germany)	Florian Bugl	G	L	24	2022	Landshut, Germany
22	(Canada)	Mike Connolly (C)	C	L	36	2015	Calgary, Alberta, Canada
9	(Germany)	Stephan Daschner	D	R	37	2018	Ingolstadt, Germany
79	(United States)	Joseph Duszak	D	R	28	2026	Hempstead, New York, United States
6	(United States)	Alex Green	D	R	28	2024	Chicago, Illinois, United States
71	(United States)	Nick Halloran	RW	R	29	2025	Draper, Utah, United States
40	(Norway)	Henrik Haukeland	G	L	31	2025	Fredrikstad, Norway
93	(Canada)	Spencer Kersten	RW	R	26	2026	Waterloo, Ontario, Canada
17	(Germany)	Adrian Klein	D	L	22	2020	Neustadt an der Waldnaab, Germany
26	(Germany)	Moritz Kukuk	D	R	21	2026	Herdecke, Germany
53	(Germany)	Danjo Leonhardt (A)	F	L	23	2024	Großburgwedel, Germany
8	(Canada)	Zac Leslie	D	L	32	2025	Ottawa, Ontario, Canada
38	(Germany)	Stefan Loibl (A)	RW	L	29	2025	Straubing, Germany
18	(United States)	Tyler Madden	C	R	26	2025	Albany, New York, United States
86	(Canada)	Skyler McKenzie	LW	L	28	2024	Sherwood Park, Alberta, Canada
37	(United States)	Josh Melnick	C	R	30	2025	Annandale, New Jersey, United States
58	(Canada)	Ryan Merkley	D	R	25	2025	Oakville, Ontario, Canada
90	(Germany)	Filip Varejcka	LW	L	25	2025	Munich, Germany
21	(Germany)	Sebastian Wieber	G	R	23	2025	Rosenheim, Germany
13	(Germany)	Mario Zimmermann	D	L	25	2021	Altötting, Germany
