= Deutsche Eishockey Liga =

Premier men's ice hockey league in Germany

DEL
- Current season, competition or edition: 2026–27 DEL season
- Formerly: Eishockey-Bundesliga
- Sport: Ice hockey
- Founded: 1994; 32 years ago
- No. of teams: 14
- Country: Germany
- Most recent champion: Eisbären Berlin (12th title) (2025–26)
- Most titles: Eisbären Berlin (12 titles)
- Broadcasters: Magenta Sport; ServusTV/DF1
- Level on pyramid: Level 1
- Relegation to: DEL2
- International cup: Champions Hockey League
- Related competitions: DEL2 Oberliga
- Website: penny-del.org

The Deutsche Eishockey Liga (for sponsorship reasons called PENNY Deutsche Eishockey Liga) (German pronunciation: [ˌdɔʏtʃə ˈʔaɪshɔki ˌliːɡa]; English: German Ice Hockey League) or DEL, is a professional ice hockey league in Germany and the highest division in German ice hockey. Founded in 1994, it was formed as a replacement for the Eishockey-Bundesliga and became the new top-tier league in Germany as a result. Unlike the old Bundesliga, the DEL is not under the administration of the German Ice Hockey Federation.

Teams from the DEL participate in the IIHF's annual Champions Hockey League (CHL), competing for the European Trophy. Participation is based on the strength of the various leagues in Europe (excluding the European/Asian Kontinental Hockey League). Going into the 2022–23 CHL season, the DEL was ranked the No. 3 league in Europe, allowing them to send their top four teams to compete in the CHL.

In the 2016–17 season, the league was the second-best supported ice hockey league in Europe, behind the Swiss National League A, with an average attendance of 6,198 spectators per game. Fourteen different teams comprise the league, playing their home games in a diverse mix of venues, including a few large, modern arenas (e.g. in Berlin, Mannheim, Cologne, and Düsseldorf) and older, smaller venues (e.g. in Iserlohn, Schwenningen and Straubing). Kölner Haie (English: Cologne Sharks), Düsseldorfer EG, and Eisbären Berlin (Berlin Polar Bears) all regularly attract over 15,000 fans for home games. Adler Mannheim (Mannheim Eagles) also regularly attract over 12,000 fans per home game with each of their home games in the 2019 DEL Playoffs, including all three games in the final series against EHC Red Bull München, selling out. Despite attracting some of the biggest crowds in the DEL, and hosting NHL teams in preseason games, Kölner Haie have not won a championship since 2002.

In the DEL Winter Game, similar to the NHL Winter Classic where matches are played in larger outdoor venues, Cologne and Düsseldorf have played in front of crowds in excess of 40,000, notably in 2019 as Düsseldorf won in overtime in rival Cologne's RheinEnergieStadion. The DEL Winter Game traditionally takes place every two years; four editions have been played since 2013, including games in Cologne and at the home of TSG Hoffenheim, with each attracting over 30,000 spectators. Following a 2021 postponement due to the ongoing COVID-19 pandemic, the DEL Winter Game returned in December 2022 with Cologne hosting Mannheim in the RheinEnergieStadion.

The DEL is known for its game-day atmosphere, as well as producing NHL talents including Dominik Kahun, Tim Stützle and Lukas Reichel. Many of the German national team that took silver at the 2018 Winter Olympics in Pyeongchang played in the DEL, while EHC Red Bull München became the first German team to reach the Champions Hockey League final in 2019, losing to the Swedish team Frölunda HC. EHC Red Bull München followed this up by reaching the semi-finals in the 2021-22 Champions Hockey League. Ice hockey is growing as a sport in Germany and is seen as a popular alternative to football or handball, building upon the Olympic success in 2018.

A new system of promotion and relegation with the DEL2 began with the 2021–22 season, in which the last-placed DEL club will be replaced by the DEL2 champions. SC Bietigheim Steelers joined the DEL for the 2021-22 DEL season as DEL2 champions ahead of the first promotion/relegation to DEL2. Following the conclusion of the 2021–22 season, Bietigheim retained their place in the top flight while Krefeld Pinguine were relegated after finishing bottom of the table. Löwen Frankfurt (Frankfurt Lions) were promoted as DEL2 champions for the 2022–23 season.

The DEL Playoffs decide the season champions using a format akin to that of the NHL. Each team plays 52 regular-season games to determine the regular-season champions before the top 10 teams are seeded and qualify for the playoffs. The top 6 teams receive a bye to the quarter-finals while the teams ranked 7–10 compete in the pre-playoff (wildcard) round. The seedings are re-calculated after each round in a straight knockout system. The DEL Finals, held in late April or early May, is a best-of-7 games format, similar to the NHL where the top seed remaining holds home-ice advantage in a Game 7 scenario.

For the 2021–22 season and 2020–21 season, a shortened version of the DEL playoffs was used in light of the COVID-19 pandemic. Eisbären Berlin won the 2022 Finals against EHC Red Bull München 3-1 in a best-of-5 format. Berlin also won the title in 2021, defeating Wolfsburg 2-1 in a best-of-3 series following a North/South regional league split during the 2020/21 season due to the pandemic.

The Eisbären Berlin and Adler Mannheim are the most successful DEL clubs and have won the last three editions between them (Mannheim 2019, Berlin 2021 & 2022). Mannheim have enjoyed a lot of success in recent years (2015 and 2019 Champions, 2021 Regular Season Champions) although EHC Red Bull München won three consecutive titles between 2016 and 2018 and also made the 2019 final, losing to Mannheim in five games. München were also top of the 2020 standings before the season was curtailed. ERC Ingolstadt (2014 Champions as the 9th seed) and Grizzlys Wolfsburg (2021 runners-up) have also enjoyed deep playoff runs in the last decade.

Some of the league's biggest rivalries include Kölner Haie and Düsseldorfer EG, Kölner Haie and Adler Mannheim, and Eisbären Berlin and EHC Red Bull München. The Bavarian Derbies between München, ERC Ingolstadt, Augsburger Panther, Straubing Tigers, and Nürnberg Ice Tigers are also fiercely contested. Due to geography, Nürnberg/Straubing and Augsburg/Ingolstadt are notable rivalries although Munich/Augsburg has become a stronger rivalry following their epic 2019 semi-final series. München won that series in the deciding game 7 which also included the longest match in DEL history, won by Augsburger Panther after 104 minutes of action in game 3, as two matches required three overtimes to determine a winner.

== History ==
The Eishockey-Bundesliga was formed in 1957 as the elite hockey competition in the Federal Republic of Germany, replacing the Oberliga in this position. It was in turn replaced by the Deutsche Eishockey Liga, which now also carries the name 1st Bundesliga in its logo.

Former DEL logo (1994–1996). The first two seasons were sponsored by Krombacher Brewery

Former DEL logo (1997–2001)

Former DEL logo (2001–2011)

The DEL was founded in the 1994–95 season, consisting of teams from the Eishockey-Bundesliga's 1st and 2nd divisions. The condition of these earlier leagues had become intolerable. Many 1st and 2nd division teams were heavily in debt. The 2nd division attracted few sponsors and spectators. As a result, many clubs were forced to fold or withdraw to the lower leagues. Fans and corporate sponsors focused on the 1st Bundesliga teams, forcing the elite teams to invest heavily in players to avoid relegation. This increased budgets 25 percent over the previous two years.

In the final Bundesliga season, 1993–94, only 11 teams wanted to play in the 2nd Bundesliga. Furthermore, two teams folded during and after the season. Ice hockey's reputation in Germany was heavily tarnished. This made it difficult to attract serious sponsorship. In January 1994, 20 out of the remaining 21 1st and 2nd Bundesliga teams voted for creating a new entity, the DEL.

Upon founding, the "DEL Betriebsgesellschaft mbH" was the first German professional sports league managed by an organization whose members were incorporated as well. The goal behind the DEL was to create a league, based on the model of the North American NHL, in which teams could play consistently without relegation concerns and create a stable league. Clubs in the DEL were required to conform to rules, which were designed to ensure long-term viability. Twelve clubs from the old 1st Bundesliga, and six from the 2nd Bundesliga came together as founding members. The new league immediately attracted corporate sponsorship with the Krombacher Brewery, which was prominently featured on the new league logo.

The hope of avoiding the troubles of the old Bundesliga by stricter financial controls did not materialize. During DEL's initial season, on 18 December 1994, the Bundesliga's final champion, the renamed EC Hedos München, folded. This was controversial, as DEL's president Franz Hofherr had approved their license and certified their finances. Hofherr was Mad Dogs former president and it was alleged that he must have known about their desperate financial situation.

The Bosman ruling, a 1995 decision of the European Court of Justice regarding the movement of labor in soccer, had profound influence on the league. The old Bundesliga had national character with German clubs competing for the German title using mostly German players. After the ruling European Union players were excluded from the "foreign" player quota. In the 1995–96 season following the decision, the DEL teams employed 97 EU players. This lowered costs significantly, enabling smaller teams to compete more effectively. However, frequent player moves were not viewed positively by the fans, resulting in smaller attendance numbers.

Following an agreement with the DEB the league renamed itself as "DEL – Die 1. Bundesliga" in the 1999–2000 season, while reintroducing relegation and promotion to/from the 2nd Ice Hockey Bundesliga.

The 2004–05 season was significant due to the NHL lockout. 26 NHL players came to play the season in the DEL, including Jamie Langenbrunner, Erik Cole, Stéphane Robidas, Doug Weight, Mike York and several German national team players – Jochen Hecht, Olaf Kölzig, and Marco Sturm.

== League regulations ==
The DEL is an independently run league, fully owned and operated by its 14 member teams. Each team must fulfill the DEL's basic requirements to remain in the league:

- A written application for membership;
- "On ice qualification" for new teams (championship in the 2nd Bundesliga);
- A stadium that meets DEL standards;
- Financial qualification;
- Formation of an ordinary company (the DEL consists of franchises);
- Development program for young players; and
- Purchase of a license (currently, the licensing fee is set at €800,000.00)

The DEL can only admit one 2nd Bundesliga team per season to the league, unless the league strength falls below fourteen, in which case two clubs can be admitted. Since the 2006–07 season, no DEL team can be automatically relegated, a team can only lose its league status through non-compliance with the leagues regulations (see above).

The ESBG guarantees to admit any DEL team wishing to step down to the lower 2nd Bundesliga or Oberliga. The team, however, has to purchase a license (licensing fees for the 2nd Bundesliga are currently set at €100,000.00).

To regulate the relationship between the DEL, the DEB and the ESBG (2nd Bundesliga), a so-called Kooperationsvertrag exists. This cooperation contract was signed in December 2005, and was valid until 2011. This contract ended years of dispute between the three organizations over competencies and financial issues.

In November 2007, the DEL announced another change in policy. The league expanded to allow 16 teams beginning in the 2008–09 season, resulting in direct promotion for the 2nd Bundesliga league champions, should they fulfill all requirements and be interested in joining the DEL. Should this not be the case, or a current DEL team resigns from the league, a selection process would determine the club, or clubs, who would be eligible to join in order required to achieve 16 teams. (Note: Füchse Duisburg resigned before the 2009–10 season and was not replaced until the following season.)

For that season, it was also mandated that each DEL club would be allowed to have no more than ten non-EC players under contract.

Additionally, a new format for the game schedule will limit the number of regular-season games to 52 for each team. This is achieved by each team playing four games against eleven others and two games against the remaining four. To determine which teams play, the final standings of the previous season are used.

The DEL would also reintroduce promotion once more. The first- and second-lowest ranked teams will play a best-of-seven series to determine which team faces the 2nd Bundesliga champion for a place in the league. There is, however, an ongoing dispute about those games as second division teams may only have five foreign players on contract and therefore face a handicap in comparison to the DEL teams with twelve import players each. For now, the ESBG has declared that no team from the 2nd Bundesliga would take part in these matches and therefore no promotion/relegation with the DEL will take place.

== Teams ==
Members for the 2025–26 DEL season:

Locations of the Teams of the 2025–26 DEL season

Team	City	State	Arena
Augsburger Panther	Augsburg	Curt Frenzel Stadium	6,218
Eisbären Berlin	Berlin	Uber Arena	14,200
Fischtown Pinguins	Bremerhaven	Eisarena Bremerhaven	4,674
Dresdner Eislöwen	Dresden	Joynext Arena	4,412
Löwen Frankfurt	Frankfurt	Eissporthalle Frankfurt	6,000
ERC Ingolstadt	Ingolstadt	Saturn Arena	4,815
Iserlohn Roosters	Iserlohn	Balver-Zinn Arena	5,000
Kölner Haie	Cologne	Lanxess Arena	18,500
Adler Mannheim	Mannheim	SAP Arena	13,600
EHC Red Bull München	Munich	SAP Garden	11,000
Nürnberg Ice Tigers	Nuremberg	PSD Bank Nürnberg Arena	7,810
Schwenninger Wild Wings	Villingen-Schwenningen	Helios Arena	6,215
Straubing Tigers	Straubing	Eisstadion am Pulverturm	6,000
Grizzlys Wolfsburg	Wolfsburg	Eis Arena Wolfsburg	4,660

=== Former teams ===
- BSC Preussen Berlin
  later BSchC Preussen/Berlin Capitals, dissolved 2005
  refounded as Eissport & Schlittschuh Club 2007 Berlin
- Frankfurt Lions
  dissolved 5 July 2010 due to bankruptcy
- Füchse Duisburg
- ESG Füchse Sachsen Weißwasser/Chemnitz
  now Lausitzer Füchse
- Hamburg Freezers
  ceased operations 24 May 2016
- EC Hannover
  now Hannover Indians
- Hannover Scorpions
- Kassel Huskies
  dissolved 27 August 2010 due to bankruptcy
- Kaufbeurer Adler
- EV Landshut
- Maddogs München
  dissolved 1994 due to bankruptcy
- Moskitos Essen
- Munich Barons
  relocated in 2002 to become Hamburg Freezers
- EC Ratingen "Die Löwen"
  relocated in 1997 to become Revierlöwen Oberhausen
- Revierlöwen Oberhausen
- Star Bulls Rosenheim
- SC Riessersee
- Wölfe Freiburg
- Bietigheim Steelers
- Krefeld Pinguine
- Düsseldorfer EG

== Champions ==
=== Past champions ===
- 1994–95: Kölner Haie
- 1995–96: Düsseldorfer EG
- 1996–97: Adler Mannheim
- 1997–98: Adler Mannheim
- 1998–99: Adler Mannheim
- 1999–00: Munich Barons
- 2000–01: Adler Mannheim
- 2001–02: Kölner Haie
- 2002–03: Krefeld Pinguine
- 2003–04: Frankfurt Lions
- 2004–05: Eisbären Berlin
- 2005–06: Eisbären Berlin
- 2006–07: Adler Mannheim
- 2007–08: Eisbären Berlin
- 2008–09: Eisbären Berlin
- 2009–10: Hannover Scorpions
- 2010–11: Eisbären Berlin
- 2011–12: Eisbären Berlin
- 2012–13: Eisbären Berlin
- 2013–14: ERC Ingolstadt
- 2014–15: Adler Mannheim
- 2015–16: EHC München
- 2016–17: EHC München
- 2017–18: EHC München
- 2018–19: Adler Mannheim
- 2019–20: EHC München (RS) (Note: The 2019–20 season was ended prematurely due to the coronavirus pandemic, which caused the cancellation of the play-offs. The teams are listed by their placement in the regular season.)
- 2020–21: Eisbären Berlin
- 2021–22: Eisbären Berlin
- 2022–23: EHC München
- 2023–24: Eisbären Berlin
- 2024–25: Eisbären Berlin
- 2025–26: Eisbären Berlin

=== Titles by club ===
Club	Titles	Winning years
Eisbären Berlin	12	2004–05, 2005–06, 2007–08, 2008–09, 2010–11, 2011–12, 2012–13, 2020–21, 2021–22, 2023–24, 2024–25, 2025–26
Adler Mannheim	7	1996–97, 1997–98, 1998–99, 2000–01, 2006–07, 2014–15, 2018–19
EHC Red Bull München	4	2015–16, 2016–17, 2017–18, 2022–23
Kölner Haie	2	1994–95, 2001–02
Düsseldorfer EG	1	1995–96
Munich Barons	1	1999–00
Krefeld Pinguine	1	2002–03
Frankfurt Lions	1	2003–04
Hannover Scorpions	1	2009–10
ERC Ingolstadt	1	2013–14

== All-time standings ==
33 clubs have played in the DEL since founding, with 15 currently playing. The 1994 standing represents the Bundesliga and 2. Bundesliga.

Club	No.	94	95 (Note: In the 1994–95 and 1995–96 seasons, 16 clubs qualified for the play-offs.)	96	97	98 (Note: In the 1997–98 season, 14 clubs qualified for the play-offs.)	99	00	01	02	03	04	05	06	07	08	09	10	11	12	13	14	15	16	17	18	19	20	21 (Note: The 2020–21 playoffs were conducted under a reduced format, with no preliminary round and only eight playoff teams.)	22	23	24	25	26
Eisbären Berlin	29	1BL	17	17	4	**1**	2	13	13	7	**1**	**1**	2	**1**	9	2	**1**	**1**	3	**1**	4	8	9	2	8	2	9	4	3	**1**	11	**1**	**1**	**1**
Adler Mannheim	29	1BL	3	6	**1**	4	3	5	**1**	2	4	6	6	10	**1**	6	4	9	7	4	**1**	4	**1**	10	2	5	**1**	2	**1**	5	3	7	4	2
Kölner Haie	29	1BL	6	**1**	2	3	5	**1**	2	6	2	4	4	5	5	3	15	10	9	9	2	5	11	7	4	6	4	11	12	10	6	9	2	3
EHC München (Note: In 2012, EHC München changed their name to EHC Red Bull München.)	12																		8	11	12	7	2	**1**	**1**	**1**	2	**1**	2	2	**1**	4	6	4
Straubing Tigers	16														12	14	13	13	13	6	9	12	13	9	9	13	8	3	8	4	4	3	7	5
ERC Ingolstadt	20										12	7	5	2	4	10	12	7	6	2	6	9	3	8	7	4	5	7	5	7	2	8	3	6
Fischtown Pinguins	6																								10	9	7	6	4	6	8	2	5	7
Schwenninger Wild Wings	19	1BL	9	5	10	9	10	11	12	16	14											13	14	14	12	10	14	14	10	14	12	6	9	8
Grizzlys Wolfsburg	16												13			13	7	3	**1**	3	10	6	7	4	5	7	12	9	6	3	5	4	11	9
Nürnberg Ice Tigers	28	2BL	12	11	15	12	**1**	10	5	4	5	2	3	4	3	**1**	5	5	10	13	7	3	8	6	3	3	10	8	13	8	9	10	8	10
Augsburger Panther	28	2BL	13	12	11	13	8	8	14	8	11	9	7	12	13	12	10	8	14	8	8	11	12	12	6	12	3	10	11	11	14	14	13	11
Iserlohn Roosters (Note: In 2001, the Starbulls Rosenheim sold their DEL licence to the Iserlohn Roosters.)	22								15	12	9	12	11	11	11	5	11	11	12	10	13	10	6	3	13	8	13	13	7	12	13	13	12	12
Löwen Frankfurt	4																														10	12	10	13
Dresdner Eislöwen	1																																	14
Düsseldorfer EG (Note: In 2012, the DEG Metro Stars changed their name to Düsseldorfer EG.)	26	1BL	5	3	9	5			11	9	3	8	10	3	2	9	3	6	2	7	14	14	5	5	11	11	6	5	9	9	7	11	14	
Bietigheim Steelers	1																													13	15			
Krefeld Pinguine	28	1BL	4	7	8	11	7	3	9	3	6	10	9	8	10	11	6	12	4	12	3	2	10	13	14	14	11	12	14	15				
Hamburg Freezers (Note: In 2002, the Munich Barons relocated to become the Hamburg Freezers.)	14										8	3	8	6	7	7	8	14	11	5	5	**1**	4	11										
Frankfurt Lions	16	2BL	10	8	12	2	4	7	10	11	13	5	**1**	9	8	4	9	2																
Hannover Scorpions	17				14	7	11	9	7	10	10	13	12	7	6	8	2	4	5	14	11													
Kassel Huskies	14	2BL	7	9	3	10	9	4	4	5	7	11	14	13			14	15																
EV Duisburg	4													14	14	15	16																	
Wölfe Freiburg	1											14																						
Revierlöwen Oberhausen	5					14	14	14	6	13																								
Moskitos Essen	3							15	16	14																								
Preussen Berlin	8	1BL	**1**	2	5	8	13	6	8	15																								
Munich Barons (Note: In 1999, the Landshut Cannibals sold their DEL licence to the Munich Barons.)	3							2	3	**1**																								
Star Bulls Rosenheim	6	1BL	8	13	6	15	12	12																										
Landshut Cannibals	5	1BL	2	4	7	6	6																											
Ratinger Löwen	3	1BL	16	10	16																													
ESV Kaufbeuren	3	1BL	11	15	13																													
SC Riessersee	1			14																														
Hannover Indians	2	2BL	14	16																														
Lausitzer Füchse	2	2BL	15	18																														
Maddogs München (Note: In 1995, the Maddogs München folded during the regular season.)	1	1BL	18																															

Color code	Result
Gold	Play-off champion
Silver	Play-off finalist
Green	Semi-finalist
Blue	1st round
Purple	Preliminary round
White	Did not qualify for play-offs
Red	Relegated to DEL2 or folded mid-season
**Bold**	Regular season champion
Italics	Play-offs not conducted
No.	Number of seasons in league (as of 2020–21)

== See also ==
- List of German ice hockey champions
- DEL2
- Oberliga
