= 2023–24 DEL season =

- League: Deutsche Eishockey Liga
- Sport: Ice hockey
- Duration: 14 September 2023 – 30 April 2024

Regular season
- Season champions: Fischtown Pinguins
- Season MVP: Nicolas Mattinen
- Top scorer: Jan Urbas (51 points)

Finals
- Champions: Eisbären Berlin
- Runners-up: Fischtown Pinguins
- Finals MVP: Leonhard Pföderl

DEL seasons
- ← 2022–23 2024–25 →

The 2023–24 Deutsche Eishockey Liga season was the 30th season since the founding of the Deutsche Eishockey Liga. It started on 14 September 2023 and ended on 26 April 2024.

EHC Red Bull München were the defending champions. Eisbären Berlin won their tenth title after a finals win in five games over the Fischtown Pinguins.

== Format ==
The teams played a quadruple round-robin for 52 games each, playing every other team four times. After the regular season, places one to six were qualified for the playoffs, while place seven to ten played in the pre-playoffs. The playoffs were played in a best of seven mode. The last team from the regular season was relegated to DEL2.

== Teams ==
Locations of the Teams of the 2023–24 DEL season

Team	City	Arena	Capacity
Augsburger Panther	Augsburg	Curt Frenzel Stadium	6,218
Eisbären Berlin	Berlin	Mercedes-Benz Arena	14,200
Fischtown Pinguins	Bremerhaven	Eisarena Bremerhaven	4,674
Düsseldorfer EG	Düsseldorf	PSD Bank Dome	13,400
Löwen Frankfurt	Frankfurt	Eissporthalle Frankfurt	6,000
ERC Ingolstadt	Ingolstadt	Saturn Arena	4,815
Iserlohn Roosters	Iserlohn	Eissporthalle Iserlohn	5,000
Kölner Haie	Cologne	Lanxess Arena	18,500
Adler Mannheim	Mannheim	SAP Arena	13,600
EHC Red Bull München	Munich	Olympia Eishalle	6,256
Nürnberg Ice Tigers	Nuremberg	Arena Nürnberger Versicherung	7,810
Schwenninger Wild Wings	Villingen-Schwenningen	Helios Arena	6,215
Straubing Tigers	Straubing	Eisstadion am Pulverturm	6,000
Grizzlys Wolfsburg	Wolfsburg	Eis Arena Wolfsburg	4,660

== Regular season ==
=== Standings ===
Pos	Team	Pld	W	OTW	OTL	L	GF	GA	GD	Pts	Qualification or relegation
1	Fischtown Pinguins	52	29	7	6	10	162	116	+46	107	Playoffs
2	Eisbären Berlin	52	29	6	3	14	181	134	+47	102	Playoffs
3	Straubing Tigers	52	25	7	5	15	167	130	+37	94	Playoffs
4	Grizzlys Wolfsburg	52	26	2	5	19	152	145	+7	87	Playoffs
5	EHC Red Bull München	52	26	2	4	20	156	134	+22	86	Playoffs
6	Schwenninger Wild Wings	52	24	5	3	20	159	145	+14	85	Playoffs
7	Adler Mannheim	52	21	6	5	20	147	149	−2	80	Pre-playoffs
8	Kölner Haie	52	20	6	6	20	155	158	−3	78	Pre-playoffs
9	ERC Ingolstadt	52	17	7	8	20	132	138	−6	73	Pre-playoffs
10	Nürnberg Ice Tigers	52	18	3	10	21	148	175	−27	70	Pre-playoffs
11	Düsseldorfer EG	52	14	7	6	25	135	156	−21	62	
12	Löwen Frankfurt	52	15	5	3	29	144	161	−17	58	
13	Iserlohn Roosters	52	13	6	6	27	125	183	−58	57	
14	Augsburger Panther (Note: Although originally relegated, Augsburg will stay in the DEL as the winning team from the DEL2 (Eisbären Regensburg) did not apply for a place.)	52	12	6	5	29	138	177	−39	53	

Source: DEL
Rules for classification: 1) points; 2) head-to-head points; 3) head-to-head goal difference; 4) head-to-head number of goals scored.

=== Results ===
Home \ Away	AUG	BER	BRE	DÜS	FRA	ING	ISE	KÖL	MAN	MUN	NÜR	SCH	STR	WOL	AUG	BER	BRE	DÜS	FRA	ING	ISE	KÖL	MAN	MUN	NÜR	SCH	STR	WOL
Augsburger Panther	—	1–4	1–4	2–4	2–3	1–4	2–1 (Note: Overtime)	4–1	2–3 (Note: Shootout)	7–2	5–3	5–2	1–7	1–2	—	2–3	1–3	1–3	5–2	2–3	1–2	1–5	2–6	4–3	6–2	3–2	1–4	1–3
Eisbären Berlin	6–5	—	2–4	1–4	3–1	2–1	0–3	0–1	1–3	6–2	5–0	5–3	3–4	6–9	6–3	—	1–2	4–2	4–3	2–3	6–4	5–4	3–2	2–1	3–2	2–3	3–2	2–1
Fischtown Pinguins	3–2	3–4	—	4–2	0–4	3–2	1–2	5–2	2–4	2–5	3–1	6–0	2–0	6–2	4–0	5–1	—	5–4	2–1	2–1	5–1	1–2	4–3	2–1	5–2	4–1	5–3	6–5
Düsseldorfer EG	0–1	2–3	3–4	—	3–7	2–3	2–1	7–1	4–1	3–1	1–2	5–4	1–4	2–5	4–5	1–3	6–5	—	2–1	0–2	1–0	2–3	3–2	1–3	6–5	6–3	5–3	1–2
Löwen Frankfurt	2–4	2–5	4–2	4–2	—	2–4	2–3	6–4	4–5	2–4	6–2	5–3	3–2	2–3	4–3	2–5	2–3	1–3	—	3–2	0–3	6–3	5–3	4–5	1–4	3–4	3–2	4–5
ERC Ingolstadt	6–3	1–4	2–3	3–2	2–3	—	7–1	5–4	2–3	2–0	3–5	7–2	1–2	2–5	1–4	0–4	3–2	4–3	1–4	—	0–2	3–5	4–0	2–1	5–4	3–5	1–0	5–1
Iserlohn Roosters	2–6	2–8	1–5	1–2	5–2	2–3	—	3–6	7–4	2–5	5–4	2–7	4–3	4–2	5–2	3–5	2–4	2–4	4–0	2–3	—	2–5	2–5	1–3	1–4	3–5	4–3	3–1
Kölner Haie	4–3	2–5	2–3	3–4	4–3	4–1	3–4	—	3–4	1–5	5–1	3–1	2–3	1–5	3–2	2–3	3–2	3–1	3–2	2–3	4–5	—	1–6	3–6	4–2	5–1	3–0	2–3
Adler Mannheim	5–4	4–2	1–3	3–2	3–2	2–1	4–2	0–4	—	4–3	6–2	3–5	0–1	4–1	3–4	1–3	1–2	2–3	3–2	1–3	4–2	1–0	—	3–2	3–2	1–4	1–5	6–4
EHC Red Bull München	5–1	4–6	2–1	4–2	5–2	3–5	4–0	2–5	5–1	—	5–3	3–0	2–4	0–1	4–5	3–6	4–2	2–1	2–1	2–1	3–2	3–2	6–1	—	5–3	7–3	6–4	2–1
Nürnberg Ice Tigers	5–2	2–10	3–0	4–1	2–3	0–2	8–2	1–4	5–2	2–1	—	1–4	5–3	3–2	1–2	1–4	4–2	5–3	1–3	2–3	3–0	4–3	4–3	2–1	—	3–2	3–4	4–5
Schwenninger Wild Wings	2–1	4–1	1–2	5–2	6–3	6–3	3–1	2–3	2–1	3–1	3–4	—	4–3	5–0	5–2	3–0	1–2	3–0	2–3	4–2	5–1	4–1	3–1	3–2	2–1	—	3–2	2–3
Straubing Tigers	4–1	6–2	4–3	2–1	2–0	3–1	3–2	3–4	3–5	4–2	7–4	4–1	—	0–2	4–1	4–1	4–3	4–1	2–1	4–2	2–4	3–1	3–6	2–1	4–3	6–3	—	6–3
Grizzlys Wolfsburg	4–3	0–5	1–3	9–4	3–2	4–1	2–3	4–5	2–1	2–3	3–1	3–4	2–1	—	5–4	2–1	2–3	1–2	2–4	3–1	7–0	5–0	0–3	2–0	2–4	2–1	4–6	—

Source: DEL
Legend: Blue = home team win; Yellow = draw; Red = away team win.

== Playoffs ==
The playoffs started on 10 March and ended on 26 April 2024. The first round was played in a best-of-three mode, afterwards it will be best-of-seven.

=== Bracket ===
First round
7	Adler Mannheim	2
10	Nürnberg Ice Tigers	0
8	Kölner Haie	1
9	ERC Ingolstadt	2

Quarterfinals
1	Fischtown Pinguins	4
9	ERC Ingolstadt	0
2	Eisbären Berlin	4
7	Adler Mannheim	1
3	Straubing Tigers	4
6	Schwenninger Wild Wings	3
4	Grizzlys Wolfsburg	0
5	EHC Red Bull München	4

Semifinals
1	Fischtown Pinguins	4
5	EHC Red Bull München	1
(Pairings are re-seeded after the first and second round)
2	Eisbären Berlin	4
3	Straubing Tigers	1

Finals
1	Fischtown Pinguins	1
2	Eisbären Berlin	4

=== Pre-playoffs ===
The pre-playoffs were played between 10 and 14 March 2024 in a best-of-three mode.

==== Adler Mannheim vs Nürnberg Ice Tigers ====
10 March 2024	Adler Mannheim	2–1	Nürnberg Ice Tigers	SAP Arena	Recap
David Wolf (PP) – 12:24		First period	No scoring
No scoring		Second period	No scoring
Daniel Fischbuch – 50:00		Third period	59:07 – Tim Fleischer (PP, EA)
Arno Tiefensee (13 saves / 14 shots)		Goalie stats	Niklas Treutle (30 saves / 32 shots)

12 March 2024	Nürnberg Ice Tigers	3–6	Adler Mannheim	Arena Nürnberger Versicherung	Recap
Evan Barratt – 00:29		First period	18:22 – Leon Gawanke
No scoring		Second period	29:04 – Ryan MacInnis (PP); 37:32 – Tyler Gaudet
Constantin Braun – 47:51; Danjo Leonhardt (PP) – 56:52		Third period	48:18 – Jordan Szwarz; 58:38 – David Wolf (EN); 59:56 – Daniel Fischbuch (EN)
Niklas Treutle (30 saves / 34 shots)		Goalie stats	Arno Tiefensee (30 saves / 33 shots)

Mannheim won series 2–0

==== Kölner Haie vs ERC Ingolstadt ====
10 March 2024	ERC Ingolstadt	1–5	Kölner Haie	Saturn Arena	Recap
No scoring		First period	04:51 – Justin Schütz; 19:43 – Justin Schütz
Patrik Virta – 37:25		Second period	20:49 – Alexandre Grenier; 28:55 – Justin Schütz; 33:32 – Gregor MacLeod (PP)
No scoring		Third period	No scoring
Michael Garteig (15 saves / 20 shots)		Goalie stats	Tobias Ančička (29 saves / 30 shots)

13 March 2024	Kölner Haie	2–3	ERC Ingolstadt	Lanxess Arena	Recap
David McIntyre – 07:15		First period	00:32 – Maury Edwards; 10:43 – Casey Bailey (PP)
Frederik Storm – 38:19		Second period	35:22 – Charles Bertrand
No scoring		Third period	No scoring
Tobias Ančička (21 saves / 24 shots)		Goalie stats	Michael Garteig (39 saves / 41 shots)

14 March 2024	Kölner Haie	2–4	ERC Ingolstadt	Lanxess Arena	Recap
No scoring		First period	02:06 – Jan Nijenhuis
Brady Austin – 30:00		Second period	31:20 – Philipp Krauß; 35:29 – Casey Bailey
Gregor MacLeod (PP) – 41:44		Third period	59:23 – Brandon Kozun (PP, EN)
Tobias Ančička (19 saves / 23 shots)		Goalie stats	Michael Garteig (30 saves / 32 shots)

Ingolstadt won series 2–1

=== Quarterfinals ===
The quarterfinals were played between 16 and 30 March 2024 in a best-of-seven mode.

==== Fischtown Pinguins vs ERC Ingolstadt ====
17 March 2024	Fischtown Pinguins	6–4	ERC Ingolstadt	Eisarena Bremerhaven	Recap
Ross Mauermann – 02:14; Skyler McKenzie – 18:48		First period	No scoring
Colt Conrad – 22:02; Ross Mauermann – 25:31		Second period	32:45 – Travis St. Denis (PP2); 33:49 – Maurice Edwards (PP)
Christian Wejse (PP) – 52:43; Markus Vikingstad (EN) – 59:59		Third period	46:38 – Charles Bertrand; 58:37 – Wayne Simpson (EA)
Kristers Gudļevskis (18 saves / 22 shots)		Goalie stats	Michael Garteig (12 saves / 16 shots)

20 March 2024	ERC Ingolstadt	3–4	OT	Fischtown Pinguins	Saturn Arena	Recap
Mat Bodie – 06:34		First period		No scoring
Philipp Krauß – 22:14; Maurice Edwards – 29:26		Second period		28:27 – Miha Verlič
No scoring		Third period		40:51 – Jan Urbas; 42:27 – Christian Wejse
No scoring		First overtime period		64:17 – Colt Conrad
Michael Garteig (32 saves / 36 shots)		Goalie stats		Kristers Gudļevskis (15 saves / 18 shots)

22 March 2024	Fischtown Pinguins	4–3	OT	ERC Ingolstadt	Eisarena Bremerhaven	Recap
No scoring		First period		16:34 – Mirko Höfflin
Alex Friesen (PP2) – 21:03; Miha Verlič – 28:32		Second period		39:17 – Charles Bertrand
Ross Mauermann – 53:39		Third period		43:09 – Wojciech Stachowiak
Jan Urbas – 64:28		First overtime period		No scoring
Kristers Gudļevskis (23 saves / 26 shots)		Goalie stats		Michael Garteig (33 saves / 37 shots)

24 March 2024	ERC Ingolstadt	1–3	Fischtown Pinguins	Saturn Arena	Recap
No scoring		First period	05:00 – Markus Vikingstad
No scoring		Second period	No scoring
Wojciech Stachowiak (PP, EA) – 56:16		Third period	41:37 – Ross Mauermann; 45:54 – Dominik Uher (PP)
Michael Garteig (14 saves / 17 shots)		Goalie stats	Kristers Gudļevskis (26 saves / 27 shots)

Bremerhaven won series 4–0

==== Eisbären Berlin vs Adler Mannheim ====
17 March 2024	Eisbären Berlin	1–7	Adler Mannheim	Mercedes-Benz Arena	Recap
No scoring		First period	03:44 – Tom Kühnhackl; 06:32 – Stefan Loibl
No scoring		Second period	35:54 – Kris Bennett (EA); 36:20 – Keaton Thompson
Ty Ronning – 43:54		Third period	42:26 – Stefan Loibl; 50:08 – Ryan MacInnis (PP); 59:20 – Denis Reul
Jake Hildebrand (24 saves / 28 shots)		Goalie stats	Arno Tiefensee (28 saves / 29 shots)

20 March 2024	Adler Mannheim	2–4	Eisbären Berlin	SAP Arena	Recap
Stefan Loibl – 01:15; David Wolf – 04:20		First period	No scoring
No scoring		Second period	27:16 – Ty Ronning; 28:13 – Marcel Noebels; 28:58 – Lean Bergmann
No scoring		Third period	58:10 – Tobias Eder
Arno Tiefensee (23 saves / 27 shots)		Goalie stats	Jake Hildebrand (34 saves / 36 shots)

22 March 2024	Eisbären Berlin	3–2	Adler Mannheim	Mercedes-Benz Arena	Recap
Yannick Veilleux – 08:57; Kai Wissmann (PP) – 13:49		First period	No scoring
Blaine Byron (PP) – 27:42		Second period	No scoring
No scoring		Third period	42:52 – Leon Gawanke (PP); 53:25 – Ryan MacInnis (PP)
Jake Hildebrand (35 saves / 37 shots)		Goalie stats	Arno Tiefensee (27 saves / 30 shots)

24 March 2024	Adler Mannheim	1–3	Eisbären Berlin	SAP Arena	Recap
No scoring		First period	16:20 – Marcel Noebels
No scoring		Second period	No scoring
Jordan Szwarz – 51:21		Third period	57:49 – Tobias Eder (PP); 58:33 – Manuel Wiederer (EN)
Arno Tiefensee (27 saves / 30 shots)		Goalie stats	Jake Hildebrand (35 saves / 36 shots)

26 March 2024	Eisbären Berlin	3–2	Adler Mannheim	Mercedes-Benz Arena	Recap
Julian Melchiori – 00:59		First period	17:12 – Matthias Plachta
Zach Boychuk (PP2) – 30:18		Second period	No scoring
Zach Boychuk – 57:33		Third period	54:25 – John Gilmour (PP)
Jake Hildebrand (23 saves / 25 shots)		Goalie stats	Arno Tiefensee (14 saves / 17 shots)

Berlin won series 4–1

==== Straubing Tigers vs Schwenninger Wild Wings ====
16 March 2024	Straubing Tigers	5–2	Schwenninger Wild Wings	Eisstadion am Pulverturm	Recap
No scoring		First period	No scoring
JC Lipon – 26:57; Nicolas Mattinen (PP) – 29:28; JC Lipon – 30:19		Second period	34:07 – Chris Brown
Justin Braun – 52:04; Mark Zengerle (EN) – 58:44		Third period	43:10 – Alexander Karachun
Florian Bugl (23 saves / 25 shots)		Goalie stats	Joacim Eriksson (24 saves / 29 shots)

19 March 2024	Schwenninger Wild Wings	5–1	Straubing Tigers	Helios Arena	Recap
Johannes Huß – 00:16; Tylor Spink – 01:17; Phil Hungerecker – 10:34		First period	No scoring
Tyson Spink – 31:58		Second period	23:14 – Mike Connolly
Chris Brown (PP) – 46:07		Third period	No scoring
Joacim Eriksson (30 saves / 31 shots)		Goalie stats	Florian Bugl (22 saves / 27 shots)

22 March 2024	Straubing Tigers	3–4	OT	Schwenninger Wild Wings	Eisstadion am Pulverturm	Recap
No scoring		First period		00:59 – Phil Hungerecker (SH); 09:09 – Alexander Karachun (PP); 19:54 – Daniel Pfaffengut (PP)
JC Lipon – 31:14; Tim Brunnhuber – 35:13		Second period		No scoring
Marcel Brandt (PP2) – 49:45		Third period		No scoring
No scoring		First overtime period		76:26 – Tyson Spink (EA)
Florian Bugl (6 saves / 9 shots)		Goalie stats		Joacim Eriksson (46 saves / 49 shots)

24 March 2024	Schwenninger Wild Wings	1–5	Straubing Tigers	Helios Arena	Recap
No scoring		First period	07:00 – Tyler Sheehy; 16:08 – JC Lipon
Phil Hungerecker – 30:35		Second period	24:14 – Marcel Brandt; 28:18 – Michael Clarke; 36:36 – Matt Bradley (PP)
No scoring		Third period	No scoring
Joacim Eriksson (12 saves / 17 shots)		Goalie stats	Hunter Miska (25 saves / 26 shots)

26 March 2024	Straubing Tigers	3–2	Schwenninger Wild Wings	Eisstadion am Pulverturm	Recap
Sandro Schönberger – 18:20		First period	No scoring
JC Lipon – 20:17; Cole Fonstad – 30:48		Second period	No scoring
No scoring		Third period	54:31 – Zachary Senyshyn; 58:18 – Alexander Karachun (EA)
Hunter Miska (18 saves / 20 shots)		Goalie stats	Joacim Eriksson (21 saves / 24 shots)

28 March 2024	Schwenninger Wild Wings	4–0	Straubing Tigers	Helios Arena	Recap
Tylor Spink – 06:49		First period	No scoring
Phil Hungerecker (SH) – 21:10; Kyle Platzer – 38:53		Second period	No scoring
Kyle Platzer – 53:47		Third period	No scoring
Joacim Eriksson (33 saves / 33 shots)		Goalie stats	Hunter Miska (14 saves / 17 shots)

30 March 2024	Straubing Tigers	3–2	Schwenninger Wild Wings	Eisstadion am Pulverturm	Recap
Stephan Daschner – 13:59; Cole Fonstad – 17:45		First period	No scoring
JC Lipon (PP, EA) – 23:17		Second period	Thomas Larkin – 53:29
No scoring		Third period	Tyson Spink – 56:28
Hunter Miska (21 saves / 23 shots)		Goalie stats	Joacim Eriksson (15 saves / 18 shots)

Straubing won series 4–3

==== Grizzlys Wolfsburg vs EHC Red Bull München ====
16 March 2024	Grizzlys Wolfsburg	3–6	EHC Red Bull München	Eis Arena Wolfsburg	Recap
No scoring		First period	08:44 – Patrick Hager; 11:24 – Chris DeSousa
Chris Wilkie – 26:32; Luis Schinko – 29:03		Second period	29:24 – Chris DeSousa; 30:03 – Nico Krämmer; 36:40 – Trevor Parkes
Ryan O'Connor – 50:52		Third period	59:39 – Konrad Abeltshauser
Dustin Strahlmeier (30 saves / 36 shots)		Goalie stats	Mathias Niederberger (25 saves / 28 shots)

19 March 2024	EHC Red Bull München	7–3	Grizzlys Wolfsburg	Olympia Eishalle	Recap
Patrick Hager – 09:47		First period	No scoring
Nico Krämmer – 24:45; Maximilian Kastner (PP) – 37:48; Trevor Parkes – 38:36		Second period	20:36 – Ryan O'Connor (PP); 23:52 – Matt White (PP); 28:56 – Gerrit Fauser
Chris DeSousa (PP) – 47:19; Trevor Parkes – 47:45; Nico Krämmer (EN) – 54:28		Third period	No scoring
Mathias Niederberger (17 saves / 20 shots)		Goalie stats	Dustin Strahlmeier (32 saves / 39 shots)

22 March 2024	Grizzlys Wolfsburg	3–4	EHC Red Bull München	Eis Arena Wolfsburg	Recap
Matt White – 02:54		First period	No scoring
No scoring		Second period	23:10 – Gerrit Fauser; 27:25 – Patrick Hager; 37:40 – Patrick Hager (PP)
Justin Feser – 45:25; Darren Archibald (EA) – 59:43		Third period	47:48 – Ben Street
Hannibal Weitzmann (36 saves / 40 shots)		Goalie stats	Mathias Niederberger (28 saves / 31 shots)

24 March 2024	EHC Red Bull München	2–1	Grizzlys Wolfsburg	Olympia Eishalle	Recap
No scoring		First period	No scoring
Veit Oswald (EA) – 39:26		Second period	36:27 – Gerrit Fauser (SH)
Filip Varejcka – 45:13		Third period	No scoring
Mathias Niederberger (25 saves / 26 shots)		Goalie stats	Hannibal Weitzmann (25 saves / 27 shots)

Munich won series 4–0

=== Semifinals ===
The quarterfinals were played between 1 and 10 April 2024 in a best-of-seven mode.

==== Fischtown Pinguins vs EHC Red Bull München ====
1 April 2024	Fischtown Pinguins	3–0	EHC Red Bull München	Eisarena Bremerhaven	Recap
Jan Urbas (PP) – 05:06		First period	No scoring
Markus Vikingstad – 21:58; Dominik Uher – 27:15		Second period	No scoring
No scoring		Third period	No scoring
Kristers Gudļevskis (30 saves / 30 shots)		Goalie stats	Mathias Niederberger (22 saves / 25 shots)

3 April 2024	EHC Red Bull München	2–3	OT	Fischtown Pinguins	Olympia Eishalle	Recap
No scoring		First period		13:47 – Markus Vikingstad
Markus Eisenschmid – 33:04; Maximilian Daubner – 36:23		Second period		25:01 – Miha Verlič (PP)
No scoring		Third period		No scoring
No scoring		First overtime period		73:09 – Phillip Bruggisser (EA)
Mathias Niederberger (29 saves / 31 shots)		Goalie stats		Kristers Gudļevskis (29 saves / 31 shots)

5 April 2024	Fischtown Pinguins	0–4	EHC Red Bull München	Eisarena Bremerhaven	Recap
No scoring		First period	06:27 – Konrad Abeltshauser
No scoring		Second period	24:05 – Trevor Parkes
No scoring		Third period	52:58 – Maximilian Kastner (PP); 57:54 – Chris DeSousa (EA)
Kristers Gudļevskis (24 saves / 28 shots)		Goalie stats	Mathias Niederberger (19 saves / 19 shots)

7 April 2024	EHC Red Bull München	2–3	Fischtown Pinguins	Olympia Eishalle	Recap
Jonathon Blum – 09:43		First period	01:19 – Ross Mauermann; 04:29 – Christian Wejse (PP); 05:35 – Jan Urbas (PP)
Chris DeSousa – 27:24		Second period	No scoring
No scoring		Third period	No scoring
Mathias Niederberger (18 saves / 21 shots)		Goalie stats	Kristers Gudļevskis (22 saves / 24 shots)

9 April 2024	Fischtown Pinguins	3–0	EHC Red Bull München	Eisarena Bremerhaven	Recap
No scoring		First period	No scoring
Jan Urbas – 31:35		Second period	No scoring
Phillip Bruggisser (PP2) – 50:16; Phillip Bruggisser (SH) – 58:16		Third period	No scoring
Kristers Gudļevskis (32 saves / 32 shots)		Goalie stats	Mathias Niederberger (28 saves / 31 shots)

Bremerhaven won series 4–1

==== Eisbären Berlin vs Straubing Tigers ====
1 April 2024	Eisbären Berlin	3–1	Straubing Tigers	Uber Arena	Recap
Kai Wissmann – 11:04		First period	No scoring
Manuel Wiederer – 23:20; Blaine Byron – 28:03		Second period	No scoring
No scoring		Third period	58:00 – Tyler Sheehy (PP, EA)
Jake Hildebrand (28 saves / 29 shots)		Goalie stats	Hunter Miska (17 saves / 20 shots)

3 April 2024	Straubing Tigers	3–4	3OT	Eisbären Berlin	Eisstadion am Pulverturm	Recap
Philip Samuelsson – 14:52		First period		No scoring
No scoring		Second period		37:16 – Jonas Müller; 39:08 – Leonhard Pföderl (PP)
Joshua Samanski – 49:00; Cole Fonstad – 55:54		Third period		43:13 – Blaine Byron
No scoring		Third overtime period		110:40 – Lean Bergmann (EA)
Florian Bugl (42 saves / 45 shots)		Goalie stats		Jake Hildebrand (61 saves / 64 shots)

5 April 2024	Eisbären Berlin	3–2	Straubing Tigers	Uber Arena	Recap
Ty Ronning (PP) – 09:02; Yannick Veilleux – 16:52		First period	17:20 – Cole Fonstad
Marcel Noebels (PP) – 21:47		Second period	33:04 – Adrian Klein
No scoring		Third period	No scoring
Jake Hildebrand (26 saves / 28 shots)		Goalie stats	Florian Bugl (15 saves / 18 shots)

7 April 2024	Straubing Tigers	3–2	Eisbären Berlin	Eisstadion am Pulverturm	Recap
Cole Fonstad – 09:18		First period	No scoring
No scoring		Second period	29:45 – Frederik Tiffels
Mark Zengerle – 42:26; Joshua Samanski – 49:34		Third period	53:28 – Blaine Byron (PP)
Hunter Miska (31 saves / 33 shots)		Goalie stats	Jake Hildebrand (22 saves / 25 shots)

10 April 2024	Eisbären Berlin	3–2	OT	Straubing Tigers	Uber Arena	Recap
No scoring		First period		No scoring
Marcel Noebels (PP) – 23:42		Second period		30:17 – Philip Samuelsson
Tobias Eder – 41:29		Third period		40:49 – Justin Scott
Ty Ronning – 67:00		First overtime period		No scoring
Jake Hildebrand (28 saves / 30 shots)		Goalie stats		Hunter Miska (26 saves / 29 shots)

Berlin won series 4–1

=== Final ===
The finals were played between 17 and 26 April 2024 in a best-of-seven mode.

17 April 2023	Fischtown Pinguins	4–2	Eisbären Berlin	Eisarena Bremerhaven	Recap
Lukas Kälble – 11:07; Ross Mauermann – 12:40		First period	00:43 – Zach Boychuk; 05:33 – Leonhard Pföderl
Miha Verlič – 29:40; Alexander Friesen – 35:40		Second period	No scoring
No scoring		Third period	No scoring
Kristers Gudļevskis (34 saves / 36 shots)		Goalie stats	Jake Hildebrand (29 saves / 33 shots)

19 April 2023	Eisbären Berlin	5–3	Fischtown Pinguins	Uber Arena	Recap
Leonhard Pföderl (PP) – 18:27		First period	No scoring
Blaine Byron (EA) – 24:17; Leonhard Pföderl – 29:59; Jonas Müller – 38:07		Second period	28:39 – Jan Urbas; 31:58 – Jan Urbas (PP); 34:54 – Žiga Jeglič
Jonas Müller – 46:55		Third period	No scoring
Jake Hildebrand (30 saves / 33 shots)		Goalie stats	Kristers Gudļevskis (30 saves / 35 shots)

21 April 2023	Fischtown Pinguins	1–2	2OT	Eisbären Berlin	Eisarena Bremerhaven	Recap
No scoring		First period		16:47 – Ty Ronning
Alexander Friesen (PP2) – 21:38		Second period		No scoring
No scoring		Third period		No scoring
No scoring		Second overtime period		97:54 – Yannick Veilleux (EA)
Kristers Gudļevskis (47 saves / 48 shots)		Goalie stats		Jake Hildebrand (28 saves / 29 shots)

23 April 2023	Eisbären Berlin	4–1	Fischtown Pinguins	Uber Arena	Recap
Ty Ronning (PP) – 17:57		First period	No scoring
No scoring		Second period	31:41 – Phillip Bruggisser
Ty Ronning (PP) – 47:23; Ty Ronning – 55:17; Frederik Tiffels (EA) – 58:01		Third period	No scoring
Jake Hildebrand (26 saves / 27 shots)		Goalie stats	Kristers Gudļevskis (21 saves / 25 shots)

26 April 2023	Fischtown Pinguins	0–2	Eisbären Berlin	Eisarena Bremerhaven	Recap
No scoring		First period	No scoring
No scoring		Second period	No scoring
No scoring		Third period	43:21 – Leonhard Pföderl; 48:37 – Manuel Wiederer
Kristers Gudļevskis (23 saves / 25 shots)		Goalie stats	Jake Hildebrand (26 saves / 26 shots)

Berlin won series 4–1

== Statistics ==
=== Scoring leaders ===
List shows the top skaters sorted by points, then goals.

Player	Team	GP	G	A	Pts	+/−	PIM	POS
(Slovenia) Jan Urbas	Fischtown Pinguins	47	21	31	52	+20	16	F
(Canada) Gregor MacLeod	Kölner Haie	47	10	40	50	+14	20	F
(Slovenia) Žiga Jeglič	Fischtown Pinguins	52	14	36	50	+15	16	F
(United States) Kenny Agostino	Düsseldorfer EG	48	14	34	48	−2	26	F
(Germany) Marcel Noebels	Eisbären Berlin	50	13	34	47	+18	8	F
(Germany) Maximilian Kammerer	Kölner Haie	52	20	26	46	0	26	F
(Canada) Nicolas Mattinen	Straubing Tigers	52	16	30	46	+14	36	D
(United States) Andy Miele	Grizzlys Wolfsburg	52	14	32	46	0	47	F
(Germany) Matthias Plachta	Adler Mannheim	36	21	24	45	+13	20	F
(Canada) Michael Dal Colle	Iserlohn Roosters	50	16	29	45	−8	10	F

=== Leading goaltenders ===
Only the top five goaltenders, based on save percentage.

Player	Team	TOI	GA	GAA	SA	Sv%	SO
(Germany) Hannibal Weitzmann	Grizzlys Wolfsburg	661	22	2.00	332	93.79	1
(Germany) Maximilian Franzreb	Fischtown Pinguins	339	12	2.12	180	93.86	1
(Germany) Ilya Andryukhov	Fischtown Pinguins	134	4	1.79	48	92.31	0
(Germany) Florian Bugl	Straubing Tigers	1364	46	2.02	531	92.03	0
(Sweden) Joacim Eriksson	Schwenninger Wild Wings	2429	95	2.35	1066	91.82	3

== Awards ==
The awards were announced on 11 March 2024.

Award	Player
Player of the year	(Canada) Nicolas Mattinen
Goaltender of the year	(Latvia) Kristers Gudļevskis
Defenceman of the year	(Canada) Nicolas Mattinen
Forward of the year	(Germany) Justin Schütz
Youth player of the year	(Germany) Veit Oswald
Coach of the year	(Canada) Steve Walker
Finals MVP	(Germany) Leonhard Pföderl

== Attendances ==
#	Ice hockey club	Average attendance
1	Kölner Haie	16,993
2	Eisbären Berlin	13,804
3	Adler Mannheim	11,395
4	Düsseldorfer EG	8,905
5	Löwen Frankfurt	6,392
6	Augsburger Panther	5,793
7	Nürnberg Ice Tigers	5,651
8	Straubing Tigers	5,227
9	EHC Red Bull München	5,159
10	Schwenninger Wild Wings	4,739
11	Fischtown Pinguins	4,478
12	Iserlohn Roosters	4,288
13	ERC Ingolstadt	4,202
14	Grizzlys Wolfsburg	3,241
