= Richard Gelke =

German ice hockey player

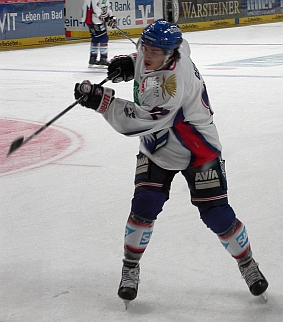
- Born: May 19, 1992 (age 32); Reutlingen, Germany
- Height: 6 ft 1 in (185 cm)
- Weight: 205 lb (93 kg; 14 st 9 lb)
- Position: Forward
- Shoots: Left
- DEL team Former teams: Schwenninger Wild Wings; Adler Mannheim
- NHL draft: Undrafted
- Playing career: 2010–present

Richard Gelke (born May 19, 1992) is a German professional ice hockey player who is currently playing for the Schwenninger Wild Wings in the Deutsche Eishockey Liga (DEL). After playing within the Adler Mannheim organization to begin his professional career, Gelke left to sign a one-year contract with Schwenninger Wild Wings for their return to the DEL on May 10, 2013.
