= Alexander Karachun =

German hockey player

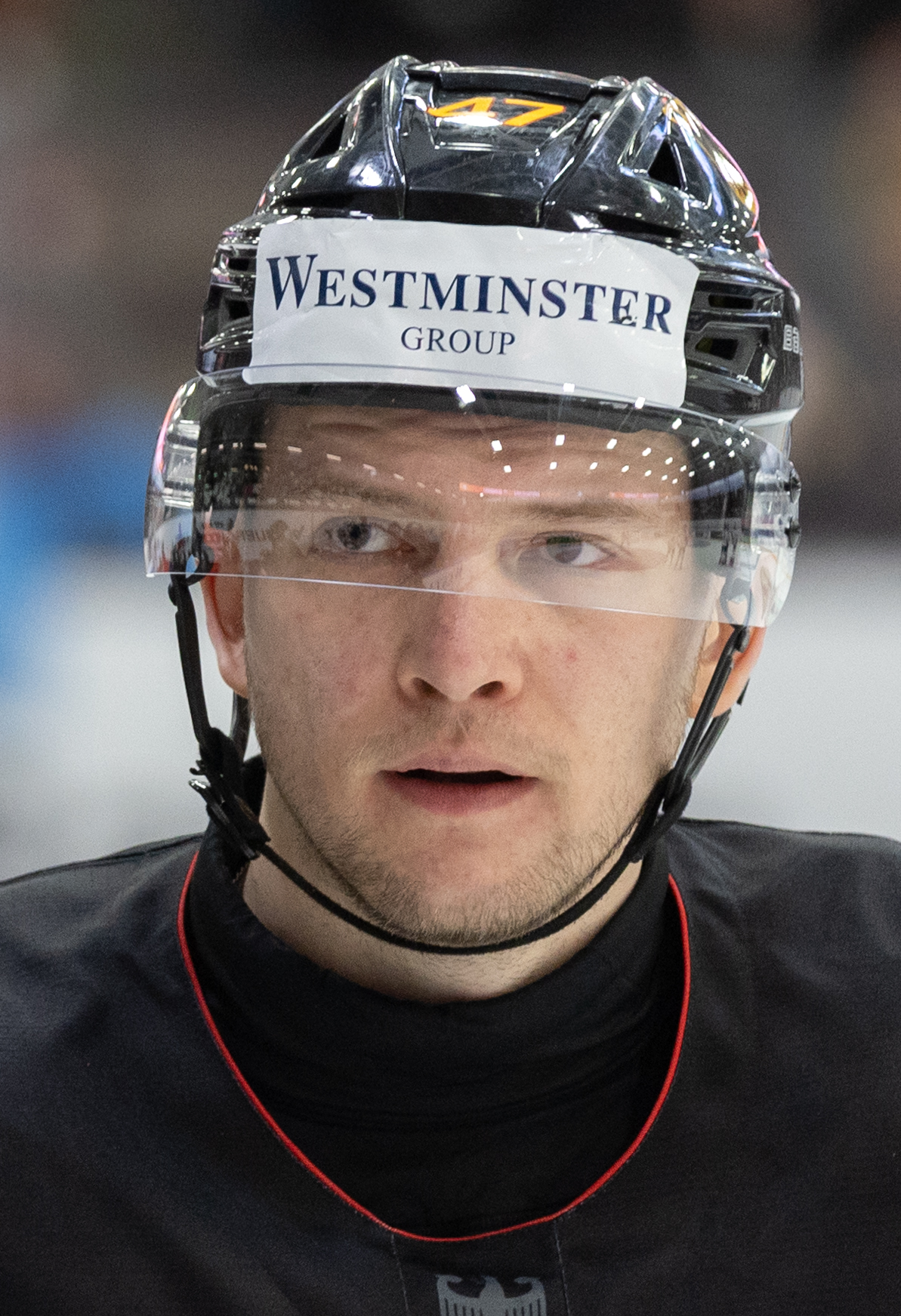
- Born: March 3, 1995 (age 31) Gdańsk, Poland
- Height: 188 cm (6 ft 2 in)
- Weight: 100 kg (220 lb; 15 st 10 lb)
- Position: Forward
- Shoots: Left
- DEL team Former teams: Schwenninger Wild Wings; Heilbronner Falken; EHC Freiburg; Grizzlys Wolfsburg; ETC Crimmitschau; Kassel Huskies; Düsseldorfer EG
- National team: Germany
- Playing career: 2011–present

Alexander Karachun (born March 3, 1995) is a German-Belarusian hockey forward, currently playing for the Schwenninger Wild Wings of the Deutsche Eishockey Liga (DEL). He has been under contract with Schwenningen since May 2021.

== Playing career ==
Alexander played for Heilbronner EC in his youth, which was also his father's final professional team. In the summer of 2010 Karachun began attending a hockey boarding school in the Austrian town of Sankt Pölten. He returned to Germany after three years to sign his first professional contract in 2014 with the Heilbronner Falken. In the 2014–15 season, Karachun played his first games in the DEL2. During the 2015–16 season, Karachun played for EHC Freiburg in the German second division.

In 2016, Karachun made the jump into the Deutsche Eishockey Liga, signing a contract with Grizzlys Wolfsburg. Through a program designed to help young talent develop, he was also allowed to play games for second division side Eispiraten Crimmitschau. During the 2019–20 season, Karachun transferred to the Kassel Huskies before signing a contract with first division side Düsseldorfer EG in April 2020. With Düsseldorf, Karachun scored 17 points in 36 games. Following his stint in Düsseldorf, Karachun joined the Schwenninger Wild Wings in May 2021.

== International ==
Karachun made his first appearance in international play as a member of the Germany national hockey team for the 2022 Men's Ice Hockey World Championships, recording two goals and one assist in five games.

== Personal life ==
Karachun, who was born in Gdańsk, is both a German and Belarusian citizen. He is the son of deceased professional hockey player Viktor Karachun, a Belarusian national who played for multiple teams in Germany.

== Career statistics ==
			Regular season					Playoffs/-downs
Season	Team	League	GP	G	A	Pts	PIM	GP	G	A	Pts	PIM
2014–15	Heilbronner Falken	DEL2	17	0	3	3	8	5	0	0	0	0
2014–15	Heilbronner EC II	Germany4	15	13	17	30	30	2	1	0	1	16
2015–16	EHC Freiburg	DEL2	52	12	8	20	28	7	1	1	2	24
2016-17	Grizzlys Wolfsburg	DEL	40	0	2	2	8	9	1	1	2	29
2016–17	ETC Crimmitschau	DEL2	8	0	1	1	27	—	—	—	—	—
2017–18	Grizzlys Wolfsburg	DEL	42	1	3	4	12	7	0	4	4	4
2017–18	ETC Crimmitschau	DEL2	7	2	2	4	4	—	—	—	—	—
2018–19	Grizzlys Wolfsburg	DEL	47	3	8	11	14	—	—	—	—	—
2018–19	Kassel Huskies	DEL2	9	2	4	6	4	—	—	—	—	—
2019–20	Kassel Huskies	DEL2	51	27	18	45	40	—	—	—	—	—
2020–21	Düsseldorfer EG	DEL	36	7	10	17	26	—	—	—	—	—
2021–22	Schwenninger Wild Wings	DEL	51	18	12	30	27	—	—	—	—	—
2022–23	Schwenninger Wild Wings	DEL	37	9	16	25	8	—	—	—	—	—
2023–24	Schwenninger Wild Wings	DEL	51	20	23	43	30	6	3	2	5	29
2024–25	Schwenninger Wild Wings	DEL	50	17	20	37	32	3	1	0	1	8
DEL totals			354	75	94	169	157	25	5	7	12	70

=== International ===
Year	Team	Event	Result	GP	G	A	Pts	PIM
2022	Germany	WC	7th	5	2	1	3	0
2026	Germany	WC	10th	1	1	1	2	0
Senior totals				6	3	2	5	0
