= Jordan Szwarz =

Canadian ice hockey player (born 1991)

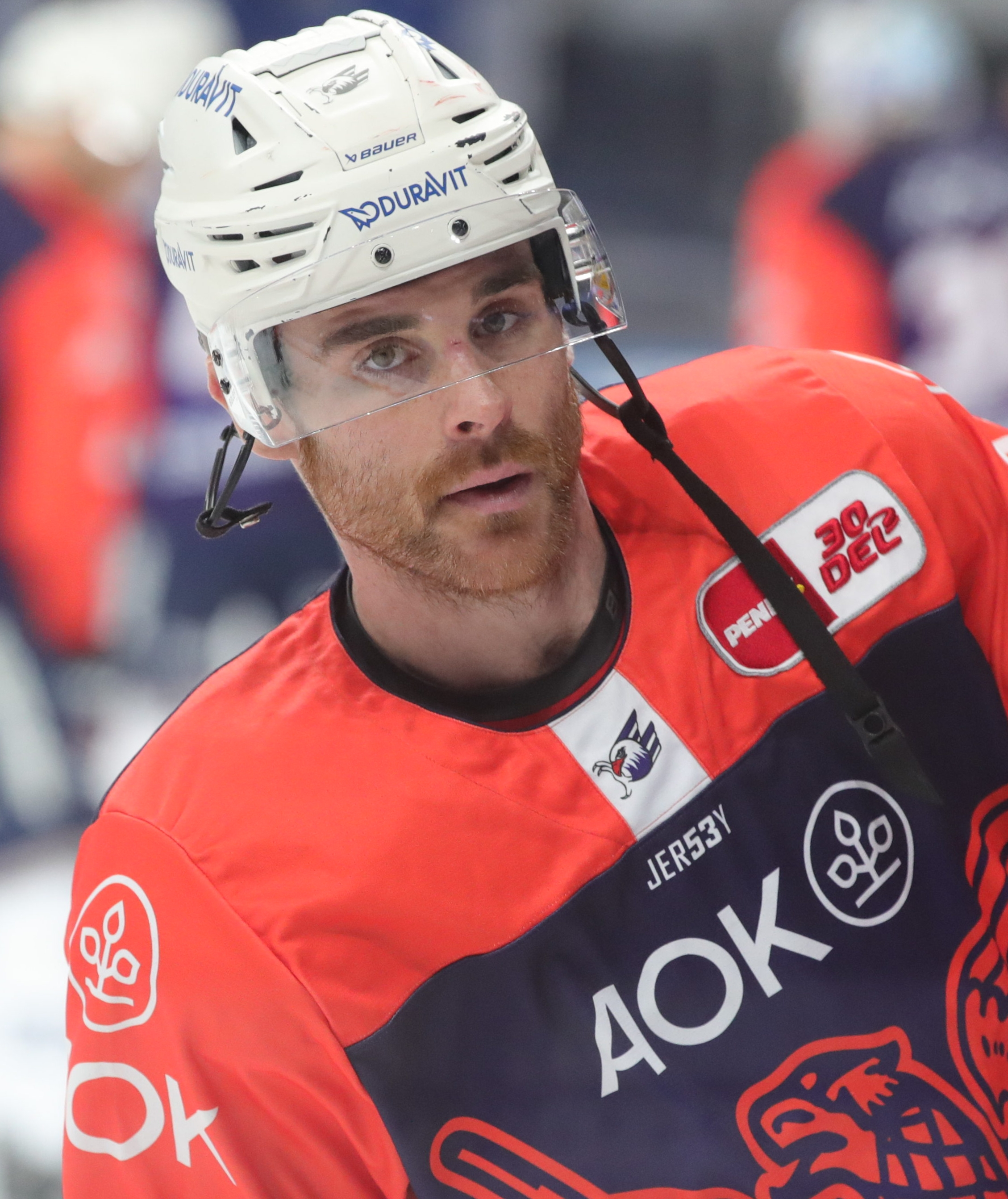
- Szwarz with Adler Mannheim in 2023
- Born: May 14, 1991 (age 35) Burlington, Ontario, Canada
- Height: 5 ft 11 in (180 cm)
- Weight: 190 lb (86 kg; 13 st 8 lb)
- Position: Right wing
- Shoots: Right
- team Former teams: Free agent Arizona Coyotes; Boston Bruins; Ottawa Senators; Torpedo Nizhny Novgorod; Adler Mannheim; Schwenninger Wild Wings
- NHL draft: 97th overall, 2009; Phoenix Coyotes
- Playing career: 2010–present

Jordan Szwarz (born May 14, 1991) is a Canadian professional ice hockey player. He is currently an unrestricted free agent who most recently played with the Schwenninger Wild Wings in the Deutsche Eishockey Liga (DEL). Szwarz was selected by the Phoenix Coyotes in the fourth round (97th overall) of the 2009 NHL entry draft. He later joined the Boston Bruins organization, before joining the Ottawa Senators as a free agent in July 2019.

== Playing career ==
=== Amateur ===
Szwarz was selected by the Saginaw Spirit of the Ontario Hockey League (OHL) in the second round, 25th overall in the 2007 OHL Priority Draft. He made his debut for the Spirit in the 2007–08 season, appearing in 65 games, scoring 12 goals and 21 assists for 33 points. The Spirit finished seventh in the OHL's Western Conference and faced the Sault Ste. Marie Greyhounds in the opening round of the playoffs. However, their playoff experience was short-lived as the team was swept in four games in their best-of-seven series. Szwarz went scoreless in the series.

For the 2008–09 season he made 67 appearances, scoring 17 goals and 51 points. Once again making the playoffs, the Spirit recorded the franchise's first playoff victory by sweeping the Guelph Storm. Moving on to the second round, they faced the London Knights who eliminated them. In eight playoff games, Szwarz added one goal and six points. In 2009–10 he added 26 goals and 54 points, as the Spirit faced the Kitchener Rangers in the first round of the playoffs. The Rangers knocked the Spirit out of contention winning their best-of-seven series in six games. Szwarz tallied one goal and three points in the six games.

In his final OHL season in 2010–11 with the Spirit, Szwarz was named the team's captain as voted on by the players. He established new highs in goals with 27 and points with 66 in 65 appearances. The Spirit advanced past the Guelph Storm in the first round to face the Windsor Spitfires, only to be eliminated in the second round again. Szwarz added four goals and 13 points in 12 playoff games. He was recognised as the team's Most Valuable Player and was awarded the Heart and Soul Award at the end of the season. He was the team's third all-time leading scorer with 204 career points by the end of his OHL career.

=== Professional ===
==== Phoenix Coyotes ====
Szwarz was selected by the Phoenix Coyotes of the National Hockey League (NHL) in the fourth round, 97th overall, of the 2009 NHL entry draft. He was signed to an amateur try-out contract with the San Antonio Rampage of the American Hockey League (AHL) on March 31, 2010. Szwarz made his professional debut with the Rampage in the 2009–10 season, appearing in one game, going scoreless. On June 1, 2011 it was announced that he had signed an entry-level contract with the Coyotes.

In his first full professional season in 2011–12, Szwarz was assigned to the Portland Pirates of the AHL. He put up seven goals and 20 points in 53 games in his rookie season. The Pirates finished third in the Atlantic Division but missed the playoffs. He was returned to Portland for the 2012–13 season, but his season was shortened due to a shoulder injury. In 60 games he recorded 11 goals and 33 points. He began the 2013–14 season with Portland, and was named the team's captain. He was recalled by Phoenix for the first time on October 28, 2013 and made his NHL debut on October 29, playing eight minutes and 16 seconds for the Coyotes in a 3–1 win over the Los Angeles Kings. His first NHL goal was scored in his next NHL game, on October 31 against Carter Hutton of the Nashville Predators. He was named the first star of the game. He split the next three months between Phoenix and Portland, before finishing the season in the AHL. He recorded three goals in 26 games with the Coyotes and eight goals and 14 points in 27 games with the Pirates. The Pirates finished last in their division and missed the playoffs.

As a restricted free agent in the offseason, the Coyotes re-signed him to a two-year, two-way contract on July 15. He was sent to Portland to start the 2014–15 season, but missed six weeks with a lower body injury. He was recalled for the first time by the renamed Arizona Coyotes on March 23, 2015, and made his NHL season debut on March 24. In nine games with Arizona, he scored one goal. He was returned to Portland in April, which had finished fourth in the Atlantic Division and qualified for the playoffs. In 45 regular season games, he tallied nine goals and 23 points. The Pirates lost to the Manchester Monarchs in the first round best-of-five series. In five playoff games, he added one goal and three points.

Going into the 2015–16 season, the Coyotes changed their AHL affiliate to the Springfield Falcons. However, Szwarz suffered an injury before training camp and missed all of it. He was assigned to Springfield at the end of September. He spent the entire season in Springfield making 56 appearances, scoring 12 goals and 23 points. Springfield finished last in the Atlantic Division and missed the playoffs.

==== Boston Bruins ====
In the offseason, Szwarz could not find an NHL deal and signed a one-year with the Providence Bruins of the AHL. He set new career highs with 22 goals and 54 points in 65 games in the 2016–17 season. Providence finished fourth in the Atlantic Division and qualified for the playoffs, where they advanced to the Eastern Conference final, losing to the Syracuse Crunch. Szwarz tallied six goals and 11 points in 17 playoff games. As a result, the Boston Bruins signed him to a one-year, two-way deal on July 1, 2017. He was assigned to Boston's AHL affiliate, the Providence Bruins, to start the 2017–18 season. He was recalled by Boston on November 1 after forward David Backes was injured. He made his Boston debut on November 2 in a 2–1 victory over the Vegas Golden Knights, marking his first NHL game since 2015. He recorded his first points for Boston, tallying two assists in a 5–3 win over the Minnesota Wild on November 7. On November 22, he was returned to Providence having appeared in nine games, registering three assists. He was recalled on an emergency basis by Boston twice more during the season before being sent to the minors for the final time on March 30, 2018. That same day, Szwarz was signed to a one-year, two-way contract extension. In 12 games with Boston, he recorded three points. Providence finished fourth once again and made the playoffs, but were eliminated in the first round by the Lehigh Valley Phantoms. In 52 regular season games, he scored 21 goals and 48 points for Providence and in four playoff games, two goals and four points. Ahead of the 2018–19 season, Szwarz was placed on waivers by Boston. After going unclaimed, he was assigned to Providence. He was named the AHL Bruins' captain. He spent the entire season with Providence, scoring 23 goals and 46 points in 68 games. In January 2019, he replaced the injured Ryan Fitzgerald as the player representing Providence at the 2019 AHL All-Star Classic. Providence finished fourth in their division for the third consecutive year. They made the playoffs but were eliminated in the first round for the second consecutive year, this time by the Charlotte Checkers.

==== Ottawa Senators ====
After three seasons within the Bruins organization, Szwarz left as an unrestricted free agent to sign a one-year, two-way contract with the Ottawa Senators on July 1, 2019. Acquired to add depth to the Senators organization, Szwarz was assigned to their AHL affiliate, the Belleville Senators, to begin the 2019–20 season. His stint in Belleville was short as he was recalled by Ottawa on October 14, replacing the injured Artem Anisimov. He made his Ottawa debut that night in a 2–0 loss to the Minnesota Wild. He appeared in two more games Szwarz and went scoreless before being returned to the AHL on October 20. In November, he was named the team's captain, the third in team history. In the AHL he collected 18 goals and 36 points through 48 regular season games before the season was cancelled due to the COVID-19 pandemic.

==== Europe ====
As an impending free agent, Szwarz opted to embark on a career abroad by agreeing to a one-year contract with Russian club Torpedo Nizhny Novgorod of the Kontinental Hockey League (KHL) on July 22, 2020. In his lone season in the KHL, he recorded ten goals 27 points in 51 games. Torpedo made the playoffs, but were eliminated by Ak Bars Kazan in the opening round. In two playoff games, Szwarz went scoreless.

Szwarz left Russia and signed a two-year contract with German club, Adler Mannheim of the Deutsche Eishockey Liga (DEL), on May 17, 2021. In his first season in the DEL in 2021–22, he tallied 14 goals and 37 points in 48 games. In the playoffs he added four goals and eight points in nine games. In his second season in 2022–23, he saw a decline in scoring, only marking nine goals and 28 points in 45 games. In four playoff games he scored once. On November 30, 2022, his contract was extended by Mannheim to 2025. In 2023–24, he recorded nine goals and 16 points in 36 games, with two goals and seven points in seven playoff games. In his final season with Mannheim in 2024–25, his scoring craters, tallying only seven goals and 14 points in 35 games. He put up only two assists in seven playoff games. On June 6, 2025, the now free agent Szwarz signed a contract with Schwenninger Wild Wings of the DEL. In 45 games with the Wild Wings he tallied six goals and 26 points and added four more assists in seven games during the playoffs.

== Career statistics ==
			Regular season					Playoffs
Season	Team	League	GP	G	A	Pts	PIM	GP	G	A	Pts	PIM
2007–08	Saginaw Spirit	OHL	65	12	21	33	56	4	0	0	0	2
2008–09	Saginaw Spirit	OHL	67	17	34	51	76	8	1	5	6	10
2009–10	Saginaw Spirit	OHL	65	26	28	54	82	6	1	2	3	0
2009–10	San Antonio Rampage	AHL	1	0	0	0	0	—	—	—	—	—
2010–11	Saginaw Spirit	OHL	65	27	39	66	90	12	4	9	13	8
2011–12	Portland Pirates	AHL	58	7	13	20	28	—	—	—	—	—
2012–13	Portland Pirates	AHL	60	11	22	33	31	—	—	—	—	—
2013–14	Portland Pirates	AHL	27	8	6	14	55	—	—	—	—	—
2013–14	Phoenix Coyotes	NHL	26	3	0	3	19	—	—	—	—	—
2014–15	Portland Pirates	AHL	45	9	13	22	65	5	1	2	3	8
2014–15	Arizona Coyotes	NHL	9	1	0	1	2	—	—	—	—	—
2015–16	Springfield Falcons	AHL	56	12	11	23	31	—	—	—	—	—
2016–17	Providence Bruins	AHL	65	22	32	54	76	17	6	5	11	18
2017–18	Providence Bruins	AHL	52	21	27	48	37	4	1	2	3	12
2017–18	Boston Bruins	NHL	12	0	3	3	2	—	—	—	—	—
2018–19	Providence Bruins	AHL	68	23	23	46	56	4	2	2	4	12
2019–20	Belleville Senators	AHL	46	18	18	36	40	—	—	—	—	—
2019–20	Ottawa Senators	NHL	3	0	0	0	2	—	—	—	—	—
2020–21	Torpedo Nizhny Novgorod	KHL	51	10	17	27	39	2	0	0	0	2
2021–22	Adler Mannheim	DEL	48	14	23	37	27	9	4	4	8	6
2022–23	Adler Mannheim	DEL	45	9	19	28	37	4	1	0	1	2
2023–24	Adler Mannheim	DEL	36	9	7	16	25	7	2	5	7	2
2024–25	Adler Mannheim	DEL	35	7	7	14	32	7	0	2	2	7
2025–26	Schwenninger Wild Wings	DEL	45	6	20	26	17	7	0	4	4	7
NHL totals			50	4	3	7	25	—	—	—	—	—
KHL totals			51	10	17	27	39	2	0	0	0	2

== Bibliography ==
- Chaimovitch, Jason, ed. (2025). 2025–2026 American Hockey League Official Guide & Record Book. Springfield, Massachusetts: American Hockey League. OCLC 22147888.
