= Jake Hildebrand =

American ice hockey player

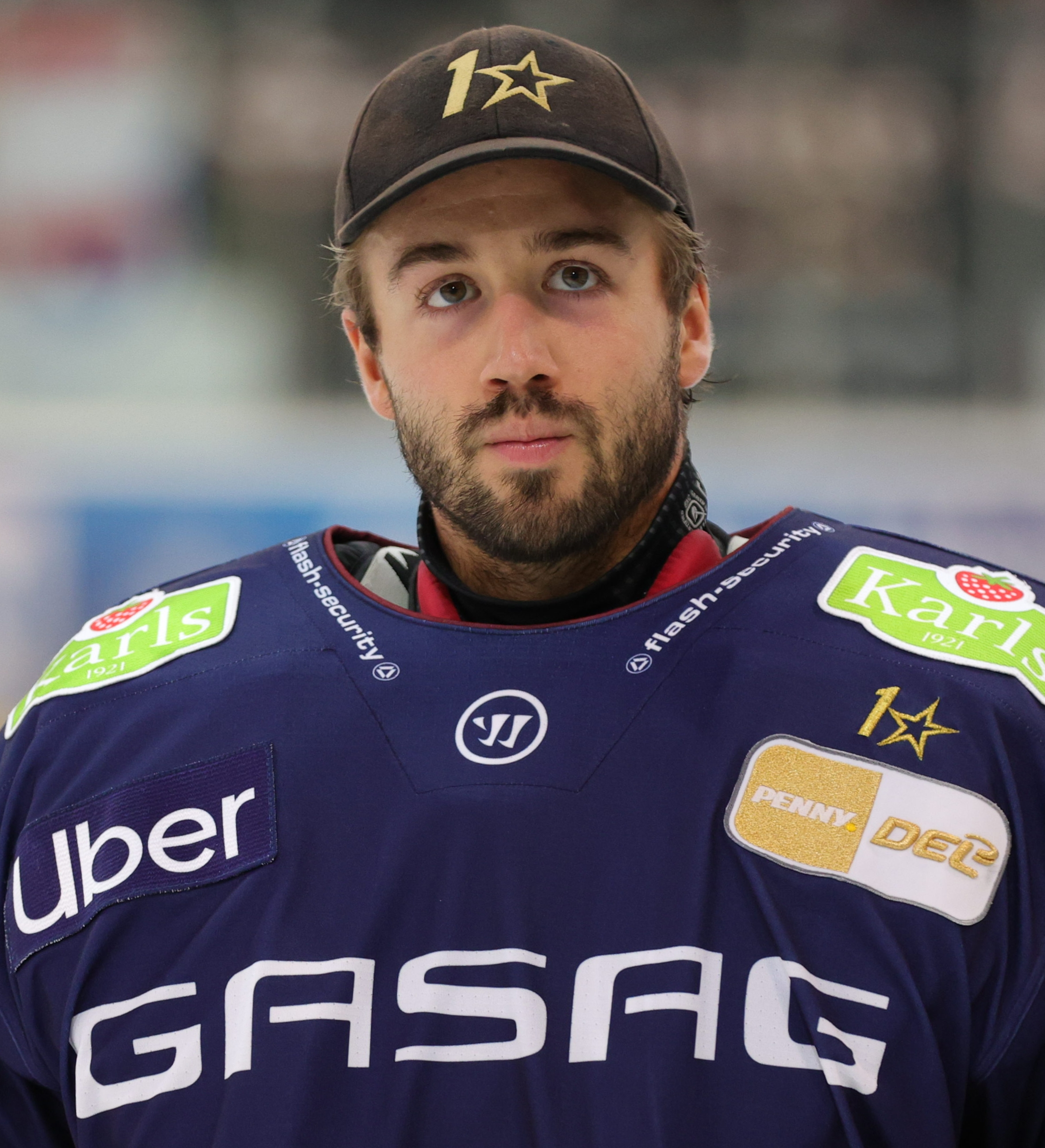
- Hildebrand with the Eisbären Berlin in 2024
- Born: June 19, 1993 (age 32) Butler, Pennsylvania, U.S.
- Height: 5 ft 11 in (180 cm)
- Weight: 182 lb (83 kg; 13 st 0 lb)
- Position: Goaltender
- Catches: Left
- DEL team Former teams: Eisbären Berlin; Rockford IceHogs; Löwen Frankfurt
- NHL draft: Undrafted
- Playing career: 2016–present

Jake Hildebrand (born June 19, 1993) is an American ice hockey goaltender who is currently playing for the Eisbären Berlin of the Deutsche Eishockey Liga (DEL).

== Playing career ==
In 2012, Hildebrand enrolled at Michigan State University to play NCAA Men's Division I college hockey with the Michigan State Spartans of the Big Ten Conference. In his junior year, Hildebrand's outstanding play was recognized when he was selected the 2014–15 Big Ten Best Goaltender and Big Ten Player of the Year. He was also named to the NCAA (West) First All-American Team. At the end of his 2015–16 season with the Spartans, he signed with the Allen Americans of the ECHL.

As a free agent embarking on his professional career, Hildebrand agreed to a one-year contract with the Rockford IceHogs of the American Hockey League on June 15, 2016. In the 2016–17 season, Hildebrand appeared in just 3 games with the IceHogs as a depth goaltender, appearing primarily with the ECHL affiliate Indy Fuel.

Unable to mark an impression with the IceHogs, Hildebrand left as a free agent and signed a one-year deal to continue in the ECHL with the Tulsa Oilers on August 3, 2017. In the 2017–18 season, Hildebrand assumed starting goaltender duties, appearing in 44 games with the Oilers and posting a .901 save percentage.

In the off-season, Hildebrand was traded by the Oilers to the Kalamazoo Wings in exchange for Scott Henegar on July 24, 2018.

With the Wings going on hiatus for the pandemic-affected 2020–21 season, Hildebrand was signed as a free agent by the Florida Everblades of the ECHL on January 12, 2021. In the delayed 2020-21 season, Hildebrand established career highs and was the standout goaltender in the league, posting 23 wins and a 2.40 goals-against average and a .923 save percentage to be named the ECHL Goaltender of the Year.

After six seasons within the ECHL, Hildebrand opted to pursue a career abroad, agreeing to a one-year contract with German club Löwen Frankfurt of the DEL2, on July 23, 2021.

Helping Frankfurt gain promotion to the DEL for the following 2022–23 season, Hildebrand posted 22 wins through 50 regular season games with Frankfurt in their first season in the top tier. After their defeat in the playoff qualifiers to Düsseldorfer EG, Hildebrand left Löwen Frankfurt at the end of his contract on March 19, 2023.

On June 13, 2023, Hildebrand opted to remain in the DEL, signing a one-year contract with Eisbären Berlin for the 2023–24 season.

== Career statistics ==
| | | | Regular season | | | | | | | | | Playoffs |
| Season | Team | League | GP | W | L | OT | MIN | GA | SO | GAA | SV% | GP | W | L | MIN | GA | SO | GAA | SV% |
|---|---|---|---|---|---|---|---|---|---|---|---|---|---|---|---|---|---|---|---|
| 2009–10 | Sioux City Musketeers | USHL | 4 | 1 | 1 | 0 | 190 | 8 | 0 | 2.52 | .912 | — | — | — | — | — | — | — | — |
| 2010–11 | Sioux City Musketeers | USHL | 21 | 8 | 9 | 1 | 1139 | 51 | 0 | 2.69 | .901 | — | — | — | — | — | — | — | — |
| 2011-12 | Cedar Rapids RoughRiders | USHL | 43 | 20 | 14 | 7 | 2428 | 113 | 2 | 2.79 | .913 | 2 | 0 | 2 | 125 | 8 | 0 | 3.84 | 900 |
| 2012–13 | Michigan State University | CCHA | 29 | 9 | 17 | 2 | 1659 | 65 | 2 | 2.35 | .928 | — | — | — | — | — | — | — | — |
| 2013–14 | Michigan State University | CCHA | 32 | 9 | 15 | 7 | 1891 | 77 | 2 | 2.44 | .923 | — | — | — | — | — | — | — | — |
| 2014–15 | Michigan State University | CCHA | 35 | 17 | 16 | 2 | 2094 | 76 | 6 | 2.18 | .930 | — | — | — | — | — | — | — | — |
| 2015–16 | Michigan State University | CCHA | 37 | 10 | 22 | 3 | 2133 | 111 | 3 | 3.12 | .904 | — | — | — | — | — | — | — | — |
| 2015–16 | Allen Americans | ECHL | 6 | 5 | 1 | 0 | 364 | 14 | 0 | 2.31 | .925 | 8 | 3 | 2 | 344 | 20 | 0 | 3.49 | .894 |
| 2016–17 | Indy Fuel | ECHL | 47 | 18 | 21 | 5 | 2671 | 167 | 4 | 3.75 | .899 | — | — | — | — | — | — | — | — |
| 2016–17 | Rockford IceHogs | AHL | 3 | 0 | 1 | 1 | 131 | 10 | 0 | 4.58 | .868 | — | — | — | — | — | — | — | — |
| 2017–18 | Tulsa Oilers | ECHL | 44 | 16 | 18 | 7 | 2367 | 132 | 0 | 3.35 | .901 | — | — | — | — | — | — | — | — |
| 2018–19 | Kalamazoo Wings | ECHL | 46 | 21 | 18 | 2 | 2447 | 146 | 1 | 3.58 | .890 | 5 | 2 | 3 | 273 | 10 | 1 | 2.20 | .913 |
| 2019–20 | Kalamazoo Wings | ECHL | 39 | 16 | 18 | 4 | 2296 | 134 | 1 | 3.50 | .889 | — | — | — | — | — | — | — | — |
| 2020–21 | Florida Everblades | ECHL | 40 | 23 | 10 | 5 | 2380 | 95 | 2 | 2.40 | .923 | 5 | 2 | 3 | 274 | 15 | 0 | 3.28 | .885 |
| 2021–22 | Löwen Frankfurt | DEL2 | 34 | 24 | 10 | 0 | 2034 | 68 | 5 | 2.01 | .930 | 12 | 12 | 0 | 726 | 19 | 2 | 1.57 | .947 |
| 2022–23 | Löwen Frankfurt | DEL | 50 | 22 | 26 | 0 | 2943 | 137 | 1 | 2.79 | .912 | 2 | 0 | 2 | 118 | 10 | 0 | 5.06 | .836 |
| 2023–24 | Eisbären Berlin | DEL | 37 | 26 | 10 | 0 | 2197 | 86 | 3 | 2.35 | .916 | 15 | 12 | 3 | 973 | 31 | 1 | 1.91 | .936 |
| 2024–25 | Eisbären Berlin | DEL | 35 | 23 | 12 | 0 | 2122 | 102 | 1 | 2.88 | .890 | 9 | 8 | 1 | 553 | 7 | 4 | 0.76 | .968 |
| ECHL totals | | | 222 | 99 | 86 | 23 | 12,525 | 688 | 8 | 3.30 | .901 | 18 | 7 | 7 | 891 | 45 | 1 | 3.03 | .897 |

== Awards and honors ==
| Award | Year |
College
| Big Ten Best Goaltender | 2014–15 |
| Big Ten Player of the Year | 2014–15 |
| Big Ten First All-Star Team | 2014–15 |
| NCAA (West) First All-American Team | 2014–15 |
ECHL
| All-ECHL First Team | 2020–21 |
| Goaltender of the Year | 2020–21 |
DEL2
| Champions (Löwen Frankfurt) | 2022 |
DEL
| Champions (Eisbären Berlin) | 2024, 2025, 2026 |

Awards and achievements
| Preceded by Adam Wilcox | Big Ten Player of the Year; 2014–15 | Succeeded by Kyle Connor |
| Preceded by Adam Wilcox | Big Ten Goaltender of the Year; 2014–15 | Succeeded by Eric Schierhorn |
