= Kristers Gudļevskis =

Latvian ice hockey player (born 1992)

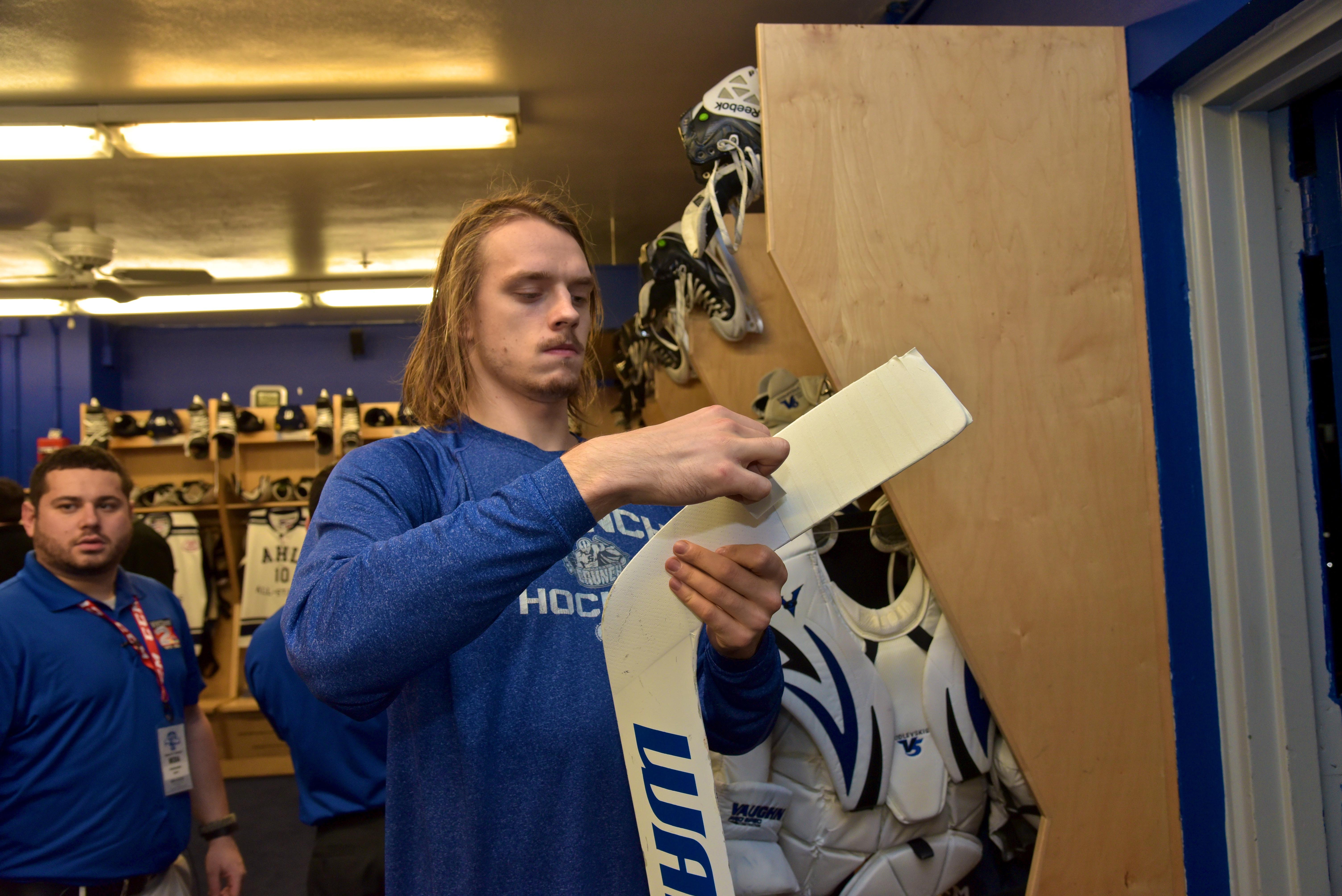
- Gudļevskis with the Syracuse Crunch in 2016
- Born: 31 July 1992 (age 34) Aizkraukle, Latvia
- Height: 6 ft 4 in (193 cm)
- Weight: 197 lb (89 kg; 14 st 1 lb)
- Position: Goaltender
- Catches: Left
- DEL team Former teams: Fischtown Pinguins; HK Ogre; Dinamo Riga; Tampa Bay Lightning; EC VSV; HC Slovan Bratislava; Brynäs IF; Modo Hockey
- National team: Latvia
- NHL draft: 124th overall, 2013; Tampa Bay Lightning
- Playing career: 2009–present

Kristers Gudļevskis (born 31 July 1992) is a Latvian professional ice hockey player who is a goaltender for the Fischtown Pinguins of the Deutsche Eishockey Liga (DEL). Gudļevskis was selected by the Tampa Bay Lightning in the fifth round, 124th overall, of the 2013 NHL entry draft.

Gudļevskis is the only player to have played in the ECHL, AHL, NHL, Olympic Games, and IIHF World Championships in the same season.

== Playing career ==
=== Europe ===
Gudļevskis started his professional career in the 2009–10 season playing for HK Ogre of the Latvian Hockey League. In the following season, he moved on to play for Dinamo Riga affiliate HK Rīga of the Minor Hockey League (MHL). He played for three seasons with HK Rīga. Throughout the 2010–11 and 2011–12 seasons, he made the Dinamo Riga roster several times as a healthy scratch. On 5 October 2012, he finally made his debut during a 2–1 overtime win against Vityaz Chekhov, replacing injured Mikael Tellqvist after the second period tied at 0–0. Later in the season he played his first full game as a starter in a 2–0 loss against Sibir Novosibirsk.

=== Tampa Bay Lightning ===
Gudļevskis is only the second (after Artūrs Irbe) and highest-ranked Latvian goaltender ever selected in the NHL entry draft. Dinamo Riga agreed to release Gudļevskis from the final year of his contract; he later signed a three-year entry-level contract with the Tampa Bay Lightning of the National Hockey League (NHL).

Following the Lightning's 2013 pre-season camp, he was reassigned to their ECHL affiliate, the Florida Everblades. While attending pre-season training camp with the Everblades, Gudļevskis was recalled to join the Lightning. He was later reassigned to the Everblades without making the Lightning roster, and made his official North American debut with 20 saves in a 4–1 win over the Orlando Solar Bears.

Gudļevskis was recalled to the Syracuse Crunch of the AHL on 24 October 2013, due to an injury to Riku Helenius. He made his AHL debut on 26 October 2013, with a shutout against the Bridgeport Sound Tigers. Gudļevskis became the fifth goaltender in Crunch history to post a shutout upon debut. After four games with the Crunch, Gudļevskis once again was reassigned to the Everblades. On 7 December 2013, Gudļevskis was promoted to the Syracuse Crunch in order to give him more AHL ice time. Gudļevskis cemented his place on the Crunch roster posting ten wins in 21 games. On 15 January 2014, Gudļevskis was named the CCM/AHL Player of the Week.

On 31 January 2014, due to injuries of Ben Bishop and Anders Lindbäck, Gudļevskis received an emergency call-up to the Lightning along with Cédrick Desjardins. Kristers made his first NHL start on 11 April 2014, in a game between the Lightning and the Columbus Blue Jackets, he stopped 36 shots in a 3–2 win for the Lightning. He made his NHL playoffs debut after replacing Lindbäck mid-game on 18 April 2014 against the Montreal Canadiens in the second game of the first round. He replaced Lindbäck in game four of the series as well. During this season, Gudļevskis became the first goalie in the sport's history to play in an ECHL, AHL, NHL and Olympics in the same season, which also included his Stanley Cup playoffs debut.

On 10 June 2015, in game four of the 2015 Stanley Cup Finals against the Chicago Blackhawks, Gudļevskis became the backup goalie for fellow prospect Andrei Vasilevskiy, who started the game after Ben Bishop was injured in game two (Bishop played injured in game three).

On 24 October 2015, Gudļevskis played in his second NHL regular season game against the Chicago Blackhawks, stopping 31 shots. Though he had a great effort, he lost in overtime 1–0, when a backhand shot taken from Jonathan Toews slipped by him.

On 2 July 2016, the Lightning announced the re-signing of Gudļevskis to a one-year, two-way contract. Gudļevskis played in 41 games with the Syracuse Crunch in the 2015–16 AHL season, posting a 16–12–8 record with a 2.83 goals-against average and a .907 save percentage.

=== New York Islanders ===
On 1 July 2017, Gudļevskis was traded by the Lightning to the New York Islanders in exchange for Carter Verhaeghe. On 11 July 2017, Gudļevskis signed a one-year, two-way contract with the Islanders. In the following 2017–18 season, Gudļevskis was assigned to AHL affiliate, the Bridgeport Sound Tigers for the duration of the year. In splitting starting duties, he recorded 12 wins in 37 games.

=== Return to Europe ===
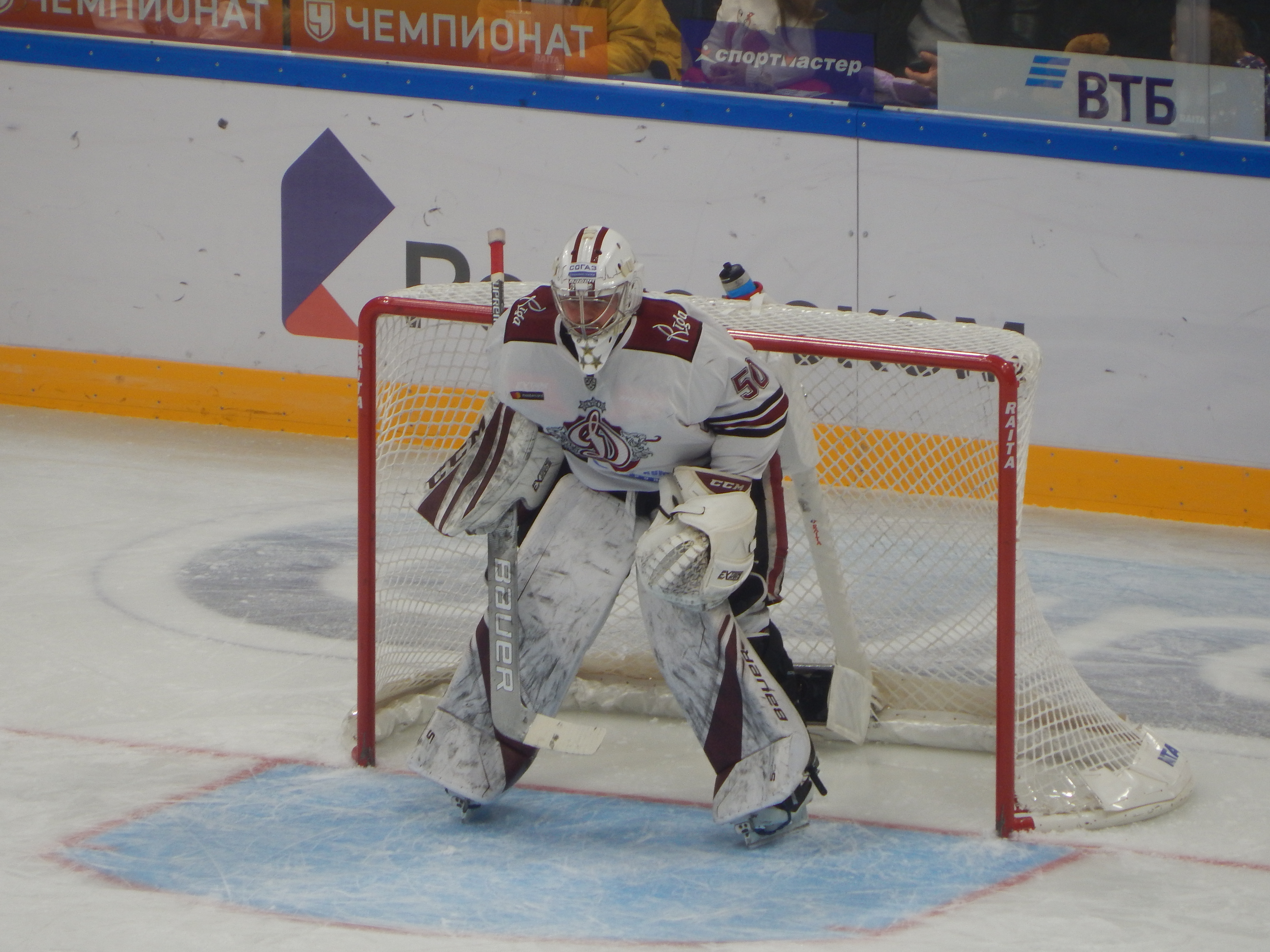
Gudļevskis with Dinamo Riga in 2019.

An impending restricted free agent with the Islanders and his NHL prospects stalling after five seasons in North America, Gudļevskis opted to return home, agreeing to a one-year deal with former club Dinamo Riga of the KHL on 21 June 2018. He was released on 1 October 2019, after posting a 3.45 GAA and a .863 save percentage in just nine games.

On 2 December 2019, he signed a contract with the Fischtown Pinguins of the Deutsche Eishockey Liga (DEL).

On 8 October 2020, Gudļevskis signed a one-year contract with EC VSV of the ICE Hockey League.

On 6 February 2021, he signed with HC Slovan Bratislava of the Slovak Extraliga, and then extended his contract with the team on 10 May.

On 1 January 2022, Gudļevskis joined Brynäs IF of the Swedish Hockey League (SHL) until the end of the 2021–22 season.

On 13 June 2022, Gudļevskis signed a one-year contract with Modo Hockey of HockeyAllsvenskan. Gudļevskis had an impressive season with Modo Hockey, posting a 1.88 GAA in 39 regular season games with the club, and also helped lead the team win the league, promoting them to the SHL for the following season.

A free agent, Gudļevskis left Modo after securing a two-year contract with his former club, the Fischtown Pinguins of the DEL, on 16 May 2023. At 2024 with his hockey club Fischtown Pinguins lost the final game and get a vice-champion title of Deutsche Eishockey Liga.

== International play ==
Medal record

Representing Latvia

Ice hockey

World Championships
Bronze medal – third place	2023 Finland/Latvia	

Gudļevskis became the starting goaltender for Team Latvia in the 2013 IIHF World Championship after original starter Edgars Masaļskis could not recover game form coming from injury. He registered a 2–2 win-loss record and was named one of the tournament's three best players for Team Latvia.

On 7 January 2014, Gudļevskis was named to the Latvian national team roster for the Sochi 2014 Winter Olympics. Latvia entered the qualification playoff stage ranked as one of the lowest seeds (ahead of only Norway), amassing no points in group play. In the second round, Gudļevskis got the start in the matchup against reigning Olympic champions Canada, despite the Latvian team upsetting Switzerland earlier with Masaļskis.

In what was expected to be a routine victory for the Canadian squad, the Latvian team responded with an early equalizer and managed to stay alive behind Gudļevskis' goaltending (saving 55 of 57 shots he faced) until late into the third period, eventually falling in a 2–1 loss. Gudļevskis was praised, especially in Canadian media and sports commentary, for his performance in the quarter-final against the Canadian national team.

Gudlevskis was the backup goaltender for the Latvia at the 2023 IIHF World Championship, in which Latvia made history, winning a bronze medal, Latvia's first ever IIHF World Championship medal. Although he dressed for a majority of the team's games, he did not play in any.

== Career statistics ==
=== Regular season and playoffs ===
Bold indicates led league

			Regular season									Playoffs
Season	Team	League	GP	W	L	OTL	MIN	GA	SO	GAA	SV%	GP	W	L	MIN	GA	SO	GAA	SV%
2009–10	HK Ogre	LHL	9	—	—	—	—	—	—	6.12	—	—	—	—	—	—	—	—	—
2010–11	HK Riga	MHL	49	26	16	2	2,760	101	7	2.20	.920	3	0	3	187	13	0	4.16	.862
2011–12	HK Riga	MHL	40	16	16	5	2,285	91	1	2.39	.918	4	1	3	257	15	0	3.50	.896
2012–13	HK Riga	MHL	56	27	18	11	3,190	111	3	2.09	.927	3	0	3	153	19	0	7.42	.747
2012–13	Dinamo Riga	KHL	2	1	1	0	82	3	0	2.18	.921	—	—	—	—	—	—	—	—
2013–14	Florida Everblades	ECHL	11	7	4	0	656	20	2	1.83	.925	—	—	—	—	—	—	—	—
2013–14	Syracuse Crunch	AHL	34	18	11	4	1,901	85	5	2.68	.901	—	—	—	—	—	—	—	—
2013–14	Tampa Bay Lightning	NHL	1	1	0	0	60	2	0	2.00	.947	2	0	1	40	2	0	3.00	.900
2014–15	Syracuse Crunch	AHL	42	24	12	3	2,429	109	2	2.69	.905	3	0	3	145	12	0	4.96	.833
2015–16	Syracuse Crunch	AHL	41	16	12	2	2,332	110	1	2.83	.907	—	—	—	—	—	—	—	—
2015–16	Tampa Bay Lightning	NHL	1	0	0	1	60	1	0	1.00	.969	—	—	—	—	—	—	—	—
2016–17	Syracuse Crunch	AHL	37	15	10	4	1,947	86	0	2.65	.897	1	0	0	38	0	0	0.00	1.000
2016–17	Tampa Bay Lightning	NHL	1	0	0	0	12	0	0	0.00	1.00	—	—	—	—	—	—	—	—
2017–18	Bridgeport Sound Tigers	AHL	37	12	16	5	2,037	96	3	2.83	.897	—	—	—	—	—	—	—	—
2018–19	Dinamo Riga	KHL	31	9	17	4	1669	66	2	2.37	.910	—	—	—	—	—	—	—	—
2019–20	Dinamo Riga	KHL	9	3	6	0	504	29	1	3.45	.863	—	—	—	—	—	—	—	—
2019–20	Fischtown Pinguins	DEL	25	16	9	0	1,517	67	0	2.65	.904	—	—	—	—	—	—	—	—
2020–21	EC VSV	ICEHL	27	9	13	3	1,544	72	0	2.80	.913	—	—	—	—	—	—	—	—
2020–21	HC Slovan Bratislava	Slovak	7	—	—	—	420	18	0	2.57	.914	4	—	—	—	—	—	13.99	.756
2021–22	HC Slovan Bratislava	Slovak	17	12	4	1	928	39	0	2.52	.909	—	—	—	—	—	—	—	—
2021–22	Brynäs IF	SHL	5	1	2	0	180	6	0	2.00	.921	1	0	0	17	3	0	10.62	.727
2022–23	Modo Hockey	Allsv	39	27	11	0	2,366	74	5	1.88	.920	15	11	4	946	33	3	2.09	.918
2023–24	Fischtown Pinguins	DEL	45	31	14	0	2,665	93	2	2.09	.914	14	9	5	891	32	2	2.16	.921
2024–25	Fischtown Pinguins	DEL	28	18	10	0	1,694	54	5	**1.91**	**.930**	6	2	4	355	18	0	3.04	.892
2025-26	Fischtown Pinguins	DEL	15	8	7	0	905	34	1	2.26	.921	5	2	3	254	16	1	3.78	.882
KHL totals			42	13	24	4	2,255	98	3	2.61	.901	14	9	5	—	—	2	2.16	.921
NHL totals			3	1	0	1	132	3	0	1.37	.959	2	0	1	40	2	0	3.00	.900

=== International ===
Year	Team	Event	Result	GP	W	L	T	MIN	GA	SO	GAA	SV%
2010	Latvia	WJC18	9th	6	0	4	0	339	29	0	5.13	.856
2011	Latvia	WJC-D1	P	1	1	0	0	60	1	0	1.00	.941
2012	Latvia	WJC	9th	5	1	4	0	279	24	0	5.15	.865
2013	Latvia	WC	11th	4	2	2	0	243	9	0	2.22	.925
2014	Latvia	OLY	8th	2	0	2	0	119	7	0	3.50	.919
2016	Latvia	OGQ	DNQ	2	1	0	0	88	3	0	2.04	.923
2018	Latvia	WC	8th	2	0	1	1	121	10	0	4.97	.839
2019	Latvia	WC	10th	4	2	1	0	179	6	1	2.01	.909
2024	Latvia	WC	9th	4	2	2	0	207	11	0	3.19	.906
2024	Latvia	OGQ	Q	3	3	0	0	180	5	0	1.67	.914
2025	Latvia	WC	10th	6	3	3	0	358	17	0	2.85	.876
2026	Latvia	WC	6th	7	4	3	0	417	10	2	1.44	.946
Junior totals				12	2	8	0	678	54	0	5.78	.864
Senior totals				30	15	12	1	1,705	67	2	2.56	.915

== Awards and honours ==
Award	Year	Ref
MHL
MHL All-Star Game	2011	
International
World Championship Top 3 Player on Team	2013, 2024, 2025	
AHL
AHL All-Star Game	2016	
DEL
Goaltender of the year	2024, 2025	

- First and only player to play in the ECHL, AHL, NHL, World Championships, and Olympic Games in a single season (2013-14)
