= Thomas Larkin (ice hockey) =

Italian ice hockey player (born 1990)

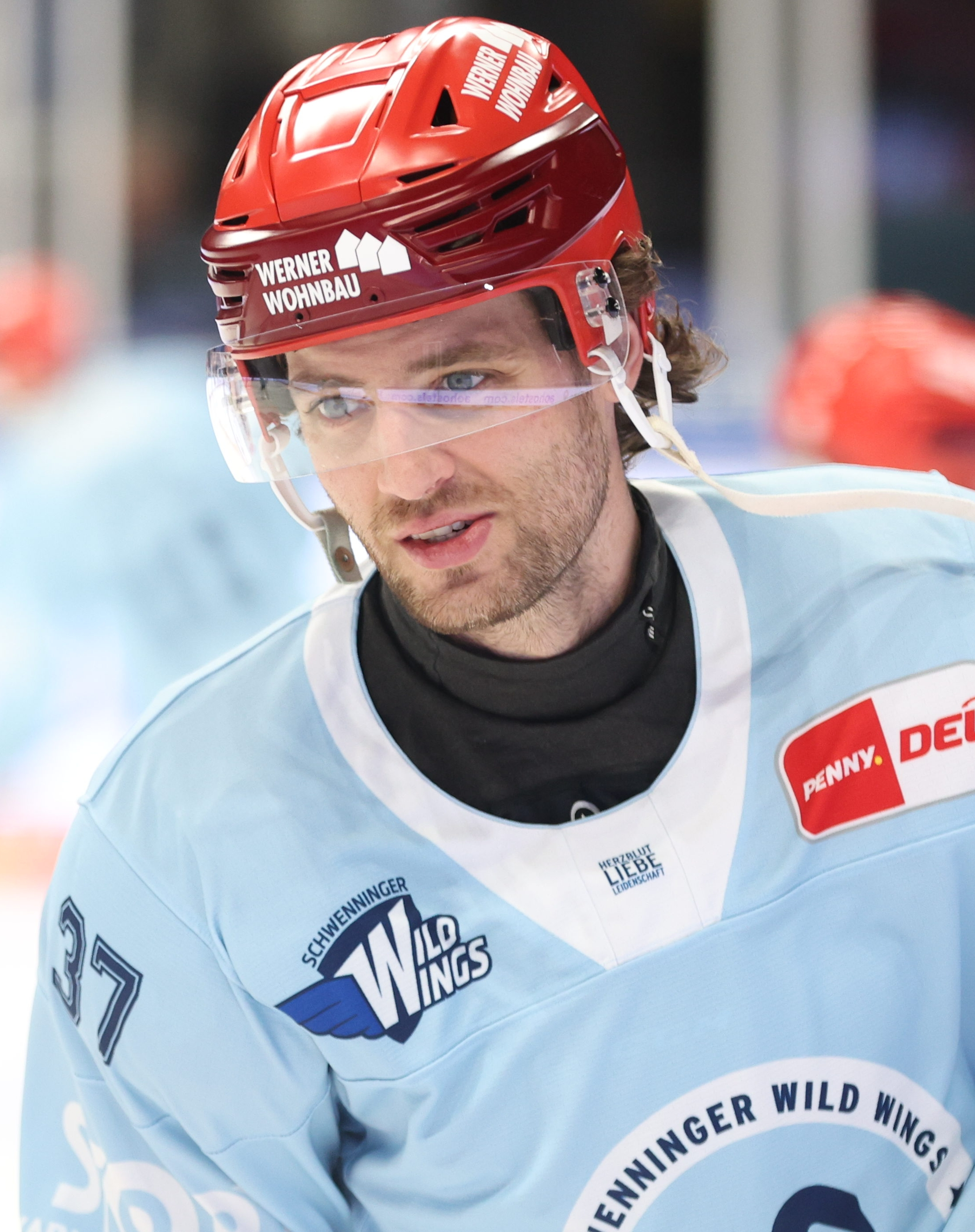
- Larkin in 2024
- Born: 31 December 1990 (age 35) London, England, UK
- Height: 6 ft 5 in (196 cm)
- Weight: 220 lb (100 kg; 15 st 10 lb)
- Position: Defence
- Shoots: Right
- DEL team Former teams: Schwenninger Wild Wings; Springfield Falcons; Medveščak Zagreb; Adler Mannheim
- National team: Italy
- NHL draft: 137th overall, 2009; Columbus Blue Jackets
- Playing career: 2011–present

Thomas William Larkin (born 31 December 1990) is a British-born Italian professional ice hockey player who is a defenceman for the Schwenninger Wild Wings of the Deutsche Eishockey Liga (DEL). Larkin was selected by the Columbus Blue Jackets in the 5th round (137th overall) of the 2009 NHL entry draft, the first Italian-trained player ever selected in the NHL Entry Draft. Larkin attended Phillips Exeter Academy and then spent four years at Colgate University, where he played for the Raiders ice hockey team, and served as the team's co-captain during his senior season. Internationally, Larkin has represented Italy at the world championships.

== Playing career ==
In Larkin's final season at Phillips Exeter Academy he set a school record for most goals and assists by a defenceman in one season (14 and 38, respectively). He also had the school record for most career points by a defenceman (82). Prior to the 2009 NHL entry draft Larkin was ranked 87th overall amongst North American skaters by the NHL Central Scouting Bureau. This was an improvement of 59 spots from his place three months prior. He was selected in the fifth round, 137th overall by the Columbus Blue Jackets, becoming the first Italian-trained player ever chosen in the NHL Entry Draft.

Larkin had an impressive freshman season at Colgate University, playing in 33 games and registering 19 points with 32 minutes in penalties, but his production fell to just 11 points in 41 games played during his sophomore 2010–11 season. Upon completion of his collegiate career, on 5 July 2013, Larkin was signed to a two-year entry-level contract by the Columbus Blue Jackets.

At the conclusion of his entry-level contract with the Blue Jackets, Larkin was not tendered a new offer and was released to free agency. On 22 August 2015, Larkin signed his first professional European contract, agreeing to a one-year contract with Croatian KHL participants Medveščak Zagreb. He eventually played for the Zagreb team until 16 February 2017 and then was picked up by Adler Mannheim of the German DEL.

On 7 November 2017, Larkin hit Daniel Paille during a match between Swedish club Brynas and Adler Mannheim, resulting in Paille leaving with a severe concussion. Two days after the incident, Larkin apologized on Twitter, writing:

"It wasn’t my intention to cause an injury. I wanted to put pressure on the puck carrier behind the net. I would like to apologize to Daniel Paille and I hope he is back playing soon."

A year later on 29 November 2018, Swedish prosecutor Joakim Johansson indicated that Larkin would be charged with assault for blindsiding Paille. Larkin was later acquitted of both the criminal charges and the civil case. Paille was ordered to pay Larkin's legal costs as well as those of Adler Mannheim, which totalled just over $400,000 USD.

In the 2018-19 campaign, Larkin captured the German championship with Mannheim, scoring the game winner in overtime of game five in the finals against Munich.

Larkin played seven seasons with Adler Mannheim before leaving as a free agent to sign a one-year contract with Schwenninger Wild Wings of the DEL on 16 April 2023.

== International play ==
Larkin competed at the 2011 IIHF World Championship Division I, 2012 IIHF World Championship and 2014 IIHF World Championship as a member of the Italy national ice hockey team.

Larkin was selected to play for the Italian men's national team at the 2026 Winter Olympics as the host nation.

== Personal life ==
Larkin was born in London but grew up in Cocquio-Trevisago, Italy. His father is from Boston, Massachusetts while his mother is from Milan, Italy. When Larkin was four his family moved to Italy; it was there, at age 7, that he first began to play hockey, joining his older brother at the HC Varese's rink. Larkin speaks five languages (English, Italian, French, Spanish and German).

== Career statistics ==
=== Regular season and playoffs ===
			Regular season					Playoffs
Season	Team	League	GP	G	A	Pts	PIM	GP	G	A	Pts	PIM
2006–07	Phillips Exeter Academy	HS-Prep	28	1	7	8	5	—	—	—	—	—
2006–07	HC Varese	ITA U19	3	5	1	6	10	—	—	—	—	—
2007–08	Phillips Exeter Academy	HS-Prep	29	6	15	21	18	—	—	—	—	—
2007–08	HC Varese	ITA U19	1	0	0	0	0	1	0	0	0	2
2008–09	Phillips Exeter Academy	HS-Prep	35	14	38	52	30	—	—	—	—	—
2008–09	Boston Little Bruins	18U AAA	18	1	1	2	10	—	—	—	—	—
2009–10	Colgate University	ECAC	33	3	16	19	32	—	—	—	—	—
2010–11	Colgate University	ECAC	41	5	6	11	41	—	—	—	—	—
2011–12	Colgate University	ECAC	37	4	10	14	48	—	—	—	—	—
2012–13	Colgate University	ECAC	36	3	11	14	55	—	—	—	—	—
2012–13	Springfield Falcons	AHL	7	1	0	1	2	—	—	—	—	—
2013–14	Evansville IceMen	ECHL	33	3	17	20	60	—	—	—	—	—
2013–14	Springfield Falcons	AHL	19	0	2	2	48	1	0	0	0	0
2014–15	Springfield Falcons	AHL	62	5	12	17	89	—	—	—	—	—
2015–16	KHL Medveščak Zagreb	KHL	34	2	3	5	56	—	—	—	—	—
2016–17	KHL Medveščak Zagreb	KHL	58	2	3	5	78	—	—	—	—	—
2016–17	Adler Mannheim	DEL	5	0	1	1	4	7	0	1	1	10
2017–18	Adler Mannheim	DEL	51	5	13	18	28	10	2	0	2	10
2018–19	Adler Mannheim	DEL	33	6	11	17	30	14	1	2	3	22
2019–20	Adler Mannheim	DEL	29	1	8	9	36	—	—	—	—	—
2020–21	Adler Mannheim	DEL	35	4	17	21	24	6	1	0	1	4
2021–22	Adler Mannheim	DEL	50	6	10	16	39	9	0	0	0	4
2022–23	Adler Mannheim	DEL	49	2	11	13	26	12	1	0	1	14
2023–24	Schwenninger Wild Wings	DEL	41	4	15	19	26	7	1	4	5	20
2024–25	Schwenninger Wild Wings	DEL	42	2	10	12	27	—	—	—	—	—
AHL totals			88	6	14	20	139	1	0	0	0	0
KHL totals			92	4	6	10	134	—	—	—	—	—
DEL totals			335	30	96	126	240	65	6	7	13	84

=== International ===
Year	Team	Event	Result	GP	G	A	Pts	PIM
2007	Italy	WJC18 D1	17th	4	1	2	3	6
2008	Italy	WJC18 D1	16th	5	3	0	3	20
2011	Italy	WC D1	18th	4	1	0	1	0
2012	Italy	WC	15th	7	0	1	1	4
2014	Italy	WC	15th	7	0	1	1	4
2016	Italy	OGQ	DNQ	6	0	1	1	0
2016	Italy	WC D1A	17th	5	1	1	2	10
2017	Italy	WC	16th	7	0	0	0	4
2018	Italy	WC D1A	18th	5	2	0	2	2
2021	Italy	OGQ	DNQ	3	0	0	0	0
2023	Italy	WC D1A	19th	5	5	1	6	2
2024	Italy	WC D1A	19th	5	1	3	4	0
2025	Italy	WC D1A	18th	4	0	0	0	4
2026	Italy	OG	12th	4	0	2	2	6
Junior totals				9	4	2	6	26
Senior totals				62	10	10	20	36

== Awards and honors ==
Award	Year
College
All-ECAC Third Team	2011–12
DEL
Champion (Adler Mannheim)	2019
