= Joacim Eriksson =

Swedish ice hockey player

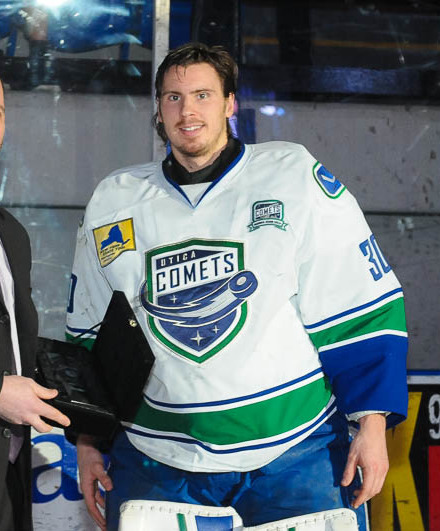
- Eriksson with the Utica Comets in 2014
- Born: April 9, 1990 (age 36) Hedesunda, Sweden
- Height: 6 ft 2 in (188 cm)
- Weight: 196 lb (89 kg; 14 st 0 lb)
- Position: Goaltender
- Catches: Right
- DEL team Former teams: Schwenninger Wild Wings; Skellefteå AIK; Vancouver Canucks; Dinamo Riga; Växjö Lakers; Djurgårdens IF; Brynäs IF
- National team: Sweden
- NHL draft: 196th overall, 2008; Philadelphia Flyers
- Playing career: 2008–present

Joacim Eriksson (born April 9, 1990) is a Swedish professional ice hockey goaltender currently playing with Schwenninger Wild Wings of the Deutsche Eishockey Liga (DEL). Eriksson played several years in the Swedish junior leagues, making his professional debut in 2008. He was subsequently drafted by the Philadelphia Flyers in the 2008 NHL entry draft, though never signed with the team. In 2013 Eriksson signed with the Vancouver Canucks and joined their minor league affiliate in the American Hockey League. He appeared in one game for the Canucks in 2014 and returned to Sweden after two years in North America. Internationally Eriksson played for Sweden at both the under-18 and senior level, winning a gold medal at the 2007 Ivan Hlinka Memorial Tournament and a bronze at the 2014 World Championships.

== Playing career ==
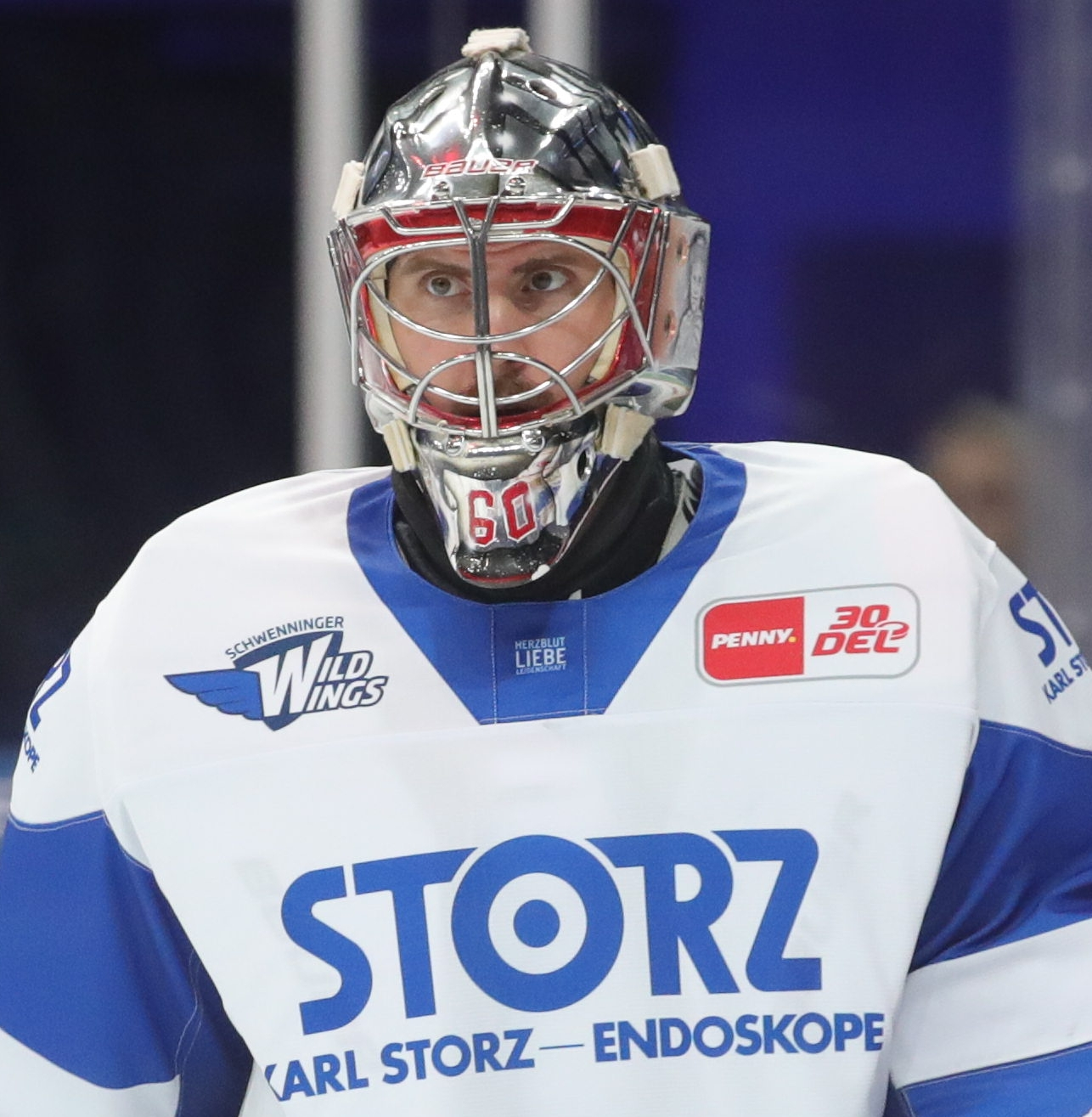
Eriksson playing for Schwenninger Wild Wings (2023)

Eriksson started his junior career in Valbo before he moved on to the more prestigious Brynäs IF in his hometown of Gävle in 2007. He was born and raised in the village Hedesunda, where he played his first game as a child. He was drafted in the 7th round of the 2008 NHL entry draft at 196th overall by the Philadelphia Flyers. However the Flyers did not sign him by June 1, 2012, they lost the rights to him.

Unable to find significant playing time behind Jacob Markström after two years of junior play and after setting league-high marks for Brynäs' J20 SuperElit team, Eriksson moved west to Leksands IF of the second-tier Allsvenskan. The move paid off, as Eriksson played in 38 games in the 2009–10 season with a 2.40 goals against average and a .926 save percentage. This led Leksand to play in the Kvalserien for promotion to the Elitserien for the 2010–11 season.

From 2010 to 2013, Eriksson played for SHL side Skellefteå AIK. He won the Swedish championship with the club in 2013 and reached the SHL finals in 2011 and 2012.

On June 15, 2013, Eriksson signed a two-year professional contract with the Vancouver Canucks. Eriksson played in his first career NHL regular season game for the Canucks on January 15, 2014, against the Anaheim Ducks, coming in relief of starter Eddie Läck in a 9–1 loss. He mostly saw action for the Canucks' affiliate, the Utica Comets, in the American Hockey League.

On June 23, 2015, Eriksson agreed to terms with Dinamo Riga of the KHL. He made 34 appearances for Riga with a GAA of 2.42 and a SVS% of .919. After a single season in Latvia with Riga, he penned a deal with the Växjö Lakers of the Swedish Hockey League in April 2016.

== International play ==
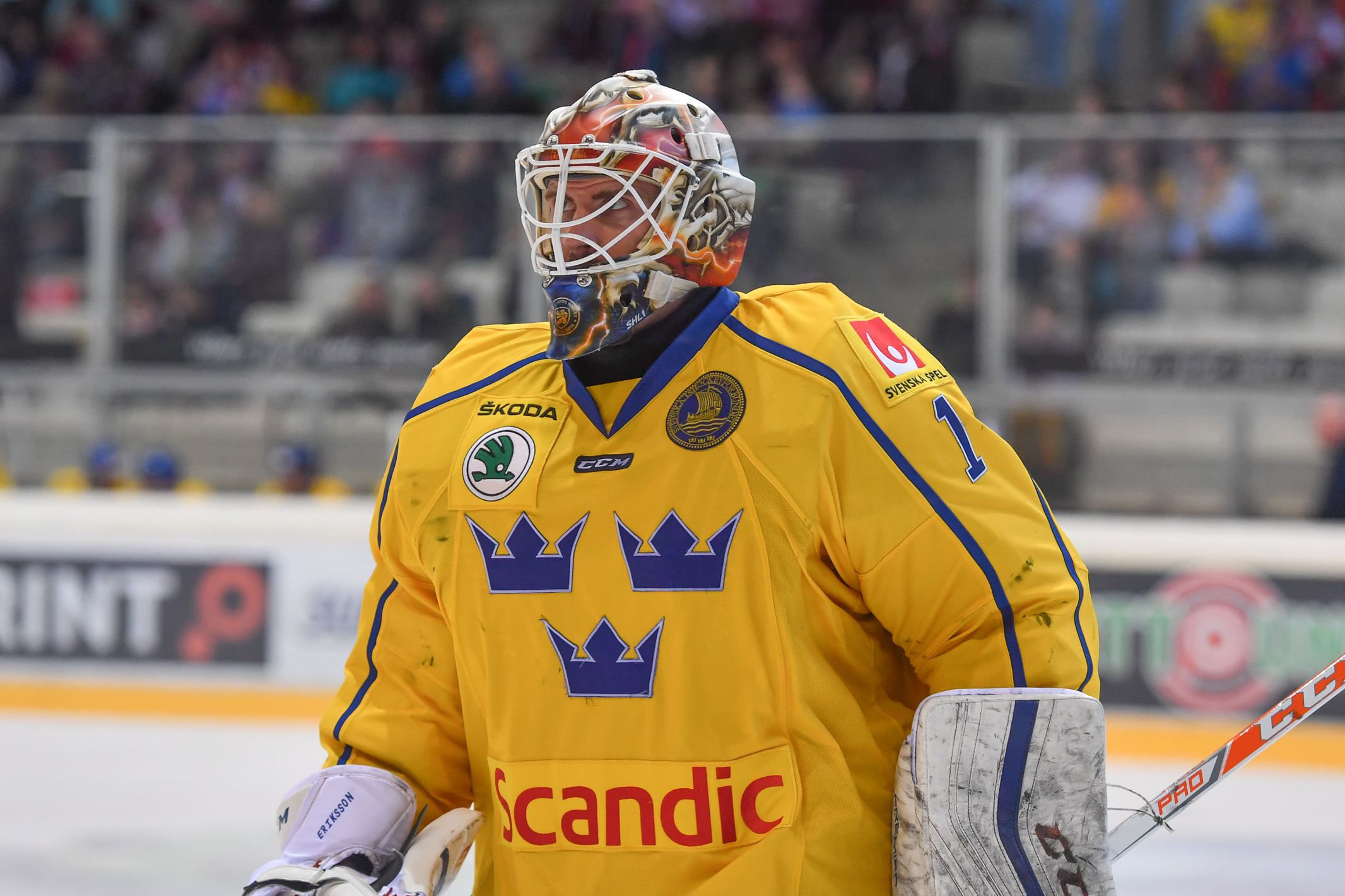
- Eriksson with Sweden in 2017.

Medal record

Representing Sweden

Ice hockey

World Championships
Bronze medal – third place	2014 Minsk	

Ivan Hlinka Memorial Tournament
Gold medal – first place	2007 Slovakia	

Eriksson's first big international exposure came at the 2007 Ivan Hlinka Memorial Tournament where he helped Sweden win its first and only gold medal in the tournament.

Eriksson was named to the 2008 IIHF World U18 Championships, playing for Sweden. He dressed for every game in the tournament but did not play behind Jacob Markström, as Sweden finished fourth.

He won bronze at the 2014 World Championships with the Swedish national team, making eight appearances during the tournament.

== Career statistics ==
=== Regular season and playoffs ===
			Regular season									Playoffs
Season	Team	League	GP	W	L	T	MIN	GA	SO	GAA	SV%	GP	W	L	MIN	GA	SO	GAA	SV%
2006–07	Valbo AIF	J20	18	—	—	—	—	55	—	3.08	.898	—	—	—	—	—	—	—	—
2006–07	Valbo AIF	Div.1	1	—	—	—	—	2	0	3.51	.890	—	—	—	—	—	—	—	—
2007–08	Brynäs IF	J18	9	—	—	—	—	21	2	2.31	.908	5	—	—	7	2	0	1.42	.940
2007–08	Brynäs IF	J20	16	—	—	—	—	53	0	3.31	.875	7	—	—	—	13	1	1.83	.942
2007–08	Valbo AIF	Div.1	2	—	—	—	—	8	—	3.91	.907	—	—	—	—	—	—	—	—
2008–09	Brynäs IF	J20	33	—	—	—	1962	65	6	1.99	.930	7	—	—	468	19	0	2.43	.922
2009–10	Leksands IF	J20	1	—	—	—	60	0	1	0.00	1.000	—	—	—	—	—	—	—	—
2009–10	Leksands IF	Allsv	38	23	15	0	2274	89	8	2.35	.928	10	6	4	603	24	0	2.39	.923
2010–11	Skellefteå AIK	J20	2	—	—	—	119	7	0	3.54	.865	—	—	—	—	—	—	—	—
2010–11	Skellefteå AIK	SEL	17	7	9	0	939	40	1	2.56	.909	—	—	—	—	—	—	—	—
2011–12	Skellefteå AIK	SEL	33	21	12	0	2016	61	3	1.82	.935	19	10	9	1200	44	1	2.20	.918
2012–13	Skellefteå AIK	SEL	30	21	9	0	1726	48	5	1.67	.931	10	10	0	623	11	3	1.06	.952
2013–14	Utica Comets	AHL	52	24	24	2	3009	131	5	2.61	.911	—	—	—	—	—	—	—	—
2013–14	Vancouver Canucks	NHL	1	0	0	0	36	6	0	9.99	.806	—	—	—	—	—	—	—	—
2014–15	Utica Comets	AHL	41	22	10	7	2371	100	0	2.53	.908	2	0	0	31	0	0	0.00	1.000
2015–16	Dinamo Riga	KHL	34	9	17	0	1935	78	2	2.42	.919	—	—	—	—	—	—	—	—
2016–17	Växjö Lakers	SHL	30	20	10	0	1788	64	2	2.15	.913	5	2	3	305	12	1	2.36	.918
2017–18	Djurgården	SHL	24	14	8	0	1343	51	2	2.28	.918	1	1	0	60	2	0	2.00	.913
2018–19	Brynäs IF	SHL	22	6	13	0	1099	49	1	2.68	.916	—	—	—	—	—	—	—	—
2018–19	Almtuna IS	Allsv	1	1	0	0	60	0	1	0.00	1.000	—	—	—	—	—	—	—	—
2019–20	Brynäs IF	SHL	20	7	11	0	1131	64	0	3.39	.879	—	—	—	—	—	—	—	—
2020–21	Schwenninger Wild Wings	DEL	30	18	12	0	1812	74	2	2.45	.930	—	—	—	—	—	—	—	—
2021–22	Schwenninger Wild Wings	DEL	40	17	22	0	2372	104	2	2.63	.921	—	—	—	—	—	—	—	—
2022–23	Schwenninger Wild Wings	DEL	45	20	25	0	2710	110	4	2.44	.924	—	—	—	—	—	—	—	—
2023–24	Schwenninger Wild Wings	DEL	41	25	16	0	2429	95	3	2.35	.918	7	3	4	412	19	1	2.76	.905
2024–25	Schwenninger Wild Wings	DEL	40	20	20	0	2375	107	2	2.70	.902	3	1	2	177	8	0	2.71	.911
NHL totals			1	0	0	0	39	6	0	9.99	.806	—	—	—	—	—	—	—	—

=== International ===
Year	Team	Event	GP	W	L	OT	MIN	GA	SO	GAA	SV%
2007	Sweden	IH18	1	1	0	0	60	2	0	2.00	.913
2014	Sweden	WC	1	1	0	0	60	1	0	1.00	.909
Junior totals			1	1	0	0	60	2	0	2.00	.913
Senior totals			1	1	0	0	60	1	0	1.00	.909

== Awards ==
- 2007–08 J20 SuperElit SM-silver Medal
- 2007–08 U18 World Cup Ivan Hlinka Memorial Tournament Champion
- 2008–09 Best GAA in the J20 SuperElit regular season with 1.99
- 2008–09 Best save percentage in the J20 SuperElit regular season with .930
- 2008–09 Best GAA in the J20 SuperElit playoffs with 1.83
- 2008–09 Best save percentage in the J20 SuperElit playoffs with .938
- 2008–09 J20 SuperElit Champion
- 2012–13 SHL Champion
- 2014 Bronze medal World Championships
