= Kyle Platzer =

Canadian ice hockey player

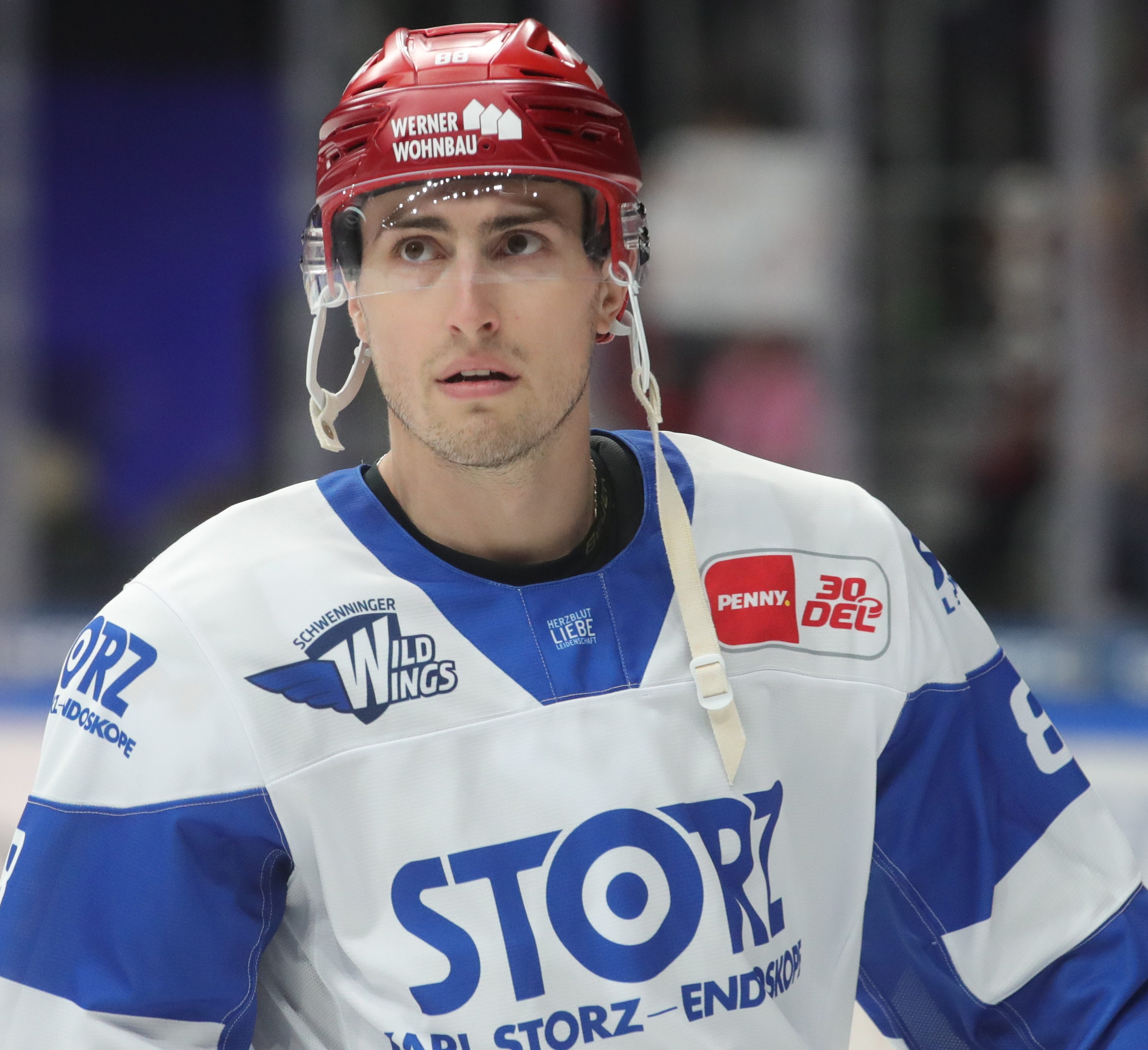
- Platzer with the Schwenninger Wild Wings in 2023
- Born: March 4, 1995 (age 31) Waterloo, Ontario, Canada
- Height: 6 ft 0 in (183 cm)
- Weight: 181 lb (82 kg; 12 st 13 lb)
- Position: Forward
- Shoots: Right
- DEL team Former teams: Schwenninger Wild Wings; Oklahoma City Barons; Bakersfield Condors; KooKoo; Tappara; JYP Jyväskylä
- NHL draft: 96th overall, 2013; Edmonton Oilers
- Playing career: 2015–present

Kyle Platzer (born March 4, 1995) is a Canadian professional ice hockey forward currently playing with Schwenninger Wild Wings in the Deutsche Eishockey Liga (DEL). He was drafted by the Edmonton Oilers in the fourth-round, 96th overall, of the 2013 NHL entry draft.

== Playing career ==
Platzer played major junior hockey with the London Knights and the Owen Sound Attack in the Ontario Hockey League (OHL) and was selected by the Oilers in the 2013 NHL entry draft, 96th overall. He was later signed to a three-year, entry-level contract with the Oilers on April 5, 2015.

Platzer made his professional debut in the American Hockey League (AHL), appearing with the Oilers affiliates, the Oklahoma City Barons and the Bakersfield Condors.

A free agent following his entry-level contract with the Oilers, Platzer left North America after four seasons in the minor leagues, and signed a contract with top tier Finnish outfit, KooKoo of the Liiga on July 10, 2019. Establishing himself with KooKoo, Platzer enjoyed two productive seasons in the Liiga, collecting 70 points in 108 games.

On May 19, 2021, Platzer as a free agent joined fellow Finnish club, Tappara, on a one-year deal for the 2021–22 season.

== Career statistics ==
			Regular season					Playoffs
Season	Team	League	GP	G	A	Pts	PIM	GP	G	A	Pts	PIM
2011–12	Waterloo Siskins	GOJHL	50	31	24	55	70	6	4	6	10	6
2011–12	London Knights	OHL	4	0	1	1	0	—	—	—	—	—
2012–13	London Knights	OHL	65	5	17	22	15	21	2	4	6	8
2013–14	London Knights	OHL	39	9	8	17	14	—	—	—	—	—
2013–14	Owen Sound Attack	OHL	27	13	6	19	12	5	1	2	3	6
2014–15	Owen Sound Attack	OHL	68	34	47	81	46	5	1	4	5	4
2014–15	Oklahoma City Barons	AHL	4	2	1	3	0	3	0	0	0	0
2015–16	Bakersfield Condors	AHL	48	6	11	17	24	—	—	—	—	—
2016–17	Bakersfield Condors	AHL	51	1	7	8	14	—	—	—	—	—
2017–18	Wichita Thunder	ECHL	20	8	14	22	6	—	—	—	—	—
2017–18	Bakersfield Condors	AHL	44	8	7	15	12	—	—	—	—	—
2018–19	Florida Everblades	ECHL	58	24	33	57	20	16	1	4	5	2
2019–20	KooKoo	Liiga	56	12	21	33	8	—	—	—	—	—
2020–21	KooKoo	Liiga	52	9	28	37	14	2	0	0	0	0
2021–22	Tappara	Liiga	55	11	15	26	12	15	1	1	2	0
2022–23	JYP	Liiga	60	7	29	36	22	—	—	—	—	—
2023–24	Schwenninger Wild Wings	DEL	52	17	27	44	24	7	2	6	8	2
2024–25	Schwenninger Wild Wings	DEL	51	6	22	28	14	3	0	2	2	2
Liiga totals			223	39	93	132	56	17	1	1	2	0
