= Helios Arena =

Arena in Villingen-Schwenningen, Germany

Coordinates: 48.0508°N 8.5289°E

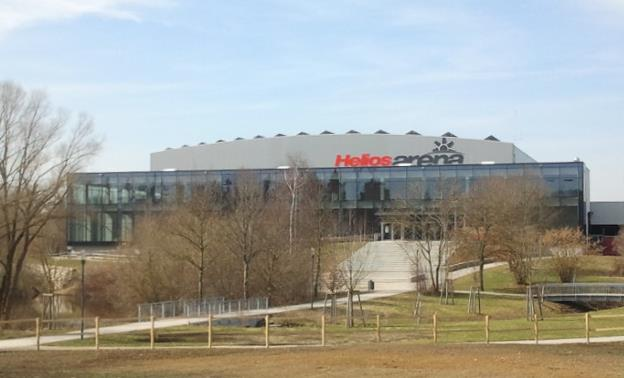
- Interactive map of Helios Arena
- Full name: Helios Arena
- Former names: Eisstadion am Bauchenberg
- Location: Villingen-Schwenningen, Germany
- Capacity: 5,135

Construction
- Opened: 1976
- Expanded: 2007

Tenant
- Schwenninger Wild Wings

Helios Arena, originally known as Eisstadion am Bauchenberg, is an arena in Villingen-Schwenningen, Germany. It is primarily used for ice hockey, and is the home to the Schwenninger Wild Wings of the DEL. It opened in 1976 and holds 5,135 spectators.
