= Schwenninger Wild Wings =

- City: Villingen-Schwenningen
- League: DEL
- Founded: 1904
- Home arena: Helios Arena (capacity: 5,135)
- Colors: Dark blue, white
- Owners: Thomas Burger, Michael Werner
- General manager: Stefan Wagner
- Head coach: Steve Walker
- Captain: Thomas Larkin
- Website: schwenninger-wildwings.de

Franchise history
- 1904–1950: SEC Schwenningen
- 1950–1994: Schwenninger ERC
- 1994–2013: SERC Wild Wings
- 2013—: Schwenninger Wild Wings

The Schwenninger Wild Wings are a professional German ice hockey team from Villingen-Schwenningen in Baden-Wuerttemberg that was founded on 20 July 1904 and currently plays in the Deutsche Eishockey Liga (DEL). The greatest success of the association was to reach the play-off semi-finals of the first Bundesliga in 1990. In 1994 the Wild Wings were a founding member of the Deutsche Eishockey Liga.

The Wild Wings play their home games in Helios Arena, a 6,193-seater stadium, and the club's colors are blue and white. The home club of the team is the Schwenningen ice and roller sports club 04 eV (german: Schwenninger Eis- und Rollsportclub 04 eV), which also competes in a junior and senior division and owns a figure skating and inline hockey department. Among the most famous players to have played at Schweninngen include the former captain of the German national ice hockey team Marcel Goc, the Seidenberg brothers, Dennis and Yannic, and former DEL record player Andreas Renz.

== History ==
Schwenningen originally competed in the Deutsche Eishockey Liga (DEL) from 1994–95 until the 2002–03 season when they lost their license due to insolvency proceedings. From 2003 until 2013, they competed in the 2nd Bundesliga, where they were runner-up in the 2010, 2011 and 2013 seasons.

After 10 seasons in absentia from the DEL, the Wild Wings were returned to Germany's top league when they purchased the DEL license of the financially stricken Hannover Scorpions on 14 June 2013. They began competing from the 2013–14 season.

== Season records ==
Season	Games	Won	Lost	Tie	OTL	SOL	Points	Goals for	Goals against	Rank	Playoffs
1994–95	44	18	19	7	–	–	45	174	148	9	Lost in quarterfinals
1995–96	50	30	14	6	–	–	68	214	150	5	Lost in preliminary round
1996–97	48	23	19	1	5	–	52	200	191	10	No playoffs
1997–98	44	19	17	5	3	–	46	157	148	9	Lost in preliminary round
1998–99	52	23	22	–	3	4	72	195	217	10	No playoffs
1999–00	56	23	24	–	0	9	73	160	185	11	No playoffs
2000–01	60	24	28	–	0	8	76	174	207	12	No playoffs
2001–02	60	20	30	–	0	10	68	134	183	16	No playoffs
2002–03	52	10	31	–	0	11	35	99	184	14	No playoffs
2013–14	52	12	30	–	2	3	51	136	190	14	No playoffs
2014–15	52	15	36	–	0	1	43	106	179	14	No playoffs
2015–16	52	15	31	–	1	1	55	143	179	14	No playoffs
2016–17	52	21	27	–	2	2	55	122	156	12	No playoffs
2017–18	52	26	23	–	2	1	74	123	130	10	Lost in preliminary round
2018–19	52	18	31	–	1	2	49	111	169	14	No playoffs
2019–20	52	14	32	–	3	3	45	119	173	14	Cancelled due to the COVID-19 pandemic.
2020–21	38	19	17	–	2	0	54	111	109	10	No playoffs
2021–22	55	21	27	–	3	4	64	136	165	14	No playoffs
2022–23	56	24	24	–	4	4	75	144	151	12	No playoffs
2023–24	52	24	20	–	1	2	85	159	145	6	Lost in quarterfinals
2024–25	52	25	21	–	2	4	71	160	155	9	Lost in pre-playoffs
2025–26	52	24	25	–	3	0	72	147	157	9	Lost in quarterfinals

== Players ==
=== Current roster ===
Updated 29 March 2025.

No.	Nat	Player	Pos	S/G	Age	Acquired	Birthplace
64	(Germany)	Boaz Bassen	C	L	26	2018	Villingen-Schwenningen, Germany
1	(United States)	Michael Bitzer	G	L	32	2024	Moorhead, Minnesota, United States
7	(Germany)	Dominik Bittner	D	R	33	2025	Weilheim, Germany
46	(Sweden)	Eric Martinsson	D	L	33	2025	Klippan, Sweden
16	(Poland)	Arkadiusz Dziambor	D	L	24	2023	Pyskowice, Poland
60	(Sweden)	Joacim Eriksson	G	R	36	2020	Hedesunda, Sweden
9	(Germany)	Philip Feist	LW	L	22	2021	Duisburg, Germany
94	(Germany)	Phil Hungerecker	LW	L	31	2022	Lüneburg, Germany
10	(Germany)	Mirko Höfflin	LW	L	33	2024	Freiburg, Germany
47	(Belarus)	Alexander Karachun	LW	L	31	2021	Gdańsk, Poland
37	(Italy)	Thomas Larkin (C)	D	R	35	2023	London, England
40	(Germany)	Baran Bruno Cicek	G	L	19	2024	Frankfurt, Germany
54	(United States)	Ben Marshall	D	L	33	2023	St. Paul, Minnesota, United States
88	(Canada)	Kyle Platzer (A)	C	R	31	2023	Waterloo, Ontario, Canada
72	(Germany)	Niklas Hübner	D	L	22	2025	Ingolstadt, Germany
33	(Finland)	Christopher Gibson	G	L	33	2025	Karkkila, Finland
61	(Germany)	Niclas Hempel	D	L	18	2025	Freiburg, Germany
90	(Canada)	Tylor Spink	C	R	33	2020	Williamstown, Ontario, Canada
96	(Canada)	Tyson Spink	LW	L	33	2020	Williamstown, Ontario, Canada
53	(Italy)	Alex Trivellato (A)	D	L	33	2022	Bolzano, Italy
93	(Germany)	Sebastian Uvira	LW	L	33	2022	Freiburg, Germany
13	(Denmark)	Felix Maegaard Scheel	LW	L	33	2025	Virum, Denmark
11	(United States)	Danny O'Regan	C	R	32	2025	Berlin, Germany
14	(Canada)	Jordan Szwarz	RW	R	34	2025	Burlington, Ontario, Canada
19	(Germany)	Håkon Frederik Hänelt	LW	L	22	2025	Berlin, Germany
26	(United States)	Tim Gettinger	LW	L	28	2025	Cleveland, Ohio, United States
78	(United States)	Will Weber	D	L	37	2020	Gaylord, Michigan, United States
