= Olaf Eller =

Danish ice hockey coach

- Born: June 13, 1960 (age 65) Denmark
- Height: 6 ft 2 in (188 cm)
- Weight: 190 lb (86 kg; 13 st 8 lb)
- Position: Right wing
- Caught: Right
- Played for: AL-Bank Ligaen; Rødovre Mighty Bulls; Nordsjælland Cobras
- National team: Denmark
- NHL draft: Undrafted
- Playing career: 1976–1994

Olaf Eller (born June 13, 1960) is a Danish ice hockey coach. He is currently the head coach of Denmark men's national junior ice hockey team. His son is Lars Eller, who was drafted 13th overall to the St. Louis Blues in 2007 and currently plays for the Ottawa Senators. His son Mads Eller won the Memorial Cup with the Edmonton Oil Kings of the Western Hockey League, and currently plays for the Gentofte Stars in the Danish Metal Ligaen.

== Career statistics ==
			Regular season					Playoffs
Season	Team	League	GP	G	A	Pts	PIM	GP	G	A	Pts	PIM
1976–77	Rødovre SIK	Denmark	25	2	1	3	20	—	—	—	—	—
1977–78	Rødovre SIK	Denmark	28	9	4	13	6	—	—	—	—	—
1978–79	Rødovre SIK	Denmark	28	6	7	13	12	—	—	—	—	—
1979–80	Rødovre SIK	Denmark	28	8	14	22	23	—	—	—	—	—
1980–81	Rødovre SIK	Denmark	27	13	14	27	22	—	—	—	—	—
1981–82	Rødovre SIK	Denmark	25	7	11	18	20	—	—	—	—	—
1982–83	Rødovre SIK	Denmark	33	10	13	23	20	—	—	—	—	—
1983–84	Rødovre SIK	Denmark	33	7	23	30	22	—	—	—	—	—
1984–85	Rødovre SIK	Denmark	32	6	8	14	14	—	—	—	—	—
1985–86	Rødovre SIK	Denmark	30	11	12	23	36	—	—	—	—	—
1986–87	Rødovre SIK	Denmark	28	8	7	15	22	—	—	—	—	—
1987–88	Rødovre SIK	Denmark	23	7	7	14	23	—	—	—	—	—
1988–89	Rødovre SIK	Denmark	—	—	—	—	—	—	—	—	—	—
1989–90	Rødovre SIK	Denmark	31	7	16	23	8	—	—	—	—	—
1990–91	Rungsted Cobras	Denmark	—	—	—	—	—	—	—	—	—	—
1991–92	Rungsted Cobras	Denmark2	—	—	—	—	—	—	—	—	—	—
1992–93	Rungsted Cobras	Denmark	33	8	7	15	60	—	—	—	—	—
1993–94	Rungsted Cobras	Denmark	3	0	0	0	0	—	—	—	—	—
Denmark totals			407	109	144	253	308	—	—	—	—	—
