= 1972–73 Danish 1. division season =

Danish ice hockey season

The 1972–73 Danish 1. division season was the 16th season of ice hockey in Denmark. Ten teams participated in the league, and Herning IK won the championship. IK Aalborg was relegated.

== Regular season ==
	Club	GP	W	T	L	GF	GA	Pts
1.	Herning IK	18	15	2	1	114	48	32
2.	KSF Copenhagen	18	15	1	2	144	55	31
3.	Esbjerg IK	18	12	2	4	94	42	26
4.	Gladsaxe SF	18	10	2	6	103	68	22
5.	AaB Ishockey	18	9	3	6	93	73	21
6.	Vojens IK	18	6	3	9	93	88	15
7.	Rungsted IK	18	5	3	10	61	87	13
8.	Rødovre Mighty Bulls	18	5	3	10	64	90	13
9.	Hellerup IK	18	2	2	14	50	113	6
10.	IK Aalborg	18	0	1	17	39	191	1
