= 1974–75 Danish 1. division season =

Danish ice hockey season

The 1974–75 Danish 1. division season was the 18th season of ice hockey in Denmark. Ten teams participated in the league, and Gladsaxe SF won the championship. Brøndby was relegated.

== First round ==
	Club	GP	W	T	L	GF	GA	Pts
1.	Gladsaxe SF	18	15	1	2	120	47	31
2.	Herning IK	18	13	1	4	98	68	27
3.	KSF Copenhagen	18	11	3	4	116	55	25
4.	Rungsted IK	18	10	2	6	80	58	22
5.	Esbjerg IK	18	9	3	6	98	70	21
6.	Rødovre Mighty Bulls	18	9	2	7	88	73	20
7.	Vojens IK	18	8	2	8	103	95	18
8.	AaB Ishockey	18	5	2	11	69	93	12
9.	Hellerup IK	18	1	1	16	39	121	3
10.	Brøndby	18	0	1	17	52	183	1

== Final round ==
The top six teams qualified for the final round, and Gladsaxe SF finished first.
