= 1973–74 Danish 1. division season =

Danish ice hockey season

The 1973–74 Danish 1. division season was the 17th season of ice hockey in Denmark. Ten teams participated in the league, and Gladsaxe SF won the championship. The Frederikshavn White Hawks were relegated.

== First round ==
	Club	GP	W	T	L	GF	GA	Pts
1.	Gladsaxe SF	18	17	0	1	141	40	34
2.	Herning IK	18	14	1	3	141	66	29
3.	KSF Copenhagen	18	11	4	3	155	53	26
4.	Rungsted IK	18	12	2	4	111	76	26
5.	Vojens IK	18	9	3	6	122	98	21
6.	Esbjerg IK	18	8	2	8	91	74	18
7.	Rødovre Mighty Bulls	18	4	2	12	73	109	10
8.	AaB Ishockey	18	4	1	13	61	125	9
9.	Hellerup IK	18	3	0	15	47	113	6
10.	Frederikshavn White Hawks	18	0	1	17	33	221	1

== Final round ==
The top six teams qualified for the final round, and Gladsaxe SF finished first.
