= 1967–68 Danish 1. division season =

Danish ice hockey season

The 1967–68 Danish 1. division season was the 11th season of ice hockey in Denmark. Eight teams participated in the league, and Gladsaxe SF won the championship. Hellerup IK was relegated.

== Regular season ==
	Club	GP	W	T	L	GF	GA	Pts
1.	Gladsaxe SF	14	10	4	0	79	33	24
2.	Esbjerg IK	14	12	0	2	83	28	24
3.	Rungsted IK	14	9	0	5	83	41	18
4.	KSF Copenhagen	14	7	2	5	49	42	16
5.	Rødovre Mighty Bulls	14	7	1	6	69	50	15
6.	Vojens IK	14	4	2	8	64	100	10
7.	Herning IK	14	2	1	11	41	92	5
8.	Hellerup IK	14	0	0	14	24	106	0
