= 1971–72 Danish 1. division season =

Danish ice hockey season

The 1971–72 Danish 1. division season was the 15th season of ice hockey in Denmark. Ten teams participated in the league, and KSF Copenhagen won the championship. Tårnby was relegated.

== Regular season ==
| | Club | GP | W | T | L | GF | GA | Pts |
|---|---|---|---|---|---|---|---|---|
| 1. | KSF Copenhagen | 18 | 16 | 1 | 1 | 128 | 48 | 33 |
| 2. | Esbjerg IK | 18 | 13 | 2 | 3 | 112 | 54 | 28 |
| 3. | Gladsaxe SF | 18 | 12 | 3 | 3 | 95 | 34 | 27 |
| 4. | Vojens IK | 18 | 9 | 2 | 7 | 70 | 76 | 20 |
| 5. | Rødovre Mighty Bulls | 18 | 7 | 3 | 8 | 58 | 78 | 17 |
| 6. | Herning IK | 18 | 8 | 0 | 10 | 85 | 86 | 16 |
| 7. | AaB Ishockey | 18 | 7 | 1 | 10 | 90 | 74 | 15 |
| 8. | Rungsted IK | 18 | 6 | 1 | 11 | 84 | 85 | 13 |
| 9. | Hellerup IK | 18 | 4 | 1 | 13 | 38 | 95 | 9 |
| 10. | Tårnby | 18 | 1 | 0 | 17 | 31 | 161 | 2 |
