= 1970–71 Danish 1. division season =

Danish ice hockey season

The 1970–71 Danish 1. division season was the 14th season of ice hockey in Denmark. Ten teams participated in the league, and Gladsaxe SF won the championship. Hvidovre Ishockey was relegated.

== Regular season ==
	Club	GP	W	T	L	GF	GA	Pts
1.	Gladsaxe SF	18	14	2	2	96	30	30
2.	Rungsted IK	18	12	3	3	105	64	27
3.	Esbjerg IK	18	10	3	5	94	57	23
4.	Vojens IK	18	11	1	6	90	58	23
5.	KSF Copenhagen	18	8	4	6	95	50	20
6.	Rødovre Mighty Bulls	18	7	4	7	81	71	18
7.	AaB Ishockey	18	8	1	9	91	118	17
8.	Herning IK	18	4	3	11	86	113	11
9.	Hellerup IK	18	1	1	16	50	107	3
10.	Hvidovre Ishockey	18	1	1	16	34	154	3
