= 1969–70 Danish 1. division season =

Danish ice hockey season

The 1969–70 Danish 1. division season was the 13th season of ice hockey in Denmark. Eight teams participated in the league, and KSF Copenhagen won the championship.

== Regular season ==
| | Club | GP | W | T | L | GF | GA | Pts |
|---|---|---|---|---|---|---|---|---|
| 1. | KSF Copenhagen | 14 | 12 | 1 | 1 | 83 | 35 | 25 |
| 2. | Gladsaxe SF | 14 | 11 | 1 | 2 | 60 | 25 | 23 |
| 3. | Esbjerg IK | 14 | 9 | 1 | 4 | 81 | 38 | 19 |
| 4. | Rødovre Mighty Bulls | 14 | 8 | 1 | 5 | 59 | 55 | 17 |
| 5. | Rungsted IK | 14 | 4 | 2 | 8 | 41 | 65 | 10 |
| 6. | Vojens IK | 14 | 3 | 1 | 10 | 63 | 80 | 7 |
| 7. | Hellerup IK | 14 | 3 | 1 | 10 | 28 | 64 | 7 |
| 8. | Herning IK | 14 | 2 | 0 | 12 | 36 | 89 | 4 |
