= 1975–76 Danish 1. division season =

Danish ice hockey season

The 1975–76 Danish 1. division season was the 19th season of ice hockey in Denmark. Ten teams participated in the league, and KSF Copenhagen won the championship.

== First round ==
	Club	GP	W	T	L	GF	GA	Pts
1.	KSF Copenhagen	18	14	0	4	94	49	28
2.	Rungsted IK	18	11	4	3	97	49	26
3.	Gladsaxe SF	18	12	1	5	101	55	25
4.	Rødovre Mighty Bulls	18	10	4	4	100	59	24
5.	AaB Ishockey	18	11	1	6	110	70	23
6.	Esbjerg IK	18	9	2	7	86	73	20
7.	Herning IK	18	7	1	10	95	85	15
8.	Vojens IK	18	4	0	14	79	101	8
9.	Hellerup IK	18	3	0	15	36	137	6
10.	Hvidovre Ishockey	18	2	1	15	44	164	5

== Final round ==
The top six teams qualified for the final round, and KSF Copenhagen finished first.
