= 1976–77 Danish 1. division season =

Danish ice hockey season

The 1976–77 Danish 1. division season was the 20th season of ice hockey in Denmark. Ten teams participated in the league, and Herning IK won the championship. Hellerup IK was relegated.

== First round ==
	Club	GP	W	T	L	GF	GA	Pts
1.	Herning IK	18	13	1	4	110	72	27
2.	KSF Copenhagen	18	11	2	5	94	68	24
3.	AaB Ishockey	18	10	2	6	93	55	22
4.	Vojens IK	18	9	3	6	92	67	21
5.	Gladsaxe SF	18	10	1	7	79	64	21
6.	Rødovre Mighty Bulls	18	9	3	6	85	79	21
7.	Esbjerg IK	18	7	3	8	83	67	17
8.	Hvidovre Ishockey	18	6	1	11	64	119	13
9.	Rungsted IK	18	5	2	11	69	76	12
10.	Hellerup IK	18	1	0	17	33	135	2

== Final round ==
The top six teams qualified for the final round, and Herning IK finished first.
