= 1966–67 Danish 1. division season =

Danish ice hockey season

The 1966–67 Danish 1. division season was the 10th season of ice hockey in Denmark. Six teams participated in the league, and Gladsaxe SF won the championship.

== Regular season ==
	Club	GP	W	T	L	GF	GA	Pts
1.	Gladsaxe SF	10	7	3	0	52	25	17
2.	KSF Copenhagen	10	6	1	3	53	33	13
3.	Esbjerg IK	10	5	2	3	64	34	12
4.	Rødovre Mighty Bulls	10	5	1	4	42	39	11
5.	Rungsted IK	10	2	2	6	27	38	6
6.	Vojens IK	10	0	1	9	23	92	1
