= 1999–2000 Codan Ligaen season =

Danish ice hockey league season

The 1999–00 Codan Ligaen season was the 43rd season of ice hockey in Denmark. Ten teams participated in the league, and the Frederikshavn White Hawks won the championship. Gladsaxe SF was relegated to the 1. division.

== First round ==
	Club	GP	W	OTW	T	OTL	L	GF	GA	Pts
1.	Frederikshavn White Hawks	36	27	0	4	1	4	175	90	59
2.	Esbjerg IK	36	24	0	2	2	8	184	105	52
3.	Herning IK	36	22	2	2	0	10	170	99	50
4.	Rungsted IK	36	19	2	3	2	10	140	99	47
5.	Vojens IK	36	20	0	3	0	13	139	107	43
6.	Rødovre Mighty Bulls	36	17	0	3	1	15	153	149	38
7.	AaB Ishockey	36	14	1	2	0	19	135	143	32
8.	Odense Bulldogs	36	13	0	1	0	22	148	151	27
9.	Herlev Eagles	36	5	1	2	0	28	105	205	14
10.	Gladsaxe SF	36	1	0	2	0	33	80	281	4

== Second round ==
=== Group A ===
	Club	GP	W	T	L	GF	GA	Pts
1.	Frederikshavn White Hawks	6	5	1	0	24	15	11
2.	Odense Bulldogs	6	3	0	3	23	21	6
3.	Rungsted IK	6	3	0	3	19	23	6
4.	Vojens IK	6	1	1	4	12	19	4

=== Group B ===
	Club	GP	W	T	L	GF	GA	Pts
1.	Herning IK	6	5	1	0	30	13	11
2.	Esbjerg IK	6	3	0	3	23	21	6
3.	Rødovre Mighty Bulls	6	2	1	3	21	20	5
4.	AaB Ishockey	6	1	0	5	11	31	2

== Playoffs ==
Semi-finals
Frederikshavn White Hawks	3
Esbjerg IK	2
Herning IK	3
Odense Bulldogs	0

Final
Frederikshavn White Hawks	3
Herning IK	2
Third place
Esbjerg IK	2
Odense Bulldogs	0

== Relegation ==
	Club	GP	W	T	L	GF	GA	Pts
1.	Herlev Eagles	7	7	0	0	67	20	14
2.	Gladsaxe SF	8	2	1	5	33	49	5
3.	IC Gentofte	7	1	1	5	22	53	3
