= 1964–65 Danish 1. division season =

Danish ice hockey season

The 1964–65 Danish 1. division season was the eighth season of ice hockey in Denmark. Five teams participated in the league, and KSF Copenhagen won the championship.

== Regular season ==
	Club	GP	W	T	L	GF	GA	Pts
1.	KSF Copenhagen	8	5	1	2	27	16	11
2.	Esbjerg IK	8	5	1	2	34	24	11
3.	Gladsaxe SF	8	5	0	3	27	22	10
4.	Rungsted IK	8	3	1	4	33	29	7
5.	Rødovre Mighty Bulls	8	0	1	7	15	45	1
