= 1992–93 Eliteserien (Denmark) season =

Danish ice hockey league season

The 1992–93 Eliteserien season was the 36th season of the Eliteserien, the top ice hockey league in Denmark. Ten teams participated in the league, and Esbjerg IK won the championship. Gladsaxe SF was relegated to the 1. division.

== First round ==
	Club	GP	W	T	L	GF	GA	Pts
1.	Herning IK	18	14	1	3	139	78	29
2.	Esbjerg IK	18	14	1	3	131	65	29
3.	Rødovre Mighty Bulls	18	11	3	4	106	86	25
4.	Rungsted IK	18	10	3	5	89	65	23
5.	Hellerup IK	18	9	1	8	66	80	19
6.	AaB Ishockey	18	8	2	8	104	95	18
7.	Frederikshavn White Hawks	18	7	0	11	97	115	14
8.	Vojens IK	18	4	1	13	74	101	9
9.	Odense Bulldogs	18	4	1	13	80	127	9
10.	Gladsaxe SF	18	2	1	15	65	139	5

== Final round ==
	Club	GP	W	T	L	GF	GA	Pts
1.	Esbjerg IK	10	8	1	1	61	41	32
2.	Herning IK	10	6	1	3	64	44	28
3.	Rungsted IK	10	4	1	5	48	46	21
4.	Rødovre Mighty Bulls	10	3	0	7	41	68	19
5.	AaB Ishockey	10	3	2	5	48	50	17
6.	Hellerup IK	10	3	1	6	44	57	17

== Playoffs ==
Semi-finals
Esbjerg IK	3
Rødovre Mighty Bulls	0
Herning IK	3
Rungsted IK	0

Final
Esbjerg IK	3
Herning IK	0
Third place
Rungsted IK	0
Rødovre Mighty Bulls	2
