= 1991–92 Eliteserien (Denmark) season =

Danish ice hockey league season

The 1991–92 Eliteserien season was the 35th season of ice hockey in Denmark. Eight teams participated in the league, and Herning IK won the championship. Herlev IK was relegated to the 1. division.

== Regular season ==
	Club	GP	W	T	L	GF	GA	Pts
1.	Herning IK	28	24	0	4	198	83	48
2.	AaB Ishockey	28	20	1	7	190	109	41
3.	Esbjerg IK	28	17	1	10	157	118	35
4.	Rødovre Mighty Bulls	28	16	2	10	136	106	34
5.	Hellerup IK	28	13	2	13	124	117	28
6.	Frederikshavn White Hawks	28	7	2	19	102	172	16
7.	Odense Bulldogs	28	5	2	21	120	233	12
8.	Herlev IK	28	4	2	22	102	191	10

== Playoffs ==
The top four teams from the regular season qualified for the playoffs. Herning IK defeated Esbjerg IK in the final, and the Rødovre Mighty Bulls defeated AaB Ishockey in the 3rd place game.
