= 1984–85 Danish 1. division season =

Danish ice hockey season

The 1984–85 Danish 1. division season was the 28th season of ice hockey in Denmark. 14 teams participated in the league, and the Rødovre Mighty Bulls won the championship. Due to the league being reformed as the Eliteserien and the number of teams being reduced from 14 to seven for the following season, AaB Ishockey, IK Aalborg, KSF Copenhagen, Gladsaxe SF, Tårnfalkene, Skovbakken, and Rungsted IK were all relegated to the 2. division.

== Regular season ==
	Club	GP	W	T	L	GF	GA	Pts
1.	Rødovre Mighty Bulls	26	22	3	1	172	66	47
2.	Herning IK	26	20	3	3	161	80	43
3.	Herlev IK	26	20	1	5	195	83	41
4.	Esbjerg IK	26	16	4	6	177	86	36
5.	Frederikshavn White Hawks	26	16	1	9	168	93	33
6.	Rungsted IK	26	15	2	9	119	83	32
7.	Hellerup IK	26	12	2	12	114	121	26
8.	Vojens IK	26	12	1	13	93	102	25
9.	AaB Ishockey	26	10	2	14	119	107	22
10.	IK Aalborg	26	9	1	16	109	181	19
11.	KSF Copenhagen	26	7	1	18	100	162	15
12.	Gladsaxe SF	26	6	1	19	111	196	13
13.	Tårnfalkene	26	3	2	21	76	211	8
14.	Skovbakken	26	1	2	23	63	206	4

== Playoffs ==
=== 1st-4th place ===
Team	GP	Pts
Rødovre Mighty Bulls	6	11
Herning IK	6	0
Esbjerg IK	6	6
Herlev IK	6	4

=== 5th-8th place ===
Team	GP	Pts
Frederikshavn White Hawks	6	15
Hellerup IK	6	7
Vojens IK	6	4
Rungsted IK	6	4

== Relegation ==
- Vojens IK - Rungsted IK 3:2
