= Kasper Degn =

- Born: February 25, 1982 (age 43); Herning, Denmark
- Height: 5 ft 9 in (175 cm)
- Weight: 165 lb (75 kg; 11 st 11 lb)
- Position: Forward
- Shot: Left
- Played for: Herning Blue Fox; Nordsjælland Cobras; SC Bietigheim-Bissingen; Aalborg Pirates
- National team: Denmark
- NHL draft: Undrafted
- Playing career: 1998–2015

Kasper Degn is a Danish professional ice hockey player who participated at the 2010 IIHF World Championship as a member of the Denmark National men's ice hockey team.

== Career statistics ==
			Regular season					Playoffs
Season	Team	League	GP	G	A	Pts	PIM	GP	G	A	Pts	PIM
1998–99	Herning IK	Denmark	24	3	2	5	6	—	—	—	—	—
1999–00	Herning Blue Fox	Denmark	36	6	6	12	2	—	—	—	—	—
2000–01	Herning Blue Fox	Denmark	37	11	9	20	16	—	—	—	—	—
2001–02	Herning Blue Fox	Denmark	48	17	37	54	16	—	—	—	—	—
2002–03	Herning Blue Fox	Denmark	28	3	13	16	18	14	4	9	13	4
2003–04	Herning Blue Fox	Denmark	36	9	42	51	28	—	—	—	—	—
2004–05	Nordsjælland Cobras	Denmark	36	8	25	33	16	7	1	2	3	6
2005–06	Nordsjælland Cobras	Denmark	28	10	25	35	45	13	1	14	15	0
2006–07	Nordsjælland Cobras	Denmark	13	3	7	10	14	5	2	3	5	2
2007–08	Nordsjælland Cobras	Denmark	42	18	39	57	22	5	1	3	4	16
2008–09	Bietigheim Steelers	Germany2	45	14	29	43	24	12	4	4	8	12
2009–10	Bietigheim Steelers	Germany2	45	12	32	44	35	12	4	11	15	4
2010–11	AaB Ishockey	Denmark	37	8	22	30	14	4	0	2	2	0
2011–12	AaB Ishockey	Denmark	40	5	26	31	12	13	6	4	10	2
2012–13	Aalborg Pirates	Denmark	40	9	26	35	14	7	2	5	7	0
2013–14	Aalborg Pirates	Denmark	35	13	41	54	16	13	5	8	13	6
2014–15	Herning Blue Fox	Denmark	14	3	10	13	2	15	7	7	14	8
2015–16	Herning Blue Fox	Denmark	18	3	11	14	4	20	4	13	17	2
Denmark totals			512	129	341	470	245	116	33	70	103	46
