= 1962–63 Danish 1. division season =

Danish ice hockey season

The 1962–63 Danish 1. division season was the sixth season of ice hockey in Denmark. Five teams participated in the league, and Rungsted IK won the championship.

== Regular season ==
	Club	GP	W	T	L	GF	GA	Pts
1.	Rungsted IK	8	6	1	1	52	21	13
2.	Esbjerg IK	8	6	1	1	49	23	13
3.	KSF Copenhagen	8	5	0	3	37	37	10
4.	Gladsaxe SF	8	2	0	6	22	37	4
5.	Universitetes Studenter Gymnastik	8	0	0	8	16	58	0
