= 1965–66 Danish 1. division season =

Danish ice hockey season

The 1965–66 Danish 1. division season was the ninth season of ice hockey in Denmark. Seven teams participated in the league, and KSF Copenhagen won the championship.

== Regular season ==
	Club	GP	W	T	L	GF	GA	Pts
1.	KSF Copenhagen	12	8	3	1	73	36	19
2.	Gladsaxe SF	12	8	2	2	88	39	18
3.	Esbjerg IK	12	7	3	2	69	39	17
4.	Rungsted IK	12	7	2	3	58	44	16
5.	Rødovre Mighty Bulls	12	3	0	9	57	56	6
6.	Universitetets Studenter Gymnastik	12	1	2	9	26	85	4
7.	Vojens IK	12	1	2	9	37	109	4
