= 1968–69 Danish 1. division season =

Danish ice hockey season

The 1968–69 Danish 1. division season was the 12th season of ice hockey in Denmark. Eight teams participated in the league, and Esbjerg IK won the championship. AaB Ishockey was relegated.

== Regular season ==
	Club	GP	W	T	L	GF	GA	Pts
1.	Esbjerg IK	14	12	0	2	96	33	24
2.	Gladsaxe SF	14	11	1	2	93	15	23
3.	Vojens IK	14	10	0	4	90	55	20
4.	Rødovre Mighty Bulls	14	9	1	4	71	45	19
5.	Rungsted IK	14	6	2	6	56	51	14
6.	KSF Copenhagen	14	3	0	11	32	73	6
7.	Herning IK	14	2	1	11	35	89	5
8.	AaB Ishockey	14	0	1	13	24	136	1
