= Esbjerg Energy =

- City: Esbjerg, Denmark
- League: Metal Ligaen
- Founded: 2005
- Home arena: Granly Hockey Arena (Capacity: 4,200)
- Colors
- Owner: Christian Rølmer Christensen
- General manager: Peder Krogsgaard
- Head coach: Jason Jaspers
- Captain: Brock Nixon
- Website: www.esbjergenergy.dk

Franchise history
- 1964–2004: Esbjerg IK
- 2005–2013: Esbjerg fB Ishockey
- 2013–present: Esbjerg Energy

Championships
- Playoff championships: 7 (2016–17, 2015–16, 2003–04, 1995–96, 1992–93, 1987–88, 1968–69)

The Esbjerg Energy is a Danish professional ice hockey team based in Esbjerg, Denmark, playing in the Metal Ligaen, the top tier of Danish ice hockey. The club was founded in 2005 and play their home games in the Granly Hockey Arena which has a capacity of 4,200 spectators.

Until 2004 the team played under the name of E.I.K. (Esbjerg Ishockey Klub), but due to financial instability at the club, the professional license was transferred to Esbjerg fB. In early 2013 after spending eight seasons under the umbrella of Esbjerg fB; the football club sold EfB Ishockey to businessman Christian Rølmer Christensen.

== Club history ==
=== 2013–present: Mark Pederson era ===
Season: 2013–2014

In the club's first season under new ownership, the club appointed Mark Pederson as the new head coach. The Canadian, a former NHL player and successful head coach in numerous ice hockey leagues, took over as the club's new coach. Out of the club's eight foreigners of the previous season, only one returned to the club, with the rest leaving to join new clubs. Among the foreigners who left to join new clubs, 3 out of the 8 were top 5 on the team, in points the previous season.

In Pederson's first season as the club's head coach, he led the team to the playoffs, though it was spoiled by a match-fixing scandal. Three of the club's players including, Kirill Starkov, Tyler Mosienko and Dennis Jensen were suspended and fined after admitting to betting on their own team and match-fixing. After losing two key first liners due to suspension; Esbjerg was eliminated in the quarterfinal by local rivals SønderjyskE Ishockey.

Season: 2014–2015

In his second season as head coach, Pedersen added key players Andrew Clark, Mark Derlago and Scott Howe to the club, who together combined for 189 points over 101 games (76 goals and 113 assists). Pedersen managed to lead the club to the finals as they swept Odense, in the quarterfinals, and defeated Herning 4–2 in the semifinals on their way to the finals. Though the club was once again eliminated by SønderjyskE who defended their title for the third straight year.

Season: 2015–2016

For the 2015–16 season, Pedersen managed to keep several dominant core players. At the conclusion of the regular season, Esbjerg finished at a strong third place and were put up against seventh place Rødovre in the quarterfinals. Esbjerg defeated Rødovre in six games, three of which ended in overtime and advance to the semifinals.

In the semifinals, Esbjerg faced local rivals SønderjyskE, the three-time defending champions who had eliminated Esbjerg in the previous two seasons. Esbjerg managed to win the series in seven games, the first time they had defeated SønderjyskE in a seven-game series since 2006. Esbjerg then went on to defeat Herning, 4–2 in a high scoring final, to win their first title since 2004.

Season: 2016–2017

For the time in Esbjerg ice hockey history, The Esbjerg Energy represented Denmark in the Annual Champions League tournament. Esbjerg was placed in Group G with Helsinki and EV Zug, Esbjerg did not advance to the next round, finishing the tournament with a 1–1–2 record.

After their early start to the season with international hockey, Esbjerg Energy struggled in their home league. The first half of the season was spent in the bottom of the league. Second half of the season Esbjerg catapulted to the top of the league winning many games in a row. Esbjerg finished 4th and picked rivals SønderjyskE as their opponents for the quarterfinals. In the Semifinals Esbjerg Energy eliminated Frederikshavn Whitehawks in game seven and advanced to their third final in as many years. In the finals Esbjerg won the championship at home in game 5, making them back-to-back champions for the first time in club history.

== Season by season record ==
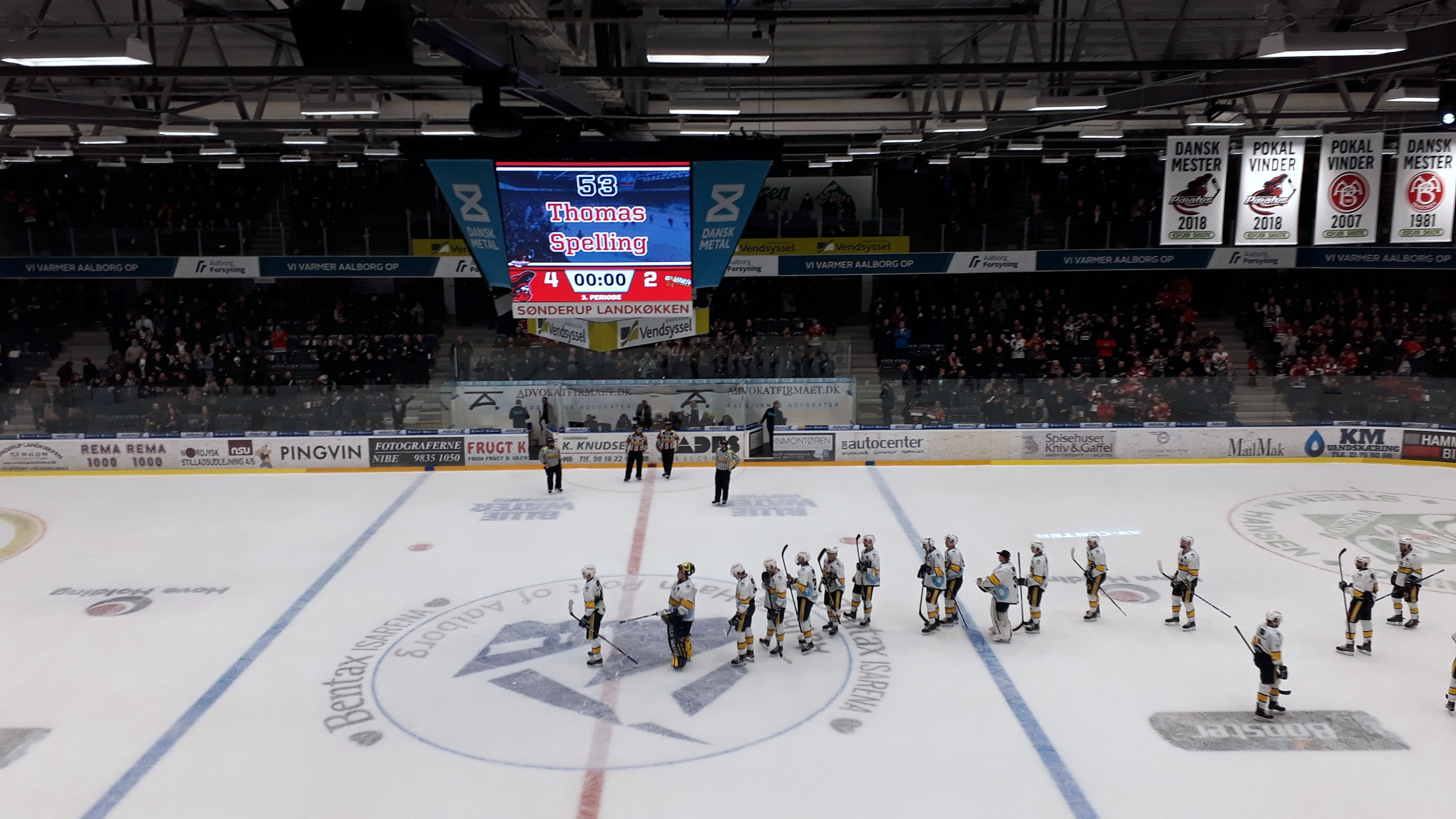
Esbjerg Energy, 2019

Seasons of Esbjerg Energy
Season	Rank	GP	W	L	OTW	OTL	Pts	Postseason
2005–06	8th	36	9	19	5	3	40	Quarterfinal loss
2006–07	3rd	36	12	14	4	6	50	Bronze medal game loss
2007–08	9th	45	14	22	3	6	54	Did not make the playoffs
2008–09	7th	36	13	18	2	3	46	Quarterfinal loss
2009–10	4th	36	12	11	4	9	53	Quarterfinal loss
2010–11	7th	39	10	23	3	3	39	Did not make playoffs
2011–12	8th	40	12	22	3	3	45	Quarter final loss
2012–13	6th	40	14	17	5	4	56	Quarter final loss
2013–14	5th	40	17	18	1	4	57	Quarter final loss
2014–15	5th	36	15	13	6	2	59	Final loss
2015–16	3rd	45	22	14	7	2	82	Champion
2016–17	4th	45	18	12	6	9	75	Champion

== Players ==
=== Current roster ===
Updated 30 September 2024.

No.	Nat	Player	Pos	S/G	Age	Acquired	Birthplace
92	(Denmark)	Lucas Andersen	LW	L	27	2024	Copenhagen, Denmark
48	(Denmark)	Niklas Andersen	RW	L	28	2024	Esbjerg, Denmark
44	(Canada)	Gordie Ballhorn	D	L	28	2023	Wetaskiwin, Alberta, Canada
75	(Switzerland)	Yanick von Bergen	RW	R	22	2024	Interlaken, Switzerland
3	(Denmark)	Jeppe Bertram	D	L	19	2024	Esbjerg, Denmark
17	(Denmark)	Frederik Bjerrum	RW	L	31	2023	Esbjerg, Denmark
27	(Denmark)	Rasmus Bjerrum	LW	L	33	2020	Esbjerg, Denmark
82	(Canada)	Grayson Downing	C	L	33	2021	Abbotsford, British Columbia, Canada
24	(Denmark)	Tobias Ebener	LW	L	20	2022	Esbjerg, Denmark
52	(Denmark)	Oliver Gatz Nielsen	D	L	27	2024	Aalborg, Denmark
22	(Denmark)	Andreas Grundtvig	LW	L	27	2019	Hørsholm, Denmark
70	(Denmark)	Simon Grønvaldt	D	R	35	2019	Rødovre, Denmark
64	(Finland)	Aleksi Halme	LW	L	26	2023	Tampere, Finland
95	(Denmark)	Nicolaj Henriksen	G	L	30	2024	Esbjerg, Denmark
4	(United States)	Jeff King	D	R	30	2021	St. Clair, Michigan, United States
36	(Denmark)	Philip Larsen (C)	D	R	36	2022	Esbjerg, Denmark
88	(United States)	Nick Master	C	L	31	2024	Broomall, Pennsylvania, United States
15	(Denmark)	Thomas Mondrup	C	R	21	2023	Esbjerg, Denmark
6	(Denmark)	Mikkel Rask Nielsen	D	L	23	2020	Esbjerg, Denmark
10	(Denmark)	Victor Sand	C	R	23	2021	Grindsted, Denmark
72	(Denmark)	Phillip Schultz	C	L	25	2023	Rødovre, Denmark
18	(Denmark)	Sebastian Skovning	C	L	21	2023	Esbjerg, Denmark
1	(Italy)	Jacob Smith	G	L	30	2024	Oakville, Ontario, Canada
7	(Finland)	Juuso Walli	D	L	29	2021	Tampere, Finland
47	(Sweden)	Oscar Öhman	C	L	28	2024	Örnsköldsvik, Sweden

=== Retired numbers ===
Esbjerg Energy retired numbers
No.	Player	Position	Career
14	Oleg Starkov	F	1991–2000
15	Søren Jensen	D	1984–2006
16	Andreas Andreasen	D	1994–2012

=== Team captains ===
- Olivier Coqueux, 2008–2009
- Andreas Andreasen, 2009–2010
- Kirill Starkov, 2010–2011
- Sune Hjulmand, 2011–2015
- Aaron Lee, 2015–2016
- Brock Nixon, 2016–2017
- Vacant, 2017–2018
- Marc Hagel, 2018–2019
- Vacant, 2019–2024
- Philip Larsen, 2024-pres.
