= 1990–91 Eliteserien (Denmark) season =

Danish ice hockey league season

The 1990–91 Eliteserien season was the 34th season of ice hockey in Denmark. Eight teams participated in the league, and Herning IK won the championship. Rungsted IK was relegated to the 1. division.

== Regular season ==
	Club	GP	W	T	L	GF	GA	Pts
1.	Herning IK	28	18	6	4	155	94	42
2.	AaB Ishockey	28	18	2	8	146	102	38
3.	Rødovre Mighty Bulls	28	14	5	9	140	107	33
4.	Herlev IK	28	14	4	10	128	115	32
5.	Esbjerg IK	28	11	8	9	159	135	30
6.	Frederikshavn White Hawks	28	7	6	15	95	133	20
7.	Hellerup IK	28	9	1	18	98	134	19
8.	Rungsted IK	28	3	4	21	87	188	10

== Playoffs ==
The top 4 teams from the regular season qualified for the playoffs. Herning IK defeated the Rødovre Mighty Bulls in the final, and AaB Ishockey defeated Herlev IK in the 3rd place game.
