= 1998–99 Codan Ligaen season =

Danish ice hockey league season

The 1998–99 Codan Ligaen season was the 42nd season of ice hockey in Denmark. Ten teams participated in the league, and the Rødovre Mighty Bulls won the championship. IC Gentofte was relegated to the Division 1.

== First round ==
	Club	GP	W	T	L	GF	GA	Pts
1.	Frederikshavn White Hawks	36	25	4	7	183	95	54
2.	Rungsted IK	36	21	7	8	204	148	52
3.	Vojens IK	36	22	4	10	175	143	49
4.	Esbjerg IK	36	20	7	9	179	115	47
5.	Herning IK	36	20	5	11	187	115	47
6.	Rødovre Mighty Bulls	36	16	5	15	149	120	40
7.	Odense Bulldogs	36	13	5	18	138	159	32
8.	Hvidovre Ishockey	36	11	1	24	117	171	23
9.	AaB Ishockey	36	8	4	24	114	191	20
10.	IC Gentofte	36	2	2	32	89	278	6

== Second round ==
=== Group A ===
	Club	GP	W	OTW	T	OTL	L	GF	GA	Pts (Bonus)
1.	Frederikshavn White Hawks	6	5	0	0	1	0	24	11	13(2)
2.	Esbjerg IK	6	2	1	1	0	2	33	19	8(1)
3.	Herning IK	6	3	0	1	0	2	29	24	7(0)
4.	Hvidovre Ishockey	6	0	0	0	0	6	12	44	0(0)

=== Group B ===
	Club	GP	W	OTW	T	OTL	L	GF	GA	Pts (Bonus)
1.	Rødovre Mighty Bulls	6	4	0	0	1	1	25	15	9(0)
2.	Vojens IK	6	3	1	0	0	2	25	24	9(1)
3.	Rungsted IK	6	3	0	0	1	2	28	21	9(2)
4.	Odense Bulldogs	6	0	1	0	0	5	10	28	2(0)

== Playoffs ==
Semi-finals
Frederikshavn White Hawks	3
Vojens IK	0
Esbjerg IK	0
Rødovre Mighty Bulls	3

Final
Frederikshavn White Hawks	0
Rødovre Mighty Bulls	3
Third place
Vojens IK	0
Esbjerg IK	2

== Relegation ==
	Club	GP	W	T	L	GF	GA	Pts
1.	AaB Ishockey	8	7	1	0	71	7	15
2.	IC Gentofte	8	6	0	2	43	25	12
3.	Gladsaxe SF	8	1	2	5	17	48	4
4.	KSF Copenhagen	8	0	1	7	10	61	1

Although IC Gentofte would've avoided relegation, they chose to voluntarily be relegated due to financial issues. Gladsaxe SF took their place in the Codan Ligaen.
