= 1963–64 Danish 1. division season =

Danish ice hockey league season

The 1963–64 Danish 1. division season was the seventh season of ice hockey in Denmark. Five teams participated in the league, and KSF Copenhagen won the championship.

== Regular season ==
	Club	GP	W	T	L	GF	GA	Pts
1.	KSF Copenhagen	8	6	1	1	45	17	13
2.	Rungsted IK	8	5	1	2	50	20	11
3.	Esbjerg IK	8	5	1	2	42	27	11
4.	Gladsaxe SF	8	1	1	6	20	54	3
5.	Universitetes Studenter Gymnastik	8	1	0	7	23	62	2
