= 2019 World Junior Ice Hockey Championships rosters =

Below are the rosters for teams competing in the 2019 World Junior Ice Hockey Championships.

== Group A ==
=== Canada ===
- Head coach: (Canada) Tim Hunter

| Pos. | No. | Player | Team | NHL Rights |
|---|---|---|---|---|
| G | 1 | Michael DiPietro | (Canada) Ottawa 67's | Vancouver Canucks |
| G | 31 | Ian Scott | (Canada) Prince Albert Raiders | Toronto Maple Leafs |
| D | 2 | Evan Bouchard – A | (Canada) London Knights | Edmonton Oilers |
| D | 3 | Josh Brook | (Canada) Moose Jaw Warriors | Montreal Canadiens |
| D | 4 | Jared McIsaac | (Canada) Halifax Mooseheads | Detroit Red Wings |
| D | 5 | Ian Mitchell – A | (United States) University of Denver | Chicago Blackhawks |
| D | 6 | Noah Dobson | (Canada) Acadie–Bathurst Titan | New York Islanders |
| D | 18 | Markus Phillips | (Canada) Owen Sound Attack | Los Angeles Kings |
| D | 24 | Ty Smith | (United States) Spokane Chiefs | New Jersey Devils |
| F | 8 | Cody Glass | (United States) Portland Winterhawks | Vegas Golden Knights |
| F | 9 | Joe Veleno | (Canada) Drummondville Voltigeurs | Detroit Red Wings |
| F | 11 | Jaret Anderson-Dolan – A | (United States) Spokane Chiefs | Los Angeles Kings |
| F | 14 | Max Comtois – C | (Canada) Drummondville Voltigeurs | Anaheim Ducks |
| F | 15 | Shane Bowers | (United States) Boston University | Colorado Avalanche |
| F | 16 | MacKenzie Entwistle | (Canada) Hamilton Bulldogs | Chicago Blackhawks |
| F | 17 | Nick Suzuki | (Canada) Owen Sound Attack | Montreal Canadiens |
| F | 20 | Brett Leason | (Canada) Prince Albert Raiders | |
| F | 21 | Owen Tippett | (Canada) Mississauga Steelheads | Florida Panthers |
| F | 22 | Alexis Lafrenière | (Canada) Rimouski Océanic | |
| F | 23 | Jack Studnicka | (Canada) Oshawa Generals | Boston Bruins |
| F | 26 | Morgan Frost | (Canada) Sault Ste. Marie Greyhounds | Philadelphia Flyers |
| F | 27 | Barrett Hayton | (Canada) Sault Ste. Marie Greyhounds | Arizona Coyotes |

=== Czech Republic ===
- Head coach: (Czech Republic) Václav Varaďa

| Pos. | No. | Player | Team | NHL Rights |
|---|---|---|---|---|
| G | 1 | Jakub Škarek | (Finland) Lahti Pelicans | New York Islanders |
| G | 2 | Lukáš Dostál | (Czech Republic) SK Horácká Slavia Třebíč | Anaheim Ducks |
| G | 30 | Jiří Patera | (Canada) Brandon Wheat Kings | Vegas Golden Knights |
| D | 7 | David Kvasnička | (Czech Republic) HC Stadion Litoměřice | |
| D | 9 | Michael Gaspar | (Czech Republic) HC Stadion Litoměřice | |
| D | 10 | Jakub Galvas – A | (Czech Republic) HC Olomouc | Chicago Blackhawks |
| D | 11 | Filip Král | (United States) Spokane Chiefs | Toronto Maple Leafs |
| D | 22 | Dalimil Mikyska | (Czech Republic) SK Horácká Slavia Třebíč | |
| D | 23 | Daniel Bukač | (Canada) Niagara IceDogs | Boston Bruins |
| F | 5 | Matej Pekar | (Canada) Barrie Colts | Buffalo Sabres |
| F | 12 | Jan Kern | (United States) Omaha Lancers | |
| F | 13 | Jan Hladoník | (Czech Republic) HC Oceláři Třinec | |
| F | 15 | Jakub Lauko | (Canada) Rouyn-Noranda Huskies | Boston Bruins |
| F | 16 | Martin Kaut – A | (United States) Colorado Eagles | Colorado Avalanche |
| F | 17 | Ondřej Machala | (Czech Republic) HC Dynamo Pardubice | |
| F | 18 | Martin Nečas – C | (United States) Charlotte Checkers | Carolina Hurricanes |
| F | 19 | Filip Zadina | (United States) Grand Rapids Griffins | Detroit Red Wings |
| F | 25 | Jakub Pour | (Czech Republic) HC Stadion Litoměřice | |
| F | 26 | Kryštof Hrabík | (United States) Tri-City Americans | |
| F | 28 | Karel Plášek | (Czech Republic) HC Kometa Brno | |
| F | 29 | Jáchym Kondelík | (United States) University of Connecticut | Nashville Predators |

=== Denmark ===
- Head coach: (Denmark) Olaf Eller

| Pos. | No. | Player | Team | NHL Rights |
|---|---|---|---|---|
| G | 1 | William Wessel Funke Rørth | (Denmark) Rødovre Mighty Bulls | |
| G | 30 | Mads Søgaard | (Canada) Medicine Hat Tigers | |
| G | 31 | Albert Adamsen | (Denmark) Herning Blue Fox | |
| D | 2 | Magnus Uldahl Koch | (Denmark) Herlev Eagles | |
| D | 3 | Malte Setkov | (Sweden) Malmö Redhawks | Detroit Red Wings |
| D | 4 | Lasse Holm Mortensen | (Denmark) Rødovre Mighty Bulls | |
| D | 6 | Victor Mohrsen Andersen | (Denmark) Herning Blue Fox | |
| D | 7 | Jeppe Urup Mogensen | (United States) Sioux Falls Stampede | |
| D | 8 | Daniel Andersen – A | (Sweden) Linköpings HC | |
| D | 25 | Oscar Winther Schulze | (Denmark) Rungsted Seier Capital | |
| F | 10 | Jonatan Brinkman | (Denmark) Aalborg Pirates | |
| F | 13 | Oliver Kjær | (Denmark) Esbjerg Energy | |
| F | 16 | Jonas Røndbjerg – C | (Sweden) Växjö Lakers | Vegas Golden Knights |
| F | 17 | Lucas Andersen | (Sweden) Karlskrona HK | |
| F | 18 | Jakob Søes Wittendorf | (Denmark) Odense Bulldogs | |
| F | 19 | Christoffer Thrane Gath | (Denmark) Herlev Eagles | |
| F | 20 | Lucas Søgaard Bach Nielsen | (Switzerland) EV Zug U20 | |
| F | 21 | Gustav Green | (Denmark) Rungsted Seier Capital | |
| F | 22 | Andreas Grundtvig – A | (Denmark) Esbjerg Energy | |
| F | 23 | David Søgaard Madsen | (Sweden) Malmö Redhawks J20 | |
| F | 24 | Emil Marcussen | (Denmark) Aalborg Pirates | |
| F | 27 | Phillip Schultz | (Canada) Victoria Royals | |
| F | 29 | Victor Cubars | (Denmark) Hvidovre Fighters | |

=== Russia ===
- Head coach: (Russia) Valeri Bragin

| Pos. | No. | Player | Team | NHL Rights |
|---|---|---|---|---|
| G | 1 | Amir Miftakhov | (Russia) JHC Bars | |
| G | 20 | Pyotr Kochetkov | (Russia) HC Ryazan | |
| G | 30 | Daniil Tarasov | (Russia) Toros Neftekamsk | Columbus Blue Jackets |
| D | 2 | Danil Zhuravlyov | (Russia) JHC Bars | Colorado Avalanche |
| D | 4 | Alexander Alexeyev | (Canada) Red Deer Rebels | Washington Capitals |
| D | 5 | Dmitri Samorukov – A | (Canada) Guelph Storm | Edmonton Oilers |
| D | 6 | Ilya Morozov | (Russia) Sibir Novosibirsk | |
| D | 8 | Saveli Olshansky | (Russia) Metallurg Magnitogorsk | |
| D | 26 | Alexander Romanov | (Russia) CSKA Moscow | Montreal Canadiens |
| D | 27 | Mark Rubinchik | (Russia) Toros Neftekamsk | |
| F | 9 | Artyom Galimov | (Russia) JHC Bars | |
| F | 10 | Stepan Starkov | (Russia) HC Sochi | |
| F | 11 | Vasili Podkolzin | (Russia) SKA-1946 | |
| F | 12 | Kirill Marchenko | (Russia) SKA Saint Petersburg | Columbus Blue Jackets |
| F | 14 | Vitali Kravtsov – A | (Russia) Traktor Chelyabinsk | New York Rangers |
| F | 15 | Nikolai Kovalenko | (Russia) Lokomotiv Yaroslavl | Colorado Avalanche |
| F | 16 | Pavel Shen | (Russia) Salavat Yulaev Ufa | Boston Bruins |
| F | 17 | Ivan Morozov | (Russia) SKA Saint Petersburg | Vegas Golden Knights |
| F | 18 | Nikita Shashkov | (Russia) Sibir Novosibirsk | |
| F | 23 | Ivan Muranov | (Russia) Dynamo Moscow | |
| F | 24 | Klim Kostin – C | (United States) San Antonio Rampage | St. Louis Blues |
| F | 28 | Grigori Denisenko | (Russia) Lokomotiv Yaroslavl | Florida Panthers |
| F | 29 | Kirill Slepets | (Russia) Lokomotiv Yaroslavl | |

=== Switzerland ===
- Head coach: (Switzerland) Christian Wohlwend

| Pos. | No. | Player | Team | NHL Rights |
|---|---|---|---|---|
| G | 1 | Gianluca Zaetta | (Switzerland) EV Zug | |
| G | 29 | Akira Schmid | (United States) Omaha Lancers | New Jersey Devils |
| G | 30 | Luca Hollenstein | (Switzerland) EV Zug | |
| D | 4 | Simon Le Coultre | (Canada) Moncton Wildcats | |
| D | 7 | Gianluca Burger | (Switzerland) GCK Lions | |
| D | 8 | Janis Jérôme Moser | (Switzerland) EHC Biel | |
| D | 16 | Nico Gross – A | (Canada) Oshawa Generals | New York Rangers |
| D | 19 | Davyd Barandun | (Switzerland) HC Davos | |
| D | 21 | Tim Berni | (Switzerland) ZSC Lions | Columbus Blue Jackets |
| D | 26 | David Aebischer | (Canada) Gatineau Olympiques | |
| F | 6 | Marco Lehmann | (Switzerland) EHC Kloten | |
| F | 9 | Nicolas Müller | (Sweden) Modo Hockey J20 | |
| F | 10 | Yannick Bruschweiler | (Switzerland) GCK Lions | |
| F | 11 | Sven Leuenberger | (Switzerland) EV Zug | |
| F | 12 | Jeremi Gerber | (Switzerland) SC Bern | |
| F | 13 | Justin Sigrist | (Switzerland) GCK Lions | |
| F | 14 | Sandro Schmid | (Sweden) Malmö Redhawks J20 | |
| F | 15 | Matthew Verboon | (Canada) Salmon Arm Silverbacks | |
| F | 17 | Luka Wyss | (Switzerland) SC Langenthal | |
| F | 18 | Valentin Nussbaumer | (Canada) Shawinigan Cataractes | |
| F | 20 | Ramon Tanner | (Switzerland) EHC Biel | |
| F | 22 | Nando Eggenberger – C | (Canada) Oshawa Generals | |
| F | 23 | Philipp Kurashev – A | (Canada) Quebec Remparts | Chicago Blackhawks |

== Group B ==
=== Finland ===
- Head coach: (Finland) Jussi Ahokas

| Pos. | No. | Player | Team | NHL Rights |
|---|---|---|---|---|
| G | 1 | Ukko-Pekka Luukkonen | (Canada) Sudbury Wolves | Buffalo Sabres |
| G | 30 | Lassi Lehtinen | (Finland) Lukko | |
| G | 31 | Filip Lindberg | (United States) University of Massachusetts Amherst | |
| D | 2 | Oskari Laaksonen | (Finland) Ilves | Buffalo Sabres |
| D | 3 | Toni Utunen | (Finland) Tappara | Vancouver Canucks |
| D | 7 | Urho Vaakanainen – A | (United States) Boston Bruins | Boston Bruins |
| D | 15 | Henri Jokiharju – A | (United States) Chicago Blackhawks | Chicago Blackhawks |
| D | 21 | Otto Latvala | (Finland) HPK | |
| D | 34 | Ville Heinola | (Finland) Lukko | |
| D | 36 | Anttoni Honka | (Finland) JYP | |
| F | 10 | Aleksi Heponiemi | (Finland) Kärpät | Florida Panthers |
| F | 12 | Samuli Vainionpää | (Finland) Ilves | |
| F | 13 | Valtteri Puustinen | (Finland) HPK | |
| F | 18 | Teemu Engberg | (Finland) HIFK | |
| F | 19 | Rasmus Kupari | (Finland) Kärpät | Los Angeles Kings |
| F | 20 | Eeli Tolvanen | (United States) Milwaukee Admirals | Nashville Predators |
| F | 22 | Santeri Virtanen | (Finland) SaiPa | Winnipeg Jets |
| F | 23 | Linus Nyman | (Finland) Lukko | |
| F | 24 | Kaapo Kakko | (Finland) TPS | |
| F | 25 | Aarne Talvitie – C | (United States) Penn State University | New Jersey Devils |
| F | 27 | Jesse Ylönen | (Finland) Lahti Pelicans | Montreal Canadiens |
| F | 28 | Sami Moilanen | (Finland) Tappara | |
| F | 29 | Anton Lundell | (Finland) HIFK | |

=== Kazakhstan ===
- Head coach: (Kazakhstan)

| Pos. | No. | Player | Team | NHL Rights |
|---|---|---|---|---|
| G | 1 | Vladislav Nurek | (Kazakhstan) Altay Ust-Kamenogorsk | |
| G | 20 | Denis Karatayev | (Kazakhstan) Snezhnye Barsy | |
| G | 30 | Demid Yeremeyev | (Kazakhstan) Snezhnye Barsy | |
| D | 3 | Ernar Musabayev | (Kazakhstan) Snezhnye Barsy | |
| D | 7 | Samat Daniyar – A | (Kazakhstan) Snezhnye Barsy | |
| D | 9 | Valeri Orekhov – A | (Kazakhstan) Barys Astana | |
| D | 19 | Yaroslav Khripkov | (Kazakhstan) Altay Ust-Kamenogorsk | |
| D | 21 | Artyom Korolyov | (Kazakhstan) Snezhnye Barsy | |
| D | 23 | David Muratov | (Kazakhstan) Snezhnye Barsy | |
| D | 24 | Yevgeni Shinkaretsky | (Kazakhstan) Snezhnye Barsy | |
| F | 5 | Oleg Boiko | (Kazakhstan) Snezhnye Barsy | |
| F | 6 | Andrei Buyalski | (Kazakhstan) HC Temirtau | |
| F | 8 | Aidos Zhorabek | (Kazakhstan) Snezhnye Barsy | |
| F | 11 | Dias Guseinov | (Kazakhstan) Snezhnye Barsy | |
| F | 12 | Davyd Makutsky | (Kazakhstan) Snezhnye Barsy | |
| F | 15 | Artur Gatiyatov | (Kazakhstan) Snezhnye Barsy | |
| F | 17 | Sayan Daniyar – C | (Kazakhstan) Snezhnye Barsy | |
| F | 18 | Batyrlan Muratov | (Kazakhstan) Snezhnye Barsy | |
| F | 25 | Dmitri Mitenkov | (Kazakhstan) Snezhnye Barsy | |
| F | 26 | Ruslan Dyomin | (Kazakhstan) HC Temirtau | |
| F | 27 | Danil Tretiakovski | (Kazakhstan) Altay Ust-Kamenogorsk | |
| F | 28 | Ivan Vereshagin | (Kazakhstan) Nomad Astana | |
| F | 29 | Maxim Musorov | (Kazakhstan) Snezhnye Barsy | |

=== Slovakia ===
- Head coach: (Slovakia) Ernest Bokroš

| Pos. | No. | Player | Team | NHL Rights |
|---|---|---|---|---|
| G | 1 | Jakub Kostelný | (Slovakia) HK Orange 20 | |
| G | 2 | Samuel Hlavaj | (Slovakia) MHA Martin | |
| G | 30 | Juraj Sklenár | (Slovakia) HK Orange 20 | |
| D | 6 | Martin Fehérváry – C | (Sweden) HV71 | Washington Capitals |
| D | 7 | Marek Korenčík | (Sweden) Luleå HF J20 | |
| D | 8 | Marcel Dlugoš | (Slovakia) HK Orange 20 | |
| D | 9 | Andrej Golian | (Slovakia) HK Orange 20 | |
| D | 14 | Daniel Demo | (Sweden) Luleå HF J20 | |
| D | 22 | Adam Žiak | (Finland) TUTO Hockey | |
| D | 29 | Michal Ivan | (Canada) Acadie–Bathurst Titan | |
| F | 13 | Filip Krivošík – A | (Finland) HPK | |
| F | 15 | Pavol Regenda | (Sweden) Växjö Lakers J20 | |
| F | 17 | Miloš Kelemen | (Slovakia) HKm Zvolen | |
| F | 18 | Patrik Hrehorčák | (Canada) Rouyn-Noranda Huskies | |
| F | 19 | Miloš Fafrák | (Slovakia) HK Orange 20 | |
| F | 21 | Adam Ružička | (Canada) Sarnia Sting | Calgary Flames |
| F | 23 | Adam Líška – A | (Slovakia) Slovan Bratislava | |
| F | 24 | Jozef Baláž | (Czech Republic) HC Vítkovice Ridera | |
| F | 25 | Martin Pospíšil | (United States) Sioux City Musketeers | Calgary Flames |
| F | 26 | Miloš Roman | (Canada) Vancouver Giants | Calgary Flames |
| F | 27 | Andrej Kollár | (Slovakia) HK Orange 20 | |
| F | 28 | Andrej Kukuča | (United States) Seattle Thunderbirds | |

=== Sweden ===
- Head coach: (Sweden) Tomas Montén

| Pos. | No. | Player | Team | NHL Rights |
|---|---|---|---|---|
| G | 1 | Adam Åhman | (Sweden) IK Oskarshamn | |
| G | 30 | Samuel Ersson | (Sweden) VIK Västerås HK | Philadelphia Flyers |
| G | 35 | Olle Eriksson Ek | (Sweden) BIK Karlskoga | Anaheim Ducks |
| D | 3 | Adam Boqvist | (Canada) London Knights | Chicago Blackhawks |
| D | 5 | Adam Ginning | (Sweden) Linköpings HC | Philadelphia Flyers |
| D | 8 | Rasmus Sandin | (Canada) Toronto Marlies | Toronto Maple Leafs |
| D | 9 | Nils Lundkvist | (Sweden) Luleå HF | New York Rangers |
| D | 12 | Erik Brännström – C | (United States) Chicago Wolves | Vegas Golden Knights |
| D | 16 | Filip Westerlund | (Sweden) Frölunda HC | Arizona Coyotes |
| D | 25 | Philip Broberg | (Sweden) AIK | |
| F | 10 | Emil Bemström | (Sweden) Djurgårdens IF | Columbus Blue Jackets |
| F | 11 | Samuel Fagemo | (Sweden) Frölunda HC | |
| F | 13 | Johan Södergran | (Sweden) Linköpings HC | Los Angeles Kings |
| F | 15 | Oskar Bäck | (Sweden) BIK Karlskoga | Dallas Stars |
| F | 17 | Filip Sveningsson | (Sweden) IK Oskarshamn | Calgary Flames |
| F | 18 | Jacob Olofsson | (Sweden) Timrå IK | Montreal Canadiens |
| F | 19 | Filip Hållander | (Sweden) Timrå IK | Pittsburgh Penguins |
| F | 22 | Isac Lundeström – A | (United States) San Diego Gulls | Anaheim Ducks |
| F | 23 | Lucas Elvenes | (Sweden) Rögle BK | Vegas Golden Knights |
| F | 26 | Rickard Hugg – A | (Canada) Kitchener Rangers | |
| F | 27 | David Gustafsson | (Sweden) HV71 | Winnipeg Jets |
| F | 28 | Fabian Zetterlund – A | (Sweden) Färjestad BK | New Jersey Devils |
| F | 29 | Pontus Holmberg | (Sweden) Växjö Lakers | Toronto Maple Leafs |

=== United States ===
- Head coach: (United States) Mike Hastings

| Pos. | No. | Player | Team | NHL Rights |
|---|---|---|---|---|
| G | 1 | Kyle Keyser | (Canada) Oshawa Generals | Boston Bruins |
| G | 29 | Spencer Knight | (United States) U.S. National Development Team | |
| G | 30 | Cayden Primeau | (United States) Northeastern University | Montreal Canadiens |
| D | 2 | Jack St. Ivany | (United States) Yale University | Philadelphia Flyers |
| D | 4 | Dylan Samberg | (United States) University of Minnesota Duluth | Winnipeg Jets |
| D | 7 | Quinn Hughes – A | (United States) University of Michigan | Vancouver Canucks |
| D | 20 | K'Andre Miller | (United States) University of Wisconsin | New York Rangers |
| D | 24 | Mattias Samuelsson | (United States) Western Michigan University | Buffalo Sabres |
| D | 25 | Philip Kemp | (United States) Yale University | Edmonton Oilers |
| D | 26 | Mikey Anderson – C | (United States) University of Minnesota Duluth | Los Angeles Kings |
| F | 6 | Jack Hughes | (United States) U.S. National Development Team | |
| F | 8 | Alexander Chmelevski | (Canada) Ottawa 67's | San Jose Sharks |
| F | 9 | Tyler Madden | (United States) Northeastern University | Vancouver Canucks |
| F | 11 | Ryan Poehling | (United States) St. Cloud State University | Montreal Canadiens |
| F | 12 | Logan Cockerill | (United States) Boston University | New York Islanders |
| F | 14 | Josh Norris – A | (United States) University of Michigan | Ottawa Senators |
| F | 15 | Jason Robertson | (Canada) Niagara IceDogs | Dallas Stars |
| F | 16 | Jay O'Brien | (United States) Providence College | Philadelphia Flyers |
| F | 17 | Evan Barratt | (United States) Penn State University | Chicago Blackhawks |
| F | 18 | Oliver Wahlstrom | (United States) Boston College | New York Islanders |
| F | 19 | Jack Drury | (United States) Harvard University | Carolina Hurricanes |
| F | 21 | Noah Cates | (United States) University of Minnesota Duluth | Philadelphia Flyers |
| F | 28 | Joel Farabee | (United States) Boston University | Philadelphia Flyers |
