= 1979–80 Danish 1. division season =

Danish ice hockey season

The 1979–80 Danish 1. division season was the 23rd season of ice hockey in Denmark. Eight teams participated in the league, and Vojens IK won the championship. Hvidovre Ishockey was relegated.

== Regular season ==
| | Club | GP | W | T | L | GF | GA | Pts |
|---|---|---|---|---|---|---|---|---|
| 1. | Vojens IK | 28 | 23 | 1 | 4 | 190 | 87 | 47 |
| 2. | Rungsted IK | 28 | 19 | 2 | 7 | 152 | 87 | 40 |
| 3. | AaB Ishockey | 28 | 18 | 1 | 9 | 134 | 91 | 37 |
| 4. | Rødovre Mighty Bulls | 28 | 17 | 2 | 9 | 182 | 110 | 36 |
| 5. | KSF Copenhagen | 28 | 12 | 1 | 15 | 119 | 120 | 25 |
| 6. | Esbjerg IK | 28 | 8 | 2 | 18 | 95 | 163 | 18 |
| 7. | Herning IK | 28 | 7 | 1 | 20 | 114 | 144 | 15 |
| 8. | Hvidovre Ishockey | 28 | 3 | 0 | 25 | 68 | 252 | 6 |
