= 1977–78 Danish 1. division season =

Danish ice hockey season

The 1977–78 Danish 1. division season was the 21st season of ice hockey in Denmark. Eight teams participated in the league, and the Rødovre Mighty Bulls won the championship. Gladsaxe SF was relegated.

== Regular season ==
	Club	GP	W	T	L	GF	GA	Pts
1.	Rødovre Mighty Bulls	28	22	4	2	174	70	48
2.	KSF Copenhagen	28	19	3	6	128	101	41
3.	Vojens IK	28	13	5	10	126	102	31
4.	Rungsted IK	28	14	2	12	115	112	30
5.	AaB Ishockey	28	11	4	13	118	121	26
6.	Herning IK	28	8	3	17	113	156	19
7.	Esbjerg IK	28	5	7	16	87	129	17
8.	Gladsaxe SF	28	5	2	21	69	139	12
