= Sergei Solomatov =

Russian ice hockey player (born 1973)

- Born: August 22, 1973 (age 51); Chelyabinsk, Russian SFSR, Soviet Union
- Height: 5 ft 10 in (178 cm)
- Weight: 187 lb (85 kg; 13 st 5 lb)
- Position: Forward
- Shot: Left
- Played for: Mechel Chelyabinsk; Amurstal Komsomolsk; Metallurg Magnitogorsk; Traktor Chelyabinsk; Ak Bars Kazan; Rødovre Mighty Bulls; Amur Khabarovsk; HC Spartak Moscow; Sibir Novosibirsk
- National team: Russia
- Playing career: 1991–2003

Sergei Solomatov (born August 22, 1973) is a Soviet and Russian former professional ice hockey forward. He is a one-time Russian and Danish Champion. After completing his career as a player, he became a coach.

== Awards and honors ==
Award	Year
Russian Superleague
Champion (Ak Bars Kazan)	1998
Danish Championship
Champion (Rødovre Mighty Bulls)	1999
