= 1980–81 Danish 1. division season =

24th season of ice hockey in Denmark

The 1980–81 Danish 1. division season was the 24th season of ice hockey in Denmark. Eight teams participated in the league, and AaB Ishockey won the championship. Esbjerg IK was relegated.

== Regular season ==
| | Club | GP | W | T | L | GF | GA | Pts |
|---|---|---|---|---|---|---|---|---|
| 1. | AaB Ishockey | 28 | 22 | 3 | 3 | 180 | 98 | 47 |
| 2. | Rødovre Mighty Bulls | 28 | 21 | 3 | 4 | 161 | 101 | 45 |
| 3. | Herning IK | 28 | 16 | 2 | 10 | 155 | 106 | 34 |
| 4. | Vojens IK | 28 | 13 | 1 | 14 | 126 | 108 | 27 |
| 5. | Rungsted IK | 28 | 12 | 2 | 14 | 116 | 105 | 26 |
| 6. | KSF Copenhagen | 28 | 8 | 0 | 20 | 86 | 157 | 16 |
| 7. | Frederikshavn White Hawks | 28 | 6 | 4 | 18 | 108 | 180 | 16 |
| 8. | Esbjerg IK | 28 | 6 | 1 | 21 | 101 | 178 | 13 |
