= 1981–82 Danish 1. division season =

Danish ice hockey season

The 1981–82 Danish 1. division season was the 25th season of ice hockey in Denmark. Eight teams participated in the league, and Vojens IK won the championship. Herning IK was relegated.

== Regular season ==
	Club	GP	W	T	L	GF	GA	Pts
1.	Vojens IK	28	21	2	5	163	85	44
2.	Rødovre Mighty Bulls	28	18	2	8	125	109	38
3.	AaB Ishockey	28	18	0	10	141	99	36
4.	Frederikshavn White Hawks	28	14	1	13	113	127	29
5.	Herning IK	28	14	1	13	150	126	28
6.	Rungsted IK	28	10	2	16	93	132	22
7.	Hellerup IK	28	7	0	21	100	163	14
8.	KSF Copenhagen	28	6	1	21	90	134	13

== Playoffs ==
=== Semifinals ===
- Vojens IK - Frederikshavn White Hawks 2:1 (4:2, 3:5, 9:1)
- Rødovre Mighty Bulls - AaB Ishockey 2:0 (3:1, 4:2)

=== Final ===
- Vojens IK - Rødovre Mighty Bulls 2:1 (2:4, 6:3, 5:3)

=== 3rd place ===
- AaB Ishockey - Frederikshavn White Hawks 2:1 (2:1, 2:5, 2:1)

== Relegation ==
- KSF Copenhagen - Herning IK 2:1 (5:2, 2:4, 5:2)
- Rungsted IK - Hellerup IK 2:1 (3:4, 2:1, 5:3)
- Rungsted IK - KSF Copenhagen 2-0 on series
- Hellerup IK - Herning IK 2-1 on series
