= 1978–79 Danish 1. division season =

Danish ice hockey season

The 1978–79 Danish 1. division season was the 22nd season of ice hockey in Denmark. Eight teams participated in the league, and Vojens IK won the championship. The Frederikshavn White Hawks were relegated.

== Regular season ==
	Club	GP	W	T	L	GF	GA	Pts
1.	Vojens IK	28	22	3	3	171	78	47
2.	Rødovre Mighty Bulls	28	18	4	6	150	93	40
3.	AaB Ishockey	28	18	2	8	154	115	38
4.	Rungsted IK	28	16	5	7	149	102	37
5.	KSF Copenhagen	28	9	5	14	108	123	23
6.	Herning IK	28	10	0	18	111	172	20
7.	Esbjerg IK	28	5	2	21	106	171	12
8.	Frederikshavn White Hawks	28	3	1	24	109	204	7
