= 1961–62 Danish 1. division season =

Danish ice hockey season

The 1961–62 Danish 1. division season was the fifth season of ice hockey in Denmark. Four teams participated in the league, and KSF Copenhagen won the championship.

== Regular season ==
	Club	GP	W	T	L	GF	GA	Pts
1.	KSF Copenhagen	6	6	0	0	41	5	12
2.	Rungsted IK	6	4	0	2	23	16	8
3.	Furesø	5	1	1	3	8	23	3
4.	Esbjerg SK	5	0	0	5	6	34	0
