= Simon Fredriksson =

Swedish ice hockey player

- Born: 18 May 1993 (age 33) Karlstad, Sweden
- Height: 6 ft 5 in (196 cm)
- Weight: 220 lb (100 kg; 15 st 10 lb)
- Position: Defence
- Shoots: Left
- Metal Ligaen team Former teams: Rungsted Seier Capital; Färjestad BK
- NHL draft: Undrafted
- Playing career: 2012–present

Simon Fredriksson (born 18 May 1993) is a Swedish ice hockey player. He made his Elitserien debut playing with Färjestads BK during the 2012–13 Elitserien season. He currently plays for the Danish team Rungsted Seier Capital of the Danish Metal Ligaen.
