= 1954–55 Danish Ice Hockey Championship season =

The 1954–55 Danish Ice Hockey Championship season was the first season of ice hockey in Denmark. Three teams participated in the final tournament, and Rungsted IK won the championship.

== Jütland Regional Tournament ==
The Jütland Regional Tournament was contested on 19 and 20 February 1955 in Silkeborg.

=== Semifinal ===
- Silkeborg SF - Horsens SF 2:1 OT

=== Final ===
- Silkeborg SF - Esbjerg SK 6:2

== Final tournament ==
Team	GP	W	T	L	GF	GA	Pts
Rungsted IK	2	2	0	0	19	7	4
KSF Copenhagen	2	1	0	1	20	5	2
Silkeborg SF	2	0	0	2	6	32	0
