= 1982–83 Danish 1. division season =

Danish ice hockey season

The 1982–83 Danish 1. division season was the 26th season of ice hockey in Denmark. Eight teams participated in the league, and the Rødovre Mighty Bulls won the championship. The Frederikshavn White Hawks were relegated.

== Regular season ==
	Club	GP	W	T	L	GF	GA	Pts
1.	Rødovre Mighty Bulls	28	19	3	6	134	92	41
2.	Herlev IK	28	18	2	8	167	129	38
3.	AaB Ishockey	28	17	2	9	142	101	36
4.	Rungsted IK	28	16	3	9	138	110	35
5.	Vojens IK	28	14	2	12	124	104	30
6.	Hellerup IK	28	9	0	19	125	160	18
7.	Frederikshavn White Hawks	28	6	3	19	100	168	15
8.	KSF Copenhagen	28	4	3	21	75	141	11

== Playoffs ==
=== Semifinals ===
- Rødovre Mighty Bulls - Rungsted IK 2–0 (5–0, 5–1)
- AaB Ishockey - Herlev IK 2–1 (4–7, 10–2, 10–2)

=== Final ===
- Rødovre Mighty Bulls - AaB Ishockey 2–1 (6–7, 3–2 OT, 4–3)

=== 3rd place ===
- Herlev IK - Rungsted IK 2–1 (3–6, 5–3, 4–3)

== Relegation ==
- KSF Copenhagen - Vojens IK 2–1 on series
- Hellerup IK - Frederikshavn White Hawks 2–0 on series
- KSF Copenhagen - Hellerup IK 2–1 on series
- Vojens IK - Frederikshavn White Hawks 2–0 on series
