= Jørgen Hviid =

Danish athlete and naval officer (1916–2001)

- Hviid in Royal Danish Navy uniform, c. 1961
- Born: 1 September 1916; Moscow, Russian Empire
- Died: 5 September 2001 (aged 85); Helsingør, Denmark
- Known for: Kjøbenhavns SF hockey team founder and multi-sport athlete
- Awards: IIHF Hall of Fame
- Military career
- Allegiance: Royal Danish Navy
- Service / branch: Danish Brigade in Sweden
- Rank: Commander
Ice hockey career
- Position: Forward
- Played for: Kjøbenhavns SF
- National team: Denmark and Latvia
- Playing career: 1931–1961

Jørgen Alfred Hviid (Latvian: Jergens Alfreds Hvīds; 1 September 1916 – 5 September 2001) was a Danish and Latvian multi-sport athlete, and an officer in the Royal Danish Navy. He was primarily an ice hockey player, but also competed in speed skating and sailing.

Hviid grew up in Riga, and played on the Latvia men's national ice hockey team as a teenager. He later moved to Denmark, and joined the Danish resistance movement at the onset of World War II, and began a military career. He founded the Kjøbenhavns SF hockey team in 1938, and served as the first captain of the Denmark men's national ice hockey team at the 1949 World Ice Hockey Championships. He won Danish ice hockey league championships as a player and as a coach, and was later a board member on the Danish Ice Hockey Union. He was posthumously inducted into both the IIHF Hall of Fame, and the Danish Ice Hockey Hall of Fame, and is referred to as the "father of Danish ice hockey".

== Early life ==
Hviid was born 1 September 1916, in Moscow. His father worked as a wholesale merchant. Hviid's father moved the family business from Moscow due to the Russian Revolution, and fled to Denmark. The family moved again to Riga in 1921, but later returned to Denmark in 1934, due to the changing political situation in Latvia.

Hviid attended school in Riga, and participated in ice boat races on lakes in Latvia. Later in Denmark he practiced speed skating on the Peblingesøen in Copenhagen, and became the Danish champion in barrel jumping.

== Hockey career ==
Hviid started playing organized ice hockey in 1931 as a forward in Latvia. As a 16-year old, he was one of the stronger players in Latvia, and scored four goals in four championship games for the Union Riga team. He twice was a Latvian champion in 1932 and 1933. Despite his young age, he was selected for the Latvia men's national ice hockey team at the 1932 European Ice Hockey Championship.

In 1938, Hviid founded the ice hockey team within the Kjøbenhavns Skøjteløberforening in Copenhagen. Playing alongside his brothers, the team became Danish ice hockey league champions in the 1956 season. Hviid served as captain of the Denmark men's national ice hockey team, in its first international tournament at the 1949 World Ice Hockey Championships in Stockholm. He scored all four of his team's goals in the championship, and was teammates with his brother Erik. Despite Hviid's scoring, Denmark lost 0–47 to Canada in its first game, and lost 1–25 to Austria in its second game, and 3–8 to Belgium in its third game. Denmark withdrew from the championships without playing its fourth and fifth games to illnesses. At the time, newspapers in Denmark did not mention the first attempt by a Danish national team at the world championships.

Hviid retired from playing hockey after the 1961 season, when he skated alongside his son and won a Danish ice hockey league championship. As a coach, Hviid focused on skill development, and trained players to be powerful skaters. He later became a member of the Danish Ice Hockey Union in 1982, and then served on its board of directors from 1988 to 2001.

== Naval service ==
Hviid became an officer in the Royal Danish Navy in the autumn of 1939 in Copenhagen. During the occupation of Denmark in World War II, he served in the Danish resistance movement with the Danish Brigade in Sweden, where he trained with the Swedish Navy and then led a Danish flotilla in Karlskrona. He later achieved the rank of Commander (Danish: Kommandørkaptajn).

After the war ended he was in charge of minesweepers and reconnaissance, then held defence posts at the Holmen Naval Base, Langeland, Bornholm, Stockholm and Helsinki. He later captained the HDMY Dannebrog. He was named the Navy's sports officer and sat on the International Military Sports Council. In 1961, Hviid was a maritime advisor in the filming of Black Shara: Alarm in the Baltic Sea.

== Personal life ==
Hviid married Ellen Schmidt on 23 June 1941, in Birkerød Church. The couple had two sons, Torsten and Jesper, who later played on the Danish national team at the 1962 Ice Hockey World Championships in Colorado Springs, Colorado.

Hviid later acted as the head of the Danish Olympic sailing team in Tallinn, for sailing at the 1980 Summer Olympics. He died in Helsingør, on 5 September 2001 at age 85.

== Posthumous honours ==
Hviid was posthumously inducted into the IIHF Hall of Fame as a builder in 2005. He was made a member of the Danish Ice Hockey Hall of Fame in 2014, and is an honorary member of the Danish Ice Hockey Union.
