= 1988–89 Eliteserien (Denmark) season =

Danish ice hockey league season

The 1988–89 Eliteserien season was the 32nd season of ice hockey in Denmark. Seven teams participated in the league, and Frederikshavn IK won the championship.

== Regular season ==
	Club	GP	W	T	L	GF	GA	Pts
1.	Frederikshavn IK	24	14	4	6	110	86	32
2.	AaB Ishockey	24	11	6	7	105	84	28
3.	Herning IK	24	11	4	9	107	100	26
4.	Herlev IK	24	10	3	11	91	83	23
5.	Esbjerg IK	24	10	3	11	87	90	23
6.	Hellerup IK	24	7	5	12	79	117	19
7.	Rødovre Mighty Bulls	24	7	3	14	81	100	17

== Playoffs ==
The top 4 teams from the regular season qualified for the playoffs. Frederikshavn IK defeated AaB Ishockey in the final, and Herning IK defeated Herlev IK in the 3rd place game.
