= 1989–90 Eliteserien (Denmark) season =

Ice hockey season

The 1989–90 Eliteserien season was the 33rd season of ice hockey in Denmark. Eight teams participated in the league, and the Rødovre Mighty Bulls won the championship. Vojens IK was relegated to the 1. division.

== Regular season ==
	Club	GP	W	T	L	GF	GA	Pts
1.	Rødovre Mighty Bulls	28	22	0	6	142	94	44
2.	Herning IK	28	18	1	9	166	94	37
3.	Frederikshavn White Hawks	28	17	1	10	142	82	35
4.	Hellerup IK	28	14	3	11	124	96	31
5.	Herlev IK	28	13	2	13	127	114	28
6.	Esbjerg IK	28	12	3	13	123	123	27
7.	AaB Ishockey	28	10	0	18	120	148	20
8.	Vojens IK	28	1	0	27	55	248	2

== Playoffs ==
The top 4 teams from the regular season qualified for the playoffs. The Rødovre Mighty Bulls defeated Herning IK in the final, and the Frederikshavn White Hawks defeated Hellerup IK in the 3rd place game.
