= Frans Nielsen =

Danish ice hockey player (born 1984)

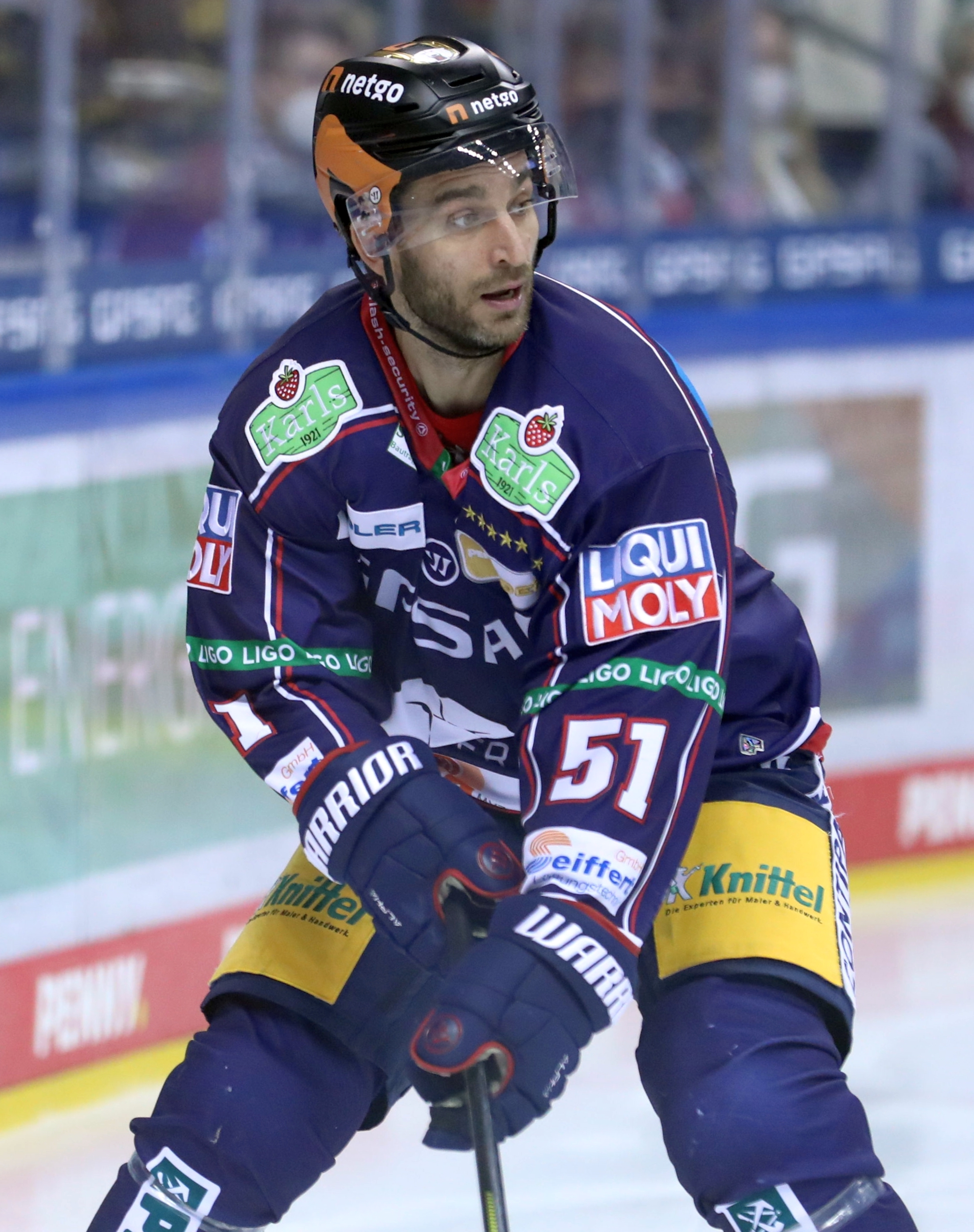
- Nielsen with the Eisbären Berlin in 2021
- Born: 24 April 1984 (age 42) Herning, Denmark
- Height: 6 ft 1 in (185 cm)
- Weight: 180 lb (82 kg; 12 st 12 lb)
- Position: Centre
- Shot: Left
- Played for: Herning Blue Fox; Malmö Redhawks; Timrå IK; New York Islanders; Lukko; Detroit Red Wings; Eisbären Berlin
- National team: Denmark
- NHL draft: 87th overall, 2002; New York Islanders
- Playing career: 2001–2022

Frans Nielsen (born 24 April 1984) is a Danish former professional ice hockey forward who played with the New York Islanders and Detroit Red Wings in the National Hockey League (NHL). Nielsen was the first Danish citizen to play in the NHL. Internationally, he played for the Denmark men's national team and was inducted into the IIHF Hall of Fame.

== Playing career ==
Nielsen was drafted by the New York Islanders in the third round, 87th overall in the 2002 NHL entry draft. After playing in the Swedish Elitserien since 2001, Nielsen signed a two-year contract with the New York Islanders on 15 May 2006. He has also played for the Danish national team.

With over 216 games in the Elitserien, Nielsen recorded 25 goals and 34 assists for 59 points and 66 penalty minutes.

Nielsen started the 2006–07 AHL season with the Islanders' affiliate, the Bridgeport Sound Tigers, and was recalled to the Islanders on 5 January 2007. He made his NHL debut on 6 January. At the time of his recall, he had recorded a point in nine consecutive American Hockey League (AHL) games, which was three games shy of the Sound Tigers' club record.

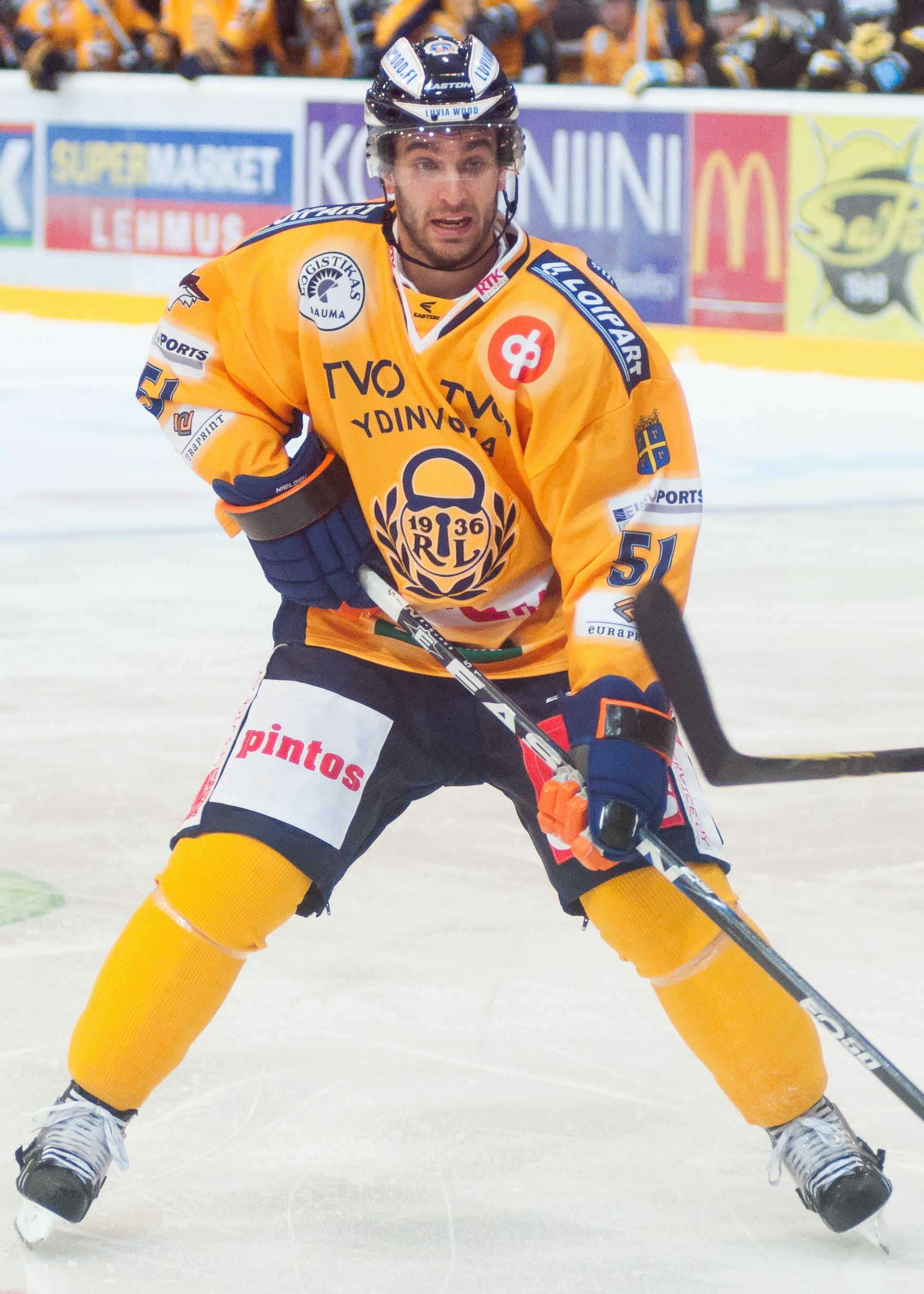
Nielsen with Lukko in 2012

During the 2010–11 NHL season, Nielsen scored a league-leading seven short-handed goals, including two penalty shot goals in three-on-five shorthanded situations. Near the end of the 2010–11 NHL season, Islanders' Captain Doug Weight was quoted as saying of Nielsen, "He’s our best all-around player even though his stats don’t necessarily show it". On 7 February 2012, Nielsen signed a four-year, $11 million contract with the Islanders.

Nielsen was very successful in shootouts; he even scored a goal in a shootout before being credited with his first official NHL goal. His signature move in the competition has been dubbed the "Danish Backhand of Judgement", though he has also scored using his forehand. He ended his NHL career with a success rate of 46.23% (49 goals from 106 attempts).

On 25 October 2014, he recorded his first career NHL hat trick against Anders Lindbäck of the Dallas Stars by scoring all three goals in the third period.

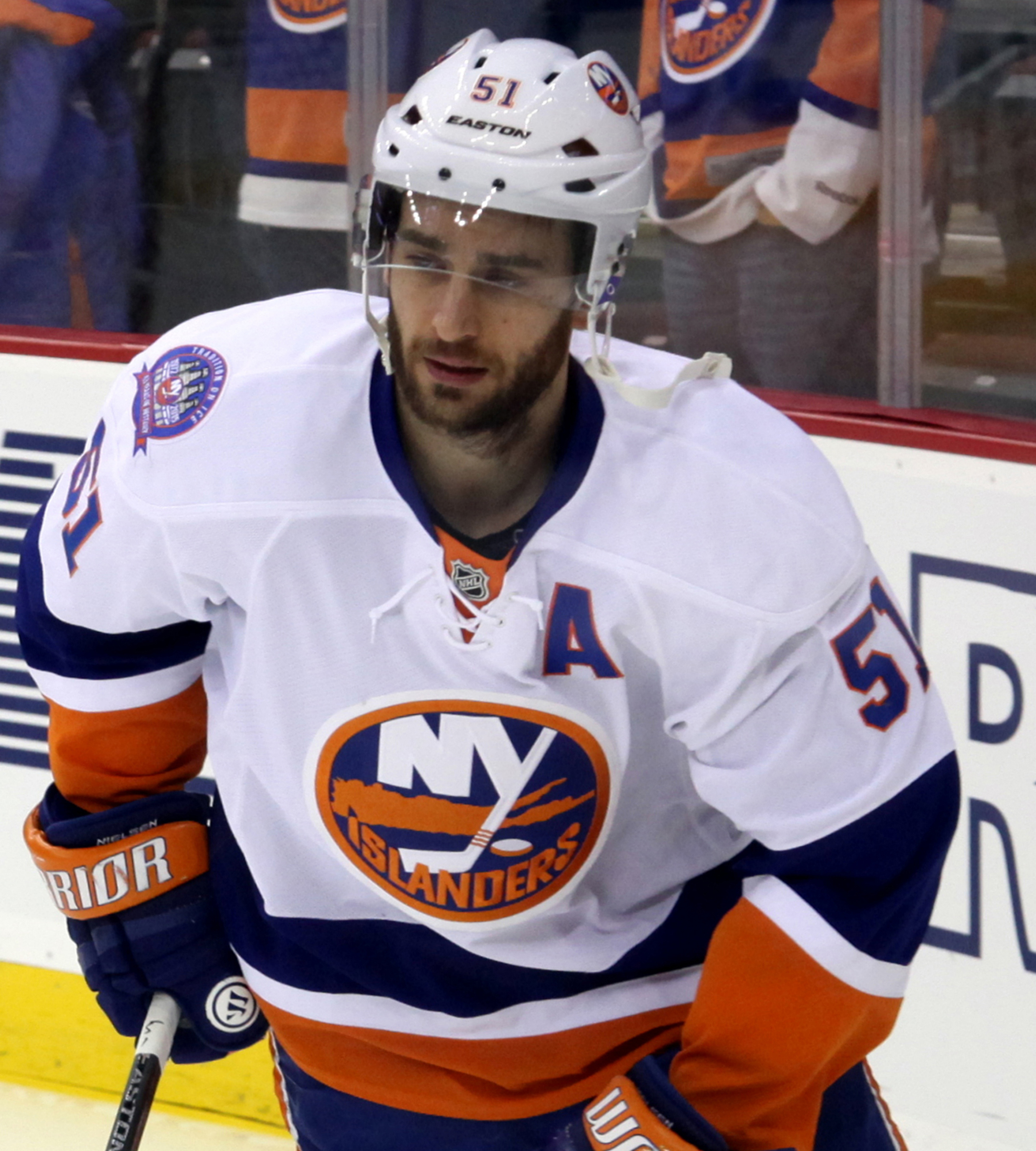
Nielsen with the New York Islanders in 2015

On 1 July 2016, Nielsen signed as a free agent to a six-year, $31.5 million contract with the Detroit Red Wings, marking the end of his 10-year tenure with the Islanders. During the 2016–17 season Nielsen was selected to participate in the 2017 NHL All-Star Game.

In the following 2017–18 season, Nielsen scored his 47th shootout goal, making him the all-time leader in shootout goals. The goal came against the New York Rangers in a 3–2 win on 29 December 2017.

At the conclusion of the 2020–21 season with the rebuilding Red Wings, having regressed offensively with just one goal and six points through 29 regular season games, Nielsen was bought out of the remaining year of his $5.25 million annual salary on 19 August 2021, releasing him to free agency.

Unsigned leading into the 2021–22 season, Nielsen signaled the conclusion of his NHL career, returning to Europe and agreeing to a one-year contract with German club Eisbären Berlin of the Deutsche Eishockey Liga (DEL), on 10 October 2021. In his last professional season, Nielsen was instrumental in providing veteran leadership to Berlin, posting 12 goals and 27 points through 33 regular season games. He added seven points in 12 playoff games to help Eisbären Berlin defend its DEL championship.

== International play ==
Nielsen represented Denmark fourteen times at the senior level. In 2002, he made his senior debut when Denmark was promoted to the IIHF elite division.

Nielsen represented Team Europe at the 2016 World Cup of Hockey, where he recorded two assists in six games and won a silver medal.

Nielsen was part of the Danish roster to qualify for their first Olympic appearance in 2022 in Beijing, China. During the 2022 Winter Olympics opening ceremony, Nielsen, along with curler Madeleine Dupont, served as flag bearers for Denmark. Nielsen appeared in all five games at the tournament, posting two goals and 3 points in a 7th place finish for Denmark.

Nielsen retired from professional ice hockey after the Danish elimination from the 2022 IIHF World Championship, following a 1-7 defeat to Slovakia. In the tournament, Danes were eliminated despite collecting historic 12 points in the group stage.

Nielsen was inducted into the IIHF Hall of Fame as part of their 2025 class, the third inductee from Denmark, after Jesper Damgaard and Jørgen Hviid.

== Career statistics ==
=== Regular season and playoffs ===
			Regular season					Playoffs
Season	Team	League	GP	G	A	Pts	PIM	GP	G	A	Pts	PIM
1999–2000	Herning Blue Fox	DEN U20	36	18	16	34	6	—	—	—	—	—
2000–01	Herning Blue Fox	DEN	38	18	19	37	6	—	—	—	—	—
2001–02	MIF Redhawks	J20	29	15	27	42	8	7	3	7	10	2
2001–02	MIF Redhawks	SEL	20	0	1	1	0	—	—	—	—	—
2002–03	MIF Redhawks	J20	2	1	3	4	0	6	5	4	9	6
2002–03	MIF Redhawks	SEL	47	3	6	9	10	—	—	—	—	—
2003–04	MIF Redhawks	SEL	50	9	7	16	28	—	—	—	—	—
2004–05	Malmö Redhawks	SEL	49	8	7	15	6	—	—	—	—	—
2005–06	Timrå IK	SEL	50	5	13	18	22	—	—	—	—	—
2006–07	New York Islanders	NHL	15	1	1	2	0	—	—	—	—	—
2006–07	Bridgeport Sound Tigers	AHL	54	20	24	44	10	—	—	—	—	—
2007–08	New York Islanders	NHL	16	2	1	3	0	—	—	—	—	—
2007–08	Bridgeport Sound Tigers	AHL	48	10	28	38	18	—	—	—	—	—
2008–09	New York Islanders	NHL	59	9	24	33	18	—	—	—	—	—
2009–10	New York Islanders	NHL	76	12	26	38	6	—	—	—	—	—
2010–11	New York Islanders	NHL	71	13	31	44	38	—	—	—	—	—
2011–12	New York Islanders	NHL	82	17	30	47	6	—	—	—	—	—
2012–13	Lukko	SM-l	27	4	20	24	10	—	—	—	—	—
2012–13	New York Islanders	NHL	48	6	23	29	12	6	0	2	2	0
2013–14	New York Islanders	NHL	80	25	33	58	8	—	—	—	—	—
2014–15	New York Islanders	NHL	78	14	29	43	12	7	1	1	2	0
2015–16	New York Islanders	NHL	81	20	32	52	12	11	3	3	6	2
2016–17	Detroit Red Wings	NHL	79	17	24	41	18	—	—	—	—	—
2017–18	Detroit Red Wings	NHL	79	16	17	33	14	—	—	—	—	—
2018–19	Detroit Red Wings	NHL	72	10	25	35	14	—	—	—	—	—
2019–20	Detroit Red Wings	NHL	60	4	5	9	8	—	—	—	—	—
2020–21	Detroit Red Wings	NHL	29	1	5	6	0	—	—	—	—	—
2021–22	Eisbären Berlin	DEL	33	12	15	27	6	12	4	3	7	4
SHL totals			216	25	34	59	66	—	—	—	—	—
NHL totals			925	167	306	473	166	24	4	6	10	2

=== International ===
Year	Team	Event	Result	GP	G	A	Pts	PIM
2000	Denmark	WJC18 B	5th	5	3	4	7	0
2001	Denmark	WJC18 D1	7th	3	2	1	3	0
2001	Denmark	WJC D2	4th	4	2	2	4	2
2002	Denmark	WJC18 D1	6th	3	1	2	3	0
2002	Denmark	WJC D2	2nd	4	4	10	14	0
2002	Denmark	WC D1	2nd	5	1	1	2	0
2003	Denmark	WJC D1	8th	5	3	7	10	0
2003	Denmark	WC	11th	6	0	0	0	4
2004	Denmark	WJC D1	3rd	5	8	3	11	4
2004	Denmark	WC	12th	6	0	3	3	0
2005	Denmark	OGQ	DNQ	3	2	3	5	0
2005	Denmark	WC	14th	6	3	0	3	0
2006	Denmark	WC	13th	6	3	0	3	4
2007	Denmark	WC	10th	6	0	3	3	6
2010	Denmark	WC	8th	7	2	3	5	6
2012	Denmark	WC	13th	7	0	3	3	8
2016	Denmark	OGQ	DNQ	3	0	3	3	0
2016	Team Europe	WCH	2nd	6	0	2	2	0
2018	Denmark	WC	10th	7	3	3	6	0
2021	Denmark	OGQ	Q	3	0	3	3	0
2022	Denmark	OG	7th	5	2	1	3	0
2022	Denmark	WC	9th	7	0	0	0	0
Junior totals				29	23	29	52	6
Senior totals				83	16	28	44	28

== Awards and honours ==
Award	Year	Ref
Metal Ligaen
Rookie of the Year	2001	
Champion	2001	
NHL
NHL All-Star Game	2017	
Bob Nystrom Award	2011	
DEL
Champion	2022	
International
IIHF Hall of Fame	2025	
