= 1955–56 Danish Ice Hockey Championship season =

The 1955–56 Danish Ice Hockey Championship season was the second season of ice hockey in Denmark. KSF Copenhagen won the championship by defeating Rungsted IK in the final.

== Jütland Regional Tournament ==
Teams

- Silkeborg SF
- Esbjerg SK
- Herning IK
- Horsens SF
- Viborg SF

Silkeborg SF qualified with four wins against the other teams and a goal difference of 28:9.

== Final ==
Due to logistical problems Silkeborg SF did not participate in the final tournament. That left two teams, KSF Copenhagen and Rungsted IK, left to play in the finals. The final was held on a frozen-over tennis court in Hørsholm. Ice conditions were poor due to recent warm temperatures, so KSF Copenhagen initially proposed to play the game as a friendly only. This proposal was rejected by Rungsted IK.

- KSF Copenhagen - Rungsted IK 4:1
