= 1986–87 Eliteserien (Denmark) season =

Danish ice hockey league season

The 1986–87 Eliteserien season was the 30th season of ice hockey in Denmark. Seven teams participated in the league, and Herning IK won the championship. Vojens IK was relegated to the 1. division.

== First round ==
	Club	GP	W	T	L	GF	GA	Pts
1.	Herning IK	24	13	4	7	128	89	30
2.	AaB Ishockey	24	14	2	8	103	94	30
3.	Rødovre Mighty Bulls	24	11	7	6	89	84	29
4.	Frederikshavn White Hawks	24	11	6	7	111	91	28
5.	Esbjerg IK	24	13	0	11	116	105	26
6.	Herlev IK	24	6	4	14	81	115	16
7.	Vojens IK	24	3	3	18	78	128	9

== Final round ==
The top four teams from the first round qualified for the final round. Herning IK finished first in the final round.
