= 1959–60 Danish Ice Hockey Championship season =

The 1959–60 Danish Ice Hockey Championship season was the third season of ice hockey in Denmark. Three teams participated in the final tournament, and KSF Copenhagen won the championship.

== Jütland Regional Tournament ==
Teams

- Silkeborg SF
- Rungsted IK

Silkeborg SF qualified for the final tournament.

== Final tournament ==
=== Semifinal ===
- Rungsted IK - Silkeborg SF 17:1

=== Final ===
- KSF Copenhagen - Rungsted IK 6:5
