= Riekkinen =

Riekkinen is a Finnish surname. Notable people with the surname include:

- Joona Riekkinen (born 1999), Finnish ice hockey player
- Joonas Riekkinen (born 1987), Finnish ice hockey player
