= 1987–88 Eliteserien (Denmark) season =

Danish ice hockey league season

The 1987–88 Eliteserien season was the 31st season of ice hockey in Denmark. Seven teams participated in the league, and Esbjerg IK won the championship. Gladsaxe SF was relegated to the 1. division.

== First round ==
	Club	GP	W	T	L	GF	GA	Pts
1.	Esbjerg IK	24	18	1	5	152	89	37
2.	AaB Ishockey	24	14	3	7	117	94	31
3.	Frederikshavn White Hawks	24	11	2	11	105	106	24
4.	Herlev IK	24	10	3	11	105	93	23
5.	Herning IK	24	8	7	9	108	115	23
6.	Rødovre Mighty Bulls	24	6	4	14	70	112	16
7.	Gladsaxe SF	24	5	4	15	87	135	14

== Final round ==
The top 4 teams from the first round qualified for the final round. Esbjerg IK finished first in the final round.
