= 1960–61 Danish 1. division season =

Danish ice hockey season

The 1960–61 Danish 1. division season was the fourth season of ice hockey in Denmark, and the first season of the Danish 1. division. Four teams participated in the league, and KSF Copenhagen won the championship.

== Regular season ==
	Club	GP	W	T	L	GF	GA	Pts
1.	KSF Copenhagen	6	6	0	0	82	8	12
2.	Rungsted IK	6	4	0	2	64	23	8
3.	Esbjerg SK	6	2	0	4	29	38	4
4.	Silkeborg SF	6	0	0	6	6	112	0

== Relegation ==
- Furesø - Horsens SF 22:0
- Furesø - Silkeborg SF 6:1

Silkeborg SF was relegated to the 2. division, and Furesø was promoted to the 1. division for the 1961–62 season.
