= Bent Hansen =

Bent Hansen may refer to:

- Bent Hansen (footballer) (1933–2001), Danish footballer
- Bent Hansen (ice hockey) (born 1954), Danish ice hockey forward
- Bent Hansen (cyclist) (born 1932), Danish cyclist
