= Henry From =

Danish footballer (1926–1990)

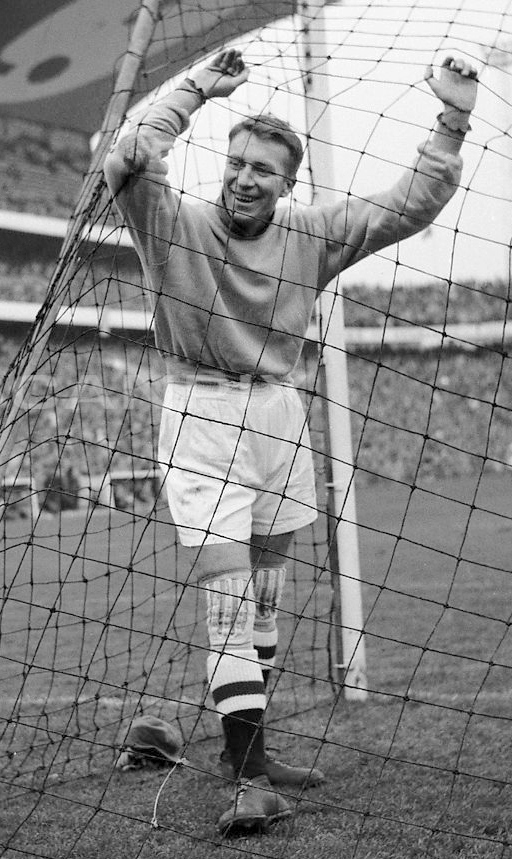
- Henry From in 1957

Personal information
- Full name: Henry Petersen From
- Date of birth: 1 June 1926
- Place of birth: Aarhus, Denmark
- Date of death: 31 August 1990 (aged 64)
- Place of death: Aarhus, Denmark
- Height: 1.83 m (6 ft 0 in)
- Position: Goalkeeper

Senior career*
Years	Team	Apps	(Gls)
1948–61	AGF	277	(0)

International career
1951	Denmark u-21	3	(0)
1957–1961	Denmark	31	(0)

Managerial career
- 1965–1966: AGF
- 1967–1969: Denmark
- 1975: AGF
Medal record
Representing Denmark
Olympic Games
Silver medal – second place	1960 Rome	Team competition
- * Club domestic league appearances and goals

Henry Petersen From (1 June 1926 – 31 August 1990) was a Danish association football goalkeeper. He played 31 games for the Denmark national football team, and won a silver medal at the 1960 Summer Olympics. He spent his entire club career at AGF Aarhus, with whom he won four Danish football championships and four Danish Cups, and is considered a club legend. He was included in the Danish Football Hall of Fame in 2015.

== Biography ==
Born in Aarhus, From grew up on Frederiksbjerg. His father died when he was just one year old.

He started playing football with Aarhus Gymnastik Forening (AGF) from he was 10, and he played for them his entire career. He was a reserve goalkeeper at the 1952 Summer Olympics, but did not play there. From was a stalwart goalkeeper in the AGF team which won the Danish championship three consecutive seasons (1955 to 1957), as well as the 1955 and 1957 Danish Cup trophies. In the 1955–56 European Cup he was part of the AGF team that played its first ever European matches against Stade Reims. He made his debut on the Denmark national team in May 1957 at the age of 31 in a friendly against Bulgaria, and quickly established himself as Denmark's leading goalkeeper.

From was the starting goalkeeper when Denmark won silver medals at the 1960 Olympic football tournament. In the semi-finals against Hungary, Denmark were leading 1–0 when Hungary were awarded a penalty kick. As he readied himself for the penalty kick, From spat his chewing gum out, and stuck it to the goalpost. He saved Hungarian player Pal Varhidi's shot, took the chewing gum in his mouth again, and Denmark went on to win the game 2–0.

From won a third Danish championship with AGF in 1960, as well as two further Danish Cup trophies in 1960 and 1961. On the international stage, he helped AGF reach the quarter-finals of the 1961 European Cup, where they were defeated by S.L. Benfica from Portugal. He played his last Denmark national team game in May 1961, before ending his national team career after 31 games.

From became the head coach of AGF for a single season in 1965-66 and again in 1975. From 1968 to 1969, From was the coach of the Denmark national team in 20 games. He collaborated with Erik Hansen, and later John Hansen. From was the coach, while the two others alternated as team managers.

Besides football, From worked for Danish State Railways. He died 31 August 1990, and is buried at Vestre Kirkegård in Aarhus.

== Bibliography ==
- "From klarer", memoirs (1961)
