= 2000–01 Codan Ligaen season =

Danish ice hockey league season

The 2000–01 Codan Ligaen season was the 44th season of ice hockey in Denmark. Nine teams participated in the league, and the Herning Blue Fox won the championship.

== First round ==
	Club	GP	W	OTW	T	OTL	L	GF	GA	Pts
1.	Herning Blue Fox	32	22	3	0	0	7	159	88	50
2.	Esbjerg IK	32	21	1	1	2	7	131	74	47
3.	Rungsted IK	32	17	2	3	2	8	131	101	43
4.	Vojens IK	32	13	1	3	2	13	102	117	33
5.	Rødovre Mighty Bulls	32	13	1	3	2	13	129	120	33
6.	Frederikshavn White Hawks	32	13	1	3	0	15	104	110	31
7.	Odense Bulldogs	32	8	2	2	3	17	106	124	25
8.	AaB Ishockey	32	8	0	2	2	20	69	115	20
9.	Herlev Hornets	32	6	2	3	0	21	91	173	19

== Zweite Saisonphase ==
=== Group A ===
	Club	GP	W	T	L	GF	GA	Pts (Bonus)
1.	Herning Blue Fox	6	4	0	2	33	13	10(2)
2.	Rødovre Mighty Bulls	6	4	1	1	23	16	9(0)
3.	AaB Ishockey	6	2	0	4	16	22	4(0)
4.	Vojens IK	6	1	1	4	17	38	4(1)

=== Group B ===
	Club	GP	W	T	L	GF	GA	Pts (Bonus)
1.	Rungsted IK	6	3	3	0	20	15	10(1)
2.	Esbjerg IK	6	2	2	2	19	19	8(2)
3.	Frederikshavn White Hawks	6	2	3	1	17	13	7(0)
4.	Odense Bulldogs	6	1	0	5	18	27	2(0)

== Playoffs ==
=== 3rd place ===
- Esbjerg IK - Rungsted IK 2:1 (4:3 n.P., 4:8, 3:0)

=== Final ===
- Herning Blue Fox - Rødovre Mighty Bulls 3:1 (4:1, 4:5 n.P., 7:5, 3:0)
