= Danish Cup (ice hockey) =

The Danish Cup (also known as the Metal Final4) is the national ice hockey cup in Denmark. It was first played in the 1988-89 season.

== Champions ==
- 2023-24: SønderjyskE Ishockey
- 2022-23: Herning Blue Fox
- 2021-22: Aalborg Pirates
- 2020-21: SønderjyskE Ishockey
- 2019-20: Frederikshavn White Hawks
- 2018-19: Rungsted Seier Capital
- 2017-18: Aalborg Pirates
- 2016-17: Rungsted Seier Capital
- 2015-16: Odense Bulldogs
- 2014-15: Herning Blue Fox
- 2013-14: Aalborg Pirates
- 2012-13: SønderjyskE Ishockey
- 2011-12: Herning Blue Fox
- 2010-11: SønderjyskE Ishockey
- 2009-10: SønderjyskE Ishockey
- 2008-09: Odense Bulldogs
- 2007-08: Rødovre Mighty Bulls
- 2006-07: Aalborg Pirates
- 2005-06: Odense Bulldogs
- 2004-05: Rungsted Seier Capital
- 2003-04: Rungsted Seier Capital
- 2002-03: Odense Bulldogs
- 2001-02: Frederikshavn White Hawks
- 2000-01: not contested
- 1999-2000: Rungsted Seier Capital
- 1998-99: Frederikshavn White Hawks
- 1997-98: Herning Blue Fox
- 1996-97: not contested
- 1995-96: Herning Blue Fox
- 1994-95: not contested
- 1993-94: Herning Blue Fox
- 1992-93: Esbjerg IK
- 1991-92: Esbjerg IK
- 1990-91: Herning Blue Fox
- 1989-90: not contested
- 1988-89: Esbjerg IK
