= Bent Hansen (ice hockey) =

Danish ice hockey player

- Born: 13 August 1954 (age 71) Copenhagen, Denmark
- Position: Forward
- Shot: Right
- Played for: DEN; Rødovre Mighty Bulls; KSF
- National team: Denmark
- NHL draft: Undrafted
- Playing career: 1969–1987

Bent Hansen (born 13 August 1954) is a Danish retired ice hockey forward. He played for 18 years in Denmark for the Rødovre SIK and KSF. He also competed for the Danish national team. His son, Jannik Hansen, also played for the Rødovre team as well as the San Jose Sharks and the Vancouver Canucks of the NHL. During his hockey career, Hansen also worked as a carpenter.
