= Joonas Riekkinen =

Finnish ice hockey player

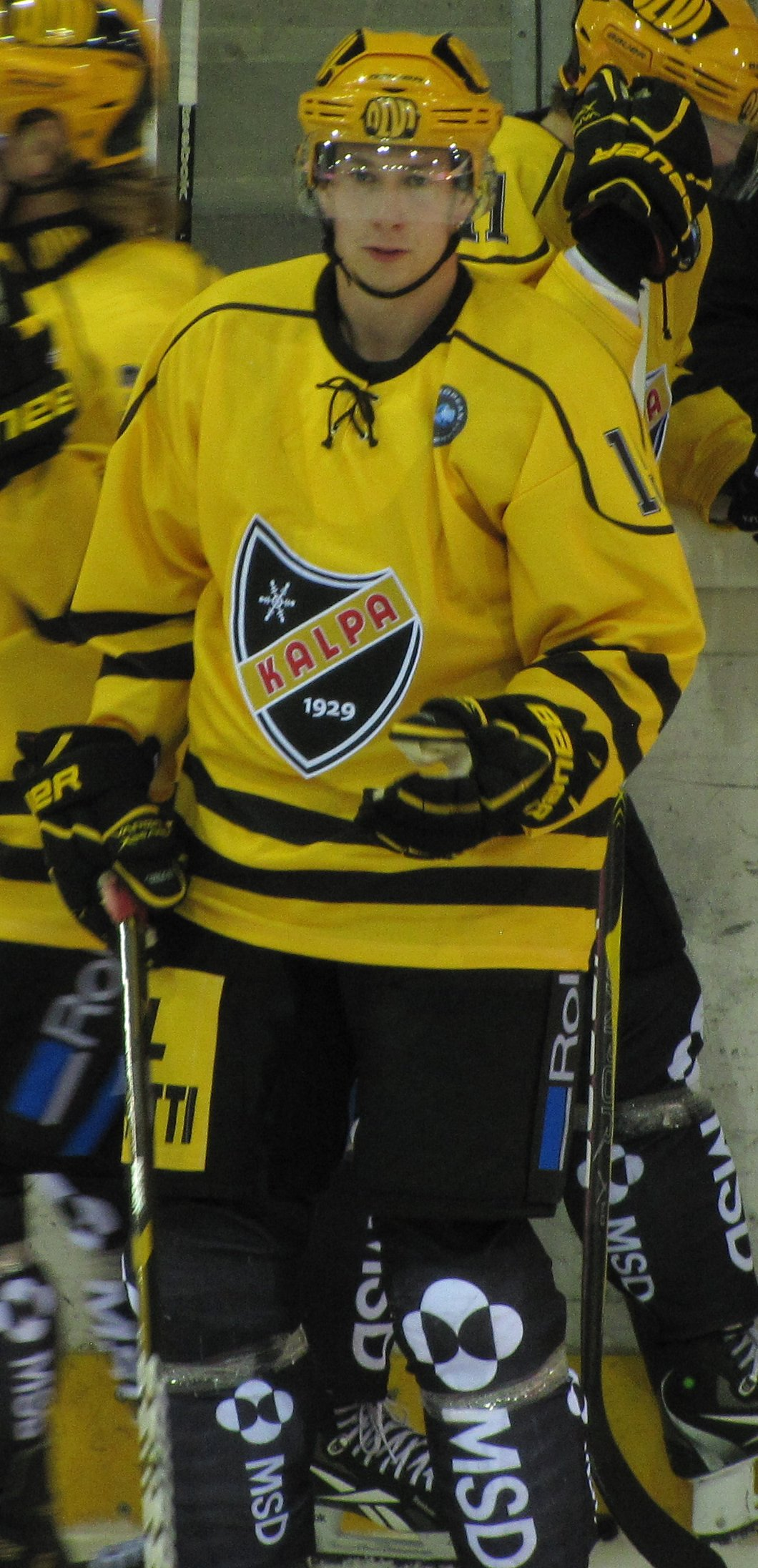
- Born: August 11, 1987 (age 38) Varpaisjärvi, Finland
- Height: 6 ft 0 in (183 cm)
- Weight: 196 lb (89 kg; 14 st 0 lb)
- Position: Center
- Shoots: Left
- Metal Ligaen team Former teams: Herlev Eagles; KalPa; Ilves; Gentofte Stars; Hvidovre Ligahockey; Herning Blue Fox
- Playing career: 2007–present

Joonas Riekkinen (born August 11, 1987) is a Finnish professional ice hockey player who currently plays for the Herlev Eagles of the Metal Ligaen in Denmark.

Riekkinen signed a two-year contract with Ilves on April 24, 2014. He had previously spent the entirety of his playing career as a youth and professional within KalPa of the Liiga.
