= Juuso Walli =

Finnish ice hockey defenceman

- Born: July 3, 1996 (age 29) Tampere, Finland
- Height: 6 ft 5 in (196 cm)
- Weight: 234 lb (106 kg; 16 st 10 lb)
- Position: Defence
- Shoots: Left
- Liiga team: Ässät
- Playing career: 2015–present

Juuso Walli (born July 3, 1996) is a Finnish professional ice hockey defenceman playing for Ässät of Liiga.

Walli made his Liiga debut for Ässät during the 2015–16 season and played 94 games for the team until 2018. He had a loan spell with SaPKo of Mestis in the 2016–17 season, winning the league championship with the team.

Walli joined Iisalmen Peli-Karhut in December 2018 on a three-game contract before finishing the season with KOOVEE. On May 28, 2019, Walli returned to SaPKo.

On July 31, 2020, Walli re-joined Ässät after a two-year absence.
