= Joona Riekkinen =

Finnish ice hockey player

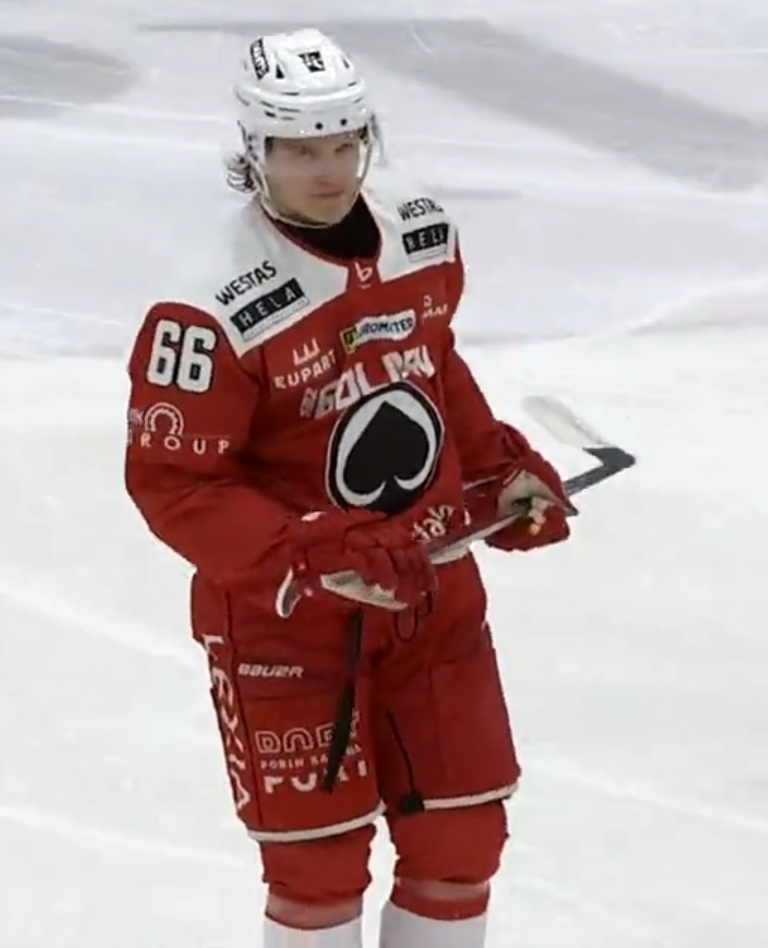
- Born: March 5, 1999 (age 27) Kuopio, Finland
- Height: 6 ft 0 in (183 cm)
- Weight: 192 lb (87 kg; 13 st 10 lb)
- Position: Defence
- Shoots: Left
- Liiga team Former teams: Ässät; KalPa
- Playing career: 2017–present

Joona Riekkinen (born March 5, 1999) is a Finnish professional ice hockey defenceman currently playing for Ässät of the Finnish Liiga.

Riekkinen made his Liiga debut with KalPa on October 13, 2017, against KooKoo, his only game of the 2017–18 Liiga season. He then played thirteen games during the 2018–19 Liiga season and scored his first goal on October 10, 2018, against SaiPa.
