= Metal Ligaen =

Top Danish men's ice hockey league

- Current season, competition or edition: 2024–25 Metal Ligaen season
- Sport: Ice hockey
- Founded: 1954; 72 years ago
- No. of teams: 9
- Country: Denmark
- Most recent champion: SønderjyskE Ishockey (7)
- Most titles: Herning (16)
- Broadcaster: TV2 Sport
- Related competitions: Danish Division 1 Danish Cup
- Website: metalligaen.dk

The Superisligaen, known as the Metal Ligaen for sponsorship reasons, is the highest-level ice hockey league in Denmark. The league consists of 9 professional teams.

Teams from the Superisligaen can participate in the IIHF's annual Champions Hockey League (CHL), competing for the European Trophy. Participation is based on the strength of the various leagues in Europe (excluding the European/Asian Kontinental Hockey League). Going into the 2022–23 CHL season, the Superisligaen was ranked the No. 13 league in Europe, allowing them to send their top team to compete in the CHL.

== History ==
The Danish ice hockey league has become a springboard for foreign players and a place to start their European careers, before traveling to other bigger leagues such as the Swedish Hockey League or DEL. The teams rely mostly on foreign talent, but there are still a lot of skilled professional Danish players. Mostly the older Danish players are full-time professional. Most younger players are semi-professional because of the tight economy in Danish hockey, and most of the money is spent on more talented foreign players.

In the past, the league has consisted of as many as 10 teams. Despite the introduction of a salary cap as well as a limit to the number of import players allowed, several teams have struggled financially in recent years. As a result, the Herlev Hornets and the Rungsted Cobras have withdrawn from the league, reducing the number of active teams from ten to eight. Teams from the second-tier league were offered the empty spots, but no team were able to accept the offer, citing financial issues as their main concern.

On 9 January 2015 TV2 Sport debuted as a new sports channel on Danish TV. Same day, HockeyNight also aired for the first time, with a match between Odense Bulldogs and Rungsted. Since 2015 TV2 Sport has been the place to watch icehockey and other sports.

On 18 June 2016, it was made clear that the foreign player limit of eight was against EU law and was therefore removed. The 2016–17 season was the first time, since 2009, that a Danish ice hockey team could have an unlimited number of foreign players. The salary cap was created to regulate the league, and was 6 million DKK for the 2016–17 season.

On 3 June 2017, Metal Ligaen was expanded once again, to an historic number of 11 teams. Hvidovre Fighters, who had previously left the league in 2013 because of bankruptcy, got their submitted papers approved, making them the 11th team of the 2017–18 season.

== League format ==
The league consists of 9 teams. The latest expansion was in 2014, when Gentofte Stars joined the league after being relegated in 1999. The league format has changed many times. The current structure was implemented in the 2011–12 season. Often it is changed depending on how many teams are represented in the league. There has never been more than 10 teams in the Danish ice hockey league, making it a fairly small league compared to other leagues in Europe.

The Danish hockey league is structured so that the teams meet five times, making the seasons after 2014 45 games long. The season typically starts in September and ends in February. The top eight teams of the regular season make the playoffs. First place gets to pick who they want to play in the quarterfinals. second place picks next and so on. The Metal Ligaen playoffs consists of three rounds: quarterfinals, semifinals, and the finals. The winner will raise The Prince Henrik's Cup.

As of the 2017–18 Metal Ligaen expansion, the Metal Ligaen regular season was extended from 45 games to a historic 50 games. The playoff format was also changed, where previously the top 8 teams made the playoffs. Now the top 6 teams advanced directly to the quarter-finals and teams ranking from 7 to 10 play for the last two wildcard spots.

=== Metal Cup ===
The Metal Cup is a tournament held every year. It consists of 12 teams, where all Metal Ligaen teams are represented. Two teams from the 1.division are also represented. The top 4 teams the year before will go straight to the quarter-finals. The 8 other teams will by draw be divided into 4 groups each one of them with a letter from A to D. 4 teams will advance on from first round to the quarter-finals. In the quarter-finals, the last season's champions will play the winner of group A, the second-placed winner of group B and so on. Games in the quarter-finals and semi-finals consists of two games. The winner of the tournament will receive the Metal Cup.

In 2017, the Metal Cup format was changed. Because of Hvidovre Fighters joining the league, the format would now only consist of teams from the Metal Ligaen and, instead of a playout format, the top 4 teams after 20 regular season games would be invited to a final four tournament.

== Names and sponsorship ==
The Danish Ice Hockey Union officially recognizes the league as the Superisligaen. Through the years, the naming rights of the league has been leased to a series of sponsors, resulting in numerous name changes.

| Period | Name | Sponsor |
|---|---|---|
| 1960–1998 | Superisligaen | none |
| 1998–2001 | Codan Ligaen | Codan A/S |
| 1998–2002 | Sanistål Ligaen | Sanistål A/S |
| 2002–2004 | SuperBest Ligaen | SuperBest |
| 2004–2007 | Oddset Ligaen | Danske Spil |
| 2007–2013 | AL-Bank Ligaen | Arbejdernes Landsbank |
| 2013–2014 (half-season) | Superisligaen | none |
| 2014– | Metal Ligaen | Danish Union of Metalworkers |

== Teams ==
Teams currently in the Metal Ligaen.

| Team | City | Founded | Arena | Capacity | Opened |
|---|---|---|---|---|---|
| Aalborg Pirates | Aalborg | 1967 | Sparekassen Danmark Isarena | 5000 | 2007 |
| Esbjerg Energy | Esbjerg | 1964 | Granly Hockey Arena | 4200 | 1976 |
| Frederikshavn White Hawks | Frederikshavn | 1964 | Nordjyske Bank Arena | 4000 | 2015 |
| Herning Blue Fox | Herning | 1947 | KVIK Hockey Arena | 4100 | 1988 |
| Herlev Eagles | Herlev | 1968 | PM Montage Arena | 1740 | 1977 |
| Odense Bulldogs | Odense | 1978 | Spar Nord Arena | 3280 | 1999 |
| Rungsted Seier Capital | Rungsted | 1941 | Concordium Arena | 2460 | 1971 |
| Rødovre Mighty Bulls | Rødovre | 1964 | Holger Danske Arena | 3600 | 1995 |
| SønderjyskE Ishockey | Vojens | 1963 | Sydjysk Sparekasse Arena | 5000 | 2011 |

== Notable players ==
List of notable players who have played in the Danish ice hockey league.

- Frederik Andersen
- Valeri Bragin (USSR)
- Robert Burakovsky (Sweden)
- Jannik Hansen
- Morten Madsen
- Frans Nielsen
- Peter Regin
- Kent Simpson (Canada)
- Juha Riihijärvi (Finland)
- Colin Greening (Canada)
- Petri Skriko (Finland)
- Todd Simpson (Canada)
- Kim Staal
- Kirill Starkov
- Oliver Bjorkstrand

== Danish Champions ==
| Season | Winner | Finalist | Bronze | Cup Champion |
| 1954–55 | Rungsted IK | KSF København | Silkeborg | not yet played |
| 1955–56 | KSF København | Rungsted IK | not played | not yet played |
| 1956–57 | not played | not played | not played | not yet played |
| 1957–58 | not played | not played | not played | not yet played |
| 1958–59 | not played | not played | not played | not yet played |
| 1959–60 | KSF København | Rungsted IK | Silkeborg | not yet played |
| 1960–61 | KSF København | Rungsted IK | Esbjerg IK | not yet played |
| 1961–62 | KSF København | Rungsted IK | not played | not yet played |
| 1962–63 | Rungsted IK | Esbjerg IK | KSF København | not yet played |
| 1963–64 | KSF København | Rungsted IK | Esbjerg IK | not yet played |
| 1964–65 | KSF København | Esbjerg IK | Gladsaxe SF | not yet played |
| 1965–66 | KSF København | Gladsaxe SF | Esbjerg IK | not yet played |
| 1966–67 | Gladsaxe SF | KSF København | Esbjerg IK | not yet played |
| 1967–68 | Gladsaxe SF | Esbjerg IK | Rungsted IK | not yet played |
| 1968–69 | Esbjerg IK | Gladsaxe SF | Vojens IK | not yet played |
| 1969–70 | KSF København | Gladsaxe SF | Esbjerg IK | not yet played |
| 1970–71 | Gladsaxe SF | Rungsted IK | Esbjerg IK and Vojens IK | not yet played |
| 1971–72 | KSF København | Esbjerg IK | Gladsaxe SF | not yet played |
| 1972–73 | Herning IK | KSF København | Esbjerg IK | not yet played |
| 1973–74 | Gladsaxe SF | no playoff | no playoff | not yet played |
| 1974–75 | Gladsaxe SF | no playoff | no playoff | not yet played |
| 1975–76 | KSF København | no playoff | no playoff | not yet played |
| 1976–77 | Herning IK | no playoff | no playoff | not yet played |
| 1977–78 | Rødovre SIK | KSF København | Vojens IK | not yet played |
| 1978–79 | Vojens IK | Rødovre SIK | Aalborg IK | not yet played |
| 1979–80 | Vojens IK | Rungsted IK | Aalborg IK | not yet played |
| 1980–81 | Aalborg IK | Rødovre SIK | Herning IK | not yet played |
| 1981–82 | Vojens IK | Rødovre SIK | Aalborg IK | not yet played |
| 1982–83 | Rødovre SIK | Aalborg IK | Herlev IK | not yet played |
| 1983–84 | Herlev IK | Aalborg IK | Rungsted IK | not yet played |
| 1984–85 | Rødovre SIK | no playoff | no playoff | not yet played |
| 1985–86 | Rødovre SIK | no playoff | no playoff | not yet played |
| 1986–87 | Herning IK | no playoff | no playoff | not yet played |
| 1987–88 | Esbjerg IK | no playoff | no playoff | not yet played |
| 1988–89 | Frederikshavn IK | Aalborg IK | Herning IK | Esbjerg IK |
| 1989–90 | Rødovre SIK | Herning IK | Frederikshavn IK | not played |
| 1990–91 | Herning IK | Rødovre SIK | Aalborg IK | Esbjerg IK |
| 1991–92 | Herning IK | Esbjerg IK | Rødovre SIK | Esbjerg IK |
| 1992–93 | Esbjerg IK | Herning IK | Rødovre SIK | Esbjerg IK |
| 1993–94 | Herning IK | Esbjerg IK | Aalborg IK | Herning IK |
| 1994–95 | Herning IK | Esbjerg IK | Rungsted IK | not played |
| 1995–96 | Esbjerg IK | Rungsted IK | Herning IK | Herning IK |
| 1996–97 | Herning IK | Esbjerg IK | Rungsted IK | not played |
| 1997–98 | Herning Blue Fox | Rungsted IK | Frederikshavn White Hawks | Herning Blue Fox |
| 1998–99 | Rødovre Mighty Bulls | Frederikshavn White Hawks | Esbjerg IK | Frederikshavn IK |
| 1999–2000 | Frederikshavn White Hawks | Herning Blue Fox | Esbjerg IK | Rungsted Cobras |
| 2000–01 | Herning Blue Fox | Esbjerg IK | Rødovre Mighty Bulls | not played |
| 2001–02 | Rungsted Cobras | Odense IK | Herning Blue Fox | Frederikshavn IK |
| 2002–03 | Herning Blue Fox | Odense IK | Rungsted Cobras | Odense IK |
| 2003–04 | Esbjerg Oilers | Aab Ishockey | Odense IK | Rungsted Cobras |
| 2004–05 | Herning Blue Fox | Aab Ishockey | Frederikshavn White Hawks | Nordsjælland Cobras |
| 2005–06 | SønderjyskE Ishockey | Aab Ishockey | Herning Blue Fox | Odense Bulldogs |
| 2006–07 | Herning Blue Fox | Aab Ishockey | SønderjyskE Ishockey | AaB Ishockey |
| 2007–08 | Herning Blue Fox | Frederikshavn White Hawks | SønderjyskE Ishockey | Rødovre Mighty Bulls |
| 2008–09 | SønderjyskE Ishockey | Herning Blue Fox | Rødovre Mighty Bulls | Odense Bulldogs |
| 2009–10 | SønderjyskE Ishockey | Aab Ishockey | Frederikshavn White Hawks | SønderjyskE Ishockey |
| 2010–11 | Herning Blue Fox | Frederikshavn White Hawks | SønderjyskE Ishockey | SønderjyskE Ishockey |
| 2011–12 | Herning Blue Fox | Odense Bulldogs | SønderjyskE Ishockey | Herning Blue Fox |
| 2012–13 | SønderjyskE Ishockey | Frederikshavn White Hawks | Rødovre Mighty Bulls | SønderjyskE Ishockey |
| 2013–14 | SønderjyskE Ishockey | Herning Blue Fox | Frederikshavn White Hawks | Herning Blue Fox |
| 2014–15 | SønderjyskE Ishockey | Esbjerg Energy | Frederikshavn White Hawks | Herning Blue Fox |
| 2015–16 | Esbjerg Energy | Herning Blue Fox | Frederikshavn White Hawks | Odense Bulldogs |
| 2016–17 | Esbjerg Energy | Gentofte Stars | Frederikshavn White Hawks | Rungsted Seier Capital |
| 2017–18 | Aalborg Pirates | Herning Blue Fox | Rungsted Seier Capital | Aalborg Pirates |
| 2018–19 | Rungsted Seier Capital | SønderjyskE Ishockey | Frederikshavn White Hawks | Rungsted Seier Capital |
| 2019–20 | Morale champions - Aalborg Pirates | Cancelled due to Covid19 | Cancelled due to Covid19 | Frederikshavn White Hawks |
| 2020–21 | Rungsted Seier Capital | Aalborg Pirates | Esbjerg Energy | SønderjyskE Ishockey |
| 2021–22 | Aalborg Pirates | Rungsted Seier Capital | Odense Bulldogs | Aalborg Pirates |
| 2022–23 | Aalborg Pirates | Herning Blue Fox | Herlev Eagles | Herning Blue Fox |
| 2023–24 | SønderjyskE Ishockey | Esbjerg Energy | Aalborg Pirates | SønderjyskE Ishockey |
| 2024-25 | Odense Bulldogs | Herning Blue Fox | Aalborg Pirates | Herning Blue Fox |
| 2025-26 | Herning Blue Fox | Herlev Eagles | Rungsted Seier Capital | Herning Blue Fox |

=== By club ===
| Club | Winners | Winning years |
|---|---|---|
| Herning Blue Fox (earlier known as Herning IK) | 17 | 1973, 1977, 1987, 1991, 1992, 1994, 1995, 1997, 1998, 2001, 2003, 2005, 2007, 2008, 2011, 2012, 2026 |
| KSF København | 10 | 1956, 1960, 1961, 1962, 1964, 1965, 1966, 1970, 1972, 1976 |
| SønderjyskE Ishockey (earlier known as Vojens IK) | 10 | 1979, 1980, 1982, 2006, 2009, 2010, 2013, 2014, 2015, 2024 |
| Esbjerg Energy (earlier known as Esbjerg Oilers and Esbjerg IK) | 7 | 1969, 1988, 1993, 1996, 2004, 2016, 2017 |
| Rødovre Mighty Bulls (earlier known as Rødovre SIK) | 6 | 1978, 1983, 1985, 1986, 1990, 1999 |
| Gladsaxe SF | 5 | 1967, 1968, 1971, 1974, 1975 |
| Rungsted Seier Capital (earlier known as Rungsted IK and Rungsted Cobras) | 5 | 1955, 1963, 2002, 2019, 2021 |
| Aalborg Pirates (earlier known as AAB Ishockey, Aalborg IK and AaB Ishockey) | 4 | 1981, 2018, 2022, 2023 |
| Frederikshavn White Hawks (earlier known as Frederikshavn IK) | 2 | 1989, 2000 |
| Herlev Hornets (earlier known as Herlev IK) | 1 | 1984 |
| Odense Bulldogs | 1 | 2025 |
