= Danish Division 1 =

Second-level men's ice hockey league in Denmark

- Sport: Ice hockey
- Founded: 1985
- No. of teams: 13
- Country: Denmark
- Most recent champion: Gentofte Stars (2018–19)
- Promotion to: Metal Ligaen
- Relegation to: Danish Division 2
- Related competitions: Danish Cup

Danish Division 1 (Danish: 1. division i ishockey or Divisionen) is the second-level professional men's ice hockey league in Denmark. It lies below the Metal Ligaen.

== Teams ==
=== 2020–21 season ===
West

- Aalborg (AaB)
- Esbjerg IK
- Frederikshavn IK
- Jutland Vikings
- Odense IK
- Vojens IK

East

- Gentofte Stars
- Gladsaxe Ishockey
- Herlev IK
- Hvidovre IK
- Rungsted IK
- Rødovre SIK
