= Gentofte Stars =

Danish 1. division ice hockey club in Gentofte

- City: Gentofte, Denmark
- League: 1. division i ishockey
- Division: Øst
- Founded: 23 April 1965 (as Hellerup IK); 1996 (as IC Gentofte)
- Home arena: Gentofte Skøjtehal
- Colours: Dark blue, orange, white
- Website: gentoftestars.dk

Franchise history
- 1965–1996: Hellerup IK
- 1996–2008: IC Gentofte
- 2008–present: IC Gentofte Stars

The Gentofte Stars are an ice hockey team in the 1. division i ishockey, the second-highest men’s ice hockey league in Denmark. They play in Gentofte, a northern suburb in the Copenhagen urban area, at the Gentofte Skøtjehal ('Gentofte Skating Arena'). The team previously played in the Metal Ligaen but was relegated in 2018 due to financial troubles.

The parent club, Icehockey Club Gentofte Stars, also has a representative women's ice hockey team (which previously played in the Danish Championship league from 2011 to 2016), active minor and junior ice hockey sections, and recreational teams for several age groups.

== History ==
The ice hockey section of the Hellerup IK sports club was founded on April 23, 1965. The club debuted in the AL-Bank Ligaen for the 1967–68 season. The ice hockey section of Hellerup IK participated regularly in the AL-Bank Ligaen for many years, before becoming independent in 1996 for financial reasons and rebranding as IC Gentofte. Before withdrawing due to financial issues, Gentofte participated in the AL-Bank Ligaen for three more years, in 1997, 1998, and 1999. The club qualified for the promotion/relegation round of the AL-Bank Ligaen in the 2000 and 2002 seasons but failed to earn a promotion to the league.

== Team roster ==
Updated July 3, 2024.

No.	Nat	Player	Pos	S/G	Age	Acquired	Birthplace
79	(Denmark)	Phillip Berg Nicolaisen	G	L	27		
30	(Denmark)	Adian Carlsen	G	L	29		Herlev, Denmark
1	(Finland)	Teemu Seppänen	G	L	39		Suomussalmi, Finland
4	(Denmark)	Anders Fisker	D	L	37		Rødovre, Denmark
61	(Finland)	Jesse Jyrkkiö	D	R	36		Hämeenlinna, Finland
8	(Finland)	Marlo Koponen	D	L	39		Imatra, Finland
40	(Denmark)	Christoffer Lindhøj	D	L	31		Virum, Denmark
13	(Denmark)	Victor Reese	D	L	27		Roskilde, Denmark
12	(Denmark)	Mikkel Grau Svenson	D		29		
27	(Canada)	Jeff Terminesi	D	L	39		Mississauga, Ontario, Canada
71	(Denmark)	Matthias Asperup	W	L	30		Rødovre, Denmark
21	(Denmark)	Mads Eller	F	L	30		Rødovre, Denmark
11	(Denmark)	Magnus Ferslew	C/RW		29		
22	(Denmark)	Christian Hee Foss	C	L	33		Gentofte, Denmark
78	(Denmark)	Nicki Kisum	W	L	32		Hvidovre, Denmark
26	(Denmark)	Jeppe Klitgaard	C	R	28		Gentofte, Denmark
9	(Denmark)	Ulrich Linnet	F	L	34		Herning, Denmark
65	(Denmark)	Emil Møller Rasmussen	W	L	31		Rødovre, Denmark
50	(Denmark)	Luis Blak Olsen	LW	L	32		Østerbro, Denmark
16	(Denmark)	Oliver Reuter	C	L	26		Rødovre, Denmark
18	(Finland)	Joonas Riekkinen (A)	D/C	L	38		Varpaisjärvi, Finland
19	(United States)	Cam Spiro	LW	L	34		Hingham, Massachusetts, United States
14	(Finland)	Marko Virtala	F	L	40		Uusikaupunki, Finland
10	(Denmark)	Nikolaj Zorko	C	L	31		

== Notable players ==
- Michael de Angelis
- Matthias Asperup
- Wayne Gagné
- Cody Kunyk
- Lauri Kärmeniemi
- Alexander Kuzminski
- Markus Lauridsen
- Oliver Lauridsen
- Rasmus Olsen
- Ossi Saarinen
- Frederik Storm
- Alexander Sundberg
