= Gladsaxe SF =

- City: Gladsaxe, Denmark
- League: Danish Division 1
- Founded: 1959
- Home arena: Gladsaxe Skojtehal
- Colours: Blue, Red
- Website: glis.dk

Gladsaxe SF is a former ice hockey team in Gladsaxe, Denmark. They played in the Danish Division 1, the second level of ice hockey in Denmark. The club went bankrupt in 2002.

== History ==
The club was founded in 1959. They won the AL-Bank Ligaen five times in the 1960s and 1970s, and the Danish Division 1 twice in 1987, and 1996.

== Achievements ==
- AL-Bank Ligaen
  - Champion (5) : 1967, 1968, 1971, 1974 et 1975
  - Runner-up (4) : 1966, 1969, 1970 et 1977
- Danish Division 1 (2) : 1996, 1987
