= Kjøbenhavns Skøjteløberforening =

Sports club in Copenhagen, Denmark

Club logo

Kjøbenhavns Skøjteløberforening (English: Copenhagen Ice Skating Club), commonly known as KSF, are a Danish ice hockey team in Copenhagen currently playing in the third tier Danish ice hockey league, the second division. The team is the oldest ice skating club and ice hockey team in Denmark, having been founded on 4 February 1869. When bandy was played in Denmark between 1895 and 1924, KSF was the dominating club.

From 1870 to 1960 the club was based on the Copenhagen lakes, first at Sortedams Sø, and from 1886 at Peblinge Sø. In 1894 the team built Søpavillionen (the Lake Pavilion) on the bank of Peblinge Sø to act as a club house.

== Ice hockey team ==
The hockey team within Kjøbenhavns was founded in 1938 by Jørgen Hviid. The team moved to Østerbro in 1960, but for a few years in the first half of the 1970s the team would play its home games at the Forum Arena in Frederiksberg. From 1975 the team played in Østerbro Skøjtehal. That rink was demolished in 2008 and the team is currently residing in a temporary rink in Ryparken until a permanent rink, at an undetermined location, is built. The team has won the Danish league title at least 10 times from 1956 to 1976. It was relegated out of the top league following the 1984–85 season and has not returned to the top division since. Notable players for the team include Jørgen Hviid and Bent Hansen.
