= Rødovre Mighty Bulls =

- City: Rødovre
- League: Metal Ligaen
- Founded: 1961
- Home arena: Rødovre Skøjte Arena (Capacity: 3,600)
- Colors
- Head coach: Olaf Eller
- Captain: Mads Eller
- Website: mightybulls.dk

The Rødovre Mighty Bulls are a Danish professional ice hockey team based in Rødovre, Denmark, playing in the Metal Ligaen, the top tier of Danish ice hockey. The club was founded in 1961 and play their home games in the Rødovre Skøjte Arena which has a capacity of 3,600 spectators.

The club has won the Danish championship 6 times in 1978, 1983, 1985, 1986, 1990 and 1999.

From 1977 to 1979, the team was coached by Boris Kulagin, the former coach of the Soviet national ice hockey team. Kulagin joined the Danish team after getting fired as head coach of the Soviet national team following a disappointing 3rd-place finish at the 1977 World Ice Hockey Championships. Rødovre had used contacts at the Soviet Embassy in Copenhagen, asking them to find a suitable coach for the team. Much to their surprise, they received the famous World Championship winning coach. The fact that such a high level coach was sent to coach in the then lowly Danish league was seen by many as an additional form of punishment for the poor result at the 1977 World Championships. Under Kulagin's guidance, the team won their first Danish title in 1978.

== Players ==
=== Current roster ===
Updated 6 October 2024.

No.	Nat	Player	Pos	S/G	Age	Acquired	Birthplace
33	(Denmark)	Albert Adamsen	G	L	26	2024	Rødovre, Denmark
41	(Denmark)	Sebastian Bergholt	D	L	32	2023	Copenhagen, Denmark
15	(Denmark)	Mikey Bergmann	F	L	18	2024	Hvidovre, Denmark
17	(Denmark)	Andrew Bjergstad	LW	L	19	2024	Hvidovre, Denmark
22	(Denmark)	William Bundgaard	F	L	18	2023	Hvidovre, Denmark
77	(Denmark)	Jacob Böll	D	L	30	2024	Rungsted, Denmark
55	(Denmark)	Lasse Carlsen	D	L	26	2019	Rødovre, Denmark
11	(Denmark)	Mads Eller (**C**)	W	L	30	2022	Rødovre, Denmark
20	(Denmark)	Victor Gade	F	L	21	2024	Herlev, Denmark
13	(Finland)	Frank Gymer	C	L	29	2022	Helsinki, Finland
28	(Sweden)	Måns Hansson	D	R	27	2022	Gessie, Sweden
90	(Denmark)	Alex Haunstoft	LW	L	23	2023	Copenhagen, Denmark
24	(Denmark)	Niclas Krarup	C	L	25	2021	Aalborg, Denmark
78	(Denmark)	Edvard Lundmark	D	L	21	2023	Rødovre, Denmark
19	(Canada)	Brandon Magee	C	R	31	2024	Edmonton, Alberta, Canada
67	(Denmark)	Oliver Marklund	F	L	21	2022	Herlev, Denmark
18	(Finland)	Sami Moilanen	LW	L	26	2023	Sipoo, Finland
91	(Denmark)	Christopher Rübenach	LW	R	24	2021	Charlottenlund, Denmark
1	(Denmark)	William Rørth	G	L	26	2016	Copenhagen, Denmark
30	(Denmark)	Malte Setkov	D	L	27	2024	Rødovre, Denmark
10	(Denmark)	Sebastian Strømstad	F	L	19	2023	Rødovre, Denmark

=== Retired numbers ===
Rødovre Mighty Bulls retired numbers
No.	Player	Position	Career
**5**	Tommy Pedersen	D	1970–1990
**29**	Jannik Stæhr	F	1991–1994

=== Notable former players ===
- (Denmark) Kim Andersen
- (Denmark) Karsten Arvidsen
- (Russia) Valeri Bragin
- (Denmark) Mads Bødker
- (Denmark) **Mikkel Bødker**
- (Russia) Anatoli Chistyakov
- (Denmark) Sebastian Dahm
- (Denmark) Jesper Duus
- (Denmark) **Lars Eller**
- (Denmark) Olaf Eller
- (Denmark) Bent Hansen
- (Denmark) **Jannik Hansen**
- (Canada) Christian Larrivée
- (Italy) Patrice Lefebvre
- (Denmark) Morten Madsen
- (Denmark) Tommy Pedersen
- (Finland) Juha Riihijärvi
- (Denmark) Michael Smidt
- (Canada) **Jeremy Stevenson**

Players in bold are NHL alumni.

== Championships ==
- 1978
- 1983
- 1985
- 1986
- 1990
- 1999
