= Esbjerg IK =

- City: Esbjerg, Denmark
- Founded: 1964
- Home arena: Esbjerg Skøjtehal (4,195 seats)

Franchise history
- 1964-present: Esbjerg IK

Esbjerg IK is an ice hockey club in Esbjerg, Denmark, with several youth and amateurs' teams. They have played their home games at Esbjerg Skøjtehal since 1976.

== History ==
Esbjerg IK was founded on November 4, 1964, however, there was already an ice hockey team in Esbjerg before they were founded. With seven Danish championships, and ten runners-up, they are one of the most successful Danish clubs.

They took part in the IIHF European Champions Cup several times. In the 1969-70 season, the club was defeated by EV Füssen 6-1, and 9-2. In the 1988-89 European Cup, they participated in a group with HC Dosza Ujpest, Dynamo Berlin, and CSKA Moscow. They lost 4-2 to Ujpest, 8-3 to Berlin, and 21-1 to Moscow. Esbjerg also participated in the IIHF Continental Cup in 1998 and 2005.

After the 2004-05 season, the professional license of the club was taken over from the football club, Esbjerg fB.r. The new team competes in the Metal Ligaen as Esbjerg Energy, while Esbjerg IK only consists of a youth department and amateurs' department.

== Achievements ==
- Danish champion (7): 1969, 1988, 1993, 1996, 2004, 2016, 2017
- Danish runner-up (9): 1965, 1968, 1972, 1986, 1992, 1994, 1995, 1997, 2015
- Danish Cup winner (3): 1989, 1992, 1993

== Notable players ==
- Philip Larsen
- Jukka Vilander
