= Rungsted Ishockey Klub =

Danish ice hockey club

- Rungsted Seier Capital logo
- Sport: Ice hockey
- Founded: 1941
- Location: Rungsted, Denmark
- Head coach: Gunnar Leidborg
- Website: Official website

Rungsted Ishockey Klub is a Danish ice hockey club from Rungsted. The elite team is called Rungsted Seier Capital.

== History ==
The club was founded in 1941.

=== Nordsjælland Cobras ===
The Nordsjælland Cobras was the elite team for Rungsted Ishockey Klub and played in the top Danish ice hockey league AL-Bank Ligaen. After filing for bankruptcy at the end of the 2009–2010 season, the team was excluded from the following season.

They changed name from the Rungsted Cobras to the Nordsjælland Cobras in 2004, but they are still based in Rungsted. The team won the Danish national championship in 2003.

According to the club, the shortfall is due to sponsorship money that has not been paid due and the current economic crisis has left club owners unable to cover the shortfall. In an effort to help, Cobras' arch-rival Rødovre Mighty Bulls has announced it will play an exhibition game during the national team break (now through February 10) against the Cobras, with all proceeds going to the Cobras. On 7 April 2011 they announced that they will delay their comeback to AL-Bank Ligaen by a year.

== Players ==
=== Current roster ===
Updated 14 June 2025.

No.	Nat	Player	Pos	S/G	Age	Acquired	Birthplace
24	(Denmark)	Anton Als	D	L	21	2024	Rødovre, Denmark
25	(Sweden)	Ludvig Elvenes	LW	L	29	2024	Malmö, Sweden
31	(Denmark)	David Grubak	G	L	25	2024	Jægerspris, Denmark
7	(Denmark)	Christian Lindholt Hartmann	RW		19	2023	Gentofte, Denmark
91	(Switzerland)	Valdemar Hull	C	L	21	2024	Fribourg, Switzerland
33	(Denmark)	Morten Jensen	D	L	29	2022	Esbjerg, Denmark
18	(Denmark)	Jonas Krabbe	C	L	22	2024	Täby, Sweden
10	(Denmark)	Andreas Nielsson	C	L	22	2023	Aalborg, Denmark
2	(Canada)	Andrew Peski	D	R	29	2024	Orleans, Ontario, Canada
46	(Denmark)	Mathias Røndbjerg	D	L	29	2020	Rungsted, Denmark

=== Notable former players ===
- Fraser Clair
- Brad DeFauw
- Kasper Degn
- Lasse Degn
- Kerry Ellis-Toddington
- Milan Gajic
- Morten Green
- Niklas Karmhag
- Tobias Kisum
- Mikko Niinikoski
- Johan Olsson
- Nicklas Plambeck
- Mattias Remstam
- Jonathan Sjölund
- Daniel Wallin
