= 2003 IIHF World Championship rosters =

Rosters at the 2003 IIHF World Championship in Finland.

== Canada ==
vlevo
Position	Player	Club
Goaltenders	Sean Burke	Phoenix Coyotes
	Roberto Luongo	Florida Panthers
	Martin Biron	Buffalo Sabres
Defencemen	Eric Brewer	Edmonton Oilers
	Jay Bouwmeester	Florida Panthers
	Jamie Heward	Genève-Servette HC
	Mathieu Dandenault	Detroit Red Wings
	Cory Cross	Edmonton Oilers
	Steve Staios	Edmonton Oilers
	Craig Rivet	Montreal Canadiens
Forwards	Daniel Brière	Buffalo Sabres
	Shawn Horcoff	Edmonton Oilers
	Patrick Marleau	San Jose Sharks
	Dany Heatley	Atlanta Thrashers
	Kyle Calder	Chicago Blackhawks
	Kirk Maltby	Detroit Red Wings
	Shane Doan	Phoenix Coyotes
	Anson Carter	New York Rangers
	Steven Reinprecht	Colorado Avalanche
	Kris Draper	Detroit Red Wings
	Krys Kolanos	Phoenix Coyotes
	Mike Comrie	Edmonton Oilers
	Ryan Smyth	Edmonton Oilers
	Jan Alston	ZSC Lions
Coaches	Andy Murray	
	Rob Cookson	

== Sweden ==
vlevo
Position	Player	Club
Goaltenders	Tommy Salo	Edmonton Oilers
	Mikael Tellqvist	St. John's Maple Leafs
	Henrik Lundqvist	Frölunda HC
Defencemen	Magnus Johansson	Frölunda HC
	Per Gustafsson	HV71
	Niklas Kronwall	Djurgårdens IF
	Mattias Norström	Los Angeles Kings
	Thomas Rhodin	Färjestad BK
	Ronnie Sundin	Frölunda HC
	Dick Tärnström	Pittsburgh Penguins
	Daniel Tjärnqvist	Atlanta Thrashers
Forwards	Mats Sundin	Toronto Maple Leafs
	Peter Forsberg	Colorado Avalanche
	Peter Nordström	Färjestad BK
	Per-Johan Axelsson	Boston Bruins
	Mathias Johansson	Pittsburgh Penguins
	Marcus Nilson	Florida Panthers
	Mikael Renberg	Toronto Maple Leafs
	Henrik Zetterberg	Detroit Red Wings
	Niklas Andersson	Frölunda HC
	Jonas Höglund	Toronto Maple Leafs
	Jörgen Jönsson	Färjestad BK
	Mika Hannula	Malmö Redhawks
	Mathias Tjärnqvist	Djurgårdens IF
	Johan Davidsson	HV71
Coaches	Hardy Nilsson	
	Tommy Samuelsson	

== Slovakia ==
vlevo
Position	Player	Club
Goaltenders	Ján Lašák	Nashville Predators
	Rastislav Staňa	Portland Pirates
	Pavol Rybár	Slovan Bratislava
Defencemen	Ľubomír Višňovský	Los Angeles Kings
	Martin Štrbák	HPK
	Richard Lintner	Pittsburgh Penguins
	Radoslav Suchý	Phoenix Coyotes
	Róbert Švehla	Toronto Maple Leafs
	Dušan Milo	Modo Hockey
	Ladislav Čierny	Lada Togliatti
	Ivan Majeský	Florida Panthers
Forwards	Žigmund Pálffy	Los Angeles Kings
	Jozef Stümpel	Boston Bruins
	Miroslav Šatan	Buffalo Sabres
	Richard Zedník	Montreal Canadiens
	Ladislav Nagy	Phoenix Coyotes
	Peter Bondra	Washington Capitals
	Miroslav Hlinka	Modo Hockey
	Richard Kapuš	Slovan Bratislava
	Pavol Demitra	St. Louis Blues
	Branko Radivojevič	Phoenix Coyotes
	Vladimír Országh	Nashville Predators
	Ľubomír Vaic	SaiPa
	Zdeno Cíger	Slovan Bratislava
	Peter Sejna	St. Louis Blues
Coaches	František Hossa	
	Vladimír Šťastný	

== Austria ==
Position	Player	Club
Goaltenders	Michael Sutting	KAC Klagenfurt
	Claus Dalpiaz	HC Innsbruck
	Gert Prohaska	VSV Villach
Defencemen	Gerhard Unterluggauer	DEG Metro Stars
	Rob Doyle	EHC Lustenau
	Herbert Hohenberger	VSV Villach
	Andre Lakos	Vienna Capitals
	Philippe Lakos	Vienna Capitals
	Robert Lukas	EHC Linz
	Peter Kasper	HC Innsbruck
Forwards	Christian Perthaler	EHC Linz
	Thomas Koch	KAC Klagenfurt
	Mark Szucs	EHC Linz
	Oliver Setzinger	Vienna Capitals
	Thomas Pock	UMass Minutemen ice hockey
	Kent Salfi	VSV Villach
	Philipp Lukas	EHC Linz
	Daniel Welser	KAC Klagenfurt
	Matthias Trattnig	Djurgardens IF
	Raimund Divis	VEU Feldkirch
	Christoph Brandner	Krefeld Pinguine
	Martin Hohenberger	HC Innsbruck
	Dieter Kalt	Farjestads BK
Coaches	Herbert Pock	

== Belarus ==
Position	Player	Club
Goalkeepers	Sergei Shabanov	Metallurg Novokuznetsk
	Andrei Mezin	AK Bars Kazan
	Leonid Grishukevich	HC Keramin-Minsk
Defenders	Oleg Khmyl	HC Neftekhimik Nizhnekamsk
	Alexander Makritski	Krylya Sovetov Moscow
	Alexander Ryadinsky	HC Keramin-Minsk
	Sergei Erkovich	TPS Turku
	Aleksandr Alekseyev	HC Gomel
	Sergei Stas	Krefeld Pinguine
	Aleksandr Zhurik	HC CSKA Moscow
	Vladimir Kopat	HC Keramin-Minsk
Forwards	Vadzim Karaha	Polimir Novopolotsk
	Vadim Bekbulatov	HC Gomel
	Andrei Kovalev	SC Bietigheim-Bissingen
	Henadzi Savilau	HC Keramin-Minsk
	Aliaksei Strakhau	HC Gomel
	Yaroslav Chupris	HC Keramin-Minsk
	Sergei Zadelenov	HC Gomel
	Andrei Kostitsyn	HC CSKA Moscow
	Dmitry Starostenko	Dynamo Moscow
	Vladimir Tsyplakov	Ak Bars Kazan
	Dmitry Pankov	Metallurg Novokuznetsk
	Andrey Rasolko	Neftekhimik Nizhnekamsk
	Alexei Kalyuzhny	Severstal Cherepovets
Coaches	Vladimir Krikunov	
	Ivan Kryvanosau	
	Vladimir Safonov	

== Czech Republic ==
Position	Player	Club
Goaltenders	Tomáš Vokoun	Nashville Predators
	Roman Málek	Sparta Prague
	Jiří Trvaj	HC Vítkovice
Defencemen	Tomáš Kaberle	Toronto Maple Leafs
	Jaroslav Modrý	Los Angeles Kings
	Jaroslav Špaček	Columbus Blue Jackets
	Martin Richter	Sparta Prague
	Pavel Kolařík	Slavia Prague
	Jan Hejda	Slavia Prague
	Petr Kadlec	Slavia Prague
	Pavel Trnka	Florida Panthers
Forwards	Milan Hejduk	Colorado Avalanche
	Martin Straka	Pittsburgh Penguins
	Jan Hlaváč	Carolina Hurricanes
	David Výborný	Columbus Blue Jackets
	Robert Reichel	Toronto Maple Leafs C
	Jaroslav Hlinka	Kloten Flyers
	Radek Duda	Slavia Prague
	Jiří Hudler	Ak Bars Kazan
	Michal Sup	Slavia Prague
	Radim Vrbata	Carolina Hurricanes
	Josef Vašíček	Carolina Hurricanes
	Jaroslav Balaštík	HPK
	Jindřich Kotrla	HC Litvínov
	Milan Michálek	HC České Budějovice
Coaches	Slavomír Lener	
	Antonín Stavjaňa	
	Vladimír Růžička	

== Denmark ==
Position	Player	Club
Goaltenders	Michael Madsen	Rungsted IK
	Peter Hirsch	MoDo Ornskoldsvik
	Jen Jensen	Esbjerg IK
Defencemen	Jesper Duus	Herlev IK
	Daniel Nielsen	Herning IK
	Thomas Johnsen	IF Troja/Ljungby
	Jesper Damgaard	MoDo Ornskoldsvik
	Dan Jensen	Herning IK
	Frederik Akesson	Aalborg IK
	Andreas Andreasen	Esbjerg IK
Forwards	Thor Dresler	IF Troja/Ljungby
	Bo Nordby-Andersen	Aalborg IK
	Lasse Degn	Rungsted IK
	Mads True	Odense IK
	Ronny Larsen	Aalborg IK
	Lars Molgaard	Fredrikshavn IK
	Frans Nielsen	Malmö Redhawks
	Nicolas Monberg	Rungsted IK
	Kim Staal	MoDo Ornskoldsvik
	Mike Grey	Fredrikshavn IK
	Soren True	Herlev IK
	Jens Nielsen	Leksands IF
	Morten Green	MoDo Ornskoldsvik
Coaches	Mikael Lundstrom	
	Esben Nedermark	

== Finland ==
Position	Player	Club
Goaltenders	Jani Hurme	Florida Panthers
	Pasi Nurminen	Atlanta Thrashers
	Kari Lehtonen	Jokerit
Defencemen	Marko Kiprusoff	Kloten Flyers
	Petteri Nummelin	HC Lugano
	Kimmo Timonen	Nashville Predators
	Ossi Väänänen	Phoenix Coyotes
	Aki-Petteri Berg	Toronto Maple Leafs
	Toni Lydman	Calgary Flames
	Janne Niinimaa	New York Islanders
	Sami Helenius	Chicago Blackhawks
Forwards	Teemu Selänne	San Jose Sharks
	Esa Pirnes	Tappara
	Saku Koivu	Montreal Canadiens
	Olli Jokinen	Florida Panthers
	Niklas Hagman	Florida Panthers
	Ville Peltonen	Jokerit
	Tomi Kallio	Frölunda HC
	Tony Virta	Södertälje SK
	Antti Miettinen	HPK
	Mikko Eloranta	Los Angeles Kings
	Tommi Santala	HPK
	Lasse Pirjetä	Columbus Blue Jackets
	Kimmo Rintanen	Kloten Flyers
	Juha Ylönen	Blues
Coaches	Hannu Aravirta	
	Jari Kaarela	

== Germany ==
Position	Player	Club
Goaltenders	Oliver Jonas	Eisbären Berlin
	Alexander Jung	DEG Metro Stars
	Robert Müller	Krefeld Pinguine
Defencemen	Jochen Molling	Hamburg Freezers
	Sascha Goc	Adler Mannheim
	Christian Ehrhoff	Krefeld Pinguine
	Mirco Ludemann	Kölner Haie
	Andreas Renz	Kölner Haie
	Daniel Kunce	Krefeld Pinguine
	Lasse Kopitz	Iserlohn Roosters
	Jan Benda	Ak Bars Kazan
	Stephan Retzer	Kassel Huskies
Forwards	Sven Felski	Eisbären Berlin
	Martin Reichel	Nürnberg Ice Tigers
	Daniel Kreutzer	DEG Metro Stars
	Tobias Abstreiter	Kassel Huskies
	Tomas Martinec	Adler Mannheim
	Eduard Lewandowski	Kölner Haie
	Tino Boos	Kölner Haie
	Len Soccio	Hannover Scorpions
	Klaus Kathan	Adler Mannheim
	Boris Blank	Eisbären Berlin
	Marcel Goc	Adler Mannheim
	Christian Hommel	Iserlohn Roosters
	Andreas Morczinietz	Kölner Haie
Coaches	Hans Zach	
	Berni Englbrecht	

== Japan ==
Position	Player	Club
Goalkeepers	Naoya Kikuchi	Seibu Prince Rabbits
	Jiro Igor Nihei	Kokudo Yokohama
	Masahito Haruna	Nikkō Ice Bucks
Defenders	Kengo Ito	Nippon Paper Cranes
	Fumitaka Miyauchi	Kokudo
	Makoto Kawashima	Oji
	Daniel Daikawa	Seibu
	Joel Oshiro	Cranes
	Nobuhiro Sugawara	Oji
	Yutaka Kawaguchi	Kokudo
	Koichi Yamazaki	Seibu
Forwards	Tomohiko Uchiyama	Kokudo
	Yosuke Kon	Seibu
	Takahito Suzuki	Charlotte Checkers
	Daisuke Obara	Waseda University
	Tetsuya Saito	Oji
	Takeshi Saito	Oji
	Tomohito Kobayashi	Seibu
	Kunihiko Sakurai	Oji
	Yoshikazu Kabayama	Seibu
	Keiji Sasaki	Kokudo
	Ryan Kuwabara	Belfast Giants
	Chris Yule	Kokudo
	Masatoshi Ito	Cranes
	Shuji Masuko	Kokudo
Coaches	Timo Tuomi	
	Toshiyuki Sakai	
	Chris Wakabayashi	

== Latvia ==
Position	Player	Club
Goalkeepers	Artūrs Irbe	Carolina Hurricanes
	Sergejs Naumovs	SKA Saint Petersburg
	Edgars Masaļskis	Mörrum GoIS IK
Defenders	Rodrigo Laviņš	Dynamo Moscow
	Arvīds Reķis	Peoria Rivermen
	Vents Feldmanis	FK Liepājas Metalurgs
	Atvars Tribuncovs	Salavat Yulaev Ufa
	Kārlis Skrastiņš	Nashville Predators
	Krišjānis Rēdlihs	Albany River Rats
	Oļegs Sorokins	Assat Pori
Forwards	Vjaceslavs Fanduls	Assat Pori
	Jānis Sprukts	Acadie-Bathurst Titan
	Grigorijs Panteļejevs	Lahti Pelicans
	Leonids Tambijevs	Torpedo Nizhny Novgorod
	Ģirts Ankipāns	Landshut Cannibals
	Sergejs Čubars	Herlev Hornets
	Aleksandrs Kerčs	SKA Saint Petersburg
	Aleksejs Širokovs	FK Liepājas Metalurgs
	Aleksandrs Ņiživijs	Molot-Prikamye Perm
	Aigars Cipruss	SaiPa
	Vadims Romanovskis	HK Riga 2000
	Aleksandrs Semjonovs	Aalborg Pirates
	Aleksandrs Macijevskis	Odense Bulldogs
Coaches	Curt Lindstrom	
	Mats Ulander	
	Oleg Znaroks	

== United States ==
Position	Player	Club
Goaltenders	Ryan Miller	Buffalo Sabres
	Chris Rogles	Kölner Haie
	Damian Rhodes	Greenville Grrrowl
Defencemen	Brett Hauer	Genève-Servette HC
	Mike Mottau	Saint John Flames
	Jordan Leopold	Calgary Flames
	Joe Corvo	Los Angeles Kings
	Phil Housley	Toronto Maple Leafs
	Jim Fahey	San Jose Sharks
	John Gruden	Eisbären Berlin
	Francis Bouillon	Montreal Canadiens
Forwards	Matt Cullen	Florida Panthers
	Kevin Miller	HC Davos
	John Pohl	Worcester Ice Cats
	Chris Ferraro	Portland Pirates
	Ted Drury	Hamburg Freezers
	Niko Dimitrakos	San Jose Sharks
	Peter Ferraro	Portland Pirates
	Adam Hall	Nashville Predators
	Marty Reasoner	Edmonton Oilers
	Kelly Fairchild	Eisbären Berlin
	Craig Johnson	Los Angeles Kings
	Brad DeFauw	Carolina Hurricanes
Coaches	Lou Vairo	
	Jay Leach	

== Russia ==
Position	Player	Club
Goaltenders	Andrei Tsarev	Ak Bars Kazan
	Yegor Podomatsky	Lokomotiv Yaroslavl
	Maxim Sokolov	Avangard Omsk
Defencemen	Sergei Gusev	Severstal Cherepovets
	Alexander Guskov	Lokomotiv Yaroslavl
	Alexander Khavanov	St. Louis Blues
	Dmitri Erofeev	Ak Bars Kazan
	Dmitri Kalinin	Buffalo Sabres
	Vitali Proshkin	Ak Bars Kazan
	Vasili Turkovsky	Severstal Cherepovets
	Sergei Vyshedkevich	Dynamo Moscow
	Alexander Zhdan	Dynamo Moscow
Forwards	Vladimir Antipov	Lokomotiv Yaroslavl
	Denis Arkhipov	Nashville Predators
	Pavel Datsyuk	Detroit Red Wings
	Alexander Frolov	Los Angeles Kings
	Igor Grigorenko	Lada Togliatti
	Alexei Kaigorodov	Metallurg Magnitogorsk
	Ilya Kovalchuk	Atlanta Thrashers
	Ivan Novoseltsev	Florida Panthers
	Oleg Saprykin	Calgary Flames
	Alexander Semin	Lada Togliatti
	Sergei Soin	Krylia Sovetov Moskva
	Aleksander Suglobov	Lokomotiv Yaroslavl
	Sergei Zinoviev	Ak Bars Kazan
Coaches	Vladimir Plyushchev	
	Nikolai Tolstikov	
	Alexander Yakushev	

== Slovenia ==
Position	Player	Club
Goaltenders	Robert Kristan	HDD Olimpija Ljubljana
	Klemen Mohorič	HC Keramin-Minsk
	Gaber Glavič	HK Acroni Jesenice
Defencemen	Bojan Zajc	HK Olimpija Ljubljana
	Robert Ciglenčki	HK Olimpija Ljubljana
	Andrej Brodnik	HK Olimpija Ljubljana
	Aleš Krajnc	HK Acroni Jesenice
	Jurij Goličič	HDD Olimpija Ljublijana
	Damjan Dervarič	HK Olimpija Ljubljana
	Elvis Bešlagić	ERC Selb
	Miha Rebolj	HK Acroni Jesenice
Forwards	Edo Terglav	HK Olimpija Ljubljana
	Tomaž Razingar	HK Acroni Jesenice
	Mitja Šivic	THK Tver
	Gregor Por	HK Acroni Jesenice
	Luka Žagar	HK Olimpija Ljubljana
	Dejan Kontrec	HK Olimpija Ljubljana
	Boris Pretnar	HK Acroni Jesenice
	Gregor Polončič	HC Oceláři Třinec
	Jaka Avgustinčič	HDD Olimpija Ljublijana
	Marcel Rodman	Graz 99ers
	Tomaž Vnuk	VEU Feldkirch
	Anže Terlikar	HK Acroni Jesenice
	Ivo Jan	HK Olimpija Ljubljana
	Peter Rožič	HK Olimpija Ljubljana
Coaches	Matjaž Sekelj	
	Darko Prusnik	
	Andrej Vidmar	

== Switzerland ==
Position	Player	Club
Goaltenders	Lars Weibel	HC Davos
	Marco Bührer	SC Bern
	Tobias Stephan	Kloten Flyers
Defencemen	Lukas Gerber	Fribourg-Gotteron
	Mark Streit	ZSC Lions
	Severin Blindenbacher	Kloten Flyers
	Martin Steinegger	SC Bern
	Goran Bezina	Springfield Falcons
	Beat Forster	HC Davos
	Mathias Seger	ZSC Lions
	Patrick Fischer	EV Zug
	Olivier Keller	HC Lugano
Forwards	Flavien Conne	HC Lugano
	Patric Della Rossa	ZSC Lions
	Adrian Wichser	HC Lugano
	Luca Cereda	St. John's Maple Leafs
	Jean-Jacques Aeschlimann	HC Lugano
	Patrick Fischer	HC Davos
	Thierry Paterlini	HC Davos
	Patrik Bärtschi	Kloten Flyers
	Valentin Wirz	Fribourg-Gotteron
	Martin Plüss	Kloten Flyers
	Marcel Jenni	Färjestad BK
	Sandy Jeannin	HC Lugano
	Björn Christen	HC Davos
Coaches	Ralph Krueger	
	Jakob Kölliker	
	Peter John Lee	

== Ukraine ==
Position	Player	Club
Goaltenders	Kostiantyn Simchuk	Salavat Yulaev Ufa
	Igor Karpenko	Metallurg Magnitogorsk
	Vadim Seliverstov	Sokil Kyiv
Defencemen	Yuri Gunko	Sokil Kyiv
	Serhiy Klymentiev	Metallurg Magnitogorsk
	Vyacheslav Timchenko	Weisswasser
	Andriy Sryubko	Sokil Kyiv
	Artem Ostroushko	SKA Saint Petersburg
	Valeri Shyriaiev	EV Zug
	Vyacheslav Zavalnyuk	SKA Saint Petersburg
Forwards	Vasyl Bobrovnikov	Sokil Kyiv
	Dmitri Khristich	Metallurg Magnitogorsk
	Sergiy Kharchenko	EV Füssen
	Vadym Shakhraychuk	HC Spartak Moscow
	Vitaliy Lytvynenko	Torpedo Nizhny Novgorod
	Andrei Nikolayev	Sokil Kyiv
	Borys Protsenko	Sokil Kyiv
	Kostiantyn Kasianchuk	Khimik Voskresensk
	Roman Salnikov	Krylya Sovetov Moscow
	Bogdan Savenko	Sokil Kyiv
	Serhiy Varlamov	St. Louis Blues
	Ruslan Bezshchasnyy	EV Fussen
	Artem Hnidenko	HK Riga 2000
	Olexandr Zinevych	Peoria Rivermen
Coaches	Anatoly Bogdanov	
	Alexander Seukand	
