= Philip Hersby =

Danish ice hockey player

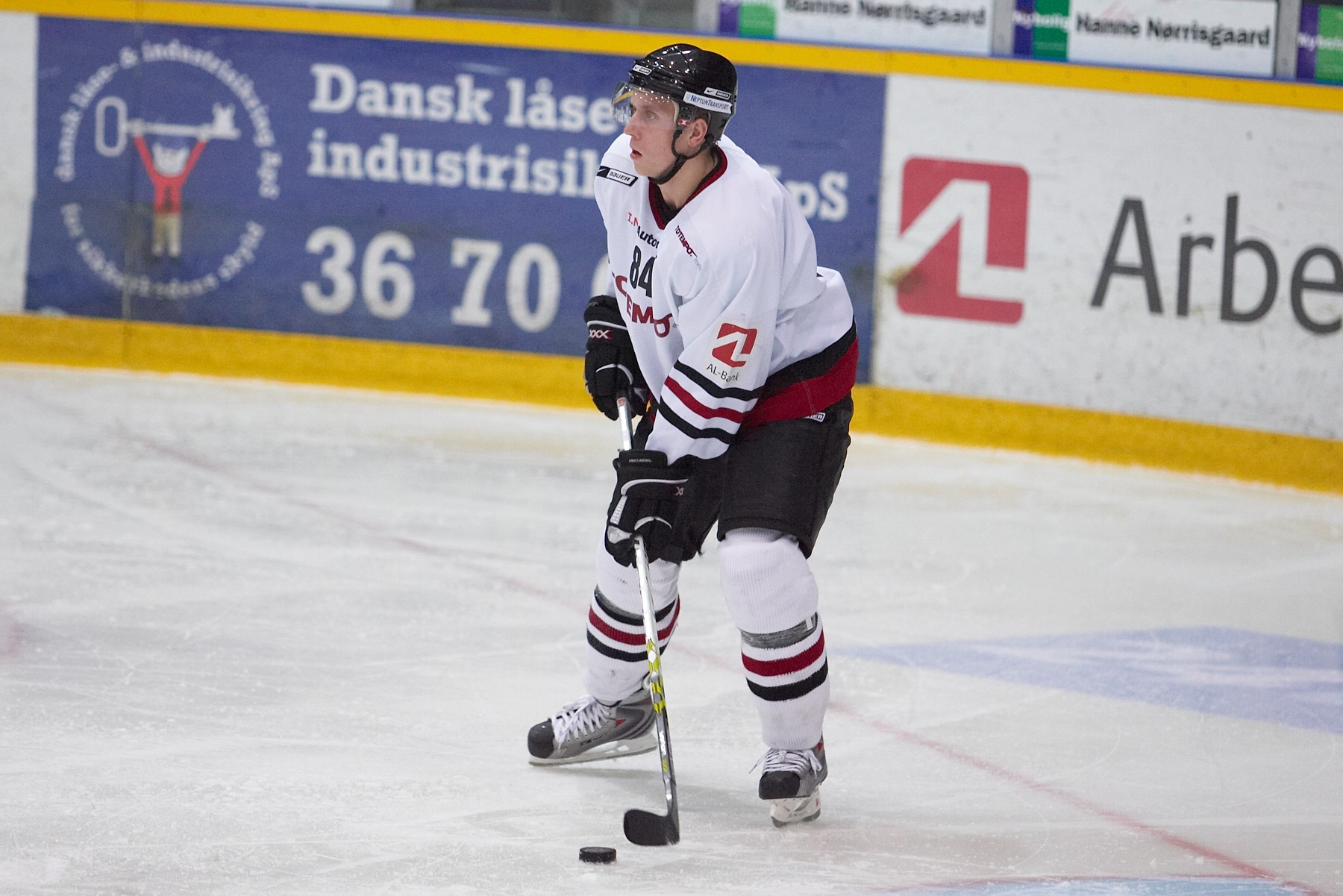
- Philip Hersby
- Born: July 25, 1984 (age 41) Malmö, Sweden
- Height: 5 ft 11 in (180 cm)
- Weight: 190 lb (86 kg; 13 st 8 lb)
- Position: Defence
- Shot: Left
- Played for: Malmö Redhawks, Esbjerg Ishockey Klub
- National team: Denmark
- NHL draft: Undrafted
- Playing career: 1999–2015

Philip Hersby (born July 25, 1984) is a Danish retired ice hockey defenceman who lastly played for Esbjerg Ishockey Klub of the Danish Metal Ligaen. He played eleven seasons in the Danish top league AL-Bank Ligaen, as well as participated in three Ice Hockey World Championships as a member of the Denmark men's national ice hockey team.

== Career statistics ==
			Regular season					Playoffs
Season	Team	League	GP	G	A	Pts	PIM	GP	G	A	Pts	PIM
1999–00	Hvidovre IK	Denmark2	10	1	1	2	0	—	—	—	—	—
2000–01	Hvidovre IK	Denmark2	20	2	3	5	12	—	—	—	—	—
2001–02	Hvidovre IK	Denmark	42	2	5	7	38	—	—	—	—	—
2002–03	Hvidovre IK	Denmark	25	1	1	2	32	—	—	—	—	—
2002–03	MIF Redhawks J20	J20 Superelit	6	0	1	1	4	4	0	1	1	2
2003–04	Rungsted Cobras	Denmark	35	2	7	9	22	7	0	0	0	0
2004–05	Herlev Eagles	Denmark	34	2	7	9	4	7	1	4	5	12
2005–06	Herlev Hornets	Denmark	31	3	5	8	24	—	—	—	—	—
2005–06	Stuttgart Wizards	Germany3	—	—	—	—	—	—	—	—	—	—
2006–07	Nordsjælland Cobras	Denmark	34	1	2	3	44	5	0	0	0	6
2007–08	Totempo HVIK	Denmark	45	9	14	23	42	7	0	2	2	10
2008–09	Totempo HVIK	Denmark	31	1	6	7	26	—	—	—	—	—
2009–10	Hvidovre Ligahockey	Denmark	34	9	11	20	79	5	1	2	3	12
2010–11	Hvidovre Ligahockey	Denmark	36	5	22	27	26	4	1	1	2	8
2011–12	Tingsryds AIF	HockeyAllsvenskan	35	0	1	1	20	—	—	—	—	—
2011–12	Odense Bulldogs	Denmark	6	1	3	4	4	15	1	8	9	80
2012–13	Malmö Redhawks	HockeyAllsvenskan	49	2	4	6	49	—	—	—	—	—
2013–14	Esbjerg Energy	Denmark	31	2	10	12	36	5	0	0	0	6
2014–15	Hvidovre Fighters	Denmark2	—	—	—	—	—	1	1	0	1	2
Denmark totals			384	38	93	131	377	55	4	17	21	134
