= Jesper Duus =

Danish ice hockey player

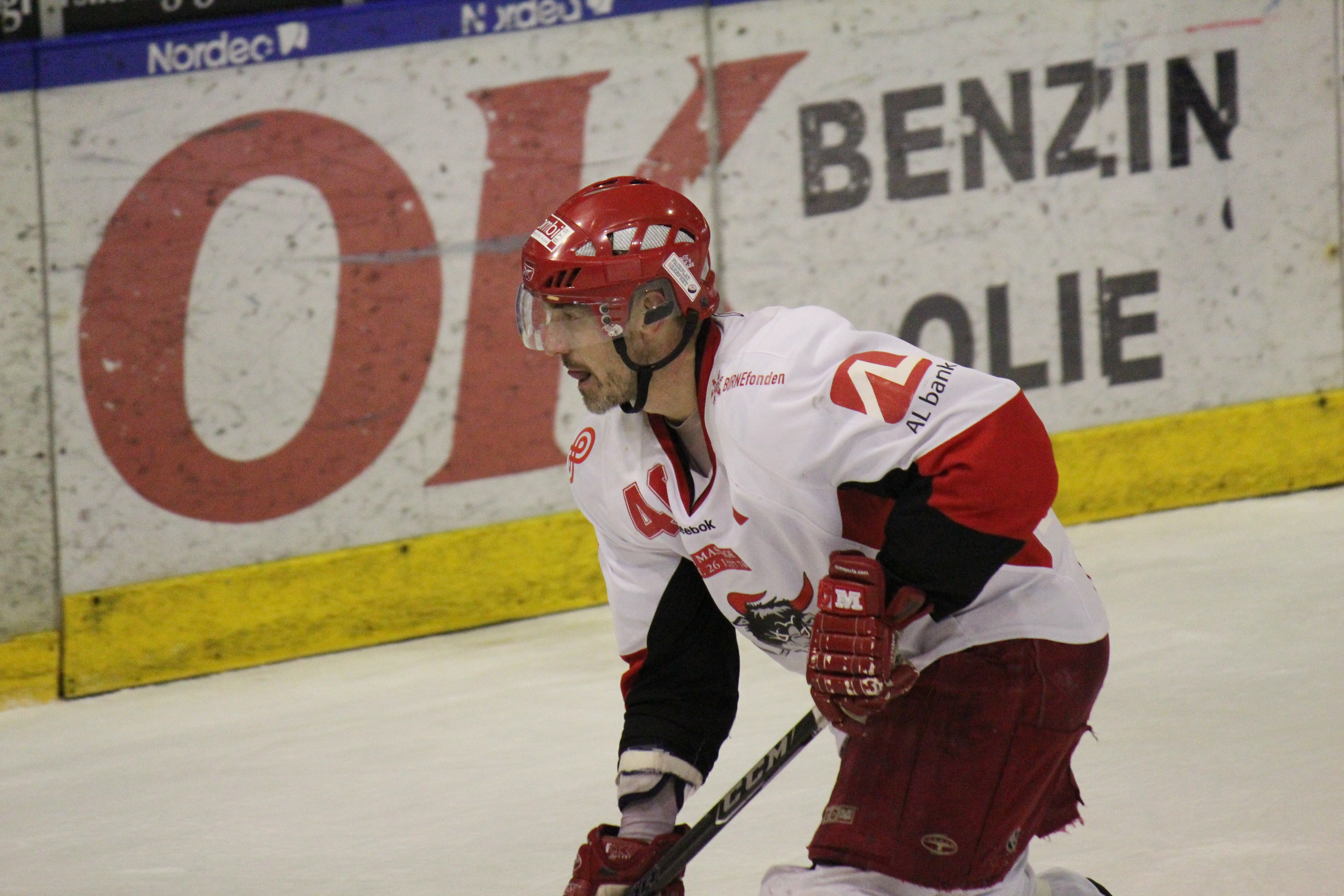
- Born: November 24, 1967 (age 58) Glostrup, Denmark
- Height: 6 ft 2 in (188 cm)
- Weight: 198 lb (90 kg; 14 st 2 lb)
- Position: Defence
- Shot: Right
- National team: Denmark
- NHL draft: 241st overall, 1987; Edmonton Oilers
- Playing career: 1983–2012

Jesper Duus (born November 24, 1967) is a Danish former professional ice hockey player who participated at the 2010 IIHF World Championship as a member of the Denmark National men's ice hockey team. He lastly played for Herlev Eagles in Denmark.

== Career statistics ==
			Regular season					Playoffs
Season	Team	League	GP	G	A	Pts	PIM	GP	G	A	Pts	PIM
1983–84	Rødovre SIK	Denmark	18	0	0	0	0	—	—	—	—	—
1984–85	Rødovre SIK	Denmark	28	2	6	8	6	—	—	—	—	—
1985–86	Rødovre SIK	Denmark	30	4	7	11	32	—	—	—	—	—
1986–87	Rødovre SIK	Denmark	30	7	17	24	20	—	—	—	—	—
1987–88	Färjestad BK	SHL	26	2	5	7	8	—	—	—	—	—
1988–89	Färjestad BK	SHL	36	4	4	8	10	2	0	0	0	0
1989–90	Färjestad BK	SHL	40	4	9	13	28	10	1	0	1	4
1990–91	Färjestad BK	SHL	40	1	7	8	20	8	0	2	2	6
1991–92	Färjestad BK	SHL	40	6	14	20	14	6	0	2	2	6
1992–93	Färjestad BK	SHL	38	7	13	20	18	3	0	1	1	0
1993–94	Färjestad BK	SHL	14	0	2	2	8	3	0	0	0	4
1993–94	Färjestad BK	Division 1	18	2	2	4	10	—	—	—	—	—
1994–95	Färjestad BK	SHL	39	2	4	6	20	4	0	0	0	6
1995–96	Färjestad BK	SHL	39	2	3	5	10	8	0	0	0	0
1996–97	Star Bulls Rosenheim	DEL	43	3	8	11	12	3	0	0	0	0
1997–98	VEU Feldkirch	Austria	47	1	14	15	37	—	—	—	—	—
1998–99	Star Bulls Rosenheim	DEL	52	3	4	7	20	—	—	—	—	—
1999–00	Modo Hockey	SHL	49	7	12	19	53	12	1	5	6	6
2000–01	Modo Hockey	SHL	43	3	3	6	18	7	0	0	0	2
2001–02	Hvidovre IK	Denmark	42	7	28	35	66	—	—	—	—	—
2002–03	Herlev Eagles	Denmark	4	0	0	0	0	6	0	1	1	2
2002–03	Hvidovre IK	Denmark	26	2	7	9	37	—	—	—	—	—
2003–04	Herlev Eagles	Denmark	30	3	7	10	26	—	—	—	—	—
2004–05	Herlev Eagles	Denmark	35	3	9	12	14	—	—	—	—	—
2005–06	Rødovre Mighty Bulls	Denmark	35	2	8	10	22	6	0	1	1	8
2006–07	Rødovre Mighty Bulls	Denmark	35	2	7	9	59	4	0	0	0	4
2007–08	TOTEMPO HvIK	Denmark	44	8	21	29	40	7	0	3	3	32
2008–09	Rødovre Mighty Bulls	Denmark	40	3	14	17	44	15	1	7	8	10
2009–10	Rødovre Mighty Bulls	Denmark	35	4	8	12	49	7	2	1	3	14
2010–11	Rødovre Mighty Bulls	Denmark	37	3	16	19	56	11	0	1	1	6
2011–12	Herlev Eagles	Denmark	40	2	15	17	26	4	0	0	0	0
2013–14	Rødovre SIK	Denmark	1	0	0	0	0	—	—	—	—	—
Denmark totals			509	52	170	222	497	60	3	14	17	76
SHL totals			404	38	76	114	207	63	2	10	12	34
