= Stefan Lassen =

Danish ice hockey player

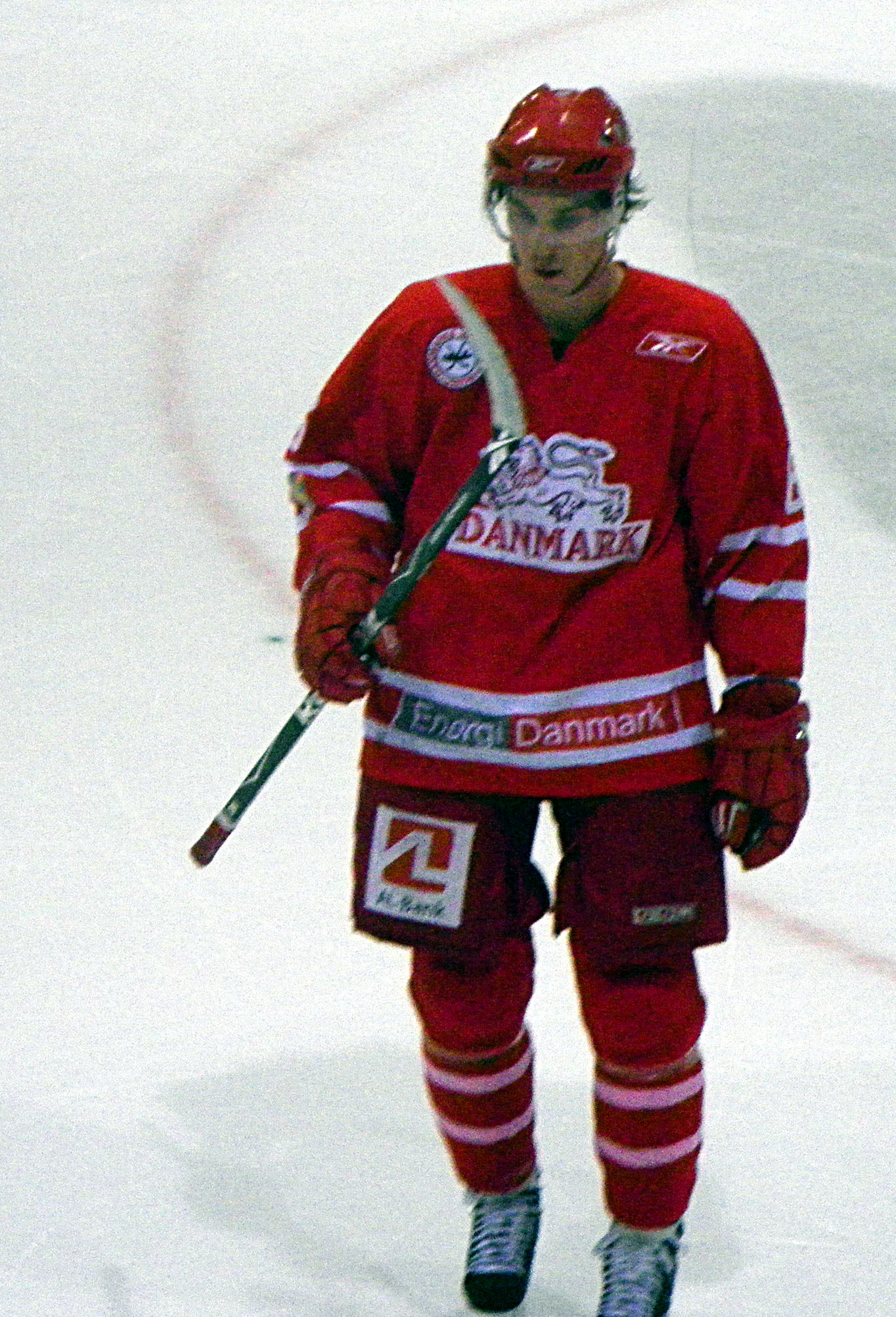
- Born: 1 November 1985 (age 39); Herning, Denmark
- Height: 6 ft 3 in (191 cm)
- Weight: 198 lb (90 kg; 14 st 2 lb)
- Position: Defence
- Shoots: Left
- Allsv team Former teams: Almtuna IS; Herning Blue Fox; Frederikshavn White Hawks; Djurgårdens IF; Graz 99ers Lahti Pelicans
- National team: Denmark
- Playing career: 2002–present

Stefan Lassen (born 1 November 1985) is a Danish professional ice hockey defenseman who currently plays for Almtuna IS in the HockeyAllsvenskan (Allsv).

== Playing career ==
Lassen began his career in Danish side Herning Blue Fox where he won the Danish Championship in 2007 and 2008. He moved to Sweden in 2009 with Leksands IF of the HockeyAllsvenskan before joining Elitserien club Djurgårdens IF the following season on 31 May 2010.

After a season stint in the EBEL with Austrian club Graz 99ers, Lassen moved to Finland signing a two-year contract with the Lahti Pelicans of the Liiga on 27 March 2015.

Lassen played for three years with the Pelicans, captaining the club in the 2017–18 season, before leaving the club to sign an initial one-year contract with Swedish club Almtuna IS of the HockeyAllsvenskan, on 19 September 2018.

== International play ==
Lassen has participated in two IIHF World Championships before joining Leksands IF in May 2009. Lassen was named for the Danish team again in the 2010 IIHF World Championship. He scored the game-winning goal against USA in the preliminary round.

== Career statistics ==
=== Regular season and playoffs ===
			Regular season					Playoffs
Season	Team	League	GP	G	A	Pts	PIM	GP	G	A	Pts	PIM
2002–03	Herning Blue Fox	DEN	4	0	1	1	2	2	0	0	0	0
2003–04	Herning Blue Fox	DEN	20	0	1	1	8	—	—	—	—	—
2004–05	Frederikshavn White Hawks	DEN	36	2	2	4	24	14	2	2	4	6
2005–06	Herning Blue Fox	DEN	36	1	8	9	38	14	2	0	2	33
2006–07	Herning Blue Fox	DEN	36	2	3	5	22	15	1	6	7	10
2007–08	Herning Blue Fox	DEN	32	3	6	9	22	16	1	4	5	6
2008–09	Herning Blue Fox	DEN	44	6	14	20	34	—	—	—	—	—
2009–10	Leksands IF	Allsv	48	1	5	6	22	10	0	1	0	0
2010–11	Djurgårdens IF	SEL	43	2	1	3	22	2	0	0	0	0
2011–12	Malmö Redhawks	Allsv	50	2	6	8	28	6	0	1	1	4
2012–13	Malmö Redhawks	Allsv	50	1	2	3	42	—	—	—	—	—
2013–14	Graz 99ers	EBEL	46	5	10	15	46	—	—	—	—	—
2014–15	Graz 99ers	EBEL	41	4	12	16	16	—	—	—	—	—
2015–16	Lahti Pelicans	Liiga	53	3	10	13	71	9	1	1	2	14
2016–17	Lahti Pelicans	Liiga	43	2	8	10	32	5	0	0	0	12
2017–18	Lahti Pelicans	Liiga	41	0	7	7	32	2	0	1	1	0
2018–19	Almtuna IS	Allsv	51	0	5	5	40	—	—	—	—	—
DEN totals			208	14	35	49	150	77	9	17	26	61
SHL totals			43	2	1	3	22	2	0	0	0	0
Liiga totals			137	5	25	30	135	16	1	2	3	26
