= Peter Regin =

Danish ice hockey player (born 1986)

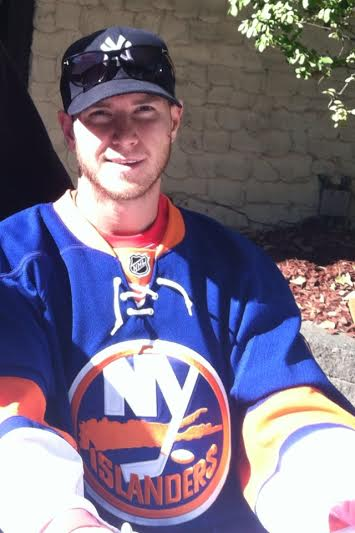
- Regin in October 2013 with the New York Islanders at Adventureland
- Born: 16 April 1986 (age 40) Herning, Denmark
- Height: 6 ft 2 in (188 cm)
- Weight: 205 lb (93 kg; 14 st 9 lb)
- Position: Centre
- Shot: Left
- Played for: Herning IK; Timrå IK; Ottawa Senators; New York Islanders; Chicago Blackhawks; Jokerit; HC Ambrì-Piotta; Eisbären Berlin
- National team: Denmark
- NHL draft: 87th overall, 2004; Ottawa Senators
- Playing career: 2002–2023

Peter Regin Jensen (born 16 April 1986) is a Danish former professional ice hockey player. He was drafted by the Ottawa Senators in the third round (87th overall) of the 2004 NHL entry draft and played his first five NHL seasons with the organization. Before his NHL career, he played professionally in Europe.

== Playing career ==
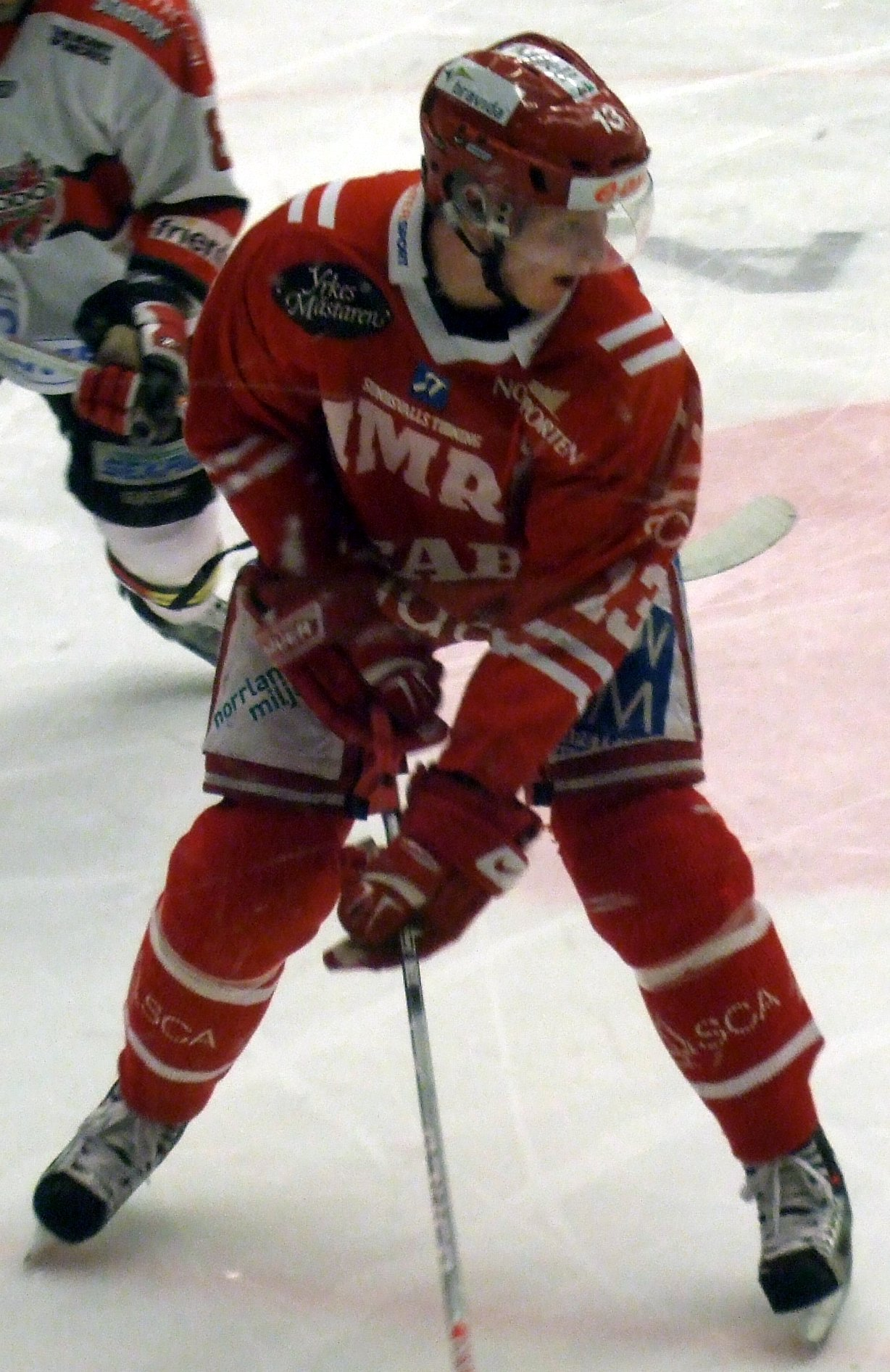
Regin with Timrå IK

Regin played for the Herning Blue Fox of the Danish Elite League from 2002 to 2005, winning Rookie of the Year honors in 2004. In 2004, he was drafted by the NHL's Ottawa Senators using the third-round draft pick of the Colorado Avalanche, received in a trade for Shane Hnidy with the Nashville Predators. He played one more season with Herning. In 2005, he joined Timrå IK in the Swedish Elitserien league. He played three seasons for Timrå, increasing his goal and point production each season.

On 2 June 2008, Regin signed a multi-year entry-level contract with the Ottawa Senators. He was assigned to the Senators' minor league affiliate, the Binghamton Senators for the 2008–09 season. Due to injuries in Ottawa, he was called up and made his NHL debut on 20 January 2009 in a game against the Washington Capitals. He was returned to Binghamton one day later, registering no points in his NHL debut. Following the NHL All-Star break, he was recalled by Ottawa and scored his first NHL goal, the game-winner, in his third NHL game on 29 January against Chris Mason and the St. Louis Blues.

Since beginning his NHL career, Regin has contributed to the rise in popularity of ice hockey in his native Denmark.

In July 2010, Regin was re-signed to a two-year contract extension worth US$2 million by the Senators.

Regin's 2010–11 season was a disappointing one as he registered only three goals and 17 points in 55 games before he suffered a season-ending shoulder dislocation in a game against the Toronto Maple Leafs when he was pushed into the boards by Toronto's Joey Crabb on 19 February 2011.

In April 2012, the Senators announced that Regin was re-signed to another one-year, one-way contract.

On 5 July 2013, Regin signed a one-year deal with the New York Islanders. However, he was traded on 6 February 2014 to the Chicago Blackhawks along with Pierre-Marc Bouchard in exchange for a 2014 fourth-round draft pick.

On 1 July 2014, Regin was re-signed by the Blackhawks to a one-year contract. During the Blackhawks' training camp, Regin was assigned, along with goaltender Michael Leighton, to their AHL affiliate, the Rockford IceHogs, after clearing waivers.

On 11 May 2015, Jokerit announced that it had agreed to terms with Regin on a two-year contract. On 11 November, Jokerit announced that they had re-signed Regin to a three-year contract extension.

Regin appeared for Jokerit in 262 regular season games, scoring 61 goals and 177 points. During his first five seasons with the club, he was the club's leading scorer in the KHL. He served as a captain in his last four seasons before leaving as a free agent. He later returned to the team on 19 September 2020, signing a one-year contract.

On 27 April 2021, Regin agreed to a one-year deal with HC Ambrì-Piotta of the National League (NL) for the 2021–22 season.

Regin moved to Germany for the following 2022–23 season, signing a one-year contract with Eisbären Berlin of the Deutsche Eishockey Liga (DEL). Playing in a depth role with Berlin, Regin posted just 3 goals and 8 points through 42 regular season games as Eisbären failed to qualify for the playoffs for the first time in 22 seasons. He left the club following the conclusion of his contract on 16 March 2023.

On 4 April 2023, Regin announced his retirement from professional hockey following 21 seasons.

== Career statistics ==
=== Regular season and playoffs ===
| | | | Regular season | | | | | Playoffs |
| Season | Team | League | GP | G | A | Pts | PIM | GP | G | A | Pts | PIM |
|---|---|---|---|---|---|---|---|---|---|---|---|---|
| 2001–02 | Herning IK | DEN U20 | — | — | — | — | — | — | — | — | — | — |
| 2001–02 | Herning IK II | DEN–2 | — | — | — | — | — | — | — | — | — | — |
| 2002–03 | Herning IK | DEN | 24 | 0 | 1 | 1 | 4 | 10 | 1 | 3 | 4 | 4 |
| 2003–04 | Herning IK | DEN | 33 | 9 | 11 | 20 | 14 | — | — | — | — | — |
| 2004–05 | Herning IK | DEN | 36 | 19 | 27 | 46 | 43 | 16 | 5 | 8 | 13 | 2 |
| 2005–06 | Timrå IK | SEL | 44 | 4 | 7 | 11 | 14 | — | — | — | — | — |
| 2005–06 | Timrå IK | J20 | — | — | — | — | — | 4 | 2 | 1 | 3 | 2 |
| 2006–07 | Timrå IK | SEL | 51 | 9 | 7 | 16 | 16 | 7 | 2 | 2 | 4 | 2 |
| 2007–08 | Timrå IK | SEL | 55 | 12 | 19 | 31 | 36 | 11 | 2 | 7 | 9 | 2 |
| 2008–09 | Binghamton Senators | AHL | 56 | 18 | 29 | 47 | 36 | — | — | — | — | — |
| 2008–09 | Ottawa Senators | NHL | 11 | 1 | 1 | 2 | 2 | — | — | — | — | — |
| 2009–10 | Ottawa Senators | NHL | 75 | 13 | 16 | 29 | 20 | 6 | 3 | 1 | 4 | 6 |
| 2010–11 | Ottawa Senators | NHL | 55 | 3 | 14 | 17 | 12 | — | — | — | — | — |
| 2011–12 | Ottawa Senators | NHL | 10 | 2 | 2 | 4 | 2 | — | — | — | — | — |
| 2012–13 | SC Langenthal | NLB | 4 | 2 | 3 | 5 | 2 | — | — | — | — | — |
| 2012–13 | Ottawa Senators | NHL | 27 | 0 | 3 | 3 | 8 | — | — | — | — | — |
| 2013–14 | New York Islanders | NHL | 44 | 2 | 5 | 7 | 18 | — | — | — | — | — |
| 2013–14 | Chicago Blackhawks | NHL | 17 | 2 | 2 | 4 | 2 | 5 | 0 | 0 | 0 | 0 |
| 2014–15 | Rockford IceHogs | AHL | 69 | 10 | 31 | 41 | 30 | 8 | 1 | 4 | 5 | 2 |
| 2014–15 | Chicago Blackhawks | NHL | 4 | 0 | 1 | 1 | 0 | — | — | — | — | — |
| 2015–16 | Jokerit | KHL | 60 | 17 | 31 | 48 | 32 | 6 | 2 | 4 | 6 | 4 |
| 2016–17 | Jokerit | KHL | 57 | 18 | 30 | 48 | 8 | 4 | 0 | 1 | 1 | 2 |
| 2017–18 | Jokerit | KHL | 56 | 8 | 23 | 31 | 26 | 11 | 1 | 5 | 6 | 0 |
| 2018–19 | Jokerit | KHL | 29 | 2 | 8 | 10 | 10 | 6 | 0 | 0 | 0 | 14 |
| 2019–20 | Jokerit | KHL | 60 | 16 | 24 | 40 | 26 | 6 | 2 | 2 | 4 | 4 |
| 2020–21 | Jokerit | KHL | 32 | 7 | 7 | 14 | 4 | 3 | 0 | 0 | 0 | 0 |
| 2021–22 | HC Ambrì–Piotta | NL | 41 | 3 | 20 | 23 | 6 | — | — | — | — | — |
| 2022–23 | Eisbären Berlin | DEL | 42 | 3 | 5 | 8 | 6 | — | — | — | — | — |
| NHL totals | | | 243 | 23 | 44 | 67 | 64 | 11 | 3 | 1 | 4 | 6 |
| KHL totals | | | 294 | 68 | 123 | 191 | 106 | 36 | 5 | 12 | 17 | 24 |

=== International ===
| Year | Team | Event | GP | G | A | Pts | PIM |
|---|---|---|---|---|---|---|---|
| 2002 | Denmark | WJC18 D1 | 4 | 2 | 0 | 2 | 22 |
| 2003 | Denmark | WJC D1 | 5 | 2 | 0 | 2 | 0 |
| 2003 | Denmark | WJC18 D1 | 5 | 0 | 2 | 2 | 6 |
| 2004 | Denmark | WJC D1 | 5 | 1 | 2 | 3 | 2 |
| 2004 | Denmark | WJC18 | 6 | 5 | 4 | 9 | 0 |
| 2005 | Denmark | WJC D1 | 5 | 2 | 4 | 6 | 12 |
| 2005 | Denmark | OGQ | 3 | 1 | 1 | 2 | 2 |
| 2005 | Denmark | WC | 6 | 0 | 3 | 3 | 0 |
| 2006 | Denmark | WJC D1 | 5 | 3 | 3 | 6 | 18 |
| 2006 | Denmark | WC | 6 | 0 | 0 | 0 | 8 |
| 2007 | Denmark | WC | 5 | 3 | 3 | 6 | 6 |
| 2008 | Denmark | WC | 6 | 2 | 1 | 3 | 4 |
| 2009 | Denmark | WC | 6 | 1 | 0 | 1 | 4 |
| 2010 | Denmark | WC | 7 | 2 | 5 | 7 | 6 |
| 2016 | Denmark | OGQ | 2 | 0 | 0 | 0 | 0 |
| 2017 | Denmark | WC | 7 | 2 | 1 | 3 | 4 |
| 2018 | Denmark | WC | 7 | 0 | 1 | 1 | 4 |
| 2019 | Denmark | WC | 7 | 0 | 1 | 1 | 0 |
| 2021 | Denmark | OGQ | 3 | 0 | 0 | 0 | 2 |
| 2022 | Denmark | OG | 5 | 1 | 0 | 1 | 2 |
| 2022 | Denmark | WC | 7 | 3 | 0 | 3 | 6 |
| Junior totals | | | 35 | 15 | 15 | 30 | 60 |
| Senior totals | | | 77 | 15 | 16 | 31 | 48 |
