= Jannik Hansen =

Danish ice hockey player (born 1986)

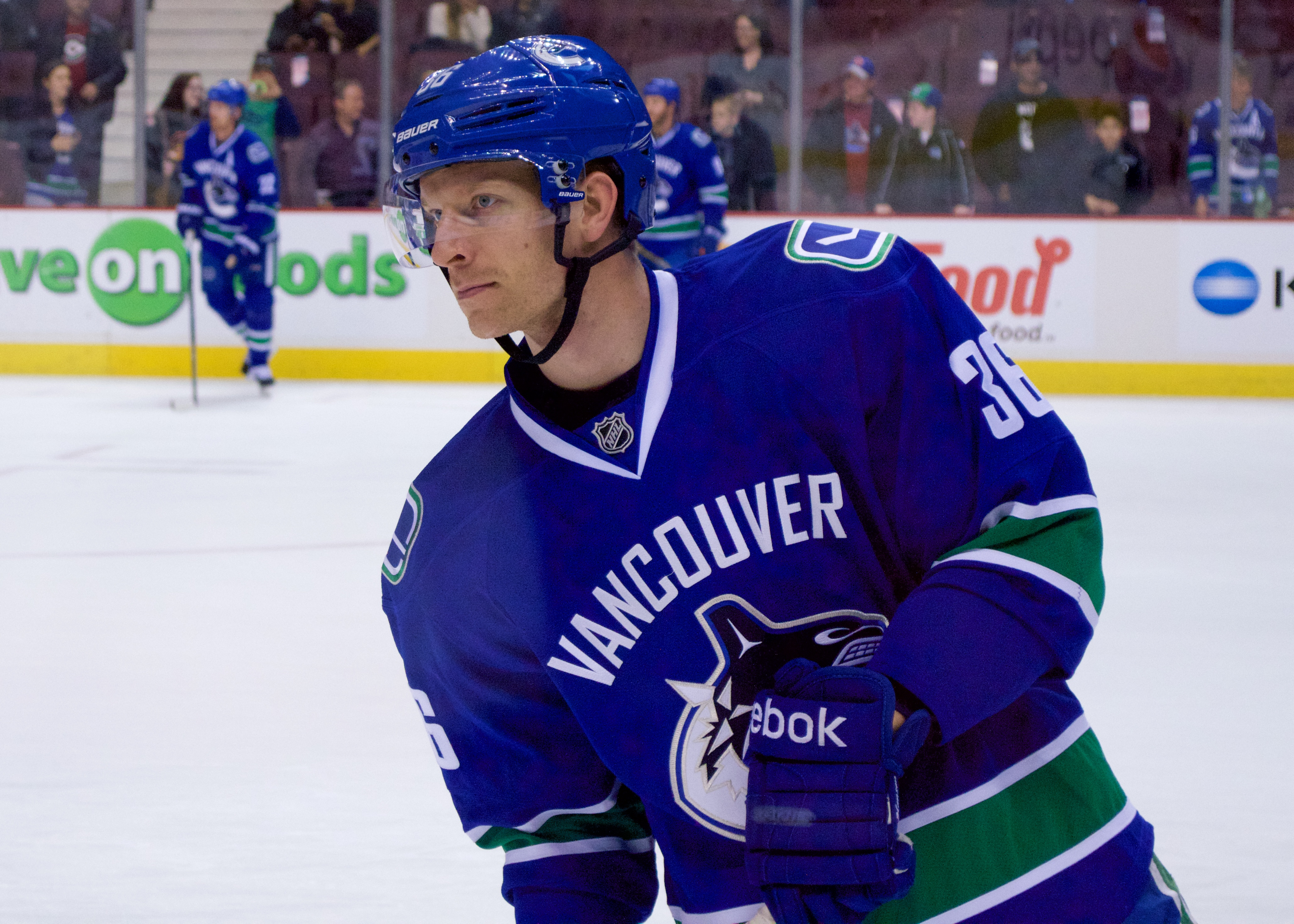
- Hansen with the Vancouver Canucks in October 2015
- Born: 15 March 1986 (age 40) Rødovre, Denmark
- Height: 6 ft 1 in (185 cm)
- Weight: 198 lb (90 kg; 14 st 2 lb)
- Position: Right wing
- Shot: Right
- Played for: Rødovre Mighty Bulls; Tappara; Vancouver Canucks; San Jose Sharks; CSKA Moscow
- National team: Denmark
- NHL draft: 287th overall, 2004; Vancouver Canucks
- Playing career: 2002–2019

Jannik Hansen (born 15 March 1986) is a Danish former professional ice hockey player. A right winger, Hansen began playing professionally at the age of 16 with both the Rødovre Mighty Bulls of the Danish league and the Malmö Redhawks of the Swedish J20 SuperElit and HockeyAllsvenskan leagues. He played three seasons with Rødovre, during which time he was selected 287th overall by the Canucks in the 2004 NHL entry draft. A year after his selection, he moved to North America to play major junior hockey with the Portland Winterhawks of the Western Hockey League (WHL) for one season. In 2006–07, Hansen began playing with the Canucks' minor league affiliate, the Manitoba Moose of the American Hockey League (AHL). That season, he was called up by the Vancouver Canucks and became the first Danish citizen to play and register a point in an NHL playoff game. After another campaign spent primarily with Manitoba, Hansen earned a full-time roster spot with the Canucks.

Internationally, Hansen has competed for the Danish national team in four World Championships. At the junior level, he represented Denmark in both Division I and main tournament play at the IIHF World U18 and U20 Championships.

== Personal life ==
Hansen was born and raised in Rødovre, Denmark, a suburb of Copenhagen. His father, Bent Hansen, was a carpenter and a member of the Danish national hockey team. Guided by his father, Hansen began skating at the age of two, but did not begin playing hockey until age 11. Growing up, hockey attracted a low-profile in Denmark (football is the country's national sport). At the time, no Dane had ever played in the NHL. Hansen has recalled neither he nor any of his peers ever having any realistic aspiration to make the NHL, describing "Everyone grew up wanting to play in Sweden, or Germany, or Finland" instead.

Hansen and his wife Karen had twin boys, Lucas and Daniel, on 3 March 2013.

== Playing career ==
=== Europe and junior ===
Hansen developed with the Rødovre Mighty Bulls of the Danish Oddset League, joined the senior team at age 16. He played in Rødovre for a season-and-a-half, then was invited to play for the Swedish Malmö Redhawks's under-18 team in 2002–03. Hansen played the remainder of the season in Malmö, then returned to Rødovre the following season. After recording 19 points over 35 games in 2003–04 with Rødovre, Hansen was selected by the Vancouver Canucks, 287th overall, in the 2004 NHL entry draft. Despite his success the previous season, his selection was delayed to the latter stages of the draft due to his small stature and a traditional lack of NHL players coming out of Denmark. Hansen stayed with Rødovre another season following his draft and recorded a Danish career-high 32 points in 34 games.

Selected by the Portland Winter Hawks of the Western Hockey League (WHL) 33rd overall in the 2005 Canadian Hockey League (CHL) Import Draft, Hansen moved to North America and joined the club for the 2005–06 season. Hansen's proficiency in English played a part in Winter Hawks general manager Ken Hodge selecting him. Canucks management also wanted him playing major junior in order to better his transition to the more physical North American style of play. Becoming the first Danish player to compete in the WHL, Hansen scored at a point-per-game pace, leading all rookies with 64 points. He continued his scoring pace in the playoffs with 13 points in 12 games as Portland was eliminated in the second round.

=== Vancouver Canucks ===
In July 2006, Hansen signed a three-year, entry-level contract with the Vancouver Canucks. Playing the 2006–07 season with the Canucks' minor league affiliate, the Manitoba Moose of the American Hockey League (AHL), he scored 12 goals and 34 points over 72 games, leading all team rookies in scoring.

During the 2007 Stanley Cup playoffs, Hansen was called up by the Canucks. He became the first born-and-raised Danish player to compete and register a point in the NHL post-season—Frans Nielsen had played and scored the first point by a born-and-raised Dane in the regular season earlier that year. (Note: Defenceman Poul Popiel, who was born in Denmark, but raised in Canada, scored his first NHL playoff goal in 1968 and his first regular season goal the following season.) The point was scored in Game 3 of the first round against the Dallas Stars by assisting on a goal by Jan Bulis. The Canucks advanced past the Stars in seven games to meet the Anaheim Ducks in the second round. In Game 5 of the series, with the Canucks facing elimination in overtime, Hansen played an instrumental part on the ice when the Ducks scored. Attempting to carry the puck out of the defensive zone, he was hit to the ice by Ducks forward Rob Niedermayer. While Canucks goaltender Roberto Luongo had his arm up in the direction of the referee, protesting the lack of penalty, the puck came loose to Ducks defenceman Scott Niedermayer, who scored past the distracted Luongo. Following the Canucks' elimination, Hansen was sent back to the Moose for their 2007 Calder Cup playoffs. Back in the AHL, he was pointless in six games as the Moose were defeated by the Hamilton Bulldogs in the second round.

The following season, Hansen was plagued by injuries, initially suffering a broken thumb in the pre-season with the Canucks. After recovering, he was assigned to the Moose in early-October, but was re-called by the Canucks within a month. In January 2008, Hansen was re-injured, suffering a concussion. Later in the campaign, he earned his second call-up of the season in April. Finishing the season with the Moose, he finished with 43 points in 50 games for the third-highest point-per-game average on the club, as well as a team-high plus-minus rating of +23. In NHL play, he was pointless in five games.

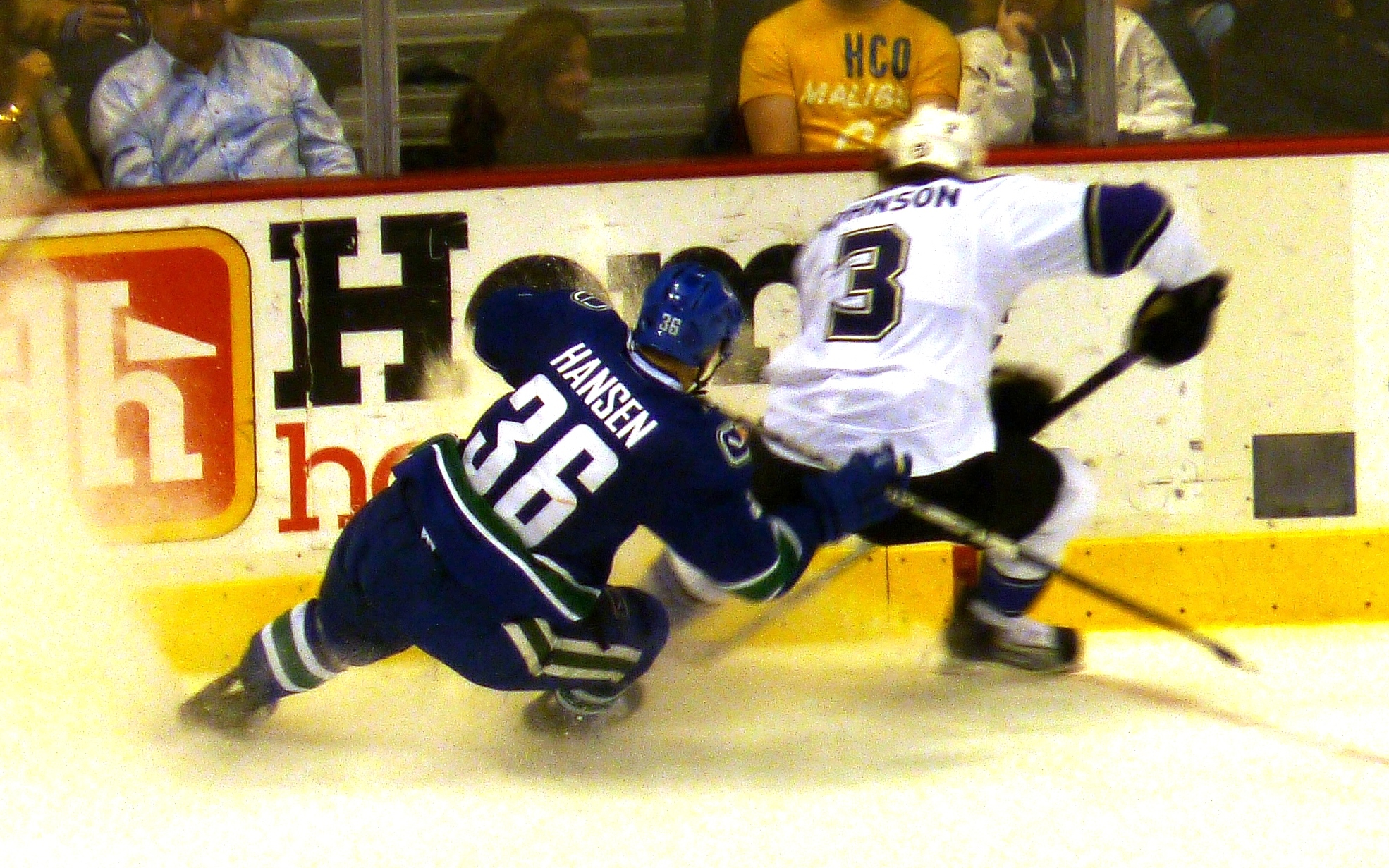
Hansen pursues Los Angeles Kings defenceman Jack Johnson along the boards in April 2010 in the first round of the 2010 Stanley Cup playoffs

Hansen played his first full season with the Canucks in 2008–09, making the roster out training camp and establishing himself as a third-line forward. He became known as a player for his speed and work ethic, lending to his effectiveness in puck-pursuit and forechecking. Also responsible defensively, he began to be used consistently on the penalty kill. Hansen has recalled the transition to the NHL requiring a change in his style of play to incorporate more physicality and abrasiveness. Prior to making the NHL, he relied more on skill and finesse, having been a go-to offensive player for teams up to that point.

Hansen scored his first NHL regular season point on 11 October 2008, an assist on a Ryan Kesler goal against the Calgary Flames. He scored his first NHL goal two games later against goaltender Chris Osgood in a 4–3 win against the Detroit Red Wings. Midway through the season, Hansen was briefly sent back to Manitoba for the Canucks to make room on the roster for the recently acquired Mats Sundin. He was, however, recalled within three days. In late-February, he broke his finger and was sidelined for 14 games. He completed the season with 21 points in 55 games, ranking 26th in scoring among NHL rookies. In the off-season, he became a restricted free agent before re-signing with the Canucks to a one-year, two-way contract worth a reported US$550,000.

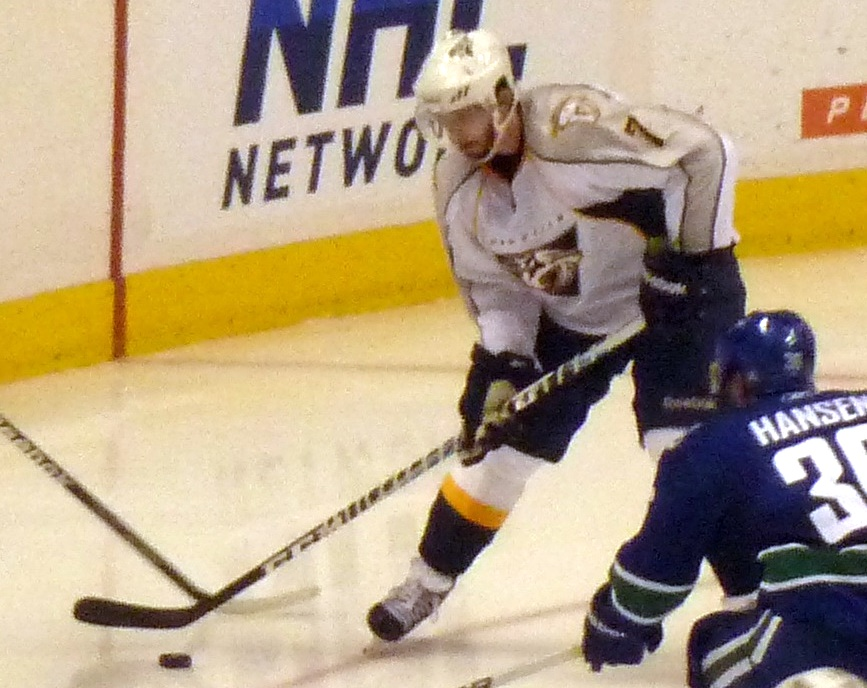
Hansen (right) forechecking against Jonathon Blum in April 2011 in the second round of the 2011 Stanley Cup playoffs

The following 2009 pre-season, Hansen injured his hand during a fight against Edmonton Oilers forward Gilbert Brulé, He returned to the lineup in mid-November 2008 after missing 19 games. On 1 January 2009, he was assigned for to the Moose for 10 days on a conditioning assignment, scoring two assists in five games. Back in Vancouver, Hansen completed the season with nine goals and 15 points over 47 games. He added three points in 12 playoff games, while playing through a sprained ankle suffered in the second round against the Chicago Blackhawks.

Becoming a restricted free agent for the second consecutive summer, Hansen was taken to salary arbitration by the Canucks. Following his hearing on 20 July 2010, he was awarded a one-year, one-way deal worth $850,000, which the Canucks agreed to. Recording career-highs of 9 goals, 20 assists and 29 points over 82 games in 2010–11, Hansen received the Canucks' Fred J. Hume Award as the team's "unsung hero" (voted by the Canucks' booster club). He added three goals and nine points over 25 games in the 2011 playoffs as the Canucks advanced to the Stanley Cup Finals, where they were defeated in seven games by the Boston Bruins. In the off-season, Hansen filed for salary arbitration. Prior to his hearing, Hansen and the Canucks avoided arbitration by agreeing to a three-year, $4.05 million contract. Many in the media, including those from the local Province newspaper, suggested that he ceded to the Canucks' negotiations, to which Hansen responded, "If you want to be in a position to win, you have to make some sacrifices."

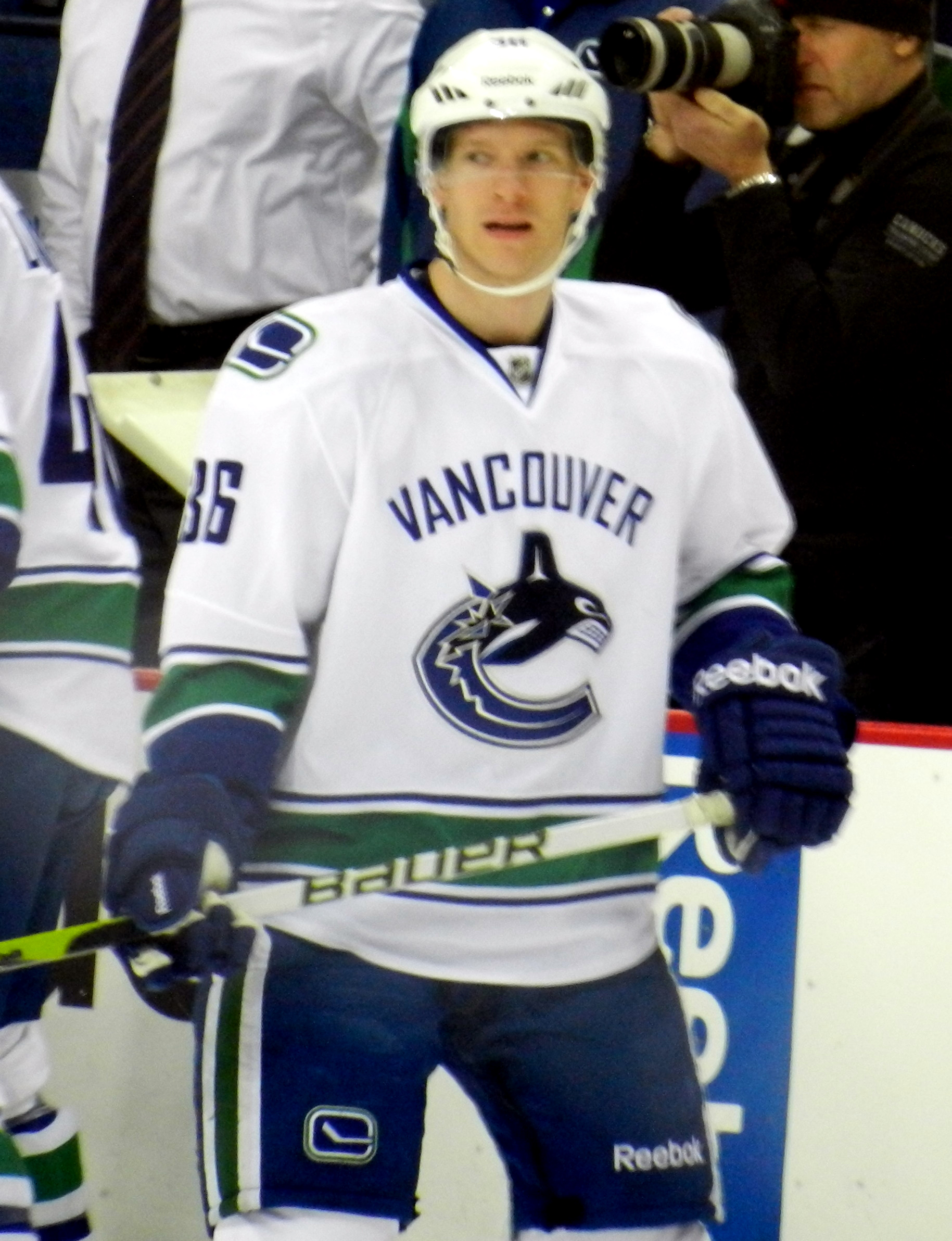
Hansen in December 2011

In the first month of the 2011–12 season, Hansen was hit from behind by defenceman Shea Weber in a game against the Nashville Predators on 20 October 2011. While he was uninjured on the play, Weber was fined $2,500 — the maximum allowable financial penalty — by the League the following day. The following month, Hansen earned a brief stint playing on the Canucks' first line with Daniel and Henrik Sedin, replacing Alexandre Burrows. Enjoying a career season, he surpassed his previous personal best of nine goals in the NHL by December 2011. He continued to play the majority of the campaign on the Canucks' checking line and finished with 16 goals and 39 points over 82 games. Although Vancouver won their second consecutive Presidents' Trophy in 2011–12, they lost in the first round of the playoffs to the Los Angeles Kings. Hansen had one goal in the five-game series.

Hansen earned praise from local and league-wide media amidst a strong start to the lockout-shortened 2012–13 season. On 19 February 2013, Hansen was given a one game suspension after a hit he laid on Marian Hossa in a 4–3 SO loss in a game against the Chicago Blackhawks. He finished the campaign scoring at the most prolific rate of his career, with 10 goals and 27 points over 47 games, ranking third in team scoring behind Daniel and Henrik Sedin. Playing the San Jose Sharks in the first round of the 2013 playoffs, Hansen failed to record a point in four games as the Canucks were swept.

On 29 September 2013, Hansen signed a four-year deal with the Canucks.

On 23 November 2014, Hansen recorded his first career hat-trick in a 4–1 victory over the Chicago Blackhawks.

Hansen spent much of the 2015–16 season playing on the Canucks' top line with the Sedin twins, following a 5–3 win over the Columbus Blue Jackets on 10 November 2015 which saw the line tally 11 points. Hansen responded by scoring a career-high 22 goals that season; scoring at least 20 goals for the first time in his career.

In the 2016 off-season, the Canucks signed free agent Loui Eriksson to be the Sedins' new linemate. As a result, Hansen started the 2016–17 season on the second line with Markus Granlund and Brandon Sutter. Hansen scored his 100th career NHL goal on 20 October 2016; against Robin Lehner in a 2–1 win over the Buffalo Sabres.

=== San Jose Sharks ===
On 28 February 2017, Hansen was traded by the Canucks to the San Jose Sharks in exchange for Nikolay Goldobin and a conditional 4th round-pick in the 2017 NHL entry draft. Hansen was placed on the Shark's top line with Joe Pavelski and Joe Thornton.

=== CSKA Moscow ===
On 2 August 2018, having reached the end of his 12-year NHL career, Hansen signed for Russian club, HC CSKA Moscow of the Kontinental Hockey League. In the 2018–19 season, Hansen continued to play his two-way defensively responsible role on the third line, contributing with 7 goals and 18 points in 45 games. In the playoffs, Hansen posted 3 points in 9 games to help CSKA claim their first Gagarin Cup.

On 27 April 2019, Hansen announced his retirement from professional hockey following 16 professional seasons, citing physical inability.

== International play ==
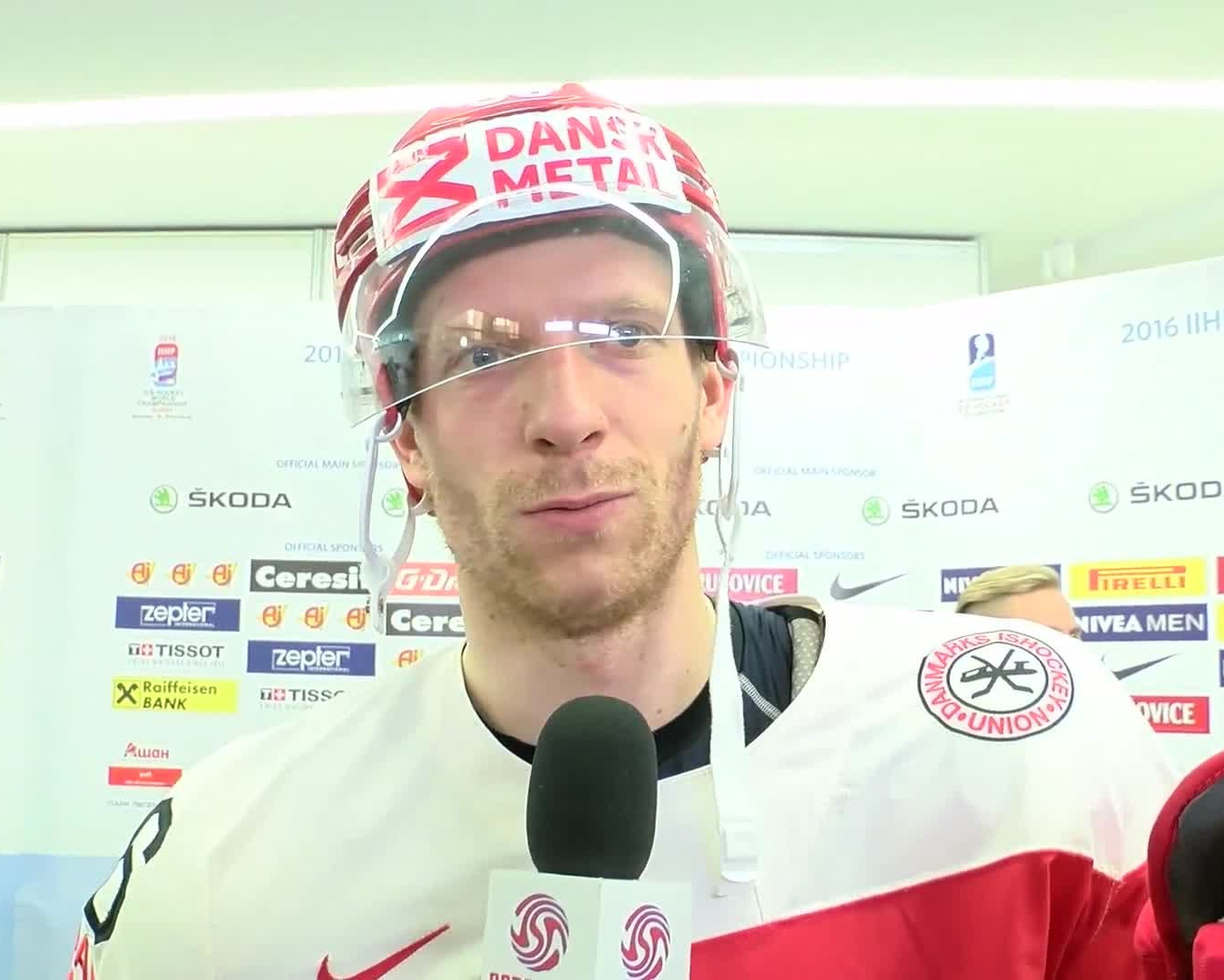
Hansen at the 2016 IIHF World Championship

Hansen made his international debut with Denmark in Division I play of the 2002 IIHF World U18 Championships, held in Slovenia. At 16 years old, he was the second-youngest player on the under-18 team; he went pointless in four games. Denmark narrowly avoided relegation to Division II, beating out Japan on goal-differential by one. At the 2003 IIHF World U18 Championships, Denmark finished first in their Division I group, earning a promotion to the main tournament for the following year. In Hansen's second tournament appearance, he tied for sixth in Group A scoring with seven points over five games.

Hansen advanced to the under-20 level, playing in Division I of the 2004 World Junior Championships, held in Berlin. He registered an assist in three games as Denmark finished second in their group to Germany, missing out on a promotion to the main tournament for the following year. He returned to the under-18 team for a third time later that year. Competing in the main tournament, Denmark finished in seventh place. Hansen scored seven points in six games, third in team-scoring. At the 2005 World Junior Championships, Hansen helped Denmark to a third-place finish in their five-team Division I group. He led his team with four goals and added an assist for five points over five games.

In February 2005, Hansen made his debut with the Danish men's team, competing in qualification play for the 2006 Winter Olympics. He notched an assist over three games as Denmark finished third in their group, failing to qualify for the Olympics. He returned to the men's team for the 2005 World Championships, going pointless in four games. Denmark finished in 14th place out of 16 teams.

The following year, Hansen made his third and final appearance for the under-20 team at the 2006 World Junior Championships. With four points in four games, he helped Denmark to a second-place finish in Group A of Division I play. Several months later, he competed in his second Men's World Championships in Riga, Latvia. Denmark finished in 13th place out of 16 teams in the top pool; Hansen scored twice in six games. He again joined the Danish national team in the 2008 World Championships, held in Quebec City and Halifax, Canada. He played in six games in the tournament, scoring two goals and adding two assists, as Denmark finished in 12th place. Hansen missed the opportunity to play in the 2010 World Championships after having sprained his ankle during the NHL playoffs with the Canucks.

Unavailable for the 2011 IIHF World Championship due to a run to the Stanley Cup Finals with the Canucks, Hansen rejoined Denmark the following year in Finland and Sweden. He was named Denmark's player of the game after recording four shots on goal in a 2–0 preliminary loss to the Czech Republic.

== Career statistics ==
=== Regular season and playoffs ===
			Regular season					Playoffs
Season	Team	League	GP	G	A	Pts	PIM	GP	G	A	Pts	PIM
2002–03	Rødovre Mighty Bulls	DNK	15	0	0	0	0	—	—	—	—	—
2002–03	MIF Redhawks	SWE U18	8	7	7	14	2	2	2	0	2	0
2002–03	MIF Redhawks	J20	4	1	0	1	0	1	0	0	0	0
2003–04	Rødovre Mighty Bulls	DNK	35	12	7	19	48	—	—	—	—	—
2004–05	Rødovre Mighty Bulls	DNK	32	17	17	34	40	5	3	1	4	24
2005–06	Portland Winter Hawks	WHL	64	24	40	64	67	12	7	6	13	16
2006–07	Manitoba Moose	AHL	72	12	22	34	38	6	0	0	0	2
2006–07	Vancouver Canucks	NHL	—	—	—	—	—	10	0	1	1	4
2007–08	Manitoba Moose	AHL	50	21	22	43	22	6	2	2	4	0
2007–08	Vancouver Canucks	NHL	5	0	0	0	2	—	—	—	—	—
2008–09	Manitoba Moose	AHL	2	1	0	1	2	—	—	—	—	—
2008–09	Vancouver Canucks	NHL	55	6	15	21	37	2	0	0	0	0
2009–10	Vancouver Canucks	NHL	47	9	6	15	18	12	1	2	3	4
2009–10	Manitoba Moose	AHL	5	0	2	2	5	—	—	—	—	—
2010–11	Vancouver Canucks	NHL	82	9	20	29	32	25	3	6	9	18
2011–12	Vancouver Canucks	NHL	82	16	23	39	34	5	1	0	1	14
2012–13	Tappara	SM-l	20	7	10	17	43	—	—	—	—	—
2012–13	Vancouver Canucks	NHL	47	10	17	27	8	4	0	0	0	2
2013–14	Vancouver Canucks	NHL	71	11	9	20	43	—	—	—	—	—
2014–15	Vancouver Canucks	NHL	81	16	17	33	27	6	2	2	4	0
2015–16	Vancouver Canucks	NHL	67	22	16	38	32	—	—	—	—	—
2016–17	Vancouver Canucks	NHL	28	6	7	13	27	—	—	—	—	—
2016–17	San Jose Sharks	NHL	15	2	5	7	7	6	0	1	1	0
2017–18	San Jose Sharks	NHL	46	2	12	14	15	—	—	—	—	—
2018–19	CSKA Moscow	KHL	45	7	11	18	12	9	1	2	3	2
NHL totals			626	109	147	256	282	70	7	12	19	42

=== International ===
Year	Team	Event	GP	G	A	Pts	PIM
2002	Denmark	WJC18 D1	4	0	0	0	2
2003	Denmark	WJC18 D1	5	2	5	7	14
2004	Denmark	WJC D1	3	0	1	1	12
2004	Denmark	WJC18	6	3	4	7	32
2005	Denmark	WJC D1	5	4	1	5	8
2005	Denmark	OGQ	3	0	1	1	4
2005	Denmark	WC	4	0	0	0	2
2006	Denmark	WJC D1	4	3	1	4	16
2006	Denmark	WC	6	2	0	2	6
2008	Denmark	WC	6	2	2	4	0
2012	Denmark	WC	6	0	2	2	29
2014	Denmark	WC	7	2	2	4	2
2016	Denmark	WC	8	2	2	4	2
2016	Denmark	OGQ	3	1	0	1	0
2016	Team Europe	WCH	6	0	1	1	0
2018	Denmark	WC	4	0	0	0	0
Junior totals			27	12	12	24	84
Senior totals			53	9	10	19	45

== Awards and honours ==
Award	Year
KHL
Gagarin Cup (CSKA Moscow)	2019
Vancouver Canucks
Fred J. Hume Award	2011, 2013, 2016
Pavel Bure Most Exciting Player Award	2013
