= 2025 Herlev municipal election =

Municipal election in Denmark

- 18 November 2025

All 19 seats to the Herlev municipal council 10 seats needed for a majority
- Turnout: 15,353 (64.2%) ▲0.9%
	First party	Second party	Third party
	A	F	C
Party	Social Democrats	Green Left	Conservatives
Last election	9 seats, 45.9%	2 seats, 10.1%	5 seats, 19.2%
Seats won	8	3	2
Seat change	▼1	▲1	▼3
Popular vote	5,801	2,061	2,041
Percentage	38.5%	13.7%	13.6%
Swing	▼7.3%	▲3.6%	▼5.6%
	Fourth party	Fifth party	Sixth party
	Ø	V	O
Party	Red-Green Alliance	Venstre	Danish People's Party
Last election	2 seats, 10.2%	0 seats, 3.0%	0 seats, 3.0%
Seats won	2	2	1
Seat change	0	▲2	▲1
Popular vote	1,688	960	855
Percentage	11.2%	6.4%	5.7%
Swing	▲1.1%	▲3.3%	▲2.7%
	Seventh party	Eighth party
	I	B
Party	Liberal Alliance	Social Liberals
Last election	0 seats, 1.0%	1 seat, 3.9%
Seats won	1	0
Seat change	▲1	▼1
Popular vote	853	533
Percentage	5.7%	3.5%
Swing	▲4.7%	▼0.3%
Mayor before election
Marco Damgaard
Social Democrats
Mayor after election
Marco Damgaard
Social Democrats

The 2025 Herlev Municipal election was held on November 18, 2025, to elect the 19 members to sit in the regional council for the Herlev Municipal council, in the period of 2026 to 2029. Marco Damgaard from the Social Democrats, would secure re-election.

== Background ==
Following the 2021 election, Thomas Gyldal Petersen from Social Democrats became mayor for third term. However, on December 4, 2024 it was revealed that he would step down as mayor, and Marco Damgaard would take over. Damgaard would run to continue as mayor.

== Electoral system ==
For elections to Danish municipalities, a number varying from 9 to 31 are chosen to be elected to the municipal council. The seats are then allocated using the D'Hondt method and a closed list proportional representation. Herlev Municipality had 19 seats in 2025.

== Electoral alliances ==
=== Electoral Alliance 1 ===
Party		Political alignment
B	Social Liberals	Centre to Centre-left
F	Green Left	Centre-left to Left-wing
Ø	Red-Green Alliance	Left-wing to Far-Left

=== Electoral Alliance 2 ===
Party		Political alignment
I	Liberal Alliance	Centre-right to Right-wing
M	Moderates	Centre to Centre-right
O	Danish People's Party	Right-wing to Far-right
V	Venstre	Centre-right

== Results by polling station ==
Division	A	B	C	F	I	M	O	V	Ø
Division	%	%	%	%	%	%	%	%	%
Herlev Medborgerhus	37.3	4.4	10.9	15.2	5.6	1.5	5.3	6.7	13.1
Herlev Hallerne	42.0	3.3	17.1	11.7	6.3	1.3	5.0	5.6	7.7
Kildegårdhallen	36.1	2.9	12.7	14.2	5.0	2.4	6.9	6.9	13.0

== Results ==
Party		Votes	%	+/-	Seats	+/-
Herlev Municipality
A	Social Democrats	5,801	38.55	-7.30	8	-1
F	Green Left	2,061	13.70	+3.62	3	+1
C	Conservatives	2,041	13.56	-5.59	2	-3
Ø	Red-Green Alliance	1,688	11.22	+1.07	2	0
V	Venstre	960	6.38	+3.33	2	+2
O	Danish People's Party	855	5.68	+2.71	1	+1
I	Liberal Alliance	853	5.67	+4.70	1	+1
B	Social Liberals	533	3.54	-0.33	0	-1
M	Moderates	256	1.70	New	0	New
Total		15,048	100	N/A	19	N/A
Invalid votes		80	0.33	+0.03		
Blank votes		225	0.94	+0.26		
Turnout		15,353	64.17	+0.90		
Source: valg.dk

== Opinion polls ==
Polling firm	Fieldwork date	Sample size	A	C	Ø	F	B	V	O	I	M	Lead
Epinion	4 Sep - 13 Oct 2025	543	48.8	10.6	7.5	12.0	2.4	7.0	4.3	7.4	0.1	36.8
2024 european parliament election	9 Jun 2024		19.5	9.6	10.1	19.0	7.2	8.8	7.5	5.8	6.5	0.5
2022 general election	1 Nov 2022		33.8	5.8	6.8	9.4	3.8	8.2	3.4	6.3	9.8	24.0
2021 regional election	16 Nov 2021		37.7	17.9	9.6	10.4	5.5	6.4	3.8	1.4	–	19.8
2021 municipal election	16 Nov 2021		45.9 (9)	19.2 (5)	10.2 (2)	10.1 (2)	3.9 (1)	3.0 (0)	3.0 (0)	1.0 (0)	–	26.7
