= 2021 Herlev municipal election =

← 2017	16 November 2021	2025 →

All 19 seats to the Herlev Municipal Council 10 seats needed for a majority
- Turnout: 14,106 (63.3%) ▼5.4pp
	First party	Second party	Third party
	A	C	Ø
Party	Social Democrats	Conservatives	Red–Green Alliance
Last election	12 seats, 57.2%	2 seats, 10.7%	2 seats, 7.6%
Seats won	9	5	2
Seat change	▼3	▲3	0
Popular vote	6,355	2,655	1,407
Percentage	45.8%	19.2%	10.2%
Swing	▼11.4%	▲8.5%	▲2.6%
	Fourth party	Fifth party	Sixth party
	F	B	V
Party	Green Left	Social Liberals	Venstre
Last election	1 seat, 6.6%	0 seats, 2.7%	1 seat, 4.9%
Seats won	2	1	0
Seat change	▲1	▲1	▼1
Popular vote	1,396	536	422
Percentage	10.1%	3.9%	3.0%
Swing	▲3.5%	▲1.2%	▼1.9%
	Seventh party
	O
Party	Danish People's Party
Last election	1 seat, 7.2%
Seats won	0
Seat change	▼1
Popular vote	412
Percentage	3.0%
Swing	▼4.2%
Mayor before election
Thomas Gyldal Petersen
Social Democrats
Mayor after election
Thomas Gyldal Petersen
Social Democrats

Since 1970, the Social Democrats had held the mayor's position in the municipality. They had at least since 1981 had an absolute majority of seats added to that.

In the last election, they won 12 of the 19 seats, and Thomas Gyldal Petersen would therefore go into his third full term as mayor. (Note: he took over in 2001 from Kjeld Hansen)

In this election, however, they would lose their absolute majority. Only one party from the blue bloc would win representation though, and 14 of the 19 seats would be for parties of the traditional red bloc. There would be majority with all the elected red bloc parties, that would support Thomas Gyldal Petersen as mayor.

This election would be one of only four, where Venstre failed to win representation.

== Electoral system ==
For elections to Danish municipalities, a number varying from 9 to 31 are chosen to be elected to the municipal council. The seats are then allocated using the D'Hondt method and a closed list proportional representation. Herlev Municipality had 19 seats in 2021.

Unlike in Danish General Elections, in elections to municipal councils, electoral alliances are allowed.

== Electoral alliances ==
=== Electoral Alliance 1 ===
Party		Political alignment
C	Conservatives	Centre-right
D	New Right	Right-wing to Far-right
I	Liberal Alliance	Centre-right to Right-wing
O	Danish People's Party	Right-wing to Far-right
V	Venstre	Centre-right

=== Electoral Alliance 2 ===
Party		Political alignment
B	Social Liberals	Centre to Centre-left
F	Green Left	Centre-left to Left-wing
Ø	Red–Green Alliance	Left-wing to Far-Left

== Results by polling station ==
H = Herlev Listen

Division	A	B	C	D	F	H	I	K	O	V	Ø
Division	%	%	%	%	%	%	%	%	%	%	%
Herlev Medborgerhus	45.9	4.5	16.2	2.3	12.2	0.8	1.3	0.6	3.7	2.9	9.6
Herlev Hallerne	47.8	3.0	23.3	2.2	8.6	0.3	0.9	0.7	2.4	2.9	8.0
Kildegårdhallen	43.6	4.2	17.6	3.1	9.5	1.3	0.7	0.5	2.9	3.4	13.2

== Results ==
Party		Votes	%	+/-	Seats	+/-
Herlev Municipality
A	Social Democrats	6,355	45.85	-11.34	9	-3
C	Conservatives	2,655	19.16	+8.44	5	+3
Ø	Red-Green Alliance	1,407	10.15	+2.55	2	0
F	Green Left	1,396	10.07	+3.43	2	+1
B	Social Liberals	536	3.87	+1.20	1	+1
V	Venstre	422	3.04	-1.86	0	-1
O	Danish People's Party	412	2.97	-4.23	0	-1
D	New Right	349	2.52	New	0	New
I	Liberal Alliance	134	0.97	+0.20	0	0
H	Herlev Listen	109	0.79	New	0	New
K	Christian Democrats	84	0.61	New	0	New
Total		13,859	100	N/A	19	N/A
Invalid votes		68	0.31	0.0		
Blank votes		179	0.80	+0.25		
Turnout		14,106	63.27	-5.42		
Source: valg.dk
