= Thor Dresler =

Danish ice hockey player

- Born: March 10, 1979 (age 46) Herlev, Denmark
- Height: 6 ft 2 in (188 cm)
- Weight: 207 lb (94 kg; 14 st 11 lb)
- Position: Forward
- Shot: Left
- Played for: Herlev Eagles; Hvidovre IK; Gislaveds IK; IF Troja-Ljungby; IFK Arboga IK; Odense Bulldogs; Herning Blue Fox
- National team: Denmark
- Playing career: 1998–2013

Thor Dresler (born 10 March 1979 in Herlev) is a Danish former professional ice hockey player and current ice hockey coach who participated at the 2010 IIHF World Championship as a member of the Denmark National men's ice hockey team.

== Career statistics ==
			Regular season					Playoffs
Season	Team	League	GP	G	A	Pts	PIM	GP	G	A	Pts	PIM
1995–96	Herlev Ishockey	Denmark2	—	22	18	40	—	—	—	—	—	—
1996–97	Herlev Ishockey	Denmark2	—	28	26	54	—	—	—	—	—	—
1997–98	Herlev Ishockey	Denmark2	—	41	39	80	—	—	—	—	—	—
1998–99	Hvidovre IK	Denmark	42	10	8	18	10	—	—	—	—	—
1999–00	Herlev Eagles	Denmark	43	30	25	55	24	—	—	—	—	—
2000–01	Herlev Eagles	Denmark	28	10	16	26	0	—	—	—	—	—
2001–02	Gislaveds SK	Allsvenskan	45	11	12	23	8	—	—	—	—	—
2002–03	IF Troja-Ljungby	Allsvenskan	42	10	15	25	20	—	—	—	—	—
2003–04	Herlev Eagles	Denmark	32	6	12	18	12	—	—	—	—	—
2004–05	Herlev Eagles	Denmark	35	9	16	25	18	7	2	5	7	12
2005–06	Herlev Hornets	Denmark	23	2	5	7	14	—	—	—	—	—
2005–06	IFK Arboga IK	HockeyAllsvenskan	9	1	3	4	8	—	—	—	—	—
2006–07	Herlev Hornets	Denmark	32	7	15	22	16	—	—	—	—	—
2007–08	Odense Bulldogs	Denmark	43	6	13	19	14	11	1	1	2	2
2008–09	Herning Blue Fox	Denmark	38	10	15	25	16	16	6	2	8	6
2009–10	Herning Blue Fox	Denmark	34	12	16	28	8	12	0	7	7	4
2010–11	Hvidovre Ligahockey	Denmark	38	10	18	28	18	4	2	1	3	4
2011–12	Herlev Eagles	Denmark	27	4	11	15	22	4	1	2	3	2
2012–13	Herlev Eagles	Denmark	37	7	15	22	12	4	1	0	1	4
Denmark totals			452	123	185	308	184	58	13	18	31	34
