= Michael Madsen (ice hockey) =

Danish ice hockey player

- Born: 20 November 1980 (age 45) Haderslev, Denmark
- Height: 5 ft 10 in (178 cm)
- Weight: 185 lb (84 kg; 13 st 3 lb)
- Position: Goaltender
- Caught: Left
- Played for: Vojens IK; Hvidovre Ligahockey; Rungsted Cobras; Herlev Hornets; Rødovre Mighty Bulls
- National team: Denmark
- Playing career: 1997–2014

Michael Madsen (born 20 November 1980) is a Danish former professional ice hockey goaltender.

== Career ==
Madsen has served as backup goaltender to Peter Hirsch on the Danish national team in several World Championships, as well as several Danish teams in regular season play. On 31 January 2007, he signed with Vaasan Sport in the Finnish Mestis. For the 2007–08 season, Madsen played for the Rødovre Mighty Bulls.
