= Klemen Mohorič =

- Born: May 25, 1975 (age 50) Bled, Yugoslavia
- Height: 5 ft 11 in (180 cm)
- Weight: 171 lb (78 kg; 12 st 3 lb)
- Position: Goaltender
- Caught: Left
- Played for: Johnstown Chiefs; Louisville RiverFrogs; HDD Olimpija Ljubljana; HK Acroni Jesenice; HK Slavija Ljubljana
- Current KHL coach: HC Metallurg Magnitogorsk
- Coached for: Metallurg Magnitogorsk
- National team: Slovenia
- NHL draft: undrafted
- Playing career: 1996–2008

Klemen "Klem" Mohoric (slov. Klemen "Klem" Mohorič;born May 25, 1975) is a retired Slovenian professional ice hockey goaltender. He spent the majority of his career with the HDD Olimpija Ljubljana of the Slovenian Ice Hockey Championship. Currently the goalkeeper coach at HC Metallurg Magnitogorsk (KHL).

== Playing career ==
Mohorič started his professional hockey career during the 1996–97 ECHL season. He signed with the Louisville RiverFrogs on October 26, 1996. In ten games with the Riverfrogs, he went 0–6–2 with a 4.74 GAA. He would later be moved to the Johnstown Chiefs that season. Mohorič would make 15 appearances with the Chiefs, going 5–5–1.

Mohorič would return home to play for the Slovenian team Olimpija Ljubljana in 1997, who at the time played in the Slovenian Ice Hockey Championship. Olimpija would finish the season as Slovenian Champions during each of Mohorič's season until 2003. Mohorič would leave the team in 2003 to play for Merano, a Serie A team that played in the top tier of Italy's professional hockey league.

Mohorič returned to Ljubljana to play for HK Slavija Ljubljana, where he would spend one season before returning to Olimpija Ljubljana. After three seasons with Olimpija, Mohorič retired after the 2007–08 season.

== Awards and accomplishments ==
- 1991-92 Slovenian Champion, HK Acroni Jesenice
- 1992-93 Slovenian Champion, HK Acroni Jesenice
- 1993-94 Slovenian Champion, HK Acroni Jesenice
- 1994-95 Slovenian Champion, HK Acroni Jesenice
- 1997-98 Slovenian Champion, Olimpija Ljubljana
- 1998-99 Slovenian Champion, Olimpija Ljubljana
- 1999-00 Slovenian Champion, Olimpija Ljubljana
- 2000-01 Slovenian Champion, Olimpija Ljubljana
- 2000-01 IIHF Men's World Ice Hockey Championships Gold Medal (Division 1, Group B), Team Slovenia
- 2001-02 Slovenian Champion, Olimpija Ljubljana
- 2002-03 Slovenian Champion, Olimpija Ljubljana
- 2006-07 Slovenian Champion, Olimpija Ljubljana

== Personal ==
Mohorič is now a distribution agent for the hockey company Torspo in his hometown of Bled.
