= Herbert Pöck =

Austrian ice hockey player

Personal information
- Nationality: Austrian
- Born: 8 March 1957 (age 69) Klagenfurt, Austria

Sport
- Sport: Ice hockey

Herbert Pöck (born 8 March 1957) is an Austrian ice hockey player. He competed in the men's tournaments at the 1976 Winter Olympics, the 1984 Winter Olympics and the 1988 Winter Olympics.
