= 1985–86 Eliteserien (Denmark) season =

Danish ice hockey league season

The 1985–86 Eliteserien season was the 29th season of ice hockey in Denmark, and the first season of the Eliteserien. Seven teams participated in the league, and the Rødovre Mighty Bulls won the championship. Hellerup IK was relegated to the 1. division.

== First round ==
	Club	GP	W	T	L	GF	GA	Pts
1.	Esbjerg IK	24	16	2	6	124	89	34
2.	Frederikshavn White Hawks	24	15	4	5	122	81	34
3.	Rødovre Mighty Bulls	24	14	1	9	106	90	29
4.	Herlev IK	24	12	3	9	108	89	27
5.	Herning IK	24	8	4	12	104	111	20
6.	Vojens IK	24	5	3	16	70	120	13
7.	Hellerup IK	24	3	5	16	82	136	11

== Final round ==
	Club	GP	W	T	L	GF	GA	Pts
1.	Rødovre Mighty Bulls	6	6	0	0	25	13	13
2.	Esbjerg IK	6				22	20	9
3.	Frederikshavn White Hawks	6				17	19	6
4.	Herlev IK	6				16	28	2

== Qualification round ==
Team	Pts
Herning IK	11
Vojens IK	10
Rungsted IK	6
Gladsaxe SF	3
