= Kim Staal =

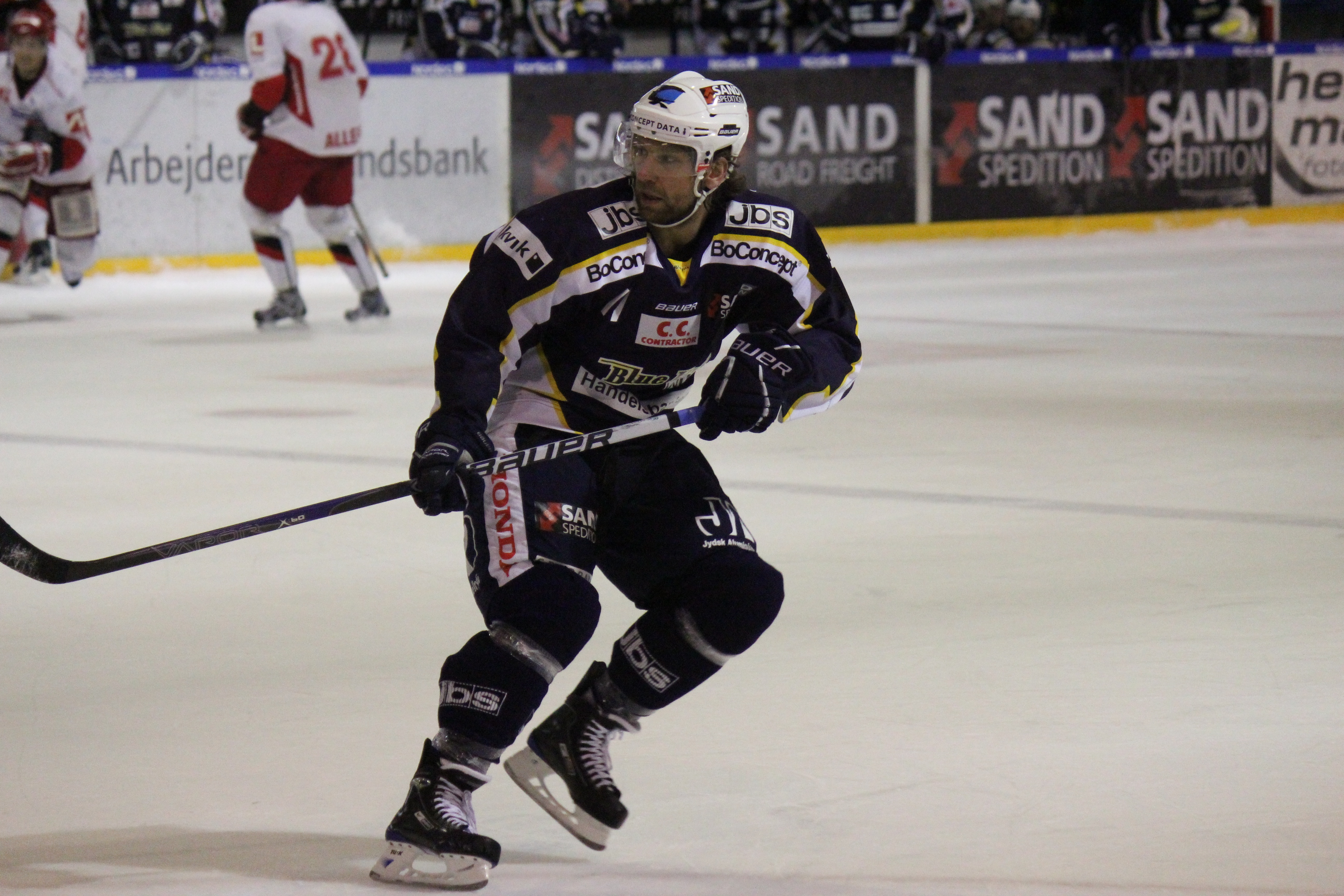
- Born: 10 March 1978 (age 48) Herlev, Denmark
- Height: 6 ft 0 in (183 cm)
- Weight: 192 lb (87 kg; 13 st 10 lb)
- Position: Right wing
- Shot: Right
- Played for: Malmö Redhawks; Modo Hockey; Milwaukee Admirals; Linköpings HC; HV71; Herning Blue Fox; Herlev Eagles; Starbulls Rosenheim; Tohoku Free Blades
- National team: Denmark
- NHL draft: 92nd overall, 1996; Montreal Canadiens
- Playing career: 1996–2019

Kim Staal (born 10 March 1978) is a Danish former professional ice hockey forward, who last played with Herlev Eagles.

Despite his surname, he is not related to the Staal family of Thunder Bay, Ontario, Canada, which consists of hockey playing brothers Eric, Marc, Jordan and Jared, who are Canadians of Dutch descent.

== Playing career ==
Staal was drafted by the Montreal Canadiens as their fourth-round pick in the 1996 NHL entry draft. He spent his early professional career in the Swedish elite league, playing for Malmö IF and Modo Hockey. Staal also played in the Denmark national ice hockey team and participated in twelve Ice Hockey World Championships between 2003 and 2015. In 2006, he signed with the Milwaukee Admirals of the AHL. He signed with Linköpings HC in July 2007 and with HV71 on 19 June, for one season. After an injury-prone season with HV71, he signed with Malmö Redhawks in HockeyAllsvenskan.

Staal was often popular with fans and teammates due to his outgoing nature and sense of humour. In Sweden, his nickname is "Staalmannen", which literally means "man of steel". Stålmannen is also the Swedish name for Superman.

== Awards ==
- Named to the Elitserien All-Star Game in 2001 and 2002.
- Elitserien silver medal in 2002, 2008 and 2009.

== Career statistics ==
			Regular season					Playoffs
Season	Team	League	GP	G	A	Pts	PIM	GP	G	A	Pts	PIM
1996–97	Malmö IF	SEL	4	0	1	1	2	—	—	—	—	—
1997–98	Malmö IF	SEL	13	0	1	1	2	—	—	—	—	—
1998–99	Malmö IF	SEL	48	1	5	6	14	4	0	0	0	0
1999–00	Malmö IF	SEL	50	14	10	24	24	—	—	—	—	—
2000–01	Malmö IF	SEL	48	16	15	31	32	9	4	2	6	4
2001–02	Modo Hockey	SEL	49	14	23	37	16	12	3	7	10	2
2002–03	Modo Hockey	SEL	14	4	5	9	4	6	1	0	1	0
2003–04	MIF Redhawks	SEL	45	15	8	23	14	—	—	—	—	—
2004–05	Malmö Redhawks	SEL	34	10	11	21	12	—	—	—	—	—
2006–07	Milwaukee Admirals	AHL	64	13	12	25	34	4	0	1	1	2
2007–08	Linköpings HC	SEL	51	12	8	20	30	16	5	5	10	4
2008–09	HV71	SEL	8	1	5	6	0	18	2	4	6	10
SEL totals			364	87	92	179	150	65	15	18	33	20
AHL totals			64	13	12	25	34	4	0	1	1	2

== International play ==
Staal has played for Denmark in the following competitions:

- 2003 World Championships
- 2004 World Championships
- 2005 World Championships
- 2006 World Championships
- 2007 World Championships
- 2008 World Championships
- 2009 World Championships
- 2010 World Championships
- 2011 World Championships
- 2013 World Championships
- 2014 World Championships
- 2015 World Championships

=== International statistics ===
Year	Team	Event	GP	G	A	Pts	PIM
2003	Denmark	WC	5	2	3	5	6
2004	Denmark	WC	6	3	1	4	4
2005	Denmark	WC	1	0	0	0	0
2006	Denmark	WC	6	5	1	6	2
2007	Denmark	WC	5	2	3	5	2
2008	Denmark	WC	6	4	2	6	2
Senior int'l totals			29	16	10	26	16
