= 1983–84 Danish 1. division season =

Danish ice hockey season

The 1983–84 Danish 1. division season was the 27th season of ice hockey in Denmark. Eight teams participated in the league, and Herlev IK won the championship.

== Regular season ==
	Club	GP	W	T	L	GF	GA	Pts
1.	Herlev IK	28	21	2	5	168	99	44
2.	AaB Ishockey	28	20	2	6	175	91	42
3.	Rungsted IK	28	17	3	8	133	103	37
4.	Rødovre Mighty Bulls	28	15	4	9	133	97	34
5.	Vojens IK	28	14	2	12	124	110	30
6.	Hellerup IK	28	11	1	16	131	162	23
7.	KSF Copenhagen	28	4	3	21	82	162	11
8.	Esbjerg IK	28	1	1	26	31	153	3

== Playoffs ==
The top four teams from the regular season qualified for the playoffs. Herlev IK defeated AaB Ishockey in the final, and Rungsted IK defeated the Rødovre Mighty Bulls in the 3rd place game.
