= Herlev =

Suburb of Copenhagen, Denmark

Coordinates: 55°43′30″N 12°26′15″E

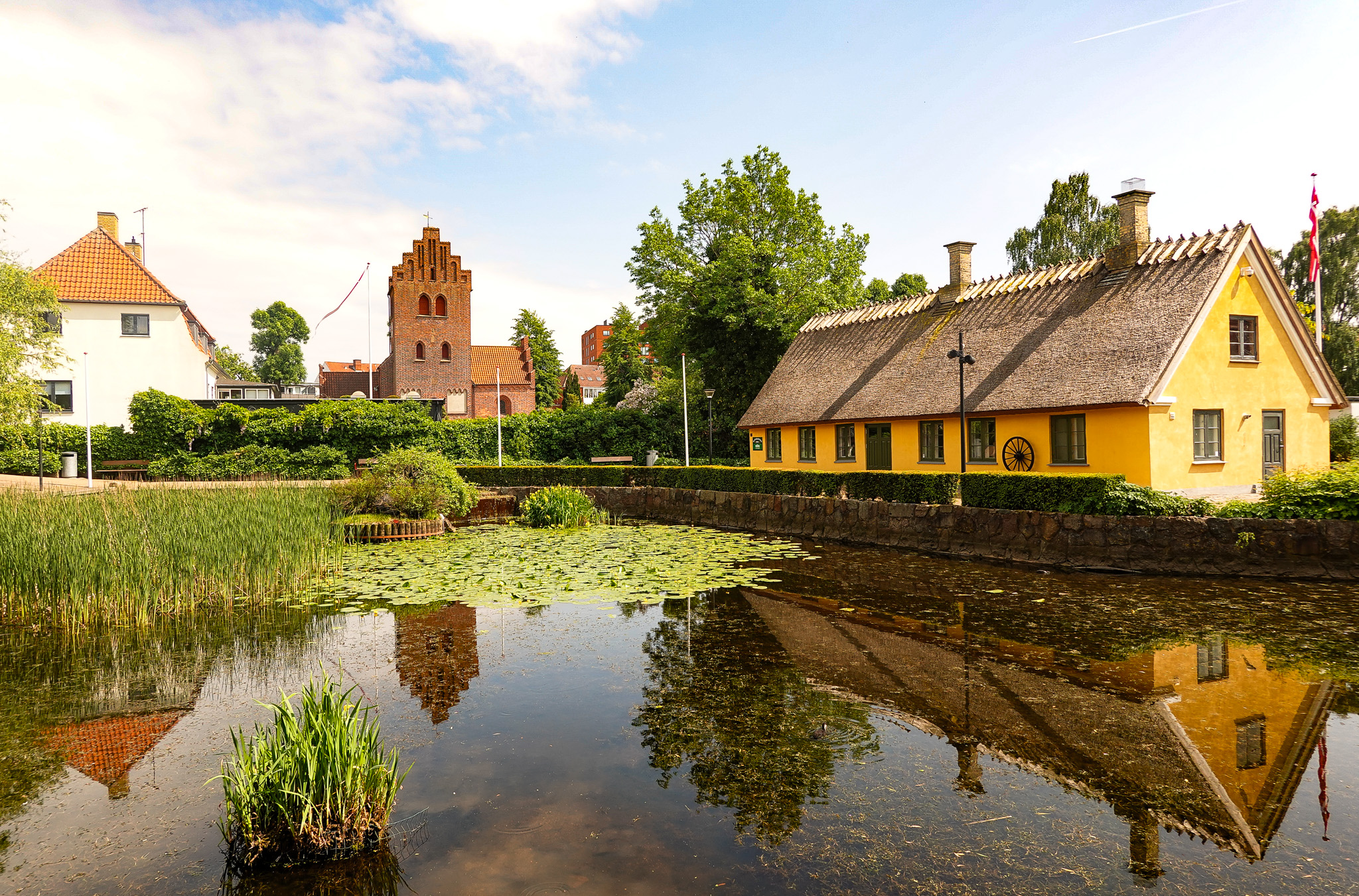
The historic centre of Herlev, with the church and the village pond

Herlev is a suburb about 11 km northwest of Copenhagen city centre, bordering Rødovre to the south, Ballerup to the west and Gladsaxe to the north. It is the site of the municipal council of Herlev Municipality, Denmark.

== Sports ==
Herlev is the hometown of former Vancouver Canuck Jannik Hansen. Herlev is known for its hockey team, the Herlev Hornets.

== History ==
Herlev Church, Skt. Laurentii, was built around 1450 and is named after Saint Lawrence, a Christian martyr who was put to death by being placed on a gridiron over hot coals. The Herlev city coat of arms bears the symbol of a gridiron for that reason.

== Landmarks ==
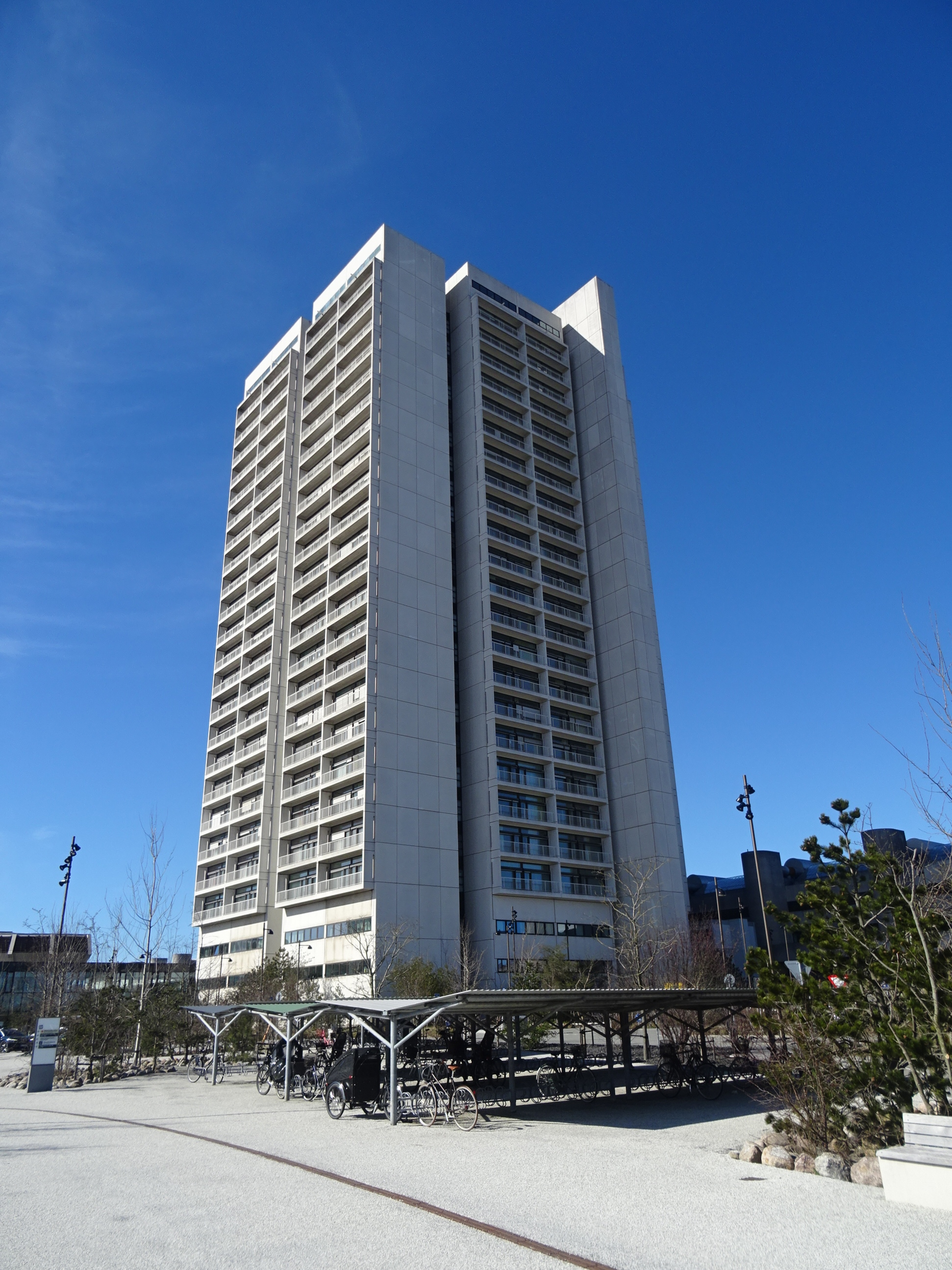
Herlev Hospital

Herlev Hospital is 120 metres (390 ft) in height. It was famous for being Denmark's tallest building, until 2022, when it was surpassed by the Aarhus Lighthouse and the Pasteurs Tower. It is the twenty-sixth tallest hospital in the world. Its modern, functional architecture in bright concrete, glass and bronze-coloured aluminium gives a unique impression. Construction began in 1965 and the hospital was finished in 1975. It was opened in 1976. In 2021, the new emergency room and paediatric centre were opened by Crown Princess Mary, the Danish Minister of Health Magnus Heunicke, and Sophie Hæstorp Andersen, chairman of the Region Hovedstaden.

There are several small, independent museums around Herlev, one of which is the Gammelgaard Art and Culture Center, which is owned and operated by Herlev Municipality and which houses various exhibitions of Danish and international contemporary art.

== Transport ==
Herlev train station serves the central part of Herlev. It is part of the S-train line to Ballerup / Frederikssund. Local buses from the bus terminal outside the train station provide connections to more remote areas of the municipality. The Greater Copenhagen Light Rail will serve the area, including the railway station and the city hall, when it completes construction in 2026.

== Notable people ==
- Lars Lilholt (born 1953), a Danish singer, violinist, guitarist and composer
- Anita Lerche (born 1973), a singer-songwriter, composer and actress, grew up in Herlev
- Niclas Genckel Petersen (born 1980) and Jannik Brandt Thomsen make up Nik & Jay, a Danish hip-hop/pop duo
- Mette Lindberg (born 1983), a Danish vocalist, part of The Asteroids Galaxy Tour, a psychedelic pop group

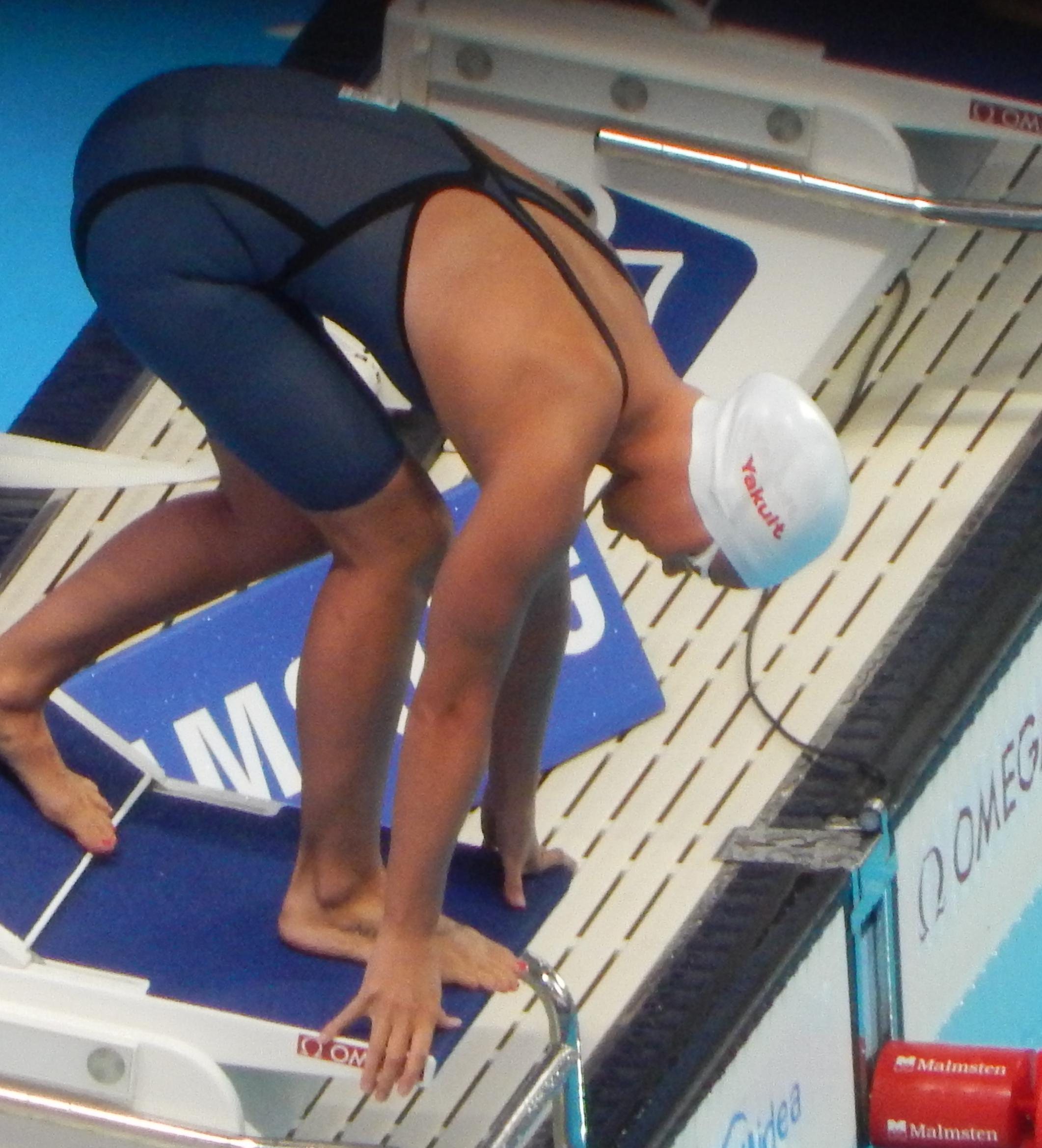
Pernille Blume, 2015

- Victoria Kjær Theilvig (born 2003), Miss Universe 2024

=== Sport ===
- Kim Staal (born 1978), a Danish former ice hockey forward, who last played with Herlev Eagles
- Thor Dresler (born 1979) a Danish former ice hockey player and current ice hockey coach
- Dennis Sørensen (born 1981), a retired Danish footballer with over 350 club caps
- Kenneth Hansen (born 1987), a motorcycle speedway rider
- Anders Randrup (born 1988), a Danish footballer with over 250 club caps
- Mike Jensen (born 1988), a Danish footballer with over 340 club caps and five for Denmark
- Pernille Blume (born 1994), a Danish swimmer, gold medalist in women's 50 m freestyle at the 2016 Summer Olympics

== Twin cities ==
- Finland, Lieto
- Iceland, Seltjarnarnes
- Norway, Nesodden
- Sweden, Höganäs
- Germany, Eberswalde
