= Herlev Eagles =

Ice hockey team in Herlev, Denmark

- City: Herlev, Denmark
- League: Metal Ligaen; 2011 – present 1999 – 2009; 1982 – 1992; 1st Division; 2009 – 2011; 1992 – 1999; 1974 – 1982
- Founded: 1968
- Home arena: PM Montage Arena (capacity: 1800)
- Colours: Black, gold, white
- General manager: Nicolai Flindt
- Head coach: Patric Wener
- Website: Herlev Eagles

Franchise history
- 1968 - 1992: Herlev IK
- 1992 - 1999: Herlev Ishockey
- 1999 - 2005: Herlev Eagles
- 2005 - 2011: Herlev Hornets
- 2011 - present: Herlev Eagles

Championships
- Playoff championships: 1 (1984)

The Herlev Eagles are a Danish ice hockey team based in Herlev, part of the Urban area of Copenhagen, that plays in the Metal Ligaen the top tier of the sport in Denmark. The team is based in Herlev and play their home games at the Herlev Skøjtehal, known as PM Montage Arena for sponsorship reasons.

== History ==
Herlev Ice Hockey club (Danish: Herlev Ishockey Klub), of which the Herlev Eagles are a part, was founded in 1968 by Poul Andersen, Jørgen Raae and Torben With after With returned to Denmark having lived in Canada where he developed a love of hockey and the Toronto Maple Leafs. Upon his return in 1964, With was initially involved with a team based in nearby Rødovre, until he decided to found a team in Herlev along with Andersen and his brother-in-law Raae. The team initially played in Rødovre, until 1977 when the Herlev Skøjtehal was built.

During the early 1980s Herlev IK played in the 2nd Division, and were often at the head of the table. During the 1981–82 season Herlev signed Canadian duo Frank Barth and Dana Barbin who helped lead the team to a first-place finish. The team would then make it to the play-off final against the recently relegated Esbjerg IK, with the winners gaining promotion to the 1st Division (now known as the Metal Ligaen). Herlev won, securing themselves a spot in the Danish top tier. During this time, Herlev also signed the Schultz brothers, Arne and Palle, from nearby Hvidovre who would go on to be integral parts of the team in the 1st Division. The 1982-83 was Herlev's first in the top division, and they performed well, finishing 2nd in the regular season. However, they lost in the play-off semi-finals to AaB Ishockey, they would still claim some silverware however, as they won the bronze-medal game against Rungsted IK. Barbin and Barth would finishing the season at the top of the league scoring charts. Herlev's second season in the top tier saw the team reach new heights, with Barbin and Barth again dominating the scoring charts. Herlev finished the regular season at the top of the table and would meet AaB Ishockey in the play-off final. Herlev would have revenge on the team that knocked them out of the play-offs the year prior, beating them and therefore winning their first Danish Championship in only their 2nd season in the top tier.

Herlev entered the 1984–85 as reigning champions, however, tragedy struck the team in December 1984 when Palle Schultz was accidentally struck in the neck with a stick in a game against Rungsted. Although he finished the game, the following day he lost consciousness as the strike from the stick had caused a blood clot that had stopped the blood supply to his brain. Five days on later on December 6, Schultz died at the age of 24. He was interred at Hvidovre Church. Despite their loss, the team finished a respectable 3rd in the regular season, and qualified for the play-offs. The play-off format was changed for this season, instead of a knock-out bracket as usual, the top four teams in the regular season qualified for a post-season round robin tournament. Herlev managed 4 points in 6 games as Rødovre IK won the championship.

A shake up in Danish hockey occurred during the 1985–86 season; the name of top division changed from the 1st Division to the Eliteserien, and the number of teams competing in the league was halved, from 14 the previous year down to 7. In this new-look league, Herlev had a fair season, finishing in 4th place and qualifying for the four team round-robin play-offs, where they finished bottom of the group, with Rødovre winning back-to-back championships. The team struggled the following season finishing 6th out of 7 teams and failing to qualify for the play-offs for the first time since they joined the top tier. The team rebounded somewhat and they solidified themselves as a mid-table team over the next few seasons. In this time, they twice reached the bronze medal game, however, in both instances (1989 & 1991) the team failed to gain any silver-ware. Herlev had a disastrous season in 1991-92, as they finished dead last in the regular season and suffered the ignominy of relegation to the 2nd tier of the sport, now called the 1st Division, ending a ten-year run in the top tier. To further add salt to the wound, at the end of the season, the Eliteserien expanded to 10 teams.

In their first season back in the 1st Division the team changed their name from Herlev IK to Herlev Ishockey. Whilst the team initially fared well in the lower division, the gap in skill level between themselves and the last placed team in the Eliteserien prevented Herlev from gaining promotion back to the top level via the end of season qualification game. One bright spot in Herlev's initial seasons in 1st Division however was the emergence of home-grown youngster Kim Staal. Staal would later move to Sweden and played in the Swedish Elitserien, primarily for Malmö Redhawks, as well as the Danish national team. Over the years, the team's performance in the 1st Division would slide, until they were in the bottom half of the table; this all changed however following the culmination of the 1998–99 season, when they, along with Gladsaxe SF were promoted to the top tier, now called the Codan Ligaen for sponsorship reasons. Upon rejoining the top tier, the club changed their name once again to the Herlev Eagles. The Eagles would struggle upon their return to the top flight, regularly finding themselves at, or near, the foot of the table, however, they managed the avoid relegation. During the 2002–03 season, Herlev again qualified for the play-offs, however, they did not progress past the opening round. Not only did the Eagles manage to qualify for the play-offs, but they also reached the final of the Danish Cup ultimately losing to a strong Odense Bulldogs side. They also strengthened their side, signing Jesper Duus and Patrick Boij from Hvidovre IK after the Hvidovre side filed for bankruptcy.

September 28, 2003 marked an important day in the history of the club, as it was the day on which the rebuilding of the Herlev Skøjtehal was completed. The Eagles were unable to mark the occasion with a win, suffering a 4–0 loss to Herning Blue Fox. The club's fortunes did not improve during the 2003-04 season however, finishing 8th out of 9 teams. However, the following season would see an upturn in the team's fortunes, as they achieved their highest placing in nearly 20 years by finishing 3rd. Despite the good run of form in the regular season, they had a disappointing play-offs, losing in the opening round to the Odense Bulldogs. Following the end of the season, the team again changed its name, this time to the Herlev Hornets. Moving forward, the team were regularly found at the foot the league table, finishing last for 3 years in a row, whilst selling off their most valuable players to ensure solvency. The 2007–08 AL-Bank Ligaen season was an abject once, which saw the Hornets led by coach Johan Marklund win only 4 games all season, failing to win a single game from November onwards. Despite the team languishing at the foot to the AL-Bank Ligaen the team nevertheless remained in the Danish top flight. The 2008–09 season again saw the team at the foot of the table, with Coach Marklund being relieved of his duties and replaced with Erik Vikström. Things only got worse for the team however, as the mounting financial issues caught up with the team, though they were able to make it to season end.

In spring 2009 as a result of the financial pressures accrued over the previous seasons a new club was founded, however, the new side still retains the history and lineage of Herlev Ishockey Klub. The initial plan was for this team to play in the AL-Bank Ligaen, however, due to financial issues the team were required to return to Division 1. After spending a couple of seasons in the second tier, professional hockey returned to Herlev in 2011 when the team, who had reverted to the Herlev Eagles moniker, returned to the AL-Bank Ligaen. The team's first season back in the top flight saw the team signing some marquee names, including that of Kim Staal, who returned to his home-town club having played extensively across Sweden, as well as Finn Tomas Sinisalo and talented youngster Frederik Storm from nearby Gentofte, joining Thor Dresler, the leading scorer in franchise history. Herlev fared well in their first season back in the top division, finishing 6th out of 10 teams in the regular season, however, they lost to SønderjyskE in the opening round of the play-offs. The 2010s have seen Herlev remain in the bottom half of the top tier, known as the Metal Ligaen from 2014 onwards, including the disastrous 2016–17 season where the team managed to win only one game in regulation time. Despite this however, they have avoided relegation and have remained in the Metal Ligaen. The Eagles were in 7th position out of 10 teams during the 2019–20 season when the play-offs were cancelled as a result of the COVID-19 pandemic. This marked their best result since 2012. They would finish in 7th position again the following season, and would be swept in the open round of the play-offs by the Aalborg Pirates.

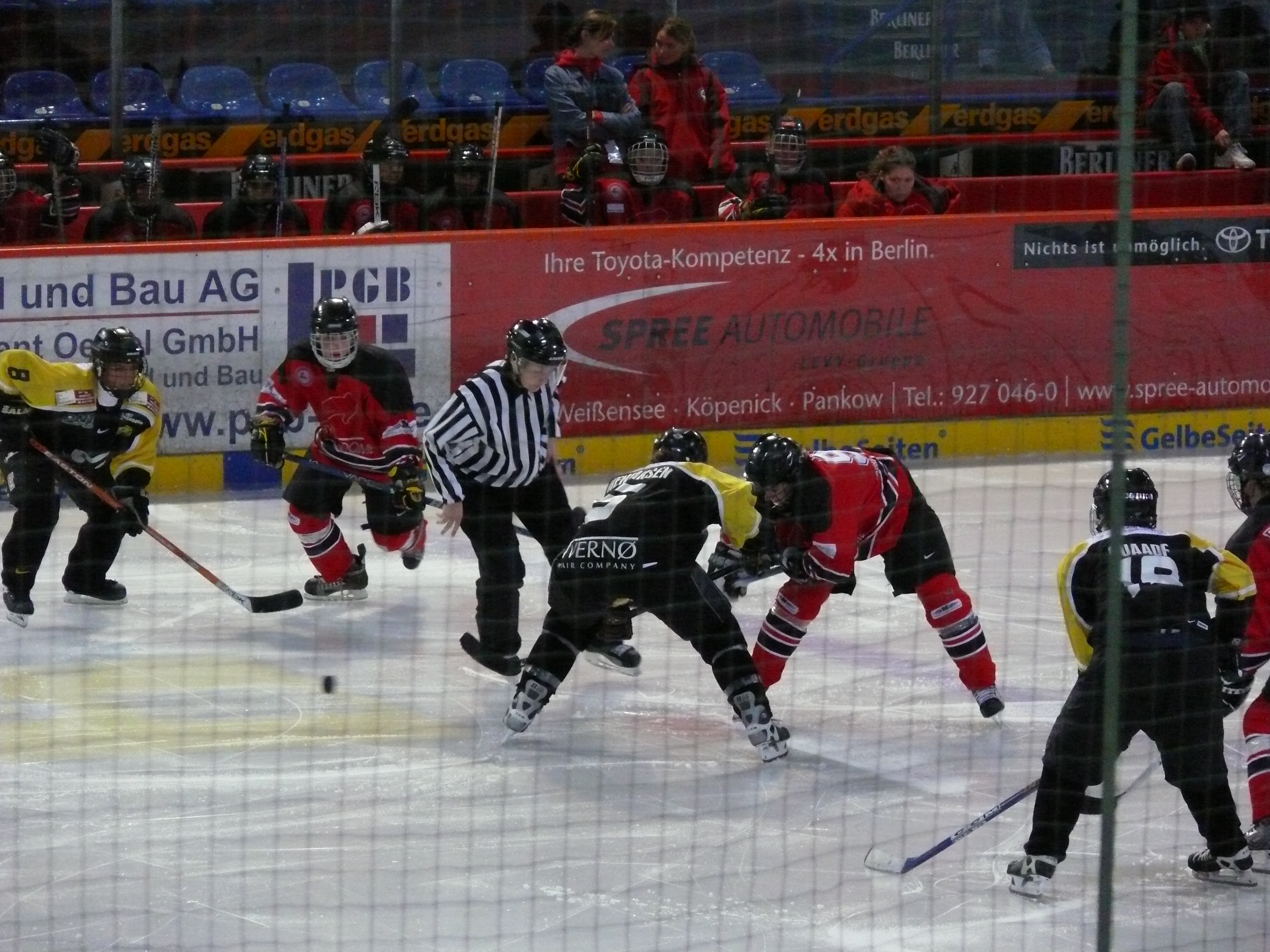
Herlev women's team, in black, facing off against OSC Berlin during the 2006 IIHF European Women's Champions Cup.

=== Club structure ===
The Herlev Eagles is the professional side attached to Herlev Ishockey Klub. The club operates a range of teams, including a reserve team in the 1st Division, and multiple youth teams across a variety of ages. Herlev Ishockey Klub's Women's team is one of Denmark's successful, having repeatedly appeared in the IIHF European Women's Champions Cup as Danish champions. The competition was last played in 2015, with the Herlev side making it through the 2nd round.

The team's supporters club is known as Ørneborgen, or 'Eagles Nest', and focuses on raising funds for the team.

=== Current roster ===
Updated 3 October 2024.

No.	Nat	Player	Pos	S/G	Age	Acquired	Birthplace
23	(Denmark)	Simon Aasmul	LW	R	23	2021	Hvidovre, Denmark
19	(Denmark)	Matthias Asperup	LW	L	30	2024	Søborg, Denmark
20	(Sweden)	Lucas Carlsson	C	R	31	2024	Stockholm, Sweden
76	(Canada)	Tim Daly	D	R	33	2024	Maple Ridge, British Columbia, Canada
12	(Denmark)	Mathias Hansen	C	L	24	2023	Hvidovre, Denmark
11	(Sweden)	Nicklas Heinerö	RW	R	33	2023	Västerhaninge, Sweden
31	(Denmark)	Jonatan Hintze	G	L	22	2022	Herlev, Denmark
6	(Sweden)	Anton Johansson (C)	D	L	31	2020	Värnamo, Sweden
29	(Denmark)	Oskar Just Petersen	D	L	21	2023	Gentofte, Denmark
74	(Denmark)	Jeppe Kramer	D	R	19	2024	Hvidovre, Denmark
93	(Denmark)	Marius Kring Andersen	D	L	20	2023	Rødovre, Denmark
26	(Denmark)	Peter Lauritzen	C	L	24	2021	Herlev, Denmark
23	(Sweden)	Axel Linström	LW	L	29	2024	Malmö, Sweden
62	(Denmark)	Magnus Povlsen	D	L	31	2023	Rødovre, Denmark
35	(Denmark)	Philip Rafnsson	LW	L	22	2023	Ystad, Sweden
10	(Denmark)	Noah Samsøe	D	L	26	2023	Rungsted, Denmark
24	(Denmark)	Rasmus Simonsen	C	R	25	2024	Vojens, Denmark
21	(Sweden)	Isac Skedung	C	L	28	2024	Västerås, Sweden
7	(Denmark)	Mikkel Skjellerup	F	L	23	2022	Hvidovre, Denmark
15	(Canada)	Maxime Trépanier	LW	L	26	2024	Saint-Jean-sur-Richelieu, Quebec, Canada
44	(Denmark)	Oliver True	RW	R	25	2023	Rungsted, Denmark
65	(Denmark)	Jerry Välipirtti	D	L	24	2023	Herlev, Denmark
1	(Sweden)	Emil Zetterquist	G	L	27	2024	Stockholm, Sweden
18	(Denmark)	Daniel Ølgaard Petersen	C	R	23	2022	Hvidovre, Denmark

== Season-by-season record ==
Note: GP = Games played, W = Wins, L = Losses, T = Ties, OTL = Overtime losses, Pts = Points, GF = Goals for, GA = Goals against, PIM = Penalties in minutes

Season	League	GP	W	L	T	OTW	OTL	Pts	GF	GA	Finish	Playoffs
2016-17	Metal Ligaen	45	1	36	—	5	3	16	102	228	10th	Did not qualify
2017-18	Metal Ligaen	50	10	34	—	4	2	36	107	186	10th	Quarter-final loss (Note: The Eagles were docked four points due to financial issues at the beginning of the season.)
2018-19	Metal Ligaen	40	12	22	—	5	1	47	121	133	8th	Quarter-final loss
2019-20	Metal Ligaen	48	23	25	—	5	4	68	158	171	7th	Playoffs cancelled
2020-21	Metal Ligaen	48	18	30	—	4	4	52	108	163	7th	Quarter-final loss

== Honours ==
Danish Championships:

- 1984

== Team records ==
=== Career ===
These are the top five scorers in Herlev history.

Note: Pos = Position; GP = Games played; G = Goals; A = Assists; Pts = Points

Player	Pos	GP	G	A	Pts
Thor Dresler	F	257	166	198	364
Johan Marklund	F	269	185	147	332
Jan Larsen	F	178	113	126	239
Frank Barth	F	91	115	121	236
Rasmus Olsen	F	241	127	93	220

Penalty minutes: Brian Jensen, 445

=== Season ===
==== Regular season ====
- Most goals in a season: Johan Marklund, 61 (1997–98)
- Most assists in a season: Dana Barbin, 65 (1983–84)
- Most points in a season: Johan Marklund, 109 (1997–98)
- Most penalty minutes in a season: Antti-Pekka Lamberg, 149 (2006–07)

==== Playoffs ====
- Most goals in a playoff season: Patrik Boij, 6 (2002–03)
- Most assists in a playoff season: Brett Thompson, 8 (2017–18)
- Most points in a playoff season: Brett Thompson, 13 (2017–18)
- Most penalty minutes in a playoff season: Mike Daugulis, 39 (2017–18)

== Notable players ==
- Robert Burakovsky
- Jordan Knackstedt
- Kai Nurminen
- Kim Staal
