= 2002–03 SuperBest Ligaen season =

Danish ice hockey league season

The 2002–03 SuperBest Ligaen season was the 46th season of ice hockey in Denmark. Eight teams participated in the league, and the Herning Blue Fox won the championship.

== First round ==
	Club	GP	W	OTW	OTL	L	GF	GA	Pts
1.	Odense Bulldogs	28	19	2	0	7	90	48	61
2.	Rungsted IK	28	14	4	2	8	100	87	52
3.	Herning Blue Fox	28	12	4	2	10	92	80	46
4.	Esbjerg IK	28	11	2	3	12	83	89	40
5.	Rødovre Mighty Bulls	28	11	1	5	11	79	80	40
6.	AaB Ishockey	28	8	5	2	13	73	97	36
7.	Herlev Eagles	28	10	0	4	14	65	82	34
8.	Frederikshavn White Hawks	28	6	3	4	15	87	106	28

== Second round ==
=== Group A ===
	Club	GP	W	T	L	GF	GA	Pts (Bonus)
1.	Rungsted IK	6	4	0	2	24	15	14(2)
2.	Esbjerg IK	6	4	0	2	18	17	13(1)
3.	Rødovre Mighty Bulls	6	3	0	3	16	16	9(0)
4.	Frederikshavn White Hawks	6	1	0	5	13	23	4(0)

=== Group B ===
	Club	GP	W	T	L	GF	GA	Pts (Bonus)
1.	Herning Blue Fox	6	4	0	2	21	11	13(1)
2.	Odense Bulldogs	6	3	0	3	12	13	12(3)
3.	Herlev Eagles	6	4	0	2	19	15	12(0)
4.	AaB Ishockey	6	1	0	5	11	24	3(0)

== Playoffs ==
Semi-finals
Rungsted IK	1
Odense Bulldogs	3
Herning Blue Fox	3
Esbjerg IK	1

Final
Odense Bulldogs	1
Herning Blue Fox	3
Third place
Rungsted IK	3
Esbjerg IK	1
