= 2004–05 Oddset Ligaen season =

Danish ice hockey league season

The 2004–05 Oddset Ligaen season was the 48th season of ice hockey in Denmark. Nine teams participated in the league, and the Herning Blue Fox won the championship.

== Regular season ==
	Club	GP	W	OTW	OTL	L	GF	GA	Pts
1.	Herning Blue Fox	36	22	4	4	6	148	86	78
2.	AaB Ishockey	36	17	5	6	8	116	77	67
3.	Herlev Hornets	36	15	4	4	13	107	98	57
4.	Nordsjælland Cobras	36	10	9	5	12	119	122	53
5.	Rødovre Mighty Bulls	36	14	4	2	16	118	145	52
6.	Frederikshavn White Hawks	36	14	2	2	18	114	110	48
7.	Odense Bulldogs	36	12	3	3	18	103	113	45
8.	SønderjyskE Ishockey	36	13	0	5	18	100	131	44
9.	Esbjerg IK	36	10	5	2	19	98	141	42

== Playoffs ==
Quarter-finals
Herning Blue Fox	4
Rødovre Mighty Bulls	1
Nordsjælland Cobras	3
Frederikshavn White Hawks	4
AaB Ishockey	4
SønderjyskE Ishockey	0
Herlev Hornets	3
Odense Bulldogs	4

Semi-finals
Herning Blue Fox	4
Frederikshavn White Hawks	1
AaB Ishockey	4
Odense Bulldogs	2

Final
Herning Blue Fox	4
AaB Ishockey	2
Third place
Frederikshavn White Hawks	2
Odense Bulldogs	0
