= 2003–04 SuperBest Ligaen season =

Danish ice hockey league season

The 2003–04 SuperBest Ligaen season was the 47th season of ice hockey in Denmark. Nine teams participated in the league, and Esbjerg IK won the championship.

== Regular season ==
	Club	GP	W	OTW	OTL	L	GF	GA	Pts
1.	Herning IK	36	23	1	6	6	152	83	77
2.	Esbjerg IK	36	20	5	1	10	148	108	71
3.	AaB Ishockey	36	15	6	3	12	131	107	60
4.	Odense Bulldogs	36	15	3	4	14	108	105	55
5.	Rungsted IK	36	16	1	3	16	117	128	53
6.	Frederikshavn White Hawks	36	14	4	2	16	125	121	52
7.	IK Sønderjylland	36	11	3	5	17	93	123	44
8.	Herlev Hornets	36	10	4	3	19	91	114	41
9.	Rødovre Mighty Bulls	36	10	1	1	24	96	172	33

== Playoffs ==
Quarter-finals
Esbjerg IK	4
Rungsted IK	3
Odense Bulldogs	4
Frederikshavn White Hawks	0
Herning IK	4
IK Sønderjylland	1
AaB Ishockey	4
Herlev Hornets	3

Semi-finals
Esbjerg IK	4
Odense Bulldogs	3
Herning IK	2
AaB Ishockey	4

Final
Esbjerg IK	4
AaB Ishockey	3
Third place
Herning IK	0
Odense Bulldogs	2
