= Kim Lykkeskov =

Danish ice hockey player

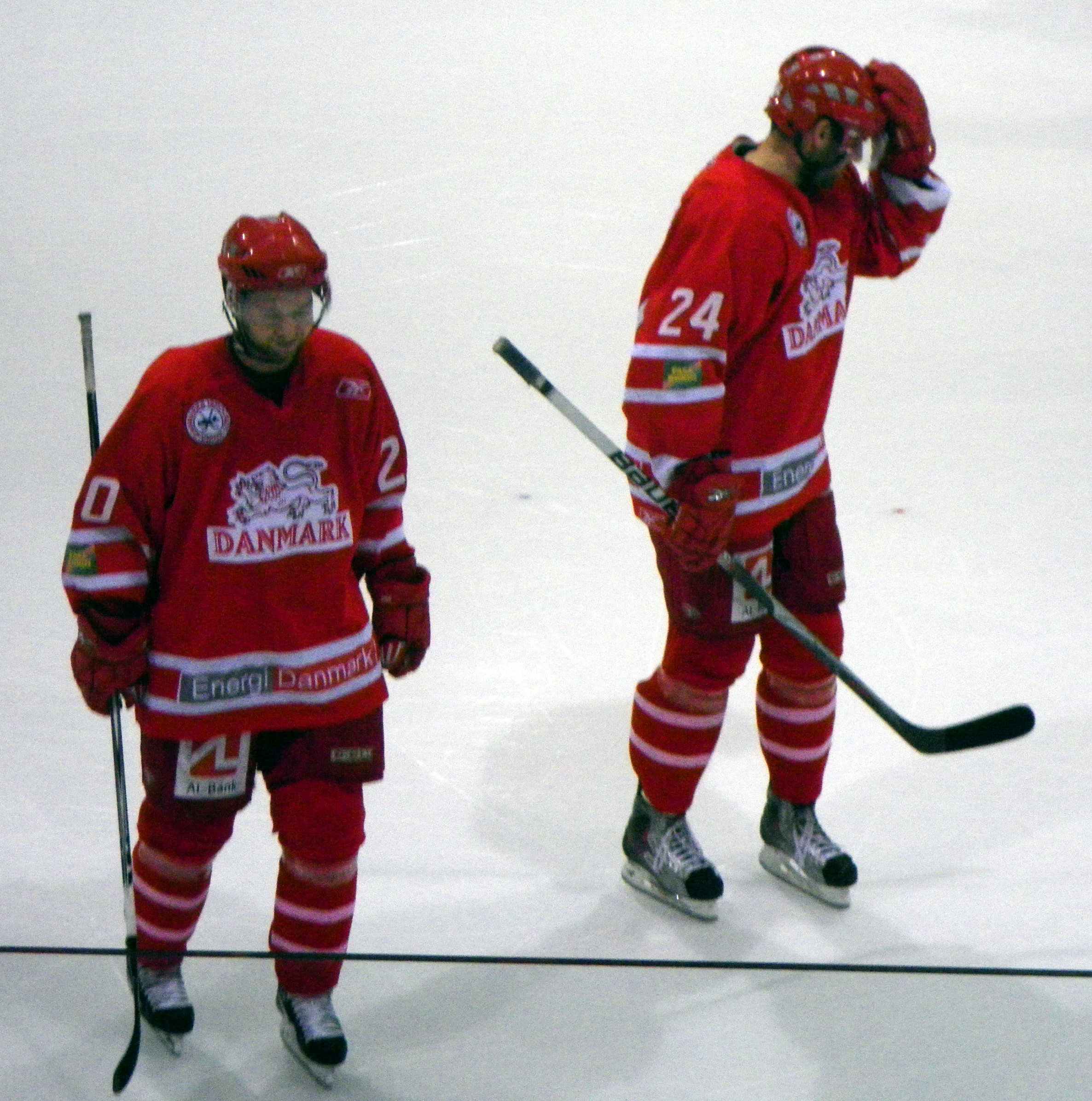
- Born: July 20, 1983 (age 41); Vojens, Denmark
- Height: 5 ft 9 in (175 cm)
- Weight: 168 lb (76 kg; 12 st 0 lb)
- Position: Forward
- Shot: Left
- Played for: SønderjyskE Ishockey
- National team: Denmark
- Playing career: 2001–2017

Kim Lykkeskov (born 20 July 1983, in Vojens) is a Danish professional ice hockey player who participated at the 2010 IIHF World Championship as a member of the Denmark National men's ice hockey team.

== Career statistics ==
			Regular season					Playoffs
Season	Team	League	GP	G	A	Pts	PIM	GP	G	A	Pts	PIM
2001–02	Vojens Lions	Denmark	39	1	4	5	4	—	—	—	—	—
2002–03	Vojens Lions	Denmark	30	3	12	15	10	—	—	—	—	—
2003–04	IK Sønderjylland	Denmark	35	6	12	18	52	5	0	3	3	2
2004–05	SønderjyskE	Denmark	32	8	9	17	44	4	0	0	0	2
2005–06	SønderjyskE	Denmark	34	5	5	10	32	18	6	7	13	43
2006–07	Vojens Lions	Denmark2	1	0	0	0	0	—	—	—	—	—
2006–07	SønderjyskE	Denmark	31	6	13	19	66	13	1	4	5	28
2007–08	SønderjyskE	Denmark	45	15	29	44	18	11	4	4	8	20
2008–09	SønderjyskE	Denmark	43	6	23	29	30	16	6	10	16	4
2009–10	SønderjyskE	Denmark	35	16	24	40	22	11	7	12	19	0
2010–11	SønderjyskE	Denmark	31	18	22	40	20	12	2	4	6	6
2011–12	SønderjyskE	Denmark	38	15	29	44	28	11	1	8	9	8
2012–13	SønderjyskE	Denmark	36	19	32	51	12	16	2	11	13	6
2013–14	SønderjyskE	Denmark	17	7	9	16	20	16	4	6	10	8
2014–15	SønderjyskE	Denmark	36	11	29	40	14	15	7	14	21	26
2015–16	SønderjyskE	Denmark	45	12	25	37	36	13	2	6	8	2
2016–17	SønderjyskE	Denmark	45	10	19	29	20	6	0	1	1	0
Denmark totals			572	158	296	454	428	167	42	90	132	155
