= Rasmus Nielsen (ice hockey) =

Danish ice hockey player (born 1990)

- Born: September 8, 1990 (age 34); Herning, Denmark
- Height: 5 ft 9 in (175 cm)
- Weight: 192 lb (87 kg; 13 st 10 lb)
- Position: Defense
- Shoots: Left
- AL-Bank Ligaen team: Herning Blue Fox
- National team: Denmark
- Playing career: 2007–present

Rasmus Nielsen (born September 8, 1990) is a Danish ice hockey player who is currently playing for the Herning Blue Fox of the AL-Bank Ligaen.

Nielsen competed in the 2013 IIHF World Championship as a member of the Denmark men's national ice hockey team.

== Career statistics ==
			Regular season					Playoffs
Season	Team	League	GP	G	A	Pts	PIM	GP	G	A	Pts	PIM
2007–08	Herning Blue Fox	Denmark	17	0	1	1	14	7	0	0	0	0
2008–09	Herning Blue Fox	Denmark	37	0	3	3	18	15	1	2	3	2
2009–10	Herning Blue Fox	Denmark	26	0	3	3	34	12	0	1	1	12
2010–11	Herning Blue Fox	Denmark	39	3	12	15	69	14	3	2	5	33
2011–12	Herning Blue Fox	Denmark	40	3	15	18	20	17	1	3	4	8
2012–13	Herning Blue Fox	Denmark	40	3	6	9	10	6	0	0	0	0
2013–14	Herning Blue Fox	Denmark	40	4	12	16	24	15	1	7	8	12
2014–15	Herning Blue Fox	Denmark	35	3	12	15	14	13	1	3	4	10
2015–16	Herning Blue Fox	Denmark	44	2	7	9	30	20	0	3	3	14
Denmark totals			318	18	71	89	233	119	7	21	28	91
