= Steffen Klarskov =

Danish ice hockey player

- Born: 12 March 1991 (age 34); Rødovre, Denmark
- Height: 5 ft 10 in (178 cm)
- Weight: 183 lb (83 kg; 13 st 1 lb)
- Position: Forward
- Shot: Left
- Played for: Rødovre Mighty Bulls; Frederikshavn White Hawks; Aalborg Pirates; Herning Blue Fox
- National team: Denmark
- Playing career: 2007–2021

Steffen Klarskov Nielsen (born 12 March 1991) is a Danish ice hockey player for Rødovre Mighty Bulls and the Danish national team.

He participated at the 2017 IIHF World Championship.

== Career statistics ==
			Regular season					Playoffs
Season	Team	League	GP	G	A	Pts	PIM	GP	G	A	Pts	PIM
2006–07	Rødovre U20	Denmark U20	4	5	2	7	2	—	—	—	—	—
2007–08	Rødovre U20	Denmark U20	23	7	7	14	22	2	0	1	1	2
2007–08	Rødovre SIK	Denmark2	17	6	5	11	22	1	0	0	0	0
2008–09	Rødovre U20	Denmark U20	31	18	24	42	50	2	0	0	0	0
2008–09	Rødovre SIK	Denmark2	20	2	10	12	18	3	0	0	0	2
2009–10	Rødovre U20	Denmark U20	4	3	4	7	6	4	3	2	5	6
2009–10	Rødovre II	Denmark2	5	4	1	5	4	—	—	—	—	—
2009–10	Rødovre Mighty Bulls	Denmark	33	1	3	4	41	7	2	1	3	6
2010–11	Rødovre Mighty Bulls	Denmark	38	6	7	13	54	11	3	2	5	31
2011–12	Frederikshavn U20	Denmark U20	2	1	0	1	0	3	4	1	5	6
2011–12	Frederikshavn White Hawks	Denmark	40	9	5	14	20	4	1	1	2	4
2012–13	Aalborg II	Denmark2	3	0	2	2	2	—	—	—	—	—
2012–13	Aalborg Pirates	Denmark	39	7	6	13	68	3	0	0	0	0
2013–14	Aalborg Pirates	Denmark	40	8	9	17	28	13	5	1	6	44
2014–15	Rødovre Mighty Bulls	Denmark	36	11	11	22	64	5	2	1	3	0
2015–16	Frederikshavn White Hawks	Denmark	45	9	16	25	34	13	2	5	7	12
2016–17	Rødovre Mighty Bulls	Denmark	38	15	10	25	22	—	—	—	—	—
2016–17	Herning Blue Fox	Denmark	6	1	2	3	2	6	3	3	6	10
2017–18	Rødovre Mighty Bulls	Denmark	27	11	10	21	28	7	3	2	5	6
2018–19	Rødovre Mighty Bulls	Denmark	30	12	14	26	32	6	1	2	3	4
2019–20	Rødovre Mighty Bulls	Denmark	48	17	24	41	59	—	—	—	—	—
2020–21	Rødovre Mighty Bulls	Denmark	41	12	19	31	28	—	—	—	—	—
Denmark totals			461	119	136	255	480	75	22	18	40	117
