= Bjarke Møller =

Danish professional ice hockey player (born 1985)

- Born: September 23, 1985 (age 39); Aalborg, Denmark
- Height: 6 ft 0 in (183 cm)
- Weight: 187 lb (85 kg; 13 st 5 lb)
- Position: Defence
- Shoots: Left
- AL-Bank Ligaen team: AaB Ishockey
- National team: Denmark
- Playing career: 2001–present

Bjarke Møller (born September 23, 1985) is a Danish professional ice hockey player who is currently playing for the AaB Ishockey of the AL-Bank Ligaen. Møller competed in several Junior World Cup events including 2003, 2005, 2005, and also the 2012 IIHF World Championship as a member of the Denmark men's national ice hockey team.

== Career statistics ==
			Regular season					Playoffs
Season	Team	League	GP	G	A	Pts	PIM	GP	G	A	Pts	PIM
2001–02	Aalborg IK Panthers	Ligaen	9	0	1	1	10	–	–	–	–	–
2002–03	Aalborg IK Panthers	Ligaen	20	0	1	1	2	–	–	–	–	–
2003–04	Aalborg AaB Ishockey	Ligaen	35	5	2	7	4	–	–	–	–	–
2004–05	Aalborg AaB Ishockey	Ligaen	16	1	0	1	2	–	–	–	–	–
2005–06	Aalborg AaB Ishockey	Ligaen	35	5	3	8	28	–	–	–	–	–
2006–07	Aalborg AaB Ishockey	Ligaen	35	0	1	1	12	16	0	0	0	14
2007–08	Aalborg AaB Ishockey	Ligaen	42	0	7	7	16	5	0	0	0	0
2008–09	Aalborg AaB Ishockey	Ligaen	42	4	12	16	8	5	0	0	0	2
2009–10	Aalborg AaB Ishockey	Ligaen	23	2	7	9	8	14	3	4	7	0
2010–11	Aalborg AaB Ishockey	Ligaen	37	1	27	28	8	4	1	2	3	2
2011–12	Aalborg AaB Ishockey	Ligaen	16	4	3	7	10	8	5	3	8	2
2012–13	Aalborg Pirates	Ligaen	25	4	17	21	6	7	2	1	3	2
2013–14	Aalborg Pirates	Ligaen	23	6	7	13	6	13	2	4	6	2
2014–15	Aalborg Pirates	Ligaen	31	10	14	24	8	5	0	1	1	2
2015–16	Aalborg IK	Ligaen-2	3	0	1	1	0	–	–	–	–	–
Metal Ligaen totals			409	41	102	143	128	83	13	15	28	26
