= Thomas Spelling =

Danish ice hockey player (born 1993)

- Born: 9 February 1993 (age 33) Herning, Denmark
- Height: 6 ft 1 in (185 cm)
- Weight: 176 lb (80 kg; 12 st 8 lb)
- Position: Winger
- Shoots: Right
- ML team Former teams: Aalborg Pirates; SønderjyskE Ishockey; Herning Blue Fox; Rögle BK
- National team: Denmark
- NHL draft: 142nd overall, 2012; New York Rangers
- Playing career: 2009–present

Thomas Spelling (born 9 February 1993) is a Danish ice hockey player. He is currently playing with Aalborg Pirates of the Metal Ligaen. Spelling was selected by the New York Rangers in the 5th round (142nd overall) of the 2012 NHL entry draft.

Spelling made his Elitserien (now the SHL) debut playing with Rögle BK during the 2012–13 Elitserien season.

== Career statistics ==
=== Regular season and playoffs ===
			Regular Season					Playoffs
Season	Team	League	GP	G	A	Pts	PIM	GP	G	A	Pts	PIM
2009–10	Herning Blue Fox	AL-Bank Ligaen	32	5	9	14	6	10	2	0	2	6
2010–11	Herning Blue Fox	AL-Bank Ligaen	39	18	11	29	14	11	3	4	7	2
2011–12	Herning Blue Fox	AL-Bank Ligaen	33	21	16	37	6	2	0	1	1	0
2012–13	Rögle J20	SuperElit	36	19	30	49	6	2	0	1	1	0
2012–13	Rögle BK	SHL	7	0	0	0	0	-	-	-	-	-
2012–13	IK Oskarshamn	Allsvenskan	4	0	0	0	0	-	-	-	-	-
2013–14	SønderjyskE	Metal Ligaen	40	24	27	51	20	16	11	4	15	4
2014–15	SønderjyskE	Metal Ligaen	36	19	22	41	20	15	13	17	30	8
2015-16	SønderjyskE	Metal Ligaen	45	24	27	51	12	13	9	3	12	2
2016-17	SønderjyskE	Metal Ligaen	45	15	26	41	12	6	0	3	3	2
2017-18	SønderjyskE	Metal Ligaen	36	12	20	32	8	8	3	3	6	5
2018-19	Aalborg Pirates	Metal Ligaen	40	17	38	55	16

== Awards and honors ==
- Danish Champion: 2014-15, 2013–14, 2011–12, 2010–11
- Danish Cup winner: 2011-12
