= Mathias Bau Hansen =

Danish ice hockey player (born 1993)

- Bau Hansen with the Herning Blue Fox in 2026
- Born: 3 July 1993 (age 33) Glostrup, Denmark
- Height: 6 ft 7 in (201 cm)
- Weight: 238 lb (108 kg; 17 st 0 lb)
- Position: Forward
- Shoots: Left
- Metal team Former teams: Herning Blue Fox; Rødovre Mighty Bulls; IK Pantern; Frederikshavn White Hawks; Hershey Bears; Dornbirn Bulldogs
- National team: Denmark
- NHL draft: Undrafted
- Playing career: 2010–present

Mathias Bau Hansen (born 3 July 1993) is a Danish professional ice hockey player who is a forward for Herning Blue Fox of the Metal Ligaen.

== Playing career ==
Bau Hansen made his Superisligaen debut playing with the Rødovre Mighty Bulls during the 2011–12 AL-Bank Ligaen season.

After three successful seasons with the Frederikshavn White Hawks, Bau Hansen captured the attention of North America, agreeing to a one-year AHL contract with the Hershey Bears, affiliate to the Washington Capitals on 20 June 2017. In his debut North American season with the Bears in 2017–18, Bau recorded 13 goals and 23 points in 58 games and notched five game-winning goals, tied for the most on the team.

On 9 May 2018, he was rewarded for a solid season by signing a one-year, two-way contract with the Washington Capitals.

After suffering a serious injury while participating with Denmark during the 2018 World Championships, Bau Hansen was initially ruled out of the beginning of the 2018–19 season, placed on the Capitals injured non-roster list. While taking a long recovery from broken ribs and a tear in his spleen, Bau Hansen was ruled out from the remainder of the season during February 2019 and returned to his native Denmark to continue his return to fitness.

With his contract concluded with the Capitals, Bau Hansen was not tendered a qualifying offer and was released as a free agent. On 16 July 2019, Bau Hansen returned to Europe in agreeing to a one-year contract with Austrian club, Dornbirn Bulldogs of the EBEL.

== Career statistics ==
=== Regular season and playoffs ===
| | | | Regular season | | | | | Playoffs |
| Season | Team | League | GP | G | A | Pts | PIM | GP | G | A | Pts | PIM |
|---|---|---|---|---|---|---|---|---|---|---|---|---|
| 2007–08 | Rødovre Mighty Bulls | DEN U17 | 12 | 13 | 12 | 25 | 4 | — | — | — | — | — |
| 2008–09 | Rødovre Mighty Bulls | DEN U17 | 11 | 16 | 4 | 20 | 35 | — | — | — | — | — |
| 2008–09 | Rødovre Mighty Bulls | DEN U20 | 12 | 3 | 1 | 4 | 2 | 2 | 1 | 0 | 1 | 0 |
| 2008–09 | Rødovre IK | DEN.2 | 9 | 2 | 1 | 3 | 0 | 1 | 0 | 0 | 0 | 2 |
| 2009–10 | Rødovre Mighty Bulls | DEN U17 | 11 | 9 | 5 | 14 | 18 | — | — | — | — | — |
| 2009–10 | Rødovre Mighty Bulls | DEN U20 | 19 | 10 | 12 | 22 | 16 | 5 | 2 | 0 | 2 | 2 |
| 2009–10 | Rødovre IK | DEN.2 | 18 | 4 | 5 | 9 | 6 | — | — | — | — | — |
| 2010–11 | Rødovre Mighty Bulls | DEN U20 | 16 | 10 | 18 | 28 | 20 | 5 | 3 | 4 | 7 | 10 |
| 2010–11 | Rødovre IK | DEN.2 | 30 | 17 | 12 | 29 | 136 | 15 | 11 | 8 | 19 | 34 |
| 2010–11 | Rødovre Mighty Bulls | DEN | 14 | 0 | 0 | 0 | 2 | 3 | 0 | 0 | 0 | 0 |
| 2011–12 | Rødovre Mighty Bulls | DEN | 36 | 4 | 11 | 15 | 22 | 7 | 3 | 1 | 4 | 4 |
| 2011–12 | Rødovre IK | DEN.2 | 1 | 1 | 2 | 3 | 0 | 3 | 3 | 1 | 4 | 4 |
| 2011–12 | Rødovre Mighty Bulls | DEN U20 | — | — | — | — | — | 3 | 4 | 4 | 8 | 4 |
| 2012–13 | Rødovre Mighty Bulls | DEN | 23 | 5 | 7 | 12 | 45 | — | — | — | — | — |
| 2012–13 | Malmö Redhawks | J20 | 13 | 6 | 4 | 10 | 18 | 3 | 4 | 0 | 4 | 4 |
| 2013–14 | Malmö Redhawks | J20 | 11 | 3 | 3 | 6 | 34 | — | — | — | — | — |
| 2013–14 | IK Pantern | SWE.3 | 32 | 7 | 10 | 17 | 62 | 10 | 4 | 10 | 14 | 16 |
| 2014–15 | Frederikshavn White Hawks | DEN | 29 | 15 | 8 | 23 | 20 | 10 | 6 | 3 | 9 | 16 |
| 2015–16 | Frederikshavn White Hawks | DEN | 32 | 19 | 25 | 44 | 64 | 13 | 7 | 15 | 22 | 12 |
| 2016–17 | Frederikshavn White Hawks | DEN | 41 | 16 | 24 | 40 | 81 | 15 | 4 | 9 | 13 | 8 |
| 2017–18 | Hershey Bears | AHL | 58 | 13 | 10 | 23 | 14 | — | — | — | — | — |
| 2019–20 | Dornbirn Bulldogs | EBEL | 46 | 5 | 18 | 23 | 61 | — | — | — | — | — |
| 2020–21 | Herning Blue Fox | DEN | 38 | 14 | 35 | 49 | 76 | — | — | — | — | — |
| 2021–22 | Herning Blue Fox | DEN | 36 | 23 | 20 | 43 | 24 | 5 | 3 | 3 | 6 | 2 |
| 2022–23 | Herning Blue Fox | DEN | 20 | 14 | 12 | 26 | 6 | 18 | 8 | 6 | 14 | 8 |
| 2023–24 | Herning Blue Fox | DEN | 46 | 16 | 32 | 48 | 39 | — | — | — | — | — |
| DEN totals | | | 315 | 126 | 174 | 300 | 379 | 71 | 31 | 37 | 68 | 50 |

=== International ===
| Year | Team | Event | Result | GP | G | A | Pts | PIM |
|---|---|---|---|---|---|---|---|---|
| 2011 | Denmark | U18 D1 | 11th | 5 | 0 | 2 | 2 | 14 |
| 2012 | Denmark | WJC | 10th | 5 | 2 | 2 | 4 | 0 |
| 2013 | Denmark | WJC D1A | 15th | 5 | 1 | 1 | 2 | 4 |
| 2015 | Denmark | WC | 14th | 5 | 0 | 0 | 0 | 4 |
| 2016 | Denmark | WC | 8th | 8 | 0 | 0 | 0 | 0 |
| 2016 | Denmark | OGQ | DNQ | 3 | 0 | 1 | 1 | 0 |
| 2017 | Denmark | WC | 12th | 7 | 0 | 1 | 1 | 0 |
| 2018 | Denmark | WC | 10th | 2 | 0 | 0 | 0 | 0 |
| 2019 | Denmark | WC | 11th | 7 | 2 | 1 | 3 | 4 |
| 2021 | Denmark | WC | 12th | 4 | 0 | 0 | 0 | 0 |
| 2022 | Denmark | OG | 7th | 5 | 0 | 1 | 1 | 0 |
| 2022 | Denmark | WC | 9th | 7 | 2 | 4 | 6 | 4 |
| 2023 | Denmark | WC | 10th | 7 | 1 | 1 | 2 | 6 |
| 2025 | Denmark | WC | 4th | 10 | 1 | 1 | 2 | 0 |
| Junior totals | | | | 15 | 3 | 5 | 8 | 18 |
| Senior totals | | | | 65 | 6 | 10 | 16 | 18 |
