= Nicolai Meyer =

Danish ice hockey player (born 1993)

- Born: 21 July 1993 (age 32) Frederikshavn, Denmark
- Height: 5 ft 10 in (178 cm)
- Weight: 181 lb (82 kg; 12 st 13 lb)
- Position: Forward
- Shoots: Left
- ICEHL team Former teams: HK Olimpija; Malmö Redhawks; Ässät; Vienna Capitals; HC Plzeň; EC Red Bull Salzburg
- National team: Denmark
- Playing career: 2010–present

Nicolai Meyer (born 21 July 1993) is a Danish professional ice hockey forward for the HK Olimpija of the ICE Hockey League (ICEHL).

== Playing career ==
In his third season in his return to Sweden in the HockeyAllsvenskan in 2018–19, Meyer broke out offensively with Södertälje SK, producing 29 goals and 62 points in 52 games, to lead the team and the Allsvenskan in each offensive category.

On April 17, 2019, he was rewarded with the two-year SHL contract in returning to former club, Malmö Redhawks.

== Career statistics ==
=== Regular season and playoffs ===
			Regular season					Playoffs
Season	Team	League	GP	G	A	Pts	PIM	GP	G	A	Pts	PIM
2007–08	Frederikshavn White Hawks	DEN U17	17	21	15	36	20	—	—	—	—	—
2008–09	Frederikshavn White Hawks	DEN U17	8	21	7	28	4	—	—	—	—	—
2008–09	Frederikshavn White Hawks	DEN U20	8	2	1	3	0	—	—	—	—	—
2009–10	Frederikshavn White Hawks	DEN U20	4	3	1	4	2	3	2	0	2	0
2009–10	Frederikshavn White Hawks	DEN	35	10	19	29	12	11	1	1	2	8
2009–10	Frederikshavn White Hawks II	DEN.2	3	4	1	5	4	—	—	—	—	—
2010–11	Malmö Redhawks	J18	1	3	0	3	2	—	—	—	—	—
2010–11	Malmö Redhawks	J18 Allsv	3	3	2	5	12	—	—	—	—	—
2010–11	Malmö Redhawks	J20	37	14	18	32	20	5	2	2	4	0
2011–12	Malmö Redhawks	J20	46	21	30	51	56	5	1	1	2	0
2011–12	Malmö Redhawks	Allsv	2	0	0	0	0	—	—	—	—	—
2012–13	Frederikshavn White Hawks	DEN	36	9	13	22	22	16	5	4	9	2
2013–14	Frederikshavn White Hawks	DEN	40	19	23	42	14	11	5	4	9	2
2014–15	Frederikshavn White Hawks	DEN	34	12	7	19	10	9	3	1	4	4
2015–16	Aalborg Pirates	DEN	45	30	43	73	6	4	0	2	2	4
2016–17	Västerviks IK	Allsv	19	2	11	13	2	—	—	—	—	—
2016–17	Tingsryds AIF	Allsv	24	3	12	15	4	5	0	3	3	4
2017–18	IF Troja/Ljungby	Allsv	52	19	20	39	16	—	—	—	—	—
2018–19	Södertälje SK	Allsv	52	29	33	62	8	—	—	—	—	—
2019–20	Malmö Redhawks	SHL	40	3	11	14	31	—	—	—	—	—
2020–21	Ässät	Liiga	53	16	26	42	4	—	—	—	—	—
2021–22	Vienna Capitals	ICEHL	38	18	27	45	8	7	4	4	8	4
2022–23	HC Plzeň	ELH	6	0	0	0	0	—	—	—	—	—
2022–23	EC Red Bull Salzburg	ICEHL	31	8	18	26	8	14	1	6	7	4
2023–24	IF Björklöven	Allsv	43	12	15	27	2	—	—	—	—	—
2023-24	EC Red Bull Salzburg	ICEHL	4	1	4	5	4	19	5	6	11	10
2024–25	Södertälje SK	Allsv	47	23	29	52	8	12	5	9	14	2
2025-26	HK Olimpija	ICEHL	43	20	39	59	12	10	2	6	8	4
Liiga totals			53	16	26	42	4	—	—	—	—	—
SHL totals			40	3	11	14	31	—	—	—	—	—
ELH totals			6	0	0	0	0	—	—	—	—	—

=== International ===
Year	Team	Event	Result	GP	G	A	Pts	PIM
2010	Denmark	U18 D1	13th	5	1	5	6	2
2011	Denmark	WJC D1	12th	5	8	4	12	0
2011	Denmark	U18 D1	11th	5	7	10	17	0
2012	Denmark	WJC	10th	6	1	0	1	12
2013	Denmark	WJC D1A	15th	5	2	1	3	0
2017	Denmark	WC	12th	6	0	0	0	0
2019	Denmark	WC	11th	7	0	2	2	0
2021	Denmark	WC	12th	7	1	1	2	0
2022	Denmark	OG	7th	5	1	1	2	0
2022	Denmark	WC	9th	6	0	1	1	4
2025	Denmark	WC	4th	6	0	0	0	0
Junior totals				26	19	20	39	14
Senior totals				37	2	5	7	4
