= Morten Poulsen =

Danish ice hockey player (born 1988)

- Poulsen in 2026
- Born: 9 September 1988 (age 38) Herning, Denmark
- Height: 6 ft 0 in (183 cm)
- Weight: 185 lb (84 kg; 13 st 3 lb)
- Position: Winger
- Shoots: Left
- Metal team Former teams: Herning Blue Fox; Nordsjælland Cobras; IK Oskarshamn; Graz 99ers Lahti Pelicans; HC TWK Innsbruck
- National team: Denmark
- Playing career: 2007–present

Morten Poulsen (born 9 September 1988) is a Danish professional ice hockey player who is a winger for Herning Blue Fox of the Metal Ligaen.

== Playing career ==
Poulsen was brought up in the Herning Blue Fox system before moving to Nordsjælland Cobras for the 2008–09 season. After two seasons with the North Zealand club, he returned to Herning before the 2010-11 season. Back with his hometown team, he enjoyed considerable success playing on a line with North American imports Bryan Marshall and Kevin Gardner. Poulsen finished runner-up in the regular season points race with 25 goals and 35 assists for a total of 60 points in 39 games. He won the Danish championship with Herning in 2007, 2008, and 2011.

He signed with IK Oskarshamn of the Swedish second-tier league, the HockeyAllsvenskan, before the 2011-12 season. After four years with Oskarshamn, Poulsen left as a free agent to sign a one-year contract with Austrian club, Graz 99ers of the EBEL on 8 July 2015.

In May 2016, he signed with the Pelicans Lahti of the Finnish Liiga. After one year, Poulsen left Finland coming back to EBEL, signing a one-year deal with HC TWK Innsbruck.

== International play ==
Poulsen played for the Danish national team at the 2011, 2012, 2013, 2014, 2015, and 2016 World Championships.

== Career statistics ==
=== Regular season and playoffs ===
			Regular season					Playoffs
Season	Team	League	GP	G	A	Pts	PIM	GP	G	A	Pts	PIM
2004–05	Herning Blue Fox	DEN U20	28	14	13	27	10	—	—	—	—	—
2004–05	Herning Blue Fox II	DEN.2	15	5	1	6	4	—	—	—	—	—
2005–06	Herning Blue Fox	DEN U20	17	11	8	19	68	4	3	1	4	4
2005–06	Herning Blue Fox	DEN	9	0	0	0	2	3	0	0	0	0
2005–06	Herning Blue Fox II	DEN.2	17	21	14	35	10	5	6	5	11	4
2006–07	Herning Blue Fox	DEN U20	5	4	4	8	2	—	—	—	—	—
2006–07	Herning Blue Fox	DEN	27	2	0	2	4	14	0	0	0	0
2006–07	Herning Blue Fox II	DEN.2	14	14	11	25	14	—	—	—	—	—
2007–08	Herning Blue Fox	DEN	40	8	9	17	10	16	1	1	2	2
2007–08	Herning Blue Fox	DEN U20	—	—	—	—	—	1	1	0	1	0
2008–09	Nordsjælland Cobras	DEN	38	6	8	14	2	4	0	2	2	0
2008–09	Gladsaxe/Rungsted II	DEN.2	—	—	—	—	—	3	0	0	0	2
2009–10	Rungsted Cobras	DEN	36	18	15	33	18	5	1	2	3	2
2010–11	Herning Blue Fox	DEN	39	25	35	60	6	14	9	13	22	4
2011–12	IK Oskarshamn	Allsv	50	14	15	29	8	6	1	2	3	0
2012–13	IK Oskarshamn	Allsv	50	15	12	27	12	6	3	2	5	0
2013–14	IK Oskarshamn	Allsv	43	9	10	19	6	—	—	—	—	—
2014–15	IK Oskarshamn	Allsv	47	16	12	28	4	—	—	—	—	—
2015–16	Graz99ers	AUT	54	14	17	31	8	—	—	—	—	—
2016–17	Pelicans	Liiga	49	8	7	15	2	5	0	0	0	2
2017–18	HC TWK Innsbruck	AUT	42	9	14	23	16	4	0	0	0	2
2018–19	Herning Blue Fox	DEN	40	13	12	25	6	5	3	2	5	2
2019–20	Herning Blue Fox	DEN	42	22	22	44	14	—	—	—	—	—
2020–21	Herning Blue Fox	DEN	40	15	13	28	6	4	5	2	7	0
2021–22	Herning Blue Fox	DEN	39	17	17	34	4	5	2	2	4	2
2022–23	Herning Blue Fox	DEN	46	16	20	36	2	18	8	9	17	0
2023–24	Herning Blue Fox	DEN	40	13	16	29	4	12	5	3	8	2
DEN totals			436	155	167	322	78	100	34	36	70	14
Allsv totals			190	54	49	103	30	12	4	4	8	0

=== International ===
Year	Team	Event	GP	G	A	Pts	PIM
2006	Denmark	U18 D1	5	1	3	4	6
2007	Denmark	WJC D1	5	6	0	6	0
2008	Denmark	WJC	6	2	1	3	0
2011	Denmark	WC	6	0	0	0	0
2012	Denmark	WC	7	1	0	1	0
2013	Denmark	OGQ	3	1	0	1	0
2013	Denmark	WC	7	1	0	1	2
2014	Denmark	WC	7	1	0	1	0
2015	Denmark	WC	4	0	0	0	2
2016	Denmark	WC	8	1	0	1	0
2017	Denmark	WC	7	2	0	2	0
2019	Denmark	WC	7	3	0	3	0
2021	Denmark	WC	7	0	0	0	0
2021	Denmark	OGQ	3	2	0	2	0
2022	Denmark	OG	5	1	0	1	0
2022	Denmark	WC	7	0	1	1	2
2023	Denmark	WC	7	1	0	1	2
2024	Denmark	WC	7	0	1	1	2
2024	Denmark	OGQ	3	0	1	1	0
2025	Denmark	WC	10	0	0	0	2
2026	Denmark	OG	4	0	0	0	0
2026	Denmark	WC	7	0	0	0	2
Junior totals			16	9	4	13	6
Senior totals			116	14	3	17	14
