= Phillip Bruggisser =

Danish ice hockey player (born 1991)

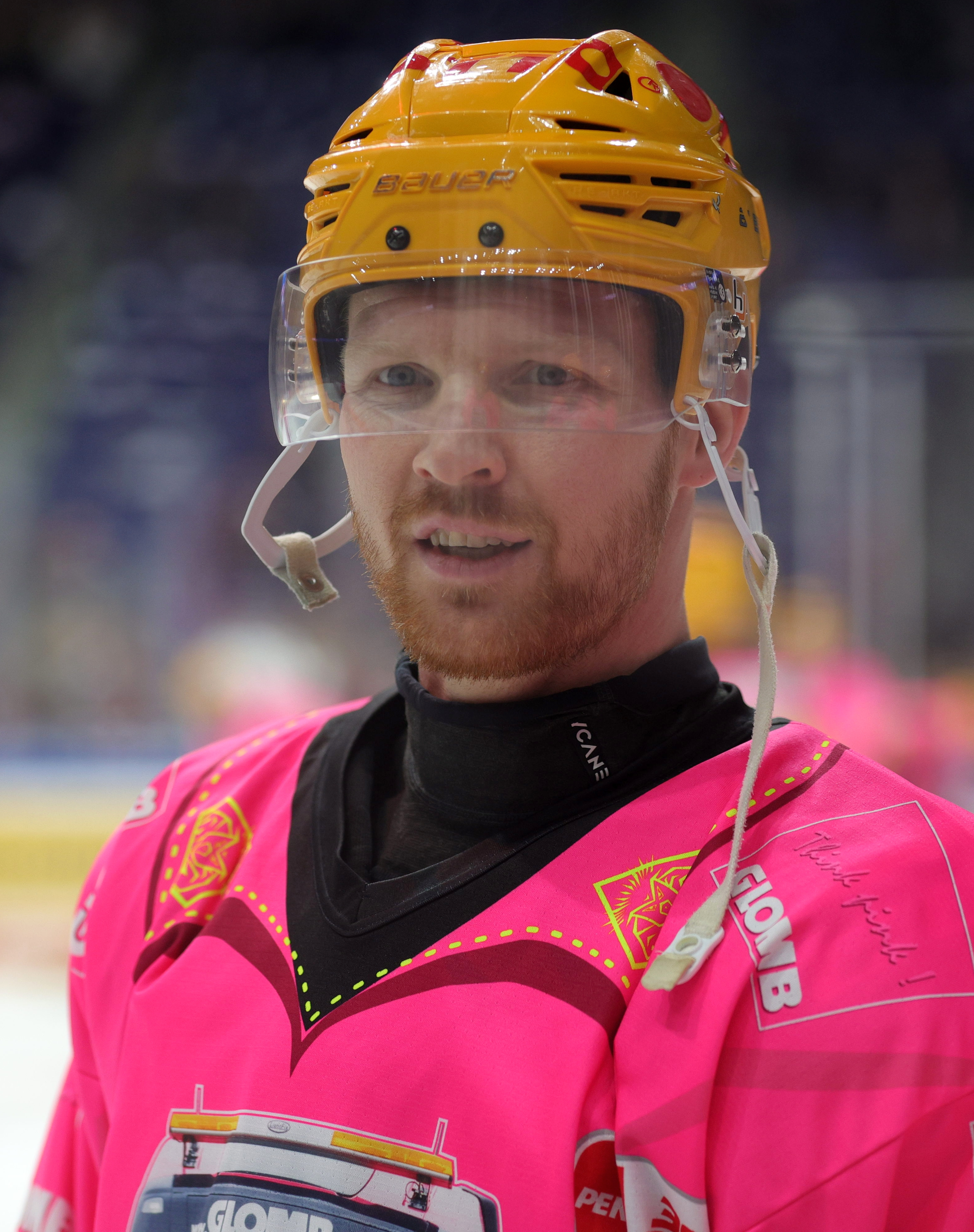
- Phillip Bruggisser playing for Fischtown Pinguins, 2024
- Born: 7 August 1991 (age 34) Rødovre, Denmark
- Height: 6 ft 0 in (183 cm)
- Weight: 187 lb (85 kg; 13 st 5 lb)
- Position: Defence
- Shoots: Right
- DEL team Former teams: Fischtown Pinguins; Esbjerg Energy; Almtuna IS; Rødovre Mighty Bulls; Krefeld Pinguine; Grizzlys Wolfsburg; EC KAC
- National team: Denmark
- Playing career: 2009–present

Phillip Bruggisser (born 7 August 1991) is a Danish professional ice hockey player who is a defenceman for the Fischtown Pinguins of the Deutsche Eishockey Liga (DEL).

== Career ==
Bruggisser was named to the Denmark men's national ice hockey team for the 2014 IIHF World Championship.

== Career statistics ==
=== Regular season and playoffs ===
			Regular season					Playoffs
Season	Team	League	GP	G	A	Pts	PIM	GP	G	A	Pts	PIM
2006–07	Rødovre Mighty Bulls	DEN U20	5	0	1	1	0	—	—	—	—	—
2006–07	Rødovre SIK	DEN.2	1	0	0	0	2	—	—	—	—	—
2007–08	Esbjerg fB	DEN U17	8	1	5	6	4	—	—	—	—	—
2007–08	Esbjerg fB	DEN U20	10	3	2	5	2	4	0	1	1	4
2007–08	Esbjerg fB II	DEN.2	16	3	6	9	64	—	—	—	—	—
2008–09	Esbjerg fB	DEN U20	24	7	11	18	36	3	0	1	1	2
2008–09	Esbjerg fB	DEN	8	0	0	0	0	—	—	—	—	—
2009–10	Esbjerg fB	DEN	35	1	7	8	26	5	0	0	0	0
2010–11	Esbjerg fB	DEN	39	5	12	17	24	—	—	—	—	—
2011–12	Esbjerg fB	DEN	40	5	9	14	18	5	0	0	0	4
2012–13	IF Sundsvall Hockey	SWE.3	38	11	24	35	59	3	0	0	0	2
2013–14	Kristianstads IK	SWE.3	40	16	19	35	55	7	2	0	2	29
2014–15	Almtuna IS	Allsv	12	0	3	3	0	—	—	—	—	—
2014–15	Kristianstads IK	SWE.3	26	4	8	12	30	5	0	1	1	2
2015–16	Rødovre Mighty Bulls	DEN	45	6	27	33	110	6	2	1	3	4
2016–17	Esbjerg Energy	DEN	36	6	16	22	42	18	3	2	5	12
2017–18	Esbjerg Energy	DEN	50	7	18	25	20	14	3	11	14	2
2018–19	Krefeld Pinguine	DEL	52	9	27	36	55	—	—	—	—	—
2019–20	Krefeld Pinguine	DEL	52	13	18	31	22	—	—	—	—	—
2020–21	Grizzlys Wolfsburg	DEL	25	2	4	7	4	9	1	2	3	4
2021–22	EC KAC	ICEHL	8	0	2	2	8	—	—	—	—	—
2021–22	Fischtown Penguins	DEL	41	13	20	33	16	5	1	2	3	4
2022–23	Fischtown Penguins	DEL	56	7	24	31	30	8	3	2	5	11
2023–24	Fischtown Penguins	DEL	51	11	26	37	43	14	4	2	6	12
2024–25	Fischtown Penguins	DEL	52	10	30	40	24	6	1	5	6	0
DEN totals			253	30	89	119	240	48	8	14	22	22
DEL totals			329	65	150	215	194	42	10	13	23	31

=== International ===
Year	Team	Event	GP	G	A	Pts	PIM
2009	Denmark	U18 D1	5	1	1	2	4
2011	Denmark	WJC D1	5	0	3	3	4
2014	Denmark	WC	7	0	0	0	0
2017	Denmark	WC	7	0	0	0	0
2019	Denmark	WC	6	1	0	1	0
2021	Denmark	WC	1	0	0	0	0
2022	Denmark	OG	2	0	0	0	0
2024	Denmark	WC	7	1	4	5	4
2024	Denmark	OGQ	3	0	0	0	2
2025	Denmark	WC	10	0	3	3	2
2026	Denmark	OG	4	1	0	1	2
2026	Denmark	WC	7	0	4	4	2
Junior totals			10	1	4	5	8
Senior totals			54	3	11	14	12
