= Jesper Jensen (ice hockey, born 1987) =

Danish ice hockey player (born 1987)

- Born: 5 February 1987 (age 39) Nybro, Sweden
- Height: 6 ft 0 in (183 cm)
- Weight: 176 lb (80 kg; 12 st 8 lb)
- Position: Forward
- Shoots: Left
- Metal team Former teams: Frederikshavn White Hawks; Hamburg Freezers; Rögle BK; Brynäs IF; Skellefteå AIK; Malmö Redhawks
- National team: Denmark
- Playing career: 2005–present

Jesper Jensen (born 5 February 1987) is a Danish professional ice hockey forward who is currently playing with the Frederikshavn White Hawks of the Metal Ligaen (DEN).

== Playing career ==
While in his third season with Brynäs IF in the 2018–19 campaign, having recorded 7 points through 26 games, Jensen left the club and immediately joined Skellefteå AIK for the remainder of the season on 23 January 2019. He contributed with three assists in the final ten regular season games before making six post-season appearances.

On 25 April 2019, as a free agent, Jensen agreed to a one-year contract with the Malmö Redhawks, his fourth SHL club.

== International play ==
He participated at the 2010 IIHF World Championship as a member of the Denmark National men's ice hockey team.

== Career statistics ==
=== Regular season and playoffs ===
			Regular season					Playoffs
Season	Team	League	GP	G	A	Pts	PIM	GP	G	A	Pts	PIM
2004–05	Frederikshavn White Hawks	DEN U20	30	33	14	47	48	—	—	—	—	—
2004–05	Frederikshavn White Hawks II	DEN.2	16	6	6	12	18	—	—	—	—	—
2005–06	Frederikshavn White Hawks	DEN U20	26	35	20	55	94	2	1	0	1	2
2005–06	Frederikshavn White Hawks II	DEN.2	20	13	8	21	58	—	—	—	—	—
2006–07	Frederikshavn White Hawks	DEN	32	0	0	0	4	4	0	0	0	0
2006–07	Frederikshavn White Hawks II	DEN.2	21	11	5	16	20	—	—	—	—	—
2007–08	IC Gentofte	DEN U20	25	26	23	49	28	3	1	0	1	4
2007–08	IC Gentofte	DEN.2	19	16	12	28	6	7	6	7	13	0
2008–09	Frederikshavn White Hawks	DEN	44	5	12	17	30	7	0	0	0	2
2009–10	Frederikshavn White Hawks	DEN	35	16	25	41	32	11	2	9	11	27
2010–11	Frederikshavn White Hawks	DEN	39	16	31	47	73	15	5	10	15	8
2011–12	Hamburg Freezers	DEL	50	5	6	11	12	5	0	0	0	0
2012–13	Karlskrona HK	Allsv	42	7	12	19	24	10	5	9	14	10
2013–14	Karlskrona HK	Allsv	46	17	21	38	30	6	4	4	8	0
2014–15	Rögle BK	Allsv	51	16	32	48	22	8	3	6	9	0
2015–16	Rögle BK	SHL	17	1	3	4	2	—	—	—	—	—
2016–17	Brynäs IF	SHL	50	9	33	42	14	20	3	7	10	10
2017–18	Brynäs IF	SHL	43	7	17	24	18	8	0	4	4	8
2018–19	Brynäs IF	SHL	26	3	4	7	14	—	—	—	—	—
2018–19	Skellefteå AIK	SHL	10	0	3	3	29	6	0	0	0	2
2019–20	Malmö Redhawks	SHL	50	4	12	16	18	—	—	—	—	—
2020–21	Frederikshavn White Hawks	DEN	45	16	36	52	24	7	2	0	2	4
2021–22	Frederikshavn White Hawks	DEN	41	4	19	23	14	5	0	1	1	0
DEN totals			236	57	123	180	177	49	9	20	29	41
Allsv totals			139	40	65	105	76	24	12	19	31	10

=== International ===
Year	Team	Event	GP	G	A	Pts	PIM
2005	Denmark	WJC18	6	1	0	1	0
2009	Denmark	WC	3	0	0	0	0
2010	Denmark	WC	4	0	0	0	0
2011	Denmark	WC	6	0	0	0	4
2012	Denmark	WC	7	2	0	2	12
2013	Denmark	OGQ	3	0	1	1	2
2013	Denmark	WC	7	0	0	0	0
2014	Denmark	WC	7	3	1	4	2
2015	Denmark	WC	7	0	2	2	2
2018	Denmark	WC	7	2	0	2	2
2019	Denmark	WC	7	2	2	4	2
2021	Denmark	WC	7	0	0	0	6
2021	Denmark	OGQ	2	1	0	1	0
2022	Denmark	OG	5	0	0	0	2
Junior totals			6	1	0	1	0
Senior totals			72	10	6	16	34
