= Alfie Michaud =

Canadian ice hockey player

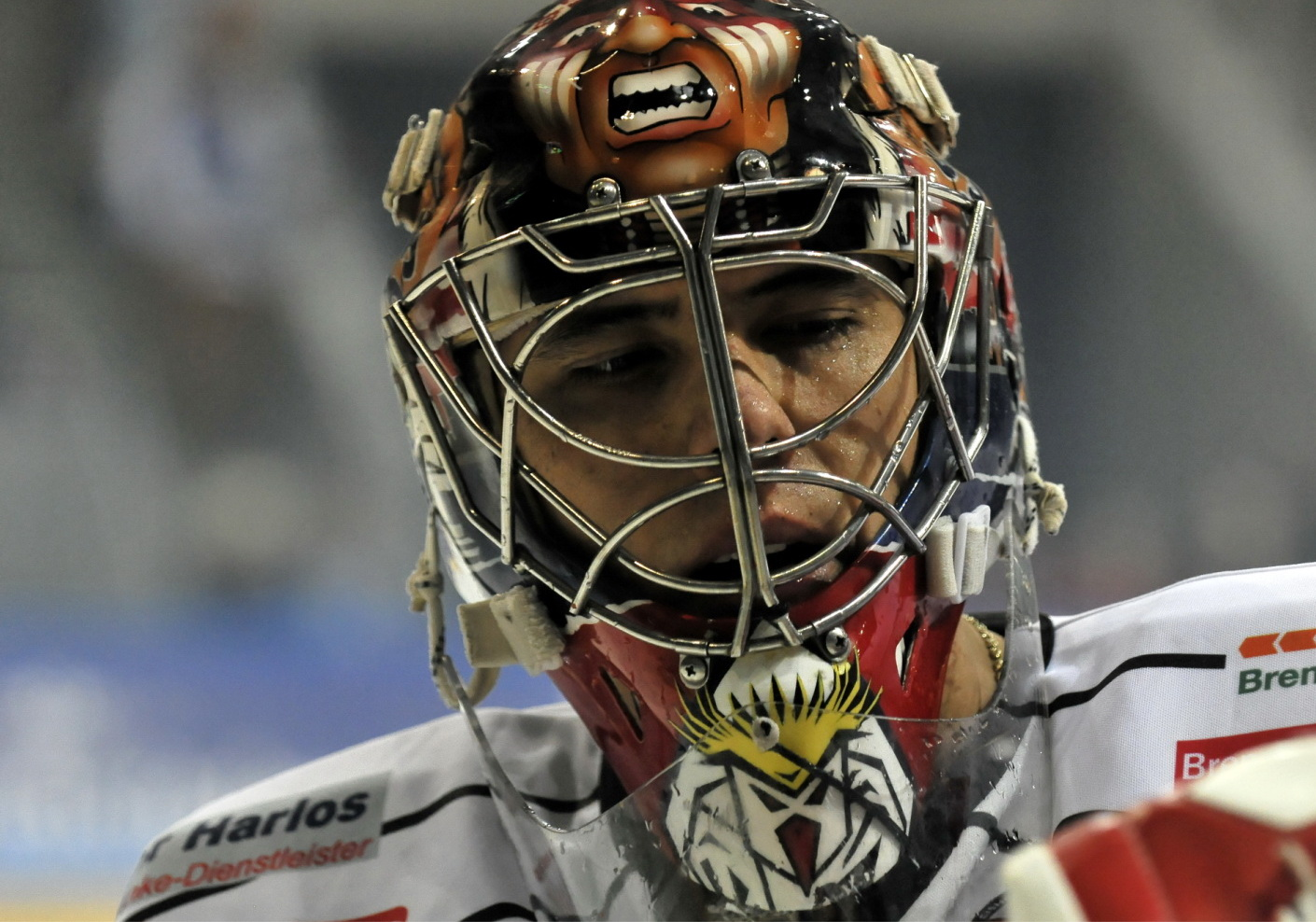
- Michaud in 2008
- Born: November 6, 1976 (age 49) Selkirk, Manitoba, Canada
- Height: 5 ft 10 in (178 cm)
- Weight: 180 lb (82 kg; 12 st 12 lb)
- Position: Goaltender
- Caught: Left
- Played for: Vancouver Canucks; Syracuse Crunch (AHL); Manitoba Moose (AHL); Worcester IceCats (AHL)
- NHL draft: Undrafted
- Playing career: 1999–2014
- Coaching career

Current position
- Title: Assistant coach
- Team: Maine
- Conference: Hockey East

Biographical details
- Education: University of Maine

Coaching career (HC unless noted)
- 2014–2015: Portland Pirates (goaltending)
- 2015–2017: Maine (goaltending)
- 2017–Present: Maine (assistant)

Alfred Michaud (born November 6, 1976) is a Canadian former professional ice hockey goaltender. An Ojibwe, Michaud played junior seasons in the SJHL, and then began a three-year tenure with the Maine Black Bears, winning an NCAA Men's Ice Hockey Championship during his college career. Michaud turned professional with the Vancouver Canucks' American Hockey League (AHL) affiliate, the Syracuse Crunch in 1999. He played 2 games for the Canucks in 1999. He finished his professional career playing in the top Danish ice hockey league Superisligaen. He is currently the assistant coach for his alma mater Black Bears, and runs a goalie school, Dream Catcher's Hockey.

== Career ==
Never drafted into the NHL, Michaud signed a pro contract with the Vancouver Canucks in 1999 following success at the University of Maine in which he posted a 28–6–3 record with a 2.32 GAA. He would appear in 38 games in his first professional season for the Syracuse Crunch, Vancouver's AHL affiliate, and received a two-game call-up to the Canucks during an injury crunch, making his NHL debut on October 28 against the Phoenix Coyotes. His second and last NHL game was on November 7 against the St. Louis Blues. For the next two seasons, he continued to play in minor pro but did not receive another chance at the NHL level.

Michaud was released by the Canucks in 2002, and had stints in the ECHL with the Reading Royals, Peoria Rivermen, and Utah Grizzlies. He ended his career overseas with the Fischtown Pinguins in Germany and finally with SønderjyskE in Denmark.

During the 2010–11 season in Denmark, he set a shutout record by going 360:58 without allowing a goal; the previous record in Denmark was 242 minutes.

== Career statistics ==
=== Regular season and playoffs ===
			Regular season									Playoffs
Season	Team	League	GP	W	L	T	MIN	GA	SO	GAA	SV%	GP	W	L	MIN	GA	SO	GAA	SV%
1994–95	Lebret Eagles	SJHL	32	—	—	—	—	—	—	3.80	—	—	—	—	—	—	—	—	—
1995–96	Lebret Eagles	SJHL	44	—	—	—	—	—	—	2.85	—	—	—	—	—	—	—	—	—
1996–97	University of Maine	HE	29	17	8	1	1515	78	1	3.09	.864	—	—	—	—	—	—	—	—
1997–98	University of Maine	HE	32	15	12	4	1794	94	2	3.14	.890	—	—	—	—	—	—	—	—
1998–99	University of Maine	HE	37	28	6	3	2147	83	3	2.32	.910	—	—	—	—	—	—	—	—
1999–00	Syracuse Crunch	AHL	38	10	17	5	2052	132	0	3.86	.890	—	—	—	—	—	—	—	—
1999–00	Vancouver Canucks	NHL	2	0	1	0	70	5	0	4.35	.815	—	—	—	—	—	—	—	—
2000–01	Kansas City Blades	IHL	32	14	14	2	1778	93	1	3.14	.904	—	—	—	—	—	—	—	—
2001–02	Manitoba Moose	AHL	32	16	10	1	1749	93	4	2.68	.907	7	3	4	424	19	0	2.69	.892
2001–02	Reading Royals	ECHL	11	5	3	2	606	26	2	2.58	.915	—	—	—	—	—	—	—	—
2002–03	Peoria Rivermen	ECHL	30	20	4	4	1685	59	1	2.10	.927	2	0	2	141	8	0	3.40	.846
2003–04	Nürnberg Ice Tigers	DEL	20	—	—	—	1184	47	2	2.38	.908	3	—	—	—	—	—	0.57	.977
2004–05	Peoria Rivermen	ECHL	48	27	13	5	2712	92	6	2.04	.929	—	—	—	—	—	—	—	—
2004–05	Worcester IceCats	AHL	2	2	0	0	120	3	0	1.50	.930	—	—	—	—	—	—	—	—
2005–06	Utah Grizzlies	ECHL	40	22	12	4	2248	97	4	2.59	.912	4	0	4	238	14	0	3.53	.861
2006–07	Fischtown Pinguins	GER-2	49	—	—	—	—	—	—	2.57	—	6	—	—	—	—	—	2.27	—
2007–08	Fischtown Pinguins	GER-2	46	—	—	—	—	—	—	3.19	—	7	—	—	—	—	—	2.20	—
2008–09	Fischtown Pinguins	GER-2	44	—	—	—	—	—	—	2.82	—	6	—	—	—	—	—	3.63	—
2009–10	SønderjyskE	DEN	25	—	—	—	—	—	—	1.51	.920	13	—	—	—	—	—	1.35	.947
2010–11	SønderjyskE	DEN	24	—	—	—	—	—	—	1.08	.953	1	—	—	—	—	—	0.00	1.000
2011–12	SønderjyskE	DEN	23	—	—	—	—	—	—	1.78	.924	8	—	—	—	—	—	1.59	.938
2012–13	SønderjyskE	DEN	25	—	—	—	—	—	—	1.94	.926	18	—	—	—	—	—	1.49	.945
2013–14	SønderjyskE	DEN	32	—	—	—	—	—	—	2.06	.914	16	—	—	—	—	—	1.68	.924
NHL totals			2	0	1	0	70	5	0	4.35	.815	—	—	—	—	—	—	—	—

== Awards and honors ==
Award	Year
Hockey East All-Tournament Team	1998
All-NCAA All-Tournament Team	1999
NCAA Tournament MVP	1999

Awards and achievements
Preceded by Marty Turco	NCAA Tournament Most Outstanding Player; 1999	Succeeded by Lee Goren
