= Dean Fedorchuk =

Canadian ice hockey player and coach

- Born: July 28, 1970 (age 56) Winnipeg, Manitoba, Canada
- Height: 5 ft 7 in (170 cm)
- Weight: 165 lb (75 kg; 11 st 11 lb)
- Position: Centre
- Shot: Left
- Played for: Kalamazoo Wings; Dayton Bombers; EHC Neuwied; Heilbronner EC; SC Bietigheim-Bissingen; SønderjyskE Ishockey; Odense Bulldogs
- Playing career: 1994–2008

Dean Fedorchuk (/fəˈdɔːrtʃʌk/ fə-DOR-chuk; born July 28, 1970, in Winnipeg, Manitoba) is a Canadian professional ice hockey coach and former professional ice hockey centre.

== Playing career ==
After playing for the Winnipeg South Blues in the MJHL, Fedorchuk enrolled at the University of Alaska-Fairbanks in 1990. During his four-year career with the Nanooks, he served as a team captain his sophomore, junior and senior season. He left school in 1994 as the leading goal scorer in program's history and second all-time in career points. Fedorchuk played a total of 144 games for Alaska-Fairbanks, tallying 113 goals and 102 assists. He was named to the All-America First Team his senior year. In 2014, he was inducted into the Nanook Hall of Fame.

He turned pro in 1994 and would spend most of his professional in Europe. The 1994–95 season saw him skate for the Kalamazoo Wings of the IHL and the Dayton Bombers of the ECHL. In 1995, Fedorchuk embarked on a five-year stint with German second-division team EHC Neuwied, where he continued his scoring prowess. In 95-96 and 97–98, he led the league in goals scored, while guiding Neuwied to back-to-back championship titles in 96 and 97. For his efforts, he received 2. Bundesliga Player of the Year honors following the 95-96 campaign. Statistically his best season in Germany came in 1996–97, when he tallied 47 goals and 49 assists in 56 games.

After stints with two other German second-division teams, Heilbronner EC and SC Bietingheim-Bissingen, Fedorchuk took his game to Denmark in 2001. He spent five years with SønderjyskE Ishockey and another two with the Odense Bulldogs. Fedorchuk led the Danish league in goal scoring in the 2002–03 and 2006–07 season and was named MVP of the 2006 playoffs, en route to the Danish championship with SønderjyskE. He called it a career after the 2007–08 season.

== Career statistics ==
			Regular season					Playoffs
Season	Team	League	GP	G	A	Pts	PIM	GP	G	A	Pts	PIM
1990–91	University of Alaska Fairbanks	NCAA	35	14	20	34	50	—	—	—	—	—
1991–92	University of Alaska Fairbanks	NCAA	35	29	14	43	45	—	—	—	—	—
1992–93	University of Alaska Fairbanks	NCAA	36	28	36	64	48	—	—	—	—	—
1993–94	University of Alaska Fairbanks	NCAA	38	42	32	74	88	—	—	—	—	—
1994–95	Kalamazoo Wings	IHL	28	4	9	13	8	—	—	—	—	—
1994–95	Dayton Bombers	ECHL	15	8	11	19	12	9	5	2	7	6
1995–96	EHC Neuwied	Germany2	45	34	48	82	78	—	—	—	—	—
1996–97	EHC Neuwied	Germany2	56	47	49	96	73	—	—	—	—	—
1997–98	EHC Neuwied	Germany2	68	42	26	68	76	—	—	—	—	—
1998–99	EHC Neuwied	Germany2	55	31	28	59	61	—	—	—	—	—
1999–00	EHC Neuwied	Germany2	20	12	11	23	18	—	—	—	—	—
1999–00	Heilbronner EC	Germany2	10	4	0	4	8	—	—	—	—	—
2000–01	SC Bietigheim-Bissingen	Germany2	44	15	14	29	28	4	2	0	2	0
2001–02	Vojens Lions	Denmark	42	36	19	55	90	—	—	—	—	—
2002–03	Vojens Lions	Denmark	30	26	11	37	14	—	—	—	—	—
2003–04	IK Sønderjylland	Denmark	36	20	14	34	75	5	3	1	4	2
2004–05	SønderjyskE	Denmark	35	17	18	35	53	4	1	1	2	2
2005–06	SønderjyskE	Denmark	36	20	12	32	47	18	8	11	19	16
2006–07	Odense Bulldogs	Denmark	36	28	11	39	50	6	3	1	4	6
2007–08	Odense Bulldogs	Denmark	41	12	17	29	26	11	4	4	8	2
Germany2 totals			298	185	176	361	342	4	2	0	2	0
Denmark totals			256	159	102	261	355	44	19	18	37	28

== Coaching career ==
After retiring as a player, Fedorchuk was immediately named head coach of the Odense Bulldogs of the Danish top-flight. He led the Bulldogs to a Danish Cup title as a first-year head coach. In January 2010, Fedorchuk was removed from the head coaching position after a run of bad results.

He then was supposed to serve as head coach of the Kassel Huskies in Germany, but the team folded before the start of the 2010–11 season. In January 2011, Fedorchuk took over head coaching duties at Straubing Tigers of the German elite league Deutsche Eishockey Liga (DEL) for the remainder of the season, replacing Jürgen Rumrich who had been sacked.

From 2011 to 2013, he worked for the Winnipeg Jets of the National Hockey League (NHL) as a scout. In June 2013, Fedorchuk was named assistant coach of KHL Medveščak Zagreb of the Kontinental Hockey League (KHL). He remained in that job until the end of the 2014–15 season.

In June 2017, he was named assistant coach to Mark French at HC Fribourg-Gottéron in the Swiss top flight National League.

Awards and achievements
Preceded by Paul Kariya	NCAA Ice Hockey Scoring Champion; 1993–94 (with Tavis MacMillan)	Succeeded by Brendan Morrison
