= Brian Casey (ice hockey) =

Canadian ice hockey player (born 1973)

- Born: January 10, 1973 (age 53) Saint John, New Brunswick, Canada
- Height: 6 ft 0 in (183 cm)
- Weight: 176 lb (80 kg; 12 st 8 lb)
- Position: Defense
- Shot: Left
- NHL draft: Undrafted
- Playing career: 1999–2009

Brian Casey (born January 10, 1973) is a Canadian former professional ice hockey defenceman who last played for AaB Ishockey in the Metal Ligaen in Denmark.

== Career statistics ==
			Regular season					Playoffs
Season	Team	League	GP	G	A	Pts	PIM	GP	G	A	Pts	PIM
1990–91	Kitchener Rangers	OHL	2	0	0	0	0	—	—	—	—	—
1992–93	Saint-Jean Lynx	QMJHL	58	1	28	29	41	4	0	0	0	8
1993–94	Saint-Jean Lynx	QMJHL	67	4	17	21	32	5	0	1	1	2
1999–00	VEU Feldkirch	IEL	25	1	9	10	59	—	—	—	—	—
1999–00	VEU Feldkirch	Austria	10	2	2	4	4	—	—	—	—	—
1999–00	Odessa Jackalopes	WPHL	3	0	0	0	0	2	0	1	1	0
2000–01	HC Slovan Bratislava	Slovak	45	6	18	24	52	8	2	2	4	4
2001–02	HC Slovan Bratislava	Slovak	41	2	11	13	26	9	0	4	4	8
2002–03	VEU Feldkirch	Austria	41	13	18	31	40	3	0	0	0	4
2003–04	VEU Feldkirch	EBEL	40	0	6	6	26	—	—	—	—	—
2004–05	SønderjyskE Ishockey	Denmark	35	3	19	22	32	4	0	0	0	12
2005–06	SønderjyskE Ishockey	Denmark	36	2	13	15	38	18	0	7	7	18
2006–07	AaB Ishockey	Denmark	31	2	12	14	48	17	0	6	6	22
2007–08	AaB Ishockey	Denmark	10	0	1	1	2	5	0	0	0	4
2008–09	AaB Ishockey	Denmark	22	0	5	5	12	4	0	0	0	2
Denmark totals			134	7	50	57	132	48	0	13	13	58
