= Emil Kristensen =

Danish ice hockey player

- Emil Kristensen, 2026.
- Born: 20 September 1992 (age 34) Esbjerg, Denmark
- Height: 6 ft 0 in (183 cm)
- Weight: 179 lb (81 kg; 12 st 11 lb)
- Position: Defence
- Shoots: Right
- ICEHL team Former teams: HC Pustertal Wölfe; Esbjerg Energy; Rögle BK; Linköpings HC; KooKoo; Schwenninger Wild Wings
- National team: Denmark
- Playing career: 2010–present

Emil Løjborg Kristensen (born 20 September 1992) is a Danish professional ice hockey defenceman. He is currently under contract with HC Pustertal Wölfe of the ICE Hockey League (ICEHL). He previously played with KooKoo in the Finnish Liiga, initially signing a one-year contract with the team in 2017 after playing in the Swedish Hockey League (SHL).

== International ==
Kristensen was named to the Denmark men's national ice hockey team for competition at the 2014, 2015, 2016, 2017 and 2018 IIHF World Championship tournaments.

== Career statistics ==
=== Regular season and playoffs ===
			Regular season					Playoffs
Season	Team	League	GP	G	A	Pts	PIM	GP	G	A	Pts	PIM
2007–08	Esbjerg fB Ishockey	DEN U17	14	2	1	3	10	—	—	—	—	—
2007–08	Esbjerg fB Ishockey II	DEN.2	3	1	0	1	6	—	—	—	—	—
2008–09	Esbjerg fB Ishockey	DEN U17	7	5	1	6	2	—	—	—	—	—
2008–09	Esbjerg fB Ishockey	DEN U20	21	1	2	3	8	2	1	0	1	0
2008–09	Esbjerg fB Ishockey II	DEN.2	1	0	0	0	4	—	—	—	—	—
2009–10	Esbjerg fB Ishockey	DEN	11	0	0	0	0	1	0	0	0	0
2009–10	Esbjerg fB Ishockey II	DEN.2	21	0	6	6	26	5	0	1	1	2
2010–11	Esbjerg fB Ishockey	DEN	39	4	3	7	33	—	—	—	—	—
2010–11	Esbjerg fB Ishockey II	DEN.2	2	0	0	0	4	3	0	0	0	4
2011–12	Esbjerg fB Ishockey	DEN	35	0	4	4	8	5	0	0	0	2
2012–13	Esbjerg fB Ishockey	DEN	39	5	17	22	44	6	0	2	2	10
2013–14	IK Oskarshamn	Allsv	50	3	9	12	18	—	—	—	—	—
2014–15	IK Oskarshamn	Allsv	50	8	8	16	26	—	—	—	—	—
2015–16	Rögle BK	J20	5	2	1	3	4	—	—	—	—	—
2015–16	Rögle BK	SHL	13	2	1	3	0	—	—	—	—	—
2015–16	IK Oskarshamn	Allsv	21	3	7	10	8	5	1	1	2	6
2016–17	Linköpings HC	SHL	23	3	3	6	6	3	1	0	1	0
2016–17	IK Oskarshamn	Allsv	2	1	0	1	0	—	—	—	—	—
2017–18	KooKoo	Liiga	52	7	10	17	38	—	—	—	—	—
2018–19	KooKoo	Liiga	6	0	1	1	2	—	—	—	—	—
2019–20	EVZ Academy	SUI.2	24	6	10	16	14	—	—	—	—	—
2020–21	Schwenninger Wild Wings	DEL	30	1	1	2	8	—	—	—	—	—
2021–22	HC Pustertal Wölfe	ICEHL	40	10	8	18	20	4	0	1	1	2
DEN totals			124	9	24	33	85	12	0	2	2	12
Allsv totals			123	15	24	39	52	5	1	1	2	6

=== International ===
Year	Team	Event	GP	G	A	Pts	PIM
2012	Denmark	WJC	6	1	0	1	0
2014	Denmark	WC	7	1	1	2	2
2015	Denmark	WC	7	0	0	0	6
2016	Denmark	WC	8	0	0	0	4
2016	Denmark	OGQ	3	0	0	0	0
2017	Denmark	WC	7	0	1	1	6
2018	Denmark	WC	7	0	0	0	4
2021	Denmark	WC	7	1	0	1	0
2021	Denmark	OGQ	3	0	0	0	0
2022	Denmark	OG	5	0	0	0	4
2022	Denmark	WC	7	0	0	0	6
Senior totals			61	2	2	4	32
