= Matias Lassen =

Danish ice hockey player (born 1996)

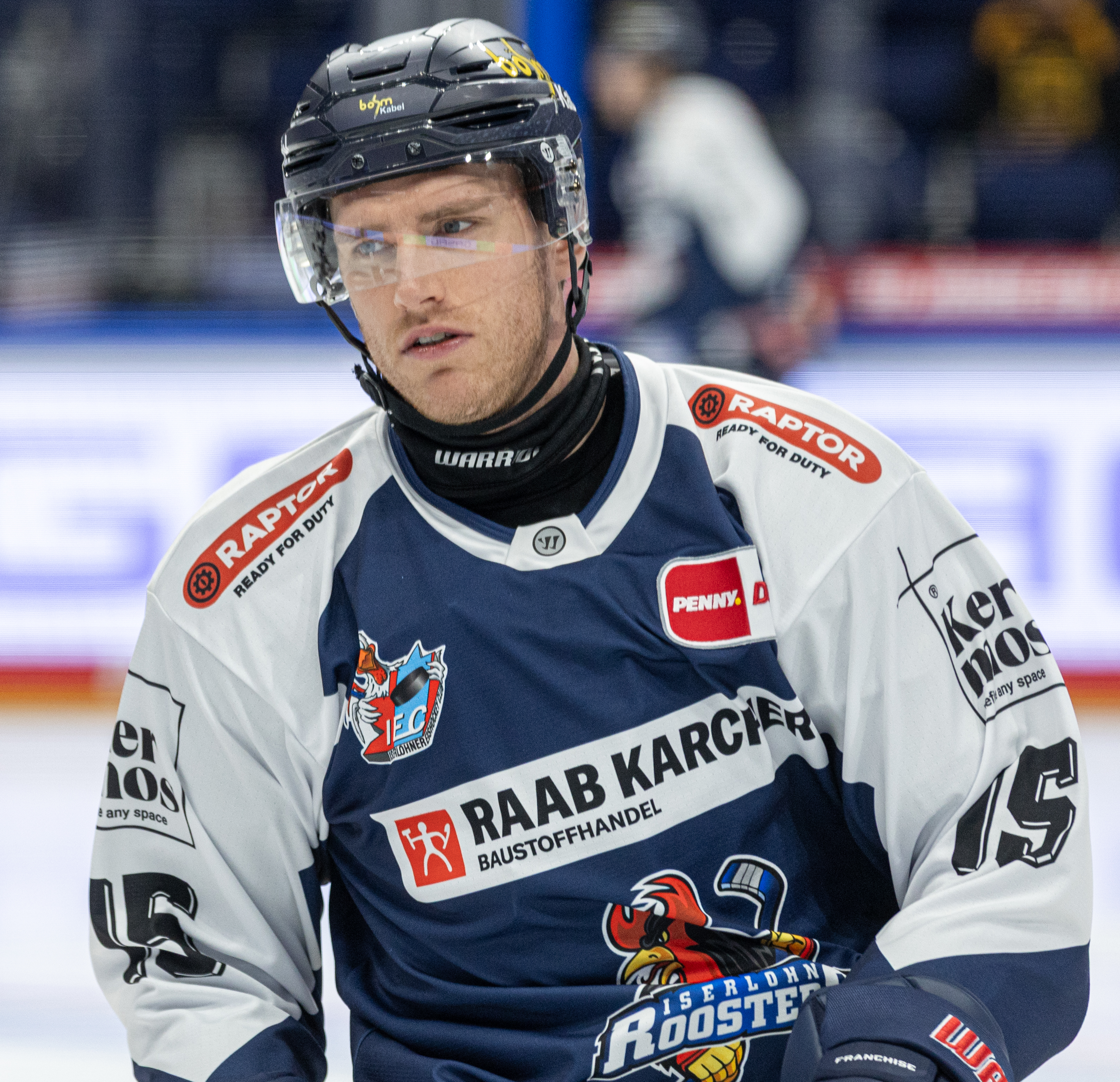
- Lassen with the Iserlohn Roosters in 2025
- Born: 15 March 1996 (age 30) Rødovre, Denmark
- Height: 6 ft 0 in (183 cm)
- Weight: 181 lb (82 kg; 12 st 13 lb)
- Position: Defence
- Shoots: Left
- DEL team Former teams: Iserlohn Roosters; Rødovre Mighty Bulls; Leksands IF; Mora IK; Malmö Redhawks
- National team: Denmark
- Playing career: 2012–present

Matias Lassen (born 15 March 1996) is a Danish professional ice hockey player who is a defenceman for the Iserlohn Roosters of the Deutsche Eishockey Liga (DEL).

== Playing career ==
Lassen made his Swedish Hockey League debut playing with Leksands IF during the 2016–17 SHL season.

He played with Malmö Redhawks for 8 seasons, before leaving to sign a one-year contract with German club, Iserlohn Roosters of the DEL, for the 2025–26 season on 16 July 2025.

== Career statistics ==
=== Regular season and playoffs ===
			Regular season					Playoffs
Season	Team	League	GP	G	A	Pts	PIM	GP	G	A	Pts	PIM
2010–11	Rødovre Mighty Bulls	DEN U17	15	5	4	9	2	—	—	—	—	—
2011–12	Rødovre Mighty Bulls	DEN U17	2	2	2	4	2	—	—	—	—	—
2011–12	Rødovre Mighty Bulls	DEN U20	19	6	7	13	2	3	1	0	1	6
2011–12	Rødovre SIK	DEN.2	26	3	3	6	8	11	1	3	4	12
2012–13	Rødovre Mighty Bulls	DEN U20	2	0	2	2	0	—	—	—	—	—
2012–13	Rødovre Mighty Bulls	DEN	39	1	2	3	10	11	0	1	1	16
2012–13	Rødovre SIK	DEN.2	5	0	3	3	0	—	—	—	—	—
2013–14	Rødovre Mighty Bulls	DEN	9	2	5	7	0	—	—	—	—	—
2014–15	Rødovre Mighty Bulls	DEN	23	1	1	2	2	5	0	1	1	0
2015–16	Leksands IF	J20	3	0	1	1	2	—	—	—	—	—
2015–16	Leksands IF	Allsv	44	3	6	9	12	11	0	2	2	6
2016–17	Leksands IF	J20	3	0	1	1	0	—	—	—	—	—
2016–17	Leksands IF	SHL	1	0	0	0	0	—	—	—	—	—
2016–17	Mora IK	Allsv	41	1	5	6	22	9	2	1	3	2
2017–18	Mora IK	SHL	17	0	0	0	6	—	—	—	—	—
2017–18	Malmö Redhawks	SHL	25	3	4	7	6	7	0	0	0	4
2018–19	IK Pantern	SHL	40	8	12	20	12	—	—	—	—	—
2018–19	Malmö Redhawks	SHL	13	1	2	3	0	—	—	—	—	—
2019–20	Malmö Redhawks	SHL	30	1	3	4	8	—	—	—	—	—
2020–21	Malmö Redhawks	SHL	32	1	2	3	6	2	2	0	2	0
2021–22	Malmö Redhawks	SHL	38	1	11	12	6	—	—	—	—	—
2022–23	Malmö Redhawks	SHL	33	1	7	8	8	—	—	—	—	—
2023–24	Malmö Redhawks	SHL	43	3	9	12	10	—	—	—	—	—
2024–25	Malmö Redhawks	SHL	39	0	4	4	8	8	0	1	1	4
SHL totals			271	11	42	53	58	17	2	1	3	8

=== International ===
Year	Team	Event	GP	G	A	Pts	PIM
2013	Denmark	U18 D1A	5	0	1	1	0
2015	Denmark	WJC	4	0	0	0	2
2016	Denmark	WJC	4	1	0	1	25
2017	Denmark	WC	7	0	0	0	2
2019	Denmark	WC	3	0	0	0	0
2021	Denmark	WC	7	0	2	2	6
2021	Denmark	OGQ	3	0	1	1	4
2022	Denmark	OG	5	0	1	1	2
2022	Denmark	WC	7	0	0	0	0
2023	Denmark	WC	7	2	1	3	6
2024	Denmark	WC	7	0	1	1	4
2024	Denmark	OGQ	3	0	1	1	0
2025	Denmark	WC	10	0	1	1	8
2026	Denmark	OG	4	0	0	0	0
Junior totals			13	1	1	2	27
Senior totals			63	2	8	10	32
