= Jesper Jensen Aabo =

Danish ice hockey player (born 1991)

- Jensen Aabo in 2026
- Born: 30 July 1991 (age 35) Rødovre, Denmark
- Height: 6 ft 0 in (183 cm)
- Weight: 181 lb (82 kg; 12 st 13 lb)
- Position: Defence
- Shoots: Left
- ICEHL team Former teams: EC KAC; Rødovre Mighty Bulls; Rögle BK; Färjestad BK; Jokerit; Malmö Redhawks; Krefeld Pinguine
- National team: Denmark
- Playing career: 2008–present

Jesper B. Jensen Aabo (born 30 July 1991) is a Danish professional ice hockey player who is a defenceman for EC KAC of the ICE Hockey League (ICEHL). He was a member of the Denmark men's national ice hockey team for the 2011 World Championship. At just 19 years of age, he was the youngest member of the Danish team.

== Playing career ==
Having played all of his youth hockey with Rødovre as well as three seasons with Rødovre Mighty Bulls of the Danish Elite League, Jensen Aabo is regarded as one of the most talented defencemen to come out of Denmark in recent years, he was sought after by Rögle as well as Malmö Redhawks before deciding to join the Ängelholm team prior to the 2010–11 season.

After playing four seasons in the Kontinental Hockey League with Finnish club, Jokerit, Jensen Aabo left as a free agent following the 2018–19 season, returning to the SHL in agreeing to a two-year contract with the Malmö Redhawks on April 18, 2019.

Following a lone season in the Deutsche Eishockey Liga (DEL) with Krefeld Pinguine in 2021–22, Jensen Aabo moved to the neighbouring ICE Hockey League, joining Austrian based club, EC KAC, on 5 May 2022.

== Playing style ==
Jensen Aabo is considered an all-round defenceman with an emphasis on defensive and physical play.

== Career statistics ==
=== Regular season and playoffs ===
			Regular season					Playoffs
Season	Team	League	GP	G	A	Pts	PIM	GP	G	A	Pts	PIM
2006–07	Rødovre U20	Denmark U20	3	2	1	3	0	—	—	—	—	—
2007–08	Rødovre U20	Denmark U20	23	5	6	11	24	2	0	0	0	0
2007–08	Rødovre SIK	Division 1	17	4	4	8	30	2	0	0	0	12
2007–08	Rødovre Mighty Bulls	AL-Bank Ligaen	5	1	0	1	25	—	—	—	—	—
2008–09	Rødovre U20	Denmark U20	15	6	6	12	50	—	—	—	—	—
2008–09	Rødovre SIK	Division 1	8	1	5	6	2	—	—	—	—	—
2008–09	Rødovre Mighty Bulls	AL-Bank Ligaen	38	1	2	3	6	12	0	0	0	10
2009–10	Rødovre Mighty Bulls	AL-Bank Ligaen	35	3	12	15	46	—	—	—	—	—
2010–11	Rögle BK	HockeyAllsvenskan	42	1	5	6	12	8	1	1	2	0
2011–12	Rögle BK	HockeyAllsvenskan	50	6	13	19	40	10	2	1	3	6
2012–13	Rögle BK	Elitserien	43	1	6	7	40	10	2	5	7	2
2013–14	Rögle BK	HockeyAllsvenskan	51	3	12	15	109	9	3	0	3	6
2014–15	Färjestad BK	SHL	50	0	6	6	43	3	0	0	0	0
2015–16	Jokerit	KHL	52	4	4	8	61	6	1	1	2	2
2016–17	Jokerit	KHL	53	2	13	15	32	4	0	1	1	2
2017–18	Jokerit	KHL	47	0	4	4	30	5	0	0	0	27
2018–19	Jokerit	KHL	49	3	8	11	16	6	0	1	1	0
2019–20	Malmö Redhawks	SHL	51	5	16	21	20	—	—	—	—	—
2020–21	Malmö Redhawks	SHL	42	4	10	14	28	2	0	0	0	0
2021–22	Krefeld Pinguine	DEL	38	5	20	25	6	—	—	—	—	—
2022–23	EC KAC	ICEHL	31	3	9	12	18	10	2	2	4	2
2023–24	EC KAC	ICEHL	38	2	15	17	41	17	1	7	8	12
2024–25	EC KAC	ICEHL	38	5	22	27	47	17	0	5	5	36
2025–26	EC KAC	ICEHL	33	1	21	22	10	6	1	2	3	4
SHL totals			186	10	38	48	131	15	2	5	7	2
KHL totals			201	9	29	38	139	21	1	3	4	31

=== International ===
Year	Team	Event	GP	G	A	Pts	PIM
2008	Denmark U18	WJC-18	6	0	0	0	6
2009	Denmark U18	WJC-18 (D1)	5	1	4	5	14
2010	Denmark U20	WJC-20 (D1)	5	2	3	5	16
2011	Denmark U20	WJC-20 (D1)	5	0	4	4	2
2011	Denmark	WC	6	0	0	0	4
2012	Denmark	WC	7	0	1	1	0
2013	Denmark	OGQ	3	0	0	0	2
2013	Denmark	WC	7	0	1	1	8
2014	Denmark	WC	7	1	1	2	8
2015	Denmark	WC	6	0	1	1	0
2016	Denmark	WC	3	2	1	3	6
2016	Denmark	OGQ	3	0	1	1	0
2017	Denmark	WC	7	0	1	1	0
2018	Denmark	WC	7	1	4	5	16
2019	Denmark	WC	7	0	2	2	0
2021	Denmark	WC	7	0	1	1	4
2021	Denmark	OGQ	3	0	2	2	4
2022	Denmark	OG	3	0	0	0	4
2022	Denmark	WC	7	0	1	1	4
2023	Denmark	WC	7	1	2	3	4
2024	Denmark	WC	4	0	0	0	8
2024	Denmark	OGQ	3	0	0	0	0
2025	Denmark	WC	10	1	0	1	2
2026	Denmark	OG	4	0	1	1	0
2026	Denmark	WC	7	0	1	1	2
Junior totals			21	3	11	14	38
Senior totals			118	6	21	27	76
