= Patrick Galbraith (ice hockey) =

Danish ice hockey player

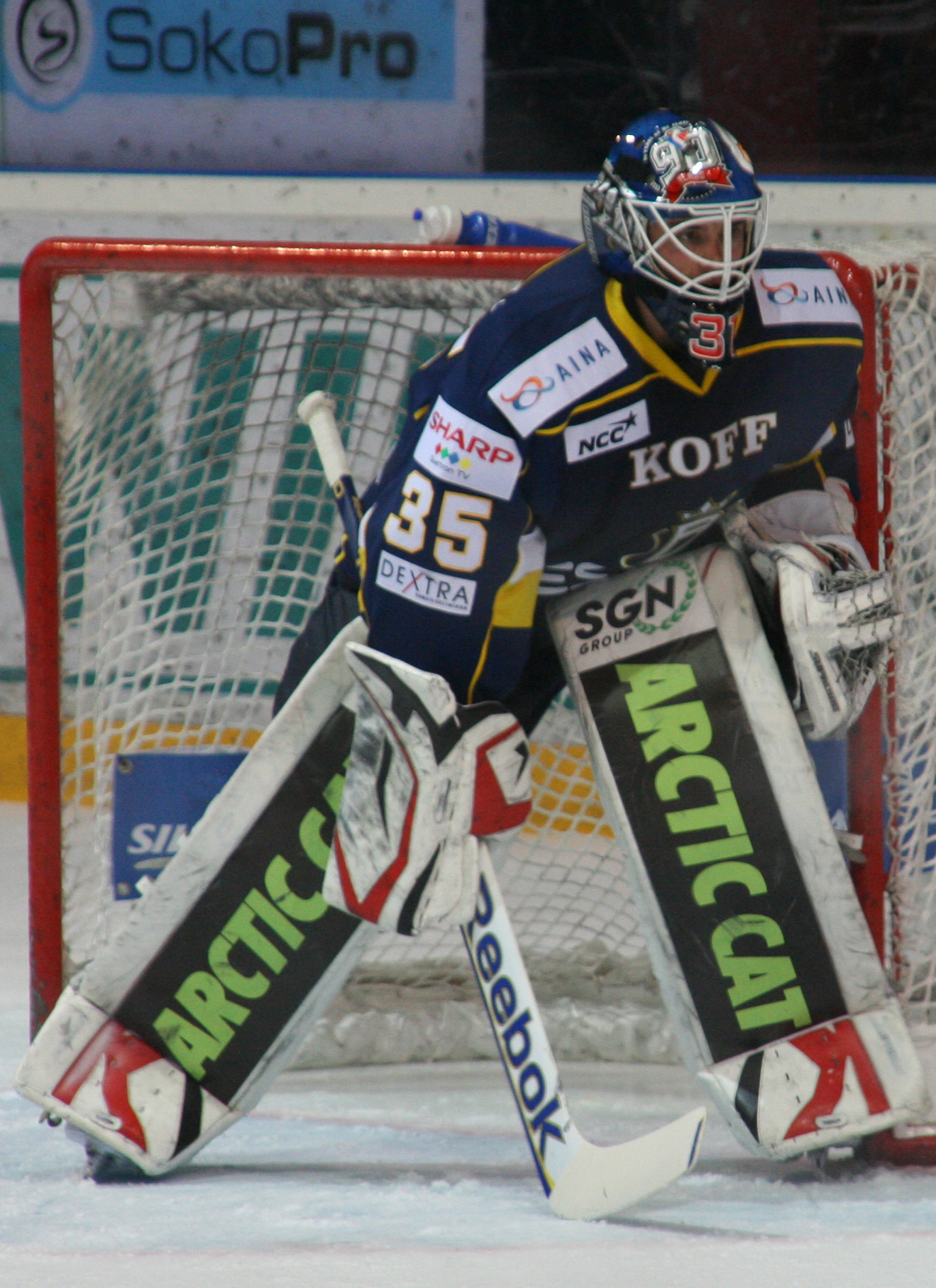
- Galbraith playing for Espoo Blues
- Born: 11 March 1986 (age 39) Haderslev, Denmark
- Height: 6 ft 0 in (183 cm)
- Weight: 179 lb (81 kg; 12 st 11 lb)
- Position: Goaltender
- Catches: Left
- Metal team Former teams: SønderjyskE; HC Slovan Bratislava; Espoo Blues; Frölunda HC; Karlskrona HK; Krefeld Pinguine; Nottingham Panthers
- National team: Denmark
- NHL draft: Undrafted
- Playing career: 2006–present

Patrick Galbraith (born March 11, 1986) is a Danish professional ice hockey goaltender. Gailbraith currently plays under contract with SønderjyskE in the Danish Metal Ligaen (DEN).

== Playing career ==
Galbraith spent the 2006-07 campaign with EJHL outfit New Hampshire Junior Monarchs. In his native Denmark, he played for Vojens IK.

Earlier in his career, he spent time with Swedish sides IK Oskarshamn, Frölunda HC, Leksands IF and IF Björklöven, had a short stint with HC Slovan Bratislava in Slovakia and was a member of the Espoo Blues in Finland. Galbraith played for Karlskrona HK in the HockeyAllsvenskan since 2013 before moving to Krefeld in December 2015.

After his first full season with the Pinguines in 2016–17, he appeared in 45 games but was unable to prevent the team from finishing last. Galbraith left the club on March 3, 2017, after it was revealed he would not be offered a new contract.

== International play ==
Galbraith participated at the 2010 IIHF World Championship as a member of the Denmark men's national ice hockey team.

== Personal ==
Patrick's father, George Galbraith, was also an ice hockey goaltender. A Canadian, George moved to Denmark in 1977 to play for Vojens IK.
