= Jesper B. Jensen =

Jesper B. Jensen may refer to:

- Jesper B. Monberg (born 1977), Danish speedway rider who was previously known as Jesper B. Jensen
- Jesper Jensen (ice hockey, born 1991), Danish ice hockey defenceman who is also known as Jesper B. Jensen
