= HFK =

HFK may refer to:

- University of the Arts Bremen (German: Hochschule für Künste Bremen, HfK Bremen)
- Hopeless Fountain Kingdom, 2017 studio album by Halsey
- Haderslev FK, Danish soccer club that currently participates in the multisports club SønderjyskE.
