= Brian Casey =

Brian Casey may refer to:

- Brian Casey (lawyer), president of Colgate University
- Brian Casey (ice hockey) (born 1973), Canadian ice hockey player
- Brian Casey, musician with Jagged Edge
