= George Galbraith =

Canadian-born Danish ice hockey player

- Born: December 16, 1955 (age 70) Pembroke, Ontario, Canada
- Height: 5 ft 11 in (180 cm)
- Weight: 168 lb (76 kg; 12 st 0 lb)
- Position: Goaltender
- Caught: Left
- Played for: Vojens IK (AL-Bank Ligaen)
- NHL draft: Undrafted
- Playing career: 1977–2001

George Galbraith (born December 16, 1955) is a Canadian-born Danish former professional ice hockey goaltender who was nicknamed King George by Danish media and fans. Galbraith played his entire 19-year career for Vojens IK (1977-2001), was named the Danish League Player of the Year in 1980, and holds the record as the oldest player to play in the Danish premiere league at age 46. Galbraith's dominance in goal is credited with leading Vojens to their first Danish championship in 1979. He played at the World Championships with Denmark men's national ice hockey team in 1986 and 1994. In 2017, Galbraith was inducted into the Danish Hockey Hall of Fame.

Galbraith was raised in Petawawa, Ontario and attended Clarkson University on a hockey scholarship from 1972 to 1976. His mother is of Native American descent. In 1982, he became a Danish citizen. He is the father of ice hockey player Patrick Galbraith.

== Awards and honours ==
Award	Year
Danish League Player of the Year	1979–80
