= 2001–02 Sanistål Ligaen season =

45th season of ice hockey in Denmark

The 2001–02 Sanistål Ligaen season was the 45th season of ice hockey in Denmark. Ten teams participated in the league, and Rungsted IK won the championship.

== First round ==
	Club	GP	W	T	L	GF	GA	Pts
1.	Rungsted IK	36	27	3	6	190	112	58
2.	Odense Bulldogs	36	24	2	10	141	89	51
3.	Frederikshavn White Hawks	36	23	3	10	152	112	50
4.	Herning IK	36	19	0	17	144	125	40
5.	Vojens IK	36	18	3	15	127	138	39
6.	Rødovre Mighty Bulls	36	13	4	19	138	139	33
7.	Herlev Hornets	36	14	4	18	142	139	33
8.	Hvidovre Ishockey	36	12	5	19	107	144	31
9.	Esbjerg IK	36	13	2	21	111	137	31
10.	AaB Ishockey	36	3	2	31	91	208	9

== Second round ==
=== Group A ===
	Club	GP	W	T	L	GF	GA	Pts (Bonus)
1.	Rungsted IK	6	6	0	0	42	14	14(2)
2.	Herning IK	6	3	0	3	23	18	7(1)
3.	Vojens IK	6	3	0	3	18	23	6(0)
4.	Hvidovre Ishockey	6	0	0	6	11	39	0(0)

=== Group B ===
	Club	GP	W	T	L	GF	GA	Pts (Bonus)
1.	Odense Bulldogs	6	4	1	1	30	13	11(2)
2.	Frederikshavn White Hawks	6	3	2	1	27	18	9(1)
3.	Rødovre Mighty Bulls	6	3	1	2	17	19	7(0)
4.	Herlev Hornets	6	0	0	6	14	38	0(0)

== Playoffs ==
Semi-finals
Rungsted IK	3
Frederikshavn White Hawks	1
Odense Bulldogs	3
Herning IK	1

Final
Rungsted IK	3
Odense Bulldogs	0
Third place
Frederikshavn White Hawks	0
Herning IK	2

== Relegation ==
	Club	GP	W	T	L	GF	GA	Pts
1.	Esbjerg IK	6	5	0	1	49	16	10
2.	AaB Ishockey	6	5	0	1	46	16	10
3.	IC Gentofte	6	1	1	4	14	48	3
4.	Gladsaxe SF	6	0	1	5	6	35	1
