= SønderjyskE =

Danish sports club

SønderjyskE is a Danish sport corporation. They have a football team (SønderjyskE Fodbold, based in Haderslev), two handball teams (SønderjyskE Håndbold, one male based in Sønderborg, one female based in Aabenraa) and an ice hockey team (SønderjyskE Ishockey, based in Vojens). All the teams play in Southern Jutland. The name is short for Sønderjysk Elitesport (English language: Southern Jutlandic Elite Sport).

SønderjyskE was created as a club for the whole region of South Jutland as it was obvious that it was impossible to create elite teams able to compete in the top leagues on the former basis of city teams. The men's football team used to be solely based in the city of Haderslev under the name Haderslev FK. In 2004 all the elite teams in football, ice hockey and handball merged into SønderjyskE, enabling the clubs to represent not only a city but the whole region of South Jutland (Sønderjylland), which drew more attention to the teams from sponsors, fans and media and made it easier to keep talents in South Jutland. From 2004 to 2006 the handball club TM Tønder also participated in the Southern Jutland club SønderjyskE Håndbold. When the men's team was moved to Sønderborg, TM Tønder decided to withdraw from the project as they deemed it too far from their base in Tønder/Møgeltønder.

As of 2009-07-01 4 of the 5 teams in the club play in the best Danish leagues: Men's football (Latest position: 6th), women's football (latest position: relegated to second-best league), women's handball (latest position: 12th) and the ice hockey team (latest position: 1st). The male handball team finished 1st in the second-best Danish league.

== See also ==
- SønderjyskE Fodbold
- SønderjyskE Ishockey
- SønderjyskE Herre Håndbold
- SønderjyskE Dame Håndbold
