= 2016–17 Metal Ligaen season =

2016–17 Metal Liagen season
- League: (Denmark) Metal Ligaen
- Sport: Ice Hockey
- Duration: 23 September 2016 – 16 April 2017
- Number of games: 225 (45 per team)
- Number of teams: 10
- TV partner(s): TV 2 Sport

Regular season
- Season champions: Aalborg Pirates
- Season MVP: Dale Mitchell (Odense Bulldogs)

Playoffs

Finals
- Champions: Esbjerg Energy
- Runners-up: Gentofte Stars

Metal Ligaen seasons
- ← 2015–16 2017–18 →

The 2016–17 Metal Ligaen season was the 60th season of ice hockey in Denmark. Ten teams participated in the league. Esbjerg Energy defended their 2016 Danish championship title by defeating Gentofte Stars four games to one in the finals. The regular season begun on 23 September 2016 and ended on 28 February 2017. The last final was played on 16 April 2017.

== Teams ==
Teams of the 2016–17 Metal Liagean season

Teams licensed to play in the Metal Ligaen 2016–17

| Team | Arena | Capacity |
|---|---|---|
| Aalborg Pirates | Gigantium Isarena | 5,000 |
| Esbjerg Energy | Granly Hockey Arena | 4,200 |
| Frederikshavn White Hawks | Scanel Hockey Arena | 4,000 |
| Gentofte Stars | Gentofte Skøjtehal | 1,160 |
| Herlev Eagles | DFDS Seaways Arena | 1,740 |
| Herning Blue Fox | KVIK Hockey Arena | 4,105 |
| Odense Bulldogs | Bryggeriet Vestfyens Arena | 3,280 |
| Rungsted Seier Capital | Saxo Bank Arena | 2,460 |
| Rødovre Mighty Bulls | Rødovre Skøjte Arena | 3,600 |
| SønderjyskE Ishockey | SE Arena | 5,000 |

Source: Eliteprospects.com

== Regular season ==
=== League table ===
| Pos | Team | Pld | W | OTW | OTL | L | GF | GA | GD | Pts | Qualification |
|---|---|---|---|---|---|---|---|---|---|---|---|
| 1 | Aalborg Pirates | 45 | 27 | 4 | 2 | 12 | 133 | 94 | +39 | 91 | Qualification to Metal Ligaen Play-offs |
| 2 | Odense Bulldogs | 45 | 22 | 9 | 4 | 10 | 143 | 96 | +47 | 88 | Qualification to Metal Ligaen Play-offs |
| 3 | Frederikshavn White Hawks | 45 | 23 | 7 | 1 | 14 | 133 | 92 | +41 | 84 | Qualification to Metal Ligaen Play-offs |
| 4 | Esbjerg Energy | 45 | 18 | 6 | 9 | 12 | 140 | 106 | +34 | 75 | Qualification to Metal Ligaen Play-offs |
| 5 | SønderjyskE | 45 | 20 | 5 | 5 | 15 | 130 | 117 | +13 | 75 | Qualification to Metal Ligaen Play-offs |
| 6 | Gentofte Stars | 45 | 19 | 6 | 4 | 16 | 100 | 95 | +5 | 73 | Qualification to Metal Ligaen Play-offs |
| 7 | Herning Blue Fox | 45 | 19 | 2 | 10 | 14 | 130 | 107 | +23 | 71 | Qualification to Metal Ligaen Play-offs |
| 8 | Rungsted Seier Capital | 45 | 19 | 2 | 6 | 18 | 141 | 131 | +10 | 67 | Qualification to Metal Ligaen Play-offs |
| 9 | Rødovre Mighty Bulls | 45 | 7 | 4 | 6 | 28 | 100 | 186 | −86 | 35 | |
| 10 | Herlev Eagles | 45 | 1 | 5 | 3 | 36 | 102 | 228 | −126 | 16 | |

Updated to match(es) played on 28 February 2017. Source: Metal Ligaen

== Play-offs ==
Quarterfinals
3 | Frederikshavn | 4
7 | Herning | 2
4 | Esbjerg | 4
5 | SønderjyskE | 2
2 | Odense | 4
8 | Rungsted | 0
1 | Aalborg | 3
6 | Gentofte | 4

Semifinals
3 | Frederikshavn | 3
4 | Esbjerg | 4
2 | Odense | 1
6 | Gentofte | 4

Finals
4 | Esbjerg | 4
6 | Gentofte | 1
Third place
2 | Odense | 2^{g}
3 | Frederikshavn | 9^{g}

g. The score for third place is goals, not games.

== TV coverage ==
TV 2 Sport got the rights of covering the 2016–17 season of Metal Ligaen.

=== Regular season ===
| No. | Date | Match | Result |
|---|---|---|---|
| 1 | 23/09 | Esbjerg–Frederikshavn | 1–3 |
| 2 | 30/09 | Rungsted–Rødovre | 7–1 |
| 3 | 04/10 | Frederikshavn–SønderjyskE | 2–1 |
| 4 | 07/10 | Rødovre–Herlev | 5–1 |
| 5 | 11/10 | Odense–Herning | 3–2 (SO) |
| 6 | 14/10 | Herlev–Aalborg | 4–5 |
| 7 | 18/10 | SønderjyskE–Herning | 3–4 |
| 8 | 25/10 | Frederikshavn–Aalborg | 2–5 |
| 9 | 08/11 | SønderjyskE–Esbjerg | 4–3 |
| 10 | 11/11 | Herning–Odense | 5–4 |
| 11 | 15/11 | Aalborg–Rungsted | 4–2 |
| 12 | 18/11 | Herning–Aalborg | 3–6 |
| 13 | 22/11 | Esbjerg–Rungsted | 4–3 (OT) |
| 14 | 29/11 | Gentofte–Herlev | 5–2 |
| 15 | 06/01 | Odense–Rungsted | 5–1 |
| 16 | 31/01 | Rungsted–Esbjerg | 4–5 (OT) |
| 17 | 03/02 | SønderjyskE–Aalborg | 4–1 |
| 18 | 14/02 | SønderjyskE–Odense | 2–4 |
| 19 | 17/02 | Frederikshavn–Rungsted | 4–3 (SO) |
| 20 | 21/02 | Herning–Gentofte | 1–0 |
| 21 | 24/02 | Aalborg–Esbjerg | 2–5 |
| 22 | 28/02 | Aalborg–Frederikshavn | 1–0 |

Source: Metal Ligaen

== Player statistics ==
=== Scoring leaders ===
The following players led the league in regular season points at the conclusion of games played on February 28, 2017.

| Player | Team | GP | G | A | Pts | +/– | PIM |
|---|---|---|---|---|---|---|---|
| (Canada) Dale Mitchell | Odense Bulldogs | 44 | 27 | 40 | 67 | +33 | 124 |
| (United States) Tony Romano | Odense Bulldogs | 42 | 28 | 26 | 54 | +36 | 47 |
| (Canada) Harrison Reed | SønderjyskE | 45 | 27 | 24 | 51 | +15 | 30 |
| (Canada) Peter Quenneville | Aalborg Pirates | 45 | 30 | 19 | 49 | +8 | 26 |
| (Canada) Brendan Connolly | Rungsted Seier Capital | 42 | 20 | 28 | 48 | +4 | 186 |
| (Canada) Brock Nixon | Esbjerg Energy | 45 | 20 | 27 | 47 | +28 | 24 |
| (Canada) Jamie Johnson | Herning Blue Fox | 45 | 14 | 33 | 47 | +20 | 50 |
| (United States) Derek Damon | SønderjyskE | 44 | 16 | 29 | 45 | +21 | 77 |
| (Canada) Ryan Martindale | Esbjerg Energy | 45 | 20 | 25 | 45 | +18 | 28 |
| (Sweden) Sebastian Strandberg | Odense Bulldogs | 40 | 13 | 32 | 45 | +22 | 16 |
