= 2005–06 Oddset Ligaen season =

Danish ice hockey league season

The 2005–06 Oddset Ligaen season was the 49th season of ice hockey in Denmark. Nine teams participated in the league, and SønderjyskE Ishockey won the championship.

== Regular season ==
	Club	GP	W	OTW	OTL	L	GF	GA	Pts
1.	AaB Ishockey	36	19	5	5	7	127	94	72
2.	Herning IK	36	21	1	3	11	129	91	68
3.	SønderjyskE Ishockey	36	19	5	1	11	113	90	68
4.	Nordsjælland Cobras	36	18	5	2	11	104	88	66
5.	Frederikshavn White Hawks	36	12	6	5	13	82	81	53
6.	Rødovre Mighty Bulls	36	15	1	4	16	92	94	51
7.	Odense Bulldogs	36	12	1	5	18	90	116	43
8.	EfB Ishockey	36	9	5	3	19	94	118	40
9.	Herlev Hornets	36	5	3	4	24	72	130	25

== Playoffs ==
Quarter-finals
AaB Ishockey	4
Rødovre Mighty Bulls	2
Nordsjælland Cobras	4
Frederikshavn White Hawks	3
Herning IK	4
Odense Bulldogs	1
SønderjyskE Ishockey	4
EfB Ishockey	1

Semi-finals
AaB Ishockey	4
Nordsjælland Cobras	1
Herning IK	3
SønderjyskE Ishockey	4

Final
AaB Ishockey	2
SønderjyskE Ishockey	4
Third place
Herning IK	2
Nordsjælland Cobras	1
