= 2006–07 Oddset Ligaen season =

The 2006–07 Oddset Ligaen season was the 50th season of ice hockey in Denmark. Nine teams participated in the league, and the Herning Blue Fox won the championship.

== Regular season ==
	Club	GP	W	OTW	OTL	L	GF	GA	Pts
1.	Herning Blue Fox	36	26	4	2	4	142	76	88
2.	Odense Bulldogs	36	19	2	6	9	137	113	67
3.	AaB Ishockey	36	21	1	1	13	117	90	66
4.	SønderjyskE Ishockey	36	16	5	0	15	125	113	58
5.	Rødovre Mighty Bulls	36	13	4	7	12	120	118	54
6.	EfB Ishockey	36	12	4	6	14	103	114	50
7.	Frederikshavn White Hawks	36	9	5	2	20	105	132	39
8.	Nordsjælland Cobras	36	8	5	4	19	106	131	38
9.	Herlev Hornets	36	4	4	6	22	107	175	26

== Playoffs ==
Quarter-finals
Herning Blue Fox	4
Nordsjælland Cobras	1
Odense Bulldogs	2
EfB Ishockey	4
AaB Ishockey	4
Frederikshavn White Hawks	1
SønderjyskE Ishockey	4
Rødovre Mighty Bulls	0

Semi-finals
Herning Blue Fox	4
EfB Ishockey	1
AaB Ishockey	4
SønderjyskE Ishockey	3

Final
Herning Blue Fox	4
AaB Ishockey	1
Third place
EfB Ishockey	0
SønderjyskE Ishockey	2
