= 2013–14 Metal Ligaen season =

2013–14 Metal Liagen season
- League: (Denmark) Metal Ligaen
- Sport: Ice hockey
- Duration: 19 September 2013 – 15 April 2014

Regular season
- League Champion: SønderjyskE Ishockey
- Top scorer: Alex Leavitt (Aalborg)

Playoffs

Finals
- Champions: SønderjyskE Ishockey
- Runners-up: Herning Blue Fox

Metal Ligaen seasons
- ← 2012–13 2014–15 →

The 2013–14 Metal Ligaen season was the 57th season of ice hockey in Denmark. Nine teams participated in the league. SønderjyskE Ishockey defended their 2013 Danish championship title by defeating Herning Blue Fox four games to three in the finals.

== Regular season ==
	Club	GP	W	OTW	OTL	L	GF	GA	Pts
1.	SønderjyskE Ishockey	40	28	3	1	8	159	85	91
2.	Herning Blue Fox	40	25	4	4	7	127	69	87
3.	Aalborg Pirates	40	23	2	3	12	150	109	76
4.	Frederikshavn White Hawks	40	19	5	5	11	135	117	72
5.	Esbjerg Energy	40	17	1	4	18	122	131	57
6.	Odense Bulldogs	40	14	1	3	22	100	122	47
7.	Rødovre Mighty Bulls	40	11	5	0	24	101	131	43
8.	Herlev Eagles	40	11	2	3	24	76	114	40
9.	Rungsted Ishockey	40	8	1	1	30	86	177	27

== Playoffs ==
Quarterfinals
1	SønderjyskE Ishockey	4
5	Esbjerg Energy	1
3	Aalborg Pirates	4
7	Rødovre Mighty Bulls	3
2	Herning Blue Fox	4
8	Herlev Eagles	0
4	Frederikshavn White Hawks	4
6	Odense Bulldogs	1

Semifinals
1	SønderjyskE Ishockey	4
3	Aalborg Pirates	0
2	Herning Blue Fox	4
4	Frederikshavn White Hawks	0

Final
1	SønderjyskE Ishockey	4
2	Herning Blue Fox	3
Third place
3	Aalborg Pirates	1
4	Frederikshavn White Hawks	2
