= 2014–15 Metal Ligaen season =

2014–15 Metal Liagen season
- League: (Denmark) Metal Ligaen
- Sport: Ice hockey
- Duration: 19 September 2014 – 12 April 2015

Regular season
- Season champions: Herning Blue Fox
- Top scorer: Andrew Clark (Esbjerg Energy)

Playoffs
- Playoffs MVP: Thomas Spelling (SønderjyskE)

Finals
- Champions: SønderjyskE
- Runners-up: Esbjerg Energy

Metal Ligaen seasons
- ← 2013–14 2015–16 →

The 2014–15 Metal Ligaen season is the 58th season of ice hockey in Denmark. Ten teams participated in the league. The regular season began on 19 September 2014 and ended on 22 February 2015. The league championship was won by SønderjyskE.

== Regular season ==
	Club	GP	W	OTW	OTL	L	GF	GA	Pts
1.	Herning	36	24	0	6	6	145	95	78
2.	SønderjyskE	36	21	2	5	8	133	90	72
3.	Frederikshavn	36	21	2	3	10	124	87	70
4.	Odense	36	17	6	1	12	118	97	64
5.	Esbjerg	36	15	6	2	13	146	125	59
6.	Rødovre	36	15	3	2	16	103	106	53
7.	Rungsted	36	14	2	1	19	110	130	47
8.	Aalborg	36	11	5	2	18	105	112	45
9.	Herlev	36	6	4	3	23	66	124	29
10.	Gentofte	36	5	1	6	24	83	167	23

== Playoffs ==
As of 27 March 2015.

Quarterfinals
1	Herning	4
7	Rungsted	3
4	Odense	0
5	Esbjerg	4
2	SønderjyskE	4
6	Rødovre	1
3	Frederikshavn	4
8	Aalborg	1

Semifinals
1	Herning	2
5	Esbjerg	4
2	SønderjyskE	4
3	Frederikshavn	1

Final
2	SønderjyskE	4
5	Esbjerg	1
Third place
1	Herning	1
3	Frederikshavn	2
