= 2007–08 AL-Bank Ligaen season =

The 2007–08 AL-Bank Ligaen season was the 51st season of ice hockey in Denmark. Ten teams participated in the league, and Herning IK won the championship.

== Regular season ==
| | Club | GP | W | OTW | OTL | L | GF | GA | Pts |
|---|---|---|---|---|---|---|---|---|---|
| 1. | Rødovre Mighty Bulls | 45 | 28 | 2 | 7 | 8 | 172 | 107 | 98 |
| 2. | Herning IK | 45 | 23 | 10 | 4 | 8 | 165 | 104 | 93 |
| 3. | AaB Ishockey | 45 | 24 | 8 | 2 | 11 | 157 | 121 | 90 |
| 4. | SønderjyskE Ishockey | 45 | 25 | 4 | 3 | 13 | 191 | 126 | 88 |
| 5. | Odense Bulldogs | 45 | 17 | 4 | 7 | 17 | 143 | 153 | 68 |
| 6. | Nordsjælland Cobras | 45 | 15 | 5 | 6 | 19 | 138 | 139 | 61 |
| 7. | Hvidovre Ishockey | 45 | 13 | 6 | 4 | 22 | 138 | 167 | 55 |
| 8. | Frederikshavn White Hawks | 45 | 13 | 6 | 3 | 23 | 134 | 158 | 54 |
| 9. | EfB Ishockey | 45 | 14 | 3 | 6 | 22 | 139 | 158 | 54 |
| 10. | Herlev Hornets | 45 | 4 | 1 | 7 | 33 | 93 | 237 | 20 |

== Playoffs ==
Quarter-finals
Herning IK | 4
Hvidovre Ishockey | 3
AaB Ishockey | 1
Odense Bulldogs | 4
SønderjyskE Ishockey | 4
Nordsjælland Cobras | 1
Rødovre Mighty Bulls | 3
Frederikshavn White Hawks | 4

Semi-finals
Herning IK | 4
Odense Bulldogs | 0
SønderjyskE Ishockey | 2
Frederikshavn White Hawks | 4

Final
Herning IK | 4
Frederikshavn White Hawks | 1
Third place
SønderjyskE Ishockey | 1
Odense Bulldogs | 1
