= 2015–16 Metal Ligaen season =

2015–16 Metal Liagen season
- League: (Denmark) Metal Ligaen
- Sport: Ice Hockey
- Duration: 18 September 2015 – April 2016
- Number of games: 225 (45 per team)
- Number of teams: 10
- TV partner(s): TV 2 Sport

Regular season
- Season champions: SønderjyskE Ishockey
- Top scorer: Dale Mitchell (77 points)

Playoffs

Finals
- Champions: Esbjerg Energy
- Runners-up: Herning Blue Fox

Metal Ligaen seasons
- ← 2014–15 2016–17 →

The 2015–16 Metal Ligaen season was the 59th season of ice hockey in Denmark. Ten teams participated in the league. Esbjerg Energy won championship by defeating Herning Blue Fox four games to two in the finals. The regular season begun on 18 September 2015 and ended on 29 February 2016.

== Teams ==
Teams of the 2015–16 Metal Liagean season

It was attended by teams of the previous year.

| Team | Arena | Capacity |
|---|---|---|
| Aalborg Pirates | Gigantium Isarena | 5.000 |
| Esbjerg Energy | Granly Hockey Arena | 4.200 |
| Frederikshavn White Hawks | Scanel Hockey Arena | 4.000 |
| Gentofte Stars | Gentofte Skøjtehal | 1.160 |
| Herlev Eagles | DFDS Seaways Arena | 1.740 |
| Herning Blue Fox | KVIK Hockey Arena | 4.105 |
| Odense Bulldogs | Bryggeriet Vestfyens Arena | 3.280 |
| Rungsted Seier Capital | Saxo Bank Arena | 2.460 |
| Rødovre Mighty Bulls | Rødovre Skøjte Arena | 3.600 |
| SønderjyskE Ishockey | SE Arena | 5.000 |

Source: Eliteprospects.com

== Regular season ==
| | Club | GP | W | OTW | OTL | L | GF | GA | Pts |
|---|---|---|---|---|---|---|---|---|---|
| 1. | SønderjyskE Ishockey | 45 | 25 | 7 | 4 | 9 | 147 | 89 | 93 |
| 2. | Frederikshavn White Hawks | 45 | 26 | 4 | 6 | 9 | 186 | 119 | 92 |
| 3. | Esbjerg Energy | 45 | 22 | 7 | 2 | 14 | 148 | 104 | 82 |
| 4. | Herning Blue Fox | 45 | 21 | 4 | 5 | 15 | 127 | 100 | 76 |
| 5. | Odense Bulldogs | 45 | 22 | 2 | 3 | 18 | 191 | 154 | 73 |
| 6. | Rungsted Seier Capital | 45 | 20 | 2 | 4 | 19 | 121 | 133 | 68 |
| 7. | Rødovre Mighty Bulls | 45 | 16 | 6 | 4 | 19 | 132 | 125 | 64 |
| 8. | Aalborg Pirates | 45 | 14 | 3 | 4 | 24 | 129 | 174 | 52 |
| 9. | Gentofte Stars | 45 | 13 | 2 | 4 | 26 | 103 | 166 | 47 |
| 10. | Herlev Eagles | 45 | 8 | 1 | 2 | 34 | 85 | 206 | 28 |

Updated to match(es) played on 29 February 2016. Source: Metal Ligaen

=== Results ===
| Home team | Away team | | | | | | | | | |
| Home team | Esbjerg | Fr.havn | Gentofte | Herlev | Herning | Odense | Rungsted | Rødovre | Sønderj. | Aalborg |
|---|---|---|---|---|---|---|---|---|---|---|
| Esbjerg Energy | – | 2-1 (SO); 4-3 (OT); 2-3 | 4-1; 4-3 | 8-0; 3-1 | 3-2 (SO); 3-4 (SO); 2-0 | 7-4; 9-0; 0-1 | 4-1; 2-5 | 6-3; 3-1 | 2-1 (SO); 0-2; 1-4 | 7-5; 4-5 |
| Frederikshavn White Hawks | 4-2; 4-3 (OT) | – | 1-2; 4-1 | 11-2; 5-4 (SO) | 4-2; 1-4 | 4-6; 6-2 | 5-2; 5-2; 3-4 | 3-2 (OT); 6-3; 5-3 | 3-4; 3-0; 1-3 | 3-1; 10-2; 3-2 (SO) |
| Gentofte Stars | 4-5 (SO); 2-3; 1-2 | 3-2 (OT); 0-5; 3-8 | – | 6-0; 5-1; 2-1 | 1-3; 2-6 | 3-5; 2-1; 6-3 | 4-5 (OT); 1-3 | 0-4; 3-1 | 1-2 (SO); 0-3 | 3-2; 1-2; 3-4 (SO) |
| Herlev Eagles | 0-1; 1-6; 0-3 | 1-6; 6-2; 2-6 | 3-5; 2-5 | – | 4-2; 3-4 | 3-5; 6-5; 1-11 | 0-5; 4-1; 1-7 | 4-5; 1-10 | 1-5; 0-3 | 3-2; 5-1; 2-6 |
| Herning Blue Fox | 2-4; 1-2 | 0-3; 2-1 (SO); 1-4 | 1-2; 5-2; 7-2 | 3-2; 5-2; 6-0 | – | 4-1; 2-3 (SO); 1-5 | 3-2; 3-1 | 5-2; 3-0 | 2-3 (SO); 2-3 (SO) | 2-1 (SO); 1-0 |
| Odense Bulldogs | 3-4 (OT); 9-3 | 3-6; 2-4; 2-6 | 7-2; 4-1 | 9-1; 2-4 | 2-5; 4-9 | – | 7-2; 5-4 (SO); 6-1 | 4-5 (SO); 3-2 | 2-4; 2-3 (OT); 3-6 | 5-2; 9-2; 13-0 |
| Rungsted Seier Capital | 2-1; 1-0; 2-5 | 3-5; 2-4 | 0-3; 3-2; 5-6 (OT) | 4-2; 5-0 | 5-2; 2-0; 3-1 | 2-1; 2-5 | – | 2-3 (SO); 2-1; 4-2 | 1-6; 2-1 (SO); 4-2 | 2-3 (OT); 3-4 |
| Rødovre Mighty Bulls | 5-3; 1-4; 0-6 | 5-4 (SO); 5-2 | 5-3; 4-1; 3-1 | 4-2; 2-1 (OT); 3-0 | 2-0; 1-2 (SO); 0-2 | 2-6; 2-3; 2-4 | 4-1; 5-2 | – | 2-3; 2-1 (SO) | 4-1; 4-2 |
| SønderjyskE Ishockey | 3-2; 3-1 | 4-3 (OT); 4-2 | 7-4; 3-1; 9-1 | 1-0; 2-3; 6-1 | 5-4 (OT); 1-2; 2-0 | 5-3; 2-4 | 0-3; 2-3 | 2-3 (OT); 1-0; 3-2 (OT) | – | 9-1; 1-2 |
| Aalborg Pirates | 6-1; 1-3; 1-2 (OT) | 4-6; 3-6 | 2-4; 5-2 | 6-2; 2-3 (SO) | 1-4; 4-2; 3-4 | 4-5; 3-2 | 4-2; 0-1; 6-3 | 2-6; 4-3; 5-4 (SO) | 3-5; 4-2; 3-6 | – |

Updated to match(es) played on 29 February 2016. Source: Metal Ligaen

== Playoffs ==
As of 19 April 2016.

Quarterfinals
1 | SønderjyskE Ishockey | 4
8 | Aalborg Pirates | 0
3 | Esbjerg Energy | 4
7 | Rødovre Mighty Bulls | 2
2 | Frederikshavn White Hawks | 4
6 | Rungsted Seier Capital | 0
4 | Herning Blue Fox | 4
5 | Odense Bulldogs | 3

Semifinals
1 | SønderjyskE Ishockey | 3
3 | Esbjerg Energy | 4
2 | Frederikshavn White Hawks | 3
4 | Herning Blue Fox | 4

Finals
3 | Esbjerg Energy | 4
4 | Herning Blue Fox | 2
Third place
1 | SønderjyskE Ishockey | 4^{g}
2 | Frederikshavn White Hawks | 5^{g}

g. The score for third place is goals, not games.

=== Quarterfinals ===
| | | | Series | 1 | 2 | 3 | 4 | 5 | 6 | 7 |
|---|---|---|---|---|---|---|---|---|---|---|
| SønderjyskE Ishockey | – | Aalborg Pirates | 4-0 | 3-0 | 2-1 | 9-3 | 0-2 | | | |
| Frederikshavn White Hawks | – | Rungsted Seier Capital | 4-0 | 2-1 | 5-1 | 4-2 | 5-1 | | | |
| Esbjerg Energy | – | Rødovre Mighty Bulls | 4-2 | 2-0 | 3-2 (OT) | 0-1 | 3-5 | 4-3 (OT) | 1-0 (OT) | |
| Herning Blue Fox | – | Odense Bulldogs | 4-3 | 2-1 | 0-3 | 6-1 | 1-2 | 1-2 (OT) | 2-1 | 2-1 (OT) |

=== Semifinals ===
| | | | Series | 1 | 2 | 3 | 4 | 5 | 6 | 7 |
|---|---|---|---|---|---|---|---|---|---|---|
| SønderjyskE Ishockey | – | Esbjerg Energy | 3-4 | 4-6 | 5-4 (OT) | 4-1 | 3-4 (OT) | 2-1 | 1-0 (OT) | 1-4 |
| Frederikshavn White Hawks | – | Herning Blue Fox | 3-4 | 3-1 | 1-7 | 5-2 | 2-5 | 5-3 | 0-2 | 1-3 |

=== Third Place ===
| | | | Overall | 1 | 2 |
|---|---|---|---|---|---|
| SønderjyskE Ishockey | – | Frederikshavn White Hawks | 4-5 | 3-2 | 1-3 |

=== Finals ===
| | | | Series | 1 | 2 | 3 | 4 | 5 | 6 | 7 |
|---|---|---|---|---|---|---|---|---|---|---|
| Esbjerg Energy | – | Herning Blue Fox | 4-2 | 3-2 | 1-2 | 0-5 | 4-5 | 2-0 | 3-2 (OT) | |

Updated to match(es) played on 19 April 2016. Source: Metal Ligaen
