= Copenhagen Hockey =

Hvidovre Fighters
- City: Hvidovre
- League: Metal Ligaen
- Founded: 1966
- Home arena: Hvidovre Skøjtehal (Capacity: 2000)
- Colors: White and Black
- Head coach: Peter Enehag

Franchise history
- 1966–2007: Hvidovre Ishockey
- 2007–2009: Totempo HvIK
- 2009–2011: Hvidovre Ligahockey
- 2011–2013: Copenhagen Hockey
- 2013–2014: Hvidovre IK
- 2014 – present: Hvidovre Fighters

Hvidovre Fighters/Copenhagen Hockey is a professional ice hockey team based in Hvidovre, Denmark. They play in the second-highest hockey league in Denmark, the 1.division. Founded in 1966, they have taken on many different names, starting with the founding name, Hvidovre Ishockey and now Hvidovre Fighters. The team was previously part of the top Danish hockey league, but due to its financial struggles, it has declared bankruptcy many times, resulting in its many change of names. The team currently plays out of the Hvidovre Skøjtehal arena.

== History ==
The team, formerly known as Hvidovre Wolves, first joined the league in the 2007–08 season. The name Totempo HvIK is the result of a sponsorship deal. On 29 January 2009, the club withdrew from the Danish Elitserien and filed for bankruptcy on Monday after their two main sponsors pulled out on them. One, car service company Totempo, filed for bankruptcy and the second, office machine company NRG Scandinavia, disputed their sponsorship agreement, saying it was entered into by a sales and marketing manager at NRG who didn't have the authority and was since fired. As a result, the club was short 2 million Danish crowns (about $428,000 Canadian) in revenue.

After withdrawing from the top Danish hockey league, Hvidovre played one year in the 1.division as Hvidovre IK. In 2014 they changed their name to Hvidovre Fighters, signaling a new beginning and vision for Hvidovre IK. Part of this vision was to change the organisation and rebuild the club, to one day return to the highest league level.

in their second season as Hvidovre Fighters the team accomplished their goal of a being a top 4 team, by advancing all the way to the finals, settling for a silver medal, after losing to Vojens IK. With the future goal of returning to the highest league, the Hvidovre Fighters decided to stay another year in the 1.division, continuing to build up their team and organisation.

In 2017 Hvidore Fighters achieved their dream by winning the 1.division and returning to the top league in Danish hockey.
