= 2008–09 AL-Bank Ligaen season =

The 2008–09 AL-Bank Ligaen season was the 52nd season of ice hockey in Denmark. Ten teams participated in the league, and SønderjyskE Ishockey won the championship.

== First round ==
	Club	GP	W	OTW	OTL	L	GF	GA	Pts
1.	Herning IK	36	23	3	2	8	139	74	77
2.	Rødovre Mighty Bulls	36	20	5	4	7	128	77	74
3.	Odense Bulldogs	36	18	4	3	11	123	117	65
4.	SønderjyskE Ishockey	36	18	4	1	13	122	95	63
5.	Nordsjælland Cobras	36	15	7	4	10	114	112	63
6.	Totempo HvIK	36	13	1	5	17	105	116	46
7.	EfB Ishockey	36	13	2	3	18	111	141	46
8.	AaB Ishockey	36	11	4	3	18	109	117	44
9.	Frederikshavn White Hawks	36	10	2	4	19	101	114	41
10.	Herlev Hornets	36	5	1	4	26	72	161	21

== Second round ==
=== Group A ===
	Club	GP	W	OTW	OTL	L	GF	GA	Pts
1.	Herning IK	8	6	0	0	2	39	21	57
2.	Rødovre Mighty Bulls	8	4	0	1	3	20	22	50
3.	Odense Bulldogs	8	4	0	0	4	25	25	45
4.	SønderjyskE Ishockey	8	3	1	0	4	25	22	43
5.	Nordsjælland Cobras	8	2	0	0	6	19	38	38

=== Group B ===
	Club	GP	W	OTW	OTL	L	GF	GA	Pts
6.	EfB Ishockey	9	4	2	0	3	29	20	39
7.	Frederikshavn White Hawks	9	5	1	0	3	32	23	38
8.	AaB Ishockey	9	4	0	4	1	25	22	38
9.	Herlev Hornets	9	1	1	0	7	17	37	16

== Playoffs ==
Quarter-finals
Herning IK	4
AaB Ishockey	1
Odense Bulldogs	4
Nordsjælland Cobras	0
Rødovre Mighty Bulls	4
Frederikshavn White Hawks	3
SønderjyskE Ishockey	4
EfB Ishockey	0

Semi-finals
Herning IK	4
Odense Bulldogs	1
Rødovre Mighty Bulls	2
SønderjyskE Ishockey	4

Final
Herning IK	2
SønderjyskE Ishockey	4
Third place
Odense Bulldogs	0
Rødovre Mighty Bulls	2
