= SønderjyskE Ishockey =

- City: Vojens, Denmark
- League: Metal Ligaen
- Founded: 1 January 2004
- Home arena: Frøs Arena cap. 5,000 (2,000 seats)
- Colours: Light blue, dark blue, white
- General manager: Kim Lykkeskov
- Head coach: Anders Førster
- Captain: David Madsen
- Website: www.soenderjyske.dk
Home colours	Away colours

Franchise history
- 1963–1997: Vojens Ishockey Klub
- 1997–2003: Vojens Lions
- 2003–2004: IK Sønderjylland
- 2004–present: SønderjyskE Ishockey

SønderjyskE Ishockey is a professional ice hockey team playing in the top Danish ice hockey league Metal Ligaen. The team is part of SønderjyskE which is a sports umbrella with football, handball and ice hockey teams. The team plays home games in Vojens, a small town in the southernmost part of Jutland. SønderjyskE is the only team in Denmark which home arena has a narrow sized rink (common in North America and the NHL), whereas all other rinks in the country are standard IIHF sized rinks. Most of the club's foreign players are also originating from North America.

== History ==
Vojens Ishockey Klub (VIK) was founded 5 January 1963 by Jens Peder Hansen on Fuglesøen, at that time an icy lake in Vojens. In 25 years Jens Peder Hansen ran the club as chairman. In the early years he was goalie and later coach for the elite team.

In 1965 the club was promoted to the top league in Denmark - 1. Division. In 1973 the club started to play indoor in the new Vojens Skøjtehal. After winning 3 championships with key players as Egon Kahl, Steen Schou, and George Galbraith, the club began to struggle in the 1980s and was relegated in 1987. Promotion in 1989 was followed by relegation the next year, but since 1992 the club has played in the top league in Denmark. Since 2004 as part of the SønderjyskE organisation.

SønderjyskE as an organisation was formed in 2004, enabling the clubs to represent not only a city but the whole region of South Jutland (Sønderjylland), which drew more attention to the teams from sponsors, fans and media and made it easier to keep talents in South Jutland. In the 2003-04 season the hockey club was named IK Sønderjylland, from 1997 to 2003 Vojens Lions and prior to this Vojens Ishockey Klub (founded 1963). VIK still is the owner of the league license and runs the amateur teams in the club. In January 2011 the team moved to the new Syd Energi Arena (5,000 spectators, in 2018 named Frøs Arena) that is built in connection to their secondary arena Vojens Skøjtehal (2,300).

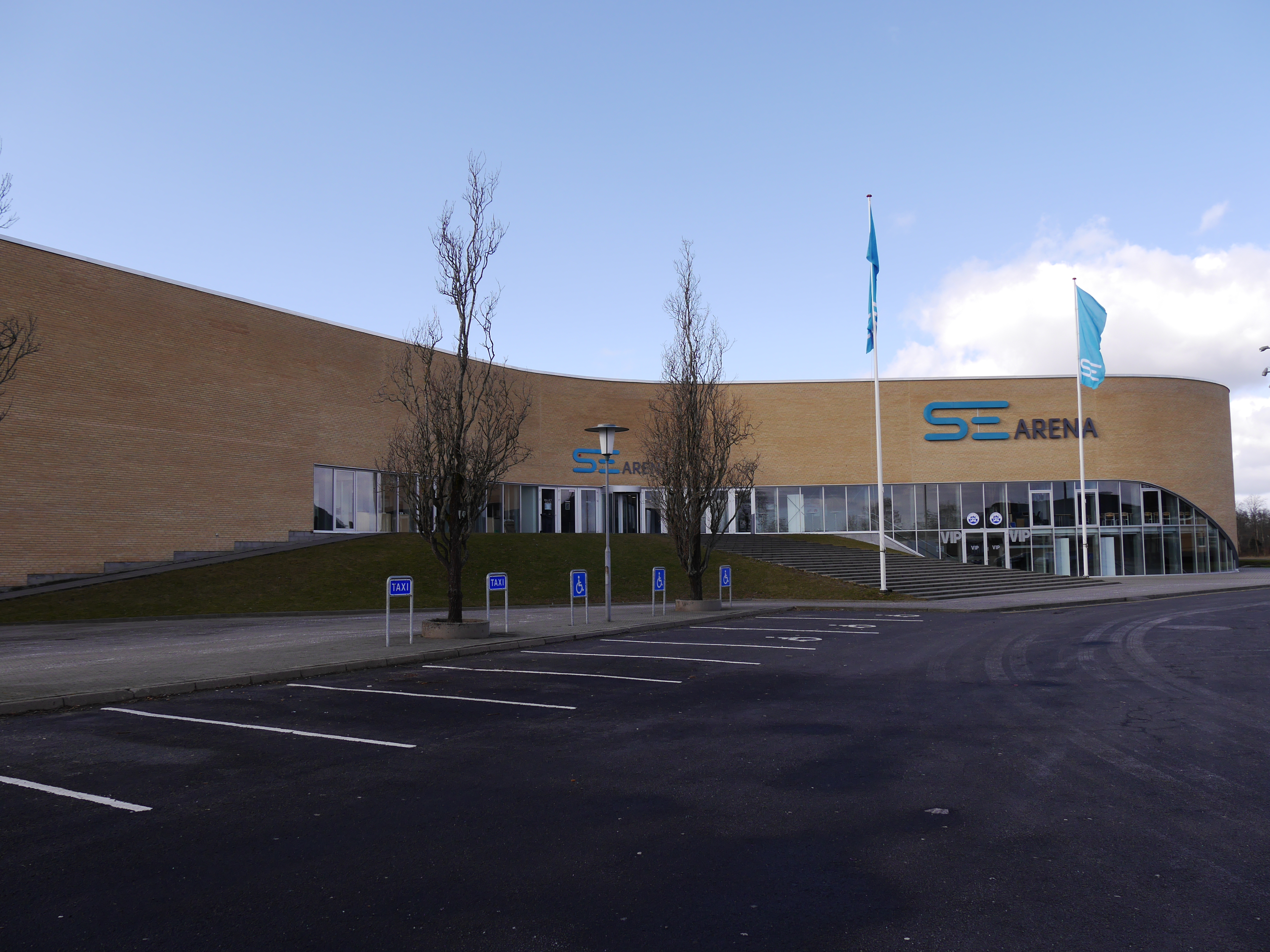
Home ice of the SønderjyskE ice hockey team

The top goalscorer and point leader in the club is Egon Kahl (373 goals and 309 assist (682 points) in 470 games). Kim Lykkeskov is the record holder for most games played (811 games). Former goalie Alfie Michaud has picked up several club records and in 2010 a Danish league record for time played without goals against. From 28/09/10-02/11/10 Alfie Michaud managed to play 360 minutes and 58 seconds without any goals against.

=== Achievements ===
Danish Championship
Gold (10 titles): 1978-79, 1979-80, 1981-82, 2005-06, 2008-09, 2009-10, 2012-13, 2013-14, 2014-15, 2023–24
Silver: (1 placing) 2018-19
Bronze: (7 placings) 1968-69, 1970-71, 1977-78, 2006-07, 2007-08, 2010-11, 2011-12

Danish Cup
Winners (5 titles): 2009-10, 2010–11, 2012-13, 2020-21, 2023–24
Runner-up (2 placings): 1998-99, 2013-14, 2014–15

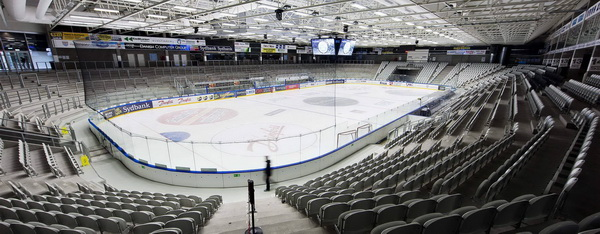
Inside Frøs Arena

Continental Cup
Gold (1 title): 2019-20
Bronze (1 placing): 2010-11

Champions Hockey League
Group Phase (2 placings): 2014-15, 2015-16

== Players ==
=== Current roster ===
Updated 7 October 2024.

No.	Nat	Player	Pos	S/G	Age	Acquired	Birthplace
91	(Denmark)	Valdemar Ahlberg	C	L	27	2022	Copenhagen, Denmark
61	(Denmark)	Anders Biel	C	L	24	2018	Fredericia, Denmark
17	(Denmark)	Jonas Borring	F	L	22	2021	Vojens, Denmark
27	(Denmark)	Mathias Borring	F	L	24	2018	Vojens, Denmark
25	(Denmark)	William Boysen	RW	R	28	2020	Rungsted, Denmark
14	(Canada)	Gabriel Desjardins (A)	LW	L	33	2022	Longueuil, Quebec, Canada
92	(Denmark)	Søren Dietz-Larsen	D	R	26	2024	Vojens, Denmark
42	(Sweden)	Oskar Drugge	D	R	33	2023	Luleå, Sweden
66	(Sweden)	Joseph Jonsson	C	L	28	2024	Landsbro, Sweden
3	(Denmark)	Mathias Kløve	C	L	20	2022	Haderslev, Denmark
11	(Denmark)	Nikolaj Krag	F	L	27	2022	Rødovre, Denmark
18	(Denmark)	Daniel Kønig	D	L	31	2011	Vojens, Denmark
7	(Denmark)	Rasmus Lyø (A)	D	L	31	2018	Odense, Denmark
82	(Denmark)	David Madsen (C)	C	R	27	2023	Vojens, Denmark
48	(Sweden)	Gustav Nielsen	D	L	26	2023	Hudiksvall, Sweden
86	(Denmark)	Oliver Nielsen	D	L	19	2024	Haderslev, Denmark
15	(Canada)	Jacob Panetta	D	L	30	2024	Belleville, Ontario, Canada
75	(Canada)	William Pelletier	C	R	33	2023	Lévis, Quebec, Canada
33	(Sweden)	Mattias Pettersson	G	L	34	2023	Halmstad, Sweden
39	(Denmark)	Jacob Schmidt-Svejstrup	RW	R	28	2023	Charlottenlund, Denmark
88	(Denmark)	Oscar Schulze	D	L	25	2023	Rungsted, Denmark
1	(Denmark)	Tobias Vilykke	G	L	20	2023	Kastrup, Denmark
29	(Sweden)	Alexander Wiklund	LW	L	35	2024	Piteå, Sweden

=== Notable former players ===
- (Canada) Daryl Andrews
- (United States) Chris Bartolone
- (Canada) Eric Bertrand
- (Canada) Dan Ceman
- (Denmark) Bo Dietz-Larsen
- (Denmark) Ole Eriksen
- (Canada) Dean Fedorchuk
- (Denmark) Kim Foder
- (Denmark) George Galbraith
- (Denmark) Patrick Galbraith
- (Denmark) Børge Gerber
- (Denmark) Søren Gerber
- (Canada) Brian Greer
- (Slovakia) Dusan Gregor
- (Canada) Ian Hebert
- (Czech Republic) Libor Herold
- (Denmark) Jan Jensen
- (Denmark) Egon Kahl
- (Sweden) Magnus Lindqvist
- (Denmark) Hans Lundgaard
- (Denmark) Kim Lykkeskov
- (Denmark) Bent Madsen
- (Canada) Alfie Michaud
- (Denmark) Karsten Mikkelsen
- (Denmark) Frank Møller
- (Denmark) Søren "Tiffi" Nielsen
- (Sweden) Stefan Nyman
- (Canada) Todd Reirden
- (Canada) James Richmond
- (Canada) Brad Rooney
- (Denmark) Steen Schou
- (Latvia) Aleksandrs Semjonovs
- (Canada) Mario Simioni
- (Canada) Todd Sparks
- (Canada) Pierre St. Onge
- (Denmark) Torben Uldall
- (Sweden) Jonas Vesterlund
