= 2011–12 AL-Bank Ligaen season =

The 2011–12 AL-Bank Ligaen season was the 55th season of ice hockey in Denmark. Nine teams participated in the league, and the Herning Blue Fox won the championship by defeating the Odense Bulldogs in the final.

== Regular season ==
	Club	GP	W	OTW	OTL	L	GF	GA	Pts
1.	SønderjyskE Ishockey	40	28	3	2	7	147	73	92
2.	Odense Bulldogs	40	23	4	1	12	127	109	78
3.	Herning Blue Fox	40	23	2	1	14	134	95	74
4.	Rødovre Mighty Bulls	40	18	6	1	15	119	109	67
5.	AaB Ishockey	40	17	3	4	16	122	116	61
6.	Herlev Eagles	40	11	6	4	19	103	121	49
7.	Frederikshavn White Hawks	40	11	3	7	19	97	128	46
8.	EfB Ishockey	40	12	3	3	22	108	140	45
9.	Copenhagen Hockey	40	5	2	9	24	92	158	28

== Playoffs ==
Quarterfinals
1	SønderjyskE Ishockey	4
6	Herlev Eagles	0
3	Herning Blue Fox	4
8	EfB Ishockey	1
2	Odense Bulldogs	4
7	Frederikshavn White Hawks	0
4	Rødovre Mighty Bulls	3
5	AaB Ishockey	4

Semifinals
1	SønderjyskE Ishockey	1
3	Herning Blue Fox	4
2	Odense Bulldogs	4
5	AaB Ishockey	0

Final
2	Odense Bulldogs	3
3	Herning Blue Fox	4
Third place
1	SønderjyskE Ishockey	2
5	AaB Ishockey	0
