= 2012–13 AL-Bank Ligaen season =

The 2012–13 AL-Bank Ligaen season was the 56th season of ice hockey in Denmark. Nine teams participated in the league, and SønderjyskE Ishockey won the championship.

== Regular season ==
	Club	GP	W	OTW	OTL	L	GF	GA	Pts
1.	Herning Blue Fox	40	24	4	4	8	123	69	84
2.	Frederikshavn White Hawks	40	24	3	6	7	127	78	84
3.	AaB Ishockey	40	23	4	3	10	135	102	80
4.	SønderjyskE Ishockey	40	22	3	2	13	138	79	74
5.	Odense Bulldogs	40	17	4	2	17	114	113	61
6.	EfB Ishockey	40	14	5	4	17	115	125	56
7.	Rødovre Mighty Bulls	40	11	5	3	21	97	121	46
8.	Herlev Eagles	40	11	4	4	21	91	128	45
9.	Copenhagen Hockey	40	1	1	5	33	68	193	10

== Playoffs ==
Quarterfinals
1	Herning Blue Fox	2
7	Rødovre Mighty Bulls	4
2	Frederikshavn White Hawks	4
8	Herlev Eagles	0
3	AaB Ishockey	3
5	Odense Bulldogs	4
4	SønderjyskE Ishockey	4
6	EfB Ishockey	2

Semifinals
2	Frederikshavn White Hawks	4
7	Rødovre Mighty Bulls	1
4	SønderjyskE Ishockey	4
5	Odense Bulldogs	1

Final
2	Frederikshavn White Hawks	3
4	SønderjyskE Ishockey	4
Third place
5	Odense Bulldogs	4
7	Rødovre Mighty Bulls	5
