= 2010–11 AL-Bank Ligaen season =

The 2010–11 AL-Bank Ligaen season was the 54th season of ice hockey in Denmark. Eight teams participated in the league, and the Herning Blue Fox won the championship.

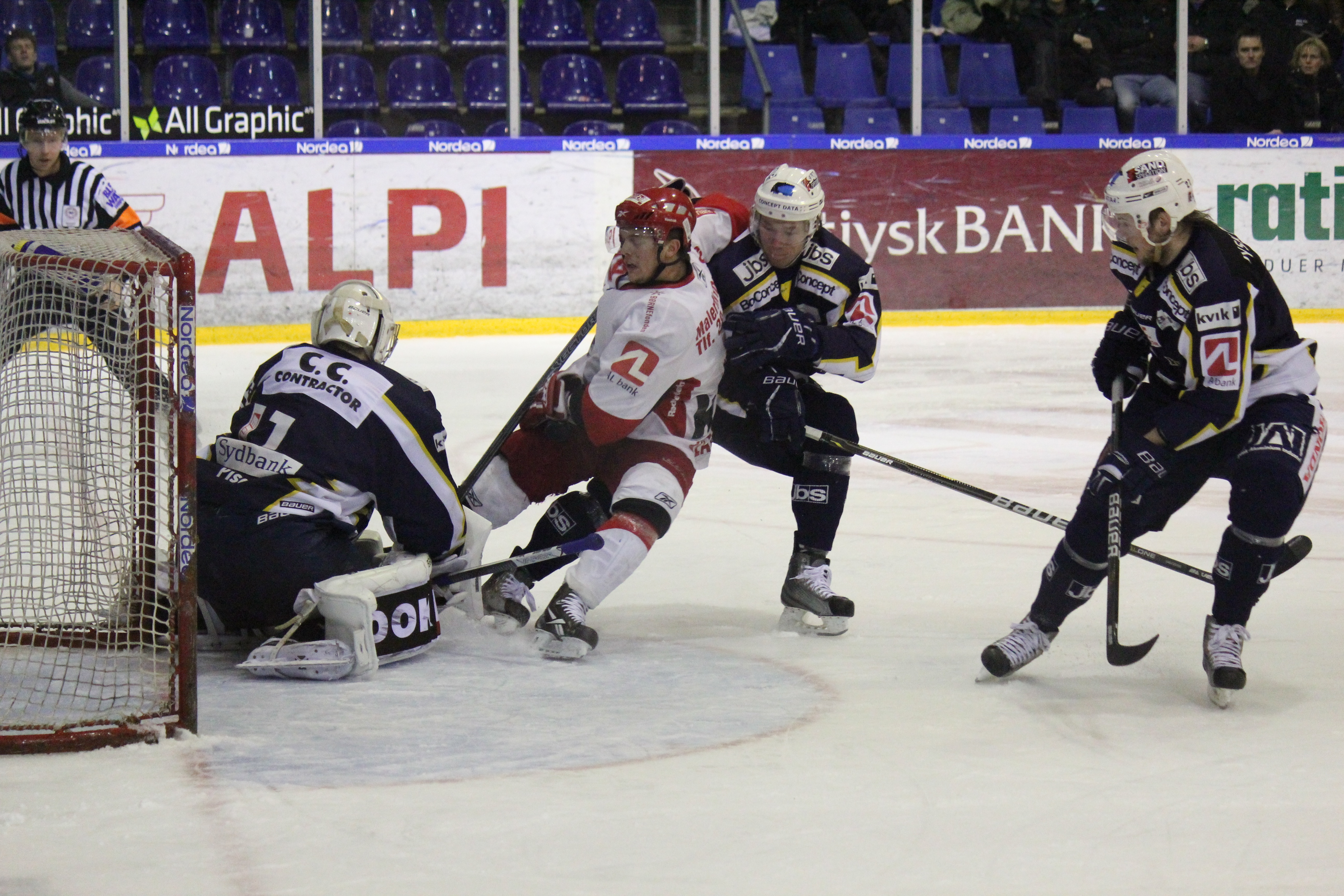

== First round ==
| Place | Team | GP | W | T | L | OTW | OTL | GF–GA | +/- | Pts |
|---|---|---|---|---|---|---|---|---|---|---|
| 1. | SønderjyskE Ishockey | 39 | 28 | 0 | 5 | 3 | 3 | 142-59 | 83 | 93 |
| 2. | Herning Blue Fox | 39 | 27 | 0 | 7 | 3 | 2 | 154-82 | 72 | 89 |
| 3. | Frederikshavn White Hawks | 39 | 18 | 0 | 13 | 4 | 4 | 129-111 | 18 | 66 |
| 4. | AaB Ishockey | 39 | 14 | 0 | 19 | 4 | 2 | 112-119 | -7 | 52 |
| 5. | Totempo HvIK | 39 | 14 | 0 | 17 | 2 | 6 | 101-117 | -16 | 52 |
| 6. | Rødovre Mighty Bulls | 39 | 11 | 0 | 21 | 4 | 3 | 86-131 | -45 | 44 |
| 7. | EfB Ishockey | 39 | 10 | 0 | 23 | 3 | 3 | 96-141 | -45 | 39 |
| 8. | Odense Bulldogs | 39 | 8 | 0 | 25 | 3 | 3 | 86-146 | -60 | 33 |

== Second round ==
=== Group A ===
| Place | Team | GP | W | T | L | OTW | OTL | GF–GA | +/- | Pts |
|---|---|---|---|---|---|---|---|---|---|---|
| 1. | SønderjyskE Ishockey | 4 | 3 | 0 | 1 | 0 | 0 | 12-10 | 2 | 12 |
| 2. | Rødovre Mighty Bulls | 4 | 2 | 0 | 2 | 0 | 0 | 12-11 | 1 | 6 |
| 3. | AaB Ishockey | 4 | 1 | 0 | 3 | 0 | 0 | 9-12 | -3 | 4 |

=== Group B ===
| Place | Team | GP | W | T | L | OTW | OTL | GF–GA | +/- | Pts |
|---|---|---|---|---|---|---|---|---|---|---|
| 1. | Herning Blue Fox | 4 | 4 | 0 | 0 | 0 | 0 | 22-8 | 14 | 15 |
| 2. | Frederikshavn White Hawks | 4 | 2 | 0 | 2 | 0 | 0 | 16-20 | -4 | 7 |
| 3. | Totempo HvIK | 4 | 0 | 0 | 4 | 0 | 0 | 8-18 | -10 | 0 |

== Playoffs ==
=== Semifinals ===
- SønderjyskE Ishockey - Frederikshavn White Hawks 2:4 (1:2, 4:1, 0:2, 2:1, 1:3, 0:3)
- Herning Blue Fox - Rødovre Mighty Bulls 4:1 (3:4, 5:1, 4:0, 1:0, 4:0)

=== 3rd place ===
- SønderjyskE Ishockey - Rødovre Mighty Bulls 2:2, 2:0

=== Final ===
- Herning Blue Fox - Frederikshavn White Hawks 4:1 (1:2, 4:3, 3:0, 5:3, 4:3)
