= 2009–10 AL-Bank Ligaen season =

The 2009–10 AL-Bank Ligaen season was the 53rd season of ice hockey in Denmark. Nine teams participated in the league, and SønderjyskE Ishockey won the championship.

== Regular season ==
	Club	GP	W	OTW	OTL	L	Pts	%	GF	GA
1.	SønderjyskE Ishockey	36	26	3	4	3	88	81	139	57
2.	AaB Ishockey	36	22	3	2	9	74	68	125	94
3.	Frederikshavn White Hawks	36	16	4	0	16	56	51	94	88
4.	EfB Ishockey	36	12	4	9	11	53	49	89	82
5.	Herning Blue Fox	36	15	2	4	15	53	49	92	101
6.	Rødovre Mighty Bulls	36	13	5	4	14	53	49	113	105
7.	Nordsjælland Cobras	36	11	3	1	21	40	37	92	122
8.	Hvidovre Ligahockey	36	9	3	3	21	36	33	80	126
9.	Odense Bulldogs	36	7	4	4	21	33	30	82	131

== Playoffs ==
Quarterfinals
1	SønderjyskE Ishockey	4
7	Nordsjælland Cobras	1
3	Frederikshavn White Hawks	4
6	Rødovre Mighty Bulls	3
2	AaB Ishockey	4
8	Hvidovre Ligahockey	1
4	EfB Ishockey	1
5	Herning Blue Fox	4

Semifinals
1	SønderjyskE Ishockey	4
3	Frederikshavn White Hawks	0
2	AaB Ishockey	4
5	Herning Blue Fox	1

Final
1	SønderjyskE Ishockey	4
2	AaB Ishockey	0
Third place
3	Frederikshavn White Hawks	0
5	Herning Blue Fox	2
