= Frederikshavn White Hawks =

Danish professional ice hockey team

- City: Frederikshavn, Denmark
- League: Metal Ligaen
- Founded: 1964
- Home arena: Scanel Hockey Arena
- Colours: White, blue
- Head coach: Fredrik Johansson

The Frederikshavn White Hawks are a Danish professional ice hockey team. As of 2025, they play in the top Danish ice hockey league, the Superisligaen (known as the Metal Ligaen for sponsorship reasons). The team is based in the town of Frederikshavn on the east coast of Northern Jutland, Denmark, and is run by the Frederikshavn Ishockey Klub (F.I.K).

== History ==
The White Hawks were founded in 1964 and have won the Danish title twice (1989, 2000) and have been runners-up three times (2008, 2011, 2013).

== Seasons ==
2007/08

In 2008 they progressed to the final after finishing the regular season seeded 8th (the first team in Danish league history to do so) knocking top seed Rødovre out in the first best of 7 series in the 7th game by scoring two late goals to win by 1. They beat SønderjyskE in the semifinal series, but lost the final in five games to the then reigning champions Herning.

2008/09

2009 saw them seeded 7th. If not for the bankruptcy of Hvidovre they would have finished 8th and probably faced Herning and forced their local rivals AaB out of the finals by 1 goal differential. However Hvildovre's bankruptcy left an open slot for AaB and put the White Hawks up a place to face Rødovre (second seed) again in the quarterfinals. This was also a very close series with the White Hawks winning three games over the much favored Rødovre, and pushing them to game 7 again. Rødovre won game 7 fairly easily, but the decisive moment was really Rødovre's overtime win in game 4, without which the White Hawks would have progressed after winning game 6. Rødovre went on to lose the semifinals to SønderjyskE who beat Herning in the finals.

2009/10

The 09/10 season was a Jekyll and Hyde one for The White Hawks, they were virtually unbeatable at home yet struggled to take points away. Despite this they finished the regular season in a very impressive 3rd behind the 2 favorites SønderjyskE & AaB. 3rd giving them home advantage in the quarterfinals they choose to play Rødovre again for the 3rd straight year. Some experts doubted they could progress saying "The White Hawks can't win away so all Rødovre needs to do is win 1 game away and they will win the series". This series would turn out to be another classic, Rødovre won the first 2 games despite the White Hawks dominating the first, the 3rd game saw an impressive come from behind win by The White Hawks. The series was really decided with the White Hawks away win in the 4th game, a game that saw a goal scored by White Hawks goalkeeper Frederik Andersen. Andersen had tried to score in game 3 after Rødovre pulled their keeper but just missed, in game 4 he made sure of his aim and scored in the empty net. The White Hawks went on to win a close game 5 and then game 7 easily. They were then put out in the semifinals after just 4 games by a dominant SønderjyskE who progressed to easily beat AaB in the finals in only 4 games to claim another championship. The White Hawks lost the bronze playoff to Herning and finished 2009/10 in 4th.

== Notable players ==
- (Denmark) Mike Grey (Retired 2012 to become assistant Coach - played 864 Games for the club)
- (Finland) Tomi Jokinen (Retired 2012 holds record for most games played in Danish League by a non-Dane)
- (Denmark) Frederik Andersen (First Danish goaltender to play in the NHL)
- (Russia) Ilya Dubkov
