= 2010 IIHF World Championship rosters =

Hockey rosters

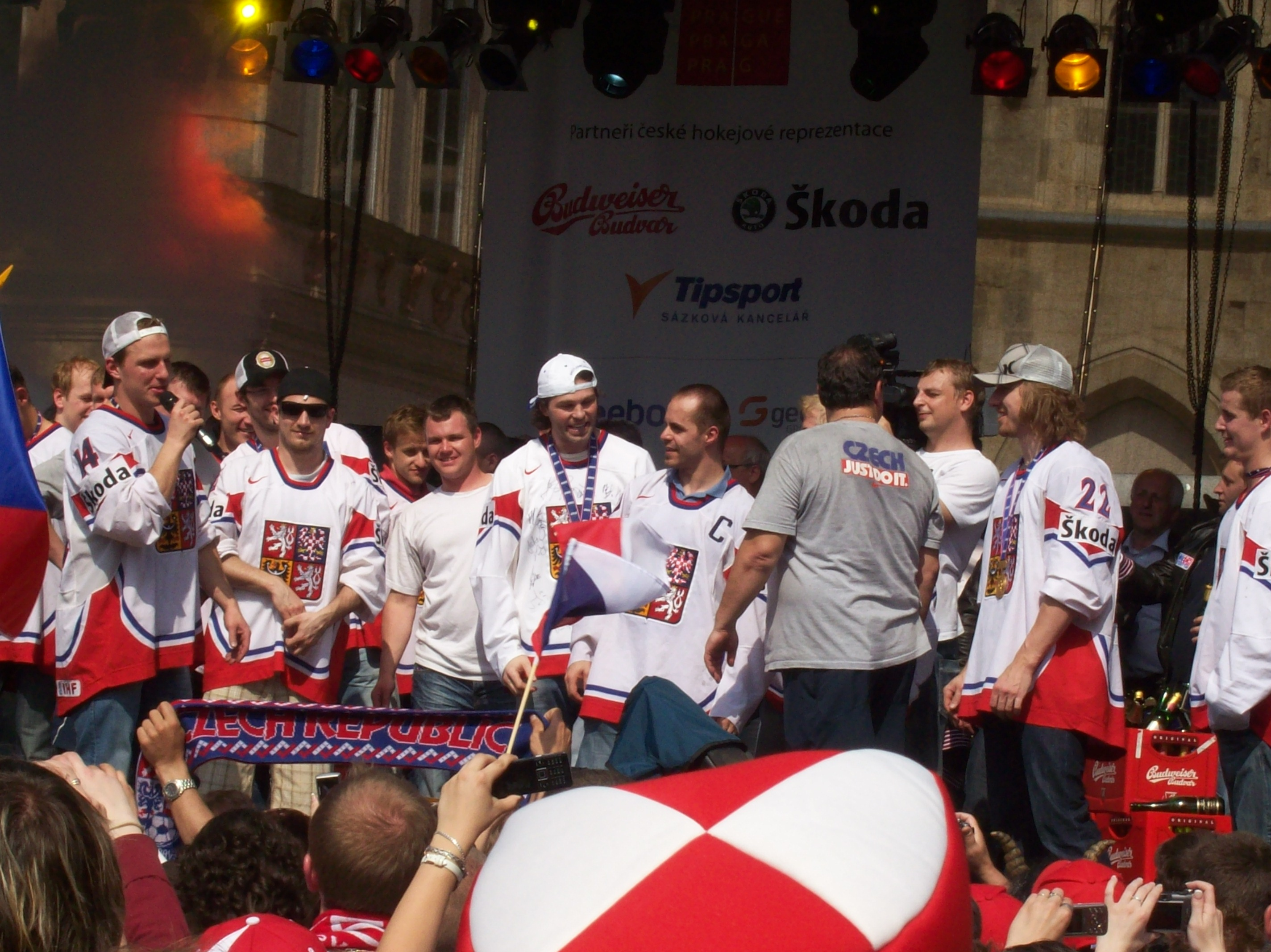
Arrival of the winning Czech team in Old Town Square, Prague, for celebrations.

The 2010 IIHF World Championship rosters consisted of 395 players from 16 national ice hockey teams. Run by the International Ice Hockey Federation (IIHF), the 2010 IIHF World Championship, held in Cologne, Gelsenkirchen and Mannheim, Germany, was the 74th edition of the tournament. The Czech Republic won the championship for the sixth time after defeating Russia 2–1 in the final.

Before the start of the championship, each participating nation had to submit a list of players for its roster. A minimum of fifteen skaters and two goaltenders and a maximum of twenty skaters and three goaltenders had to be selected. A country that had selected fewer than the maximum allowed were required to choose the remaining players prior to the start of the tournament. After the start of the tournament, each team was allowed to add an additional two players to their roster, for a maximum of 25. Once players were registered to the team, they could not be removed from the roster.

To have qualified for the national team under IIHF rules, a player must have met several criteria. He must be a citizen of the nation, and be under the jurisdiction of that national association. Players are allowed to switch which national team they play for, providing they fulfill the IIHF criteria. If participating for the first time in an IIHF event, the player was required to have played two consecutive years in the national competition of the new country without playing in another country. If the player has already played for a national team before, he may switch countries if he is a citizen of the new country, and has played for four consecutive years in the national competition of the new country. This switch may happen only once in the player's life.

Dennis Endras of Germany led the tournament in goaltending with a save percentage of 0.961, and was named the tournament's most valuable player and top goaltender by the IIHF directorate. Russian Pavel Datsyuk was named top forward and Petteri Nummelin of Finland was selected as top defenceman. Russia's Ilya Kovalchuk was the tournament's leading scorer with 12 points.

== Legend ==
Number	Uniform number	GP	Games played	W	Wins
F	Forward	G	Goals	L	Losses
D	Defenceman	A	Assists	Min	Minutes played
GK	Goaltender	Pts	Points	GA	Goals against
Club	Player's club before tournament	PIM	Penalties in minutes	GAA	Goals against average
		SO	Shutouts	SV%	Save percentage

== Belarus ==
- Head coach: Eduard Zankovets (BLR)

=== Skaters ===
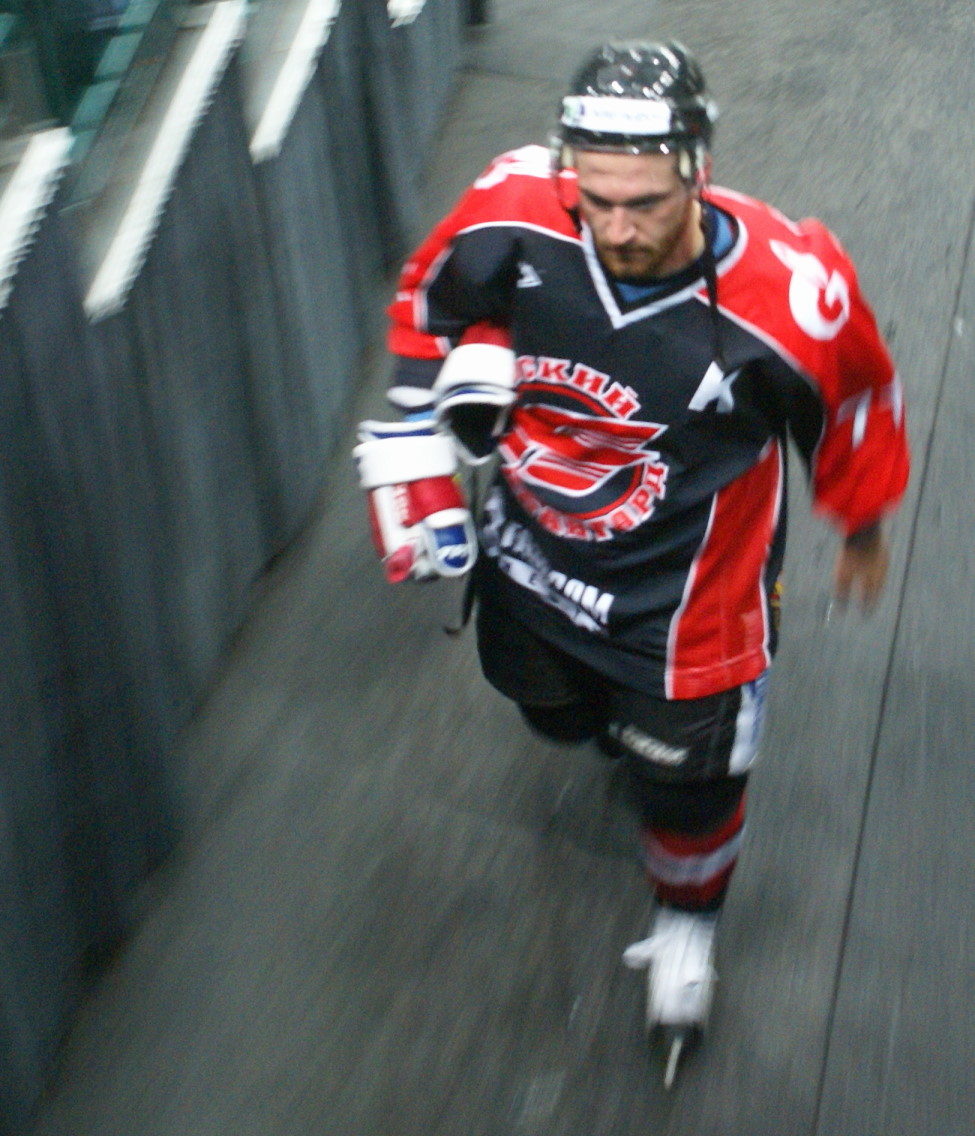
Alexei Kalyuzhny recorded four goals and two assists, finishing first in team scoring.

Number	Position	Player	Club	GP	G	A	Pts	PIM
68	F	Yaroslav Chupris	Dinamo Minsk	6	0	1	1	2
59	F	Sergei Demagin	Neftekhimik Nizhnekamsk	6	2	0	2	0
7	D	Vladimir Denisov	Dinamo Minsk	6	0	1	1	2
13	F	Sergei Drozd	Tri-City Americans	3	0	0	0	0
91	D	Kirill Gotovets	Shattuck St. Mary	3	0	0	0	2
84	F	Mikhail Grabovski	Toronto Maple Leafs	6	0	3	3	6
71	F	Alexei Kalyuzhny	Dynamo Moscow	6	4	2	6	4
25	D	Sergei Kolosov	Grand Rapids Griffins	6	0	0	0	2
43	D	Viktor Kostyuchenok	Spartak Moscow	6	0	1	1	0
88	F	Evgeni Kovyrshin	Dinamo Minsk	6	0	2	2	0
11	F	Alexander Kulakov	Dinamo Minsk	6	0	0	0	0
4	D	Alexander Makritski	Dinamo Minsk	4	0	1	1	2
19	F	Dmitri Meleshko	Dinamo Minsk	6	1	3	4	0
8	F	Andrei Mikhalev	Dinamo Minsk	6	1	0	1	2
52	D	Alexander Ryadinsky	Yunost Minsk	6	0	0	0	2
24	D	Ruslan Salei	Colorado Avalanche	6	1	1	2	8
82	F	Artyom Senkevich	Yunost Minsk	4	0	0	0	2
26	F	Andrei Stas	Dinamo Minsk	6	1	2	3	4
16	F	Mikhail Stefanovich	Quebec Remparts	6	2	0	2	2
5	D	Nikolai Stasenko	Amur Khabarovsk	6	0	1	1	4
18	F	Alexei Ugarov	MVD Balashikha	6	0	2	2	0

=== Goaltenders ===
Number	Player	Club	GP	W	L	Min	GA	GAA	SV%	SO
1	Vitali Koval	Dinamo Minsk	3	2	1	180	7	2.33	0.907	0
31	Andrei Mezin	Dinamo Minsk	3	1	2	184	6	1.96	0.942	0
2	Sergei Shabanov	Yunost Minsk	0	–	–	–	–	–	–	–

== Canada ==
- Head coach: Craig MacTavish (CAN)

=== Skaters ===
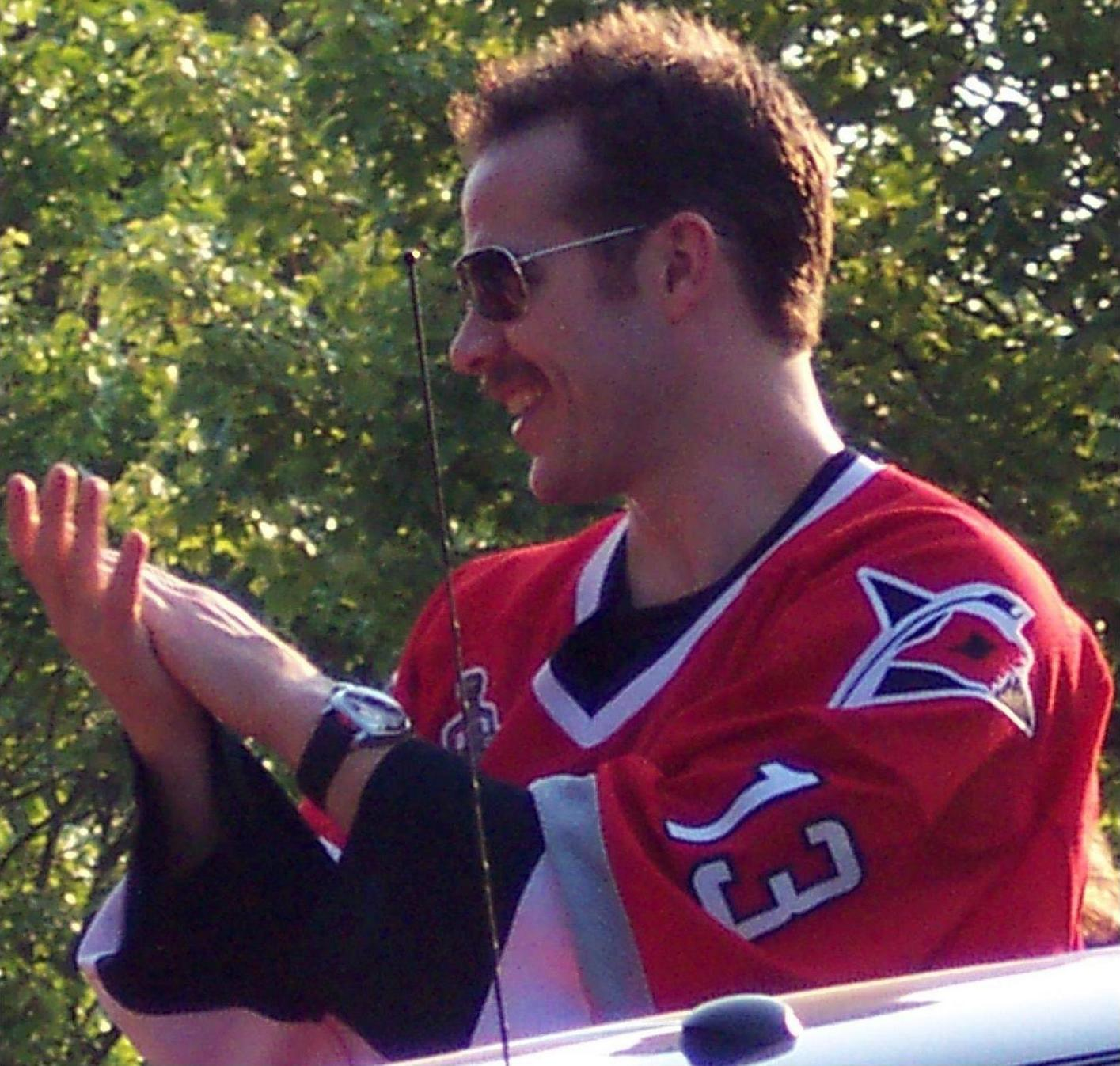
Ray Whitney recorded two goals and six assists, finishing first in team scoring.

Number	Position	Player	Club	GP	G	A	Pts	PIM
22	D	François Beauchemin	Toronto Maple Leafs	7	0	1	1	0
17	F	Rene Bourque	Calgary Flames	7	1	1	2	14
8	D	Brent Burns	Minnesota Wild	7	0	5	5	12
28	D	Kyle Cumiskey	Colorado Avalanche	7	0	3	3	0
4	D	Michael Del Zotto	New York Rangers	5	0	0	0	0
9	F	Steve Downie	Tampa Bay Lightning	7	2	0	2	28
92	F	Matt Duchene	Colorado Avalanche	7	4	3	7	0
14	F	Jordan Eberle	Regina Pats	4	1	3	4	0
5	D	Mark Giordano	Calgary Flames	7	3	1	4	10
19	F	Evander Kane	Atlanta Thrashers	7	2	2	4	6
21	F	Brooks Laich	Washington Capitals	7	1	0	1	0
57	D	Tyler Myers	Buffalo Sabres	7	0	2	2	4
29	F	Steve Ott	Dallas Stars	7	0	1	1	20
10	F	Corey Perry	Anaheim Ducks	7	2	4	6	8
47	F	Rich Peverley	Atlanta Thrashers	7	1	3	4	4
11	F	Mason Raymond	Vancouver Canucks	3	0	1	1	0
2	D	Kris Russell	Columbus Blue Jackets	7	1	3	4	2
94	F	Ryan Smyth	Los Angeles Kings	1	0	0	0	0
18	D	Marc Staal	New York Rangers	7	0	1	1	2
91	F	Steven Stamkos	Tampa Bay Lightning	5	2	1	3	10
20	F	John Tavares	New York Islanders	7	7	0	7	6
13	F	Ray Whitney	Carolina Hurricanes	7	2	6	8	0

=== Goaltenders ===
Number	Player	Club	GP	W	L	Min	GA	GAA	SV%	SO
40	Devan Dubnyk	Edmonton Oilers	0	–	–	–	–	–	–	–
30	Chad Johnson	Hartford Wolf Pack	3	0	0	73	1	0.82	0.964	0
50	Chris Mason	St. Louis Blues	7	3	4	343	16	2.80	0.896	0

== Czech Republic ==
- Head coach: Vladimír Růžička (CZE)

=== Skaters ===
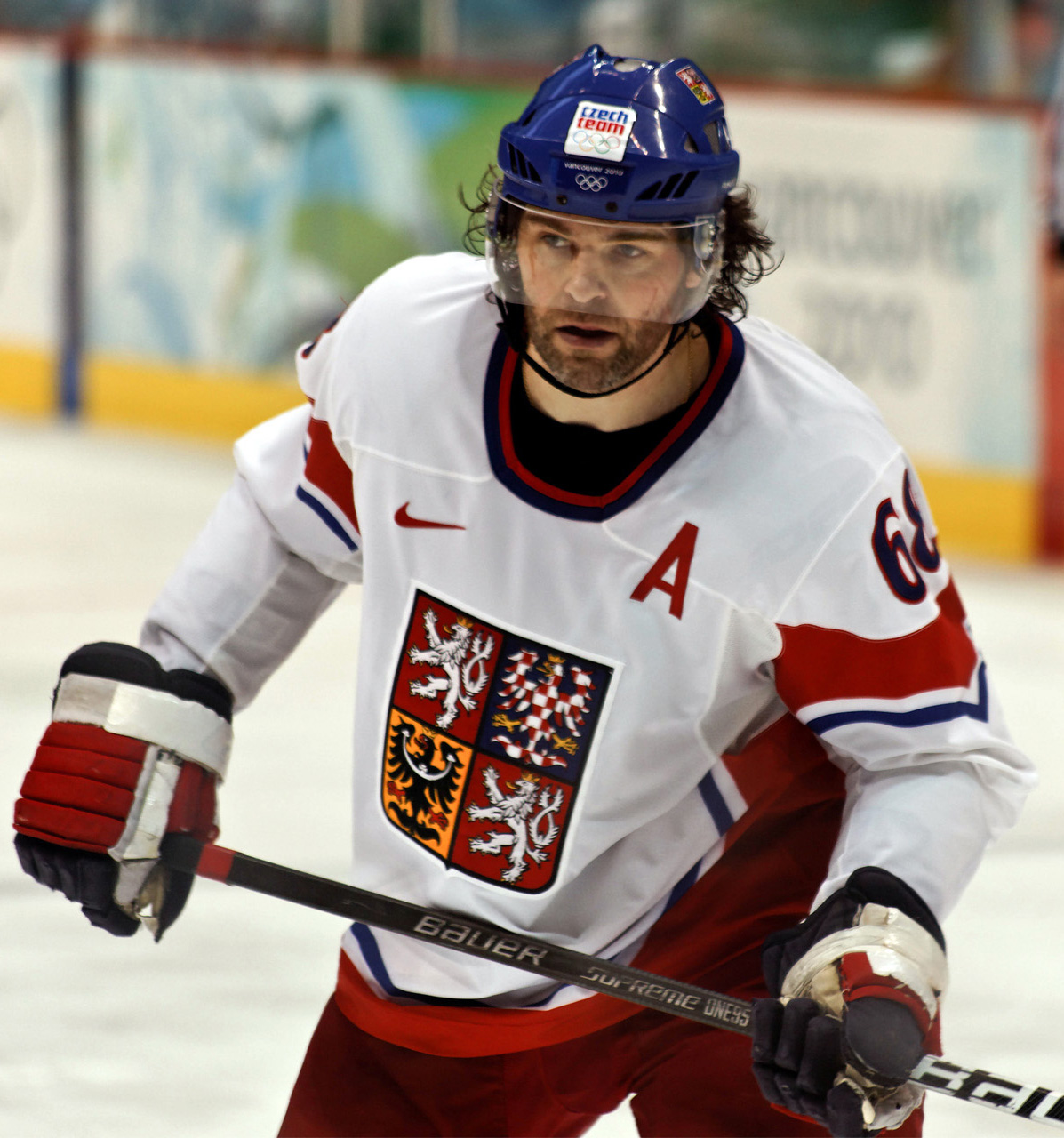
With seven points in nine games, Jaromír Jágr tied for first amongst his team in scoring.

Number	Position	Player	Club	GP	G	A	Pts	PIM
8	D	Michal Barinka	Vítkovice Steel	4	0	0	0	4
44	D	Miroslav Blaťák	Salavat Yulaev Ufa	9	2	1	3	4
36	D	Petr Čáslava	Timrå	9	0	0	0	6
10	F	Roman Červenka	Slavia Praha	9	1	1	2	2
23	D	Petr Gřegořek	České Budějovice	9	1	0	1	4
11	F	Petr Hubáček	Kometa Brno	9	2	0	2	0
68	F	Jaromír Jágr	Avangard Omsk	9	3	4	7	12
22	F	Lukáš Kašpar	Kärpät	9	2	1	3	4
20	F	Jakub Klepiš	Avangard Omsk	9	3	4	7	8
42	F	Petr Koukal	Pardubice	9	0	2	2	2
91	F	Marek Kvapil	Vítkovice Steel	8	0	0	0	0
15	F	Jan Marek	Metallurg Magnitogorsk	9	3	0	3	4
6	D	Tomáš Mojžíš	MoDo Ornskoldsvik	6	1	0	1	4
63	D	Ondřej Němec	Energie Karlovy Vary	6	0	1	1	0
5	D	Filip Novák	MVD Balashikha	3	0	1	1	4
12	F	Jiří Novotný	Barys Astana	9	1	5	6	12
4	D	Karel Rachůnek	Dynamo Moscow	9	2	2	4	10
60	F	Tomáš Rolinek	Metallurg Magnitogorsk	9	4	1	5	12
3	D	Michal Rozsíval	New York Rangers	9	0	2	2	4
27	F	Martin Růžička	Oceláři Třinec	9	3	4	7	8
14	F	Petr Vampola	Plzeň 1929	9	0	2	2	4
93	F	Jakub Voráček	Columbus Blue Jackets	9	0	2	2	6

=== Goaltenders ===
Number	Player	Club	GP	W	L	Min	GA	GAA	SV%	SO
31	Ondřej Pavelec	Atlanta Thrashers	1	0	1	59	3	3.05	0.800	0
33	Jakub Štěpánek	Vítkovice Steel	0	–	–	–	–	–	–	–
29	Tomáš Vokoun	Florida Panthers	8	5	1	496	13	1.57	0.944	0

== Denmark ==
- Head coach: Per Bäckman (SWE)

=== Skaters ===
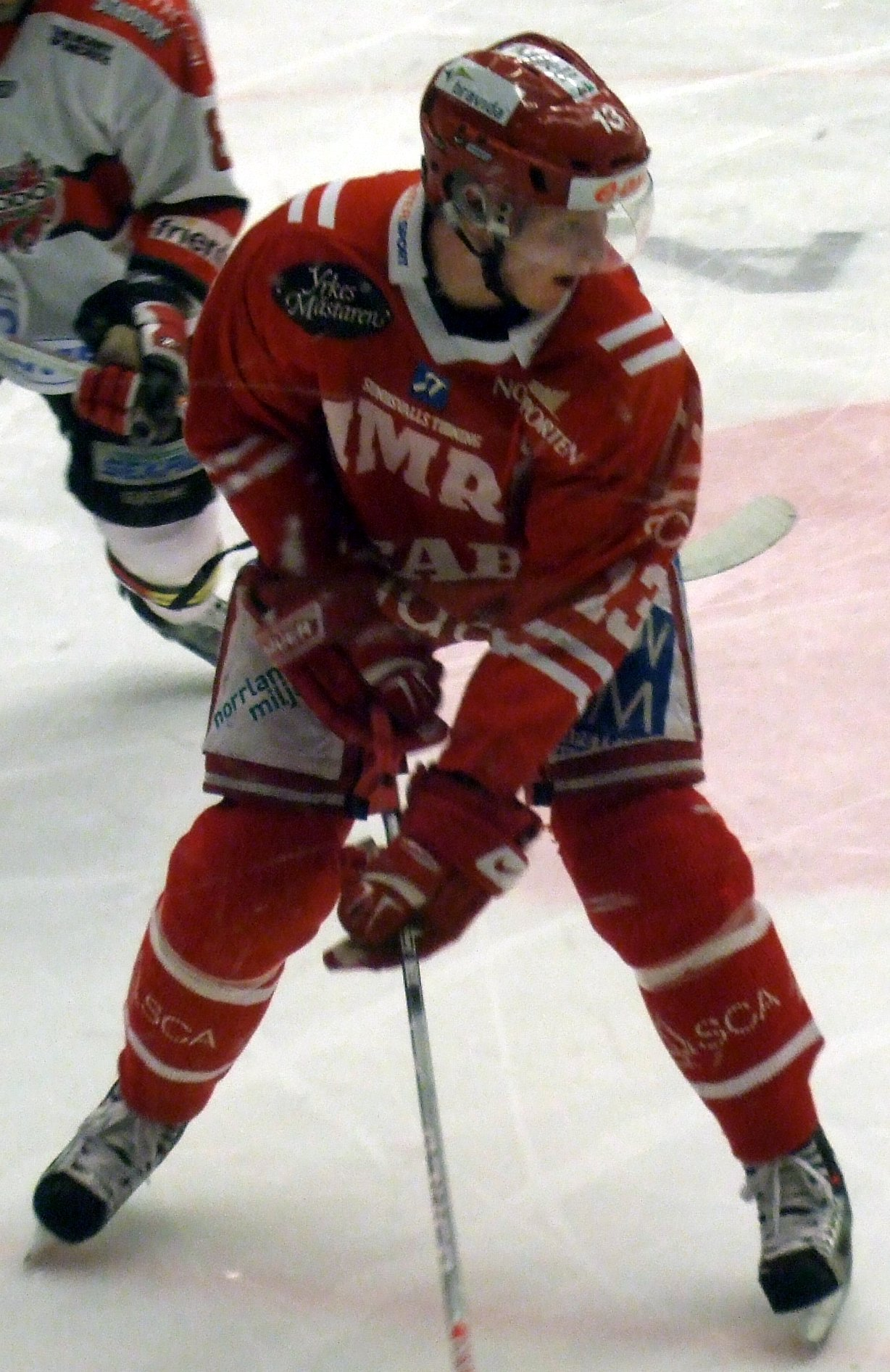
Peter Regin played seven games, recording two goals and five assists, finishing first among his team in scoring.

Number	Position	Player	Club	GP	G	A	Pts	PIM
4	D	Mads Bødker	Rögle	7	0	1	1	2
27	D	Mads Christensen	Frederikshavn White Hawks	7	0	0	0	2
60	F	Mads Christensen	Iserlohn Roosters	7	2	0	2	2
7	D	Jesper Damgaard	Malmö Redhawks	7	1	3	4	8
9	F	Kasper Degn	Bietigheim Steelers	7	0	2	2	2
21	F	Thor Dresler	Herning Blue Fox	7	0	1	1	0
40	D	Jesper Duus	Rødovre Mighty Bulls	2	0	0	0	0
61	F	Lars Eller	Peoria Rivermen	7	2	3	5	8
13	F	Morten Green	Malmö Redhawks	6	1	2	3	10
44	F	Nichlas Hardt	Malmö Redhawks	7	0	0	0	6
33	F	Julian Jakobsen	Södertälje	7	1	1	2	4
22	F	Jesper Jensen	Frederikshavn White Hawks	4	0	0	0	0
3	D	Philip Larsen	Frölunda	7	2	0	2	4
6	D	Stefan Lassen	Leksand	7	2	0	2	2
23	F	Kim Lykkeskov	SønderjyskE	7	0	0	0	0
29	F	Morten Madsen	Modo	7	2	2	4	6
5	D	Daniel Nielsen	Herning Blue Fox	7	0	3	3	4
51	F	Frans Nielsen	New York Islanders	7	2	3	5	6
93	F	Peter Regin	Ottawa Senators	7	2	5	7	6
19	F	Kim Staal	Malmö Redhawks	7	0	1	1	2
12	F	Alexander Sundberg	Hvidovre	7	0	0	0	2

=== Goaltenders ===
Number	Player	Club	GP	W	L	Min	GA	GAA	SV%	SO
30	Frederik Andersen	Frederikshavn White Hawks	2	1	1	120	7	3.50	0.899	0
1	Patrick Galbraith	Björklöven	5	2	3	298	10	2.01	0.935	1
84	Peter Hirsch	Coventry Blaze	0	–	–	–	–	–	–	–

== Finland ==
- Head coach: Jukka Jalonen (FIN)

=== Skaters ===
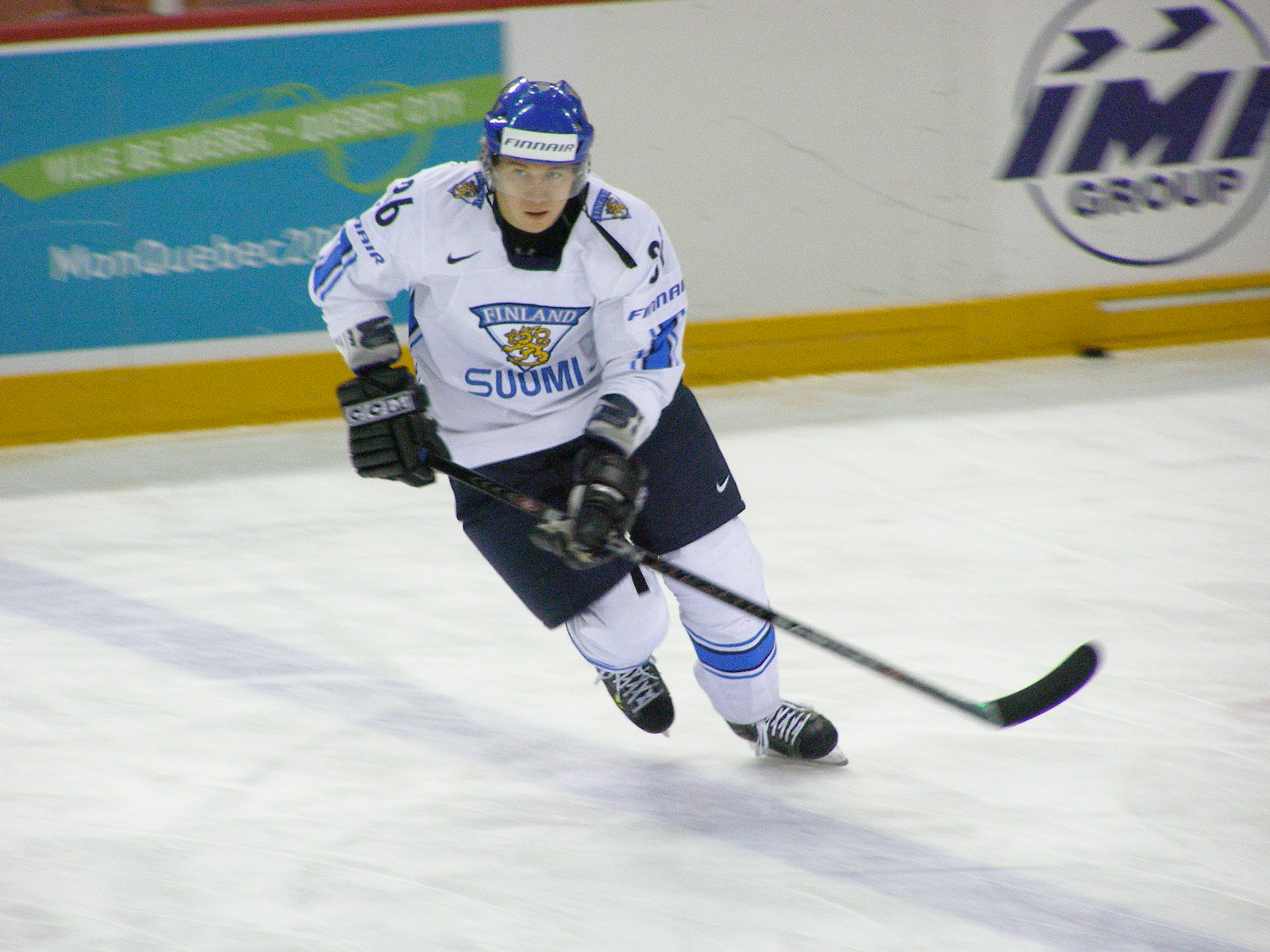
Jussi Jokinen led the Finnish team in penalties with 20 PIM.

Number	Position	Player	Club	GP	G	A	Pts	PIM
50	F	Juhamatti Aaltonen	Pelicans	7	1	2	3	2
23	F	Riku Hahl	Frölunda	6	0	1	1	0
11	D	Juuso Hietanen	Brynäs	2	0	0	0	0
15	F	Juha-Pekka Hytönen	JYP	7	1	0	1	2
26	F	Jarkko Immonen	Ak Bars Kazan	7	3	1	4	4
6	D	Topi Jaakola	Södertälje	7	0	1	1	4
36	F	Jussi Jokinen	Carolina Hurricanes	7	2	1	3	20
24	F	Sami Kapanen	KalPa	7	1	1	2	0
71	F	Leo Komarov	Dynamo Moscow	7	1	0	1	0
27	F	Petri Kontiola	Metallurg Magnitogorsk	7	3	0	3	2
29	F	Lauri Korpikoski	Phoenix Coyotes	7	0	0	0	0
5	D	Lasse Kukkonen	Avangard Omsk	6	0	0	0	2
52	F	Jori Lehterä	Tappara	5	0	0	0	0
7	D	Mikko Mäenpää	HPK	7	0	1	1	2
20	F	Antti Miettinen	Minnesota Wild	6	0	2	2	4
21	D	Janne Niskala	Frölunda	7	0	2	2	4
3	D	Petteri Nummelin	Lugano	6	1	6	7	0
45	F	Oskar Osala	Albany River Rats	4	0	0	0	2
40	F	Antti Pihlström	JYP	7	0	1	1	4
41	D	Pasi Puistola	HV71	6	0	3	3	0
22	F	Tommi Santala	Kloten Flyers	6	0	0	0	4
44	D	Sami Vatanen	JYP	7	0	0	0	6

=== Goaltenders ===
Number	Player	Club	GP	W	L	Min	GA	GAA	SV%	SO
35	Pekka Rinne	Nashville Predators	4	2	2	249	7	1.68	0.929	1
30	Iiro Tarkki	Espoo Blues	0	–	–	–	–	–	–	–
31	Petri Vehanen	Ak Bars Kazan	3	2	1	180	7	2.33	0.918	1

== France ==
- Head coach: David Henderson (FRA)

=== Skaters ===
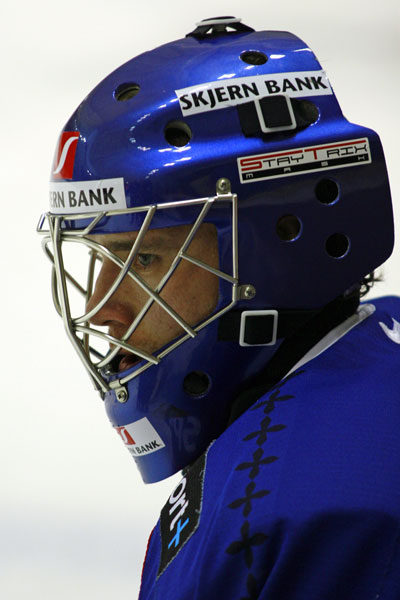
Goaltender Fabrice Lhenry started five games, winning two.

Number	Position	Player	Club	GP	G	A	Pts	PIM
27	D	Baptiste Amar	Rögle	6	2	1	3	4
18	D	Yohann Auvitu	JYP	6	0	2	2	4
3	D	Vincent Bachet	Gothiques d'Amiens	6	0	0	0	6
41	F	Pierre-Édouard Bellemare	Skellefteå	6	1	2	3	4
74	D	Nicolas Besch	Brûleurs de Loups	6	0	1	1	12
14	F	Stéphane Da Costa	Merrimack College	5	1	2	3	14
80	F	Teddy Da Costa	Zagłębie Sosnowiec	0	–	–	–	–
28	F	Laurent Gras	Chamonix	6	2	0	2	2
84	F	Kevin Hecquefeuille	Kölner Haie	6	0	1	1	6
22	F	Brian Henderson	Gothiques d'Amiens	6	0	0	0	0
8	D	Kévin Igier	Ducs d'Angers	3	0	0	0	0
19	F	Loïc Lampérier	Dragons de Rouen	3	0	0	0	0
26	F	Anthoine Lussier	Lausanne	6	0	1	1	2
44	D	Antonin Manavian	Brûleurs de Loups	3	0	0	0	2
10	F	Laurent Meunier	Timrå	5	2	1	3	4
81	F	Erwan Pain	Ducs de Dijon	2	0	0	0	0
16	D	Benoît Quessandier	Dauphins d'Épinal	6	0	0	0	2
82	F	Damien Raux	Diables Rouges de Briançon	6	0	0	0	0
38	D	Thomas Roussel	Gothiques d'Amiens	6	0	0	0	2
13	F	Luc Tardif	Dragons de Rouen	6	1	2	3	14
77	F	Sacha Treille	Malmö Redhawks	6	1	1	2	4
7	F	Yorick Treille	Vítkovice Steel	6	2	0	2	2

=== Goaltenders ===
Number	Player	Club	GP	W	L	Min	GA	GAA	SV%	SO
1	Eddy Ferhi	Brûleurs de Loups	2	0	2	108	7	3.89	0.901	0
49	Florian Hardy	Ducs de Dijon	0	–	–	–	–	–	–	–
42	Fabrice Lhenry	Dragons de Rouen	5	2	2	251	15	3.59	0.901	0

== Germany ==
- Head coach: Uwe Krupp (GER)

=== Skaters ===
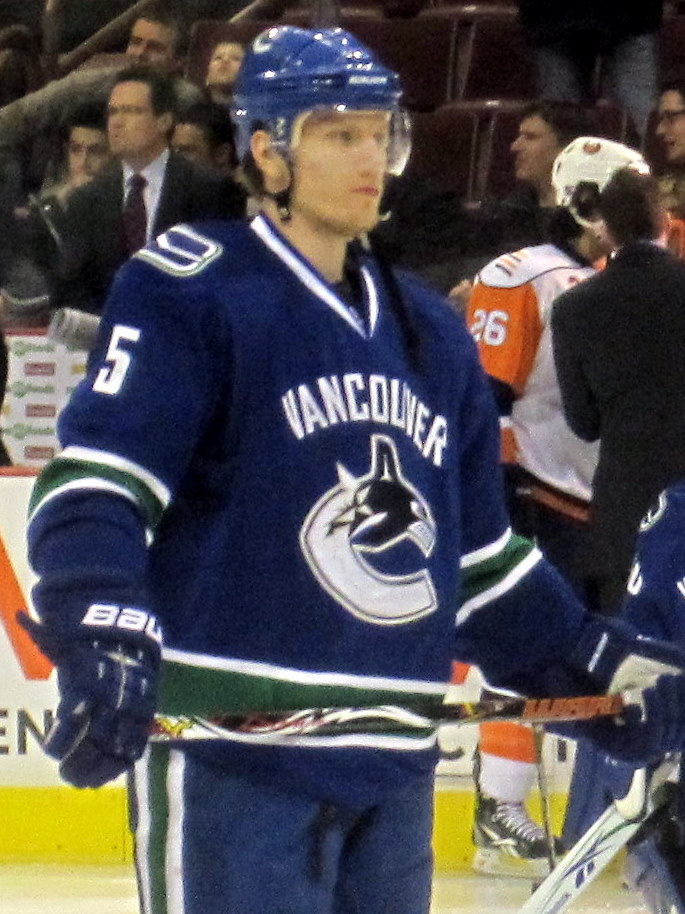
Christian Ehrhoff played six games for the German team, scoring one goal and one assist.

Number	Position	Player	Club	GP	G	A	Pts	PIM
29	F	Alexander Barta	Hamburg Freezers	9	3	1	4	0
90	D	Constantin Braun	Eisbären Berlin	9	0	0	0	4
6	D	Sven Butenschön	Adler Mannheim	7	0	0	0	2
20	D	Robert Dietrich	Milwaukee Admirals	9	0	0	0	2
10	D	Christian Ehrhoff	Vancouver Canucks	6	1	1	2	0
57	F	Marcel Goc	Nashville Predators	9	2	0	2	4
77	D	Nikolai Goc	Hannover Scorpions	9	1	0	1	4
87	F	Philip Gogulla	Portland Pirates	7	1	0	1	0
50	F	Patrick Hager	Krefeld Pinguine	7	0	0	0	8
5	D	Korbinian Holzer	DEG Metro Stars	8	0	0	0	22
18	F	Kai Hospelt	Grizzly Adams Wolfsburg	9	0	2	2	2
48	D	Frank Hördler	Eisbären Berlin	1	0	0	0	0
11	F	Sven Felski	Eisbären Berlin	9	0	3	3	8
26	F	Daniel Kreutzer	DEG Metro Stars	7	1	3	4	6
3	D	Justin Krueger	Cornell University	9	0	1	1	0
25	F	Marcel Müller	Kölner Haie	9	1	1	2	0
24	F	André Rankel	Eisbären Berlin	9	0	0	0	0
55	F	Felix Schütz	Portland Pirates	9	2	2	4	4
52	D	Alexander Sulzer	Milwaukee Admirals	9	0	2	2	4
21	F	John Tripp	Hamburg Freezers	9	0	0	0	6
47	F	Christoph Ullmann	Kölner Haie	9	0	1	1	4
16	F	Michael Wolf	Iserlohn Roosters	9	1	1	2	2

=== Goaltenders ===
Number	Player	Club	GP	W	L	Min	GA	GAA	SV%	SO
44	Dennis Endras	Augsburger Panther	6	4	2	364	7	1.15	0.961	1
1	Dimitri Kotschnew	Spartak Moscow	1	0	1	59	3	3.04	0.917	0
72	Rob Zepp	Eisbären Berlin	2	0	2	117	3	1.54	0.956	0

== Italy ==
- Head coach: Rick Cornacchia (ITA)

=== Skaters ===
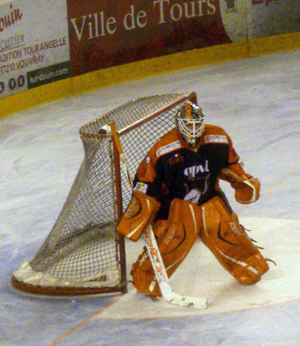
Goaltender Adam Russo conceded eight goals and finished with a save percentage of 0.882.

Number	Position	Player	Club	GP	G	A	Pts	PIM
71	F	Luca Ansoldi	Ritten Sport	6	0	0	0	6
50	D	Christian Borgatello	Bolzano-Bozen Foxes	6	1	1	2	2
9	F	Giorgio de Bettin	Cortina	3	0	0	0	2
19	D	Matthew de Marchi	Asiago	6	0	0	0	10
28	F	Manuel de Toni	Alleghe	6	0	0	0	2
17	F	Alexander Egger	Bolzano-Bozen Foxes	5	1	2	3	0
87	F	Nicola Fontanive	Alleghe	6	0	0	0	4
26	D	Armin Helfer	Pustertal-Val Pusteria Wolves	4	0	0	0	4
7	D	Armin Hofer	Pustertal-Val Pusteria Wolves	5	0	0	0	2
16	F	Patrick Iannone	Valpellice	6	0	1	1	4
5	D	Trevor Johnson	Bolzano-Bozen Foxes	6	0	1	1	6
23	D	Stefano Marchetti	Pontebba	3	0	0	0	0
22	F	Stefano Margoni	Fassa	6	1	0	1	4
3	F	Max Oberrauch	Pustertal-Val Pusteria Wolves	6	0	0	0	2
8	F	John Parco	Asiago	6	0	0	0	2
39	F	Jonathan Pittis	Bolzano-Bozen Foxes	1	0	0	0	0
44	D	Nicholas Plastino	Asiago	6	0	1	1	2
11	F	Roland Ramoser	Bolzano-Bozen Foxes	6	0	1	1	2
10	F	Giulio Scandella	Rögle	6	2	1	3	2
27	F	Michael Souza	Cortina	6	1	4	5	2
6	D	Michele Strazzabosco	Asiago	6	2	0	2	10
2	F	Stefan Zisser	Bolzano-Bozen Foxes	6	0	0	0	0

=== Goaltenders ===
Number	Player	Club	GP	W	L	Min	GA	GAA	SV%	SO
30	Daniel Bellissimo	Asiago	5	1	3	264	9	2.05	0.948	0
1	Adam Russo	Port Huron Icehawks	2	0	2	99	8	4.83	0.882	0
34	Thomas Tragust	Kaufbeuren	0	–	–	–	–	–	–	–

== Kazakhstan ==
- Head coach: Andrei Shayanov (RUS)

=== Skaters ===
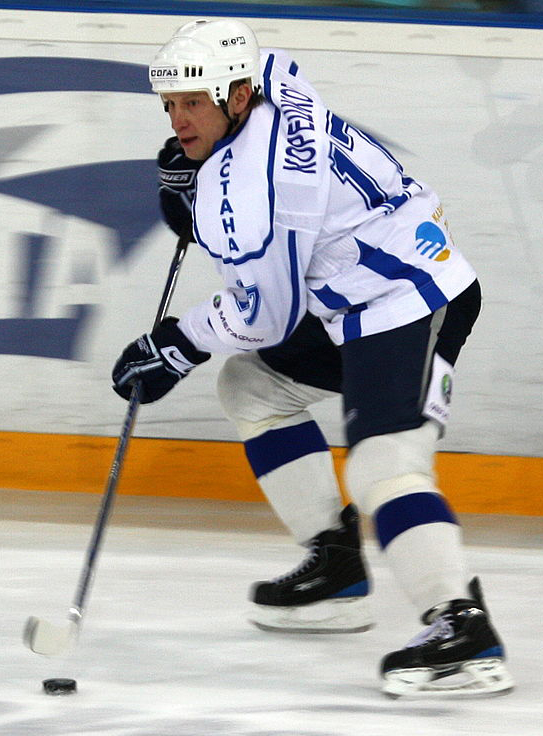
Aleksandr Koreshkov played six games for the Kazakh team, recording one assist.

Number	Position	Player	Club	GP	G	A	Pts	PIM
9	D	Vladimir Antipin	Barys Astana	6	1	0	1	4
27	F	Evgeni Bumagin	Metallurg Novokuznetsk	6	0	0	0	2
21	F	Dmitri Dudarev	Metallurg Novokuznetsk	6	4	0	4	8
37	D	Evgeni Fadeyev	Avtomobilist Yekaterinburg	3	0	0	0	4
33	F	Andrei Gavrilin	Barys Astana	6	0	1	1	2
4	D	Anton Kazantsev	Barys Astana	1	0	0	0	2
52	D	Alexei Koledayev	Metallurg Novokuznetsk	6	0	1	1	2
17	F	Aleksandr Koreshkov	Barys Astana	6	0	1	1	0
62	F	Vadim Krasnoslabodtsev	Barys Astana	6	1	0	1	14
5	D	Alexei Litvinenko	Vityaz Chekhov	6	0	0	0	0
16	D	Georgi Petrov	Kazzinc-Torpedo	3	0	0	0	2
88	F	Evgeni Rymarev	Barys Astana	6	0	0	0	0
2	D	Roman Savchenko	Barys Astana	6	0	0	0	2
7	D	Maxim Semenov	Atlant Moscow Oblast	6	0	1	1	4
24	F	Konstantin Shafranov	Fort Wayne Komets	6	0	4	4	0
49	F	Alexander Shin	Barys Astana	6	0	0	0	2
25	F	Ilya Solarev	Barys Astana	6	0	0	0	2
23	F	Andrei Spiridonov	Barys Astana	6	0	0	0	2
48	F	Roman Starchenko	Barys Astana	6	2	0	2	2
29	D	Alexei Vassilchenko	Barys Astana	6	0	1	1	10
54	F	Alexei Vorontsov	Barys Astana	3	0	0	0	16
8	F	Talgat Zhailauov	Barys Astana	6	0	0	0	0

=== Goaltenders ===
Number	Player	Club	GP	W	L	Min	GA	GAA	SV%	SO
20	Alexei Kuznetsov	Barys Astana	1	0	1	20	4	12.00	0.778	0
31	Vitaliy Yeremeyev	Dynamo Moscow	5	0	5	300	21	4.20	0.850	0
1	Pavel Zhitkov	Barys Astana	1	0	0	40	6	9.00	0.778	0

== Latvia ==
- Head coach: Oļegs Znaroks (GER)

=== Skaters ===
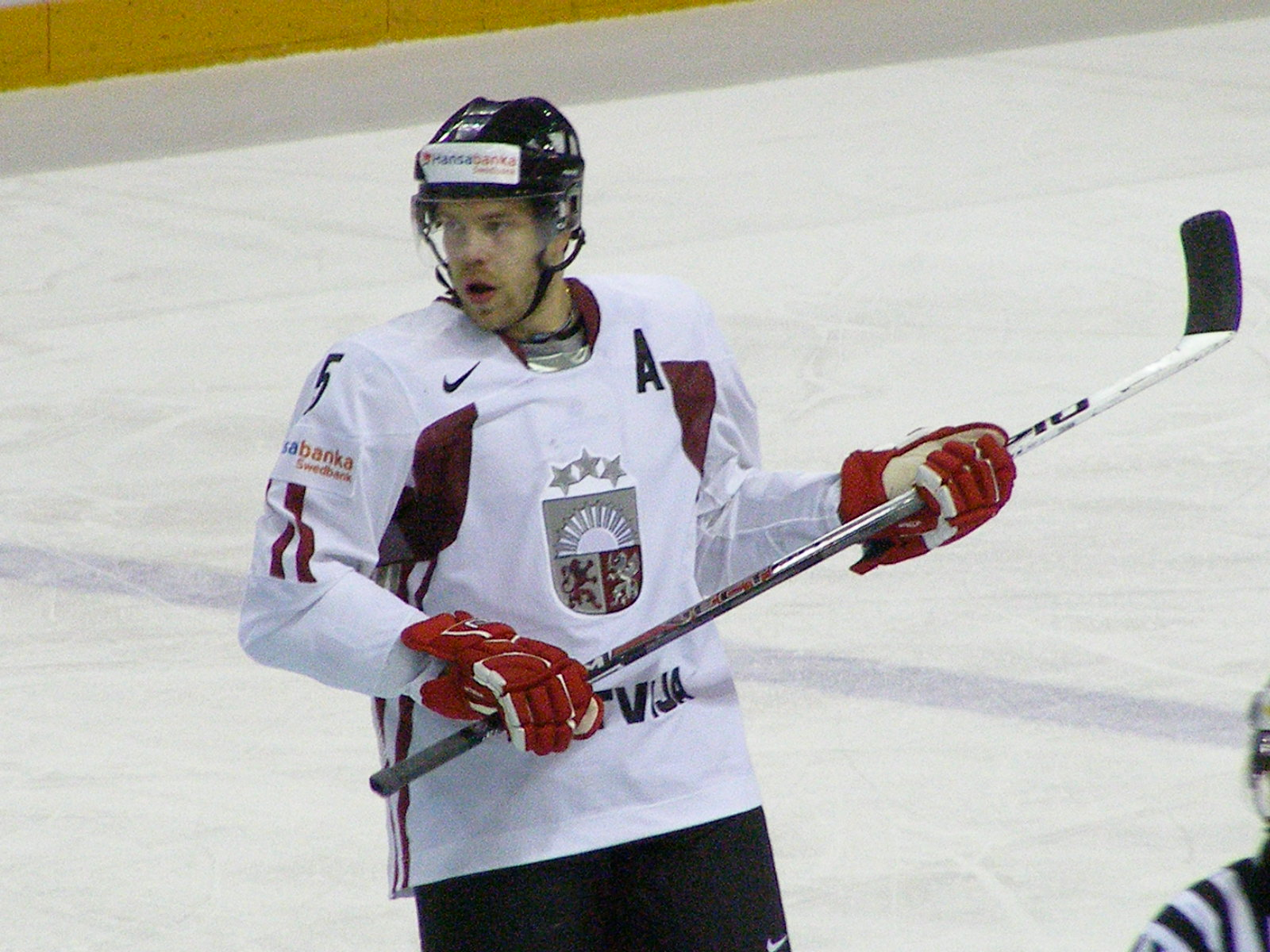
Jānis Sprukts recorded two goals and three assists, finishing first in team scoring.

Number	Position	Player	Club	GP	G	A	Pts	PIM
14	D	Jānis Andersons	Oceláři Třinec	5	0	0	0	2
47	F	Mārtiņš Cipulis	Dinamo Riga	6	1	1	2	0
16	F	Kaspars Daugaviņš	Binghamton Senators	6	2	1	3	0
10	F	Lauris Dārziņš	Dinamo Riga	6	1	0	1	0
23	F	Andris Džeriņš	Dinamo Riga	6	0	1	1	4
13	D	Guntis Galviņš	Dinamo Riga	6	1	1	2	8
22	D	Māris Jass	Nitra	6	0	0	0	6
15	D	Aleksandrs Jerofejevs	Metallurg Novokuznetsk	6	0	1	1	4
9	F	Mārtiņš Karsums	Dinamo Riga	6	3	1	4	2
32	D	Artūrs Kulda	Chicago Wolves	3	0	0	0	2
87	F	Gints Meija	Dinamo Riga	6	1	1	2	0
17	F	Aleksandrs Ņiživijs	Dinamo Riga	6	1	1	2	0
27	F	Sergejs Pečura	Krylya Sovetov	6	1	0	1	0
71	D	Georgijs Pujacs	Sibir Novosibirsk	6	1	2	3	2
25	D	Jēkabs Rēdlihs	Dinamo Riga	6	0	1	1	4
24	F	Miķelis Rēdlihs	Dinamo Riga	3	0	0	0	2
3	D	Arvīds Reķis	Grizzly Adams Wolfsburg	6	1	0	1	2
18	F	Kaspars Saulietis	HC Litvínov	3	0	1	1	4
11	D	Kristaps Sotnieks	Dinamo Riga	6	0	1	1	0
5	F	Jānis Sprukts	Dinamo Riga	6	2	3	5	2
6	F	Juris Štāls	Quad City Mallards	4	0	2	2	0
12	F	Herberts Vasiļjevs	Krefeld Pinguine	6	0	3	3	8

=== Goaltenders ===
Number	Player	Club	GP	W	L	Min	GA	GAA	SV%	SO
30	Edgars Lūsiņš	Fischtown Pinguins	0	–	–	–	–	–	–	–
31	Edgars Masaļskis	Dinamo Riga	6	2	4	327	15	2.76	0.914	1
1	Mārtiņš Raitums	Hull Stingrays	1	0	0	32	2	3.70	0.818	0

== Norway ==
- Head coach: Roy Johansen (NOR)

=== Skaters ===
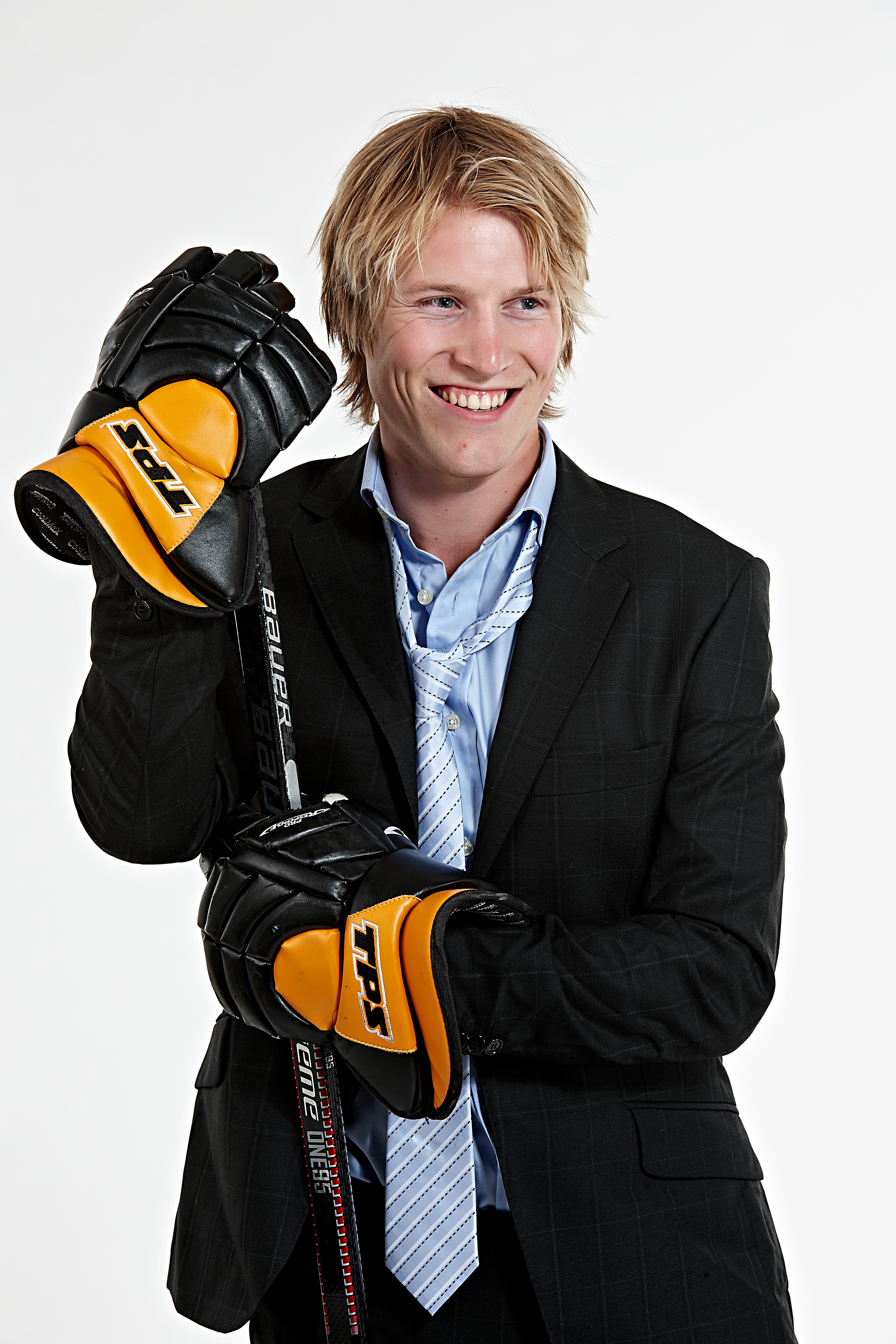
Mathis Olimb played six games for the Norwegian team, scoring one goal and three assists.

Number	Position	Player	Club	GP	G	A	Pts	PIM
20	F	Anders Bastiansen	Färjestad	6	3	1	4	4
47	D	Alexander Bonsaksen	Modo	6	0	0	0	6
44	D	Brede Frettem Csiszar	Vålerenga	2	0	0	0	0
26	F	Kristian Forsberg	Modo	6	0	1	1	0
52	F	Anders Fredriksen	Vålerenga	6	1	3	4	0
6	D	Jonas Holøs	Färjestad	6	1	1	2	8
9	F	Marius Holtet	Färjestad	4	0	0	0	4
7	D	Tommy Jakobsen	Lørenskog	4	0	1	1	29
5	D	Juha Kaunismäki	Stavanger Oilers	6	0	0	0	4
35	F	Martin Laumann Ylven	Linköping	4	0	0	0	31
14	F	Peter Lorentzen	Stavanger Oilers	5	1	0	1	2
37	D	Lars Løkken Østli	Storhamar Dragons	6	0	2	2	2
25	F	Andreas Martinsen	Lillehammer	3	0	0	0	0
40	F	Ken André Olimb	Frisk Tigers	6	0	0	0	0
46	F	Mathis Olimb	Frölunda	6	1	3	4	0
22	F	Martin Røymark	Frölunda	6	0	1	1	4
39	D	Henrik Solberg	Stavanger Oilers	6	1	0	1	2
16	F	Knut Henrik Spets	Vålerenga	6	0	0	0	0
10	F	Lars Erik Spets	Vålerenga	6	1	2	3	0
41	F	Patrick Thoresen	Salavat Yulaev Ufa	6	2	4	6	2
55	D	Ole-Kristian Tollefsen	Grand Rapids Griffins	3	0	1	1	2
48	F	Mats Zuccarello Aasen	Modo	6	3	1	4	6

=== Goaltenders ===
Number	Player	Club	GP	W	L	Min	GA	GAA	SV%	SO
33	Pål Grotnes	Stjernen	5	3	2	299	14	2.81	0.926	0
34	André Lysenstøen	HeKi	1	0	0	14	2	8.54	0.833	0
30	Ruben Smith	Storhamar Dragons	2	0	1	47	10	12.87	0.697	0

== Russia ==
- Head coach: Vyacheslav Bykov (RUS)

=== Skaters ===
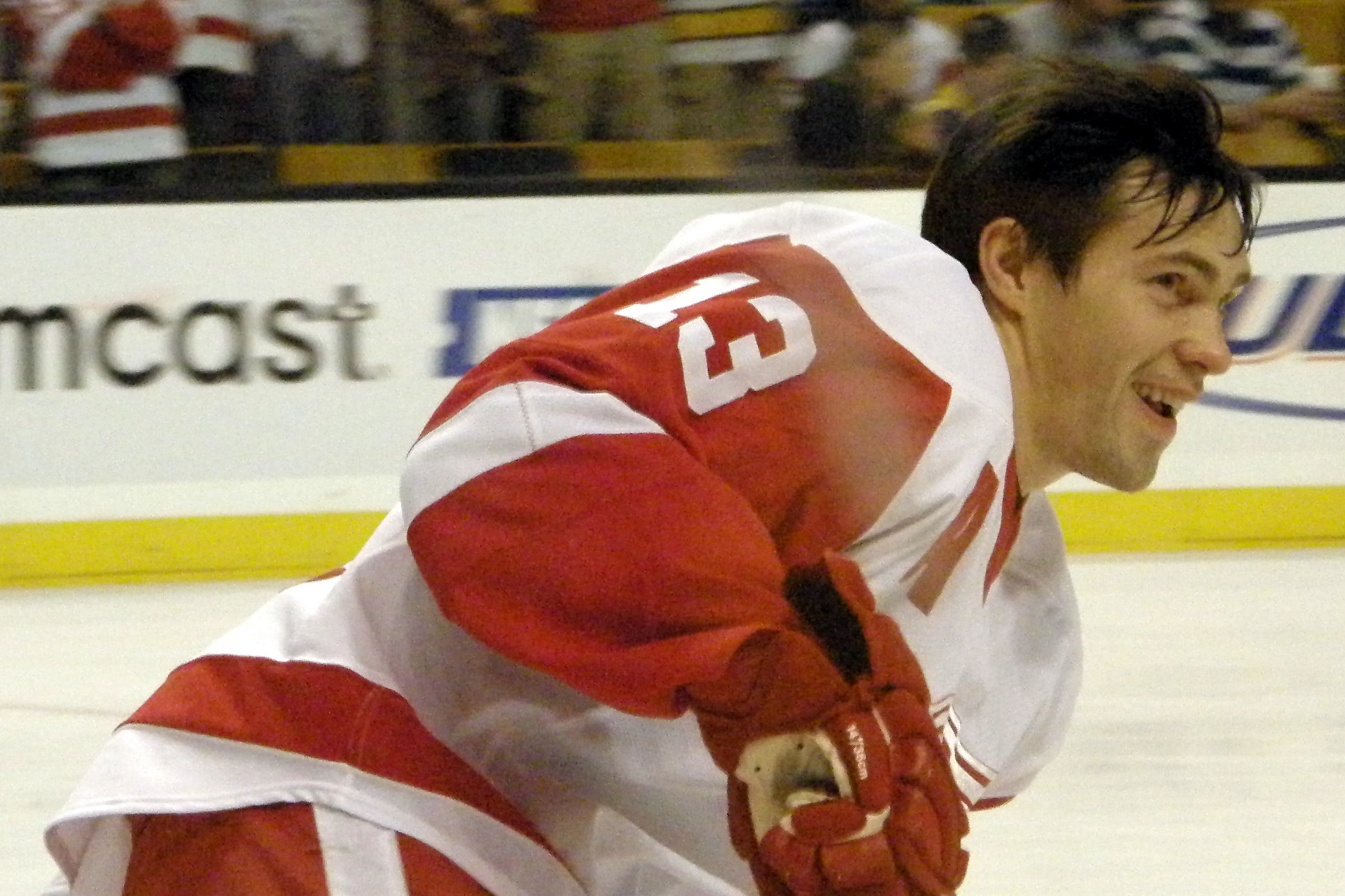
Pavel Datsyuk was named the tournament's best forward.

Number	Position	Player	Club	GP	G	A	Pts	PIM
61	F	Maxim Afinogenov	Atlanta Thrashers	9	3	4	7	18
42	F	Artem Anisimov	New York Rangers	9	1	2	3	6
27	D	Vitaly Atyushov	Metallurg Magnitogorsk	9	0	4	4	4
13	F	Pavel Datsyuk	Detroit Red Wings	6	6	1	7	0
29	F	Sergei Fedorov	Metallurg Magnitogorsk	9	2	4	6	12
24	F	Alexander Frolov	Los Angeles Kings	8	0	1	1	2
55	D	Sergei Gonchar	Pittsburgh Penguins	5	0	4	4	0
37	D	Denis Grebeshkov	Nashville Predators	9	1	0	1	0
7	D	Dmitri Kalinin	Salavat Yulaev Ufa	9	0	1	1	0
22	D	Konstantin Korneyev	CSKA Moscow	9	0	0	0	2
71	F	Ilya Kovalchuk	New Jersey Devils	9	2	10	12	2
52	F	Viktor Kozlov	Salavat Yulaev Ufa	9	1	2	3	2
41	F	Nikolai Kulemin	Toronto Maple Leafs	9	3	2	5	25
43	D	Dmitri Kulikov	Florida Panthers	9	0	2	2	8
11	F	Evgeni Malkin	Pittsburgh Penguins	5	5	2	7	10
10	F	Sergei Mozyakin	Atlant Moscow Oblast	4	1	1	2	0
5	D	Ilya Nikulin	Ak Bars Kazan	9	0	2	2	2
8	F	Alexander Ovechkin	Washington Capitals	9	5	1	6	4
28	F	Alexander Semin	Washington Capitals	8	1	4	5	12
33	F	Maxim Sushinski	SKA Saint Petersburg	5	0	1	1	8
23	F	Alexei Tereshchenko	Ak Bars Kazan	9	0	1	1	4
74	D	Alexei Yemelin	Ak Bars Kazan	9	1	1	2	33

=== Goaltenders ===
Number	Player	Club	GP	W	L	Min	GA	GAA	SV%	SO
30	Alexander Eremenko	Salavat Yulaev Ufa	1	1	0	60	1	1.00	0.947	0
83	Vasiliy Koshechkin	Metallurg Magnitogorsk	3	3	0	180	3	1.00	0.967	0
40	Semyon Varlamov	Washington Capitals	5	4	1	298	7	1.41	0.951	1

== Slovakia ==
- Head coach: Glen Hanlon (USA)

=== Skaters ===
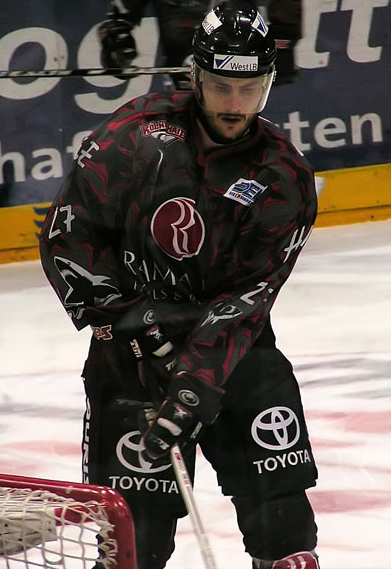
Ivan Čiernik recorded three goals and finished second in team scoring.

Number	Position	Player	Club	GP	G	A	Pts	PIM
61	F	Milan Bartovič	Bílí Tygři Liberec	6	2	2	4	2
88	F	Tomáš Bulík	Banská Bystrica	6	0	0	0	4
27	F	Ivan Čiernik	Kölner Haie	6	3	0	3	4
22	F	Vladimír Dravecký	Košice	6	0	0	0	2
43	D	Peter Frühauf	Banská Bystrica	4	0	1	1	2
15	D	Dominik Graňák	Rögle	6	0	1	1	2
97	F	Stanislav Gron	Košice	3	0	0	0	2
16	F	Roman Kukumberg	Barys Astana	6	0	1	1	0
41	D	Richard Lintner	Dinamo Minsk	6	0	3	3	2
17	F	Michal Macho	Mladá Boleslav	6	0	0	0	0
8	D	Ivan Majeský	Skellefteå	6	1	1	2	0
56	D	Vladimír Mihálik	Norfolk Admirals	6	1	0	1	4
28	F	Richard Pánik	Norfolk Admirals	6	0	2	2	6
14	F	Andrej Podkonický	Bílí Tygři Liberec	6	1	1	2	4
18	F	Miroslav Šatan	Boston Bruins	2	0	0	0	0
44	D	Andrej Sekera	Buffalo Sabres	6	0	2	2	2
19	D	Tomáš Starosta	Neftekhimik Nizhnekamsk	6	0	3	3	4
40	F	Marek Svatoš	Colorado Avalanche	6	1	1	2	6
90	F	Tomáš Tatar	Grand Rapids Griffins	6	2	0	2	4
21	F	Marek Zagrapan	Severstal	6	2	0	2	2
20	F	Miroslav Zálešák	Skalica	3	0	0	0	0

=== Goaltenders ===
Number	Player	Club	GP	W	L	Min	GA	GAA	SV%	SO
31	Peter Budaj	Colorado Avalanche	6	2	4	283	13	2.76	0.913	0
2	Peter Hamerlík	Oceláři Třinec	0	–	–	–	–	–	–	–
35	Rastislav Staňa	Severstal	2	0	0	75	4	3.21	0.902	0

== Sweden ==
- Head coach: Bengt-Åke Gustafsson (SWE)

=== Skaters ===
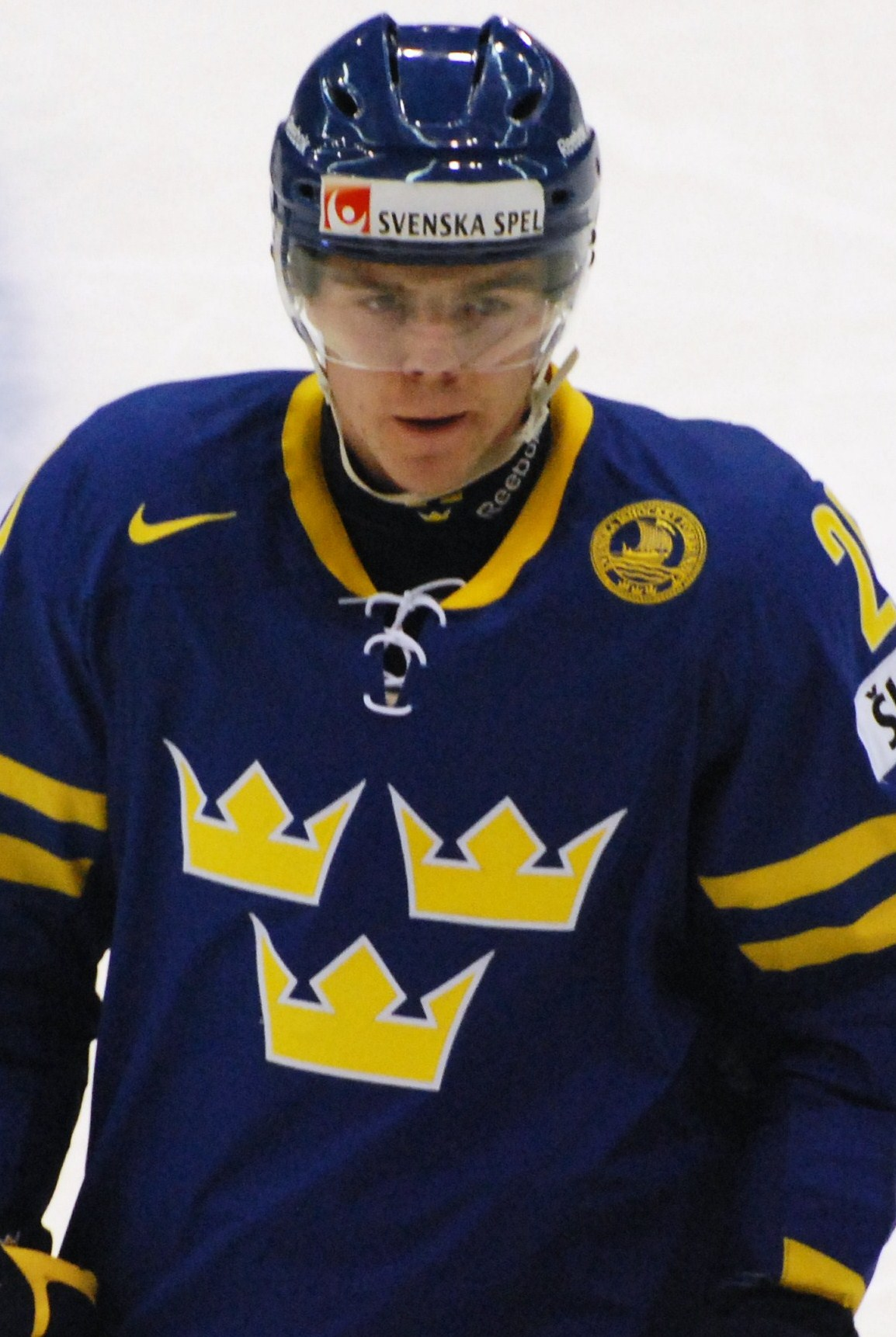
Magnus Pääjärvi-Svensson played nine games, scoring five goals and four assists, and finishing first among his team in scoring.

Number	Position	Player	Club	GP	G	A	Pts	PIM
71	F	Jonas Andersson	Dinamo Minsk	9	6	0	6	6
60	F	Mikael Backlund	Abbotsford Heat	6	0	1	1	2
5	D	Christian Bäckman	Frölunda HC	9	0	3	3	10
3	D	Oliver Ekman-Larsson	Leksands IF	9	1	2	3	2
20	F	Andreas Engqvist	Djurgårdens IF	9	1	3	4	6
21	F	Jimmie Ericsson	Skellefteå AIK	3	0	0	0	4
52	D	Jonathan Ericsson	Detroit Red Wings	7	0	3	3	2
11	D	Carl Gunnarsson	Toronto Maple Leafs	9	1	1	2	2
24	F	Johan Harju	Dynamo Moscow	9	4	1	5	4
77	D	Victor Hedman	Tampa Bay Lightning	9	1	1	2	6
6	D	Magnus Johansson	Linköpings HC	9	0	4	4	6
65	D	Erik Karlsson	Ottawa Senators	9	1	3	4	2
8	D	Sanny Lindström	Färjestads BK	5	0	0	0	0
9	F	Tony Mårtensson	Linköpings HC	9	2	4	6	6
26	F	Marcus Nilson	Djurgårdens IF	9	1	1	2	2
92	F	Michael Nylander	Jokerit	8	1	2	3	4
23	F	Linus Omark	Dynamo Moscow	9	1	3	4	8
91	F	Magnus Pääjärvi-Svensson	Timrå IK	9	5	4	9	2
22	F	Niklas Persson	Neftekhimik Nizhnekamsk	9	0	4	4	0
12	F	Fredrik Pettersson	Frölunda HC	7	1	1	2	4
51	F	Rickard Wallin	Toronto Maple Leafs	9	1	5	6	0
80	F	Mattias Weinhandl	Dynamo Moscow	2	3	0	3	0

=== Goaltenders ===
Number	Player	Club	GP	W	L	Min	GA	GAA	SV%	SO
50	Jonas Gustavsson	Toronto Maple Leafs	6	4	2	370	11	1.79	0.937	0
35	Anders Lindbäck	Timrå	1	0	0	0	0	0	0	0
25	Jacob Markström	Brynäs	3	3	0	180	4	1.33	0.944	1

== Switzerland ==
- Head coach: Sean Simpson (CAN)

=== Skaters ===
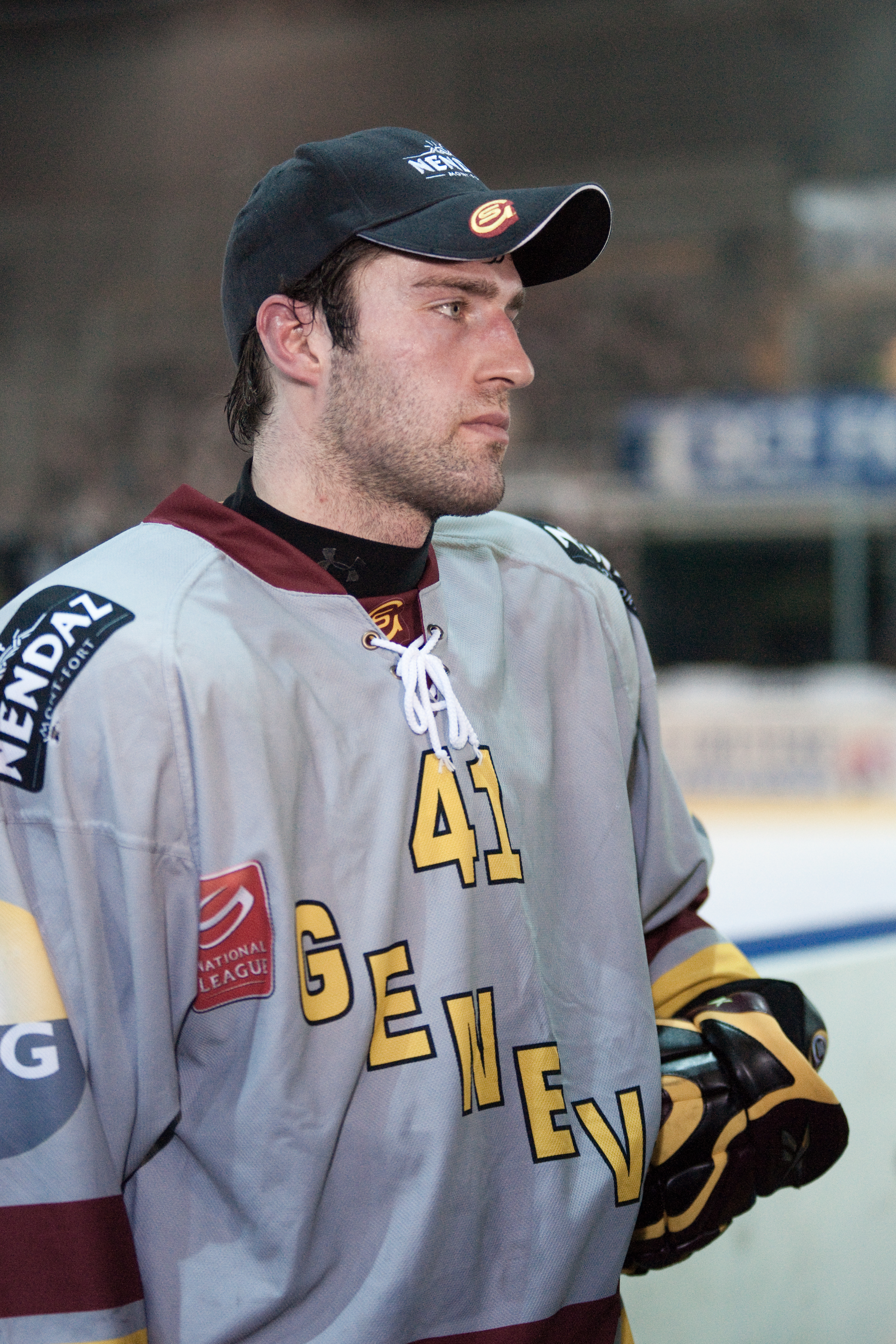
Paul Savary played seven games for the Swiss team, recording one assist.

Number	Position	Player	Club	GP	G	A	Pts	PIM
10	F	Andres Ambühl	Hartford Wolf Pack	7	4	2	6	4
57	D	Goran Bezina	Genève-Servette	7	0	2	2	16
96	F	Damien Brunner	Zug	7	1	4	5	2
37	F	Bjorn Christen	Zug	2	0	0	0	0
18	F	Thomas Déruns	Genève-Servette	7	1	2	3	16
13	D	Félicien Du Bois	Kloten Flyers	7	0	0	0	4
46	F	Paolo Duca	Ambrì-Piotta	7	0	0	0	0
4	D	Patrick Geering	ZSC Lions	1	0	0	0	0
6	D	Timo Helbling	Lugano	7	0	1	1	25
33	D	Steve Hirschi	Lugano	7	0	0	0	0
30	F	Marcel Jenni	Kloten Flyers	7	0	0	0	0
90	D	Roman Josi	Bern	7	1	2	3	0
67	F	Romano Lemm	Lugano	7	0	0	0	2
25	F	Thibaut Monnet	ZSC Lions	7	2	2	4	6
21	F	Nino Niederreiter	Portland Winterhawks	4	0	0	0	4
28	F	Martin Plüss	Bern	7	4	2	6	25
88	F	Kevin Romy	Lugano	7	0	1	1	4
32	F	Ivo Rüthemann	Bern	7	1	3	4	0
9	F	Paul Savary	Genève-Servette	7	0	1	1	2
31	D	Mathias Seger	ZSC Lions	7	0	2	2	6
43	F	Morris Trachsler	Genève-Servette	5	0	0	0	0
3	D	Julien Vauclair	Lugano	7	1	1	2	0

=== Goaltenders ===
Number	Player	Club	GP	W	L	Min	GA	GAA	SV%	SO
26	Martin Gerber	Atlant Moscow Oblast	5	3	2	298	7	1.41	0.936	1
79	Daniel Manzato	Rapperswil-Jona Lakers	0	–	–	–	–	–	–	–
52	Tobias Stephan	Genève-Servette	2	1	1	120	6	3.00	0.895	0

== United States ==
- Head coach: Scott Gordon (USA)

=== Skaters ===
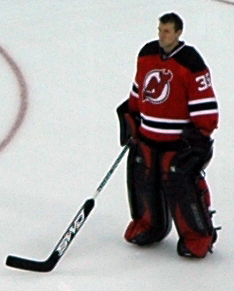
Goaltender Scott Clemmensen started six games, winning two including one shutout.

Number	Position	Player	Club	GP	G	A	Pts	PIM
22	F	Ryan Carter	Anaheim Ducks	6	1	1	2	4
41	D	Taylor Chorney	Edmonton Oilers	6	0	0	0	2
17	F	Brandon Dubinsky	New York Rangers	6	3	7	10	2
71	F	Nick Foligno	Ottawa Senators	6	3	0	3	0
18	F	TJ Galiardi	Colorado Avalanche	6	0	3	3	8
97	D	Matt Gilroy	New York Rangers	6	3	1	4	0
6	D	Andy Greene	New Jersey Devils	6	0	2	2	0
2	D	Matt Greene	Los Angeles Kings	6	0	1	1	4
20	F	Christian Hanson	Toronto Maple Leafs	6	0	1	1	2
38	D	Jack Hillen	New York Islanders	6	0	1	1	2
3	D	Jack Johnson	Los Angeles Kings	6	0	3	3	4
13	F	Tim Kennedy	Buffalo Sabres	6	1	0	1	0
19	F	Chris Kreider	Boston College	6	1	1	2	0
39	D	Mike Lundin	Tampa Bay Lightning	6	0	1	1	0
25	F	David Moss	Calgary Flames	6	1	2	3	2
23	F	Eric Nystrom	Calgary Flames	6	0	0	0	4
21	F	Kyle Okposo	New York Islanders	6	1	2	3	0
74	F	T. J. Oshie	St. Louis Blues	6	4	2	6	2
16	F	Ryan Potulny	Edmonton Oilers	6	2	2	4	0
93	D	Keith Yandle	Phoenix Coyotes	6	1	3	4	0

=== Goaltenders ===
Number	Player	Club	GP	W	L	Min	GA	GAA	SV%	SO
1	Ben Bishop	Peoria Rivermen	1	0	0	20	0	0.00	1.000	0
30	Scott Clemmensen	Florida Panthers	6	2	3	347	9	1.56	0.941	1
33	David Leggio	TPS Turku	0	–	–	–	–	–	–	–
