= Erwan Pain =

French ice hockey player

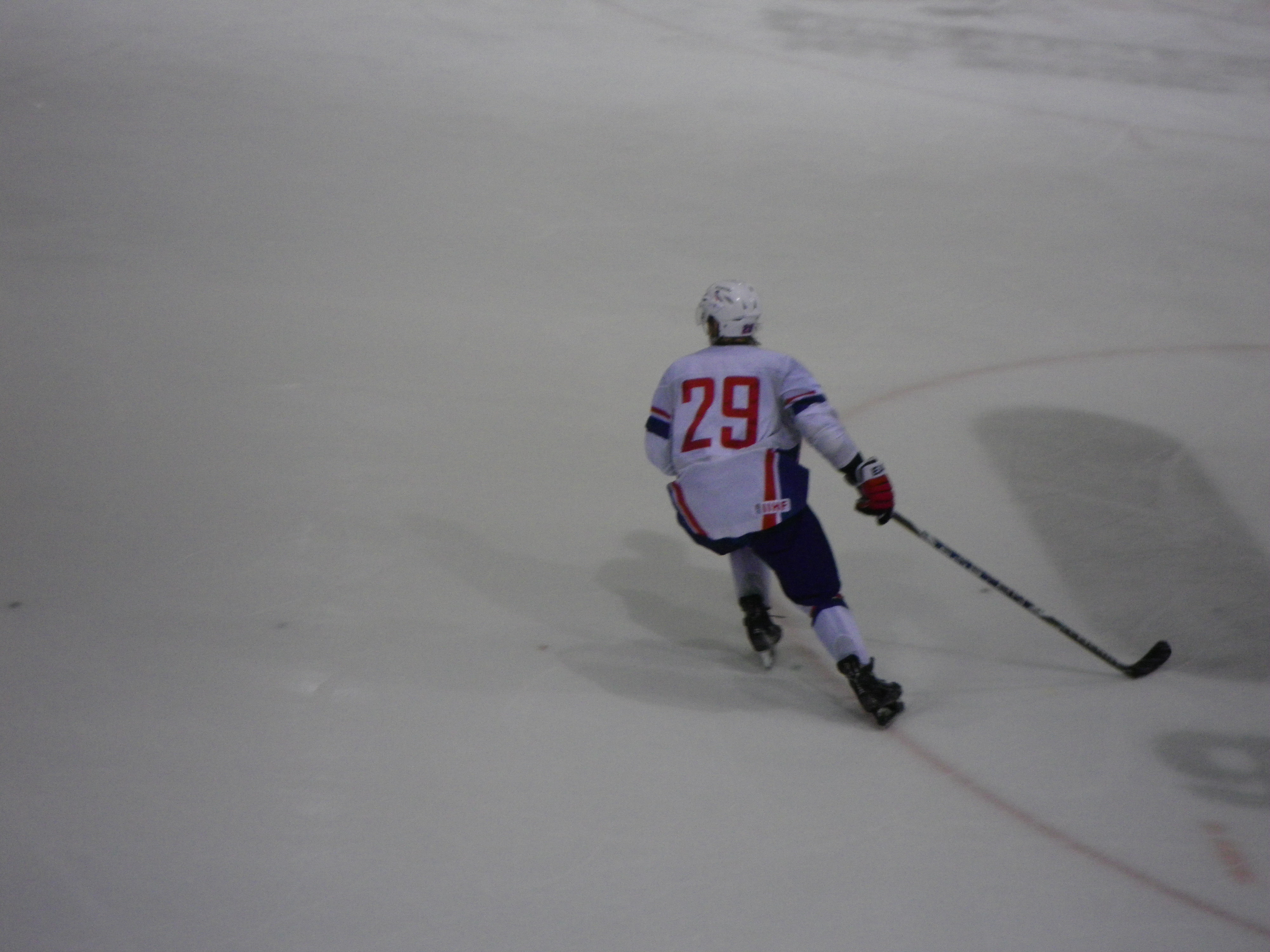
- Born: 14 February 1986 (age 39) Pointe-à-Pitre, Guadeloupe
- Position: Forward
- Shot: Left
- Played for: Chamonix; Dijon; Caen; Brest
- National team: France
- Playing career: 2004–2018

Erwan Pain (born 14 February 1986) is a French former professional ice hockey winger.

Pain played in the Ligue Magnus for Chamonix HC, Ducs de Dijon, Drakkars de Caen and Brest Albatros Hockey. He also participated at the 2010 IIHF World Championship as a member of the France national team.
