= Māris Jass =

Latvian ice hockey player

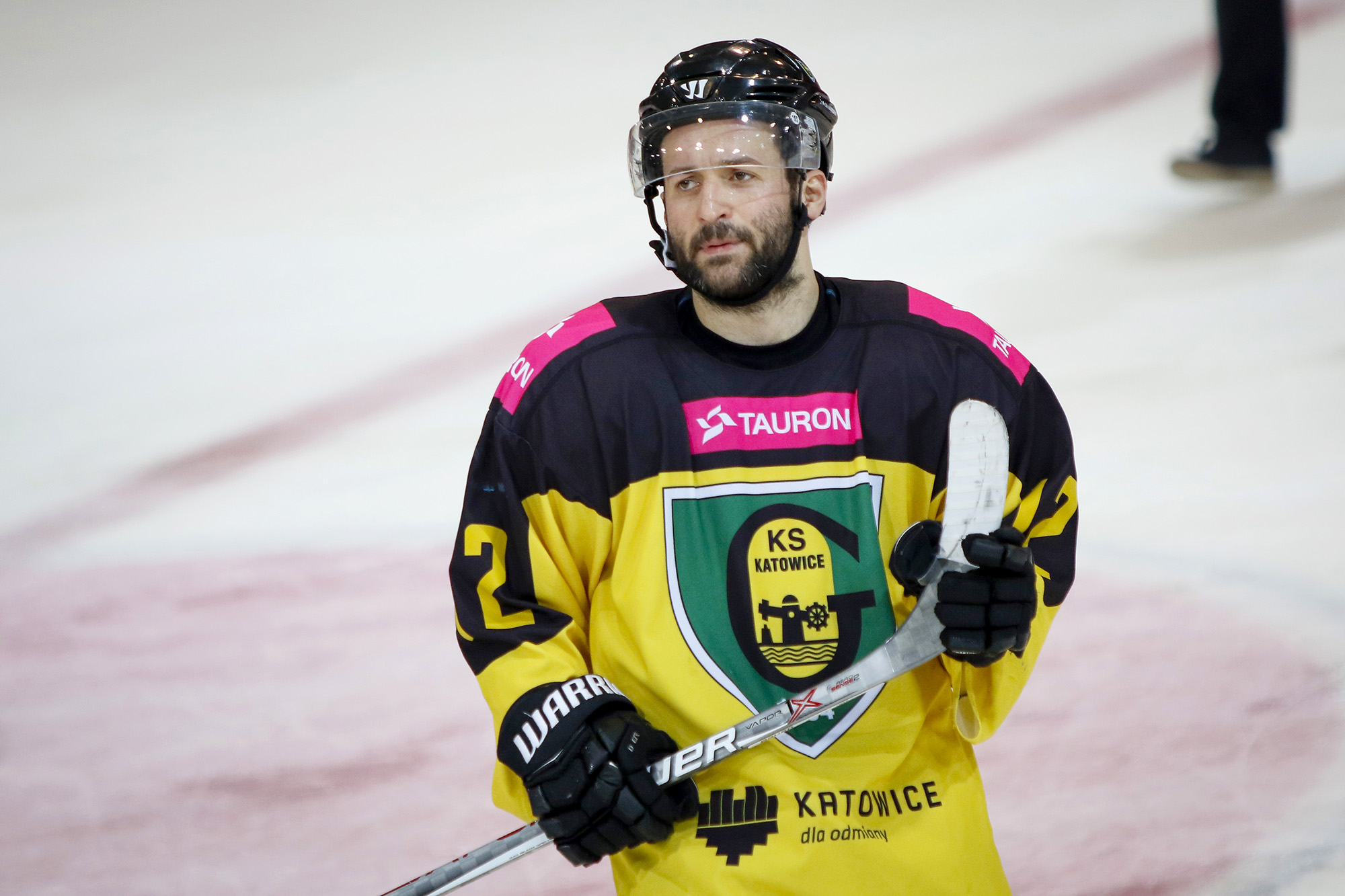
- Born: January 18, 1985 (age 40); Daugavpils, Soviet Union
- Height: 6 ft 2 in (188 cm)
- Weight: 198 lb (90 kg; 14 st 2 lb)
- Position: Defence
- Shoots: Left
- team Former teams: Free agent HK Liepājas Metalurgs; HC Lada Togliatti; HC Slavia Praha; HK Nitra; HK 36 Skalica; Neftekhimik Niznekamsk; HC Slovan Bratislava; Hannover Scorpions; HC Valpellice; Piráti Chomutov; Orli Znojmo; Dinamo Riga; HC Nové Zámky; HK Mogo; GKS Katowice
- National team: Latvia
- Playing career: 2000–present

Māris Jass (born January 18, 1985) is a Latvian professional ice hockey forward. He is currently playing a free agent having last played for GKS Katowice of the Polska Hokej Liga.

== Playing career ==
He started his career in Stalkers/Juniors of the Latvian Hockey League. After spending two seasons in the lower-tier Russian league, he spent the next six seasons with HK Liepājas Metalurgs, playing also for HC Lada Togliatti and HC Slavia Praha. In 2009-10 he played for HK Ardo Nitra of the Slovak Extraliga. Jass remained in Slovakia for 2010-11, signing with HK 36 Skalica, however in November he joined Neftekhimik Nizhnekamsk.
