= Paul Savary =

Swiss ice hockey player

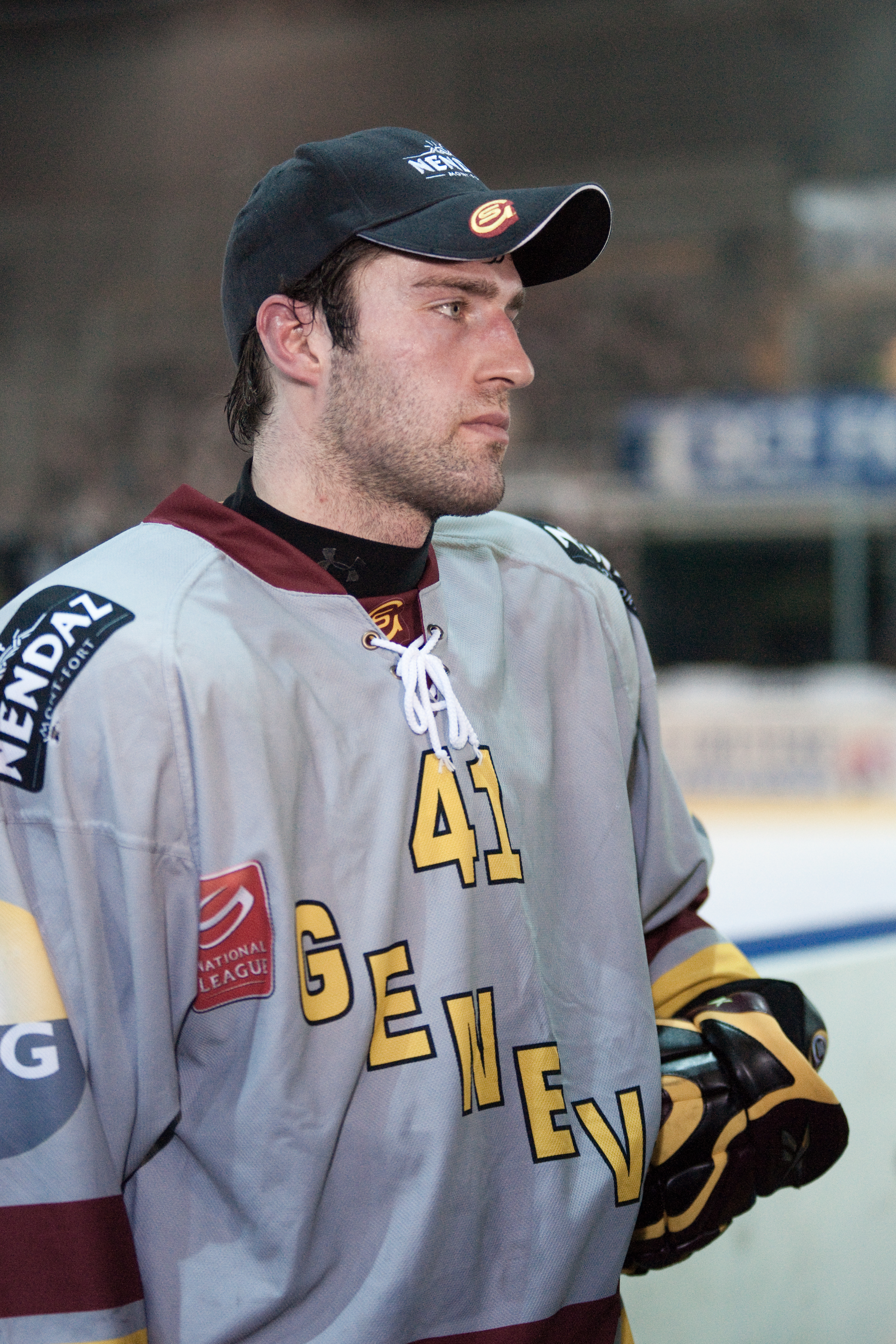
- Born: November 2, 1982 (age 42); Morges, Switzerland
- Height: 5 ft 10 in (178 cm)
- Weight: 192 lb (87 kg; 13 st 10 lb)
- Position: Forward
- Shoots: Left
- NLA team: Lausanne HC
- National team: Switzerland
- NHL draft: Undrafted
- Playing career: 1999–present

Paul Savary (born November 2, 1982) is a Swiss professional ice hockey player. He is currently playing with Lausanne HC of the Swiss National League A.

Savary participated at the 2010 IIHF World Championship as a member of the Switzerland men's national ice hockey team.
