= 2019 IIHF World Championship Group A =

Group A was one of two groups of the 2019 IIHF World Championship. The four best placed teams advanced to the playoff round, while the last placed team was relegated to Division I in 2020.

== Standings ==
Pos	Team	Pld	W	OTW	OTL	L	GF	GA	GD	Pts	Qualification or relegation
1	Canada	7	6	0	0	1	36	11	+25	18	Quarterfinals
2	Finland	7	5	0	1	1	22	11	+11	16	Quarterfinals
3	Germany	7	5	0	0	2	18	18	0	15	Quarterfinals
4	United States	7	4	1	0	2	27	15	+12	14	Quarterfinals
5	Slovakia (H)	7	3	1	0	3	28	19	+9	11	
6	Denmark	7	1	1	1	4	18	23	−5	6	
7	Great Britain	7	0	1	0	6	9	41	−32	2 (Note: France 3–4 (OT) Great Britain)	
8	France (R)	7	0	0	2	5	14	34	−20	2	Relegation to 2020 Division I A

Source: IIHF
Rules for classification: 1) points; 2) head-to-head points; 3) head-to-head goal difference; 4) head-to-head number of goals scored; 5) result against closest best-ranked team outside tied teams; 6) result against second-best ranked team outside tied teams; 7) seeding before tournament.
(H) Host; (R) Relegated

== Matches ==
All times are local (UTC+2).

=== Finland vs Canada ===
10 May 2019; 16:15	Finland	3–1 (1–1, 0–0, 2–0)	Canada	Steel Aréna, Košice; Attendance: 6,764

Game reference

Kevin Lankinen
Goalies
Matt Murray
Referees:
(Sweden) Tobias Bjork
(Czech Republic) Jan Hribik
Linesmen:
(United States) Brian Oliver
(Czech Republic) Jiří Ondráček

Kakko (Rajala, Ilomäki) – 06:47	1–0
	1–1	08:03 – Marchessault (Stone, Theodore) (PP)
Ilomäki (Rajala, Lehtonen) (PP) – 42:36	2–1
Kakko (EN) – 59:26	3–1

2 min
Penalties
4 min
27
Shots
21

=== United States vs Slovakia ===
10 May 2019; 20:15	United States	1–4 (1–1, 0–2, 0–1)	Slovakia	Steel Aréna, Košice; Attendance: 7,430

Game reference

Cory Schneider
Goalies
Patrik Rybár
Referees:
(Canada) Oliver Gouin
(Russia) Yevgeni Romasko
Linesmen:
(Russia) Gleb Lazarev
(Sweden) Andreas Malmqvist

	0–1	04:02 – Sukeľ (Studenič)
DeBrincat (Kane, Eichel) (PP) – 12:05	1–1
	1–2	21:52 – Černák (Sekera) (PP2)
	1–3	24:58 – Tatar (Pánik)
	1–4	55:54 – Krištof (Marinčin)

4 min
Penalties
4 min
26
Shots
36

=== Denmark vs France ===
11 May 2019; 12:15	Denmark	5–4 GWS (2–1, 1–3, 1–0) (OT: 0–0) (SO: 1–0)	France	Steel Aréna, Košice; Attendance: 6,190

Game reference

Sebastian Dahm
Goalies
Florian Hardy
Referees:
(Finland) Aleksi Rantala
(United States) Jeremy Tufts
Linesmen:
(Belarus) Dmitri Golyak
(Czech Republic) Jiří Ondráček

	0–1	08:55 – Bertrand (Claireaux, Hecquefeuille) (PP)
Storm – 19:06	1–1
M. Lauridsen (Storm, J. Jensen) (PP) – 19:56	2–1
	2–2	24:08 – Dame-Malka
	2–3	32:21 – Fleury (Bozon, Hecquefeuille)
	2–4	33:55 – Claireaux (Rech, Bozon) (PP)
Eller (Bødker) – 35:29	3–4
J. Jensen (Nick. Jensen, Meyer) – 46:34	4–4

Eller
N. Jensen (miss)
Bødker
Storm
Shootout
(miss) Texier
(miss) Bertrand
Rech
Treille
(miss) Fleury
8 min
Penalties
8 min
39
Shots
28

=== Germany vs Great Britain ===
11 May 2019; 16:15	Germany	3–1 (0–0, 1–0, 2–1)	Great Britain	Steel Aréna, Košice; Attendance: 6,866

Game reference

Mathias Niederberger
Goalies
Ben Bowns
Referees:
(Canada) Oliver Gouin
(Czech Republic) Jan Hribik
Linesmen:
(Sweden) Andreas Malmqvist
(Finland) Lauri Nikulainen

Seider (Seidenberg) – 39:21	1–0
	1–1	43:36 – Hammond
Ehliz (Plachta) (PP) – 50:39	2–1
Draisaitl (Plachta, Eisenschmid) – 52:03	3–1

2 min
Penalties
4 min
35
Shots
17

=== Slovakia vs Finland ===
11 May 2019; 20:15	Slovakia	2–4 (1–2, 1–0, 0–2)	Finland	Steel Aréna, Košice; Attendance: 7,421

Game reference

Marek Čiliak
Goalies
Kevin Lankinen
Referees:
(Austria) Manuel Nikolic
(Belarus) Maxim Sidorenko
Linesmen:
(Denmark) Rene Jensen
(Canada) Dustin McCrank

Černák (Sekera, Pánik) – 10:52	1–0
	1–1	14:21 – Lindbohm (Savinainen, Rajala) (PP)
	1–2	16:11 – Kakko (Mikkola, Manninen)
Marinčin (Studenič, Jaroš) – 39:20	2–2
	2–3	49:52 – Kakko (Mikkola, Manninen)
	2–4	59:45 – Kakko (Manninen, Mikkola) (EN)

6 min
Penalties
6 min
25
Shots
27

=== United States vs France ===
12 May 2019; 12:15	United States	7–1 (3–0, 2–0, 2–1)	France	Steel Aréna, Košice; Attendance: 4,960

Game reference

Thatcher Demko
Goalies
Sebastian Ylönen
Referees:
(Sweden) Tobias Bjork
(Belarus) Maxim Sidorenko
Linesmen:
(Denmark) Rene Jensen
(Finland) Lauri Nikulainen

DeBrincat (Van Riemsdyk, Kane) (PP) – 04:05	1–0
Vatrano (Eichel, Martinez) – 05:48	2–0
DeBrincat – 06:04	3–0
White (Q. Hughes, Martinez) – 33:56	4–0
Kane (Larkin, Fox) – 35:52	5–0
Kreider (Larkin) – 40:55	6–0
	6–1	46:36 – Rech (Claireaux, Bertrand)
White (Vatrano, Glendening) – 54:21	7–1

6 min
Penalties
6 min
42
Shots
24

=== Denmark vs Germany ===
12 May 2019; 16:15	Denmark	1–2 (0–0, 0–2, 1–0)	Germany	Steel Aréna, Košice; Attendance: 5,605

Game reference

Sebastian Dahm
Goalies
Mathias Niederberger
Referees:
(Austria) Manuel Nikolic
(Russia) Yevgeni Romasko
Linesmen:
(Canada) Dustin McCrank
(United States) Brian Oliver

	0–1	30:27 – Plachta (Draisaitl, Eisenschmid)
	0–2	39:49 – Tiffels (Kahun, Mauer)
Bau (Meyer, Larsen) – 50:19	1–2

14 min
Penalties
14 min
38
Shots
26

=== Great Britain vs Canada ===
12 May 2019; 20:15	Great Britain	0–8 (0–2, 0–3, 0–3)	Canada	Steel Aréna, Košice; Attendance: 4,563

Game reference

Ben Bowns
Jackson Whistle
Goalies
Carter Hart
Referees:
(Finland) Aleksi Rantala
(United States) Jeremy Tufts
Linesmen:
(Belarus) Dmitri Golyak
(Russia) Gleb Lazarev

0–1	02:42 – Joseph (Henrique, Nurse)
0–2	12:33 – Mantha (McCann, Stecher)
0–3	22:35 – Turris (Mantha)
0–4	27:05 – Strome (Marchessault, Chabot) (PP)
0–5	39:37 – Fabbro (Jost)
0–6	40:57 – Turris (Mantha)
0–7	46:46 – Couturier (Mantha, Chabot) (PP)
0–8	50:27 – Mantha (Theodore, Jost)

16 min
Penalties
4 min
12
Shots
56

=== United States vs Finland ===
13 May 2019; 16:15	United States	3–2 OT (2–1, 0–1, 0–0) (OT: 1–0)	Finland	Steel Aréna, Košice; Attendance: 7,060

Game reference

Cory Schneider
Goalies
Veini Vehviläinen
Referees:
(Czech Republic) Jan Hribik
(Russia) Yevgeni Romasko
Linesmen:
(Russia) Gleb Lazarev
(Czech Republic) Jiří Ondráček

Skjei (DeBrincat, Eichel) – 00:50	1–0
Gaudreau (Eichel) – 10:36	2–0
	2–1	19:05 – Pesonen (Manninen, Koivisto)
	2–2	39:28 – Ojamäki (Manninen, Kaski) (PP)
Larkin (Q. Hughes, Keller) – 63:47	3–2

4 min
Penalties
2 min
29
Shots
26

=== Slovakia vs Canada ===
13 May 2019; 20:15	Slovakia	5–6 (2–2, 2–3, 1–1)	Canada	Steel Aréna, Košice; Attendance: 7,420

Game reference

Patrik Rybár
Marek Čiliak
Goalies
Matt Murray
Referees:
(Sweden) Tobias Bjork
(Austria) Manuel Nikolic
Linesmen:
(Sweden) Andreas Malmqvist
(United States) Brian Oliver

Sukeľ (Studenič, Nagy) – 07:14	1–0
Liška (Jaroš, Lunter) – 08:18	2–0
	2–1	16:20 – Mantha (Turris, McCann)
	2–2	18:10 – Theodore (Mantha, Severson) (PP)
Nagy (Marinčin, Lantoši) (PP) – 21:49	3–2
Liška (Buc, Lunter) – 25:09	4–2
	4–3	27:01 – Marchessault (Chabot) (PP)
	4–4	28:43 – Cirelli (Reinhart)
	4–5	36:40 – Stecher (Turris, Severson)
Sukeľ (Marinčin) – 51:45	5–5
	5–6	59:59 – Stone (Chabot) (PP)

10 min
Penalties
22 min
31
Shots
28

=== Great Britain vs Denmark ===
14 May 2019; 16:15	Great Britain	0–9 (0–3, 0–5, 0–1)	Denmark	Steel Aréna, Košice; Attendance: 3,463

Game reference

Ben Bowns
Jackson Whistle
Goalies
Sebastian Dahm
Referees:
(Czech Republic) Martin Fraňo
(Canada) Oliver Gouin
Linesmen:
(Belarus) Dmitri Golyak
(Switzerland) Roman Kaderli

0–1	08:49 – J. Jensen (Eller, M. Lauridsen) (PP2)
0–2	09:37 – Bau (Bødker, Regin) (PP)
0–3	12:11 – Poulsen (Olesen)
0–4	21:08 – Brugisser (Bødker, Madsen)
0–5	23:17 – Eller (J. Jensen Aabo, Regin) (PP)
0–6	24:38 – N. Jensen (Eller, M. Lauridsen) (PP)
0–7	31:00 – N. Jensen (Storm, Eller)
0–8	35:44 – Poulsen (J. Jensen, Olesen)
0–9	51:53 – Poulsen (Jakobsen) (SH)

10 min
Penalties
6 min
19
Shots
42

=== Germany vs France ===
14 May 2019; 20:15	Germany	4–1 (1–0, 2–1, 1–0)	France	Steel Aréna, Košice; Attendance: 4,013

Game reference

Philipp Grubauer
Niklas Treutle
Goalies
Florian Hardy
Referees:
(Russia) Yevgeni Romasko
(Belarus) Maxim Sidorenko
Linesmen:
(Russia) Gleb Lazarev
(Russia) Dmitri Shishlo

Seider (Fauser, Hager) – 17:07	1–0
	1–1	24:10 – Fleury (Bozon, Manavian)
Plachta (Eisenschmid, J. Müller) – 33:55	2–1
Draisaitl (Kahun) – 37:54	3–1
Holzer (EN) – 59:02	4–1

10 min
Penalties
8 min
31
Shots
25

=== United States vs Great Britain ===
15 May 2019; 16:15	United States	6–3 (1–1, 3–1, 2–1)	Great Britain	Steel Aréna, Košice; Attendance: 5,510

Game reference

Thatcher Demko
Goalies
Ben Bowns
Referees:
(Sweden) Tobias Bjork
(Austria) Manuel Nikolic
Linesmen:
(Czech Republic) Miroslav Lhotský
(Sweden) Andreas Malmqvist

Van Riemsdyk (Kane, Suter) (PP) – 12:17	1–0
	1–1	15:08 – Hammond (Phillips)
Keller (Q. Hughes, Demko) (PP) – 29:07	2–1
Kreider (Eichel, Suter) – 31:20	3–1
DeBrincat (Ryan, Kane) – 37:54	4–1
	4–2	39:54 – Perlini
Kane (Kreider, Hanifin) – 41:00	5–2
Ryan (Glendening, Hanifin) – 49:10	6–2
	6–3	56:28 – Davies (Lachowicz, Billingsley)

0 min
Penalties
10 min
65
Shots
26

=== Germany vs Slovakia ===
15 May 2019; 20:15	Germany	3–2 (0–0, 1–2, 2–0)	Slovakia	Steel Aréna, Košice; Attendance: 7,440

Game reference

Mathias Niederberger
Goalies
Marek Čiliak
Referees:
(Czech Republic) Martin Fraňo
(Belarus) Maxim Sidorenko
Linesmen:
(Czech Republic) Jiří Ondráček
(Russia) Dmitri Shishlo

Michaelis (Eisenschmid) – 23:54	1–0
	1–1	28:30 – Sekera (Černák, Tatar) (PP2)
	1–2	29:55 – Hudáček (Pánik, Tatar) (PP)
Eisenschmid (Seidenberg, Kahun) (EA) – 58:08	2–2
Draisaitl (Tiffels, Kahun) – 59:33	3–2

18 min
Penalties
18 min
21
Shots
36

=== Canada vs France ===
16 May 2019; 16:15	Canada	5–2 (3–0, 0–1, 2–1)	France	Steel Aréna, Košice; Attendance: 4,519

Game reference

Carter Hart
Goalies
Henri-Corentin Buysse
Referees:
(Sweden) Linus Öhlund
(United States) Stephen Reneau
Linesmen:
(Czech Republic) Miroslav Lhotský
(Sweden) Andreas Malmqvist

Mantha (Theodore, Severson) (PP2) – 08:19	1–0
Nurse (Marchessault, Dubois) – 10:50	2–0
Cirelli (Couturier, Reinhart) – 16:15	3–0
	3–1	36:13 – Fleury (Chakiachvili, Guttig) (PP)
	3–2	42:55 – Rech
Mantha – 48:36	4–2
Stone (Marchessault) – 50:27	5–2

8 min
Penalties
10 min
46
Shots
23

=== Finland vs Denmark ===
16 May 2019; 20:15	Finland	3–1 (0–0, 2–1, 1–0)	Denmark	Steel Aréna, Košice; Attendance: 4,812

Game reference

Kevin Lankinen
Goalies
Sebastian Dahm
Referees:
(Sweden) Tobias Bjork
(Russia) Roman Gofman
Linesmen:
(United States) William Hancock
(Switzerland) Roman Kaderli

	0–1	21:49 – Madsen (Nick. Jensen, M. Lauridsen) (PP)
Kakko (Lehtonen) – 25:49	1–1
Manninen (Rajala, Lehtonen) – 34:19	2–1
Pesonen (Kakko, Ohtamaa) – 51:07	3–1

10 min
Penalties
6 min
37
Shots
26

=== France vs Slovakia ===
17 May 2019; 16:15	France	3–6 (0–2, 2–1, 1–3)	Slovakia	Steel Aréna, Košice; Attendance: 7,440

Game reference

Florian Hardy
Henri-Corentin Buysse
Goalies
Patrik Rybár
Referees:
(Russia) Roman Gofman
(Germany) Gordon Schukies
Linesmen:
(Switzerland) Roman Kaderli
(Czech Republic) Miroslav Lhotský

	0–1	13:25 – Pánik (Lantoši, Sekera) (PP)
	0–2	19:10 – Sukeľ (Fehérváry, Tatar)
	0–3	25:31 – Hudáček (Pánik, Černák) (PP)
Manavian (Hecquefeuille, Bertrand) – 32:16	1–3
Texier (Chakiachvili, Fleury) (PP) – 35:09	2–3
	2–4	40:16 – Černák (Pánik, Tatar)
	2–5	42:41 – Čajkovský (Buc) (SH)
	2–6	45:41 – Nagy (Daňo, Marinčin) (PP)
Rech (Texier, Dame-Malka) – 57:50	3–6

12 min
Penalties
4 min
20
Shots
27

=== Finland vs Great Britain ===
17 May 2019; 20:15	Finland	5–0 (0–0, 3–0, 2–0)	Great Britain	Steel Aréna, Košice; Attendance: 5,618

Game reference

Jussi Olkinuora
Goalies
Ben Bowns
Referees:
(Sweden) Linus Öhlund
(United States) Stephen Reneau
Linesmen:
(Netherlands) Joep Leermakers
(Canada) Nathan Vanoosten

Rajala (Lehtonen, Olkinuora) (PP) – 20:24	1–0
Ohtamaa (Tyrväinen, Savinainen) – 25:08	2–0
Kiviranta (Koivisto, Tyrväinen) – 34:59	3–0
Kuusela (Savinainen) (EN) – 57:27	4–0
Lehtonen (Jokiharju) (PP) – 59:49	5–0

4 min
Penalties
8 min
49
Shots
12

=== Denmark vs United States ===
18 May 2019; 12:15	Denmark	1–7 (0–4, 1–2, 0–1)	United States	Steel Aréna, Košice; Attendance: 6,184

Game reference

Simon Nielsen
Patrick Galbraith
Goalies
Cory Schneider
Referees:
(Czech Republic) Martin Fraňo
(Finland) Mikko Kaukokari
Linesmen:
(Russia) Dmitri Shishlo
(Canada) Nathan Vanoosten

	0–1	10:34 – Vatrano (Ryan, Hanifin)
	0–2	11:03 – DeBrincat (Kane, Suter) (PP)
	0–3	14:24 – Van Riemsdyk (Suter, White)
	0–4	18:49 – Kreider (J. Hughes, Eichel)
Olesen (Bau, O. Lauridsen) – 24:50	1–4
	1–5	31:55 – DeBrincat (Kane, White)
	1–6	33:17 – Larkin (Ryan)
	1–7	51:19 – Eichel (Kane, Debrincat) (PP)

8 min
Penalties
10 min
22
Shots
26

=== Canada vs Germany ===
18 May 2019; 16:15	Canada	8–1 (2–0, 2–1, 4–0)	Germany	Steel Aréna, Košice; Attendance: 6,510

Game reference

Matt Murray
Goalies
Niklas Treutle
Referees:
(Russia) Roman Gofman
(Slovakia) Peter Stano
Linesmen:
(Switzerland) Roman Kaderli
(Netherlands) Joep Leermakers

Chabot (Marchessault, Strome) (PP) – 02:01	1–0
Stone (Severson, Nurse) – 16:43	2–0
Stone (Strome, Marchessault) (PP) – 26:02	3–0
	3–1	38:01 – Ehliz (Eisenschmid, Seidenberg) (PP)
Stone (Dubois) – 38:49	4–1
Mantha – 43:01	5–1
Mantha (Turris) – 44:55	6–1
Reinhart (Strome) – 45:28	7–1
Cirelli (Joseph) (SH) – 53:10	8–1

12 min
Penalties
18 min
49
Shots
16

=== Great Britain vs Slovakia ===
18 May 2019; 20:15	Great Britain	1–7 (1–3, 0–3, 0–1)	Slovakia	Steel Aréna, Košice; Attendance: 7,440

Game reference

Ben Bowns
Jackson Whistle
Goalies
Denis Godla
Referees:
(Canada) Brett Iverson
(United States) Stephen Reneau
Linesmen:
(United States) William Hancock
(Czech Republic) Miroslav Lhotský

	0–1	02:04 – Sekera (Buc)
	0–2	02:25 – Tatar
	0–3	09:02 – Marinčin (Krištof) (PP)
Hammond (Richardson) – 17:44	1–3
	1–4	24:33 – Čajkovský (Pánik)
	1–5	29:09 – Studenič (Krištof)
	1–6	35:11 – Sukel (Liška, Koch) (SH)
	1–7	58:00 – Bondra (Koch, Nagy)

4 min
Penalties
4 min
17
Shots
38

=== Germany vs United States ===
19 May 2019; 16:15	Germany	1–3 (1–1, 0–0, 0–2)	United States	Steel Aréna, Košice; Attendance: 6,293

Game reference

Mathias Niederberger
Goalies
Cory Schneider
Referees:
(Sweden) Linus Öhlund
(Slovakia) Peter Stano
Linesmen:
(Finland) Hannu Sormunen
(Canada) Nathan Vanoosten

Tiffels (Draisaitl) – 11:55	1–0
	1–1	13:47 – Van Riemsdyk (Keller, Martinez)
	1–2	50:03 – Larkin (Van Riemsdyk, Martinez)
	1–3	56:15 – Eichel (Kane, Suter) (PP)

2 min
Penalties
4 min
25
Shots
29

=== France vs Finland ===
19 May 2019; 20:15	France	0–3 (0–1, 0–1, 0–1)	Finland	Steel Aréna, Košice; Attendance: 4,682

Game reference

Florian Hardy
Goalies
Kevin Lankinen
Referees:
(Czech Republic) Martin Fraňo
(Germany) Gordon Schukies
Linesmen:
(United Kingdom) Andrew Dalton
(Russia) Dmitri Shishlo

0–1	09:24 – Kiviranta (Lindbohm, Tyrväinen)
0–2	21:51 – Mikkola (Pesonen, Kaski)
0–3	52:31 – Sallinen (Savinainen, Kuusela)

14 min
Penalties
8 min
21
Shots
47

=== France vs Great Britain ===
20 May 2019; 16:15	France	3–4 OT (0–0, 3–2, 0–1) (OT: 0–1)	Great Britain	Steel Aréna, Košice; Attendance: 7,440

Game reference

Florian Hardy
Goalies
Ben Bowns
Referees:
(Finland) Mikko Kaukokari
(Slovakia) Peter Stano
Linesmen:
(Switzerland) Roman Kaderli
(Netherlands) Joep Leermakers

Rech (Manavian, Bozon) – 23:36	1–0
Treille (Chakiachvili, Texier) – 27:31	2–0
Rech (Claireaux) – 27:37	3–0
	3–1	34:59 – Dowd (O'Connor)
	3–2	38:04 – Hammond (O’Connor, Phillips)
	3–3	45:16 – Farmer (Phillips, O’Connor)
	3–4	62:03 – Davies (Phillips)

4 min
Penalties
4 min
36
Shots
30

=== Canada vs Denmark ===
20 May 2019; 20:15	Canada	5–0 (3–0, 1–0, 1–0)	Denmark	Steel Aréna, Košice; Attendance: 4,665

Game reference

Carter Hart
Mackenzie Blackwood
Goalies
Patrick Galbraith
Referees:
(Sweden) Linus Öhlund
(Germany) Gordon Schukies
Linesmen:
(United Kingdom) Andrew Dalton
(United States) William Hancock

Dubois (Marchessault, Stone) – 02:00	1–0
McCann (Turris) – 06:06	2–0
Marchessault (Severson, Stone) – 08:23	3–0
Reinhart (Couturier, Chabot) (PP) – 33:53	4–0
Reinhart (Myers, Cirelli) – 44:34	5–0

8 min
Penalties
6 min
34
Shots
24

=== Finland vs Germany ===
21 May 2019; 12:15	Finland	2–4 (1–1, 1–1, 0–2)	Germany	Steel Aréna, Košice; Attendance: 6,685

Game reference

Kevin Lankinen
Goalies
Philipp Grubauer
Referees:
(Russia) Roman Gofman
(United States) Stephen Reneau
Linesmen:
(United States) William Hancock
(Canada) Nathan Vanoosten

Pesonen (Lehtonen, Jokiharju) (PP) – 15:05	1–0
	1–1	17:04 – Michaelis (Plachta, Eisenschmid)
Tyrväinen (Ojamäki) – 24:07	2–1
	2–2	33:13 – Kahun (Draisaitl)
	2–3	44:46 – Draisaitl (Pföderl) (PP)
	2–4	59:00 – Draisaitl (ENG)

4 min
Penalties
8 min
41
Shots
21

=== Slovakia vs Denmark ===
21 May 2019; 16:15	Slovakia	2–1 GWS (0–0, 1–0, 0–1) (OT: 0–0) (SO: 1–0)	Denmark	Steel Aréna, Košice; Attendance: 7,440

Game reference
Denis Godla	Goalies	Sebastian Dahm	Referees: (Canada) Brett Iverson (Sweden) Linus Öhlund; Linesmen: (Netherlands) Joep Leermakers (Finland) Hannu Sormunen
Marinčin (Studenič, Nagy) – 39:04 / 1–0; / 1–1 / 46:41 – Bødker (Russell, Jensen Aabo) (PP2)			Referees: (Canada) Brett Iverson (Sweden) Linus Öhlund; Linesmen: (Netherlands) Joep Leermakers (Finland) Hannu Sormunen
Studenič (miss); Sukeľ (miss); Nagy; Tatar (miss); Krištof	Shootout	(miss) Bødker; (miss) Regin; (miss) Jensen; (miss) Storm	Referees: (Canada) Brett Iverson (Sweden) Linus Öhlund; Linesmen: (Netherlands) Joep Leermakers (Finland) Hannu Sormunen
10 min	Penalties	4 min	Referees: (Canada) Brett Iverson (Sweden) Linus Öhlund; Linesmen: (Netherlands) Joep Leermakers (Finland) Hannu Sormunen
29	Shots	14	Referees: (Canada) Brett Iverson (Sweden) Linus Öhlund; Linesmen: (Netherlands) Joep Leermakers (Finland) Hannu Sormunen

=== Canada vs United States ===
21 May 2019; 20:15	Canada	3–0 (2–0, 1–0, 0–0)	United States	Steel Aréna, Košice; Attendance: 7,440

Game reference

Matt Murray
Goalies
Cory Schneider
Referees:
(Czech Republic) Martin Fraňo
(Finland) Mikko Kaukokari
Linesmen:
(Czech Republic) Miroslav Lhotský
(Russia) Dmitri Shishlo

Dubois (Stone) – 01:49	1–0
Turris (Mantha) – 08:02	2–0
McCann (Turris, Fabbro) – 35:59	3–0

14 min
Penalties
4 min
36
Shots
28
