= 2019 IIHF World Championship final =

Ice hockey match

| | 1 | 2 | 3 | Total |
|---|---|---|---|---|
| Finland | 0 | 1 | 2 | 3 |
| Canada | 1 | 0 | 0 | 1 |
- Date: 26 May 2019
- Arena: Ondrej Nepela Arena
- City: Bratislava
- Attendance: 9,085

The 2019 IIHF World Championship final was played at the Ondrej Nepela Arena in Bratislava, Slovakia on 26 May 2019 between Canada and Finland. It was the fourth final between the two teams with Canada having won the three previous finals, most recently in 2016.

Finland defeated Canada 3–1 to win their third title.

== Road to the final ==
Canada
Round
Finland
Opponent
Result
Preliminary round
Opponent
Result
Finland
1–3
Game 1
Canada
3–1
Great Britain
8–0
Game 2
Slovakia
4–2
Slovakia
6–5
Game 3
United States
2–3 (OT)
France
5–2
Game 4
Denmark
3–1
Germany
8–1
Game 5
Great Britain
5–0
Denmark
5–0
Game 6
France
3–0
United States
3–0
Game 7
Germany
2–4

| Pos | Team | Pld | Pts |
|---|---|---|---|
| 1 | Canada | 7 | 18 |
| 2 | Finland | 7 | 16 |
| 3 | Germany | 7 | 15 |
| 4 | United States | 7 | 14 |
| 5 | Slovakia (H) | 7 | 11 |
| 6 | Denmark | 7 | 6 |
| 7 | Great Britain | 7 | 2 |
| 8 | France (R) | 7 | 2 |

Source: IIHF
(H) Host; (R) Relegated
Preliminary

| Pos | Team | Pld | Pts |
|---|---|---|---|
| 1 | Canada | 7 | 18 |
| 2 | Finland | 7 | 16 |
| 3 | Germany | 7 | 15 |
| 4 | United States | 7 | 14 |
| 5 | Slovakia (H) | 7 | 11 |
| 6 | Denmark | 7 | 6 |
| 7 | Great Britain | 7 | 2 |
| 8 | France (R) | 7 | 2 |

Source: IIHF
(H) Host; (R) Relegated
Opponent
Result
Playoff
Opponent
Result
Switzerland
3–2 (OT)
Quarterfinals
Sweden
5–4 (OT)
Czech Republic
5–1
Semifinals
Russia
1–0

== Match ==
The first period was mainly filled with penalties, as there were multiple fouls throughout the period. This gave Canada several power plays, but did not result in a goal. Nevertheless, the first goal of the match was scored by Shea Theodore for the Canadian team after getting a loose puck, which was the only goal of the period. Early in the second period, Finland earned a power play, which led to the game-tying goal from team captain Marko Anttila.

In the third period, Anttila scored another goal for Finland to make it 2–1. With five minutes remaining, Harri Pesonen scored another goal for the Finnish team to make it a 3–1 lead, which stood until the end.

Finland won the title for the third time, which was also their second win in Slovakia, the first being in 2011.

| 26 May 2019; 20:15 (UTC+2) | Canada | 1–3 (1–0, 0–1, 0–2) | Finland | Ondrej Nepela Arena, Bratislava; Attendance: 9,085 |

Game reference

Matt Murray
Goalies
Kevin Lankinen
Referees:
(Sweden) Tobias Björk
(United States) Jeremy Tufts
Linesmen:
(Russia) Gleb Lazarev
(Czech Republic) Miroslav Lhotský

| Theodore (Mantha, McCann) – 10:02 | 1–0 |
| | 1–1 | 22:35 – Anttila (Manninen, Ojamäki) (PP) |
| | 1–2 | 42:35 – Anttila (Savinainen) |
| | 1–3 | 55:54 – Pesonen (Tyrväinen, Hakanpää) |

6 min
Penalties
8 min
44
Shots
22
