= Carter Hart =

Canadian ice hockey player (born 1998)

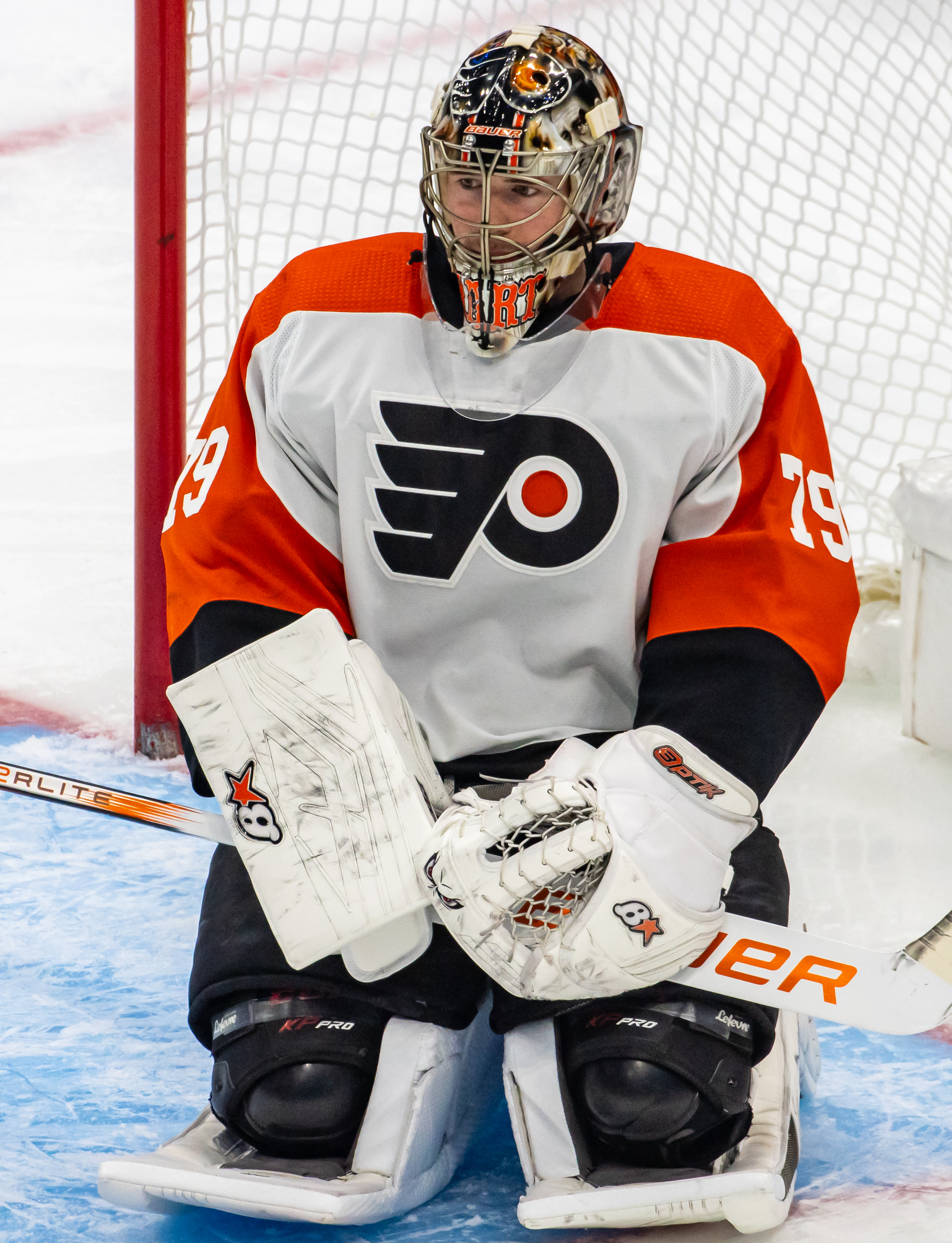
- Hart with the Philadelphia Flyers in 2023
- Born: August 13, 1998 (age 28) Sherwood Park, Alberta, Canada
- Height: 6 ft 2 in (188 cm)
- Weight: 196 lb (89 kg; 14 st 0 lb)
- Position: Goaltender
- Catches: Left
- NHL team Former teams: Vegas Golden Knights; Philadelphia Flyers
- National team: Canada
- NHL draft: 48th overall, 2016; Philadelphia Flyers
- Playing career: 2018–present

Carter John Hart (born August 13, 1998) is a Canadian professional ice hockey player who is a goaltender for the Vegas Golden Knights of the National Hockey League (NHL). He was drafted by the Philadelphia Flyers in the second round (48th overall) of the 2016 NHL entry draft; he was the highest-drafted goaltender that year.

In Hart's time with the Everett Silvertips of the Western Hockey League (WHL), he was a three-time winner of the Del Wilson Trophy, a two-time CHL Goaltender of the Year, and a recipient of the Four Broncos Memorial Trophy.

On December 18, 2018, Hart became the youngest goaltender in Flyers history to win his NHL debut, and in 2020, he became the youngest Flyers goaltender to win a postseason game.

Internationally, Hart has represented Canada at several international tournaments, including the Ivan Hlinka Memorial Tournament, IIHF World U20 Championship, and Ice Hockey World Championships.

Beginning in early 2024, Hart was placed on an indefinite leave of absence from hockey after he was charged with sexual assault, which was alleged to have occurred with members of Canada's 2018 World Junior team as part of the Hockey Canada sexual assault scandal; he was acquitted of the charge in 2025. Upon reaching restricted free agency that offseason, the Flyers did not match his minimum qualifying salary offer and thereby released him. On October 16, 2025, the Vegas Golden Knights signed him to a professional tryout and converted it to a two-year contract on October 24.

== Early life ==
Hart was born on August 13, 1998, in Sherwood Park, Alberta, to Shauna and John Hart. He originally wanted to be a forward like his father, who played for the Northern Alberta Institute of Technology Ooks, but found that he enjoyed making saves more than scoring goals.

His parents hired sport psychologist John Stevenson, who previously worked with NHL player Braden Holtby, as a goaltender coach when Hart was ten years old. From a young age, he idolized goaltender Carey Price of the Montreal Canadiens, later admitting to be star struck the first time he faced Price in an NHL game.

== Playing career ==
=== Junior ===
Growing up in Alberta, Hart played minor hockey with the Sherwood Park Squires of the Alberta Minor Midget AAA Hockey League. He won Most Valuable Player (MVP) and Top Goaltender awards at the end of the 2013–14 AMMHL season, with a 1.92 goals against average (GAA) and a .937 save percentage (SV%).

After Hart was selected in the eighth round (158th overall) in the 2013 WHL Bantam Draft, he signed with the Everett Silvertips of the Western Hockey League (WHL) on February 12, 2014. He made his career start at age 16 in the 2014–15 WHL season opener, recording a 26-save shutout against the Seattle Thunderbirds. After displacing starting goaltender Austin Lotz in March 2015, Hart finished his rookie season with an 18–5–2–3 record and the lowest GAA (2.29) and second-highest save percentage (.915) in the WHL. He started every game in the Silvertips' playoff series (including their first-round, triple-overtime win against the Spokane Chiefs), and finished the series with a 2.28 GAA and .929 SV%.

Hart had another successful year in his second season with the Silvertips, recording six shutouts in 21 games and finishing the season with the most wins in the WHL (a 35–23–1–3 record) and a 2.14 GAA. He received the CHL Goaltender of the Year award, the Del Wilson Trophy for the top goaltender in the WHL, and MVP for the Silvertips organization. Hart was named a WHL West First Team All-Star for the season.

Before the 2016 NHL entry draft, Hart was considered a top goaltender prospect. The NHL Central Scouting Bureau named him the top available North American goaltender in its 2016 midterm rankings, and second in its final ratings. He appeared in the 2016 CHL/NHL Top Prospects Game, playing for Team Orr. Hart was drafted in the second round, 48th overall, by the Philadelphia Flyers of the National Hockey League (NHL) – the first goaltender selected in 2016 – and signed an entry-level contract with the Flyers organization on October 2 of that year. He returned to the Silvertips for the 2016–17 WHL season, winning back-to-back CHL Goaltender of the Week awards in November 2016. Hart finished the season with a 32–11–6–2 record and led the WHL in goals against average (1.99), save percentage (.927) and shutouts (9), again receiving the Silvertips' MVP award and the Del Wilson Trophy.

Hart missed the first month of his 2017–18 WHL season after contracting mononucleosis, which fatigued him and made him lose 20 pounds (9.1 kg). He had played only two games, a win against the Kelowna Rockets on September 29 and a loss to the Tri-City Americans the following day, when he was diagnosed. Hart returned in November and soon recorded his 21st career shutout against the Prince Albert Raiders, tying Leland Irving for the most shutout games in Silvertips history. He recorded his 26th career shutout (against the Vancouver Giants) on February 11, 2018, tying Tyson Sexsmith for the most career WHL shutouts. Hart finished the season with a 31–6–1–3 record, a 1.60 GAA, a 0.947 SV%, and seven shutouts. In addition to receiving the Silvertips MVP award, and the Del Wilson Trophy for the third consecutive year, he was named CHL Goaltender of the Year for the 2017–18 season – the first goaltender in league history to receive the award twice. Hart received the Everett Silvertips Community Relations Award, and the Four Broncos Memorial Trophy, awarded to the WHL Player of the Year. He ended his WHL career with an overall 116–46–19 record, a 2.01 GAA, a .927 save percentage, and 26 shutouts.

=== Professional ===
==== Philadelphia Flyers (2018–2024) ====
Hart began the 2018–19 season with the Lehigh Valley Phantoms, the Flyers' American Hockey League (AHL) affiliate, earning his first professional-career shutout on December 10, 2018, in a 1–0 win against the Hershey Bears. His AHL career was short-lived, since he was recalled by the Flyers a week later after goaltender Anthony Stolarz was placed on the injured reserve list. Hart was to be one of eight goaltenders used by the Philadelphia Flyers in the 2018–19 NHL season, a league record.

He made his NHL debut on December 18 in a 3–2 victory over the Detroit Red Wings, the youngest goaltender since Carey Price to win his NHL debut and the youngest in Flyers history. Recording his fourth straight NHL win against the Winnipeg Jets on January 28, Hart was the first NHL player since Steve Mason to have four consecutive victories as a starting goaltender before age 21. He was named the NHL Rookie of the Month on January 29 with a 6–2–1 record, a 2.33 GAA and a .931 SV%, and was named the Second Star of the Week for the week of February 4 with a 3–0–0 record and a six-game winning streak.

Hart began the Flyers' 2019–20 season training camp weighing 191 pounds (87 kg), 11 pounds (5.0 kg) more than the previous season. On October 9, after defeating the New Jersey Devils in a 4–0 home opener, he was the youngest goaltender in Flyers history to record a shutout at the age of 21 years and 57 days. After straining a lower right abdominal muscle during practice on January 15, Hart missed nine consecutive games before returning on February 10 in a 4–1 victory against the Florida Panthers. When the season was suspended on March 12 due to the COVID-19 pandemic in North America, Hart had a 24–13–3 record, a 2.42 GAA, and a .914 SV%.

When the NHL resumed for the 2020 Stanley Cup playoffs in Toronto, Hart was one of 31 Flyers selected for the bubble. He made his postseason debut on August 2, winning a round-robin game against the Boston Bruins. Hart made 34 saves in the 4–1 victory, becoming the youngest Flyers goaltender to win a postseason game. He posted back-to-back playoff shoutouts on August 16 and 18 against the Montreal Canadiens, becoming the second-youngest goaltender in NHL history to do so. On August 21, Hart saved 31 shots to give Philadelphia the series win against the Canadiens. The Flyers lost the second Eastern Conference round to the New York Islanders, with Hart taking the 4–0 game-seven loss to end the series on September 3, 2020.

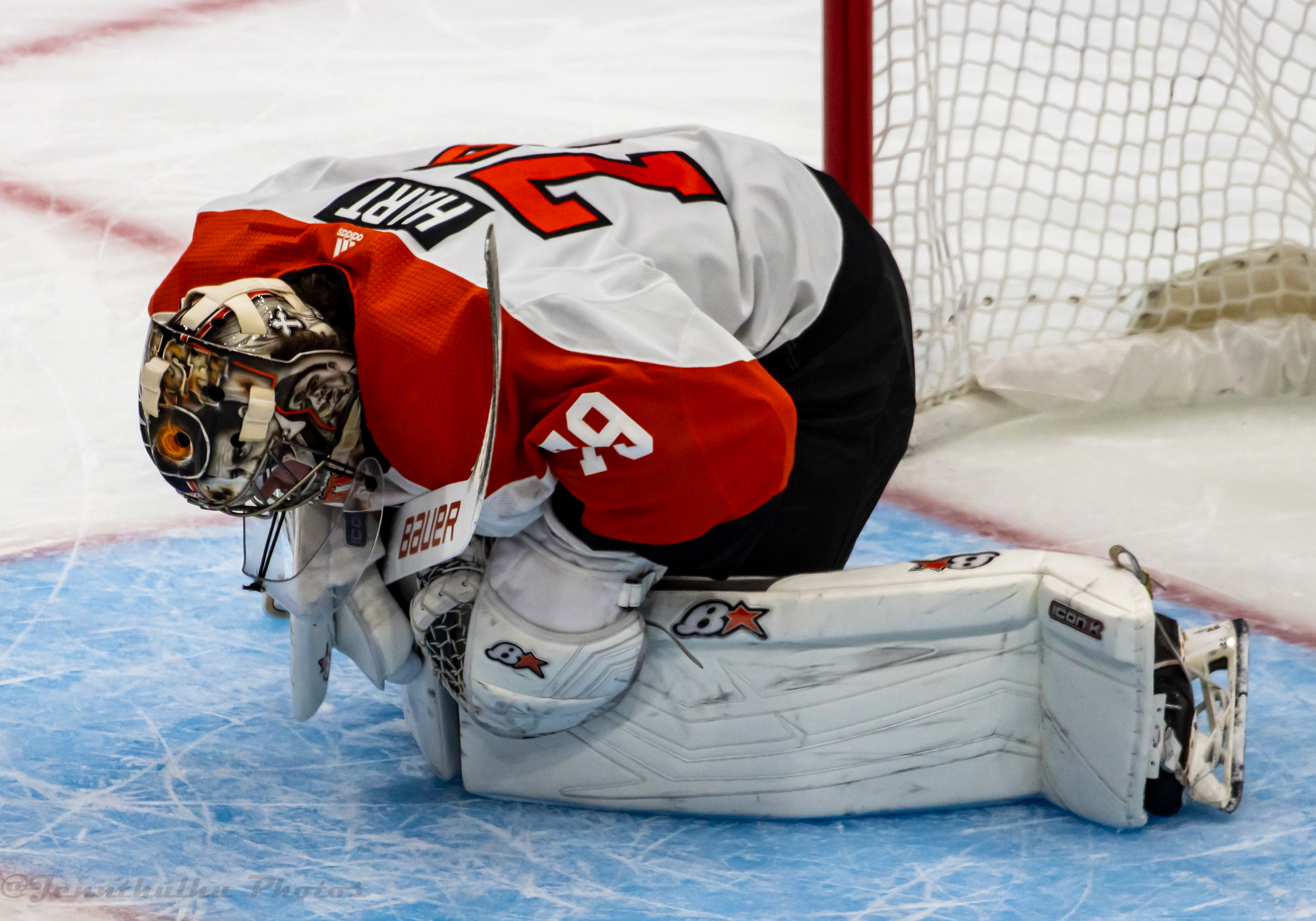
Hart stretching during a game in 2023

He struggled at the beginning of the 2020–21 season, allowing four or more goals in three consecutive starts for the first time in his career. After a 6–1 loss against the Bruins on January 23, Hart broke his stick on the net before he stormed off the ice. He later apologized, calling the outburst "unprofessional" and a decision made in "the heat of the moment." Hart was particularly bedeviled by the Bruins, to whom he gave up three goals in under two minutes in an eventual 7–3 loss at the NHL Outdoors at Lake Tahoe game on February 21. After a March 25 game against the New York Rangers, Flyers coach Alain Vigneault asked Hart to take an eight-day "reset" to focus on improving his game. He returned on April 3 in a 3–2 shootout loss against the Islanders. After being scratched on April 17, the Flyers shut Hart down for the season on April 29 due to a sprained medial collateral ligament in his left knee. He finished the season 9–11–5 with a 3.67 GAA and .877 SV%.

Hart, a restricted free agent during the 2021 offseason, signed a three-year contract extension with an average annual value of $3.979 million on August 9. He recorded his first shutout of the season on November 2, making 29 saves in a 3–0 victory over the Arizona Coyotes. On December 27, 2021, having last played on December 16 before feeling ill, then briefly returning to the practice roster after clearing an initial COVID-19 screening test, Hart tested positive and was officially placed on the NHL's COVID-19 protocol list; he returned to action in a game on January 4, 2022.

On January 23, 2024, the Flyers announced that Hart would take an indefinite leave from the team for personal reasons. Hart did not return to the Flyers for the remainder of the season. Hart was an impending restricted free agent, and the Flyers did not tender him a qualifying offer, making him an unrestricted free agent on July 1, 2024.

==== Vegas Golden Knights (2025–present) ====
On September 11, 2025, the NHL announced Hart would be eligible to sign a contract on October 15, and would be eligible to return to play on December 1. Just over a month later, on October 16, Hart signed a professional tryout agreement with the Vegas Golden Knights; he was then officially signed to a two-year contract by the team on October 24. He was assigned to their AHL affiliate, the Henderson Silver Knights, for a conditioning stint on November 15. Following a three-game stint with Henderson in which he recorded a 1–2–0 record with a 3.07 goals against average and .839 save percentage, Hart was recalled to Vegas' roster on November 30. Hart debuted for Vegas on December 2, stopping 27 shots in regulation and overtime and 3 of 4 in a shootout as the Golden Knights defeated the Chicago Blackhawks 4–3. On January 8, 2026, Hart suffered a lower-body injury early in a game against the Columbus Blue Jackets, leaving approximately eight and a half minutes into the first period. He was subsequently placed on injured reserve on January 15. After missing 33 games due to the injury, Hart was activated from injured reserve on April 2. In his return against the Calgary Flames that night, Hart stopped 19 of 22 shots en route to a 6–3 victory.

Hart started all 22 games during the 2026 Stanley Cup playoffs without recording a single shutout, surpassing the previous NHL record for starts without a shutout in a single postseason by two games. After the Golden Knights advanced to the 2026 Stanley Cup Final against the Carolina Hurricanes, Hart became the first goaltender in NHL history to give up 4 or more goals during the first five games of the Final.

== Playing style ==
In a 2016 scouting report, NHL Central Scouting noted Hart's "focused and consistent technique with positioning and crease management" and his "strong lateral movement while keeping his body controlled." He uses a reactive-blocking technique rather than the butterfly style which he believes many goaltenders employ: "I'm not a guy who just drops right down, squats and hopes it hits you."

Attention has been paid to the mental aspects of Hart's performance. Part of his work with Stevenson has involved improving his focus and optimism before a game, and he has been praised by Silvertips head coach Dennis Williams for his "calm, cool and collected" demeanor on the ice; according to Flyers teammate James van Riemsdyk, his temperament on the ice is "the best quality I think he has." Hart practices vision training to increase his visual acuity and perception and better process an approaching puck. He also juggles and uses concentration grids, a technique which involves crossing off a randomized grid of numbers in order from one to 100, to improve his focus. Hart admits being a perfectionist, and hopes to become the NHL's best goaltender.

== International play ==
Medal record

Ice hockey

Representing Canada

World Championships
Silver medal – second place	2019 Slovakia	

World Junior Championships
Gold medal – first place	2018 New York	
Silver medal – second place	2017 Canada	

Ivan Hlinka Memorial Tournament
Gold medal – first place	2015 Czech Republic/Slovakia	

Hart and the Peterborough Petes' Dylan Wells were selected as goaltenders for Hockey Canada at the 2015 Ivan Hlinka Memorial Tournament. Hart began the tournament with 15 saves against the Czech Republic for a 3–1 victory. He made 13 saves in his next starting appearance: a 9–2 win against Switzerland to take Canada to the semifinals. Canada went on to defeat Sweden in the gold-medal match.

Hart was next selected to represent Canada at the 2017 World Junior Ice Hockey Championships. Brought in as the starting goaltender, he was sidelined after allowing three goals in 17 shots by Russia and was called up again only when Connor Ingram gave up two goals in three shots by Sweden. After making 31 saves in the gold-medal game against the United States, Hart gave up a shootout goal by Troy Terry to give Canada the silver medal. He was again chosen, with Michael DiPietro this time, for the 2018 World Junior Ice Hockey Championships. After recording a 23-save shutout against the Czech Republic in pre-tournament play, Hart was named Canada's starter. Canada defeated Sweden in the gold-medal match, and Hart ended the tournament with a 5–0–1 record, tying the Canadian world junior career record at 8–0–2.

Hart and fellow Flyer Sean Couturier were named to Canada's roster for the 2019 IIHF World Championship, coached by recently appointed Flyers head coach Alain Vigneault. He served as backup goaltender to Matt Murray. Hart recorded 22 saves in 50 minutes in his first game of the championship, against Denmark in the Group A preliminary round, combining with Mackenzie Blackwood for the shutout. Canada advanced to the gold-medal game, losing 3–1 to Finland for the silver medal.

On March 27, 2023, as part of the development of the sexual assault scandal, Hockey Canada announced that every member of Canada's 2018 World Junior team would be ineligible for all international competitions until investigations were complete. On August 12, 2026, Hockey Canada updated its suspensions and stated that due to a breach of conduct, Hart would be suspended from international competitions through November 10, 2027.

== Personal life ==
On January 30, 2024, Hart, along with Dillon Dubé, Cal Foote, Alex Formenton and Michael McLeod, was ordered to surrender to London, Ontario police to be charged with sexual assault in connection with the 2018 Hockey Canada sexual assault scandal, where Hockey Canada had paid an undisclosed settlement to the alleged victim. On February 5, 2024, the London Police Service announced that Hart had been charged with one count of sexual assault. Hart was the only player who chose to testify during the trial, where he recounted receiving oral sex from the alleged victim after coming to the room when offered a threesome by McLeod in the teams group chat. He also admitted to being highly intoxicated the night of the reported assault. The trial proceedings were declared a mistrial twice, before the jury was dismissed and the justice adjudicated the case herself. On July 24, 2025, Ontario Superior Court Justice Maria Carroccia acquitted Hart and the four other players stating, she did not find the victims evidence "credible or reliable", and that "the Crown cannot meet its onus on any of the counts". Prior to game one of the 2026 Stanley Cup Final, Hart's pre-game press conference was cut short by a member of the Golden Knights communication team, when a reporter questioned him about the trial in a follow-up to his answer about learning and growth since playing with Vegas and following his 20-month suspension. During the 2026 Stanley Cup Final series against the Carolina Hurricanes, fans of the Hurricanes led chants of "No means No" directed at Hart.

In May 2026, during the 2026 playoffs Hart was recorded and photographed wearing a "Free Alberta" shirt, causing online backlash for wearing the controversial slogan, as recent polls indicate about two thirds of respondents oppose the idea of independence.

== Career statistics ==
=== Regular season and playoffs ===
			Regular season									Playoffs
Season	Team	League	GP	W	L	OTL	MIN	GA	SO	GAA	SV%	GP	W	L	MIN	GA	SO	GAA	SV%
2013–14	Everett Silvertips	WHL	2	0	1	1	103	6	0	3.49	.893	—	—	—	—	—	—	—	—
2014–15	Everett Silvertips	WHL	30	18	5	5	1,648	63	4	2.29	.915	11	5	6	710	27	0	2.28	.929
2015–16	Everett Silvertips	WHL	63	35	23	4	3,693	132	6	2.14	.918	6	2	4	352	14	1	2.39	.929
2016–17	Everett Silvertips	WHL	54	32	11	8	3,078	102	9	1.99	.927	10	4	6	691	28	1	2.43	.908
2017–18	Everett Silvertips	WHL	41	31	6	1	2,437	65	7	1.60	.947	22	14	8	1,325	53	2	2.40	.921
2018–19	Lehigh Valley Phantoms	AHL	18	9	6	1	1,005	51	1	3.05	.902	—	—	—	—	—	—	—	—
2018–19	Philadelphia Flyers	NHL	31	16	13	1	1,717	81	0	2.83	.917	—	—	—	—	—	—	—	—
2019–20	Philadelphia Flyers	NHL	43	24	13	3	2,356	95	1	2.42	.914	14	9	5	860	32	2	2.23	.926
2020–21	Philadelphia Flyers	NHL	27	9	11	5	1,456	89	1	3.67	.877	—	—	—	—	—	—	—	—
2021–22	Philadelphia Flyers	NHL	45	13	24	7	2,604	137	1	3.16	.905	—	—	—	—	—	—	—	—
2022–23	Philadelphia Flyers	NHL	55	22	23	10	3,164	155	2	2.94	.907	—	—	—	—	—	—	—	—
2023–24	Philadelphia Flyers	NHL	26	12	9	3	1,455	68	1	2.80	.906	—	—	—	—	—	—	—	—
2025–26	Vegas Golden Knights	NHL	18	11	3	3	1,020	46	0	2.71	.891	22	14	8	1,380	59	0	2.56	.909
NHL totals			245	107	96	32	13,771	671	6	2.92	.905	36	23	13	2,240	91	2	2.44	.916

=== International ===
Year	Team	Event	Result	GP	W	L	OT	MIN	GA	SO	GAA	SV%
2015	Canada	IH18	1st place, gold medalist(s)	2	2	0	0	120	3	0	1.50	.903
2017	Canada	WJC	2nd place, silver medalist(s)	4	3	1	0	252	10	0	2.38	.906
2018	Canada	WJC	1st place, gold medalist(s)	6	5	1	0	365	11	1	1.81	.930
2019	Canada	WC	2nd place, silver medalist(s)	3	3	0	0	171	2	1	0.70	.964
Junior totals				12	10	2	0	737	24	1	1.95	.919
Senior totals				3	3	0	0	171	2	1	0.70	.964

== Awards and honours ==
Award	Year	Ref
WHL
Everett Silvertips Rookie of the Year	2014–15	
Everett Silvertips MVP	2015–16, 2016–17, 2017–18	
Del Wilson Trophy	2015–16, 2016–17, 2017–18	
CHL Goaltender of the Year	2015–16, 2017–18	
Four Broncos Memorial Trophy	2017–18	
Everett Silvertips Community Relations Award	2017–18	
NHL
Rookie of the Month	2018–19	
Second Star of the Week	2018–19	
