= 2019 IIHF World Championship playoff round =

The playoff round of the 2019 IIHF World Championship was held from 23 to 26 May 2019. The top four of each preliminary group qualified for the playoff round.

== Qualified teams ==
Group	Winners	Runners-up	Third place	Fourth place
A	Canada (2)	Finland (4)	Germany (6)	United States (7)
B	Russia (1)	Czech Republic (3)	Sweden (5)	Switzerland (8)

The ranking from preliminary round is stated in brackets. This ranking was used for seeding in the semi-finals to ensure that the strongest remaining team faced the lowest ranked team.

== Bracket ==
There was a re-seeding after the quarterfinals.

Quarterfinals
23 May
Canada (OT)	3
Switzerland	2
23 May
Czech Republic	5
Germany	1
23 May
Russia	4
United States	3
23 May
Finland (OT)	5
Sweden	4

Semifinals
25 May
Canada	5
Czech Republic	1
25 May
Russia	0
Finland	1

Final
26 May
Canada	1
Finland	3
Third place
26 May
Russia (GWS)	3
Czech Republic	2

All times are local (UTC+2).

== Quarterfinals ==
23 May 2019; 16:15	Canada	3–2 OT (0–1, 1–1, 1–0) (OT: 1–0)	Switzerland	Steel Aréna, Košice; Attendance: 6,157

Game reference

Matt Murray
Goalies
Leonardo Genoni
Referees:
(Czech Republic) Martin Fraňo
(Finland) Aleksi Rantala
Linesmen:
(Czech Republic) Miroslav Lhotský
(Finland) Hannu Sormunen

	0–1	18:06 – Andrighetto (Diaz, Fiala) (PP)
Stone (Fabbro, Dubois) – 25:45	1–1
	1–2	39:57 – Hischier (Martschini, Niederreiter) (PP)
Severson (Stone) (EA) – 59:59	2–2
Stone (Dubois, Theodore) – 65:07	3–2

6 min
Penalties
2 min
42
Shots
24

23 May 2019; 16:15	Russia	4–3 (2–0, 0–1, 2–2)	United States	Ondrej Nepela Arena, Bratislava; Attendance: 9,085

Game reference

Andrei Vasilevskiy
Goalies
Cory Schneider
Referees:
(Sweden) Tobias Bjork
(Canada) Oliver Gouin
Linesmen:
(Sweden) Andreas Malmqvist
(Czech Republic) Jiří Ondráček

Gusev (Sergachev, Kucherov) – 01:07	1–0
Sergachev (Gusev) (PP) – 15:47	2–0
	2–1	22:22 – Skjei (Kane, Gaudreau)
Kaprizov (Gusev, Sergachev) – 41:31	3–1
	3–2	45:53 – Hanifin (J. Hughes)
Grigorenko (Malkin, Dadonov) – 47:02	4–2
	4–3	57:10 – DeBrincat (Kane, J. Hughes) (EA)

2 min
Penalties
2 min
43
Shots
32

23 May 2019; 20:15	Finland	5–4 OT (1–2, 2–2, 1–0) (OT: 1–0)	Sweden	Steel Aréna, Košice; Attendance: 6,304

Game reference

Kevin Lankinen
Goalies
Henrik Lundqvist
Referees:
(Russia) Roman Gofman
(Canada) Brett Iverson
Linesmen:
(United States) William Hancock
(Russia) Dmitri Shishlo

Mikkola (Pesonen, Manninen) – 01:00	1–0
	1–1	02:38 – Klingberg (Nylander, Wennberg) (PP)
	1–2	16:57 – Hörnqvist (Ekman-Larsson, Larsson)
	1–3	20:25 – E. Pettersson (Landeskog, Ekman-Larsson)
Lindbohm (Manninen, Pesonen) – 25:04	2–3
Hakanpää (Manninen) – 29:08	3–3
	3–4	39:35 – Gustafsson (Landeskog, Wennberg)
Anttila (Ojamäki, Lehtonen) (EA) – 58:31	4–4
Manninen (Lankinen) – 61:37	5–4

4 min
Penalties
0 min
32
Shots
18

23 May 2019; 20:15	Czech Republic	5–1 (0–0, 1–1, 4–0)	Germany	Ondrej Nepela Arena, Bratislava; Attendance: 9,085

Game reference

Patrik Bartošák
Goalies
Philipp Grubauer
Referees:
(Sweden) Linus Öhlund
(United States) Jeremy Tufts
Linesmen:
(Belarus) Dmitri Golyak
(Finland) Lauri Nikulainen

Kovář – 33:41	1–0
	1–1	37:46 – Mauer (Tiffels)
Voráček (Simon) – 44:19	2–1
Kubalík (Kovář, Hronek) – 51:41	3–1
Palát (Kolář) – 53:08	4–1
Kovář (Moravčík) (EN) – 59:54	5–1

6 min
Penalties
6 min
34
Shots
22

== Semifinals ==
25 May 2019; 15:15	Russia	0–1 (0–0, 0–0, 0–1)	Finland	Ondrej Nepela Arena, Bratislava; Attendance: 9,085

Game reference
Andrei Vasilevskiy	Goalies	Kevin Lankinen	Referees: (Sweden) Tobias Bjork (Czech Republic) Martin Fraňo; Linesmen: (United States) Brian Oliver (Canada) Nathan Vanoosten
0–1 / 50:18 – Anttila (Jokiharju, Kiviranta)			Referees: (Sweden) Tobias Bjork (Czech Republic) Martin Fraňo; Linesmen: (United States) Brian Oliver (Canada) Nathan Vanoosten
6 min	Penalties	4 min	Referees: (Sweden) Tobias Bjork (Czech Republic) Martin Fraňo; Linesmen: (United States) Brian Oliver (Canada) Nathan Vanoosten
32	Shots	29	Referees: (Sweden) Tobias Bjork (Czech Republic) Martin Fraňo; Linesmen: (United States) Brian Oliver (Canada) Nathan Vanoosten

25 May 2019; 19:15	Canada	5–1 (1–0, 2–0, 2–1)	Czech Republic	Ondrej Nepela Arena, Bratislava; Attendance: 9,085

Game reference

Matt Murray
Goalies
Patrik Bartošák
Pavel Francouz
Referees:
(Finland) Mikko Kaukokari
(United States) Jeremy Tufts
Linesmen:
(Russia) Gleb Lazarev
(Finland) Hannu Sormunen

Stone (Stecher) – 05:18	1–0
Nurse (Couturier) – 20:10	2–0
Dubois (Marchessault, Stone) – 25:06	3–0
Turris (Mantha) – 46:26	4–0
Chabot (Henrique, Strome) – 53:00	5–0
	5–1	53:59 – Zohorna (Kolář)

12 min
Penalties
6 min
30
Shots
41

== Bronze medal game ==
26 May 2019; 15:45	Russia	3–2 GWS (1–2, 1–0, 0–0) (OT: 0–0) (SO: 1–0)	Czech Republic	Ondrej Nepela Arena, Bratislava; Attendance: 9,085

Game reference

Andrei Vasilevskiy
Goalies
Šimon Hrubec
Referees:
(Canada) Oliver Gouin
(Finland) Mikko Kaukokari
Linesmen:
(Sweden) Andreas Malmqvist
(United States) Brian Oliver

Grigorenko (Sergachev) – 13:00	1–0
	1–1	13:41 – Řepík (Sklenička, Rutta)
	1–2	18:34 – Kubalík (Kovář, Gulaš)
Anisimov (Gusev) – 20:39	2–2

Kovalchuk
Kucherov (miss)
Gusev
Shootout
(miss) Vrána
(miss) Kubalík
(miss) Kovář
(miss) Hronek
2 min
Penalties
4 min
31
Shots
50

== Gold medal game ==
26 May 2019; 20:15 (UTC+2)	Canada	1–3 (1–0, 0–1, 0–2)	Finland	Ondrej Nepela Arena, Bratislava; Attendance: 9,085

Game reference

Matt Murray
Goalies
Kevin Lankinen
Referees:
(Sweden) Tobias Björk
(United States) Jeremy Tufts
Linesmen:
(Russia) Gleb Lazarev
(Czech Republic) Miroslav Lhotský

Theodore (Mantha, McCann) – 10:02	1–0
	1–1	22:35 – Anttila (Manninen, Ojamäki) (PP)
	1–2	42:35 – Anttila (Savinainen)
	1–3	55:54 – Pesonen (Tyrväinen, Hakanpää)

6 min
Penalties
8 min
44
Shots
22
