= Antonin Manavian =

French ice hockey player

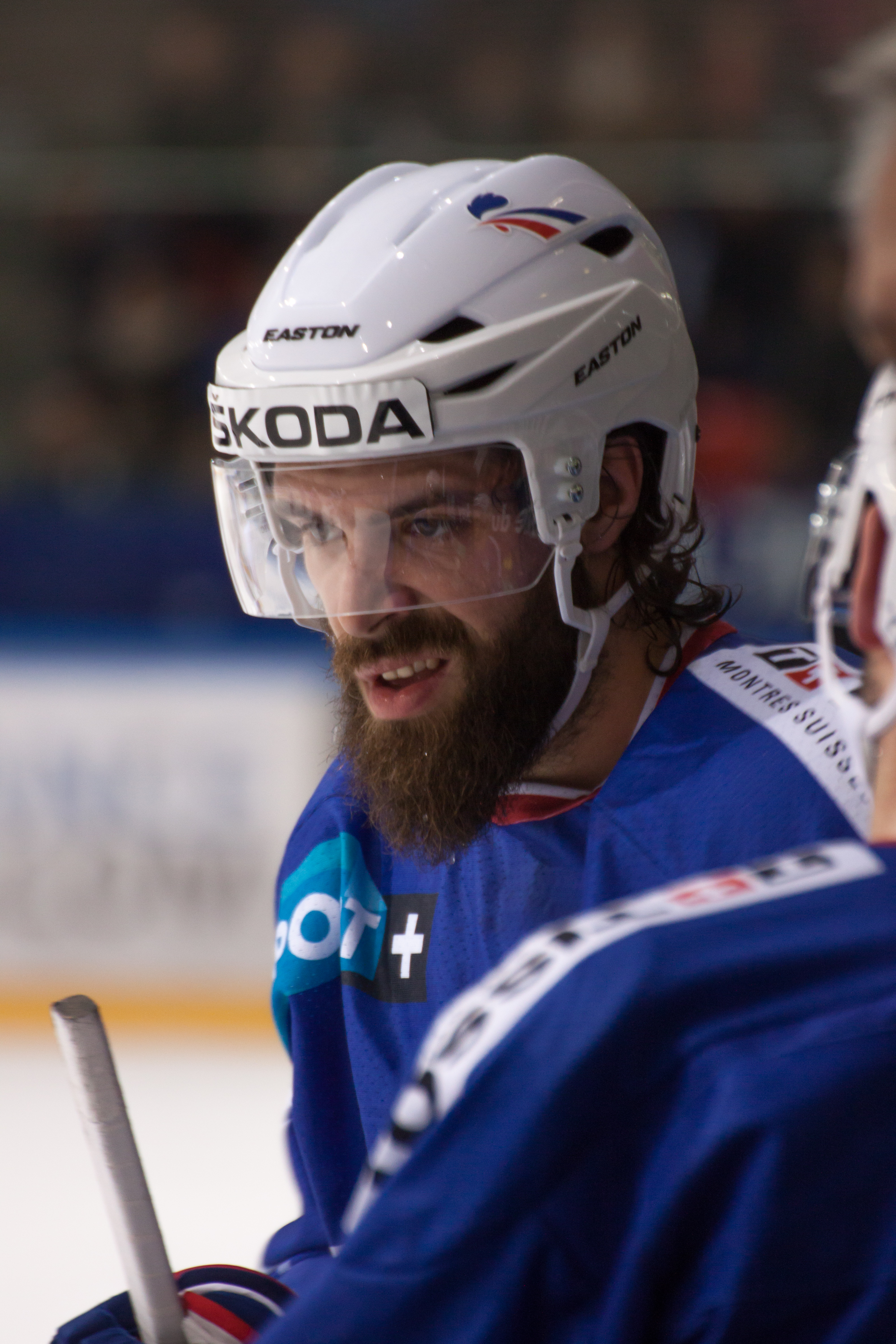
- Born: April 26, 1987 (age 37); Paris, France
- Height: 6 ft 3 in (191 cm)
- Weight: 225 lb (102 kg; 16 st 1 lb)
- Position: Defence
- Shoots: Right
- Magnus team Former teams: Brûleurs de Loups; Bakersfield Condors; Ducs d'Angers; Dragons de Rouen; HC TWK Innsbruck; Alba Volán Székesfehérvár; KHL Medveščak Zagreb
- National team: France
- NHL draft: Undrafted
- Playing career: 2004–present

Antonin Manavian (born April 26, 1987) is a French professional ice hockey defenceman who is currently playing for Brûleurs de Loups of the Ligue Magnus.

== Playing career ==
Manavian played two seasons with Hungarian club, Alba Volán Székesfehérvár of the EBEL before leaving as a free agent following the 2016–17 season. On May 26, 2017, Manavian agreed to a one-year deal with neighbouring DEL outfit, Krefeld Pinguine. He was later released from his contract before the season and returned to Alba Volán Székesfehérvár.

== International play ==
He participated at the 2009, 2010, 2012 and 2013 IIHF World Championship as a member of the France National men's ice hockey team. Of Armenian descent. Manavian was later named to the France men's national ice hockey team for competition at the 2014 IIHF World Championship.
