= Marián Studenič =

Slovak ice hockey player (born 1998)

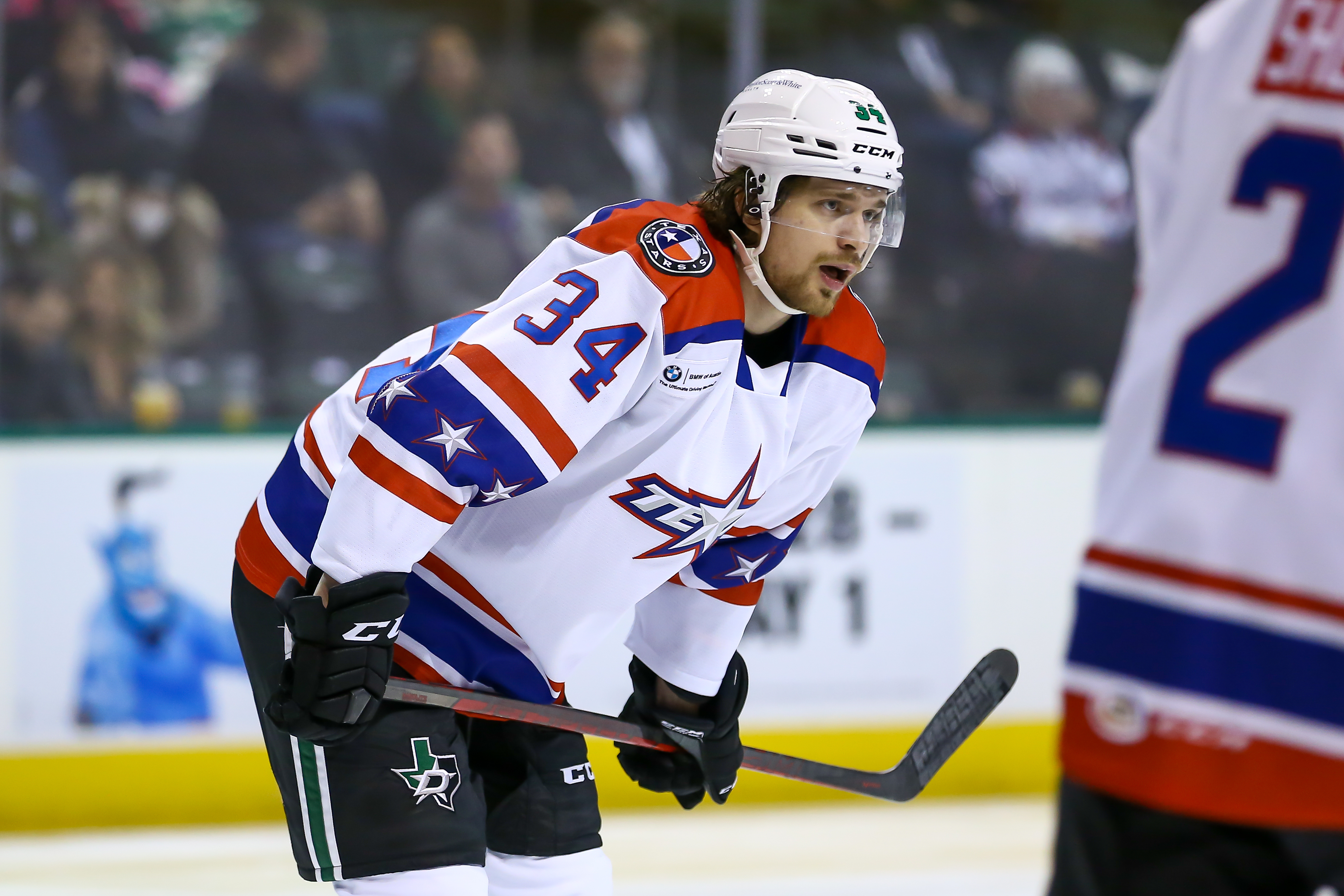
- Studenič with the Texas Stars in 2022
- Born: 28 October 1998 (age 27) Skalica, Slovakia
- Height: 185 cm (6 ft 1 in)
- Weight: 75 kg (165 lb; 11 st 11 lb)
- Position: Right wing
- Shoots: Left
- SHL team Former teams: Färjestad BK; HK 36 Skalica; HK Dukla Trenčín; HC Slovan Bratislava; New Jersey Devils; Dallas Stars; Seattle Kraken
- National team: Slovakia
- NHL draft: 143rd overall, 2017; New Jersey Devils
- Playing career: 2015–present

Marián Studenič (born 28 October 1998) is a Slovak professional ice hockey winger for Färjestad BK of the Swedish Hockey League (SHL). He was drafted in the fifth round (143rd overall) in the 2017 NHL entry draft by the New Jersey Devils.

== Playing career ==
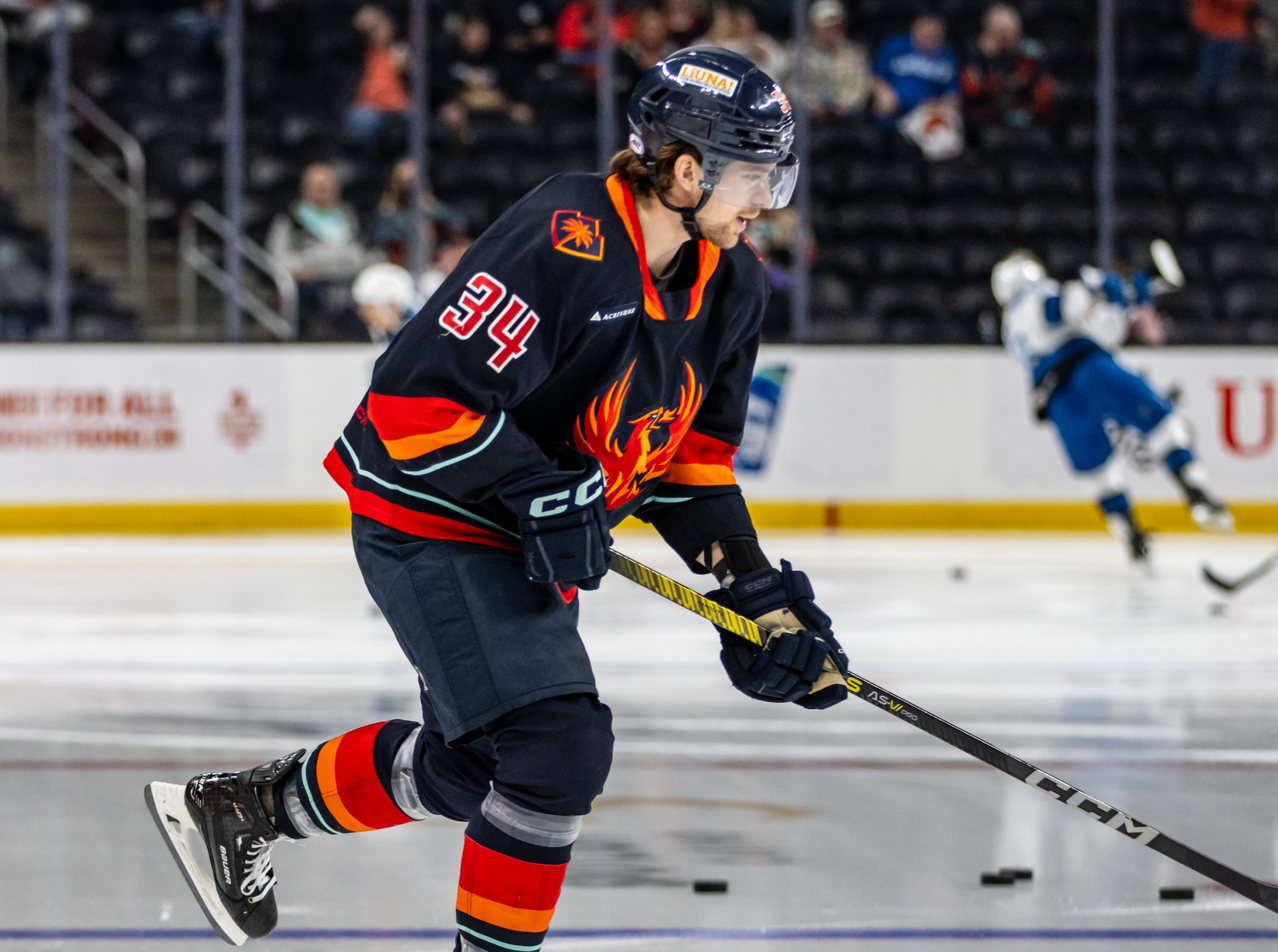
Studenič with the Coachella Valley Firebirds in 2024

Studenič played as a youth within hometown team, HK 36 Skalica. He made his professional debut with the club during the 2014–15 season in the Slovak Extraliga.

After two seasons in the Slovak League, Studenič moved to North America to develop his game at the major junior level. He was selected 11th overall in the 2016 OHL Import Draft by the Hamilton Bulldogs of the Ontario Hockey League (OHL).

Following a successful rookie campaign with the Bulldogs in the 2016–17 season, recording 18 goals in 58 games, Studenič was selected in the fifth-round, 143rd overall, by the New Jersey Devils in the 2017 NHL entry draft. He was ranked 101 overall for North American skaters by the NHL Central Scouting Bureau.

On 2 April 2018, Studenič signed a three-year, entry-level contract with the New Jersey Devils. After attending the Devils training camp, Studenič was assigned to their American Hockey League (AHL) affiliate, the Binghamton Devils, for the 2018–19 season. Studenič made his AHL debut on 7 October 2018 against the Toronto Marlies where he also scored his first AHL goal.

On 13 August 2020, Studenič was assigned by the Devils to HC Slovan Bratislava of the Slovak Extraliga on loan until the commencement of the delayed 2020–21 North American season. He scored his first NHL goal against the New York Rangers on 18 April 2021.

In the following 2021–22 season, Studenič split the season between New Jersey and new AHL affiliate, the Utica Comets, registering just one goal through 17 games with the Devils. On 24 January 2022, Studenič's tenure with the Devils ended as he was claimed off waivers by the Dallas Stars.

On 1 July 2023, having left the Stars as a free agent after not receiving a qualifying offer, Studenič was signed to a one-year, two-way contract with the Seattle Kraken for the 2023–24 season.

On 30 June 2024, Studenič decided to return to Europe by signing a two-year contract with Färjestad BK of the Swedish Hockey League (SHL).

== International play ==
On 19 April 2019, Studenič made his senior national team debut in Euro Hockey Challenge match against Austria. Three minutes into the first period he scored his first senior national team goal in his first shift of the match.

== Career statistics ==
=== Regular season and playoffs ===
			Regular season					Playoffs
Season	Team	League	GP	G	A	Pts	PIM	GP	G	A	Pts	PIM
2014–15	HK 36 Skalica	Slovak	1	0	0	0	0	—	—	—	—	—
2015–16	HK 36 Skalica	Slovak	35	8	8	16	20	—	—	—	—	—
2015–16	HK Dukla Trenčín	Slovak	2	0	0	0	0	—	—	—	—	—
2016–17	Hamilton Bulldogs	OHL	58	18	12	30	23	7	2	2	4	4
2017–18	Hamilton Bulldogs	OHL	62	20	28	48	14	21	3	12	15	12
2018–19	Binghamton Devils	AHL	64	13	15	28	18	—	—	—	—	—
2019–20	Binghamton Devils	AHL	37	9	8	17	20	—	—	—	—	—
2020–21	HC Slovan Bratislava	Slovak	25	6	9	15	50	—	—	—	—	—
2020–21	Binghamton Devils	AHL	22	3	4	7	14	—	—	—	—	—
2020–21	New Jersey Devils	NHL	8	1	1	2	4	—	—	—	—	—
2021–22	New Jersey Devils	NHL	17	1	0	1	0	—	—	—	—	—
2021–22	Utica Comets	AHL	13	5	5	10	6	—	—	—	—	—
2021–22	Texas Stars	AHL	4	2	4	6	6	—	—	—	—	—
2021–22	Dallas Stars	NHL	16	1	2	3	6	4	0	0	0	2
2022–23	Texas Stars	AHL	67	21	27	48	35	8	2	4	6	2
2022–23	Dallas Stars	NHL	3	0	0	0	0	—	—	—	—	—
2023–24	Coachella Valley Firebirds	AHL	64	15	29	44	14	18	4	7	11	8
2023–24	Seattle Kraken	NHL	2	0	0	0	2	—	—	—	—	—
2024–25	Färjestad BK	SHL	50	14	30	44	43	6	4	1	5	2
Slovak totals			63	14	17	31	70	—	—	—	—	—
NHL totals			46	3	3	6	12	4	0	0	0	2

=== International ===
Year	Team	Event	Result	GP	G	A	Pts	PIM
2014	Slovakia	U17	8th	5	0	1	1	2
2015	Slovakia	IH18	8th	4	1	1	2	4
2016	Slovakia	U18	5th	5	0	2	2	2
2017	Slovakia	WJC	8th	5	0	0	0	4
2018	Slovakia	WJC	7th	5	0	0	0	4
2019	Slovakia	WC	9th	7	1	4	5	2
2021	Slovakia	WC	8th	8	0	1	1	0
2021	Slovakia	OGQ	Q	3	0	1	1	2
Junior totals				24	1	4	5	16
Senior totals				18	1	6	7	4
