= Valentin Claireaux =

French ice hockey player

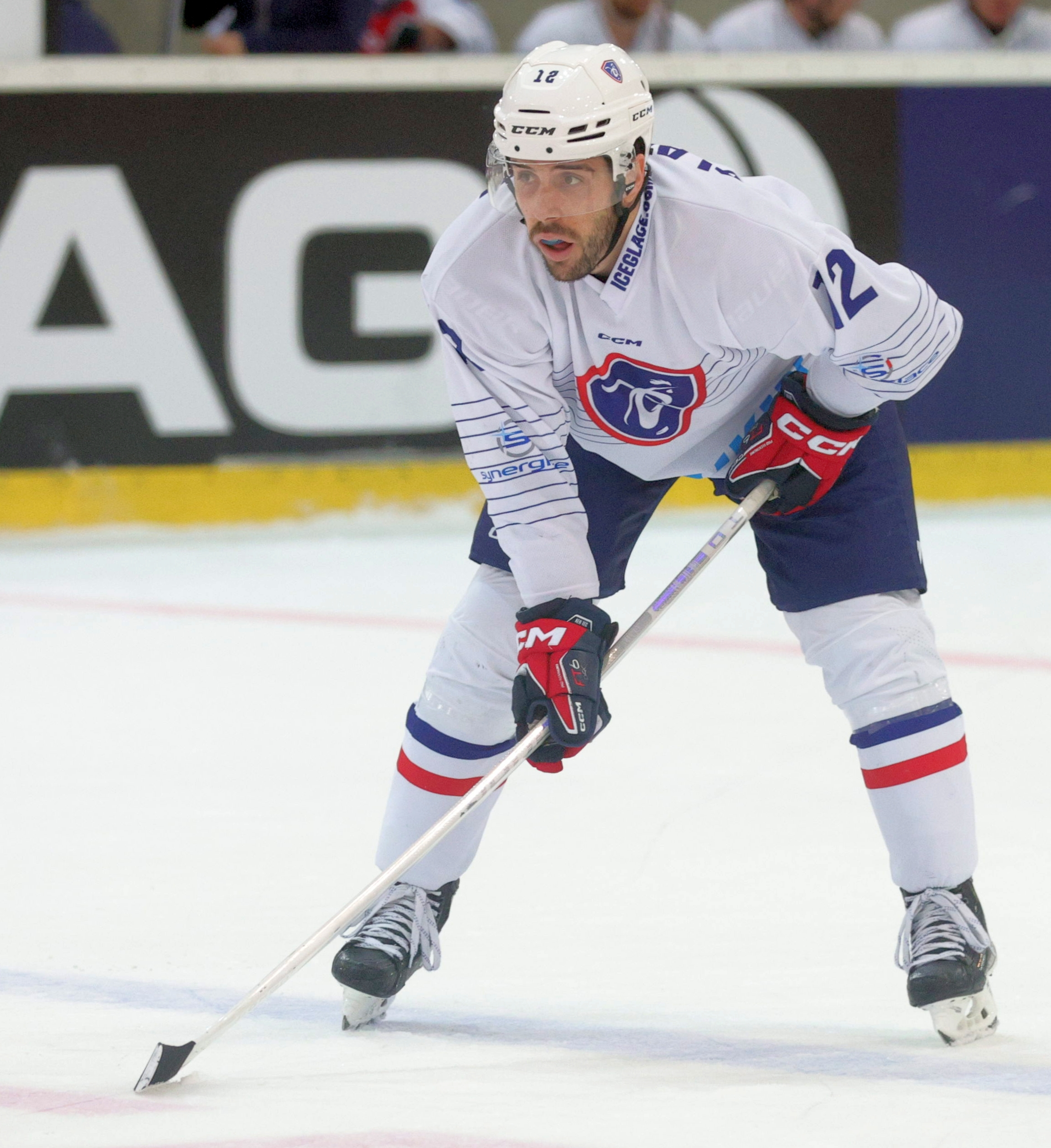
- Claireaux in 2024
- Born: April 5, 1991 (age 35) Saint Pierre and Miquelon, France
- Height: 5 ft 11 in (180 cm)
- Weight: 198 lb (90 kg; 14 st 2 lb)
- Position: Forward
- Shoots: Right
- ELH team Former teams: HC Vítkovice; Gothiques d'Amiens; Lukko; Vaasan Sport; PSG Zlín; HC Dynamo Pardubice; BK Mladá Boleslav; EHC Kloten; Dragons de Rouen
- National team: France
- Playing career: 2009–present

Valentin Claireaux (born April 5, 1991) is a French professional ice hockey player for HC Vítkovice Ridera in the Czech Extraliga (ELH) and the French national team. He participated at the 2015 IIHF World Championship and the 2018 IIHF World Championship.

Valentin's most recent hockey season was with the Deer Lake Red Wings (2025-2026 season) from the West Coast in Newfoundland. During this season, Valentin helped the Deer Lake Red Wings to win the Central West Senior Hockey League's Cliff Gorman Cup and further helped the Red Wings to win the 2026 Herder Memorial Trophy champsionship. The Herder is a tournament played between the winner of the Avalon East Senior Hockey League (AESHL) on the East Coast of Newfoundland and the winning team of the Central West Senior Hockey League (CWSHL).
