= Anthony Rech =

French ice hockey player (born 1992)

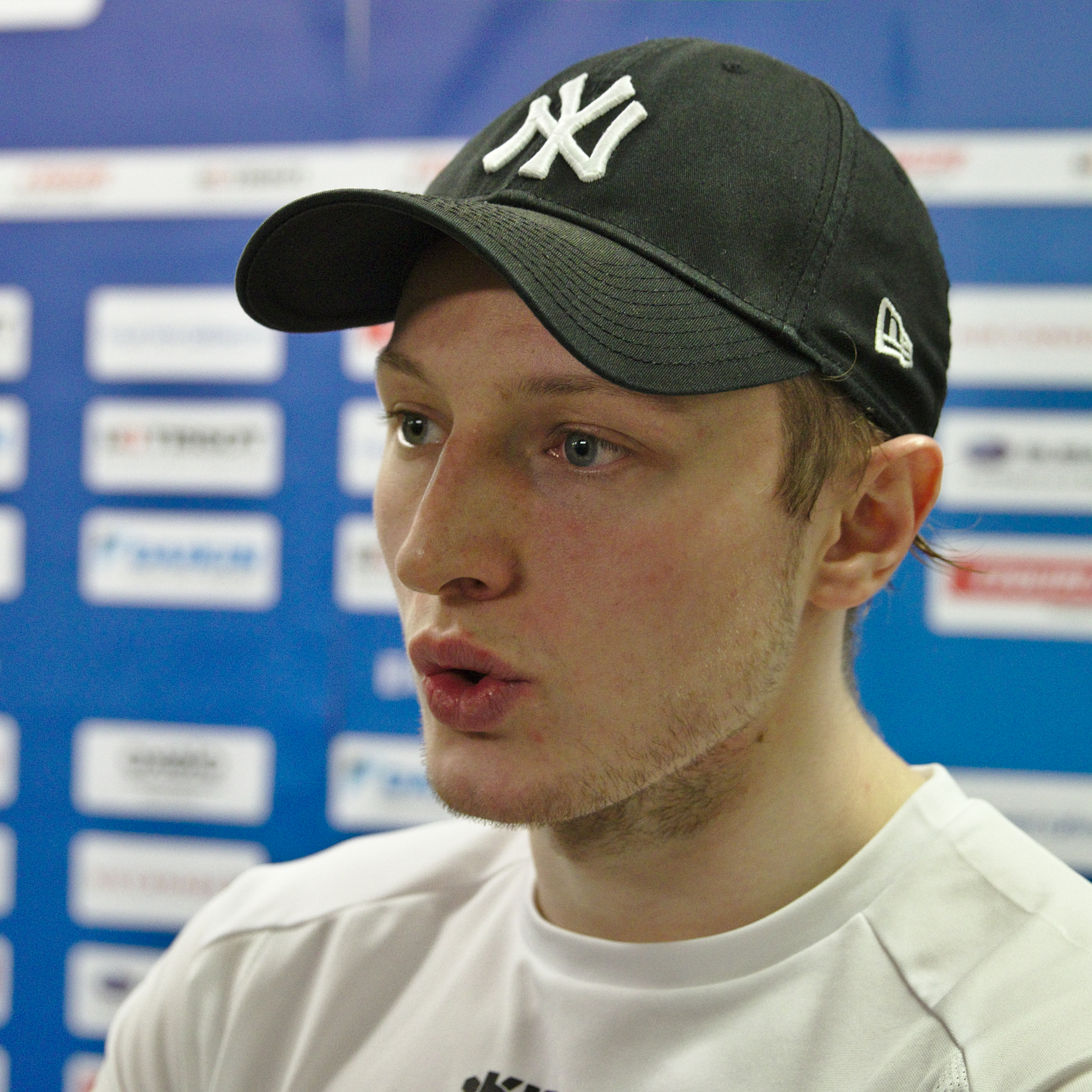
- Rech in 2015
- Born: July 9, 1992 (age 33) Sallanches, France
- Height: 5 ft 11 in (180 cm)
- Weight: 194 lb (88 kg; 13 st 12 lb)
- Position: Winger
- Shoots: Left
- Magnus team Former teams: Dragons de Rouen; Ducs de Dijon; Rapaces de Gap; Schwenninger Wild Wings; Grizzlys Wolfsburg; HC TPS; Iserlohn Roosters
- National team: France
- Playing career: 2009–present

Anthony Rech (born July 9, 1992) is a French professional ice hockey player who is a winger for Dragons de Rouen of the Ligue Magnus. He also represents the French national team.

== Playing career ==
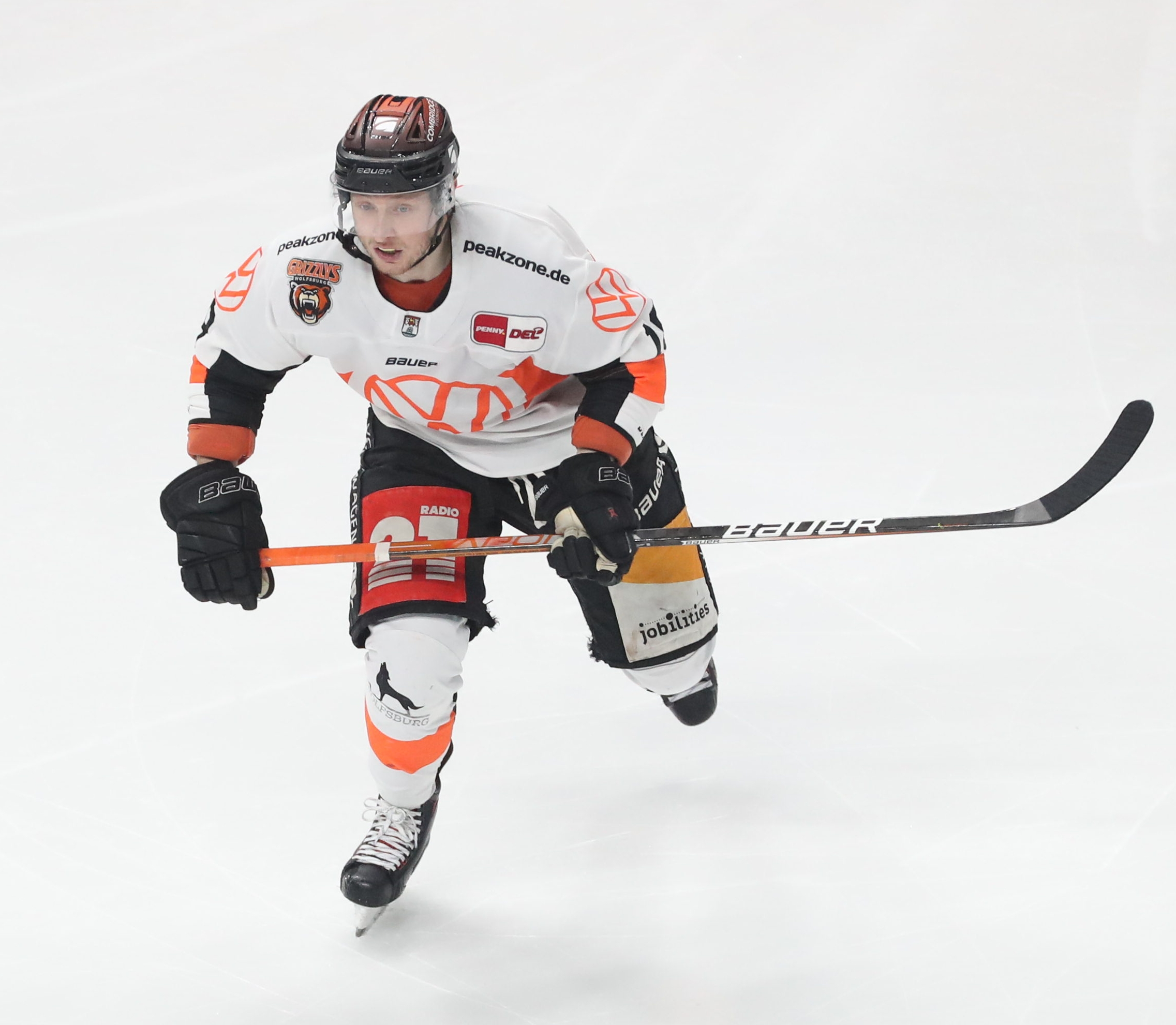
Rech with Grizzlys Wolfsburg (2022)

Having spent the initial eight years of his professional career in the French Ligue Magnus, Rech decided to pursue his career in Germany, signing a one-year contract with the Schwenninger Wild Wings of the Deutsche Eishockey Liga (DEL) on September 4, 2017, following a successful trial period.

After his contract with the Wild Wings ended following the 2018–19 season, Rech became a free agent and chose to stay in the DEL by signing a one-year deal with Grizzlys Wolfsburg on March 12, 2019.

After spending three seasons with Grizzlys Wolfsburg, Rech departed the team as a free agent following the 2021–22 campaign. On June 22, 2022, he signed a one-year deal with HC TPS of Finland's Liiga.

During the 2022–23 season, Rech played 29 games for TPS, scoring 7 goals and totaling 11 points before deciding to leave Finland and return to Germany. On January 5, 2023, he signed with the Iserlohn Roosters for the remainder of the season. He added 2 points in 16 games but was unable to help Iserlohn avoid missing the playoffs for the second straight year. Rech departed the team when his contract ended on March 10, 2023.

== International play ==
Rech competed internationally as a member of the French national team, taking part in the 2015 IIHF World Championship held in the Czech Republic and returning to represent his country again at the 2018 IIHF World Championship in Denmark.
