= Dávid Buc =

Slovak professional ice hockey forward

- Born: 22 January 1987 (age 39) Poprad, Czechoslovakia
- Height: 6 ft 2 in (188 cm)
- Weight: 207 lb (94 kg; 14 st 11 lb)
- Position: Forward
- Shoots: Left
- Slovak team Former teams: HK Poprad; HK Dukla MICHALOVCE; HC Košice; MsHK Žilina; HC Karlovy Vary; HK Dukla Trenčín; HC Olomouc; HC '05 Banská Bystrica; Bratislava Capitals
- National team: Slovakia
- Playing career: 2008–present

Dávid Buc (born 22 January 1987) is a Slovak professional ice hockey forward who is currently playing for HK Poprad of the Slovak Extraliga.

== Career ==
He made his professional debut with hometown club, HK Poprad in the Slovak Extraliga (Slovak). He formerly played with Bratislava in the Extraliga during the 2010–11 season.

He returned to HC Slovan Bratislava after 6 years, securing an initial KHL try-out contract on August 16, 2018.

== Career statistics ==
=== Regular season and playoffs ===
			Regular season					Playoffs
Season	Team	League	GP	G	A	Pts	PIM	GP	G	A	Pts	PIM
KHL totals			32	1	3	4	6	—	—	—	—	—
Czech totals			111	18	34	52	32	16	5	5	10	6
Slovak totals			417	96	130	226	234	65	17	15	32	70

=== International ===
Year	Team	Event	Result	GP	G	A	Pts	PIM
2005	Slovakia	WJC18	6th	6	0	0	0	0
2007	Slovakia	WJC	8th	6	1	3	4	2
2018	Slovakia	WC	9th	7	1	2	3	0
2019	Slovakia	WC	9th	7	0	3	3	0
2021	Slovakia	WC	8th	4	0	1	1	0
Junior totals				12	1	3	4	2
Senior totals				18	1	6	7	0
