= Olivier Dame-Malka =

Canadian-born French ice hockey player

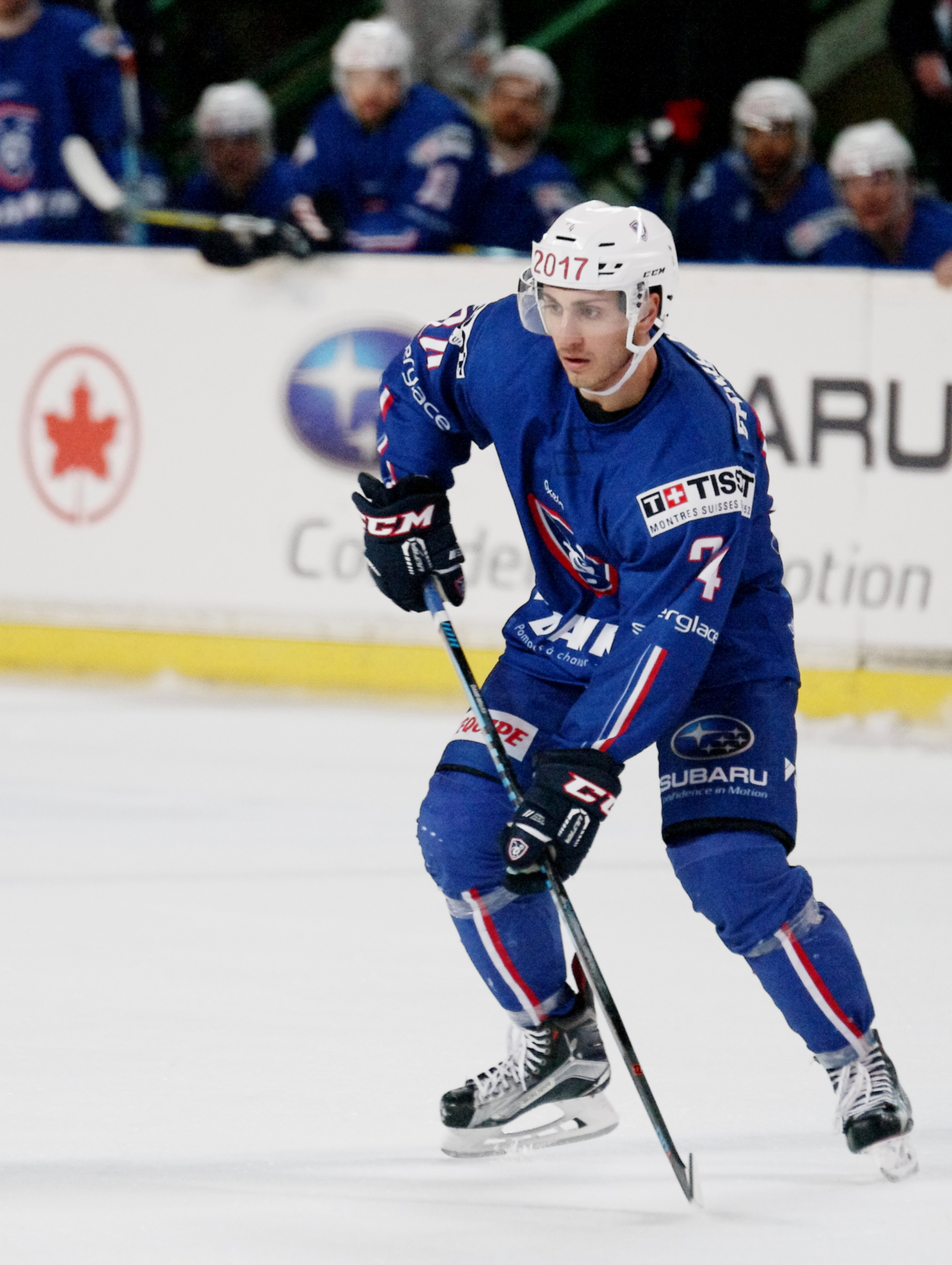
- Born: May 30, 1990 (age 36) Montreal, Quebec, Canada
- Height: 5 ft 11 in (180 cm)
- Weight: 192 lb (87 kg; 13 st 10 lb)
- Position: Defence
- Shoots: Left
- Metal Ligaen team Former teams: Rødovre Mighty Bulls; Hamilton Bulldogs; Ducs de Dijon; Dragons de Rouen; HC '05 Banská Bystrica; Brûleurs de Loups; Aigles de Nice
- National team: France
- NHL draft: Undrafted
- Playing career: 2011–present
Medal record
Ice hockey
Representing Canada
Maccabiah Games
Gold medal – first place	2013 Israel	Ice hockey

Olivier Dame-Malka (born May 30, 1990) is a Canadian-born French professional ice hockey defenceman. He is currently playing with Rødovre Mighty Bulls in the Metal Ligaen. Internationally he plays for the French national team, and played at the 2017 World Championship. Dame-Malka is Jewish, and was born in Montreal, Quebec, Canada.

== Playing career ==
Dame-Malka played four seasons (2007–2011) in the Quebec Major Junior Hockey League (QMJHL), scoring 33 goals and 81 assists for 114 points, and earning 376 penalty minutes in 226 games played.

On December 31, 2012, the Bakersfield Condors of the ECHL traded Dame-Malka to the Toledo Walleye in exchange for defenceman Dale Warkentin and forward Max Campbell.

He played for Team Canada at the 2013 Maccabiah Games in Israel, where they won a gold medal.

After four seasons in Europe, spending the majority of his tenure in the Ligue Magnus, Dame-Malka returned to North America in agreeing to a second stint with the Florida Everblades of the ECHL on September 26, 2018. In the 2018–19 season, Dame-Malka registered 6 assists in 20 games with the Everblades, before opting to return to France on January 16, 2019, reacquainting with the Ligue Magnus in signing for the remainder of the year with Nice hockey Côte d'Azur.

== Career statistics ==
			Regular season					Playoffs
Season	Team	League	GP	G	A	Pts	PIM	GP	G	A	Pts	PIM
2005–06	Lac St-Louis Lions	QMAAA	3	0	0	0	4	—	—	—	—	—
2007–08	Cape Breton Screaming Eagles	QMJHL	50	3	7	10	84	2	1	1	2	2
2008–09	Cape Breton Screaming Eagles	QMJHL	34	5	11	16	42	—	—	—	—	—
2008–09	Acadie–Bathurst Titan	QMJHL	14	0	3	3	26	—	—	—	—	—
2009–10	Acadie–Bathurst Titan	QMJHL	64	9	21	30	108	5	0	3	3	10
2010–11	Lewiston Maineiacs	QMJHL	64	16	39	55	116	15	9	10	19	25
2011–12	Hamilton Bulldogs	AHL	21	1	2	3	22	—	—	—	—	—
2011–12	Wheeling Nailers	ECHL	36	7	11	18	60	—	—	—	—	—
2012–13	Bakersfield Condors	ECHL	23	5	7	12	66	—	—	—	—	—
2012–13	Toledo Walleye	ECHL	7	1	1	2	10	—	—	—	—	—
2012–13	Florida Everblades	ECHL	22	1	4	5	59	2	0	0	0	2
2013–14	Florida Everblades	ECHL	49	9	10	19	85	—	—	—	—	—
2013–14	Ontario Reign	ECHL	8	0	3	3	37	2	0	1	1	0
2014–15	Ducs de Dijon	Ligue Magnus	24	7	9	16	125	9	1	5	6	35
2015–16	Dragons de Rouen	Ligue Magnus	24	1	9	10	65	12	4	7	11	29
2016–17	Dragons de Rouen	Ligue Magnus	44	9	10	19	73	15	3	3	6	38
2017–18	HC Banska Bystrica	Slovak	13	0	3	3	20	—	—	—	—	—
2017–18	Brûleurs de Loups	Ligue Magnus	23	5	14	19	18	15	0	4	4	45
2018–19	Florida Everblades	ECHL	20	0	6	6	12	—	—	—	—	—
2018–19	Nice hockey Côte d'Azur	Ligue Magnus	9	4	5	9	22	4	0	0	0	8
2019–20	Nice hockey Côte d'Azur	Ligue Magnus	38	8	19	27	60	—	—	—	—	—
2020–21	CSM Corona Brașov	Erste Liga	34	7	9	16	—	9	1	3	4	—
2020–21	CSM Corona Brașov	Romania	20	6	4	10	14	1	0	0	0	0
2021–22	Rødovre Mighty Bulls	Denmark	40	2	4	6	103	—	—	—	—	—
2022–23	Anglet Hormadi Élite	Ligue Magnus	39	12	19	31	88	—	—	—	—	—
2023–24	HC Banska Bystrica	Slovak	8	0	0	0	4	—	—	—	—	—
2023–24	Frisk Asker Ishockey	Norway	14	0	1	1	68	—	—	—	—	—
2023–24	Budapest Jégkorong Akadémia HC	Erste Liga	8	1	4	5	10	6	0	2	2	8
AHL totals			21	1	2	3	22	—	—	—	—	—
ECHL totals			219	30	62	92	368	4	0	1	1	2
Ligue Magnus totals			201	46	85	131	451	55	8	19	27	155

== See also ==
- List of select Jewish ice hockey players
