= Jared McCann =

Canadian ice hockey player (born 1996)

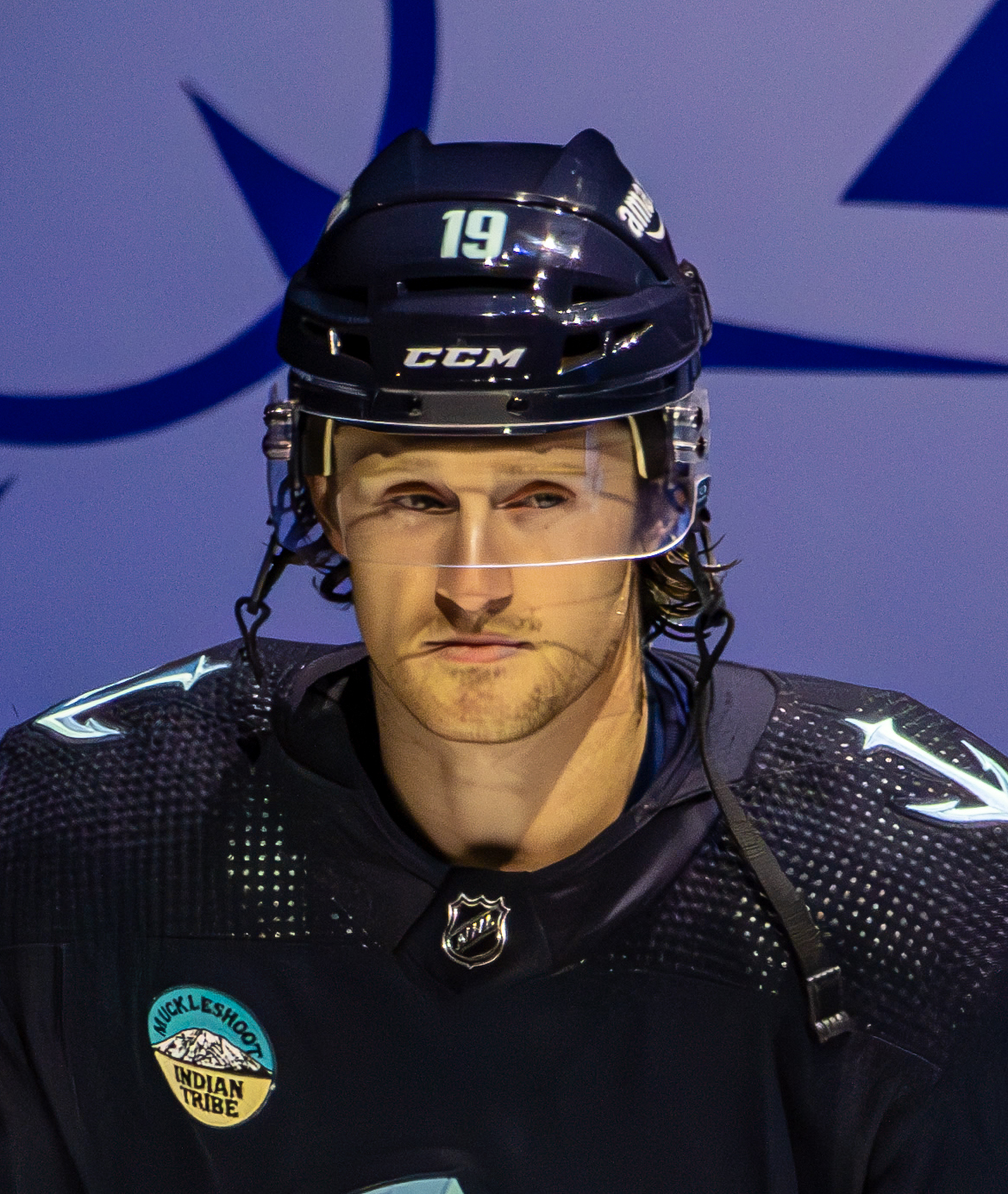
- McCann with the Seattle Kraken in 2023
- Born: May 31, 1996 (age 30) Stratford, Ontario, Canada
- Height: 6 ft 1 in (185 cm)
- Weight: 191 lb (87 kg; 13 st 9 lb)
- Position: Forward
- Shoots: Left
- NHL team Former teams: Seattle Kraken; Vancouver Canucks; Florida Panthers; Pittsburgh Penguins
- National team: Canada
- NHL draft: 24th overall, 2014; Vancouver Canucks
- Playing career: 2015–present

Jared McCann (born May 31, 1996) is a Canadian professional ice hockey player who is a forward for the Seattle Kraken of the National Hockey League (NHL). McCann was selected by the Vancouver Canucks in the first round, 24th overall, of the 2014 NHL entry draft.

Growing up in Ontario, McCann played minor hockey with teams in the area before leveling up to the Sault Ste. Marie Greyhounds of the Ontario Hockey League. After three seasons with the team, he joined the Canucks, for whom he played only one season, before being traded to the Florida Panthers. In his first season with the team, he split time between the Panthers and their American Hockey League affiliate, the Springfield Thunderbirds. After three years with the Panthers organization, he was traded to the Pittsburgh Penguins in 2019. In 2021, he was traded to the Toronto Maple Leafs before getting selected by the Seattle Kraken in the 2021 NHL expansion draft. During the 2022–23 season with the Kraken, he set career highs and franchise records in goals (40) and points (70) in a season. During the 2024–25 season, he set his career high in assists (39).

== Early life ==
McCann was born on May 31, 1996, in Stratford, Ontario, to construction company owners Erin and Matt McCann. He grew up with two older siblings, Justin and Jaimie, and an older half-brother, Jordan. Justin was adopted from Guatemala out of fears that pregnancy would exacerbate the symptoms of Erin's multiple sclerosis. The cold temperatures in Stratford meant that McCann spent his childhood playing ice hockey outside on frozen ponds. His favourite National Hockey League (NHL) team growing up was the Los Angeles Kings, because he "liked the colours and the name of the team."

== Playing career ==
=== Junior (2011–2015) ===
McCann played minor hockey with the London Jr. Knights of Alliance Hockey before joining the London Nationals of the Greater Ontario Junior Hockey League at the end of the 2011–12 season. McCann was named Alliance Hockey's Player of the Year.

On April 7, 2012, the Sault Ste. Marie Greyhounds of the Ontario Hockey League (OHL) selected McCann fourth overall in the 2012 OHL Priority Selection. In 64 games with his junior ice hockey team during the 2012–13 season, McCann scored 21 goals and recorded 23 assists. He and Sergey Tolchinsky were named co-recipients of the Greyhounds' 2013 Rookie of the Year Award, and McCann was also named to the OHL's Second All-Rookie Team. In game 1 of that year's OHL playoffs, McCann was checked by Cameron Brace of the Owen Sound Attack. He was assisted off the ice and taken to the hospital in an ambulance, with worries about a neck injury or possible concussion. He was ultimately diagnosed with a concussion and a severe case of whiplash, which kept him out of the lineup indefinitely, and Brace was given a five-game suspension for the play. The Greyhounds lost their series against the Attack in six games, with McCann unable to rejoin the team before their elimination.

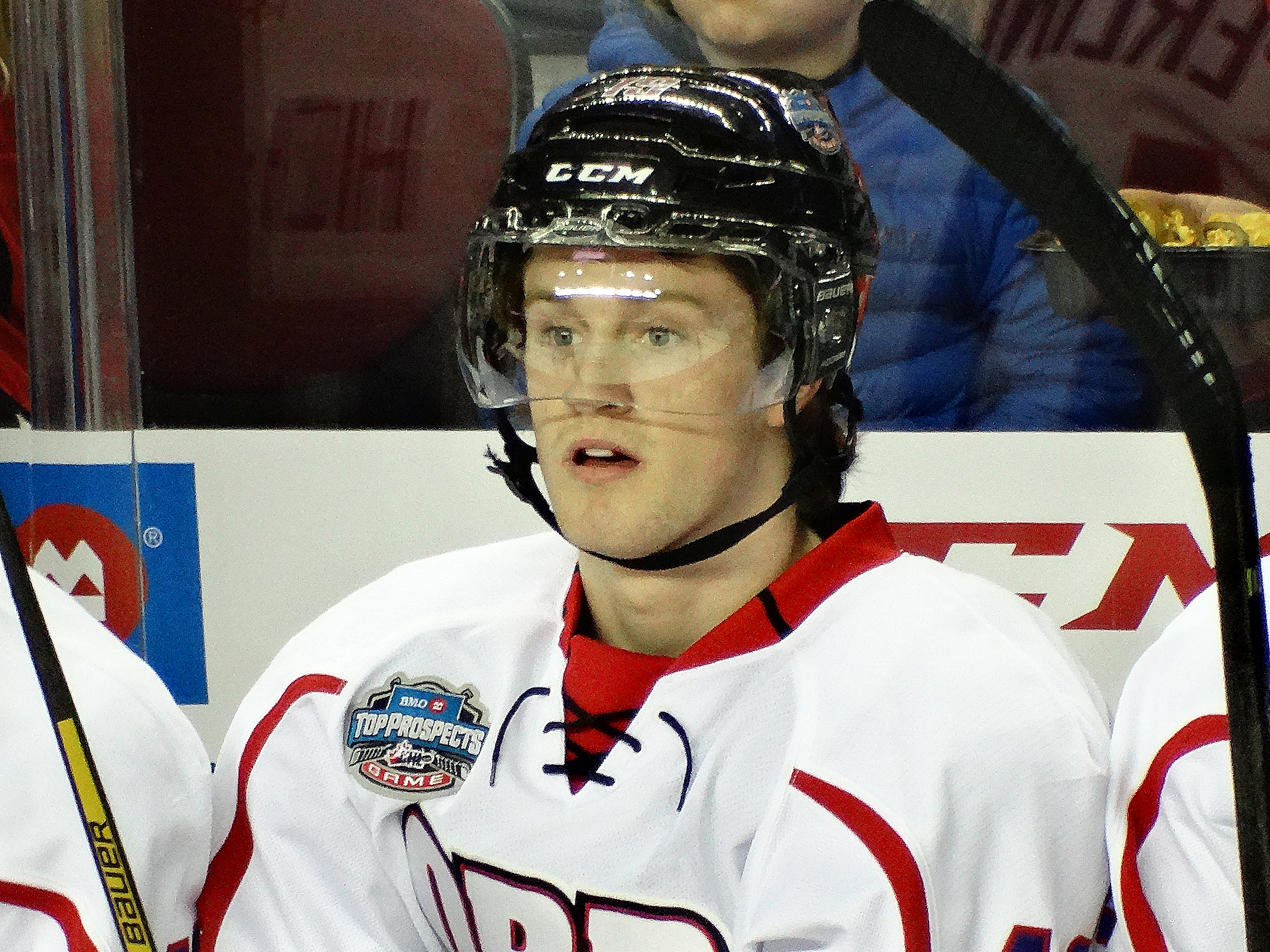
McCann during the 2014 CHL/NHL Top Prospects Game

On December 13, 2013, McCann was named to Team Orr to participate in the 2014 CHL/NHL Top Prospects Game. At the game, on January 15, 2013, he scored the game-winning goal with 3:29 remaining in the third period, to defeat Team Cherry 4–3. McCann finished the 2013–14 season with the Greyhounds totaling 27 goals and 35 assists for 62 points, all OHL career-highs for him at the time. During the playoffs, through nine games, he notched two goals and seven assists. McCann was a top prospect for the 2014 NHL entry draft, being ranked 10th overall among North American skaters by the NHL Central Scouting Bureau. At the draft on June 27, McCann was selected 24th overall by the Vancouver Canucks. The pick itself had been acquired earlier in the day through a trade in which the Anaheim Ducks received Ryan Kesler. After McCann's selection, he was signed to a three-year, entry-level contract by the Canucks on July 24, 2014.

During the 2014–15 season, McCann achieved 34 goals and 47 assists in 56 games, raising his career-high numbers. In the playoffs, through three games during the week of May 4, 2015, he notched three goals and three assists. He ended the playoffs scoring six goals and notching 10 assists through 14 games.

=== Professional ===
==== Vancouver Canucks (2015–2016) ====
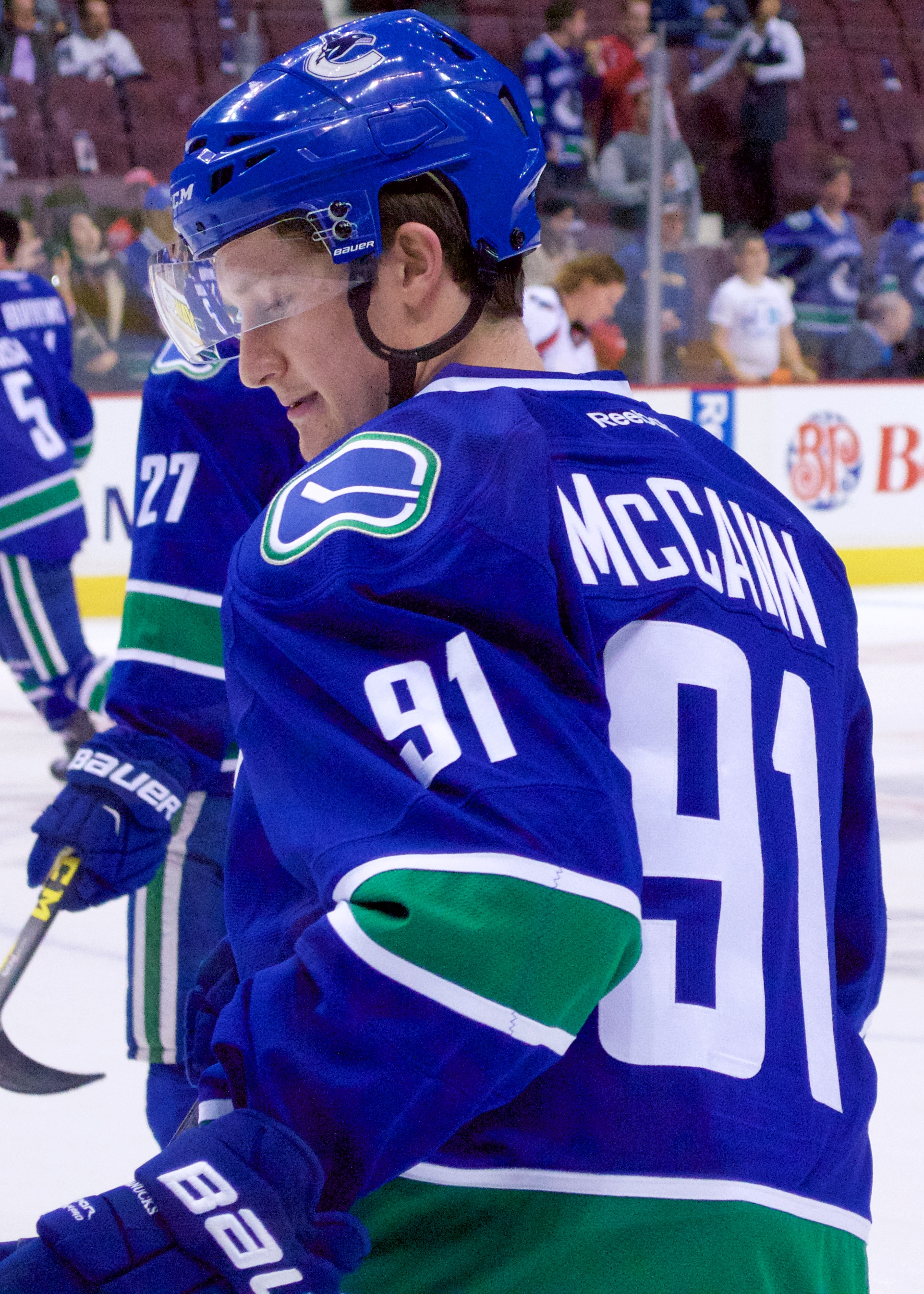
McCann with the Canucks in 2015 during his rookie NHL season

On October 5, 2015, McCann was named to the Canucks' roster for the start of the 2015–16 season. He made his NHL debut on October 7 against the Calgary Flames. In the following game, three days later, he scored his first NHL goal against Jonas Hiller of the Flames in a 3–2 overtime loss. He scored the first goal of the night. Canucks alternate captain Daniel Sedin called it "a world-class shot." On November 1, the Canucks announced that McCann and fellow rookie Jake Virtanen would remain in the NHL beyond their nine-game tryout period. His first career assist came on a Jannik Hansen goal, on November 4, in a 3–2 loss to the Pittsburgh Penguins. McCann played 69 games with the Canucks that season, totaling nine goals and 18 points.

==== Florida Panthers (2016–2019) ====
On May 25, 2016, the Canucks traded McCann with a second- and a fourth-round picks in the 2016 to the Florida Panthers in exchange for Erik Gudbranson and a 2016 fifth-round pick. At the time of the transaction, Canucks general manager Jim Benning thought his team needed a physical defenceman, while the Panthers felt that McCann was a better fit for its possession-based style of hockey than Gudbranson. McCann and Gudbranson later became teammates on the Pittsburgh Penguins in 2019.

After participating in the Panthers' training camp, McCann was named to the Panthers' opening roster for the 2016–17 season. After playing 17 games and recording one goal and two assists with the Panthers, he was reassigned to the team's American Hockey League affiliate, the Springfield Thunderbirds, on November 21, 2016, due to Nick Bjugstad being activated from injured reserve. With the Thunderbirds that season, McCann notched 11 goals and 14 assists in 29 games. During the final week of the regular season, McCann was named player of the week, having achieved four goals and seven points through three games. Through 29 games with the Panthers, McCann recorded one goal and six assists.

Early into the 2017–18 season, on October 21, 2017, McCann suffered a lower-body injury in a game against the Washington Capitals, prior to which McCann had recorded five points. On October 25, he was placed on injured reserve. After missing five games, McCann returned to action on November 4 in a 5–4 overtime loss to the New York Rangers. McCann finished the season with nine goals and 19 assists, a career high, in 68 games. On July 1, 2018, the Panthers signed McCann to a two-year, US$2,500,000 contract. On September 25, in a preseason game of the 2018–19 season, McCann received an injury to his left leg and had to be helped off the ice. In 46 games with the Panthers that season, he totaled 18 points (eight goals and 10 assists).

==== Pittsburgh Penguins (2019–2021) ====
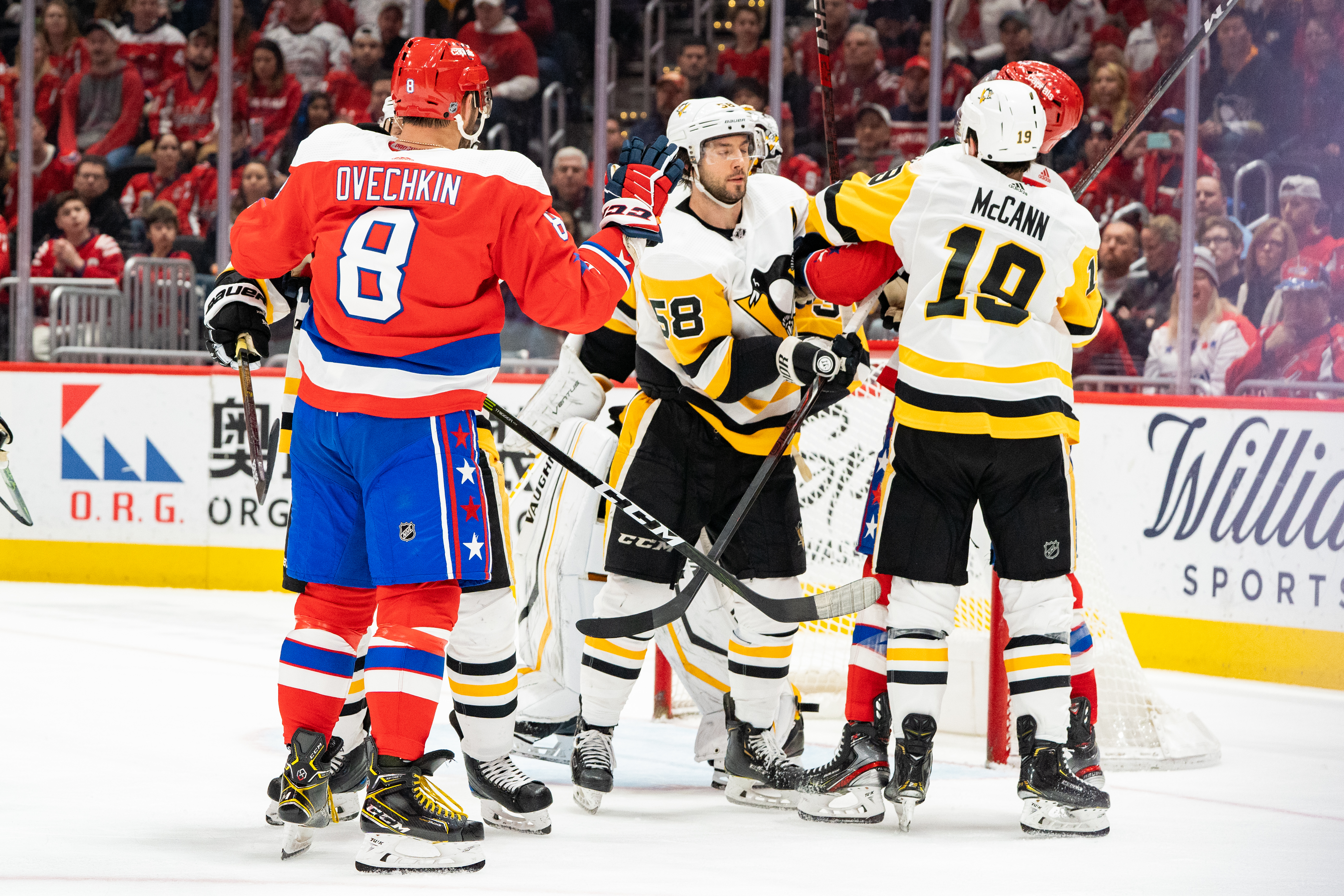
McCann (right) with the Pittsburgh Penguins in 2020

On February 1, 2019, McCann was traded to the Pittsburgh Penguins along with Nick Bjugstad in exchange for Derick Brassard, Riley Sheahan, second- and fourth-round picks in 2019, and the Minnesota Wild's fourth-round pick that year. McCann finished the 2018–19 season with the Penguins tallying 11 goals, including three shorthanded goals, and six assists in 32 games.

During the 2019–20 season, McCann set many career-high numbers, tallying 14 goals and 21 assists through 66 games. On September 18, 2020, McCann signed a two-year, $5.88 million contract to remain with the Penguins. In 43 games of the 2020–21 season, McCann notched 14 goals and 18 assists. During the 2021 Stanley Cup playoffs, he played six games and collected one assist. On July 17, 2021, McCann was traded to the Toronto Maple Leafs in exchange for a seventh-round pick and Filip Hallander. McCann was expected by both Pittsburgh and Toronto to be an expansion draft selection of the arriving Seattle Kraken; the Penguins used him to re-acquire Hallander and allow another player to be selected from their roster.

==== Seattle Kraken (2021–present) ====
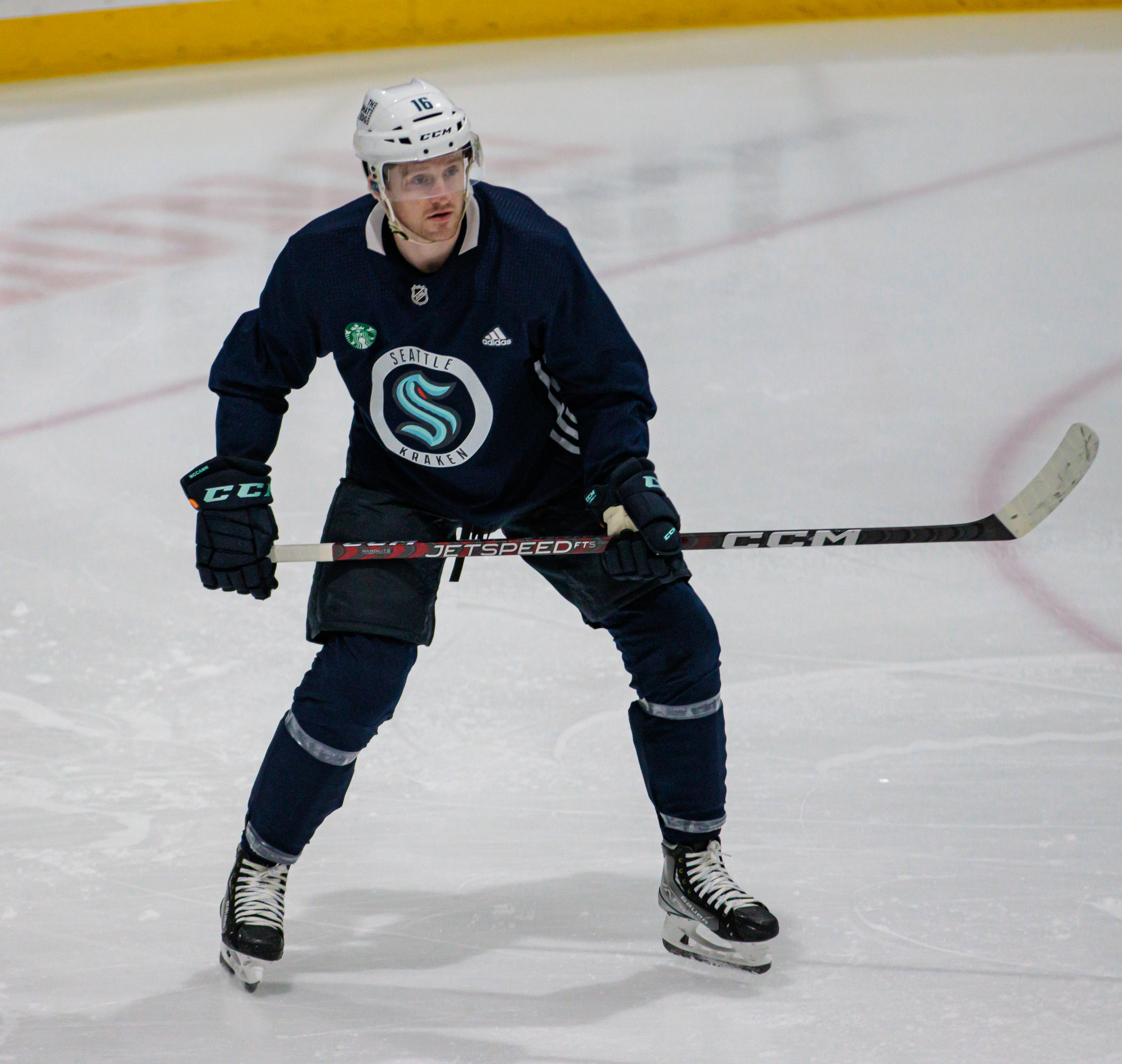
McCann practicing with the Kraken during their inaugural season, in April 2022

On July 21, 2021, McCann was selected from the Maple Leafs at the 2021 NHL expansion draft by the Seattle Kraken. During the preseason, McCann played on the Kraken's top line in the centre position between Jaden Schwartz and Jordan Eberle. Although this line was expected to play together at the start of the 2021–22 season, McCann was placed on the NHL's COVID-19 protocol list before their season opener. He was cleared to play before the contest, and he scored the second goal in Kraken franchise history while playing with Eberle and Schwartz. Despite this, the Kraken lost their first regular season game 4–3 to the Vegas Golden Knights on October 12. The line stayed together for the first four games before Schwartz was replaced by Alexander Wennberg. However, this was short-lived as he was re-added to the NHL's COVID-19 protocol list for 10 days. When he returned to the lineup on November 11, he was reunited with Schwartz and Eberle. By the end of December, McCann had tallied 12 goals and five assists to rank among the top three scorers for the Kraken. The two scorers above him were linemates Eberle (12 goals and nine assists) and Schwartz (six goals and 14 assists). McCann's 1.86 goals per 60 minutes of play marked a new career high, while his 2.78 points per 60 minutes ranked second of his career.

Schwartz underwent hand surgery in January and was replaced by Marcus Johansson on the line with McCann and Eberle. McCann eventually overtook Eberle for team lead in goals scored with his 15th of the season in mid-January. McCann eventually tallied his career-high 20th goal of the season in a 6–2 loss to the Toronto Maple Leafs on February 14. He scored another goal in his 400th career NHL game on February 21 while also leading the team in shots on goal, shot attempts, and individual shot quality. Shortly after this game, however, McCann was placed on injured reserve with an undisclosed upper-body injury. At the time of the injury, he had recorded a career-high 21 goals and 12 assists through 48 games. McCann missed three games to recover before rejoining the Kraken lineup on March 5 and playing 16:21 minutes of ice time in a 5–2 loss to the Washington Capitals. Three days later, McCann became the first player in franchise history to sign a contract extension with the team, signing a five-year contract extension with an average annual value of US$5,000,000 per year. Although the Kraken failed to qualify for the 2022 Stanley Cup playoffs, McCann set career highs by the end of the season, with 27 goals and 23 assists for 50 points. After the season, he was awarded one of the Kraken's team awards, the Pete Muldoon Award, for being the team's most valuable player.

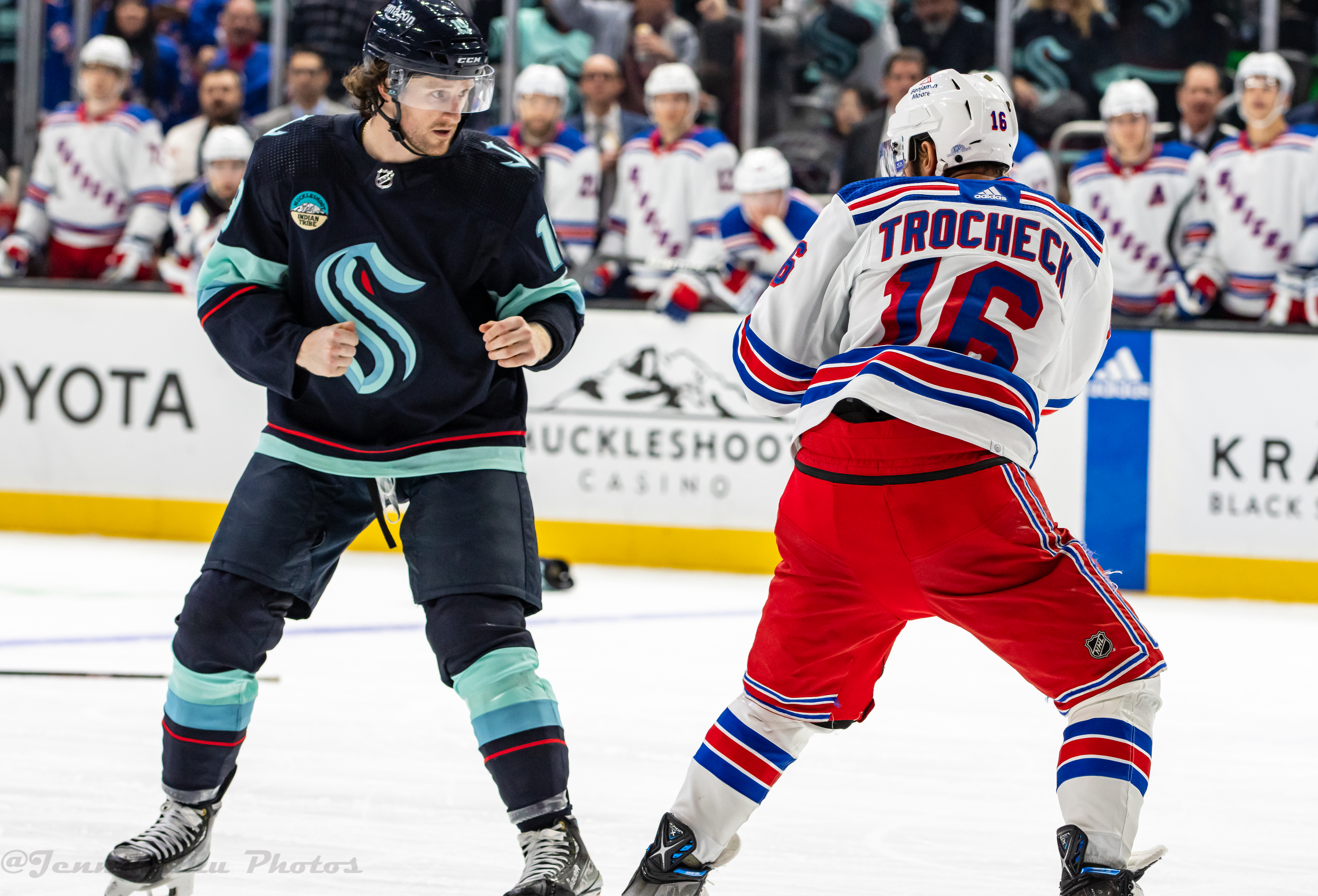
McCann (left) preparing to fight Vincent Trocheck of the New York Rangers in October 2023

During the 2022–23 season, McCann achieved many career highs and Kraken franchise records. On January 14, 2023, he recorded a hat-trick, part of an 8–5 victory over the Chicago Blackhawks, in turn helping the Kraken achieve what at the time was a franchise record eighth-straight win. On March 3, in a 4–2 win against the Columbus Blue Jackets, he achieved a franchise record as well as a career high, scoring his 30th goal of the season. He played his 500th NHL game on April 3, scoring two goals in an 8–1 victory against the Arizona Coyotes. Through 79 games of the regular season, McCann totaled 40 goals and 30 assists for 70 points, his goal and point totals that season being career highs and franchise records. The Kraken qualified for the 2023 Stanley Cup playoffs, but in game 4 of the first round, on April 24, after receiving a hit from the Colorado Avalanche's Cale Makar, McCann left the game with an injury. He returned to practicing with the Kraken on May 6, and he appeared with the Kraken on May 9 in game 4 of the second round against the Dallas Stars. McCann finished the playoffs with eight games played, scoring one goal and two assists.

Jared McCann maintained his offensive production during the 2023–24 season. On January 13, 2024, in a 7–4 win over the Columbus Blue Jackets, he tallied his 300th career point, helping the Kraken set a franchise record ninth-straight win. In 80 games that season, McCann totaled 29 goals and 33 assists for 62 points. He was then awarded the Pete Muldoon Award once again for his performance.

During the next season, 2024–25, on October 22, he scored his 100th goal as a Kraken, becoming the first player to ever hit the milestone with the team. McCann finished the season managing 22 goals and a career-high 39 assists for 61 points. During an injury-ridden 2025–26 season, he scored 20 goals and 40 points in 52 games, his lowest total since the 2020–21 season. On April 13, 2026, it was announced he would miss the last three games of the season with another injury.

== International play ==
Medal record

Men's ice hockey

Representing Canada

World Championships
Silver medal – second place	2019 Slovakia	

McCann participated as a member of Team Ontario in the 2013 World U-17 Hockey Challenge. After the end of the season, July 5, 2018, McCann was invited to Hockey Canada's selection camp for the 2013 World U18 Championships. While he did not make the team for the U18 Championships, he was named to Canada's roster for the 2013 Ivan Hlinka Memorial Tournament. At the tournament, he won the gold medal with Canada. The next year, he competed at the 2014 World U18 Championships, playing seven games and registering one goal and three points while winning the bronze medal with Canada.

On April 29, 2019, McCann was named to his first Canada senior team roster for the 2019 World Championship. McCann helped Canada progress through to the playoff rounds before losing the final to Finland, finishing with the silver medal. He finished the tournament with two goals and three assists. Five years later, he rejoined Team Canada for the 2024 IIHF World Championship. During the tournament, he scored three goals for Canada, while the team itself finished fourth, losing in the bronze medal game.

== Career statistics ==
=== Regular season and playoffs ===
			Regular season					Playoffs
Season	Team	League	GP	G	A	Pts	PIM	GP	G	A	Pts	PIM
2011–12	London Nationals	GOJHL	4	1	0	1	2	4	2	1	3	0
2012–13	Sault Ste. Marie Greyhounds	OHL	64	21	23	44	35	1	0	0	0	0
2013–14	Sault Ste. Marie Greyhounds	OHL	64	27	35	62	51	9	2	5	7	4
2014–15	Sault Ste. Marie Greyhounds	OHL	56	34	47	81	27	14	6	10	16	12
2015–16	Vancouver Canucks	NHL	69	9	9	18	32	—	—	—	—	—
2016–17	Florida Panthers	NHL	29	1	6	7	4	—	—	—	—	—
2016–17	Springfield Thunderbirds	AHL	42	11	14	25	55	—	—	—	—	—
2017–18	Florida Panthers	NHL	68	9	19	28	30	—	—	—	—	—
2018–19	Florida Panthers	NHL	46	8	10	18	18	—	—	—	—	—
2018–19	Pittsburgh Penguins	NHL	32	11	6	17	13	3	0	1	1	0
2019–20	Pittsburgh Penguins	NHL	66	14	21	35	17	3	0	1	1	2
2020–21	Pittsburgh Penguins	NHL	43	14	18	32	8	6	0	1	1	2
2021–22	Seattle Kraken	NHL	74	27	23	50	33	—	—	—	—	—
2022–23	Seattle Kraken	NHL	79	40	30	70	14	8	1	2	3	6
2023–24	Seattle Kraken	NHL	80	29	33	62	31	—	—	—	—	—
2024–25	Seattle Kraken	NHL	82	22	39	61	18	—	—	—	—	—
2025–26	Seattle Kraken	NHL	52	20	20	40	11	—	—	—	—	—
NHL totals			720	204	234	438	229	20	1	5	6	10

=== International ===
Year	Team	Event	Result	GP	G	A	Pts	PIM
2013	Canada Ontario	U17	6th	5	1	2	3	2
2013	Canada	IH18	1st place, gold medalist(s)	5	1	0	1	0
2014	Canada	U18	3rd place, bronze medalist(s)	7	1	2	3	6
2019	Canada	WC	2nd place, silver medalist(s)	10	2	3	5	8
2024	Canada	WC	4th	10	3	0	3	2
Junior totals				17	3	4	7	8
Senior totals				20	5	3	8	10

== Awards and honours ==
Award	Year	Ref
Midget
Alliance Player of the Year	2012	
OHL
Second All-Rookie Team	2012–13	
CHL/NHL Top Prospects Game	2014	

Awards and achievements
Preceded by Jake Virtanen	Vancouver Canucks first-round draft pick 2014	Succeeded by Brock Boeser
