= 2019 IIHF World Championship Group B =

Group B was one of two groups of the 2019 IIHF World Championship. The four best placed teams advanced to the playoff round, while the last placed team was relegated to Division I in 2020.

== Standings ==
| Pos | Team | Pld | W | OTW | OTL | L | GF | GA | GD | Pts | Qualification or relegation |
|---|---|---|---|---|---|---|---|---|---|---|---|
| 1 | Russia | 7 | 7 | 0 | 0 | 0 | 36 | 7 | +29 | 21 | Quarterfinals |
| 2 | Czech Republic | 7 | 6 | 0 | 0 | 1 | 39 | 14 | +25 | 18 | Quarterfinals |
| 3 | Sweden | 7 | 5 | 0 | 0 | 2 | 41 | 21 | +20 | 15 | Quarterfinals |
| 4 | Switzerland | 7 | 4 | 0 | 0 | 3 | 27 | 14 | +13 | 12 | Quarterfinals |
| 5 | Latvia | 7 | 3 | 0 | 0 | 4 | 21 | 20 | +1 | 9 | |
| 6 | Norway | 7 | 2 | 0 | 0 | 5 | 19 | 33 | −14 | 6 | |
| 7 | Italy | 7 | 0 | 1 | 0 | 6 | 5 | 48 | −43 | 2 | |
| 8 | Austria (R) | 7 | 0 | 0 | 1 | 6 | 9 | 40 | −31 | 1 | Relegation to 2020 Division I A |

Source: IIHF
Rules for classification: 1) points; 2) head-to-head points; 3) head-to-head goal difference; 4) head-to-head number of goals scored; 5) result against closest best-ranked team outside tied teams; 6) result against second-best ranked team outside tied teams; 7) seeding before tournament.
(R) Relegated

== Matches ==
All times are local (UTC+2).

=== Russia vs Norway ===
| 10 May 2019; 16:15 | Russia | 5–2 (2–0, 2–0, 1–2) | Norway | Ondrej Nepela Arena, Bratislava; Attendance: 7,698 |

Game reference

Andrei Vasilevskiy
Goalies
Henrik Haukeland
Referees:
(Czech Republic) Martin Fraňo
(United States) Stephen Reneau
Linesmen:
(Switzerland) Roman Kaderli
(Czech Republic) Miroslav Lhotský

| Dadonov (Malkin, Kucherov) (PP) – 08:39 | 1–0 |
| Anisimov (Grigorenko, Orlov) – 14:33 | 2–0 |
| Kucherov (Sergachev) (PP) – 28:13 | 3–0 |
| Dadonov (Malkin, Gusev) (PP) – 29:47 | 4–0 |
| Gusev (Kucherov, Khafizullin) – 41:26 | 5–0 |
| | 5–1 | 56:07 – Valkvæ Olsen (Reichenberg) |
| | 5–2 | 57:47 – Holøs (Martinsen, Trettenes) |

6 min
Penalties
8 min
27
Shots
27

=== Czech Republic vs Sweden ===
| 10 May 2019; 20:15 | Czech Republic | 5–2 (1–0, 1–2, 3–0) | Sweden | Ondrej Nepela Arena, Bratislava; Attendance: 8,723 |

Game reference

Patrik Bartošák
Goalies
Henrik Lundqvist
Referees:
(Russia) Roman Gofman
(Canada) Brett Iverson
Linesmen:
(United States) William Hancock
(Finland) Hannu Sormunen

| Vrána (Kubalík) – 01:55 | 1–0 |
| | 1–1 | 20:24 – Hörnqvist (Nylander, E. Pettersson) |
| | 1–2 | 23:01 – Lindblom (Gustafsson, Bratt) (PP) |
| Kubalík (Kovář) – 36:36 | 2–2 |
| Frolík (Simon, Voráček) – 40:33 | 3–2 |
| Vrána (Hronek) – 55:50 | 4–2 |
| Kovář (Voráček) (EN) – 59:04 | 5–2 |

14 min
Penalties
14 min
32
Shots
32

=== Switzerland vs Italy ===
| 11 May 2019; 12:15 | Switzerland | 9–0 (4–0, 2–0, 3–0) | Italy | Ondrej Nepela Arena, Bratislava; Attendance: 8,463 |

Game reference

Reto Berra
Goalies
Andreas Bernard
Referees:
(Czech Republic) Martin Fraňo
(Sweden) Linus Öhlund
Linesmen:
(Finland) Hannu Sormunen
(Canada) Nathan Vanoosten

| Fiala (Josi) – 01:17 | 1–0 |
| Hofmann (Genazzi, Kurashev) – 07:24 | 2–0 |
| Martschini (Frick) – 10:06 | 3–0 |
| Praplan (Ambühl, Fiala) (PP) – 19:54 | 4–0 |
| S. Moser (Haas, Ambühl) – 21:36 | 5–0 |
| Fiala (Hischier) – 23:32 | 6–0 |
| Fiala (Hischier, Praplan) (PP) – 41:14 | 7–0 |
| Loeffel (Rod) – 46:55 | 8–0 |
| Hischier (Praplan) – 49:43 | 9–0 |

2 min
Penalties
8 min
61
Shots
19

=== Latvia vs Austria ===
| 11 May 2019; 16:15 | Latvia | 5–2 (1–1, 0–0, 4–1) | Austria | Ondrej Nepela Arena, Bratislava; Attendance: 8,917 |

Game reference

Kristers Gudļevskis
Goalies
David Kickert
Referees:
(Russia) Roman Gofman
(Slovakia) Peter Stano
Linesmen:
(United Kingdom) Andrew Dalton
(Switzerland) Roman Kaderli

| | 0–1 | 14:39 – M. Raffl (Pallestrang, Herburger) (SH) |
| Balcers (Dārziņš, Freibergs) (PP) – 15:21 | 1–1 |
| Dārziņš (Balcers, Bļugers) (PP) – 40:23 | 2–1 |
| Ābols (Balcers, Ķēniņš) – 44:19 | 3–1 |
| Meija (Cibuļskis, Bļugers) – 47:16 | 4–1 |
| | 4–2 | 55:44 – Herburger (Hofer, Zwerger) (PP) |
| Ķēniņš (Balcers) – 56:00 | 5–2 |

6 min
Penalties
35 min
39
Shots
18

=== Norway vs Czech Republic ===
| 11 May 2019; 20:15 | Norway | 2–7 (1–3, 0–2, 1–2) | Czech Republic | Ondrej Nepela Arena, Bratislava; Attendance: 9,033 |

Game reference

Henrik Haukeland
Henrik Holm
Goalies
Šimon Hrubec
Referees:
(Finland) Mikko Kaukokari
(Germany) Gordon Schukies
Linesmen:
(Netherlands) Joep Leermakers
(Russia) Dmitri Shishlo

| | 0–1 | 02:33 – Hronek (Voráček, Frolík) |
| | 0–2 | 06:34 – Hronek (Kubalík, Řepík) |
| Lindström (Holøs, Martinsen) (PP) – 10:14 | 1–2 |
| | 1–3 | 15:32 – Frolík (Hronek) (SH) |
| | 1–4 | 23:17 – Frolík (Voráček, Simon) (PP) |
| | 1–5 | 33:36 – Řepík (Kubalík, Hronek) |
| Olden (Olimb) – 40:52 | 2–5 |
| | 2–6 | 41:30 – Chytil (Rutta, Vrána) |
| | 2–7 | 44:52 – Kubalík (Kovář) |

8 min
Penalties
14 min
24
Shots
42

=== Russia vs Austria ===
| 12 May 2019; 12:15 | Russia | 5–0 (1–0, 2–0, 2–0) | Austria | Ondrej Nepela Arena, Bratislava; Attendance: 9,033 |

Game reference

Alexandar Georgiev
Goalies
Bernhard Starkbaum
Referees:
(Sweden) Linus Öhlund
(Germany) Gordon Schukies
Linesmen:
(Netherlands) Joep Leermakers
(Canada) Nathan Vanoosten

| Dadonov (Gusev, Kucherov) (PP) – 12:15 | 1–0 |
| Kucherov (Gusev) – 34:23 | 2–0 |
| Telegin (Kovalchuk) – 34:59 | 3–0 |
| Dadonov (Sergachev, Malkin) – 40:15 | 4–0 |
| Kovalchuk (Orlov, Kuznetsov) (EA) – 44:06 | 5–0 |

2 min
Penalties
8 min
37
Shots
15

=== Italy vs Sweden ===
| 12 May 2019; 16:15 | Italy | 0–8 (0–1, 0–1, 0–6) | Sweden | Ondrej Nepela Arena, Bratislava; Attendance: 6,984 |

Game reference

Marco De Filippo
Goalies
Henrik Lundqvist
Referees:
(United States) Stephen Reneau
(Slovakia) Peter Stano
Linesmen:
(United Kingdom) Andrew Dalton
(Russia) Dmitri Shishlo

| 0–1 | 02:10 – Lander (Bratt, Eriksson) |
| 0–2 | 25:25 – Hörnqvist (E. Pettersson, Eriksson) (PP) |
| 0–3 | 41:57 – Lindblom (A. Kempe, Nylander) (PP) |
| 0–4 | 42:52 – Krüger (Rasmussen, M. Kempe) |
| 0–5 | 48:55 – Lander (Eriksson) (SH) |
| 0–6 | 52:33 – Nylander |
| 0–7 | 55:32 – Lander (Lindholm) |
| 0–8 | 58:29 – Hörnqvist (A. Kempe) |

6 min
Penalties
4 min
13
Shots
58

=== Latvia vs Switzerland ===
| 12 May 2019; 20:15 | Latvia | 1–3 (0–0, 1–1, 0–2) | Switzerland | Ondrej Nepela Arena, Bratislava; Attendance: 7,773 |

Game reference

Elvis Merzļikins
Goalies
Leonardo Genoni
Referees:
(Canada) Brett Iverson
(Finland) Mikko Kaukokari
Linesmen:
(United States) William Hancock
(Czech Republic) Miroslav Lhotský

| | 0–1 | 33:44 – Hofmann (Kurashev, Martschini) |
| Indrašis (Balcers) (PP) – 34:15 | 1–1 |
| | 1–2 | 56:21 – Hischier (Praplan, Josi) |
| | 1–3 | 59:19 – S. Moser (EN) |

10 min
Penalties
12 min
21
Shots
37

=== Russia vs Czech Republic ===
| 13 May 2019; 16:15 | Russia | 3–0 (1–0, 1–0, 1–0) | Czech Republic | Ondrej Nepela Arena, Bratislava; Attendance: 9,085 |

Game reference

Andrei Vasilevskiy
Goalies
Patrik Bartošák
Referees:
(Canada) Brett Iverson
(Slovakia) Peter Stano
Linesmen:
(Finland) Hannu Sormunen
(Canada) Nathan Vanoosten

| Andronov (Khafizullin, Nesterov) – 13:02 | 1–0 |
| Gusev (Kucherov) – 32:35 | 2–0 |
| Zaitsev (EN) – 59:04 | 3–0 |

10 min
Penalties
16 min
28
Shots
23

=== Norway vs Sweden ===
| 13 May 2019; 20:15 | Norway | 1–9 (0–3, 0–5, 1–1) | Sweden | Ondrej Nepela Arena, Bratislava; Attendance: 8,850 |

Game reference

Henrik Haukeland
Henrik Holm
Goalies
Jacob Markström
Referees:
(Russia) Roman Gofman
(Germany) Gordon Schukies
Linesmen:
(United States) William Hancock
(Netherlands) Joep Leermakers

| | 0–1 | 00:39 – Wennberg (Nylander) |
| | 0–2 | 06:40 – Hörnqvist (Ekman-Larsson, Nylander) |
| | 0–3 | 18:22 – Hörnqvist (Nylander) |
| | 0–4 | 22:05 – A. Kempe (Lander) |
| | 0–5 | 25:54 – Ekman-Larsson (Larsson, Wennberg) |
| | 0–6 | 26:40 – M. Kempe (Lander, Gustafsson) |
| | 0–7 | 29:38 – Wennberg (Nylander) |
| | 0–8 | 38:40 – Eriksson (Lindholm, M. Pettersson) (PP) |
| Trettenes (Valkvæ Olsen) – 51:14 | 1–8 |
| | 1–9 | 57:29 – Lindblom (Nylander, Lander) |

8 min
Penalties
16 min
17
Shots
44

=== Italy vs Latvia ===
| 14 May 2019; 16:15 | Italy | 0–3 (0–0, 0–2, 0–1) | Latvia | Ondrej Nepela Arena, Bratislava; Attendance: 5,532 |

Game reference

Andreas Bernard
Goalies
Kristers Gudļevskis
Referees:
(United States) Stephen Reneau
(Germany) Gordon Schukies
Linesmen:
(United Kingdom) Andrew Dalton
(Finland) Hannu Sormunen

| 0–1 | 29:11 – Ro. Bukarts (Ri. Bukarts, Meija) |
| 0–2 | 38:14 – Marenis (Ģēģeris, Freibergs) |
| 0–3 | 59:04 – Bļugers (Balcers, Ķēniņš) (EN) |

6 min
Penalties
2 min
15
Shots
65

=== Switzerland vs Austria ===
| 14 May 2019; 20:15 | Switzerland | 4–0 (1–0, 0–0, 3–0) | Austria | Ondrej Nepela Arena, Bratislava; Attendance: 4,488 |

Game reference

Reto Berra
Goalies
David Kickert
Referees:
(Finland) Mikko Kaukokari
(Finland) Aleksi Rantala
Linesmen:
(Denmark) Rene Jensen
(Finland) Lauri Nikulainen

| Fiala (Hischier, Praplan) – 19:27 | 1–0 |
| Josi (Loeffel, S. Moser) – 53:02 | 2–0 |
| Kurashev (Hischier, Josi) (PP) – 58:34 | 3–0 |
| Andrighetto (Diaz, Praplan) (PP2) – 59:47 | 4–0 |

18 min
Penalties
28 min
45
Shots
18

=== Switzerland vs Norway ===
| 15 May 2019; 16:15 | Switzerland | 4–1 (1–0, 1–0, 2–1) | Norway | Ondrej Nepela Arena, Bratislava; Attendance: 4,673 |

Game reference

Leonardo Genoni
Goalies
Henrik Holm
Referees:
(Canada) Brett Iverson
(United States) Jeremy Tufts
Linesmen:
(United Kingdom) Andrew Dalton
(Finland) Lauri Nikulainen

| Ambühl (Bertschy, Loeffel) – 05:30 | 1–0 |
| Hischier (Fiala) – 20:34 | 2–0 |
| Hofmann (Martschini) – 49:01 | 3–0 |
| Ambühl (Genazzi, S. Moser) – 56:02 | 4–0 |
| | 4–1 | 58:04 – Lindström (Reichenberg) |

10 min
Penalties
28 min
42
Shots
32

=== Russia vs Italy ===
| 15 May 2019; 20:15 | Russia | 10–0 (4–0, 4–0, 2–0) | Italy | Ondrej Nepela Arena, Bratislava; Attendance: 7,535 |

Game reference

Andrei Vasilevskiy
Goalies
Andreas Bernard
Marco De Filippo Roia
Referees:
(Finland) Mikko Kaukokari
(Finland) Aleksi Rantala
Linesmen:
(Denmark) Rene Jensen
(Canada) Dustin McCrank

| Zaitsev (Gusev, Kucherov) – 00:31 | 1–0 |
| Khafizullin (Gusev, Kucherov) – 08:30 | 2–0 |
| Kuznetsov (Barabanov) – 13:15 | 3–0 |
| Ovechkin (Kuznetsov) – 16:14 | 4–0 |
| Kuznetsov (Ovechkin, Orlov) – 20:18 | 5–0 |
| Kovalchuk (Kuznetsov) – 26:03 | 6–0 |
| Dadonov (Kucherov, Gusev) (PP) – 33:41 | 7–0 |
| Grigorenko (Barabanov) (SH) – 36:25 | 8–0 |
| Kucherov (Khafizullin, Zaitsev) – 44:52 | 9–0 |
| Dadonov (Kovalchuk) – 45:27 | 10–0 |

4 min
Penalties
8 min
40
Shots
15

=== Sweden vs Austria ===
| 16 May 2019; 16:15 | Sweden | 9–1 (5–0, 2–0, 2–1) | Austria | Ondrej Nepela Arena, Bratislava; Attendance: 8,386 |

Game reference

Henrik Lundqvist
Goalies
Bernhard Starkbaum
Referees:
(Canada) Brett Iverson
(Slovakia) Peter Stano
Linesmen:
(United Kingdom) Andrew Dalton
(Finland) Hannu Sormunen

| Landeskog (E. Pettersson, Lindholm) – 01:09 | 1–0 |
| Krüger (Lindblom) – 02:37 | 2–0 |
| Nylander (Wennberg, Hörnqvist) – 05:41 | 3–0 |
| Larsson (Nylander) – 07:32 | 4–0 |
| A. Kempe (Lander, Ekholm) – 14:39 | 5–0 |
| Rasmussen (Krüger) (SH) – 29:13 | 6–0 |
| Lindholm (Landeskog, E. Pettersson) – 33:22 | 7–0 |
| Ekman-Larsson (Wennberg, Hörnqvist) (PP) – 42:40 | 8–0 |
| E. Pettersson (Lindholm, Landeskog) – 45:31 | 9–0 |
| | 9–1 | 47:46 – M. Raffl (Hofer, Schlacher) |

8 min
Penalties
10 min
36
Shots
22

=== Czech Republic vs Latvia ===
| 16 May 2019; 20:15 | Czech Republic | 6–3 (0–2, 4–0, 2–1) | Latvia | Ondrej Nepela Arena, Bratislava; Attendance: 9,084 |

Game reference

Patrik Bartošák
Goalies
Elvis Merzļikins
Referees:
(Canada) Oliver Gouin
(United States) Jeremy Tufts
Linesmen:
(Belarus) Dmitri Golyak
(United States) Brian Oliver

| | 0–1 | 06:04 – Indrašis (Dārziņš, Cibuļskis) (PP2) |
| | 0–2 | 13:08 – Dārziņš (Balcers, Cibuļskis) (PP) |
| Hronek (Voráček) (PP) – 25:41 | 1–2 |
| Kovář (Palát, Zámorský) – 31:01 | 2–2 |
| Voráček (Simon, Hronek) – 37:38 | 3–2 |
| Vrána (Faksa, Gudas) – 38:40 | 4–2 |
| Simon (Voráček, Frolík) – 45:44 | 5–2 |
| | 5–3 | 55:28 – Dārziņš (Cibuļskis) (PP, EA) |
| Voráček (Frolík, Simon) (EN) – 58:28 | 6–3 |

14 min
Penalties
54 min
39
Shots
24

=== Austria vs Norway ===
| 17 May 2019; 16:15 | Austria | 3–5 (0–1, 1–1, 2–3) | Norway | Ondrej Nepela Arena, Bratislava; Attendance: 8,196 |

Game reference

Bernhard Starkbaum
Goalies
Henrik Holm
Referees:
(Czech Republic) Jan Hribik
(Finland) Aleksi Rantala
Linesmen:
(Belarus) Dmitri Golyak
(Canada) Dustin McCrank

| | 0–1 | 02:01 – Bull (Lindström) |
| Schneider (Heinrich, Komarek) (PP2) – 22:08 | 1–1 |
| | 1–2 | 36:42 – Johannesen (Valkvæ Olsen, Martinsen) |
| Komarek (Pallestrang, Schneider) – 49:37 | 2–2 |
| | 2–3 | 50:33 – Reichenberg (Haga, Holøs) |
| | 2–4 | 53:22 – Bull (Olimb, Reichenberg) (EA) |
| Heinrich (Schneider, Zwerger) (EA) – 59:09 | 3–4 |
| | 3–5 | 59:17 – Bull (Lindström) (EN) |

4 min
Penalties
8 min
33
Shots
30

=== Czech Republic vs Italy ===
| 17 May 2019; 20:15 | Czech Republic | 8–0 (1–0, 4–0, 3–0) | Italy | Ondrej Nepela Arena, Bratislava; Attendance: 9,082 |

Game reference

Pavel Francouz
Goalies
Marco De Filippo
Referees:
(Canada) Oliver Gouin
(Russia) Yevgeni Romasko
Linesmen:
(Russia) Gleb Lazarev
(Finland) Lauri Nikulainen

| Gulaš (Kubalík) – 07:04 | 1–0 |
| Gudas (Jaškin) – 27:09 | 2–0 |
| Frolík (Moravčík, Simon) – 32:07 | 3–0 |
| Kovář (Voráček, Frolík) (PP) – 33:43 | 4–0 |
| Jaškin (Chytil, Řepík) – 34:17 | 5–0 |
| Simon (Voráček, Frolík) – 56:02 | 6–0 |
| Jaškin (Musil, Řepík) – 57:42 | 7–0 |
| Michael (Kolář) – 57:58 | 8–0 |

2 min
Penalties
6 min
48
Shots
15

=== Latvia vs Russia ===
| 18 May 2019; 12:15 | Latvia | 1–3 (1–0, 0–3, 0–0) | Russia | Ondrej Nepela Arena, Bratislava; Attendance: 9,084 |

Game reference

Elvis Merzļikins
Goalies
Andrei Vasilevskiy
Referees:
(Czech Republic) Jan Hribik
(Belarus) Maxim Sidorenko
Linesmen:
(Belarus) Dmitri Golyak
(United States) Brian Oliver

| Cibuļskis (Indrašis) (PP) – 10:28 | 1–0 |
| | 1–1 | 20:27 – Orlov (Kovalchuk, Plotnikov) |
| | 1–2 | 23:50 – Gusev (Dadonov, Kucherov) (PP) |
| | 1–3 | 32:40 – Kucherov (Anisimov) |

12 min
Penalties
18 min
27
Shots
33

=== Italy vs Norway ===
| 18 May 2019; 16:15 | Italy | 1–7 (0–1, 0–0, 1–6) | Norway | Ondrej Nepela Arena, Bratislava; Attendance: 8,872 |

Game reference

Andreas Bernard
Goalies
Henrik Holm
Referees:
(Russia) Yevgeni Romasko
(United States) Jeremy Tufts
Linesmen:
(Canada) Dustin McCrank
(Finland) Lauri Nikulainen

| | 0–1 | 15:23 – Reichenberg (Lesund, Martinsen) |
| | 0–2 | 41:47 – Trettenes (Olimb, Valkvæ Olsen) |
| Miceli (Helfer, S. Kostner) – 42:013 | 1–2 |
| | 1–3 | 43:55 – Haga (Valkvæ Olsen, Bonsaksen) |
| | 1–4 | 47:45 – Lindström (Martinsen) |
| | 1–5 | 49:06 – Olden (Holøs, Olimb) |
| | 1–6 | 51:39 – Røymark |
| | 1–7 | 59:08 – Espeland (Bull, Haga) (PP) |

4 min
Penalties
8 min
20
Shots
35

=== Sweden vs Switzerland ===
| 18 May 2019; 20:15 | Sweden | 4–3 (1–1, 2–1, 1–1) | Switzerland | Ondrej Nepela Arena, Bratislava; Attendance: 9,085 |

Game reference

Henrik Lundqvist
Goalies
Reto Berra
Referees:
(Canada) Oliver Gouin
(Austria) Manuel Nikolic
Linesmen:
(Denmark) Rene Jensen
(Czech Republic) Jiří Ondráček

| | 0–1 | 04:09 – Andrighetto (Haas) |
| Wennberg (Klingberg) (PP) – 18:44 | 1–1 |
| Nylander (Hörnqvist, Larsson) – 25:20 | 2–1 |
| | 2–2 | 27:58 – Genazzi (Josi) |
| Gustafsson (Nylander) – 28:28 | 3–2 |
| | 3–3 | 50:27 – Haas (Scherwey, Bertschy) |
| Ekman-Larsson (Nylander, Wennberg) – 51:47 | 4–3 |

12 min
Penalties
6 min
29
Shots
24

=== Austria vs Czech Republic ===
| 19 May 2019; 16:15 | Austria | 0–8 (0–2, 0–3, 0–3) | Czech Republic | Ondrej Nepela Arena, Bratislava; Attendance: 9,072 |

Game reference

Lukas Herzog
Goalies
Pavel Francouz
Referees:
(Finland) Aleksi Rantala
(Belarus) Maxim Sidorenko
Linesmen:
(Denmark) Rene Jensen
(Canada) Dustin McCrank

| 0–1 | 06:30 – Faksa (Kolář, Gudas) |
| 0–2 | 14:30 – Kubalík (Gudas) |
| 0–3 | 20:41 – Simon (Voráček, Hronek) |
| 0–4 | 30:14 – Řepík (Faksa, Kubalík) (PP2) |
| 0–5 | 30:55 – Frolík (Gulaš, Hronek) (PP2) |
| 0–6 | 42:26 – Řepík (Kubalík, Kolář) |
| 0–7 | 44:06 – Kolář (Voráček, Frolík) |
| 0–8 | 45:01 – Vrána (Jaškin, Faksa) |

10 min
Penalties
16 min
16
Shots
39

=== Switzerland vs Russia ===
| 19 May 2019; 20:15 | Switzerland | 0–3 (0–1, 0–1, 0–1) | Russia | Ondrej Nepela Arena, Bratislava; Attendance: 9,056 |

Game reference

Leonardo Genoni
Goalies
Alexandar Georgiev
Referees:
(Sweden) Tobias Bjork
(United States) Jeremy Tufts
Linesmen:
(Sweden) Andreas Malmqvist
(United States) Brian Oliver

| 0–1 | 03:36 – Anisimov (Orlov, Gusev) |
| 0–2 | 26:20 – Kucherov (Dadonov, Gusev) (PP) |
| 0–3 | 55:20 – Kucherov (Anisimov, Zaitsev) |

8 min
Penalties
14 min
31
Shots
34

=== Sweden vs Latvia ===
| 20 May 2019; 16:15 | Sweden | 5–4 (1–0, 1–1, 3–3) | Latvia | Ondrej Nepela Arena, Bratislava; Attendance: 9,085 |

Game reference

Henrik Lundqvist
Goalies
Kristers Gudļevskis
Elvis Merzļikins
Referees:
(Finland) Aleksi Rantala
(Russia) Yevgeni Romasko
Linesmen:
(Denmark) Rene Jensen
(Finland) Lauri Nikulainen

| E. Pettersson (Landeskog, Lindholm) (PP) – 10:15 | 1–0 |
| | 1–1 | 29:35 – Ro. Bukarts (Ri. Bukarts, Freibergs) (PP) |
| A. Kempe (Nylander, Klingberg) – 33:38 | 2–1 |
| | 2–2 | 41:11 – Ro. Bukarts (PP) |
| | 2–3 | 43:42 – Jaks (Ri. Bukarts, Dārziņš) |
| Lander (A. Kempe) – 49:00 | 3–3 |
| Hörnqvist (Ekholm, Nylander) – 50:09 | 4–3 |
| | 4–4 | 56:36 – Ro. Bukarts (Indrašis, Sotnieks) |
| Rasmussen (EN) – 59:26 | 5–4 |

6 min
Penalties
6 min
35
Shots
29

=== Austria vs Italy ===
| 20 May 2019; 20:15 | Austria | 3–4 GWS (2–1, 0–2, 1–0) (OT: 0–0) (SO: 0–1) | Italy | Ondrej Nepela Arena, Bratislava; Attendance: 9,085 |

Game reference

David Kickert
Goalies
Andreas Bernard
Referees:
(Czech Republic) Jan Hribik
(United States) Jeremy Tufts
Linesmen:
(Russia) Gleb Lazarev
(Czech Republic) Jiří Ondráček

| | 0–1 | 09:59 – Bardaro (Trivellato) |
| Ganahl (Unterweger) – 11:25 | 1–1 |
| M. Raffl (Hofer, Unterweger) – 16:08 | 2–1 |
| | 2–2 | 34:35 – S. Kostner (Miceli) |
| | 2–3 | 38:57 – Rosa (Ramoser) |
| M. Raffl (Hofer) – 41:45 | 3–3 |

Ganahl (miss)
Komarek
M. Raffl (miss)
Heinrich (miss)
Rauchenwald
Komarek (miss)
Schneider (miss)
Shootout
(miss) McMonagle
(miss) Bardaro
Miceli
(miss) Hofer
Rosa
(miss) Miceli
McMonagle
4 min
Penalties
6 min
41
Shots
23

=== Czech Republic vs Switzerland ===
| 21 May 2019; 12:15 | Czech Republic | 5–4 (1–1, 3–1, 1–2) | Switzerland | Ondrej Nepela Arena, Bratislava; Attendance: 9,085 |

Game reference

Patrik Bartošák
Goalies
Reto Berra
Robert Mayer
Referees:
(Sweden) Tobias Bjork
(Russia) Yevgeni Romasko
Linesmen:
(Belarus) Dmitri Golyak
(United States) Brian Oliver

| | 0–1 | 02:13 – Frick (Martschini, Scherwey) |
| Voráček (Kovář, Frolík) (PP) – 12:21 | 1–1 |
| Simon (Voráček, Hronek) – 20:38 | 2–1 |
| Frolík (Voráček, Simon) – 26:20 | 3–1 |
| | 3–2 | 26:49 – Scherwey (Martschini, Kurashev) |
| Kubalík (Simon) – 28:27 | 4–2 |
| | 4–3 | 41:47 – Scherwey (Weber, Martschini) |
| | 4–4 | 56:19 – Niederreiter (Josi, Hischier) |
| Rutta (EN) – 58:33 | 5–4 |

14 min
Penalties
14 min
26
Shots
40

=== Norway vs Latvia ===
| 21 May 2019; 16:15 | Norway | 1–4 (1–0, 0–1, 0–3) | Latvia | Ondrej Nepela Arena, Bratislava; Attendance: 8,965 |

Game reference

Henrik Haukeland
Goalies
Elvis Merzļikins
Referees:
(Austria) Manuel Nikolic
(Finland) Aleksi Rantala
Linesmen:
(Russia) Gleb Lazarev
(Sweden) Andreas Malmqvist

| Lindström (Holøs, Martinsen) (PP) – 15:18 | 1–0 |
| | 1–1 | 22:43 – Indrašis (Balcers, Bļugers) (PP) |
| | 1–2 | 46:59 – Jaks (Balinskis, Indrašis) |
| | 1–3 | 47:55 – Marenis (Kulda, Balcers) |
| | 1–4 | 54:13 – Ķēniņš (Indrašis) |

4 min
Penalties
6 min
20
Shots
38

=== Sweden vs Russia ===
| 21 May 2019; 20:15 | Sweden | 4–7 (1–0, 0–6, 3–1) | Russia | Ondrej Nepela Arena, Bratislava; Attendance: 9,085 |

Game reference

Jacob Markström
Goalies
Andrei Vasilevskiy
Referees:
(Canada) Oliver Gouin
(Czech Republic) Jan Hribik
Linesmen:
(Canada) Dustin McCrank
(Czech Republic) Jiří Ondráček

| Landeskog (M. Pettersson, E. Pettersson) – 07:32 | 1–0 |
| | 1–1 | 20:57 – Anisimov (Gusev, Kucherov) |
| | 1–2 | 24:10 – Dadonov (Sergachev, Kuznetsov) |
| | 1–3 | 28:52 – Ovechkin (Malkin, Khafizullin) |
| | 1–4 | 34:39 – Kaprizov |
| | 1–5 | 37:17 – Grigorenko |
| | 1–6 | 37:47 – Malkin (Zadorov, Dadonov) |
| Nylander (Wennberg) – 52:02 | 2–6 |
| | 2–7 | 52:57 – Orlov (Barabanov, Telegin) |
| Ekman-Larsson (E. Pettersson) – 56:22 | 3–7 |
| Klingberg (Ekman-Larsson, Nylander) (PP) – 58:49 | 4–7 |

12 min
Penalties
6 min
37
Shots
34
