= Dinar Khafizullin =

Russian ice hockey player (born 1989)

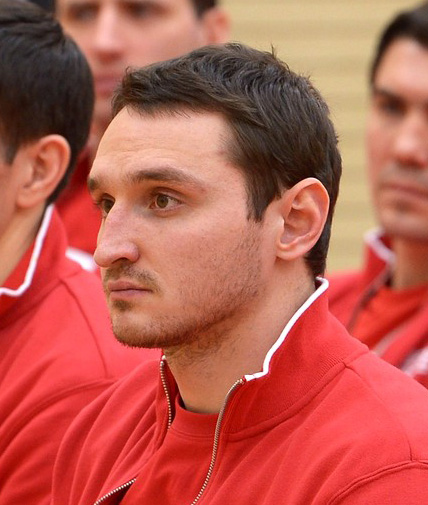
- Born: 5 January 1989 (age 37) Kazan, Russian SFSR, Soviet Union
- Height: 5 ft 11 in (180 cm)
- Weight: 185 lb (84 kg; 13 st 3 lb)
- Position: Defence
- Shot: Left
- Played for: Ak Bars Kazan; HC Vityaz; SKA Saint Petersburg; Salavat Yulaev Ufa; Neftekhimik Nizhnekamsk
- National team: Russia
- Playing career: 2007–2026

Dinar Ramilevich Khafizullin (Russian: Динар Рамилевич Хафизуллин) (born 5 January 1989) is a Russian former professional ice hockey defenceman who played in the Kontinental Hockey League (KHL).

== Playing career ==
Khafizullin made his Kontinental Hockey League debut playing with Ak Bars Kazan during the 2010–11 KHL season. During his fourth season with HC Vityaz in 2013–14, Khafizullin was traded at the deadline to contending club, SKA Saint Petersburg in exchange for Georgy Berdyukov on 16 January 2014.

Following eight seasons with SKA Saint Petersburg, and following pre-season leading into the 2021–22 season, Khafizullin was traded to Salavat Yulaev Ufa in exchange for Mikhail Vorobyev on 28 August 2021.

On 4 May 2022, Khafizullin signed a two-year contract as a free agent to return to his original KHL club, Ak Bars Kazan. In the 2022–23 season, Khafizullin contributed with 10 assist from the blueline in 41 regular season games.

After completing the first season of his contract with Ak Bars, Khafizullin opted to return to previous club, Salavat Yulaev Ufa, to play the remaining year of contract on 14 July 2023.

Prior to the 2025–26 season, Khafizullin left Salavat as a free agent and was signed to a one-year contract with HC Neftekhimik Nizhnekamsk on 31 July 2025.

== Career statistics ==
=== Regular season and playoffs ===
			Regular season					Playoffs
Season	Team	League	GP	G	A	Pts	PIM	GP	G	A	Pts	PIM
2006–07	Ak Bars Kazan	RSL	1	0	0	0	0	—	—	—	—	—
2007–08	Neftyanik Almetievsk	RUS2	59	1	8	9	116	7	0	1	1	10
2008–09	Neftyanik Almetievsk	RUS2	32	2	3	5	24	8	0	1	1	6
2009–10	Neftyanik Almetievsk	RUS2	34	1	4	5	28	10	0	1	1	33
2010–11	HC Vityaz	KHL	44	3	9	12	46	—	—	—	—	—
2010–11	Ak Bars Kazan	KHL	3	0	0	0	2	—	—	—	—	—
2011–12	HC Vityaz	KHL	50	0	5	5	26	—	—	—	—	—
2012–13	HC Vityaz	KHL	46	3	8	11	12	—	—	—	—	—
2013–14	HC Vityaz	KHL	45	5	9	14	14	—	—	—	—	—
2013–14	SKA Saint Petersburg	KHL	8	1	3	4	0	9	0	2	2	29
2014–15	SKA Saint Petersburg	KHL	39	2	8	10	12	18	0	0	0	8
2015–16	SKA Saint Petersburg	KHL	37	1	7	8	12	14	1	1	2	8
2016–17	SKA Saint Petersburg	KHL	46	3	15	18	37	18	3	3	6	8
2017–18	SKA Saint Petersburg	KHL	43	4	12	16	20	9	0	1	1	0
2018–19	SKA Saint Petersburg	KHL	49	7	14	21	37	15	2	6	8	2
2019–20	SKA Saint Petersburg	KHL	29	0	7	7	10	4	0	0	0	0
2020–21	SKA Saint Petersburg	KHL	41	1	5	6	12	16	0	2	2	2
2021–22	Salavat Yulaev Ufa	KHL	34	2	5	7	12	11	1	4	5	8
2022–23	Ak Bars Kazan	KHL	41	0	10	10	14	4	0	0	0	6
2023–24	Salavat Yulaev Ufa	KHL	62	4	21	25	18	6	0	1	1	0
2024–25	Salavat Yulaev Ufa	KHL	65	0	24	24	16	19	2	5	7	2
2025–26	Neftekhimik Nizhnekamsk	KHL	53	0	4	4	23	5	0	2	2	2
KHL totals			736	36	166	202	323	148	9	27	36	75

Medal record

Ice hockey

Representing Russia

World Championships
Bronze medal – third place	2019 Slovakia	

World Junior Championships
Bronze medal – third place	2009 Canada	

=== International ===
Year	Team	Event	Result	GP	G	A	Pts	PIM
2009	Russia	WJC	3rd place, bronze medalist(s)	2	0	0	0	0
2018	Russia	WC	6th	6	0	3	3	4
2019	Russia	WC	3rd place, bronze medalist(s)	10	1	4	5	2
Junior totals				2	0	0	0	0
Senior totals				16	1	7	8	6

== Awards and honors ==
Award	Year
KHL
Gagarin Cup (SKA Saint Petersburg)	2015, 2017
