= Rihards Marenis =

Latvian ice hockey player

- Born: 18 April 1993 (age 32) Riga, Latvia
- Height: 6 ft 1 in (185 cm)
- Weight: 201 lb (91 kg; 14 st 5 lb)
- Position: Forward
- Shoots: Left
- Allsv team Former teams: Modo Hockey; Dinamo Riga; HC Vita Hästen
- National team: Latvia
- NHL draft: Undrafted
- Playing career: 2016–present

Rihards Marenis (born 18 April 1993) is a Latvian professional ice hockey player currently playing with Eispiraten Crimmitschau in the DEL 2 and the Latvian national team. He formerly played with Dinamo Riga in the Kontinental Hockey League (KHL)

He represented Latvia at the 2019, 2021, and 2022 IIHF World Championships.
