= 2019 IIHF World Championship =

2019 edition of the Men's World Ice Hockey Championships

Tournament details
- Host country: Slovakia
- Venues: 2 (in 2 host cities)
- Dates: 10–26 May
- Opened by: Andrej Kiska
- Teams: 16

Final positions
- Champions: Finland (3rd title)
- Runners-up: Canada
- Third place: Russia
- Fourth place: Czech Republic

Tournament statistics
- Games played: 64
- Goals scored: 412 (6.44 per game)
- Attendance: 470,853 (7,357 per game)
- Scoring leader: (Sweden) William Nylander (18 points)

Awards
- MVP: (Canada) Mark Stone

The 2019 IIHF World Championship was hosted from 10 to 26 May 2019 by Slovakia. It was the second time that Slovakia has hosted the event as an independent country, as was the case in 2011. The host cities were Bratislava and Košice, as announced by the International Ice Hockey Federation (IIHF) on 15 May 2015 in Prague, Czech Republic.

Finland won their third title by defeating Canada in the final. The Finns had 18 first-timers for the 2019 IIHF World Championship and were widely regarded as an outsider to win any medal at all. Despite this, the Finns won their third World Championship and lost only two games in the tournament (against the USA, and Germany). Russia secured the bronze medal after a penalty-shootout win over the Czech Republic. This tournament was also the first time since the 2006 IIHF World Championship that both promoted teams (Great Britain and Italy) stayed in the top division.

== Venues ==
Bratislava	2019 IIHF World Championship is located in Slovakia	Košice
Ondrej Nepela Arena	2019 IIHF World Championship is located in Slovakia	Steel Arena
48°08′38″N 17°06′35″E	2019 IIHF World Championship is located in Slovakia	48°43′16″N 21°15′27″E
Capacity: 10,055	2019 IIHF World Championship is located in Slovakia	Capacity: 8,347

== Rule changes ==
In December 2018, the IIHF announced changes to the overtime procedures beginning at this tournament: all overtime periods would be 3-on-3 regardless of round (rather than progressing from 3-on-3 to 4-on-4 and 5-on-5 over the course of the tournament), and the gold medal game would no longer go to a shootout; play would continue in 20-minute periods of 3-on-3 until a winning goal would be scored.

In the semifinals, there was no set bracket. After the quarterfinals, a re-seeding took place with the highest seed playing the lowest remaining seed. Seeds were determined by performance in the preliminary round.

== Participants ==
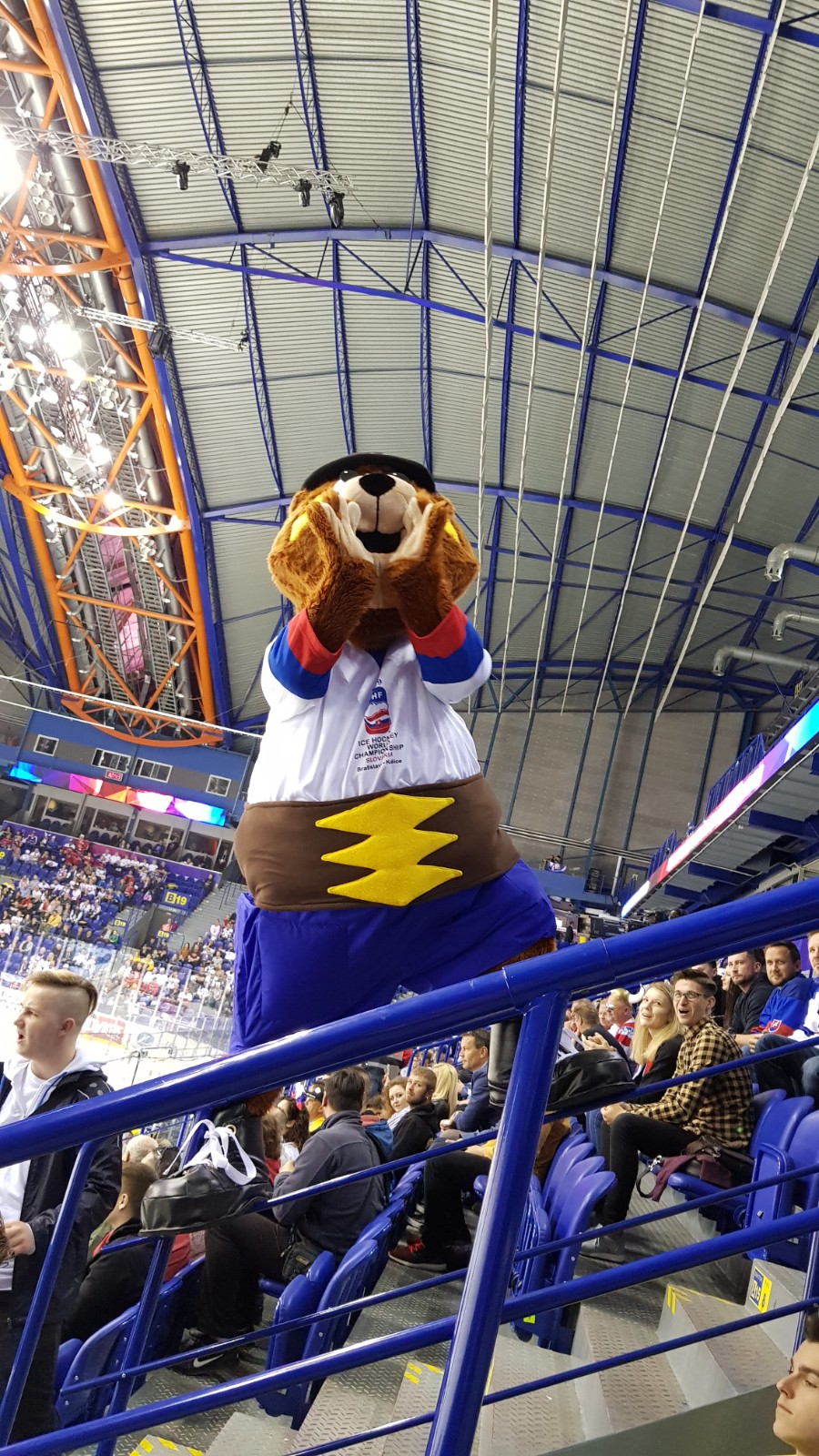
Macejko, was the mascot for the tournament.

Qualified as host

- Slovakia

Automatic qualifier after a top 14 placement at the 2018 IIHF World Championship

- Austria
- Canada
- Czech Republic
- Denmark
- Finland
- France
- Germany
- Latvia
- Norway
- Russia
- Sweden
- Switzerland
- United States

Qualified through winning a promotion at the 2018 IIHF World Championship Division I

- Great Britain
- Italy

== Seeding ==
The seedings in the preliminary round are based on the 2018 IIHF World Ranking, as of the end of the 2018 IIHF World Championship, using the serpentine system. On 22 May 2018, the IIHF and the local organizing committee announced the groups, in which Slovakia and Norway switched places so that Slovakia would play in Košice and the Czech Republic and Austria would play in Bratislava.

Group A (Košice)

- Canada (1)
- United States (4)
- Finland (5)
- Germany (8)
- Slovakia (10)
- Denmark (12)
- France (13)
- Great Britain (22)

Group B (Bratislava)

- Sweden (2)
- Russia (3)
- Czech Republic (6)
- Switzerland (7)
- Norway (9)
- Latvia (11)
- Austria (17)
- Italy (19)

== Rosters ==
Each team's roster consists of at least 15 skaters (forwards, and defencemen) and 2 goaltenders, and at most 22 skaters and 3 goaltenders. All 16 participating nations, through the confirmation of their respective national associations, had to submit a "Long List" no later than two weeks before the tournament, and a final roster by the Passport Control meeting prior to the start of the tournament.

== Officials ==
16 referees and linesman were announced on 1 March 2019.

Referees	Linesmen
(Austria) Manuel Nikolic; (Belarus) Maxim Sidorenko; (Canada) Oliver Gouin; (Canada) Brett Iverson; (Czech Republic) Jan Hribik; (Czech Republic) Martin Fraňo; (Finland) Mikko Kaukokari; (Finland) Aleksi Rantala; (Germany) Gordon Schukies; (Russia) Roman Gofman; (Russia) Yevgeni Romasko; (Slovakia) Peter Stano; (Sweden) Linus Öhlund; (Sweden) Tobias Bjork; (United States) Stephen Reneau; (United States) Jeremy Tufts	(Belarus) Dmitri Golyak; (Canada) Dustin McCrank; (Canada) Nathan Vanoosten; (Czech Republic) Jiří Ondráček; (Czech Republic) Miroslav Lhotský; (Denmark) Rene Jensen; (Finland) Hannu Sormunen; (Finland) Lauri Nikulainen; (United Kingdom) Andrew Dalton; (Netherlands) Joep Leermakers; (Russia) Dmitri Shishlo; (Russia) Gleb Lazarev; (Switzerland) Roman Kaderli; (Sweden) Andreas Malmqvist; (United States) William Hancock; (United States) Brian Oliver

== Preliminary round ==
The schedule was announced on 15 August 2018.

=== Group A ===
Group A matches were played at the Steel Arena in Košice.

Pos	Team	Pld	W	OTW	OTL	L	GF	GA	GD	Pts	Qualification or relegation
1	Canada	7	6	0	0	1	36	11	+25	18	Quarterfinals
2	Finland	7	5	0	1	1	22	11	+11	16	Quarterfinals
3	Germany	7	5	0	0	2	18	18	0	15	Quarterfinals
4	United States	7	4	1	0	2	27	15	+12	14	Quarterfinals
5	Slovakia (H)	7	3	1	0	3	28	19	+9	11	
6	Denmark	7	1	1	1	4	18	23	−5	6	
7	Great Britain	7	0	1	0	6	9	41	−32	2 (Note: France 3–4 (OT) Great Britain)	
8	France (R)	7	0	0	2	5	14	34	−20	2	Relegation to 2020 Division I A

Source: IIHF
Rules for classification: 1) points; 2) head-to-head points; 3) head-to-head goal difference; 4) head-to-head number of goals scored; 5) result against closest best-ranked team outside tied teams; 6) result against second-best ranked team outside tied teams; 7) seeding before tournament.
(H) Host; (R) Relegated
Notes:

10 May 2019
Finland	3–1	Canada
United States	1–4	Slovakia
11 May 2019
Denmark	5–4 (GWS)	France
Germany	3–1	Great Britain
Slovakia	2–4	Finland
12 May 2019
United States	7–1	France
Denmark	1–2	Germany
Great Britain	0–8	Canada
13 May 2019
United States	3–2 (OT)	Finland
Slovakia	5–6	Canada
14 May 2019
Great Britain	0–9	Denmark
Germany	4–1	France
15 May 2019
United States	6–3	Great Britain
Germany	3–2	Slovakia
16 May 2019
Canada	5–2	France
Finland	3–1	Denmark
17 May 2019
France	3–6	Slovakia
Finland	5–0	Great Britain
18 May 2019
Denmark	1–7	United States
Canada	8–1	Germany
Great Britain	1–7	Slovakia
19 May 2019
Germany	1–3	United States
France	0–3	Finland
20 May 2019
France	3–4 (OT)	Great Britain
Canada	5–0	Denmark
21 May 2019
Finland	2–4	Germany
Slovakia	2–1 (GWS)	Denmark
Canada	3–0	United States

=== Group B ===
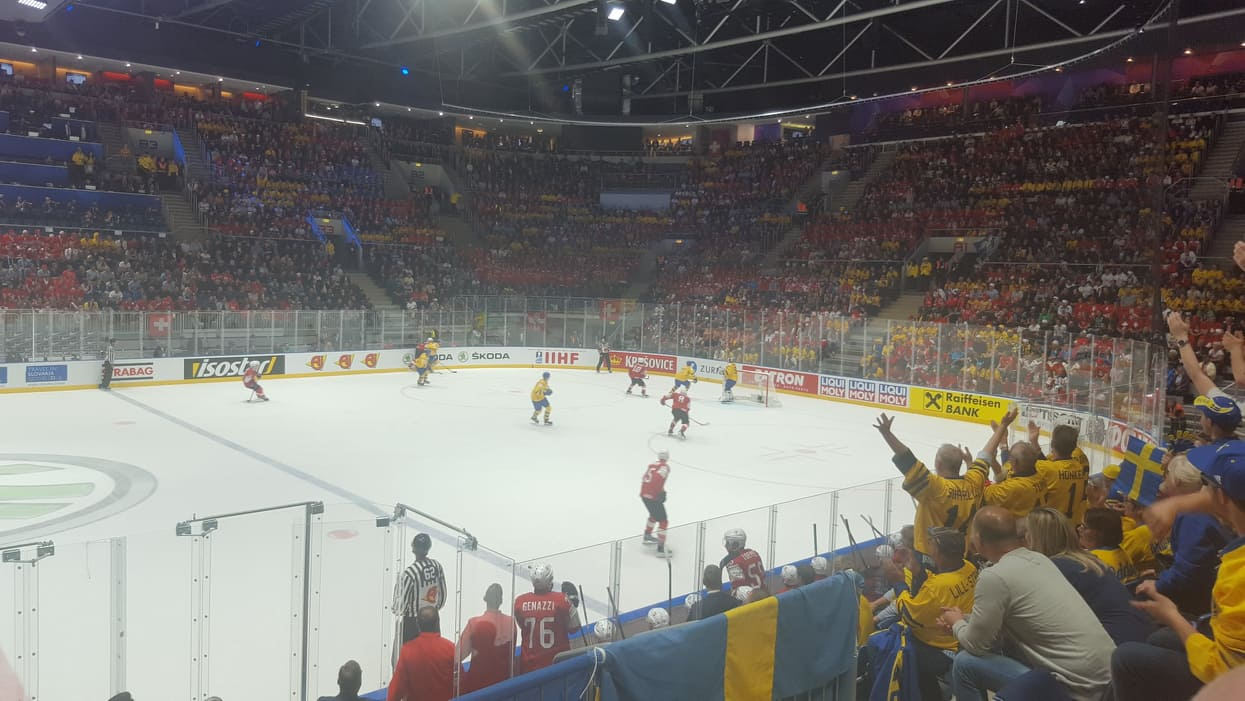
Sweden - Switzerland

Group B matches were played at the Ondrej Nepela Arena in Bratislava.

Pos	Team	Pld	W	OTW	OTL	L	GF	GA	GD	Pts	Qualification or relegation
1	Russia	7	7	0	0	0	36	7	+29	21	Quarterfinals
2	Czech Republic	7	6	0	0	1	39	14	+25	18	Quarterfinals
3	Sweden	7	5	0	0	2	41	21	+20	15	Quarterfinals
4	Switzerland	7	4	0	0	3	27	14	+13	12	Quarterfinals
5	Latvia	7	3	0	0	4	21	20	+1	9	
6	Norway	7	2	0	0	5	19	33	−14	6	
7	Italy	7	0	1	0	6	5	48	−43	2	
8	Austria (R)	7	0	0	1	6	9	40	−31	1	Relegation to 2020 Division I A

Source: IIHF
Rules for classification: 1) points; 2) head-to-head points; 3) head-to-head goal difference; 4) head-to-head number of goals scored; 5) result against closest best-ranked team outside tied teams; 6) result against second-best ranked team outside tied teams; 7) seeding before tournament.
(R) Relegated

10 May 2019
Russia	5–2	Norway
Czech Republic	5–2	Sweden
11 May 2019
Switzerland	9–0	Italy
Latvia	5–2	Austria
Norway	2–7	Czech Republic
12 May 2019
Russia	5–0	Austria
Italy	0–8	Sweden
Latvia	1–3	Switzerland
13 May 2019
Russia	3–0	Czech Republic
Norway	1–9	Sweden
14 May 2019
Italy	0–3	Latvia
Switzerland	4–0	Austria
15 May 2019
Switzerland	4–1	Norway
Russia	10–0	Italy
16 May 2019
Sweden	9–1	Austria
Czech Republic	6–3	Latvia
17 May 2019
Austria	3–5	Norway
Czech Republic	8–0	Italy
18 May 2019
Latvia	1–3	Russia
Italy	1–7	Norway
Sweden	4–3	Switzerland
19 May 2019
Austria	0–8	Czech Republic
Switzerland	0–3	Russia
20 May 2019
Sweden	5–4	Latvia
Austria	3–4 (GWS)	Italy
21 May 2019
Czech Republic	5–4	Switzerland
Norway	1–4	Latvia
Sweden	4–7	Russia

== Playoff round ==
=== Seeding order ===
The semi-final pairings were determined according to the seeding after the preliminary round. The seeding is determined by following criteria in the order presented:

1. higher position in the group;
2. higher number of points;
3. better goal difference;
4. higher number of goals scored for;
5. better seeding number entering the tournament (i.e., place in the 2018 IIHF World Ranking).

Rank	Team	Grp	Pos	GP	Pts	GD	GF	Seed
1	Russia	B	1	7	21	+29	36	3
2	Canada	A	1	7	18	+25	36	1
3	Czech Republic	B	2	7	18	+25	39	6
4	Finland	A	2	7	16	+11	22	5
5	Sweden	B	3	7	15	+20	41	2
6	Germany	A	3	7	15	0	18	8
7	United States	A	4	7	14	+12	27	4
8	Switzerland	B	4	7	12	+13	27	7

=== Bracket ===
Quarterfinals
23 May
Canada (OT)	3
Switzerland	2
23 May
Czech Republic	5
Germany	1
23 May
Russia	4
United States	3
23 May
Finland (OT)	5
Sweden	4

Semifinals
25 May
Canada	5
Czech Republic	1
25 May
Russia	0
Finland	1

Final
26 May
Canada	1
Finland	3
Third place
26 May
Russia (GWS)	3
Czech Republic	2

=== Quarterfinals ===
23 May 2019; 16:15	Canada	3–2 OT (0–1, 1–1, 1–0) (OT: 1–0)	Switzerland	Steel Aréna, Košice; Attendance: 6,157

Game reference

Matt Murray
Goalies
Leonardo Genoni
Referees:
(Czech Republic) Martin Fraňo
(Finland) Aleksi Rantala
Linesmen:
(Czech Republic) Miroslav Lhotský
(Finland) Hannu Sormunen

	0–1	18:06 – Andrighetto (Diaz, Fiala) (PP)
Stone (Fabbro, Dubois) – 25:45	1–1
	1–2	39:57 – Hischier (Martschini, Niederreiter) (PP)
Severson (Stone) (EA) – 59:59	2–2
Stone (Dubois, Theodore) – 65:07	3–2

6 min
Penalties
2 min
42
Shots
24

23 May 2019; 16:15	Russia	4–3 (2–0, 0–1, 2–2)	United States	Ondrej Nepela Arena, Bratislava; Attendance: 9,085

Game reference

Andrei Vasilevskiy
Goalies
Cory Schneider
Referees:
(Sweden) Tobias Bjork
(Canada) Oliver Gouin
Linesmen:
(Sweden) Andreas Malmqvist
(Czech Republic) Jiří Ondráček

Gusev (Sergachev, Kucherov) – 01:07	1–0
Sergachev (Gusev) (PP) – 15:47	2–0
	2–1	22:22 – Skjei (Kane, Gaudreau)
Kaprizov (Gusev, Sergachev) – 41:31	3–1
	3–2	45:53 – Hanifin (J. Hughes)
Grigorenko (Malkin, Dadonov) – 47:02	4–2
	4–3	57:10 – DeBrincat (Kane, J. Hughes) (EA)

2 min
Penalties
2 min
43
Shots
32

23 May 2019; 20:15	Finland	5–4 OT (1–2, 2–2, 1–0) (OT: 1–0)	Sweden	Steel Aréna, Košice; Attendance: 6,304

Game reference

Kevin Lankinen
Goalies
Henrik Lundqvist
Referees:
(Russia) Roman Gofman
(Canada) Brett Iverson
Linesmen:
(United States) William Hancock
(Russia) Dmitri Shishlo

Mikkola (Pesonen, Manninen) – 01:00	1–0
	1–1	02:38 – Klingberg (Nylander, Wennberg) (PP)
	1–2	16:57 – Hörnqvist (Ekman-Larsson, Larsson)
	1–3	20:25 – E. Pettersson (Landeskog, Ekman-Larsson)
Lindbohm (Manninen, Pesonen) – 25:04	2–3
Hakanpää (Manninen) – 29:08	3–3
	3–4	39:35 – Gustafsson (Landeskog, Wennberg)
Anttila (Ojamäki, Lehtonen) (EA) – 58:31	4–4
Manninen (Lankinen) – 61:37	5–4

4 min
Penalties
0 min
32
Shots
18

23 May 2019; 20:15	Czech Republic	5–1 (0–0, 1–1, 4–0)	Germany	Ondrej Nepela Arena, Bratislava; Attendance: 9,085

Game reference

Patrik Bartošák
Goalies
Philipp Grubauer
Referees:
(Sweden) Linus Öhlund
(United States) Jeremy Tufts
Linesmen:
(Belarus) Dmitri Golyak
(Finland) Lauri Nikulainen

Kovář – 33:41	1–0
	1–1	37:46 – Mauer (Tiffels)
Voráček (Simon) – 44:19	2–1
Kubalík (Kovář, Hronek) – 51:41	3–1
Palát (Kolář) – 53:08	4–1
Kovář (Moravčík) (EN) – 59:54	5–1

6 min
Penalties
6 min
34
Shots
22

=== Semifinals ===
25 May 2019; 15:15	Russia	0–1 (0–0, 0–0, 0–1)	Finland	Ondrej Nepela Arena, Bratislava; Attendance: 9,085

Game reference
Andrei Vasilevskiy	Goalies	Kevin Lankinen	Referees: (Sweden) Tobias Bjork (Czech Republic) Martin Fraňo; Linesmen: (United States) Brian Oliver (Canada) Nathan Vanoosten
0–1 / 50:18 – Anttila (Jokiharju, Kiviranta)			Referees: (Sweden) Tobias Bjork (Czech Republic) Martin Fraňo; Linesmen: (United States) Brian Oliver (Canada) Nathan Vanoosten
6 min	Penalties	4 min	Referees: (Sweden) Tobias Bjork (Czech Republic) Martin Fraňo; Linesmen: (United States) Brian Oliver (Canada) Nathan Vanoosten
32	Shots	29	Referees: (Sweden) Tobias Bjork (Czech Republic) Martin Fraňo; Linesmen: (United States) Brian Oliver (Canada) Nathan Vanoosten

25 May 2019; 19:15	Canada	5–1 (1–0, 2–0, 2–1)	Czech Republic	Ondrej Nepela Arena, Bratislava; Attendance: 9,085

Game reference

Matt Murray
Goalies
Patrik Bartošák
Pavel Francouz
Referees:
(Finland) Mikko Kaukokari
(United States) Jeremy Tufts
Linesmen:
(Russia) Gleb Lazarev
(Finland) Hannu Sormunen

Stone (Stecher) – 05:18	1–0
Nurse (Couturier) – 20:10	2–0
Dubois (Marchessault, Stone) – 25:06	3–0
Turris (Mantha) – 46:26	4–0
Chabot (Henrique, Strome) – 53:00	5–0
	5–1	53:59 – Zohorna (Kolář)

12 min
Penalties
6 min
30
Shots
41

=== Bronze medal game ===
26 May 2019; 15:45	Russia	3–2 GWS (1–2, 1–0, 0–0) (OT: 0–0) (SO: 1–0)	Czech Republic	Ondrej Nepela Arena, Bratislava; Attendance: 9,085

Game reference

Andrei Vasilevskiy
Goalies
Šimon Hrubec
Referees:
(Canada) Oliver Gouin
(Finland) Mikko Kaukokari
Linesmen:
(Sweden) Andreas Malmqvist
(United States) Brian Oliver

Grigorenko (Sergachev) – 13:00	1–0
	1–1	13:41 – Řepík (Sklenička, Rutta)
	1–2	18:34 – Kubalík (Kovář, Gulaš)
Anisimov (Gusev) – 20:39	2–2

Kovalchuk
Kucherov (miss)
Gusev
Shootout
(miss) Vrána
(miss) Kubalík
(miss) Kovář
(miss) Hronek
2 min
Penalties
4 min
31
Shots
50

=== Gold medal game ===
26 May 2019; 20:15 (UTC+2)	Canada	1–3 (1–0, 0–1, 0–2)	Finland	Ondrej Nepela Arena, Bratislava; Attendance: 9,085

Game reference

Matt Murray
Goalies
Kevin Lankinen
Referees:
(Sweden) Tobias Björk
(United States) Jeremy Tufts
Linesmen:
(Russia) Gleb Lazarev
(Czech Republic) Miroslav Lhotský

Theodore (Mantha, McCann) – 10:02	1–0
	1–1	22:35 – Anttila (Manninen, Ojamäki) (PP)
	1–2	42:35 – Anttila (Savinainen)
	1–3	55:54 – Pesonen (Tyrväinen, Hakanpää)

6 min
Penalties
8 min
44
Shots
22

== Final ranking and statistics ==
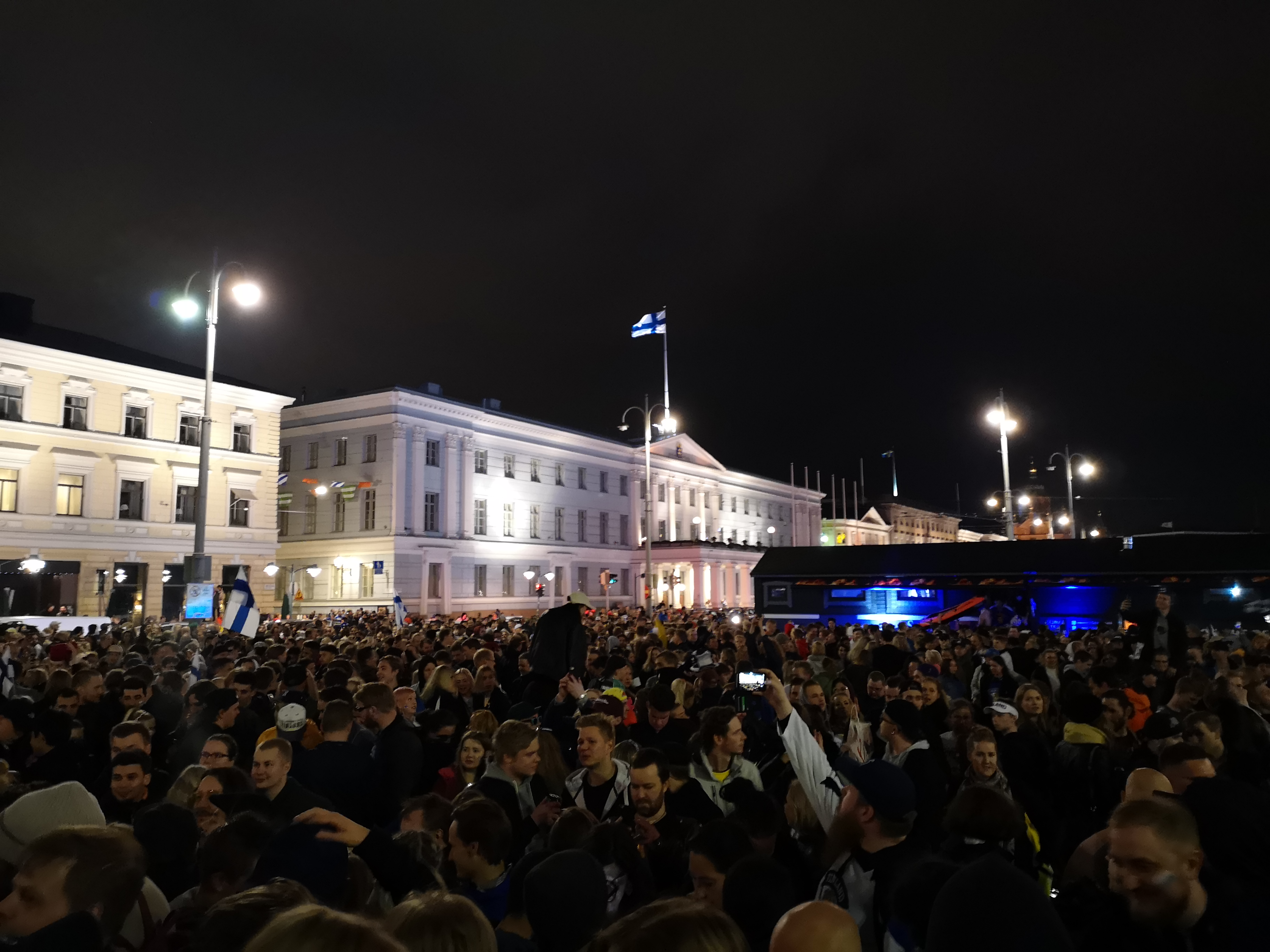
Celebrations of the 2019 IIHF World Championship victory at Helsinki Market Square, Finland

=== Final ranking ===
Pos	Grp	Team	Pld	W	OTW	OTL	L	GF	GA	GD	Pts	Final result
1	A	Finland	10	7	1	1	1	31	16	+15	24	Champions
2	A	Canada	10	7	1	0	2	45	17	+28	23	Runners-up
3	B	Russia	10	8	1	0	1	43	13	+30	26	Third place
4	B	Czech Republic	10	7	0	1	2	47	23	+24	22	Fourth place
5	B	Sweden	8	5	0	1	2	45	26	+19	16	Eliminated in Quarter-finals
6	A	Germany	8	5	0	0	3	19	23	−4	15	Eliminated in Quarter-finals
7	A	United States	8	4	1	0	3	30	19	+11	14	Eliminated in Quarter-finals
8	B	Switzerland	8	4	0	1	3	29	17	+12	13	Eliminated in Quarter-finals
9	A	Slovakia (H)	7	3	1	0	3	28	19	+9	11	Eliminated in Group stage
10	B	Latvia	7	3	0	0	4	21	20	+1	9	Eliminated in Group stage
11	A	Denmark	7	1	1	1	4	18	23	−5	6	Eliminated in Group stage
12	B	Norway	7	2	0	0	5	19	33	−14	6	Eliminated in Group stage
13	A	Great Britain	7	0	1	0	6	9	41	−32	2	Eliminated in Group stage
14	B	Italy	7	0	1	0	6	5	48	−43	2	Eliminated in Group stage
15	A	France	7	0	0	2	5	14	34	−20	2	2020 IIHF World Championship Division I
16	B	Austria	7	0	0	1	6	9	40	−31	1	2020 IIHF World Championship Division I

Source: IIHF
Rules for classification: 1) position in the group; 2) number of points; 3) goal difference; 4) goals scored; 5) seeding before tournament.
(H) Host

=== Scoring leaders ===
List shows the top skaters sorted by points, then goals.

Player	GP	G	A	Pts	+/−	PIM	POS
(Sweden) William Nylander	8	5	13	18	+16	0	F
(Russia) Nikita Kucherov	10	6	10	16	+11	4	F
(Russia) Nikita Gusev	10	4	12	16	+12	0	F
(Czech Republic) Jakub Voráček	10	4	12	16	+10	2	F
(Canada) Mark Stone	10	8	6	14	+10	0	F
(Canada) Anthony Mantha	9	7	7	14	+9	16	F
(Czech Republic) Michael Frolík	10	7	7	14	+8	2	F
(Czech Republic) Dominik Kubalík	10	6	6	12	+10	0	F
(Czech Republic) Dominik Simon	10	4	8	12	+10	2	F
(United States) Patrick Kane	8	2	10	12	0	4	F

GP = Games played; G = Goals; A = Assists; Pts = Points; +/− = Plus/minus; PIM = Penalties in minutes; POS = Position
Source: IIHF.com

=== Goaltending leaders ===
Only the top five goaltenders, based on save percentage, who have played at least 40% of their team's minutes, are included in this list.

Player	TOI	GA	GAA	SA	Sv%	SO
(Russia) Andrei Vasilevskiy	488:02	13	1.60	240	94.58	2
(Finland) Kevin Lankinen	480:41	12	1.50	207	94.20	2
(Germany) Mathias Niederberger	237:14	7	1.77	120	94.17	0
(Switzerland) Leonardo Genoni	241:30	8	1.99	129	93.80	0
(Denmark) Sebastian Dahm	307:18	10	1.95	138	92.75	1

TOI = Time on Ice (minutes:seconds); SA = Shots against; GA = Goals against; GAA = Goals against average; Sv% = Save percentage; SO = Shutouts
Source: IIHF.com

=== Awards ===
- Best players selected by the directorate:
  - Best Goaltender: (Russia) Andrei Vasilevskiy
  - Best Defenceman: (Czech Republic) Filip Hronek
  - Best Forward: (Russia) Nikita Kucherov

Source: IIHF.com

- Media All-Stars:
  - MVP: (Canada) Mark Stone
  - Goaltender: (Russia) Andrei Vasilevskiy
  - Defencemen: (Czech Republic) Filip Hronek / (Finland) Mikko Lehtonen
  - Forwards: (Canada) Mark Stone / (Sweden) William Nylander / (Czech Republic) Jakub Voráček

Source: IIHF.com

== IIHF honors and awards ==
The 2019 IIHF Hall of Fame inductees and award recipients were honored during the World Championship medal ceremonies in Bratislava.

IIHF Hall of Fame inductees

- Boris Aleksandrov, Kazakhstan
- Jörgen Jönsson, Sweden
- Mike Modano, United States
- Žigmund Pálffy, Slovakia
- Miroslav Šatan, Slovakia
- Hayley Wickenheiser, Canada

Award recipients

- Jim Johannson of the United States received the Paul Loicq Award posthumously for outstanding contributions to international ice hockey.
- Konstantin Mihailov of Bulgaria received the Torriani Award for a player with an outstanding career from non-top hockey nation.
