= Henrik Holm (ice hockey) =

Norwegian ice hockey player (born 1990)

- Born: 6 September 1990 (age 34); Fredrikstad, Norway
- Height: 6 ft 1 in (185 cm)
- Weight: 187 lb (85 kg; 13 st 5 lb)
- Position: Goaltender
- Catches: Right
- GET team Former teams: Stavanger Oilers; Stjernen Hockey
- National team: Norway
- Playing career: 2009–present

Henrik Holm (born 6 September 1990) is a Norwegian ice hockey player who is currently playing for Stavanger Oilers of the GET-ligaen.

Holm was selected to compete at the 2018 Winter Olympics as a member of the Norway men's national ice hockey team.
