= Dominik Simon =

Czech ice hockey player (born 1994)

- Simon with the HC Škoda Plzeň in 2026
- Born: 8 August 1994 (age 32) Prague, Czech Republic
- Height: 5 ft 11.25 in (181 cm)
- Weight: 176 lb (80 kg; 12 st 8 lb)
- Position: Centre
- Shoots: Left
- ELH team Former teams: HC Škoda Plzeň; Pittsburgh Penguins; Calgary Flames; Anaheim Ducks; HC Sparta Praha; Motor České Budějovice
- National team: Czech Republic
- NHL draft: 137th overall, 2015; Pittsburgh Penguins
- Playing career: 2012–present

Dominik Simon (born 8 August 1994) is a Czech professional ice hockey forward currently under contract with HC Škoda Plzeň of the Czech Extraliga (ELH). He was selected by the Pittsburgh Penguins, 137th overall, in the 2015 NHL entry draft.

== Playing career ==
=== Early career ===
Simon played in the 2007 Quebec International Pee-Wee Hockey Tournament with a youth team from Chomutov. He made his Czech Extraliga debut for HC Sparta Praha during the 2012–13 season. He was selected by Rimouski Océanic in the 2013 CHL Import Draft, however he did not report to Rimouski, instead staying with Sparta Praha for the 2013–14 season.

In May 2014, Simon signed with HC Plzeň.

After a breakout 2014–15 season with HC Plzeň in the Czech Extraliga, Simon was drafted by the Pittsburgh Penguins 137th overall in the 2015 NHL entry draft.

=== NHL ===
==== Pittsburgh Penguins ====
Simon was signed by the Penguins to a three-year, entry-level contract on 15 July 2015. He began the 2015–16 season playing for the Penguins' American Hockey League (AHL) affiliate, the Wilkes-Barre/Scranton Penguins. He made his NHL debut on 13 March 2016, where he earned his first NHL assist in a 5–3 win against the New York Rangers. After playing three games in the NHL, he was reassigned to the AHL.

On 6 April 2017, Simon was recalled from Wilkes-Barre/Scranton.

Simon was recalled again from the Wilkes-Barre/Scranton Penguins on 8 December 2017, as Greg McKegg was reassigned. Simon scored his first NHL goal on 14 January 2018 in a game against the New York Rangers. Simon was injured in a game against the Philadelphia Flyers on 7 March 2018. He returned to the lineup on 23 March 2018 for a game against the New Jersey Devils. Simon made his playoff debut on 18 April 2018, where he also recorded his first playoff point in a 5–0 win over Philadelphia.

In October 2018, Simon made the Pittsburgh opening-night roster for the 2018–19 NHL season. Simon was injured on 4 December 2018, suffering a lower-body injury during a game against the Colorado Avalanche. He returned to the line-up on 20 December after missing eight games.

Following his fifth season within the Penguins organization in 2019–20, due to salary cap considerations, Simon was not tendered a qualifying offer as a restricted free agent and was released to free agency on 5 October 2020. On 22 October 2020, Simon agreed to join the Calgary Flames by signing a one-year, $700,000 contract. In the pandemic delayed 2020–21 season, Simon struggled to find a role within the Flames, going scoreless in 11 games before he was reassigned to AHL affiliate, the Stockton Heat.

At the conclusion of his contract with the Flames, on 28 July 2021 Simon returned to the Pittsburgh Penguins as a free agent on a one-year, two-way deal.

==== Anaheim Ducks ====
On 21 March 2022, Simon was traded by Pittsburgh along with Zach Aston-Reese to the Anaheim Ducks in exchange for Rickard Rakell.

==== Return to Sparta Praha ====
At the conclusion of his contract with the Ducks, Simon a free agent opted to return to Czechia and signed a two-year contract with his original club, HC Sparta Praha of the ELH, on 10 September 2022.

== International play ==
Medal record

Representing Czech Republic

World Championships
Bronze medal – third place	2022 Finland	

Simon made his Czech Republic national team senior debut when he participated at the 2015 IIHF World Championship. He also represented the Czech Republic at the 2019 IIHF World Championship and the 2022 IIHF World Championship, where he won a bronze medal.

== Career statistics ==
=== Regular season and playoffs ===
			Regular season					Playoffs
Season	Team	League	GP	G	A	Pts	PIM	GP	G	A	Pts	PIM
2010–11	HC Sparta Praha	CZE U18	38	24	16	40	10	5	2	1	3	4
2011–12	HC Sparta Praha	CZE U18	14	17	13	30	12	7	5	3	8	4
2011–12	HC Sparta Praha	CZE U20	34	11	10	21	2	—	—	—	—	—
2012–13	HC Sparta Praha	CZE U20	11	9	8	17	2	7	7	0	7	2
2012–13	HC Sparta Praha	ELH	18	1	1	2	0	—	—	—	—	—
2012–13	HC Stadion Litoměřice	Czech.1	25	9	10	19	24	—	—	—	—	—
2013–14	HC Sparta Praha	ELH	46	4	7	11	4	10	1	1	2	6
2013–14	HC Stadion Litoměřice	Czech.1	3	0	1	1	12	—	—	—	—	—
2014–15	HC Škoda Plzeň	ELH	52	18	12	30	20	4	1	2	3	4
2015–16	Wilkes–Barre/Scranton Penguins	AHL	68	25	23	48	36	7	1	1	2	2
2015–16	Pittsburgh Penguins	NHL	3	0	1	1	0	—	—	—	—	—
2016–17	Wilkes–Barre/Scranton Penguins	AHL	70	15	31	46	18	5	0	3	3	0
2016–17	Pittsburgh Penguins	NHL	2	0	1	1	0	—	—	—	—	—
2017–18	Wilkes–Barre/Scranton Penguins	AHL	21	4	13	17	14	—	—	—	—	—
2017–18	Pittsburgh Penguins	NHL	33	4	8	12	16	8	0	3	3	4
2018–19	Pittsburgh Penguins	NHL	71	8	20	28	18	4	0	1	1	0
2019–20	Pittsburgh Penguins	NHL	64	7	15	22	12	—	—	—	—	—
2020–21	Calgary Flames	NHL	11	0	0	0	0	—	—	—	—	—
2020–21	Stockton Heat	AHL	1	0	0	0	0	—	—	—	—	—
2021–22	Pittsburgh Penguins	NHL	55	3	6	9	28	—	—	—	—	—
2021–22	Anaheim Ducks	NHL	17	0	4	4	6	—	—	—	—	—
2022-23	HC Sparta Praha	Czechia	22	2	1	3	4	—	—	—	—	—
2023-24	Motor České Budějovice	Czechia	39	5	12	17	14	8	0	1	1	2
2024-25	HC Škoda Plzeň	Czechia	48	6	15	21	26	4	0	1	1	0
2025-26	HC Škoda Plzeň	Czechia	52	7	11	18	20	7	0	0	0	4
AHL totals			160	44	67	111	68	12	1	4	5	2
NHL totals			256	22	55	77	80	12	0	4	4	4

=== International ===
Year	Team	Event	Result	GP	G	A	Pts	PIM
2011	Czech Republic	IH18	6th	4	0	0	0	2
2012	Czech Republic	WJC18	8th	6	4	4	8	4
2014	Czech Republic	WJC	6th	5	2	2	4	2
2015	Czech Republic	WC	4th	10	1	5	6	2
2019	Czech Republic	WC	4th	10	4	8	12	2
2022	Czech Republic	WC	3rd place, bronze medalist(s)	2	0	0	0	0
Junior totals				15	6	6	12	8
Senior totals				22	5	13	18	4
