= Jakub Voráček =

Czech ice hockey player (born 1989)

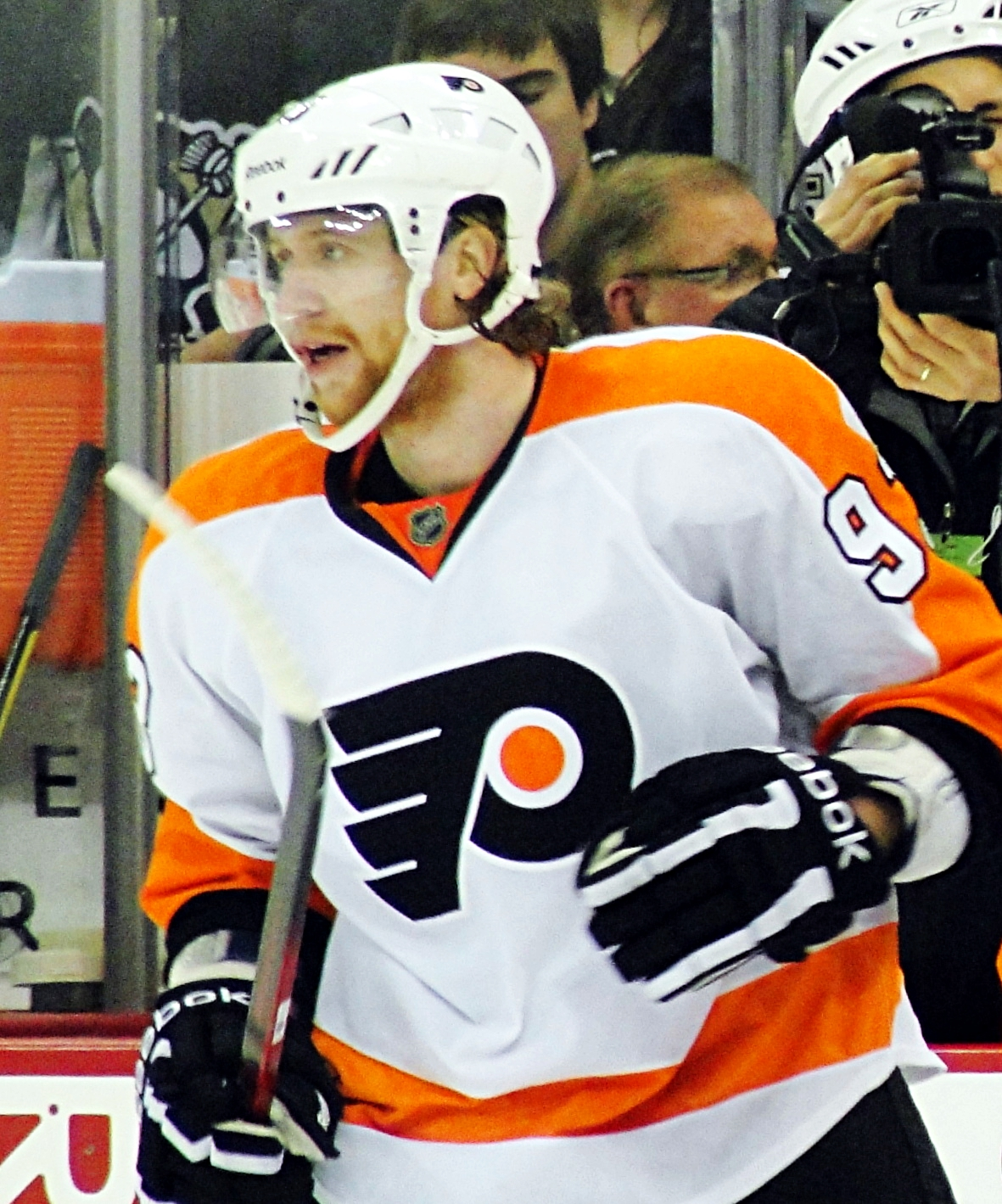
- Voráček with the Philadelphia Flyers in December 2011
- Born: 15 August 1989 (age 37) Kladno, Czechoslovakia
- Height: 6 ft 2 in (188 cm)
- Weight: 214 lb (97 kg; 15 st 4 lb)
- Position: Right wing
- Shot: Left
- Played for: HC Rabat Kladno; Columbus Blue Jackets; Philadelphia Flyers; HC Lev Praha
- National team: Czech Republic
- NHL draft: 7th overall, 2007; Columbus Blue Jackets
- Playing career: 2005–2022

Jakub Voráček (Czech pronunciation: [ˈjakub ˈvoraːt͡ʃɛk]; born 15 August 1989) is a Czech former professional ice hockey right winger who played 15 seasons in the National Hockey League (NHL). He was drafted seventh overall by the Columbus Blue Jackets at the 2007 NHL entry draft. In 2011, Voráček was traded to the Philadelphia Flyers in exchange for Jeff Carter. He played for the Flyers until 2021 when he was traded back to Columbus in exchange for Cam Atkinson. He has also played in his native Czech Republic for HC Rabat Kladno and HC Lev Praha.

== Playing career ==
=== Junior ===
Voráček was taken first overall in the 2006 Canadian Hockey League (CHL) Import Draft and played two seasons with the Halifax Mooseheads of the Quebec Major Junior Hockey League (QMJHL). He also represented the Czech Republic at the World Junior Ice Hockey Championship in 2007 and 2008. On 2 August 2007, he signed a three-year, entry-level contract with the Columbus Blue Jackets, the NHL organization that drafted him seventh overall in the 2007 NHL entry draft.

=== Professional ===
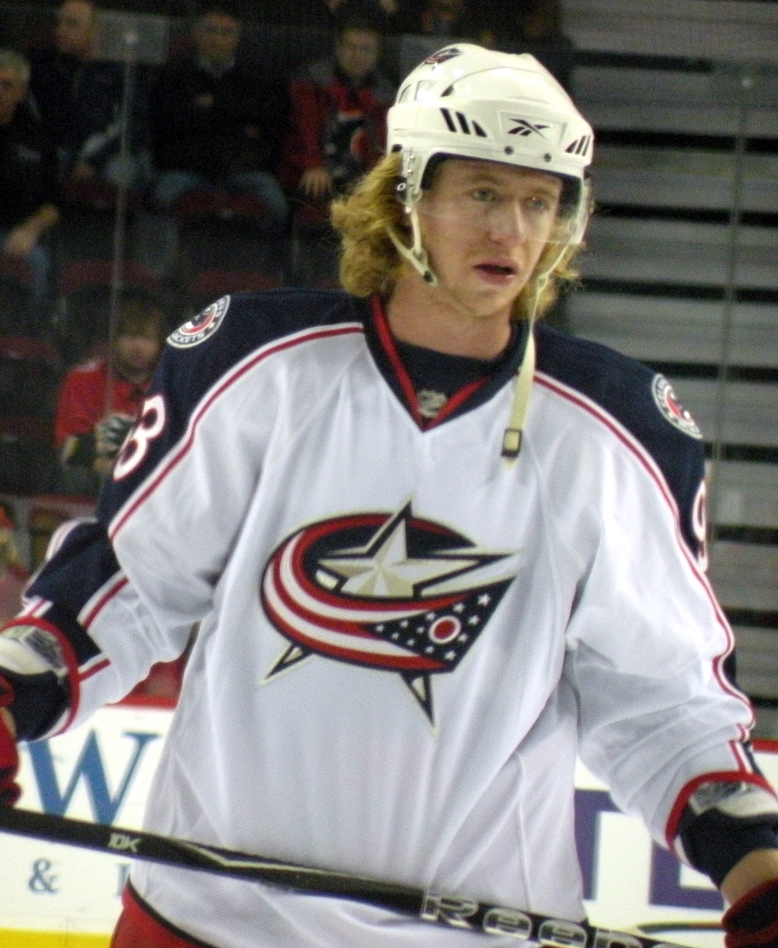
Voráček with the Blue Jackets in October 2009

==== Columbus Blue Jackets ====
Voráček made his NHL debut on 10 October 2008 against the Dallas Stars, also scoring his first career NHL goal in the game's first period on goaltender Marty Turco. Voráček scored 9 goals and 29 assists for 38 points in 80 games during his rookie season, helping the Blue Jackets make the Stanley Cup playoffs for the first time in franchise history in 2009. He also had the lone assist on the first-ever playoff goal in Blue Jackets history, scored by R. J. Umberger.

==== Philadelphia Flyers ====
On 23 June 2011, Voráček was traded (along with first- and third-round picks in the 2011 NHL entry draft) to the Philadelphia Flyers in exchange for Jeff Carter. Days later, on 1 July, Voráček signed a one-year contract with the Flyers, the same day his new team signed fellow Kladno native and long-time NHL star Jaromír Jágr to a one-year contract. In his Flyers debut against the Boston Bruins, Voráček scored a goal in the game's first period against goaltender Tim Thomas. In the 2011–12 season, Voráček set a new career-high with 18 goals scored, also later scoring his first career Stanley Cup playoff goal in Game 1 of the Flyers' opening round Eastern Conference Quarterfinal series against the Pittsburgh Penguins, beating Marc-André Fleury 2:23 into the first overtime period.

In the subsequent off-season, on 26 July 2012, Voráček signed a four-year, $17 million contract with the Flyers paying $4.25 million annually. Upon signing, Voráček was expected to fill the gap left by Jágr, who had departed weeks prior via free agency to Dallas, on the Flyers' top line, alongside Claude Giroux and Scott Hartnell.

Voráček returned to the Czech Republic to play for HC Lev Praha of the Kontinental Hockey League (KHL) during the 2012–13 NHL lockout. On 20 February 2013, shortly after play resumed in the NHL for the 2012–13 season, in a game against Pittsburgh, he scored his first career NHL hat-trick. On 25 February, he was then named the NHL's First Star of the Week after scoring four goals and seven assists in four games.

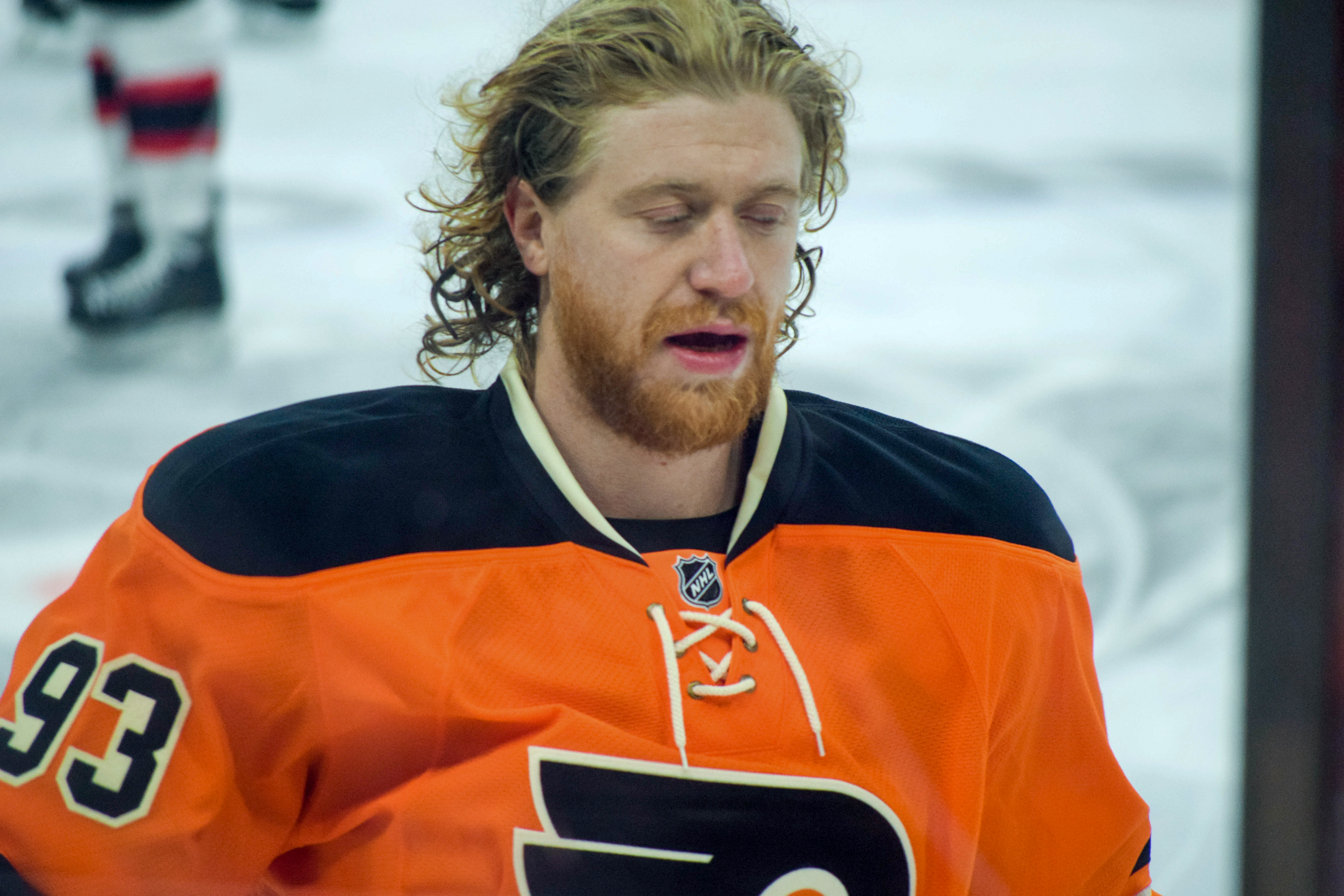
Voráček with the Philadelphia Flyers in February 2016

During the 2014–15 season, Voráček scored the second-fastest overtime goal in Flyers history on 22 December 2014 in a game against the Winnipeg Jets. The goal, unassisted, was scored just ten seconds into overtime against Jets goaltender Ondřej Pavelec at the MTS Center in Winnipeg. It was scored just three seconds slower than former Flyer Simon Gagné's overtime-winning goal seven seconds into the 5 January 2006 game against the New York Rangers. Later in the season, Voráček was named to the 2015 NHL All-Star Game in Columbus, Ohio. In the game, he tied the single NHL All-Star Game record for most points scored with six, tying Mario Lemieux's record previously set in the 1988 edition. Playing in all 82 regular season Philadelphia games, Voráček finished the year with 22 goals and 59 assists for a career-high 81 points, tying him for fourth in the NHL lead alongside the Washington Capitals' Alexander Ovechkin.

In July 2015, Voráček signed a new eight-year, $66 million contract with the Flyers. During the 2015–16 season, Voráček experienced a slump in number production while also recording his 400th NHL point and playing in his 600th career NHL game. During the season, Voráček only recorded 11 goals, the lowest in his NHL career since his rookie year. He played in his 600th NHL game against the Florida Panthers on 4 April 2016. Voráček concluded the regular season with 55 points overall. The Flyers qualified for the 2016 playoffs where they lost to the Washington Capitals in six games. Voráček recorded one goal over the six games.

At the beginning of the 2017–18 season, Voráček was on the Flyers' top line alongside Claude Giroux and Sean Couturier. Despite occasionally being moved to a different line, he ended the regular season with a career-high 85 points in 82 games. During his career year, Voráček became only the second Flyers player in franchise history (the first being Joni Pitkänen) to score the tying goal in a game with less than two minutes left and score in overtime. Voráček was also one of five Flyers players to end the regular season with 20 or more goals to help push the Flyers to the 2018 playoffs.

==== Return to Columbus ====
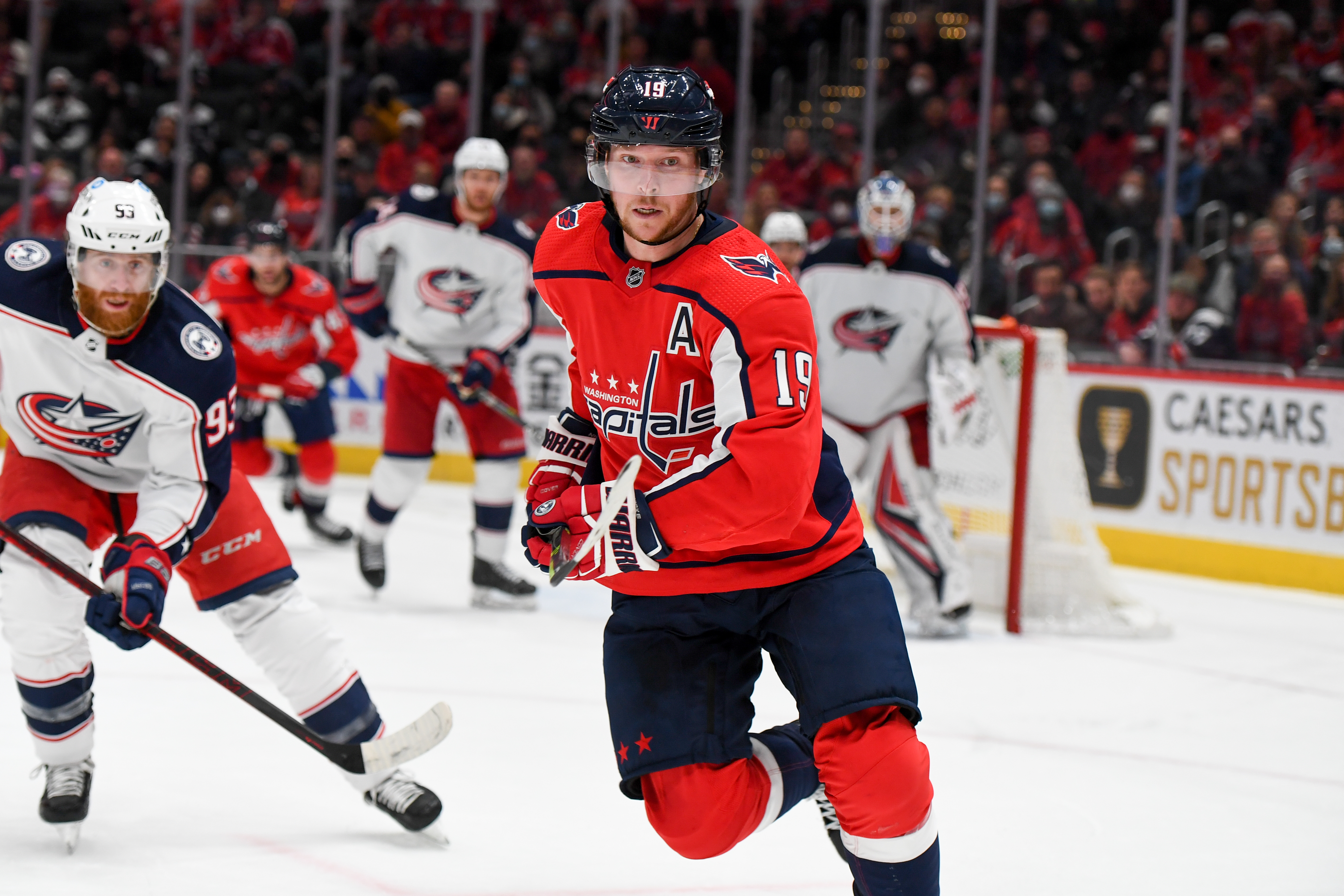
Voráček (left) battling for puck possession against Nicklas Bäckström in February 2022

On 24 July 2021, Voráček was traded by the Flyers back to the Columbus Blue Jackets in exchange for Cam Atkinson.

On 6 January 2022, Voráček played his 1,000th NHL game in a 3–1 loss to the New Jersey Devils.

On 6 November 2022, while playing in the 2022 NHL Global Series in Tampere, Finland, he sustained a concussion after being hit in the face with a high stick by Dryden Hunt of the Colorado Avalanche, and missed the remainder of the 2022–23 season.

==== Retirement ====
On 2 March 2023, the Blue Jackets traded Voráček and a sixth-round pick in the 2023 NHL entry draft to the Arizona Coyotes in exchange for Jon Gillies. The trade helped Arizona reach the salary floor, although Arizona discussed the possibility of his salary being covered by insurance.

After the trade, it was widely assumed that he had played his last NHL game and would likely retire when his contract expired after the 2023–24 season. After spending the entire 2023–24 season on the Coyotes' long-term injured reserve list, Voráček formally announced his retirement on 23 April 2024.

== Coaching career ==
In September 2023, while still on injured reserve with the Arizona Coyotes, Voráček took a position as an assistant coach with the Czech Extraliga (ELH) team Rytíři Kladno. As a coach, his focus is on the power play and on development of young players. The team's owner and president is his former Philadelphia Flyers teammate and two-time Stanley Cup winner Jaromír Jágr.

== Personal life ==
As a child, Voráček wanted to be a garbage man. In 2017, his sister gave him a Christmas gift of the opportunity to ride a trash truck while the garbage men worked their route. Voráček has two children – a son with former girlfriend, and a son with current girlfriend. He is a big fan of Bruce Springsteen.

== Career statistics ==
=== Regular season and playoffs ===
			Regular season					Playoffs
Season	Team	League	GP	G	A	Pts	PIM	GP	G	A	Pts	PIM
2003–04	HC Rabat Kladno	CZE U18	52	30	24	54	28	2	0	0	0	2
2004–05	HC Rabat Kladno	CZE U18	30	23	39	62	44	7	5	4	9	14
2004–05	HC Rabat Kladno	CZE U20	16	5	7	12	6	1	1	0	1	2
2005–06	HC Rabat Kladno	CZE U20	46	21	38	59	54	6	7	4	11	2
2005–06	HC Rabat Kladno	ELH	1	0	0	0	0	—	—	—	—	—
2005–06	HC Rabat Kladno	CZE U18	—	—	—	—	—	2	1	3	4	31
2006–07	Halifax Mooseheads	QMJHL	59	23	63	86	26	12	7	17	24	6
2007–08	Halifax Mooseheads	QMJHL	53	33	68	101	42	15	5	13	18	14
2008–09	Columbus Blue Jackets	NHL	80	9	29	38	44	4	0	1	1	8
2009–10	Columbus Blue Jackets	NHL	81	16	34	50	26	—	—	—	—	—
2010–11	Columbus Blue Jackets	NHL	80	14	32	46	26	—	—	—	—	—
2011–12	Philadelphia Flyers	NHL	78	18	31	49	32	11	2	8	10	8
2012–13	HC Lev Praha	KHL	23	7	13	20	22	—	—	—	—	—
2012–13	Philadelphia Flyers	NHL	48	22	24	46	35	—	—	—	—	—
2013–14	Philadelphia Flyers	NHL	82	23	39	62	22	7	2	2	4	4
2014–15	Philadelphia Flyers	NHL	82	22	59	81	78	—	—	—	—	—
2015–16	Philadelphia Flyers	NHL	73	11	44	55	38	6	1	0	1	4
2016–17	Philadelphia Flyers	NHL	82	20	41	61	56	—	—	—	—	—
2017–18	Philadelphia Flyers	NHL	82	20	65	85	50	6	0	3	3	6
2018–19	Philadelphia Flyers	NHL	78	20	46	66	25	—	—	—	—	—
2019–20	Philadelphia Flyers	NHL	69	12	44	56	31	15	4	5	9	24
2020–21	Philadelphia Flyers	NHL	53	9	34	43	18	—	—	—	—	—
2021–22	Columbus Blue Jackets	NHL	79	6	56	62	44	—	—	—	—	—
2022–23	Columbus Blue Jackets	NHL	11	1	5	6	0	—	—	—	—	—
NHL totals			1,058	223	583	806	525	49	9	19	28	54

Medal record

Ice hockey

Representing Czech Republic

World Championships
Gold medal – first place	2010 Cologne	
Bronze medal – third place	2011 Bratislava	

IIHF U18 Championships
Bronze medal – third place	2006 Halmstad	

=== International ===
Year	Team	Event	Result	GP	G	A	Pts	PIM
2005	Czech Republic	U18	2nd place, silver medalist(s)	5	1
2006	Czech Republic	WJC18	3rd place, bronze medalist(s)	7	3	3	6	6
2006	Czech Republic	U18	5th	4	4
2007	Czech Republic	WJC	5th	6	1	2	3	4
2007	Czech Republic	WJC18	9th	4	1	2	3	2
2008	Czech Republic	WJC	5th	6	0	6	6	4
2010	Czech Republic	WC	1st place, gold medalist(s)	9	0	2	2	6
2011	Czech Republic	WC	3rd place, bronze medalist(s)	9	1	2	3	2
2013	Czech Republic	WC	7th	8	1	6	7	2
2014	Czech Republic	OG	6th	5	1	1	2	2
2016	Czech Republic	WCH	6th	3	1	1	2	4
2017	Czech Republic	WC	7th	8	1	5	6	6
2019	Czech Republic	WC	4th	10	4	12	16	2
Junior totals				23	5	13	18	16
Senior totals				62	12	36	48	30

== Awards and honours ==
Award	Year
QMJHL
All-Rookie Team	2007
RDS Cup	2007
Michel Bergeron Trophy	2007
Second All-Star team	2008
NHL
NHL All-Star Game	2015
NHL first All-Star team	2015
Philadelphia Flyers
Bobby Clarke Trophy	2013, 2015
Gene Hart Memorial Award	2015
Pelle Lindbergh Memorial Trophy	2013
Yanick Dupre Memorial Class Guy Award	2014
Czech Republic
Golden Hockey Stick	2015

Awards and achievements
Preceded by Derick Brassard	Columbus Blue Jackets first-round draft pick 2007	Succeeded by Nikita Filatov
Preceded by Claude Giroux; Claude Giroux	Winner of the Bobby Clarke Trophy; 2013; 2015	Succeeded by Claude Giroux; Claude Giroux
