= Jan Kolář (ice hockey, born 1986) =

Czech ice hockey player

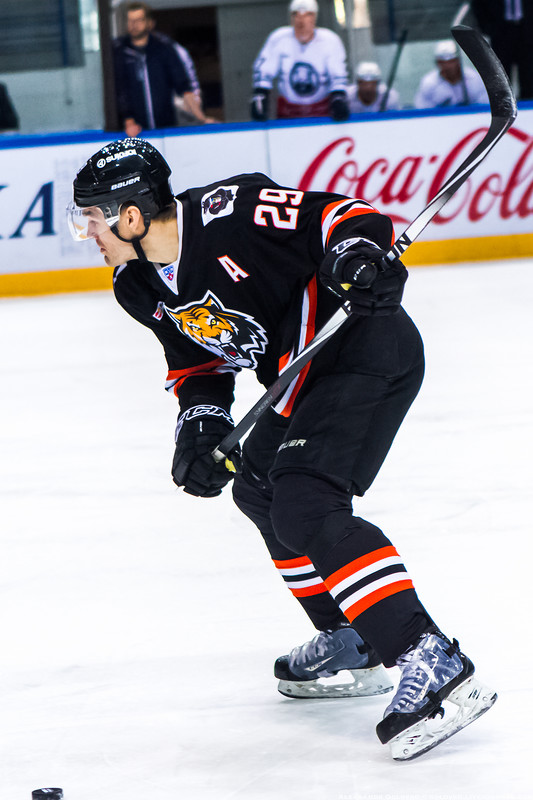
- Born: 22 November 1986 (age 39) Pardubice, Czechoslovakia
- Height: 6 ft 3 in (191 cm)
- Weight: 209 lb (95 kg; 14 st 13 lb)
- Position: Defence
- Shoots: Left
- ELH team Former teams: HC Dynamo Pardubice; HC Donbass; Admiral Vladivostok; Amur Khabarovsk
- National team: Czech Republic
- Playing career: 2004–present

Jan Kolář (born 22 November 1986) is a Czech professional ice hockey defenceman for HC Dynamo Pardubice in the Czech Extraliga (ELH) and the Czech national team.

== Career ==
Kolář previously played in the Kontinental Hockey League for HC Donbass, Admiral Vladivostok and Amur Khabarovsk. He participated at the IIHF World Championship for the Czech Republic in 2014, 2015 2016 and 2019. He also played in the 2018 Winter Olympics.

== Career statistics ==
=== Regular season and playoffs ===
			Regular season					Playoffs
Season	Team	League	GP	G	A	Pts	PIM	GP	G	A	Pts	PIM
2000–01	HC IPB Pojišťovna Pardubice	CZE U18	6	0	0	0	0	1	0	0	0	0
2001–02	HC IPB Pojišťovna Pardubice	CZE U18	48	2	3	5	12	6	0	0	0	0
2002–03	HC ČSOB Pojišťovna Pardubice	CZE U18	25	3	7	10	16	—	—	—	—	—
2002–03	HC ČSOB Pojišťovna Pardubice	CZE U20	23	1	1	2	20	—	—	—	—	—
2003–04	HC Oceláři Třinec	CZE U20	56	3	5	8	73	—	—	—	—	—
2004–05	HC Moeller Pardubice	CZE U20	47	6	10	16	24	2	0	0	0	4
2004–05	HC Moeller Pardubice	ELH	—	—	—	—	—	1	0	0	0	0
2005–06	HC Moeller Pardubice	CZE U20	3	0	0	0	10	—	—	—	—	—
2005–06	KLH Vajgar Jindřichův Hradec	CZE.2	33	1	2	3	18	—	—	—	—	—
2005–06	HC VČE Hradec Králové, a.s.	CZE.2	7	0	1	1	4	—	—	—	—	—
2006–07	HC Moeller Pardubice	ELH	1	0	0	0	0	—	—	—	—	—
2006–07	HC Rebel Havlíčkův Brod	CZE.2	51	3	9	12	44	—	—	—	—	—
2007–08	HC Moeller Pardubice	ELH	43	0	1	1	22	—	—	—	—	—
2007–08	HC VCES Hradec Králové, a.s.	CZE.2	12	1	1	2	4	9	0	2	2	8
2008–09	HC Moeller Pardubice	ELH	26	0	2	2	10	7	0	1	1	2
2008–09	HC Chrudim	CZE.2	35	7	6	13	40	—	—	—	—	—
2009–10	HC Eaton Pardubice	ELH	48	5	5	10	28	13	0	4	4	2
2010–11	HC Eaton Pardubice	ELH	47	2	1	3	22	4	0	0	0	4
2010–11	HC Chrudim	CZE.2	3	1	4	5	4	—	—	—	—	—
2011–12	HC ČSOB Pojišťovna Pardubice	ELH	52	5	14	19	57	19	0	7	7	8
2012–13	HC ČSOB Pojišťovna Pardubice	ELH	21	2	9	11	16	—	—	—	—	—
2012–13	Donbass Donetsk	KHL	25	1	2	3	10	—	—	—	—	—
2013–14	Donbass Donetsk	KHL	53	3	10	13	22	13	0	1	1	6
2014–15	Admiral Vladivostok	KHL	56	8	15	23	59	—	—	—	—	—
2015–16	Amur Khabarovsk	KHL	60	1	11	12	55	—	—	—	—	—
2016–17	Amur Khabarovsk	KHL	60	9	6	15	25	—	—	—	—	—
2017–18	Amur Khabarovsk	KHL	51	7	10	17	57	5	0	3	3	13
2018–19	Amur Khabarovsk	KHL	41	4	9	13	12	—	—	—	—	—
2019–20	HC Dynamo Pardubice	ELH	51	5	17	22	22	—	—	—	—	—
2020–21	HC Dynamo Pardubice	ELH	51	1	7	8	16	8	0	3	3	6
2021–22	HC Dynamo Pardubice	ELH	41	3	4	7	14	8	0	4	4	2
ELH totals			381	23	60	83	207	63	0	20	20	28
CZE.2 totals			141	13	23	36	114	9	0	2	2	8
KHL totals			346	33	63	96	240	18	0	4	4	24

=== International ===
Year	Team	Event	GP	G	A	Pts	PIM
2014	Czech Republic	WC	10	1	2	3	2
2015	Czech Republic	WC	10	0	3	3	2
2016	Czech Republic	WC	8	0	1	1	4
2018	Czech Republic	OG	6	1	2	3	4
2019	Czech Republic	WC	10	1	5	6	4
Senior totals			44	3	13	16	16
