= Alexander Wennberg =

Swedish ice hockey player (born 1994)

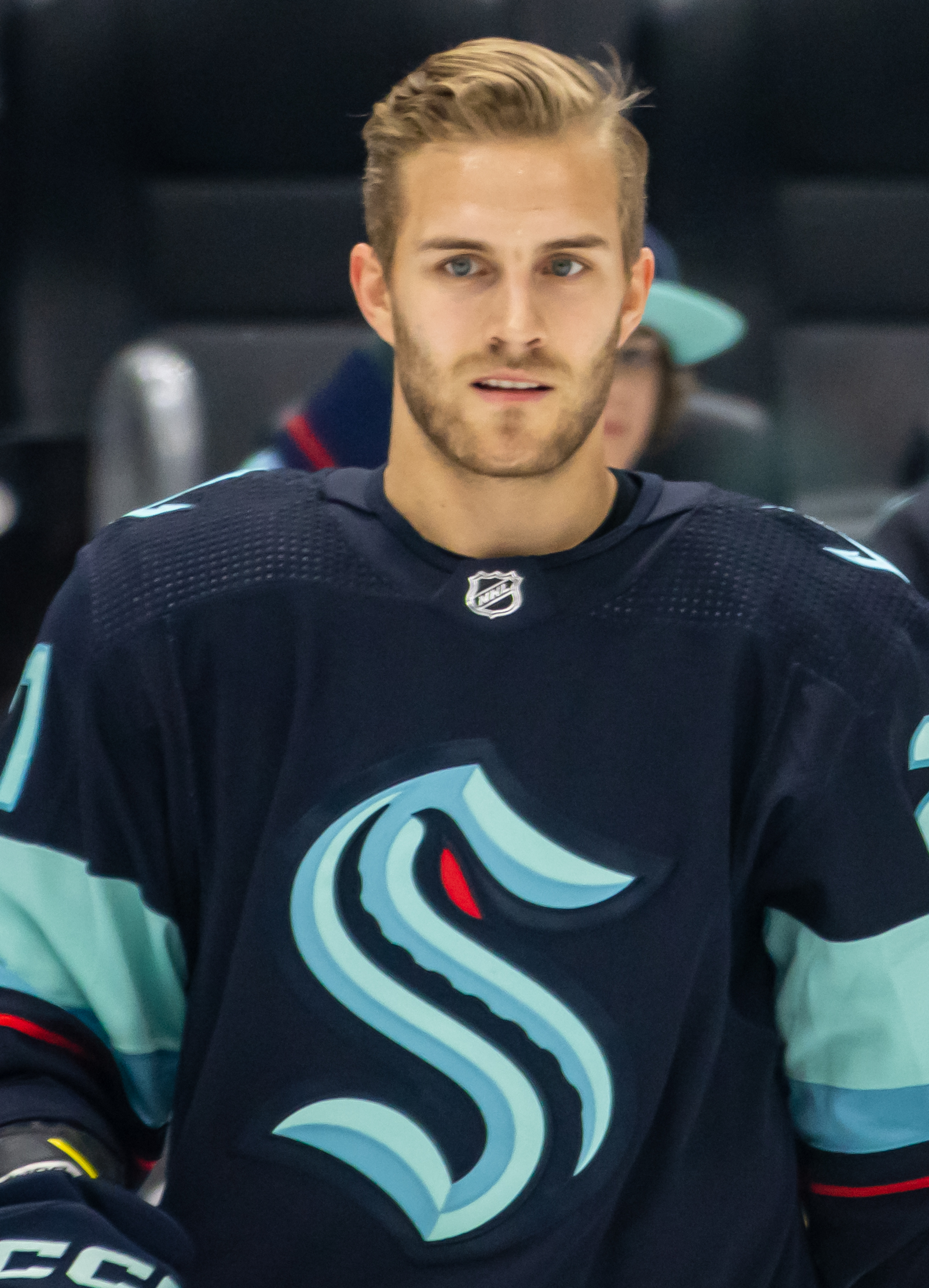
- Wennberg with the Seattle Kraken in 2023
- Born: 22 September 1994 (age 32) Nacka, Sweden
- Height: 6 ft 2 in (188 cm)
- Weight: 190 lb (86 kg; 13 st 8 lb)
- Position: Centre
- Shoots: Left
- NHL team Former teams: San Jose Sharks; Djurgårdens IF; Frölunda HC; Columbus Blue Jackets; Florida Panthers; Seattle Kraken; New York Rangers
- National team: Sweden
- NHL draft: 14th overall, 2013; Columbus Blue Jackets
- Playing career: 2011–present

Alexander Wennberg (born 22 September 1994) is a Swedish professional ice hockey player who is a centre and alternate captain for the San Jose Sharks of the National Hockey League (NHL). He previously played for the Columbus Blue Jackets, Florida Panthers, Seattle Kraken, and New York Rangers. He was drafted by the Blue Jackets in the first round, 14th overall, of the 2013 NHL entry draft. Before joining the NHL, Wennberg played professionally in the Swedish Hockey League (SHL).

== Playing career ==
=== Amateur ===
For the 2010–11 season, Wennberg joined the Djurgårdens IF under-18 team, scoring 11 goals and 23 assists. The next year, he moved up to the organization's under-20 team and also represented Sweden at the 2011 U19 World Junior A Challenge and 2012 U18 World Junior Championship tournaments. He also spent time with Djurgårdens IF's Elitserien senior team but did not appear in any games.

Wennberg was ranked fifth out of all 2013 NHL entry draft eligible European skaters and was ultimately selected 14th overall by the Columbus Blue Jackets at the 2013 NHL entry draft. In May 2014, he signed a three-year, entry-level contract with the Blue Jackets. Upon joining the Blue Jackets, Wennberg was given the jersey number 41 which he switched in his second season.

=== Professional ===
==== Columbus Blue Jackets ====
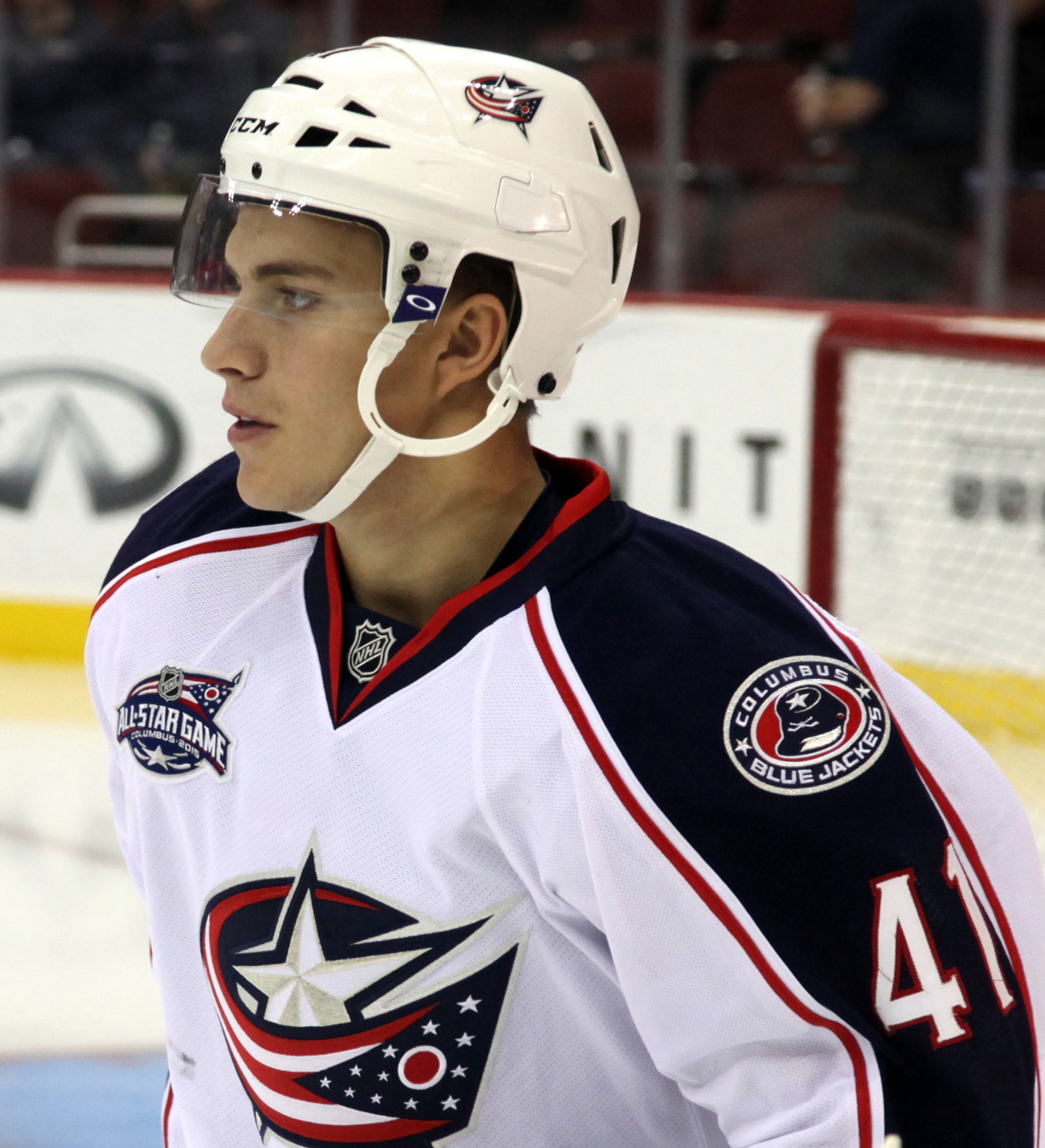
Wennberg with the Columbus Blue Jackets in 2014.

Wennberg made his NHL debut on 9 October 2014, against the Buffalo Sabres, where he also recorded his first NHL point. He was reassigned to Columbus' American Hockey League (AHL) affiliate, the Springfield Falcons, after playing in seven NHL games, as defenceman Ryan Murray was activated off injured reserve. However, he was recalled to Columbus the next day after the team placed Matt Calvert on injured reserve. Wennberg scored his first career NHL goal on 22 December in a 5–1 loss to the Nashville Predators.

Wennberg missed the first five games of the 2015–16 season to recover from a concussion he suffered during the Blue Jackets' season opener against the New York Rangers. After returning, Wennberg was again injured in early November and was subsequently placed on injured reserve.

The following season, Wennberg played in 80 regular season games and recorded career-highs in goals (13) and assists (46). On 1 September 2017, he signed a new six-year, $29.4 million contract with the Blue Jackets carrying an annual salary cap hit of $4.9 million.

During the first game of the 2018 Stanley Cup playoffs, Wennberg was injured by a check from Washington Capitals forward Tom Wilson and was removed from the game. Due to this, the Blue Jackets earned a power play which Columbus scored on to tie the game. The Blue Jackets went on to win the game in overtime. Wennberg played two more games in the series but the Blue Jackets failed to advance.

==== Florida Panthers ====
On 8 October 2020, Wennberg was placed on waivers for the purpose of buying out the remaining three years on his contract. On the opening day of free agency, Wennberg was signed by the Florida Panthers to a one-year, $2.25 million contract on 9 October. He was signed by newly-installed general manager Bill Zito, who was formerly a part of the Blue Jackets organization. In a fresh start with the Panthers, in which the pandemic delayed and shortened the 2020–21 season, Wennberg responded with a career high 17 goals in 56 games, and added 12 assists while relied upon to provide responsible two-way play.

==== Seattle Kraken ====
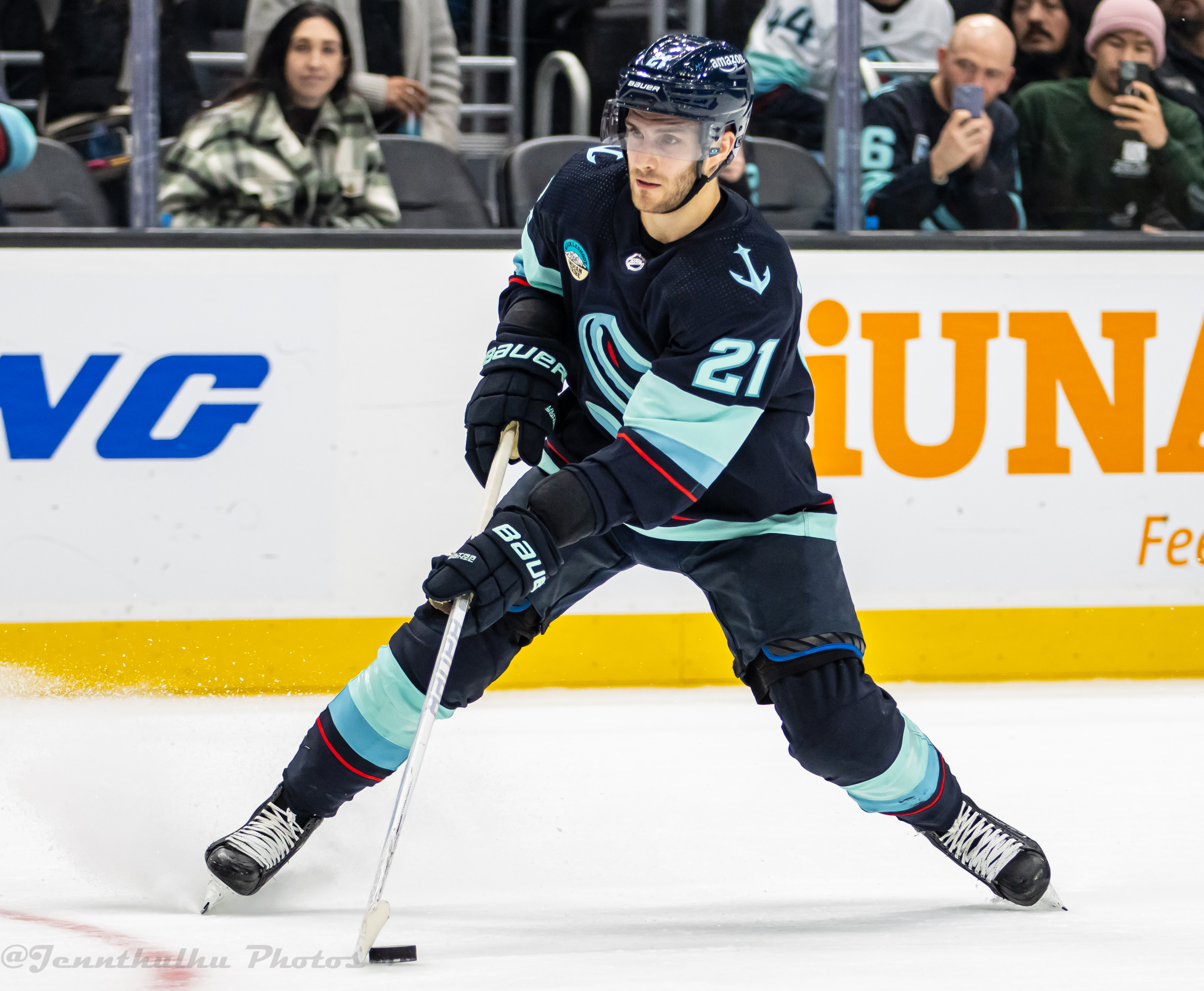
Wennberg with the Kraken in 2023.

As a free agent from the Panthers, Wennberg was targeted and signed to a three-year, $13.5 million contract with the expansion club, the Seattle Kraken, on 28 July 2021. During training camp, Wennberg was placed on a line with fellow Swedes Calle Järnkrok and Marcus Johansson. Due to their shared lineage, the trio's line was quickly named the Swedish House Mafia. After missing the start of the preseason due to the birth of his first child, Wennberg made his Kraken preseason debut with the Swedish line on 1 October against the Edmonton Oilers. However, the line was broken up in the final preseason game after Järnkrok entered the NHL's COVID-19 protocols.

==== New York Rangers ====
On 6 March 2024, two days before the trade deadline, the Kraken traded Wennberg to the New York Rangers in exchange for a 2024 second-round and a conditional 2025 fourth-round draft pick. He made his debut with the Rangers on 9 March, recording one assist.

==== San Jose Sharks ====
In the 2024 off-season, Wennberg left the Rangers as a free agent and signed a two-year, $10 million contract with the San Jose Sharks.

On 8 October 2025, Wennberg was named an alternate captain for road games for the 2025–26 season. In January 2026, he signed a three-year, $18 million contract extension. On 27 March, he was named the Sharks' nominee for the King Clancy Memorial Trophy, awarded for leadership on and off the ice and humanitarian contributions to the community.

Wennberg finished the 2025–26 season with 55 points (18 goals, 37 assists) in 80 games, his most offensively productive season since 2016–17 with the Columbus Blue Jackets. He set career highs in goals, power play goals, and average ice time (20:27).

On 30 September 2026, Wennberg was once again named an alternate captain for the 2026–27 season, this time for home games.

== International play ==
Wennberg made his debut with the Sweden senior team at the 2016 World Championship, recording eight points (one goal, seven assists) in eight games. He returned to the team in the 2019 World Championship, recording ten points (three goals, seven assists) in six games. At the 2025 World Championship, he recorded four points (one goal, three assists) in ten games, and Sweden won the bronze medal.

Wennberg was named to Sweden's for the 2026 Winter Olympics. Sweden lost to the United States in the quarterfinals.

== Personal life ==
Wennberg and his wife were married in summer 2022. They grew up near each other in Sweden but did not meet until after he reached the NHL and she had completed her studies in the United Kingdom. The couple has three children – one son and two daughters. Wennberg and his wife support causes for LGBTQIA+ youth and the Special Olympics. In October 2025, during the federal government shutdown as SNAP benefits were expected to lose funding, Wennberg and his wife donated 50,000 meals to Feeding America and Second Harvest Food Bank of Silicon Valley.

In July 2023, Wennberg became popular among TikTok's BookTok subcommunity "for his chiseled Nordic good looks." The Kraken began producing and releasing their own TikTok videos which were marketed to BookTok users and intended to capitalize on his good looks. Wennberg's wife described the attention and the comments by fans as objectifying and having "crossed the line of what it means to fancy someone" into the realm of being "predatory and exploiting." When her comments received backlash, Wennberg took to social media to echo the sentiment, writing "aggressive language about real life players is too much" and asking for "a little respect." The Kraken deleted all references to BookTok from their social media accounts shortly thereafter.

== Career statistics ==
=== Regular season and playoffs ===
			Regular season					Playoffs
Season	Team	League	GP	G	A	Pts	PIM	GP	G	A	Pts	PIM
2010–11	Djurgårdens IF	J18	22	8	12	20	2	—	—	—	—	—
2010–11	Djurgårdens IF	J18 Allsv	18	3	11	14	4	5	1	2	3	2
2011–12	Djurgårdens IF	J18	4	3	1	4	0	—	—	—	—	—
2011–12	Djurgårdens IF	J18 Allsv	6	1	1	2	4	2	0	1	1	0
2011–12	Djurgårdens IF	J20	42	1	18	19	6	3	0	1	1	0
2011–12	Djurgårdens IF	SHL	1	0	0	0	0	—	—	—	—	—
2012–13	Djurgårdens IF	J20	2	1	1	2	0	1	0	1	1	0
2012–13	Djurgårdens IF	Allsv	46	14	18	32	14	3	0	3	3	0
2013–14	Frölunda HC	SHL	50	16	5	21	8	7	1	0	1	0
2014–15	Columbus Blue Jackets	NHL	68	4	16	20	22	—	—	—	—	—
2014–15	Springfield Falcons	AHL	6	0	3	3	12	—	—	—	—	—
2015–16	Columbus Blue Jackets	NHL	69	8	32	40	2	—	—	—	—	—
2016–17	Columbus Blue Jackets	NHL	80	13	46	59	21	5	0	1	1	2
2017–18	Columbus Blue Jackets	NHL	66	8	27	35	12	3	1	1	2	0
2018–19	Columbus Blue Jackets	NHL	75	2	23	25	12	4	0	0	0	0
2019–20	Columbus Blue Jackets	NHL	57	5	17	22	16	10	3	2	5	2
2020–21	Florida Panthers	NHL	56	17	12	29	8	6	1	1	2	0
2021–22	Seattle Kraken	NHL	80	11	26	37	28	—	—	—	—	—
2022–23	Seattle Kraken	NHL	82	13	25	38	20	14	2	5	7	2
2023–24	Seattle Kraken	NHL	60	9	16	25	14	—	—	—	—	—
2023–24	New York Rangers	NHL	19	1	4	5	0	16	1	1	2	4
2024–25	San Jose Sharks	NHL	77	10	25	35	14	—	—	—	—	—
2025–26	San Jose Sharks	NHL	80	18	37	55	18	—	—	—	—	—
NHL totals			869	119	306	425	187	58	8	11	19	10

=== International ===
Medal record

Men's ice hockey

Representing Sweden

World Championships
Bronze medal – third place	2025 Sweden/Denmark	

World Junior Championships
Silver medal – second place	2014 Sweden	
Silver medal – second place	2013 Russia	

World U18 Championships
Silver medal – second place	2012 Czech Republic	

Year	Team	Event	Result	GP	G	A	Pts	PIM
2012	Sweden	WJC18	2nd place, silver medalist(s)	6	3	6	9	0
2013	Sweden	WJC	2nd place, silver medalist(s)	6	2	1	3	0
2014	Sweden	WJC	2nd place, silver medalist(s)	7	3	4	7	2
2016	Sweden	WC	6th	8	1	7	8	4
2019	Sweden	WC	5th	6	3	7	10	0
2025	Sweden	WC	3rd place, bronze medalist(s)	10	1	3	4	2
2026	Sweden	OG	7th	5	0	0	0	0
Junior totals				19	8	11	19	2
Senior totals				29	5	17	22	6

Awards and achievements
Preceded by Ryan Murray	Columbus Blue Jackets first-round draft pick 2013	Succeeded by Kerby Rychel
