= Dominik Kubalík =

Czech ice hockey player (born 1995)

- Born: 21 August 1995 (age 31) Plzeň, Czech Republic
- Height: 6 ft 2 in (188 cm)
- Weight: 179 lb (81 kg; 12 st 11 lb)
- Position: Winger
- Shoots: Left
- NL team Former teams: EV Zug; HC Plzeň; HC Ambrì-Piotta; Chicago Blackhawks; Detroit Red Wings; Ottawa Senators
- National team: Czech Republic
- NHL draft: 191st overall, 2013; Los Angeles Kings
- Playing career: 2012–present

Dominik Kubalík (born 21 August 1995) is a Czech professional ice hockey player who is a winger for EV Zug of the National League (NL). He was drafted in the seventh round, 191st overall, by the Los Angeles Kings in the 2013 NHL entry draft. He has also played for the Chicago Blackhawks, Detroit Red Wings, and Ottawa Senators of the National Hockey League (NHL), HC Ambrì-Piotta of the NL and HC Plzeň of the Czech Extraliga (ELH).

== Playing career ==
=== Amateur ===
After coming up through the Czech Extraliga HC Plzeň 1929's junior system, he played eight games for the senior team in the 2011–12 season, scoring one goal. In June 2012, he was selected by the Sudbury Wolves of the Ontario Hockey League (OHL) 27th overall in the Canadian Hockey League's import draft. Kubalík joined the Wolves for the 2012–13 season which he recorded 17 goals, 17 assists and 34 points in 67 games. Sudbury made the 2013 OHL playoffs and in nine games, he added three goals and six points. In the first round series against the Brampton Battalion, he scored three straight game winning goals to help the team advance to the next round. However, they were eliminated from the playoffs by the Belleville Bulls in the second round. Kubalík returned to the Wolves for the 2013–14 season in which he played 36 games, marking 13 goals and 23 points. On 10 January 2014, Kubalík (along with two second-round draft picks) was traded to the Kitchener Rangers in exchange for forward Radek Faksa. After the trade, Kubalík's play fell off, registering only five goals and six points in 20 games with the Rangers.

=== Professional ===
==== Europe ====
Kubalík was selected by the Los Angeles Kings of the National Hockey League (NHL) in the seventh round, 191st overall, of the 2013 NHL entry draft. However, he went unsigned by the Kings and on 8 April 2014, Kubalík returned to HC Plzeň on a two-year contract. In his first season of his return to the Czech Extraliga in 2014–15, he scored just three goals and seven points in 35 games. In the team's four playoff games, he recorded one goal and two points. Following the season, he met with his coach Martin Straka, who criticized his play and fitness and challenged him to be a better player. The following year in 2015–16, he broke out, recording 25 goals and 40 points in 48 games. In eleven playoff games, he registered one goal and four points as the team were only eliminated in the semifinal round. For the season, the team earned the league's bronze medal and Kubalík was the league's top scorer. In the 2016–17 season he improved his scoring again, marking 29 goals and 48 points in 51 games as HC Plzeň made it to the playoffs again, only to be knocked out in the quarterfinals.

He signed with Salavat Yulaev Ufa of the Kontinental Hockey League but was a healthy scratch as the number of import players on the team was at capacity. He ended his contract with Salavat Yulaev Ufa and on 25 August 2017, Kubalík signed a three-year contract with HC Ambrì-Piotta of the National League (NL). However, once again the import players spots were full and he was loaned back to HC Plzeň on the condition that when one of the spots opened, he could be recalled. He split the 2017–18 season between HC Ambrì-Piotta and HC Plzeň, recording 16 goals and 20 points in 20 games in the Extraliga and 10 goals and 27 points in the NL. At the end of the season HC Ambrì-Piotta were sent to the NL playouts which decide if the team would be relegated from the NL. HC Ambrì-Piotta defeated EHC Kloten in five games to remain in the NL and in the series, Kubalík scored one goal and four points. On 24 January 2019, Kubalík's NHL rights were traded to the Chicago Blackhawks in exchange for a 2019 fifth-round pick. He finished the 2018–19 season with 57 points in 50 games, and was named the Switzerland Hockey National League's most valuable player. HC Ambrì-Piotta advanced to the 2019 playoffs but were eliminated by EHC Biel in the first round in five games. Kubalík registered one goal and six points in the five games.

==== Chicago Blackhawks ====
On 29 May 2019, the Blackhawks signed Kubalík to a one-year, $925,000 contract. He made his NHL debut in Chicago's season opening game on 4 October against the Philadelphia Flyers which was played in Prague, Czechia, at the O2 Arena as part of the NHL Global Series. On 10 October, Kubalík scored his first career NHL goal in a 5–4 loss to the San Jose Sharks. At the beginning of the season, he was placed on a line with fellow Czech David Kämpf to help him become acclimated to the NHL. As the season progressed he moved up the lineup to play on a line with Jonathan Toews and Brandon Saad. From December into early January, he went on a goal-scoring streak, notching 13 goals in 15 games. On 27 February 2020, Kubalík recorded his first career NHL hat-trick in a 5–2 victory over the Tampa Bay Lightning. All three of Kubalík's goals came in the third period. He finished the regular season with 30 goals and 16 assists for 46 points in 68 games before the NHL suspended the season due to the COVID-19 pandemic on 12 March. On 15 July, Kubalík was named a finalist for the Calder Memorial Trophy (alongside Quinn Hughes and Cale Makar), which is awarded to the league's best first-year player. He was named to the NHL's All-Rookie Team.

When play resumed later in the year, the Blackhawks met the Edmonton Oilers in the 2020 Qualifying Round. In Game 1 of the series, Kubalík recorded two goals and three assists in a 6–4 win. His five points were the most scored in an NHL postseason debut in league history. Kubalík also scored the game winner in Game 4 to eliminate the Oilers. In the following series versus the top-seeded Vegas Golden Knights, Kubalík was held to just two points as the Blackhawks were eliminated in five games. Ahead of the pandemic-delayed 2020–21 season, he signed a two-year contract on 9 October with the Blackhawks. Following that first season, Kubalík's production declined as Saad left the team, and Toews missed the season. His second season in 2020–21 was marked with only 17 goals and 38 points in 56 games then his final season in Chicago, 15 goals and 32 points in 78 games.

==== Detroit Red Wings ====
As an impending restricted free agent following the conclusion of his contract on completion of the 2021–22 season, Kubalík was not tendered a qualifying offer by the rebuilding Blackhawks, and became an unrestricted free agent on 12 July 2022. On the opening day of free agency on 13 July, Kubalík signed a two-year, $5 million contract with the Detroit Red Wings. Kubalík hoped for a fresh start with the Red Wings, after struggling in his final year with the Blackhawks. He made his Red Wings debut in a 3–0 shutout victory over the Montreal Canadiens on 14 October 2022. He scored his first goal for the team in the next game on 15 October against the New Jersey Devils, putting one past Vítek Vaněček in the third period of a 5–2 win. He scored against his former team, the Blackhawks, on 9 March 2023 in a 4–3 win. In his first season with the Red Wings in 2022–23, Kubalík registered 20 goals and 45 points in 81 games.

==== Ottawa Senators ====
On 9 July 2023, Kubalík was traded to the Ottawa Senators, along with defenceman Donovan Sebrango, a conditional first-round pick in 2024 and a fourth-round pick in 2024, in exchange for forward Alex DeBrincat. He made his Senators debut on 11 October in the team's season opening 5–3 loss to the Carolina Hurricanes, playing on the third line with Rourke Chartier and Vladimir Tarasenko. He marked his first goal for Ottawa in a 5–2 victory over the Pittsburgh Penguins on 28 October. However, he struggled through the season and by the trading deadline, was widely considered the most likely to be dealt among the team's players. He was not traded and he continued to struggle for the remainder of the season, scoring a career-low 11 goals and 15 points through 74 games.

==== Return to Europe ====
On 4 September 2024, Kubalík signed a deal with Swiss club HC Ambrì-Piotta. The deal included an NHL opt-out clause, letting him sign with an NHL team and leaving his current team before 15 December. However, the deadline passed without an NHL deal and Kubalík spent the remainder of the regular season with Ambrì-Piotta, recording 27 goals and 49 points in 56 games. The team finished tenth and were forced to take part in a play-in series versus EHC Kloten to decide if they would advance to the playoffs. Kloten eliminated Ambrì-Piotta on aggregate, with Kubalík tallying three goals in four games.

On 9 May 2025, Kubalík signed a two-year contract with rival National League club EV Zug.

== International play ==
Medal record

Representing Czech Republic

Ice hockey

World Championships
Gold medal – first place	2024 Czechia	

Kubalík was selected to play for Czechia's junior team at the 2015 World Junior Championships and captained the team. He graduated to the senior team in 2018 when he was chosen to play for Czechia at the 2018 Winter Olympics. Czechia finished fourth in the tournament. He then played for Czechia at the 2018, 2019, 2021 and 2023 world championships. He joined the team again for the 2024 IIHF World Championship and won a gold medal.

== Personal life ==
Kubalík was born in Plzeň, Czech Republic. His parents managed a restaurant and a local arena. He attended to a hockey school which was located next to the arena. Kubalík's older brother, Tomáš, was a fifth-round draft pick by the Columbus Blue Jackets in the 2008 NHL entry draft, and played 12 games for the organization. He most recently played in the Czech Extraliga.

== Career statistics ==
=== Regular season and playoffs ===
			Regular season					Playoffs
Season	Team	League	GP	G	A	Pts	PIM	GP	G	A	Pts	PIM
2010–11	HC Plzeň 1929	CZE U18	42	38	21	59	32	6	4	2	6	2
2011–12	HC Plzeň 1929	CZE U18	20	22	16	38	12	2	3	0	3	2
2011–12	HC Plzeň 1929	CZE U20	24	11	6	17	22	2	1	2	3	0
2011–12	HC Plzeň 1929	ELH	8	1	0	1	0	—	—	—	—	—
2012–13	Sudbury Wolves	OHL	67	17	17	34	25	9	3	3	6	4
2013–14	Sudbury Wolves	OHL	36	13	10	23	35	—	—	—	—	—
2013–14	Kitchener Rangers	OHL	23	5	1	6	11	—	—	—	—	—
2014–15	HC Škoda Plzeň	CZE U20	16	18	9	27	14	4	3	2	5	2
2014–15	HC Škoda Plzeň	ELH	35	3	4	7	35	4	1	1	2	2
2014–15	HC Rebel Havlíčkův Brod	Czech.1	4	1	1	2	4	—	—	—	—	—
2014–15	SHC Klatovy	Czech.2	2	1	0	1	0	—	—	—	—	—
2015–16	HC Škoda Plzeň	ELH	48	25	15	40	20	11	1	3	4	8
2016–17	HC Škoda Plzeň	ELH	51	29	19	48	22	11	3	2	5	2
2017–18	HC Ambrì–Piotta	NL	25	10	17	27	39	—	—	—	—	—
2017–18	HC Škoda Plzeň	ELH	20	16	8	24	2	—	—	—	—	—
2018–19	HC Ambrì–Piotta	NL	50	25	32	57	18	5	1	5	6	6
2019–20	Chicago Blackhawks	NHL	68	30	16	46	16	9	4	4	8	4
2020–21	Chicago Blackhawks	NHL	56	17	21	38	18	—	—	—	—	—
2021–22	Chicago Blackhawks	NHL	78	15	17	32	16	—	—	—	—	—
2022–23	Detroit Red Wings	NHL	81	20	25	45	24	—	—	—	—	—
2023–24	Ottawa Senators	NHL	74	11	4	15	19	—	—	—	—	—
2024–25	HC Ambrì–Piotta	NL	52	27	22	49	10	4	3	0	3	0
2025–26	EV Zug	NL	49	22	17	39	22	4	1	0	1	0
ELH totals			162	74	46	120	79	26	5	6	11	12
NL totals			176	84	88	172	89	9	4	5	9	6
NHL totals			357	93	83	176	93	9	4	4	8	4

=== International ===
Year	Team	Event	Result	GP	G	A	Pts	PIM
2013	Czech Republic	U18	7th	5	0	5	5	14
2015	Czech Republic	WJC	6th	5	1	0	1	0
2018	Czech Republic	OG	4th	5	2	0	2	2
2018	Czech Republic	WC	7th	8	3	5	8	0
2019	Czech Republic	WC	4th	10	6	6	12	0
2021	Czech Republic	WC	7th	7	3	3	6	0
2023	Czechia	WC	8th	8	8	4	12	0
2024	Czechia	WC	1st place, gold medalist(s)	10	5	3	8	4
2026	Czechia	OG	8th	4	0	0	0	4
2026	Czechia	WC	5th	8	4	1	5	2
Junior totals				10	1	5	6	14
Senior totals				60	31	22	53	12

== Awards and honours ==
Award	Year	Ref
NL
PostFinance Top Scorer	2019	
NHL
All-Rookie Team	2020	
International
World Championship Media All-Star Team	2023	
