= 2006 IIHF World U18 Championship Division I =

International ice hockey competition

Tournament details
- Host countries: Hungary; Latvia
- Dates: 3–9 April 2006; 2–8 April 2006
- Teams: 12

The 2006 IIHF World U18 Championship Division I were a pair of international under-18 ice hockey tournaments run by the International Ice Hockey Federation. The Division I tournaments made up the second level of competition at the 2006 IIHF World U18 Championships. The Group A tournament took place between 3 April and 9 April 2006 in Miskolc, Hungary and the Group B tournament took place between 2 April and 8 April 2006 in Riga, Latvia. Switzerland and Latvia won the Group A and Group B tournaments respectively and gained promotion to the Championship Division for the 2007 IIHF World U18 Championships. While Hungary finished last in Group A and South Korea last in Group B and were both relegated to Division II for 2007.

== Group A tournament ==
The Group A tournament began on 3 April 2006 in Miskolc, Hungary. Austria, France, Kazakhstan and Slovenia all returned to compete in this years Division I tournament after missing promotion to the Championship Division at the previous years World Championships. Hungary gained promotion to Division I after finishing first in last years Division II Group B tournament and Switzerland was relegated from the Championship Division after failing to survive the relegation round at the 2005 IIHF World U18 Championship.

Switzerland won the tournament after winning four of their five games, finishing first in the group standings and gained promotion to the Championship Division for the 2007 IIHF World U18 Championships. Slovenia finished in second place after losing only to Switzerland and Kazakhstan finished in third place. Hungary finished in last place, managing to tie one of their games and lose the other four and were relegated back to Division II for the 2007 IIHF World U18 Championships. Matija Pintarič of Slovenia led the tournament in goaltending with a save percentage of 0.940, and was named the top goaltender by the IIHF directorate. Kazakhstan's Yevgeniy Rymarev was named as top forward and Marco Maurer of Switzerland was selected as top defenceman. France's Remy Rimann was the tournaments leading scorer with ten points, including five goals and five assists.

=== Standings ===
Pos	Team	Pld	W	D	L	GF	GA	GD	Pts	Promotion or relegation
1	Switzerland	5	4	1	0	18	10	+8	9	Promoted to the Championship Division for 2007
2	Slovenia	5	4	0	1	19	12	+7	8	
3	Kazakhstan	5	2	1	2	25	20	+5	5	
4	France	5	1	2	2	20	26	−6	4	
5	Austria	5	1	1	3	22	26	−4	3	
6	Hungary	5	0	1	4	14	24	−10	1	Relegated to Division II for 2007

=== Fixtures ===
All times local.

3 April 2006; 13:00	France	2 – 7 (0–4, 1–2, 1–1)	Slovenia	Miskolc Ice Hall; Attendance: 200

Game reference

3 April 2006; 16:30	Austria	4 – 10 (2–2, 1–6, 1–2)	Kazakhstan	Miskolc Ice Hall; Attendance: 300

Game reference

3 April 2006; 20:00	Hungary	2 – 5 (0–2, 2–1, 0–2)	Switzerland	Miskolc Ice Hall; Attendance: 1800

Game reference

4 April 2006; 13:00	Slovenia	5 – 4 (1–1, 4–0, 0–3)	Austria	Miskolc Ice Hall; Attendance: 200

Game reference

4 April 2006; 16:30	Switzerland	6 – 3 (1–0, 2–1, 3–2)	France	Miskolc Ice Hall; Attendance: 200

Game reference

4 April 2006; 20:00	Kazakhstan	5 – 3 (2–1, 1–2, 2–0)	Hungary	Miskolc Ice Hall; Attendance: 1600

Game reference

6 April 2006; 13:00	Switzerland	4 – 3 (1–0, 3–2, 0–1)	Austria	Miskolc Ice Hall; Attendance: 200

Game reference

6 April 2006; 16:30	Slovenia	4 – 3 (1–0, 1–2, 2–1)	Kazakhstan	Miskolc Ice Hall; Attendance: 350

Game reference

6 April 2006; 20:00	Hungary	4 – 4 (0–0, 2–2, 2–2)	France	Miskolc Ice Hall; Attendance: 1800

Game reference

8 April 2006; 13:00	Kazakhstan	2 – 2 (1–1, 1–1, 0–0)	Switzerland	Miskolc Ice Hall; Attendance: 300

Game reference

8 April 2006; 16:30	France	4 – 4 (3–2, 1–1, 0–1)	Austria	Miskolc Ice Hall; Attendance: 450

Game reference

8 April 2006; 20:00	Slovenia	3 – 2 (0–0, 0–2, 3–0)	Hungary	Miskolc Ice Hall; Attendance: 1800

Game reference

9 April 2006; 13:00	Kazakhstan	5 – 7 (1–1, 1–1, 3–5)	France	Miskolc Ice Hall; Attendance: 200

Game reference

9 April 2006; 16:30	Switzerland	1 – 0 (1–0, 0–0, 0–0)	Slovenia	Miskolc Ice Hall; Attendance: 800

Game reference

9 April 2006; 20:00	Austria	7 – 3 (3–0, 2–2, 2–1)	Hungary	Miskolc Ice Hall; Attendance: 1600

Game reference

=== Scoring leaders ===
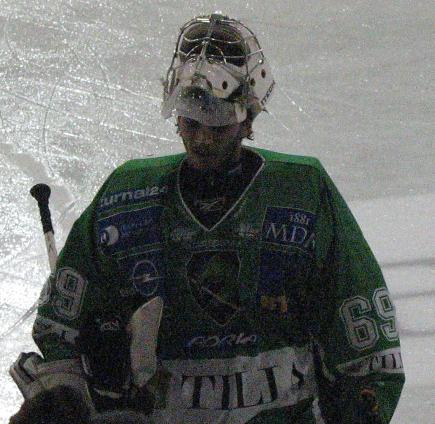
Matija Pintarič was named the tournament's best goalkeeper.

List shows the top ten skaters sorted by points, then goals.

Player	GP	G	A	Pts	+/-	PIM	POS
(France) Remy Rimann	5	5	5	10	+1	2	F
(Kazakhstan) Yevgeniy Rymarev	5	7	2	9	+3	4	F
(France) Stephane Dacosta	5	3	6	9	0	2	F
(Austria) Martin Ulmer	5	3	6	9	–1	6	F
(Austria) Daniel Oberkofler	5	4	3	7	–4	2	F
(Austria) Kristof Reinthaler	5	3	4	7	–2	2	D
(Austria) Daniel Woger	5	3	4	7	0	2	F
(France) Pierre-Charles Hordelalay	5	3	4	7	0	6	F
(Kazakhstan) Vyacheslav Polomoshnov	5	3	3	6	+4	8	F
(France) Yohann Auvitu	5	2	4	6	+1	2	D

=== Leading goaltenders ===
Only the top five goaltenders, based on save percentage, who have played at least 40% of their team's minutes are included in this list.

Player	MIP	SOG	GA	GAA	SVS%	SO
(Slovenia) Matija Pintarič	214:44	100	6	1.68	94.00	0
(Switzerland) Lukas Flueler	300:00	121	10	2.00	91.74	1
(Hungary) Akos Agardy	179:29	128	14	4.68	89.06	0
(Kazakhstan) Mikhail Smolnikov	178:45	99	11	3.69	88.89	0
(Hungary) Zoltán Hetényi	120:00	74	9	4.50	87.84	0

== Group B tournament ==
The Group B tournament began on 2 April 2006 in Riga, Latvia. Japan, Latvia, Poland and Ukraine all returned to compete in this years Division I tournament after missing promotion to the Championship Division at the previous years World Championships. South Korea gained promotion to Division I after finishing first in last years Division II Group A tournament and Denmark was relegated from the Championship Division after failing to survive the relegation round at the 2005 IIHF World U18 Championships.

Latvia won the tournament after winning all five of their games and gained promotion to the Championship Division for the 2007 IIHF World U18 Championships. Denmark finished second after losing only to Latvia and Japan finished in third place. South Korea finished in last place, managing only to tie one of their games and lose the other four and were relegated to Division II for the 2007 IIHF World U18 Championships. Arturs Dzelzs of Latvia led the tournament in goaltending with a save percentage of 0.948, and was named the top goaltender by the IIHF directorate. Denmark's Philip Larsen was named as top defenceman and Andris Džeriņš of Latvia was selected as top forward. Džeriņš also led the tournament in scoring with 13 points, including six goals and seven assists.

=== Standings ===
Pos	Team	Pld	W	D	L	GF	GA	GD	Pts	Promotion or relegation
1	Latvia	5	5	0	0	27	7	+20	10	Promoted to the Championship Division for 2007
2	Denmark	5	4	0	1	24	12	+12	8	
3	Japan	5	2	1	2	19	16	+3	5	
4	Poland	5	2	0	3	16	15	+1	4	
5	Ukraine	5	1	0	4	7	31	−24	2	
6	South Korea	5	0	1	4	11	23	−12	1	Relegated to Division II for 2007

=== Fixtures ===
All times local.

2 April 2006; 15:00	Japan	8 – 1 (1–1, 2–0, 5–0)	Ukraine	Arena Riga; Attendance: 250

Game reference

2 April 2006; 17:00	South Korea	1 – 3 (0–0, 1–1, 0–2)	Denmark	Volvo Sportcenter; Attendance: 105

Game reference

2 April 2006; 19:00	Poland	0 – 1 (0–0, 0–1, 0–0)	Latvia	Arena Riga; Attendance: 2500

Game reference

3 April 2006; 15:00	Denmark	5 – 2 (1–0, 0–2, 4–0)	Poland	Arena Riga; Attendance: 176

Game reference

3 April 2006; 17:00	Ukraine	5 – 2 (1–0, 3–2, 1–0)	South Korea	Volvo Sportcenter; Attendance: 73

Game reference

3 April 2006; 19:00	Latvia	6 – 1 (0–1, 2–0, 4–0)	Japan	Arena Riga; Attendance: 3500

Game reference

5 April 2006; 15:00	Denmark	5 – 2 (2–1, 1–0, 2–1)	Japan	Arena Riga; Attendance: 120

Game reference

5 April 2006; 17:00	South Korea	3 – 6 (0–0, 1–5, 2–1)	Poland	Volvo Sportcenter; Attendance: 120

Game reference

5 April 2006; 19:00	Latvia	7 – 0 (2–0, 2–0, 3–0)	Ukraine	Arena Riga; Attendance: 4000

Game reference

6 April 2006; 15:00	Ukraine	0 – 7 (0–1, 0–3, 0–3)	Denmark	Arena Riga; Attendance: 130

Game reference

6 April 2006; 17:00	Poland	1 – 5 (0–0, 0–3, 1–2)	Japan	Volvo Sportcenter; Attendance: 102

Game reference

6 April 2006; 19:00	Latvia	6 – 2 (1–0, 5–1, 0–1)	South Korea	Arena Riga; Attendance: 2500

Game reference

8 April 2006; 11:00	Japan	3 – 3 (2–1, 0–1, 1–1)	South Korea	Arena Riga; Attendance: 85

Game reference

8 April 2006; 14:30	Ukraine	1 – 7 (0–2, 0–2, 1–3)	Poland	Arena Riga; Attendance: 310

Game reference

8 April 2006; 18:00	Denmark	4 – 7 (3–2, 1–2, 0–3)	Latvia	10000

Game reference

=== Scoring leaders ===
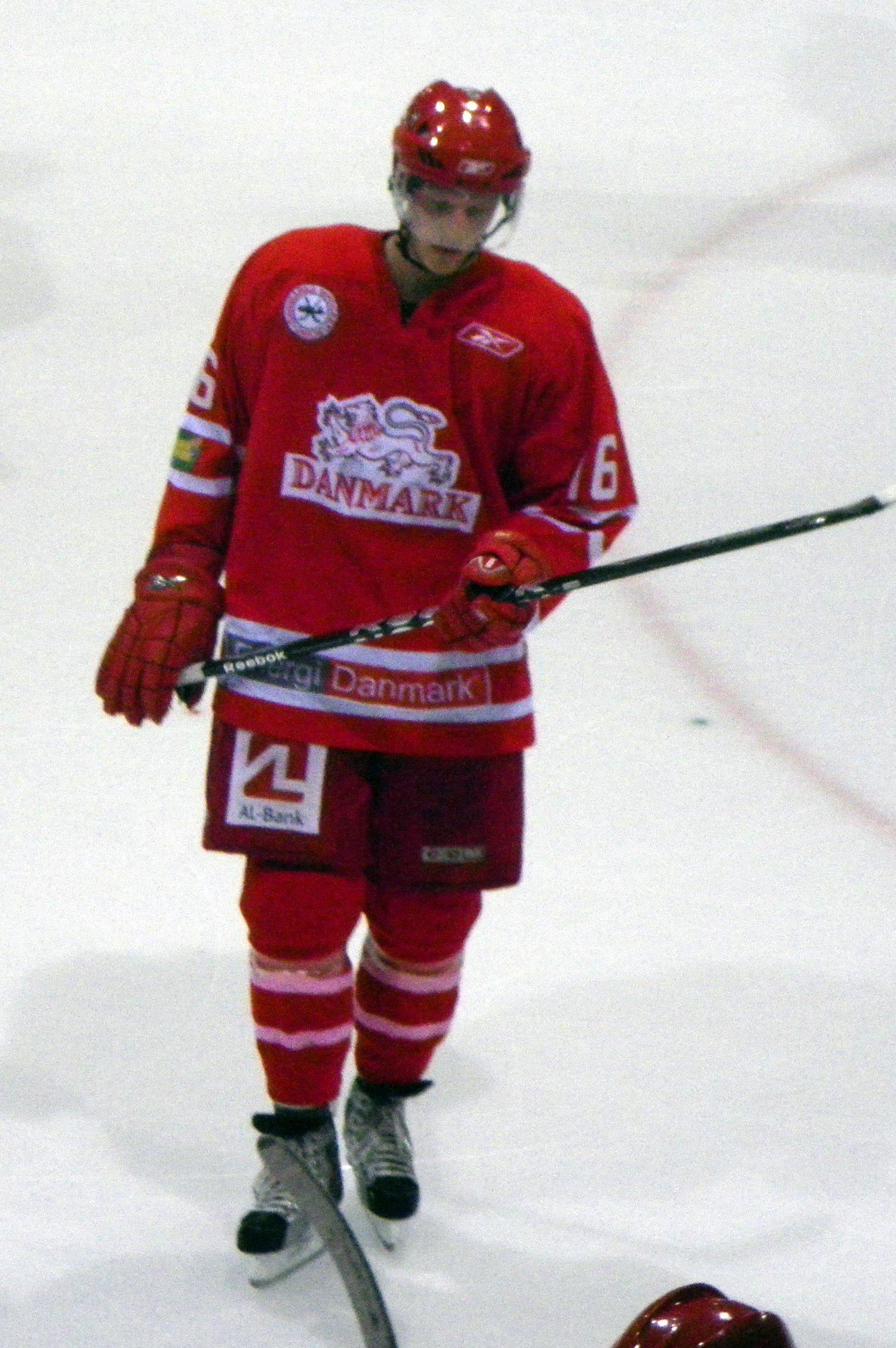
Lars Eller scored five goals and five assists to finish fifth in scoring.

List shows the top ten skaters sorted by points, then goals.

Player	GP	G	A	Pts	+/-	PIM	POS
(Latvia) Andris Džeriņš	5	6	7	13	+11	4	F
(Latvia) Gatis Gricinskis	5	6	6	12	+10	10	F
(Latvia) Arturs Ozolins	5	3	9	12	+10	4	F
(Denmark) Nichlas Hardt	5	4	7	11	+6	6	F
(Denmark) Lars Eller	5	5	5	10	+4	8	F
(Latvia) Kaspars Daugaviņš	5	5	4	9	+6	20	F
(Japan) Naoto Mizuuchi	5	3	3	6	+6	0	F
(Denmark) Philip Larsen	5	3	3	6	+1	12	D
(Poland) Krystian Dziubinski	5	1	5	6	+3	4	F
(Poland) Maciej Szewczyk	5	4	1	5	+2	6	F

=== Leading goaltenders ===
Only the top five goaltenders, based on save percentage, who have played at least 40% of their team's minutes are included in this list.

Player	MIP	SOG	GA	GAA	SVS%	SO
(Latvia) Arturs Dzelzs	300:00	134	7	1.40	94.78	2
(Poland) Michal Strak	286:32	163	14	2.93	91.41	1
(Denmark) Frederik Andersen	280:00	130	12	2.57	90.77	1
(Japan) Yusuke Terashima	180:00	69	7	2.33	89.86	0
(South Korea) Lee Won	233:21	145	21	5.40	85.52	0
