= Oliver Lauridsen =

Danish ice hockey player (born 1989)

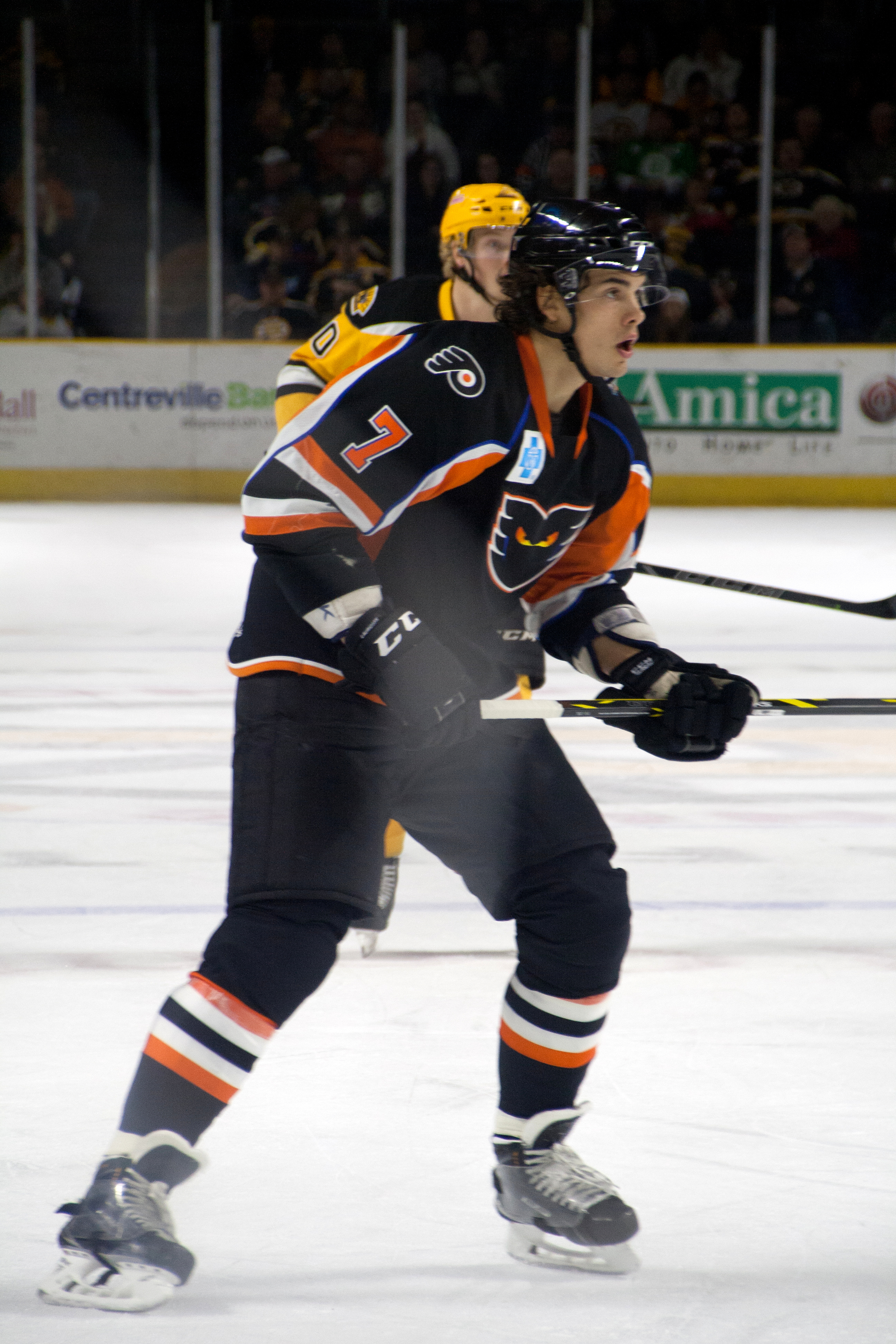
- Born: 24 March 1989 (age 37) Gentofte, Denmark
- Height: 6 ft 6 in (198 cm)
- Weight: 229 lb (104 kg; 16 st 5 lb)
- Position: Defence
- Shoots: Left
- Liiga team Former teams: HC TPS; Philadelphia Flyers; Frölunda HC; Jokerit; Malmö Redhawks
- National team: Denmark
- NHL draft: 196th overall, 2009; Philadelphia Flyers
- Playing career: 2011–present

Oliver Holton Lauridsen (born 24 March 1989) is a Danish professional ice hockey player who is a defenceman for HC TPS of the Liiga. He previously played for the Philadelphia Flyers of the National Hockey League (NHL). He is the older brother to fellow international, Markus.

== Playing career ==
Lauridsen hails from Gentofte, Denmark, where he started playing ice hockey in the youth ranks of IC Gentofte. He moved to Sweden in 2005 to join Rögle BK before heading to Linköping HC one year later. He played for both clubs at the youth level. In 2008, Lauridsen enrolled at St. Cloud State University.

He was drafted by the Philadelphia Flyers 196th overall in the 2009 NHL Entry Draft and signed a two-year entry-level contract with the Flyers on 15 March 2011 after his third season of college hockey at St. Cloud State.

On 29 March 2013, after spending one season with the Adirondack Phantoms he was called up to replace the injured Braydon Coburn. He debuted the next day in a game against the Boston Bruins. A month later, Lauridsen scored his first NHL goal after Boston defenseman Zdeno Chára's attempt to clear the puck deep in his own zone managed to slip past Boston goaltender Anton Khudobin and into the net. Lauridsen was credited with the goal since he was the last Flyers player to have touched the puck and it proved to be the game-winning goal. Two days later he scored the game-winner again, this time via a slapshot that eluded New York Islanders goaltender Kevin Poulin. During his time in North America, he played a total of 16 NHL contests for the Flyers and 264 games in the American Hockey League for the Adirondack Phantoms and Lehigh Valley Phantoms.

On 13 July 2015, Lauridsen signed with Frölunda HC of the Swedish Hockey League and helped the team win the Swedish national championship and the Champions Hockey League in the 2015–16 season. In April 2016, he penned a deal with Helsinki based KHL team Jokerit.

After four seasons in the KHL with Jokerit, Lauridsen opted to return to the SHL, agreeing to a three-year contract with the Malmö Redhawks on 29 April 2020.

== Career statistics ==
=== Regular season and playoffs ===
			Regular season					Playoffs
Season	Team	League	GP	G	A	Pts	PIM	GP	G	A	Pts	PIM
2004–05	IC Gentofte	DEN U20	24	4	12	16	22	—	—	—	—	—
2004–05	IC Gentofte	DEN.2	8	0	1	1	0	—	—	—	—	—
2005–06	Rögle BK	J20	28	1	1	2	32	—	—	—	—	—
2006–07	Linköpings HC	J20	34	0	2	2	95	5	0	0	0	8
2007–08	Linköpings HC	J18	2	1	3	4	0	—	—	—	—	—
2007–08	Linköpings HC	J20	35	5	6	11	159	1	0	1	1	0
2007–08	Tranås AIF	Div.1	1	0	0	0	0	—	—	—	—	—
2008–09	St. Cloud State Huskies	WCHA	28	0	1	1	38	—	—	—	—	—
2009–10	St. Cloud State Huskies	WCHA	43	6	6	12	54	—	—	—	—	—
2010–11	St. Cloud State Huskies	WCHA	37	1	8	9	51	—	—	—	—	—
2010–11	Adirondack Phantoms	AHL	2	0	0	0	30	—	—	—	—	—
2011–12	Adirondack Phantoms	AHL	65	3	4	7	85	—	—	—	—	—
2012–13	Adirondack Phantoms	AHL	59	1	5	6	77	—	—	—	—	—
2012–13	Philadelphia Flyers	NHL	15	2	1	3	34	—	—	—	—	—
2013–14	Adirondack Phantoms	AHL	63	1	10	11	167	—	—	—	—	—
2014–15	Lehigh Valley Phantoms	AHL	75	4	6	10	152	—	—	—	—	—
2014–15	Philadelphia Flyers	NHL	1	0	0	0	10	—	—	—	—	—
2015–16	Frölunda HC	SHL	42	1	3	4	67	16	1	3	4	10
2016–17	Jokerit	KHL	48	3	6	9	33	4	0	0	0	11
2017–18	Jokerit	KHL	54	1	3	4	38	11	0	1	1	14
2018–19	Jokerit	KHL	55	2	11	13	93	6	0	0	0	6
2019–20	Jokerit	KHL	24	1	0	1	17	4	1	0	1	0
2020–21	Malmö Redhawks	SHL	48	3	4	7	38	2	0	0	0	6
2021–22	Malmö Redhawks	SHL	42	3	0	3	41	—	—	—	—	—
2022–23	Malmö Redhawks	SHL	49	4	8	12	43	—	—	—	—	—
2023–24	TPS	Liiga	57	3	6	9	70	8	1	0	1	2
2024–25	TPS	Liiga	56	2	11	13	72	5	0	0	0	16
NHL totals			16	2	1	3	44	—	—	—	—	—
SHL totals			181	11	15	26	189	18	1	3	4	16
KHL totals			181	7	20	27	181	25	1	1	2	31
Liiga totals			155	6	23	29	170	13	1	0	1	18

=== International ===
Year	Team	Event	GP	G	A	Pts	PIM
2006	Denmark	U18 D1	5	0	0	0	4
2007	Denmark	WJC D1	5	0	1	1	6
2007	Denmark	U18 D1	5	1	2	3	16
2008	Denmark	WJC	6	0	2	2	14
2009	Denmark	WJC D1	5	0	0	0	6
2013	Denmark	WC	7	0	0	0	6
2014	Denmark	WC	7	0	0	0	14
2015	Denmark	WC	7	0	1	1	4
2016	Denmark	WC	8	0	0	0	6
2016	Denmark	OGQ	3	0	0	0	2
2017	Denmark	WC	7	0	2	2	10
2018	Denmark	WC	7	0	2	2	0
2019	Denmark	WC	7	0	1	1	6
2021	Denmark	WC	7	0	0	0	2
2021	Denmark	OGQ	3	0	2	2	2
2022	Denmark	OG	5	0	1	1	2
2022	Denmark	WC	2	0	1	1	0
2023	Denmark	WC	5	0	0	0	2
2024	Denmark	WC	6	0	1	1	2
2024	Denmark	OGQ	3	0	0	0	2
2025	Denmark	WC	10	0	0	0	6
2026	Denmark	OG	4	0	1	1	4
Junior totals			26	1	5	6	46
Senior totals			98	0	12	12	70
