= Marco Maurer =

Swiss ice hockey player

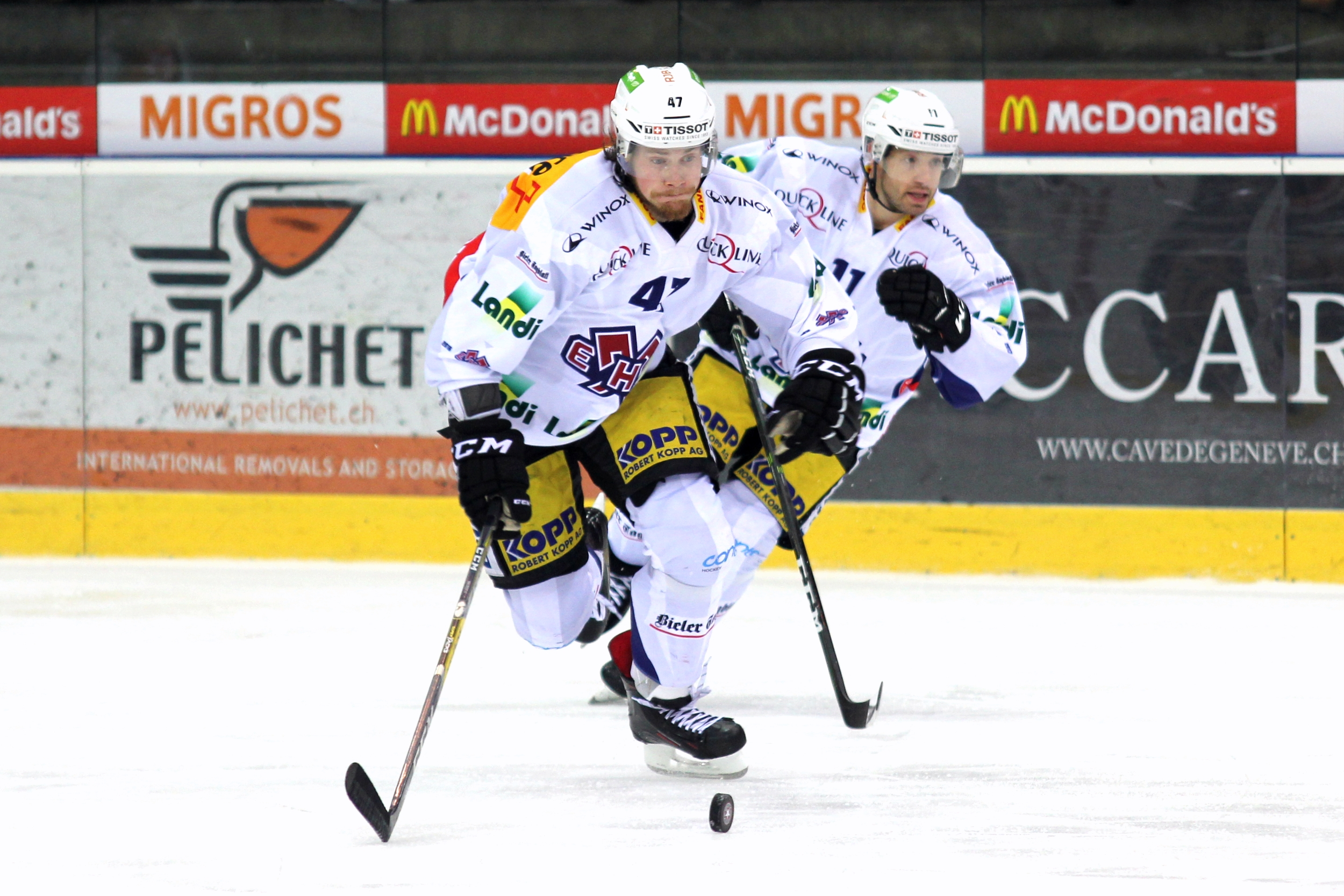
- Marco Maurer (B 47), Jacob Micflikier (B 11).
- Born: February 21, 1988 (age 37); Affoltern am Albis, Switzerland
- Height: 6 ft 2 in (188 cm)
- Weight: 215 lb (98 kg; 15 st 5 lb)
- Position: Defence
- Shoots: Left
- SL team Former teams: HC Sierre; EV Zug; Genève-Servette HC; Lausanne HC; SC Rapperswil-Jona Lakers; ZSC Lions; HC Lugano; EHC Biel; SC Bern; HC Ajoie
- Playing career: 2006–present

Marco Maurer (born February 21, 1988) is a Swiss professional ice hockey defenceman who currently plays with HC Sierre of the Swiss League (SL). He previously played with EV Zug, the SC Rapperswil-Jona Lakers, the ZSC Lions, HC Lugano and EHC Biel.

== Playing career ==
Maurer made his National League debut playing with EV Zug during the 2005–06 NLA season. The same season with the Swiss junior selection, he won the WJC-U18 D1, allowing Switzerland to be promoted to the elite group. During the World Junior Championship of 2007, he broke his neck in a game against Finland.

On December 22, 2008, he signed with Genève-Servette HC for the 2009-2010 season. During this season, he was loaned to Lausanne HC for the end of the playoffs and won the LNB championship.

On March 22, 2010, Maurer signed a two-year contract with SC Rapperswil-Jona Lakers.

On November 19, 2011, during a match against HC Davos, he suffered a wrist injury which ended his season.

On December 12, 2011, he signed a contract which linked him to ZSC Lions until the summer of 2014. During the Spengler Cup of 2012, he was loaned to Adler Mannheim. He played 3 games with them, obtaining no points and 4 minutes of penalties. Mannheim was eliminated in the quarter-finals by HC Fribourg-Gottéron.

While he signed a contract with HC Lugano a few days earlier for the next two seasons, he was traded by ZSC Lions to Lugano in return for Dan Fritsche. On January 4, 2014, during a match against Lausanne HC, a puck was deflected into the public. His wife, Sabrina, was hit in the head and lost an eye. Maurer and his wife must file a lawsuit against HC Lugano, which refuses to take responsibility, due to the fact that Sabrina had not bought her ticket.

On January 7, 2015, despite a contract valid for one more season with HC Lugano, Maurer did not see himself continuing with this club and signed with EHC Biel for the next two seasons. On December 12, 2016, he extended for two years with EHC Biel. On December 24, 2017, Maurer detains a thief in the streets of Zug until the police intervene.

Coming to the end of his contract, Maurer wishes to extend his adventure with Biel, but the sports director does not offer him a sufficient salary in his eyes. On January 17, 2019, Maurer agreed to a two-year contract for the 2019/20 and 2020/21 season to return to Genève-Servette HC.

On June 2, 2020, Maurer was signed to an early one-year contract extension by Servette through the 2021/22 season.

On 20 February 2022, he was signed to a two-years contract extension by Servette. Finalist the previous season, Genève-Servette becomes champion during the season 2022-23.

Lacking playing time, Maurer is loaned to SC Bern at the beginning of December 2023. This loan results in a transfer until the end of the season. Although not having played in the final of the CHL, Maurer played 7 games for Geneva in this competition and the club gave him a medal and included him in the champion squad of 2023-24.

On June 19, 2024, Maurer signed with HC Ajoie for one season.

On June 13, 2025, Maurer signed a one-year contract with HC Sierre.

== Career statistics ==
=== Regular season and playoffs ===
			Regular season					Playoffs
Season	Team	League	GP	G	A	Pts	PIM	GP	G	A	Pts	PIM
2005-06	EV Zug	NLA	8	0	0	0	0	-	-	-	-	-
2006-07	EV Zug	NLA	13	0	0	0	2	-	-	-	-	-
2007-08	EV Zug	NLA	44	1	1	2	24	7	0	0	0	2
2007-08	Switzerland U20	NLB	2	1	1	2	4	-	-	-	-	-
2008-09	EV Zug	NLA	50	1	1	2	26	10	1	1	2	14
2009-10	Genève-Servette HC	NLA	49	1	3	4	52	20	2	0	2	16
2009-10	Lausanne HC	NLB	1	1	0	1	6	2	0	1	1	6
2010-11	SC Rapperswil-Jona Lakers	NLA	48	4	2	6	115	5	1	0	1	31
2010-11	SC Rapperswil-Jona Lakers	NLA Qualification	5	1	0	1	31	-	-	-	-	-
2011-12	SC Rapperswil-Jona Lakers	NLA	23	3	2	5	65	-	-	-	-	-
2012-13	ZSC Lions	NLA	50	4	8	12	34	12	0	0	0	6
2012	ZSC Lions	ET	8	1	0	1	18	-	-	-	-	-
2012	Adler Mannheim	Spengler Cup	3	0	0	0	4	-	-	-	-	-
2013-14	ZSC Lions	NLA	26	0	3	3	14	-	-	-	-	-
2013	ZSC Lions	ET	8	0	0	0	14	-	-	-	-	-
2013-14	HC Lugano	NLA	21	2	2	4	65	5	0	0	0	33
2014-15	HC Lugano	NLA	38	2	7	9	80	6	1	0	1	4
2014-15	HC Lugano	Swiss Cup	1	0	1	1	0	-	-	-	-	-
2014	Jokerit	Spengler Cup	3	0	0	0	2	-	-	-	-	-
2015-16	EHC Biel	NLA	50	2	6	8	56	5	0	0	0	6
2015-16	EHC Biel	NLA Qualification	5	0	0	0	6	-	-	-	-	-
2015-16	EHC Biel	Swiss Cup	2	0	0	0	2	-	-	-	-	-
2016-17	EHC Biel	NLA	48	4	7	11	79	5	0	0	0	4
2016-17	EHC Biel	Swiss Cup	2	0	0	0	14	-	-	-	-	-
2017-18	EHC Biel	NL	40	2	8	10	30	10	0	0	0	10
2017-18	EHC Biel	Swiss Cup	2	0	0	0	0	-	-	-	-	-
2018-19	EHC Biel	NL	43	1	5	6	34	12	1	0	1	10
2018-19	EHC Biel	Swiss Cup	2	0	0	0	2	-	-	-	-	-
2019-20	Genève-Servette HC	NL	45	2	8	10	60	-	-	-	-	-
2019-20	Genève-Servette HC	Swiss Cup	2	0	0	0	2	-	-	-	-	-
2020-21	Genève-Servette HC	NL	24	1	1	2	22	-	-	-	-	-
2020-21	Genève-Servette HC	Swiss Cup	2	0	0	0	4	-	-	-	-	-
2021-22	Genève-Servette HC	NL	52	1	4	5	59	2	0	1	1	2
2022-23	Genève-Servette HC	NL	48	3	8	11	28	17	0	3	3	32
2023-24	Genève-Servette HC	NL	18	1	1	2	4	-	-	-	-	-
2023-24	Genève-Servette HC	CHL	7	0	1	1	0	-	-	-	-	-
2023-24	SC Bern	NL	19	0	1	1	39	5	0	0	0	2
NL totals			757	35	78	113	888	121	6	5	11	172

=== International ===
Year	Team	Event	Result	GP	G	A	Pts	PIM
2006	Switzerland	U18 D1	1st place, gold medalist(s)	5	2	1	3	49
2007	Switzerland	WJC	7th	3	0	0	0	0
2008	Switzerland	WJC	9th	6	1	0	1	12
Junior totals				14	3	1	4	61
