= Markus Lauridsen =

Danish ice hockey player (born 1991)

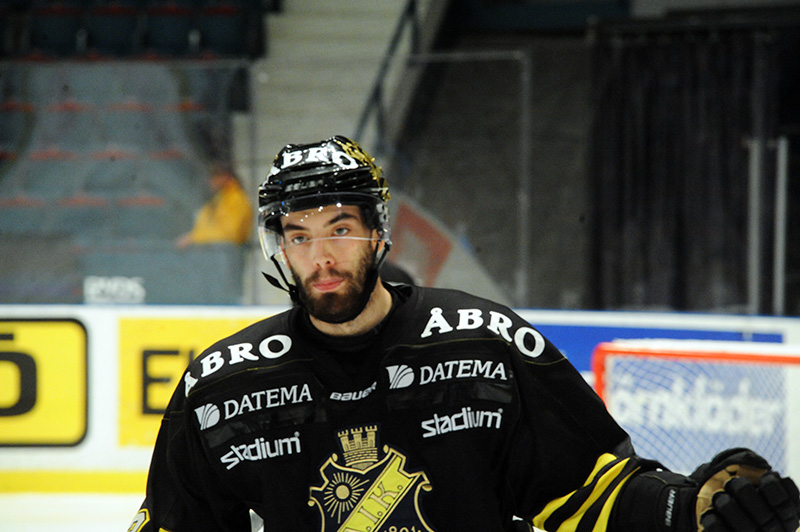
- Lauridsen in 2015
- Born: 28 February 1991 (age 35) Gentofte, Denmark
- Height: 6 ft 2 in (188 cm)
- Weight: 196 lb (89 kg; 14 st 0 lb)
- Position: Defence
- Shoots: Left
- ICEHL team Former teams: HC Pustertal Wölfe; Lake Erie Monsters; Leksands IF; EHC München; HV71; Malmö Redhawks; Löwen Frankfurt
- National team: Denmark
- NHL draft: Undrafted
- Playing career: 2012–present

Markus Holton Lauridsen (born 28 February 1991) is a Danish professional ice hockey player who is a defenceman for HC Pustertal Wölfe of the ICE Hockey League (ICEHL). He is the younger brother to Oliver Lauridsen.

== Playing career ==
Lauridsen originally played in his native Denmark with his hometown lower division club IC Gentofte before moving to join the Swedish youth team of Linköping HC. After one season in the J20 SuperElit in 2008–09, and with NHL aspirations, Lauridsen moved to North America to pursue a junior career in the United States Hockey League with the Green Bay Gamblers. Undrafted, Lauridsen was an overage player in his second season with the Gamblers in 2011–12, posting 30 points in 58 games.

On the back of helping Green Bay capture the Clark Cup Championship, Lauridsen accepted an invite to join the Colorado Avalanche's 2012 training camp on 22 August 2012. With the NHL lockout cancelling Colorado's training camp, Lauridsen was assigned to participate in the training camp of Avalanche AHL affiliate, the Lake Erie Monsters. Signed to an AHL contract with the Monsters, Lauridsen was then reassigned to begin his professional career in the 2012–13 season, with inaugural Central Hockey League affiliate, the Denver Cutthroats.

Lauridsen scored his first professional goal in his first game at the Cutthroats season opener on 19 October 2012. He posted 15 points to lead the Cutthroats defence before he received a second recall to remain with the Lake Erie Monsters, finishing with 12 assists in 36 games. Towards the completion of his first professional year, Lauridsen signed a two-year entry-level contract with the Avalanche.

After three years within the Colorado Avalanche organization without being able to reach the NHL, Lauridsen signed as an impending restricted free agent to a one-year deal with Swedish second-tier club AIK IF of the HockeyAllsvenskan on 16 June 2015. In the 2015–16 season with AIK, Lauridsen cemented a role on the blueline, contributing with 21 points in 50 games, and was instrumental in helping the club compete in the playoffs for promotion to the SHL.

On 14 April 2016, Lauridsen left AIK to sign a lucrative two-year contract with top-tier SHL club Leksands IF. He left the team after the conclusion of the 2016–17 season and signed a deal with German Deutsche Eishockey Liga side EHC München in May 2017.

Lauridsen played a lone season in Germany, appearing in 32 regular season games for 7 points before helping EHC München to their third straight championship in the post-season. On 30 April 2018, Lauridsen opted to return to the SHL, signing a two-year contract with HV71. Following two seasons with HV71, Lauridsen moved to his third SHL club, agreeing to a two-year contract with the Malmö Redhawks on 30 March 2020.

Following 33 points in 74 games for the team in his first two seasons, and a combined plus-minus of +10, Malmö Redhawks announced on the 5th of April 2022 that they had signed Lauridsen to a 2-year contract extension, keeping him at the club into the 2023-24 season.

== International play ==
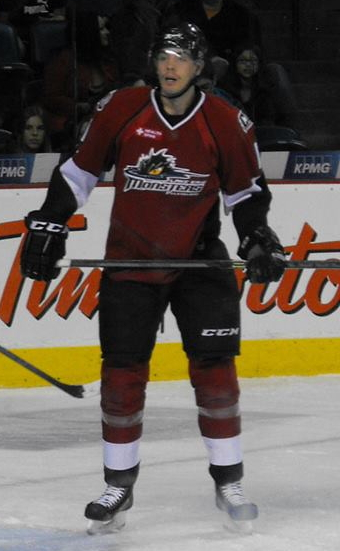
Lauridsen during his tenure with the Monsters.

Lauridsen has been an established member of the Danish junior team, competing in various World U18 Championships and World Junior Championships. In the 2010 Championship, Lauridsen was named as the Division I Best Defenceman for the tournament and repeated his performance the following 2011 Championship to lead all defenceman in points.

After the completion of his first professional season, Lauridsen was named to the Danish squad to make his senior debut at the 2013 World Championships in Sweden. He played his first full international in an opening game defeat to Canada on 4 May 2013. Playing alongside brother Oliver, he appeared in every game for Denmark to finish with one assist in 7 games to help avoid relegation and finish in 12th place.

== Career statistics ==
=== Regular season and playoffs ===
			Regular season					Playoffs
Season	Team	League	GP	G	A	Pts	PIM	GP	G	A	Pts	PIM
2004–05	IC Gentofte	DEN U20	2	0	0	0	0	—	—	—	—	—
2005–06	IC Gentofte	DEN U20	14	2	4	6	26	—	—	—	—	—
2006–07	IC Gentofte	DEN U20	24	4	9	13	50	—	—	—	—	—
2006–07	IC Gentofte	DEN.2	2	0	0	0	0	—	—	—	—	—
2007–08	Linköpings HC	J18	11	2	2	4	8	—	—	—	—	—
2008–09	Linköpings HC	J18	17	1	3	4	10	—	—	—	—	—
2008–09	Linköpings HC	J18 Allsv	10	4	3	7	8	3	0	0	0	4
2009–10	Linköpings HC	J20	37	0	3	3	12	6	0	0	0	2
2010–11	Green Bay Gamblers	USHL	44	5	5	10	16	11	0	4	4	0
2011–12	Green Bay Gamblers	USHL	58	6	24	30	32	11	3	1	4	8
2012–13	Denver Cutthroats	CHL	30	6	9	15	14	—	—	—	—	—
2012–13	Lake Erie Monsters	AHL	36	0	12	12	16	—	—	—	—	—
2013–14	Lake Erie Monsters	AHL	39	3	9	12	14	—	—	—	—	—
2014–15	Lake Erie Monsters	AHL	62	5	11	16	22	—	—	—	—	—
2015–16	AIK	Allsv	50	8	13	21	28	8	0	0	0	0
2016–17	Leksands IF	SHL	48	4	9	13	2	—	—	—	—	—
2017–18	EHC Red Bull München	DEL	32	2	5	7	16	8	2	1	3	4
2018–19	HV71	SHL	49	1	7	8	8	9	1	1	2	2
2019–20	HV71	SHL	52	3	27	30	8	—	—	—	—	—
2020–21	Malmö Redhawks	SHL	34	0	14	14	10	2	0	1	1	0
2021–22	Malmö Redhawks	SHL	40	2	17	19	6	—	—	—	—	—
2022–23	Malmö Redhawks	SHL	40	4	5	9	10	—	—	—	—	—
2023–24	Malmö Redhawks	SHL	28	2	4	6	2	—	—	—	—	—
2023–24	Löwen Frankfurt	DEL	16	2	4	6	2	—	—	—	—	—
2024–25	Löwen Frankfurt	DEL	40	2	12	14	16	2	0	0	0	0
AHL totals			137	8	32	40	52	—	—	—	—	—
SHL totals			291	16	83	99	46	11	1	2	3	2

=== International ===
Year	Team	Event	Result	GP	G	A	Pts	PIM
2008	Denmark	U18	10th	6	0	1	1	8
2009	Denmark	U18 D1	14th	5	0	0	0	2
2010	Denmark	WJC D1	13th	5	0	3	3	4
2011	Denmark	WJC D1	12th	5	1	6	7	2
2013	Denmark	WC	12th	7	0	1	1	4
2014	Denmark	WC	13th	6	0	0	0	4
2015	Denmark	WC	14th	7	0	0	0	20
2016	Denmark	WC	8th	8	1	1	2	6
2016	Denmark	OGQ	DNQ	3	0	0	0	0
2017	Denmark	WC	12th	7	1	0	1	2
2019	Denmark	WC	11th	7	1	3	4	4
2021	Denmark	WC	12th	7	2	5	7	0
2021	Denmark	OGQ	Q	3	0	7	7	0
2022	Denmark	OG	7th	5	2	1	3	0
2022	Denmark	WC	9th	7	1	7	8	10
2023	Denmark	WC	10th	7	0	6	6	10
2024	Denmark	WC	13th	7	1	1	2	2
2024	Denmark	OGQ	Q	3	1	3	4	0
2025	Denmark	WC	4th	10	2	3	5	2
2026	Denmark	OG	9th	3	0	1	1	0
2026	Denmark	WC	12th	7	0	0	0	8
Junior totals				21	1	10	11	16
Senior totals				104	12	39	51	72
