= Alexander Sundberg =

Danish ice hockey player (born 1981)

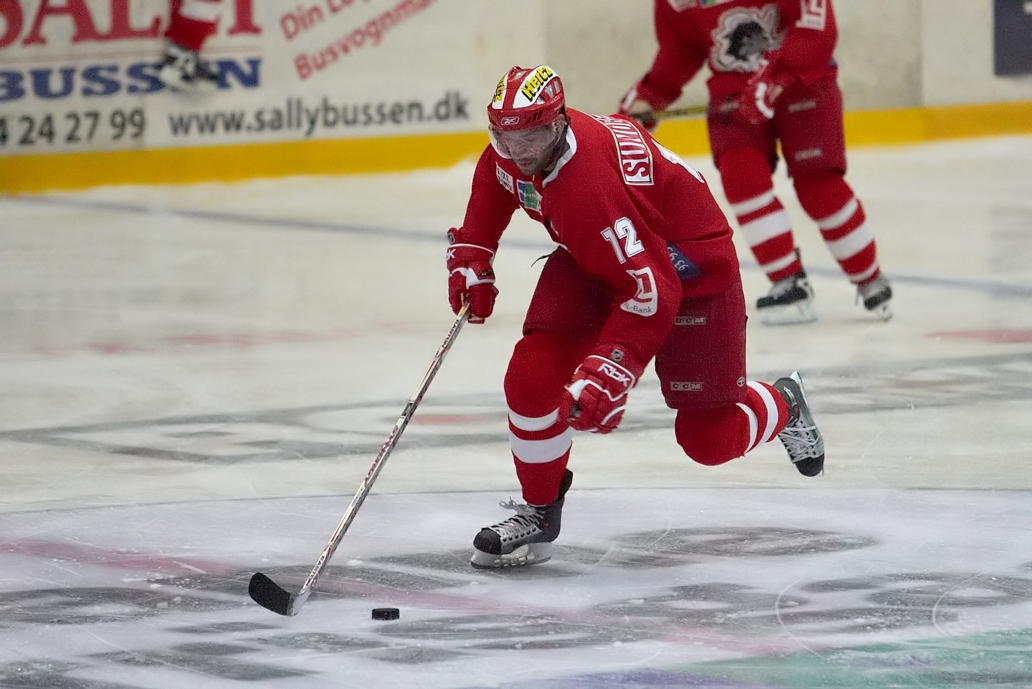
- Born: January 19, 1981 (age 45) Copenhagen, Denmark
- Height: 6 ft 4 in (193 cm)
- Weight: 198 lb (90 kg; 14 st 2 lb)
- Position: Left wing
- Shot: Left
- National team: Denmark
- NHL draft: Undrafted
- Playing career: 1998–2011

Alexander Sundberg (born January 19, 1981) is a Danish retired ice hockey player who participated at the 2010 IIHF World Championship as a member of the Denmark national men's ice hockey team.
