= Denmark men's national ice hockey team =

Men's national ice hockey team representing Denmark

Denmark
- Nickname: Danish Lions
- Association: Danmarks Ishockey Union
- General manager: Morten Green
- Head coach: Tommy Samuelsson
- Assistants: Andreas Lilja; Morten Madsen
- Captain: Jesper Jensen Aabo
- Most games: Morten Poulsen (361)
- Top scorer: Jens Nielsen (72)
- Most points: Jens Nielsen (151)
- Team colors
- IIHF code: DEN
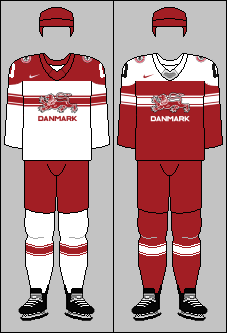

Ranking
- Current IIHF: 10 ▼1 (3 June 2026)
- Highest IIHF: 8 (2025)
- Lowest IIHF: 15 (2006, 2014–15)

First international
- Canada 47–0 Denmark (Stockholm, Sweden; 12 February 1949)

Biggest win
- Denmark 27–4 Belgium (Copenhagen, Denmark; 18 March 1977)

Biggest defeat
- Canada 47–0 Denmark (Stockholm, Sweden; 12 February 1949)

Olympics
- Appearances: 2 (first in 2022)

IIHF World Championships
- Appearances: 58 (first in 1949)
- Best result: 4th (2025)

International record (W–L–T)
- 392–514–58

The Danish national men's ice hockey team is the national ice hockey team for Denmark. The team is controlled by Danmarks Ishockey Union. It was founded in 1949, and as of 2022, the Danish team was ranked 10th in the IIHF World Rankings. Denmark currently has 4,255 players (0.07% of its population). Their coach is Swedish Tommy Samuelsson. Denmark once held the record for the largest loss when they were defeated by Canada in 1949, 47–0, only being surpassed by New Zealand who were defeated by Australia 58–0 in 1987.

== History ==
The team played its first world championship in 1949, led by player-coach and captain Jørgen Hviid. Denmark lost its first game played, by a 47–0 score to the Canada men's national team.

Denmark subsequently played 53 years in lower divisions. At the 2002 Men's Ice Hockey World Championships, the team finished first in Division I-B to earn promotion to the top level for the 2003 IIHF World Championship, and has remained in the top pool since, due to developed higher calibre players. The 2002 and 2003 versions of the Denmark men's national teams were recognized with the IIHF Milestone Award in 2025, for earning promotion to and remaining at the top tier of the World Championships.

Denmark finished the 2003 Men's Ice Hockey World Championships in 11th place, defeating the United States men's national team 5–2, and tying Canada 2–2. At the 2010 World Championships, Denmark finished 8th place, their best placing at the time. The feat was repeated in 2016. At the 2022 Men's Ice Hockey World Championships Denmark finished in ninth place, and earned their first victory versus Canada, in 73 years of competition, by a 3–2 score.

At the 2025 IIHF World Championship, co-hosts Denmark reached its first semifinals, after defeating Canada in the quarterfinals, in one of the biggest upsets in the World Championships. (Note: Attributed to multiple sources:) Denmark played in their first medal game, losing to Switzerland in the semifinal to Sweden in the bronze medal game.

== Tournament record ==
=== Olympic Games ===
Year	Finish	Rank
(China) 2022 Beijing	Quarterfinals	7th
(Italy) 2026 Milan / Cortina d'Ampezzo	Qualification playoffs	9th

=== World Championship ===
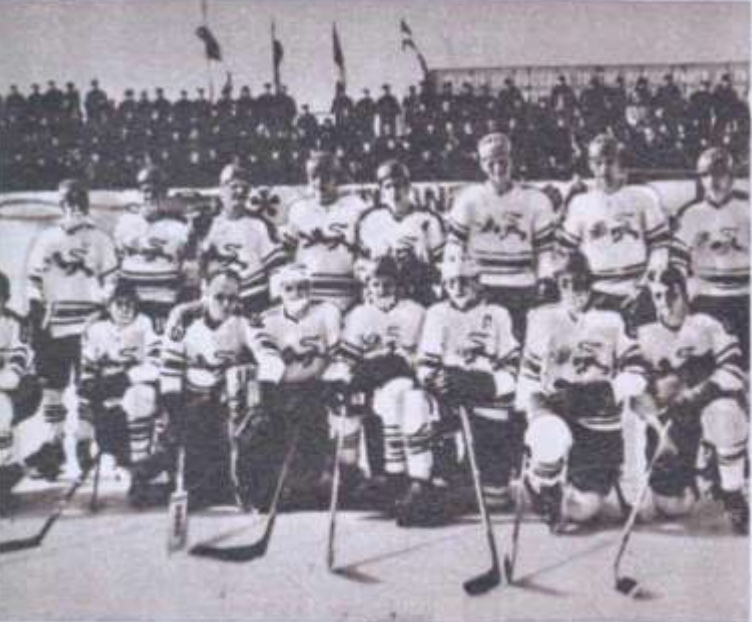
The Danish team in 1970

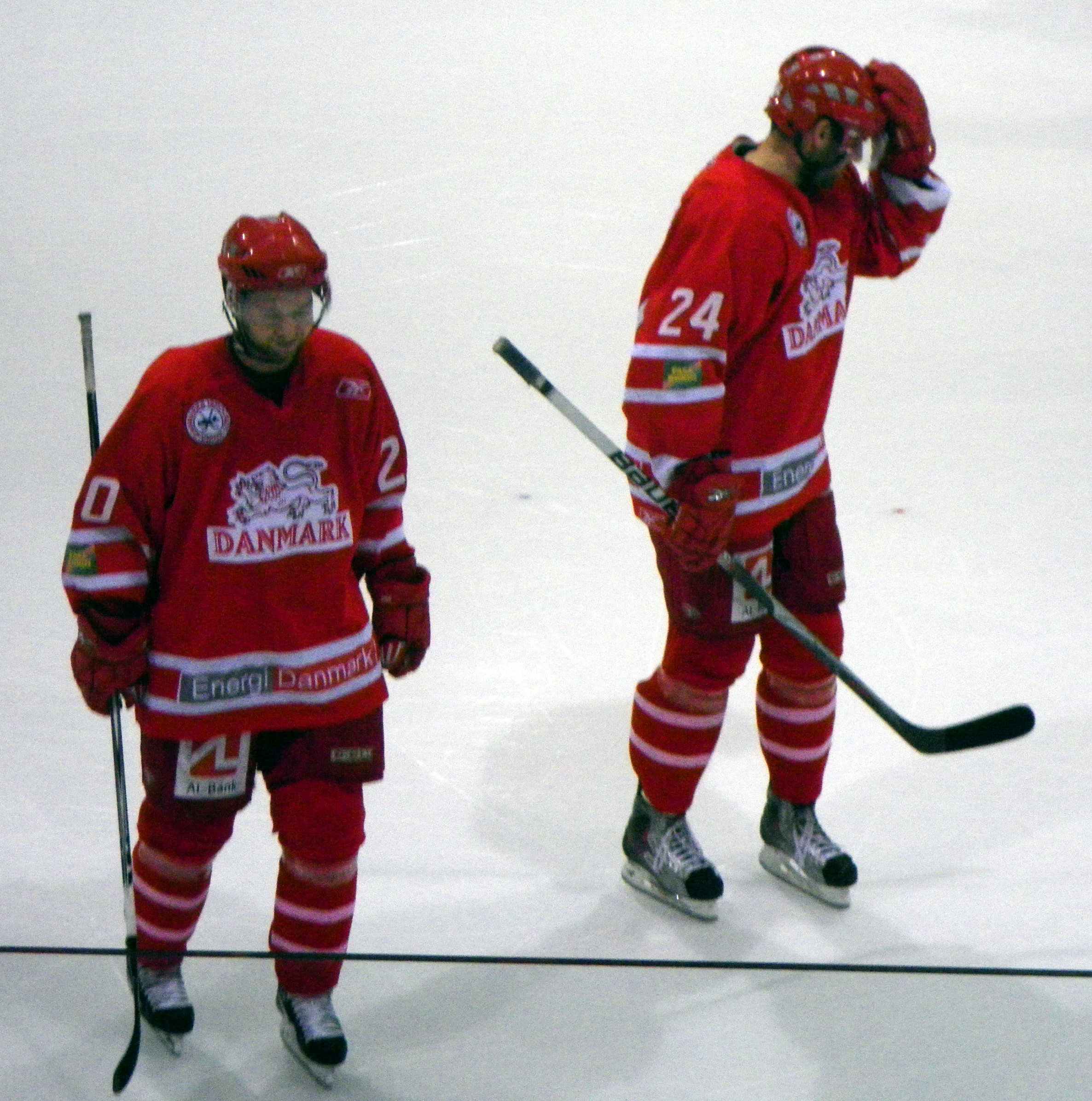
Kim Lykkeskov and Alexander Sundberg

Year	Finish	Rank
(Sweden) 1949 Stockholm	Consolation round	10th
(United States) 1962 Colorado Springs/Denver	6th in the Group B	14th
(Sweden) 1963 Stockholm	3rd in the Pool C	18th
(Socialist Federal Republic of Yugoslavia) 1966 Jesenice	2nd in the Pool C	18th
(Austria) 1967 Vienna	2nd in the Pool C	18th
(Socialist Federal Republic of Yugoslavia) 1969 Skopje	6th in the Pool C	20th
(Romania) 1970 Galaţi	5th in the Pool C	19th
(Netherlands) 1971	7th in the Pool C	21st
(Romania) 1972 Miercurea-Ciuc	6th in the Pool C	19th
(Netherlands) 1973	7th in the Pool C	21st
(Bulgaria) 1975 Sofia	6th in the Pool C	20th
(Poland) 1976 Gdańsk	3rd in the Pool C	19th
(Denmark) 1977 Copenhagen/Hørsholm	2nd in the Pool C	19th
(Spain) 1978 Canary Islands (Las Palmas)	3rd in the Pool C	19th
(Romania) 1979 Galati	Relegation in the Pool B	16th
(China) 1981 Beijing	4th in the Pool C	20th
(Spain) 1982 Jaca	3rd in the Pool C	19th
(Hungary) 1983 Budapest	4th in the Pool C	20th
(France) 1985 Megève/Chamonix/Saint-Gervais	5th in the Pool C	21st
(Spain) 1986 Puigcerda	Consolation round in the Pool C	21st
(Denmark) 1987 Copenhagen/Herlev/Hørsholm	2nd in the Pool C	18th
(Norway) 1989 Oslo/Lillehammer	8th in the Pool B	16th
(Hungary) 1990 Budapest	2nd in the Pool C	18th
(Denmark) 1991 Brøndby	1st in the Pool C	17th
(Austria) 1992 Klagenfurt	4th in the Pool B	16th
(Netherlands) 1993 Eindhoven	4th in the Pool B	16th
(Denmark) 1994 Copenhagen/Aalborg	5th in the Pool B	17th
(Slovakia) 1995 Bratislava	5th in the Pool B	17th
(Netherlands) 1996 Eindhoven	6th in the Pool B	18th
(Poland) 1997 Katowice (Spodek)/Sosnowiec	8th in the Pool B	20th
(Slovenia) 1998 Ljubljana/Jesenice	4th in the Pool B	20th
(Denmark) 1999 Odense/Rodovre	1st in the Pool B	17th
(Poland) 2000 Katowice/Krakow	5th in the Pool B	21st
(France) 2001 Grenoble	3rd in Division I, Group A	21st
(Netherlands) 2002 Eindhoven	1st in Division I, Group B	18th
(Finland) 2003 Helsinki/Tampere/Turku	Second round	11th
(Czech Republic) 2004 Prague/Ostrava	Qualifying round	12th
(Austria) 2005 Vienna/Innsbruck	Relegation round	14th
(Latvia) 2006 Riga	Relegation round	13th
(Russia) 2007 Moscow	Qualifying round	10th
(Canada) 2008 Halifax/Quebec	Qualifying round	12th
(Switzerland) 2009 Bern/Kloten	Relegation round	13th
(Germany) 2010 Cologne/Mannheim/Gelsenkirchen	Playoff round	8th
(Slovakia) 2011 Bratislava/Košice	Qualifying round	11th
(Finland) / (Sweden) 2012 Helsinki/Stockholm	Preliminary round	13th
(Sweden) / (Finland) 2013 Stockholm/Helsinki	Preliminary round	12th
(Belarus) 2014 Minsk	Preliminary round	13th
(Czech Republic) 2015 Prague/Ostrava	Preliminary round	14th
(Russia) 2016 Moscow/Saint Petersburg	Playoff round	8th
(Germany) / (France) 2017 Cologne/Paris	Preliminary round	12th
(Denmark) 2018 Copenhagen/Herning	Preliminary round	10th
(Slovakia) 2019 Bratislava/Košice	Preliminary round	11th
(Switzerland) 2020 Zurich/Lausanne	Cancelled due to the coronavirus pandemic	–
(Latvia) 2021 Riga	Preliminary round	12th
(Finland) 2022 Helsinki/Tampere	Preliminary round	9th
(Finland) / (Latvia) 2023 Tampere/Riga	Preliminary round	10th
(Czech Republic) 2024 Prague/Ostrava	Preliminary round	13th
(Sweden) / (Denmark) 2025 Stockholm/Herning	Bronze medal game	4th
(Switzerland) 2026 Zurich/Fribourg	Preliminary round	12th
(Germany) 2027 Düsseldorf/Mannheim		

== Team ==
=== Current roster ===
Roster for the 2026 IIHF World Championship.

Head coach: Mikael Gath

No.	Pos.	Name	Height	Weight	Birthdate	Team
1	G	Nicolaj Henriksen	1.95 m (6 ft 5 in)	92 kg (203 lb)	25 September 1995 (age 31)	(Denmark) Esbjerg Energy
3	D	Malte Setkov	2.00 m (6 ft 7 in)	93 kg (205 lb)	14 January 1999 (age 27)	(Denmark) Rødovre Mighty Bulls
6	F	Oliver Kjær	1.83 m (6 ft 0 in)	84 kg (185 lb)	10 July 2000 (age 26)	(Denmark) Esbjerg Energy
9	F	Frederik Storm	1.80 m (5 ft 11 in)	86 kg (190 lb)	20 February 1989 (age 37)	(Germany) Kölner Haie
11	F	Alexander True	1.96 m (6 ft 5 in)	91 kg (201 lb)	17 July 1997 (age 29)	(Finland) JYP Jyväskylä
21	D	Kasper Larsen	1.97 m (6 ft 6 in)	105 kg (231 lb)	23 September 2002 (age 24)	(Denmark) Herning Blue Fox
22	D	Markus Lauridsen	1.86 m (6 ft 1 in)	87 kg (192 lb)	28 February 1991 (age 35)	(Italy) HC Pustertal Wölfe
29	F	Mikkel Aagaard – A	1.84 m (6 ft 0 in)	81 kg (179 lb)	18 October 1995 (age 31)	(Sweden) Skellefteå AIK
30	G	Mads Søgaard	2.00 m (6 ft 7 in)	91 kg (201 lb)	13 December 2000 (age 25)	(Canada) Ottawa Senators
33	D	Morten Jensen	1.83 m (6 ft 0 in)	82 kg (181 lb)	1 March 1997 (age 29)	(Denmark) Rungsted Ishockey Klub
35	G	Kristers Steinbergs	1.92 m (6 ft 4 in)	90 kg (200 lb)	23 March 2005 (age 21)	(Sweden) Hudiksvalls HC
36	D	Daniel Baastrup	1.80 m (5 ft 11 in)	84 kg (185 lb)	23 July 1999 (age 27)	(Denmark) Odense Bulldogs
38	F	Morten Poulsen	1.86 m (6 ft 1 in)	95 kg (209 lb)	9 September 1988 (age 38)	(Denmark) Herning Blue Fox
39	F	Jacob Schmidt-Svejstrup	1.88 m (6 ft 2 in)	91 kg (201 lb)	14 January 1998 (age 28)	(Denmark) SønderjyskE Ishockey
40	D	Anders Koch	1.88 m (6 ft 2 in)	83 kg (183 lb)	2 October 1997 (age 29)	(Austria) Graz 99ers
41	D	Jesper Jensen Aabo – C	1.83 m (6 ft 0 in)	93 kg (205 lb)	30 July 1991 (age 35)	(Austria) EC KAC
42	D	Phillip Bruggisser	1.83 m (6 ft 0 in)	85 kg (187 lb)	7 August 1991 (age 35)	(Germany) Fischtown Pinguins
54	F	Felix Scheel	1.83 m (6 ft 0 in)	89 kg (196 lb)	1 September 1992 (age 34)	(Germany) Schwenninger Wild Wings
63	F	Patrick Russell – A	1.86 m (6 ft 1 in)	92 kg (203 lb)	4 January 1993 (age 33)	(Germany) Kölner Haie
65	F	Christian Wejse	1.86 m (6 ft 1 in)	88 kg (194 lb)	4 December 1998 (age 27)	(Germany) Fischtown Pinguins
72	F	Phillip Schultz	1.83 m (6 ft 0 in)	91 kg (201 lb)	24 July 2000 (age 26)	(Denmark) Esbjerg Energy
77	F	Mathias From	1.86 m (6 ft 1 in)	85 kg (187 lb)	16 December 1997 (age 28)	(Austria) EC KAC
80	G	Frederik Dichow	1.95 m (6 ft 5 in)	87 kg (192 lb)	1 March 2001 (age 25)	(Sweden) HV71
82	F	David Madsen	1.87 m (6 ft 2 in)	90 kg (200 lb)	25 January 1999 (age 27)	(Sweden) Västerås IK
86	F	Joachim Blichfeld	1.87 m (6 ft 2 in)	82 kg (181 lb)	17 July 1998 (age 28)	(Finland) Tappara
95	F	Nick Olesen	1.85 m (6 ft 1 in)	84 kg (185 lb)	14 November 1995 (age 31)	(Czech Republic) Motor České Budějovice

=== 2026 Olympics roster ===
The first six players of Denmark's roster were announced on 16 June 2025. The remaining roster was named on 7 January 2026. On 8 February, Jonas Røndbjerg was ruled out due to injury, and replaced by Malte Setkov. Jesper Jensen Aabo served as Denmark's captain, with Oliver Lauridsen and Patrick Russell as alternate captains.

Head coach: (Sweden) Mikael Gath

No.	Pos.	Name	Height	Weight	Birthdate	Team
3	D	Malte Setkov	2.03 m (6 ft 8 in)	101 kg (223 lb)	14 January 1999 (aged 27)	(Denmark) Rødovre Mighty Bulls
9	F	Frederik Storm	1.80 m (5 ft 11 in)	86 kg (190 lb)	20 February 1989 (aged 36)	(Germany) Kölner Haie
11	F	Alexander True	1.96 m (6 ft 5 in)	91 kg (201 lb)	17 July 1997 (aged 28)	(Finland) JYP
12	F	Oscar Mølgaard	1.83 m (6 ft 0 in)	80 kg (176 lb)	18 February 2005 (aged 20)	(United States) Coachella Valley Firebirds
15	D	Matias Lassen	1.83 m (6 ft 0 in)	88 kg (194 lb)	15 March 1996 (aged 29)	(Germany) Iserlohn Roosters
17	F	Nicklas Jensen	1.91 m (6 ft 3 in)	98 kg (216 lb)	6 March 1993 (aged 32)	(Switzerland) SC Rapperswil-Jona Lakers
20	F	Lars Eller	1.85 m (6 ft 1 in)	90 kg (198 lb)	8 May 1989 (aged 36)	(Canada) Ottawa Senators
22	D	Markus Lauridsen	1.85 m (6 ft 1 in)	90 kg (198 lb)	28 February 1991 (aged 34)	(Italy) HC Pustertal Wölfe
24	F	Nikolaj Ehlers	1.85 m (6 ft 1 in)	82 kg (181 lb)	14 February 1996 (aged 29)	(United States) Carolina Hurricanes
25	D	Oliver Lauridsen – A	1.98 m (6 ft 6 in)	105 kg (231 lb)	24 March 1989 (aged 36)	(Finland) TPS
27	F	Oliver Bjorkstrand	1.83 m (6 ft 0 in)	79 kg (174 lb)	10 April 1995 (aged 30)	(United States) Tampa Bay Lightning
29	F	Mikkel Aagaard	1.83 m (6 ft 0 in)	86 kg (190 lb)	18 October 1995 (aged 30)	(Sweden) Skellefteå AIK
30	G	Mads Søgaard	2.01 m (6 ft 7 in)	91 kg (201 lb)	13 December 2000 (aged 25)	(Canada) Belleville Senators
31	G	Frederik Andersen	1.93 m (6 ft 4 in)	100 kg (220 lb)	2 October 1989 (aged 36)	(United States) Carolina Hurricanes
38	F	Morten Poulsen	1.85 m (6 ft 1 in)	101 kg (223 lb)	9 September 1988 (aged 37)	(Denmark) Herning Blue Fox
40	D	Anders Koch	1.91 m (6 ft 3 in)	86 kg (190 lb)	2 October 1997 (aged 28)	(Austria) Graz99ers
41	D	Jesper Jensen Aabo – C	1.83 m (6 ft 0 in)	87 kg (192 lb)	30 July 1991 (aged 34)	(Austria) EC KAC
42	D	Phillip Bruggisser	1.83 m (6 ft 0 in)	91 kg (201 lb)	7 August 1991 (aged 34)	(Germany) Fischtown Pinguins
48	D	Nicholas B. Jensen	1.88 m (6 ft 2 in)	102 kg (225 lb)	8 April 1989 (aged 36)	(Germany) Fischtown Pinguins
50	F	Mathias Bau	2.01 m (6 ft 7 in)	108 kg (238 lb)	3 July 1993 (aged 32)	(Denmark) Herning Blue Fox
63	F	Patrick Russell – A	1.85 m (6 ft 1 in)	92 kg (203 lb)	4 January 1993 (aged 33)	(Germany) Kölner Haie
65	F	Christian Wejse	1.85 m (6 ft 1 in)	88 kg (194 lb)	4 December 1998 (aged 27)	(Germany) Fischtown Pinguins
80	G	Frederik Dichow	1.96 m (6 ft 5 in)	94 kg (207 lb)	1 March 2001 (aged 24)	(Sweden) HV71
86	F	Joachim Blichfeld	1.88 m (6 ft 2 in)	92 kg (203 lb)	17 July 1998 (aged 27)	(Finland) Tappara
95	F	Nick Olesen	1.85 m (6 ft 1 in)	84 kg (185 lb)	14 November 1995 (aged 30)	(Czech Republic) Motor České Budějovice

=== Former and current players in NHL ===
Year	Name	Position	Team
1965–1966; 1967–1968; 1968–1970; 1970–1972; 1979–1980	Poul Popiel (Note: Poul Popiel is Danish-American. He was born in Denmark and his family moved to Canada when he was a child. He subsequently moved to the United States, and he acquired American citizenship before making his NHL debut.)	Defenseman	Boston Bruins; Los Angeles Kings; Detroit Red Wings; Vancouver Canucks; Edmonton Oilers
2006–2016; 2016–2021	Frans Nielsen	Center	New York Islanders; Detroit Red Wings
2007–2017; 2017–2018	Jannik Hansen	Right winger	Vancouver Canucks; San Jose Sharks
2009–2013; 2013–2014; 2014	Peter Regin	Center	Ottawa Senators; New York Islanders; Chicago Blackhawks
2008–2016; 2016; 2016–2018; 2018–2020	Mikkel Bødker	Left winger	Arizona Coyotes; Colorado Avalanche; San Jose Sharks; Ottawa Senators
2009–2010; 2010–2016; 2016–2023; 2023–2024; 2024–2025; 2025-2026; 2026-	Lars Eller	Center	St. Louis Blues; Montreal Canadiens; Washington Capitals; Pittsburgh Penguins; Washington Capitals; Ottawa Senators; Florida Panthers
2010–2013; 2013–2014; 2016–2017	Philip Larsen	Defenseman	Dallas Stars; Edmonton Oilers; Vancouver Canucks
2013–2014; 2016	Nicklas Jensen	Left winger	Vancouver Canucks; New York Rangers
2013	Oliver Lauridsen	Defenseman	Philadelphia Flyers
2013–2016; 2016–2021; 2021–2026; 2026-	Frederik Andersen	Goaltender	Anaheim Ducks; Toronto Maple Leafs; Carolina Hurricanes; Edmonton Oilers
2015–2025; 2025-	Nikolaj Ehlers	Left winger	Winnipeg Jets; Carolina Hurricanes
2016–2022; 2022–2025; 2025–2026; 2026-	Oliver Bjorkstrand	Right winger	Columbus Blue Jackets; Seattle Kraken; Tampa Bay Lightning; New York Rangers
2018–2021	Patrick Russell	Right winger	Edmonton Oilers
2019–2021	Joachim Blichfeld	Right winger	San Jose Sharks
2020–2021; 2021–2022	Alexander True	Center	San Jose Sharks; Seattle Kraken
2021–	Jonas Røndbjerg	Forward	Vegas Golden Knights
2022–2026; 2026-	Mads Søgaard	Goaltender	Ottawa Senators; Tampa Bay Lightning
2025–	Oscar Fisker Mølgaard	Forward	Seattle Kraken

== All-time record ==
Updated as of the match versus Norway on 8 November 2025.

Team	GP	W	T	L	GF	GA
Australia	2	1	0	1	10	7
Austria	44	13	1	30	95	175
Belarus	29	13	2	14	72	90
Belgium	13	12	0	1	177	31
Bulgaria	32	19	2	11	137	88
Canada	11	2	1	8	15	85
China	16	8	2	6	86	52
Croatia	3	3	0	0	24	4
Czech Republic	13	3	0	10	18	47
East Germany	12	0	0	12	25	84
Estonia	7	4	2	1	26	16
Finland	28	4	0	24	31	111
France	86	37	5	44	243	294
Germany	30	11	0	19	67	90
Great Britain	30	17	4	9	139	93
Hungary	67	29	4	34	228	286
Italy	30	14	3	13	96	118
Japan	34	14	1	19	112	147
Kazakhstan	10	6	0	4	38	25
Latvia	38	14	0	24	93	131
Lithuania	1	1	0	0	8	1
Netherlands	55	31	7	17	242	185
North Korea	7	7	0	0	52	12
Norway	104	44	9	51	263	330
Poland	32	11	3	18	102	134
Romania	20	9	1	10	75	80
Russia	15	1	0	14	17	68
Slovakia	24	7	0	17	50	93
Slovenia	30	16	3	11	97	78
South Africa	2	2	0	0	15	2
South Korea	10	9	0	1	86	16
Spain	6	6	0	0	42	8
Sweden	28	2	0	26	44	132
Switzerland	33	3	1	29	51	147
Ukraine	11	3	3	5	29	30
United States	12	2	0	10	16	46
Yugoslavia	20	8	4	8	73	78
Totals:	946	386	58	501	2 997	3 414

== Uniform evolution ==
National team jerseys

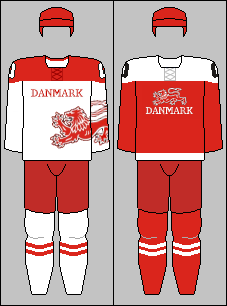
2013–2017 IIHF jerseys

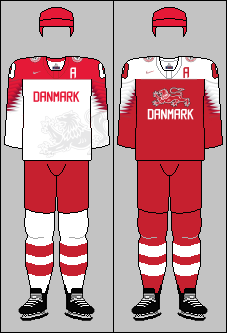
2018–2021 IIHF jerseys

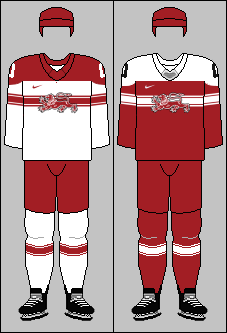
2022 Olympic jerseys

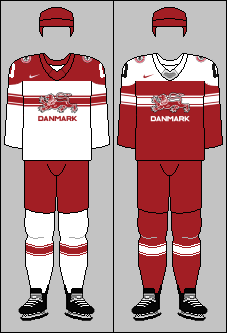
2022– IIHF jerseys
