= Philip Larsen =

Danish ice hockey player (born 1989)

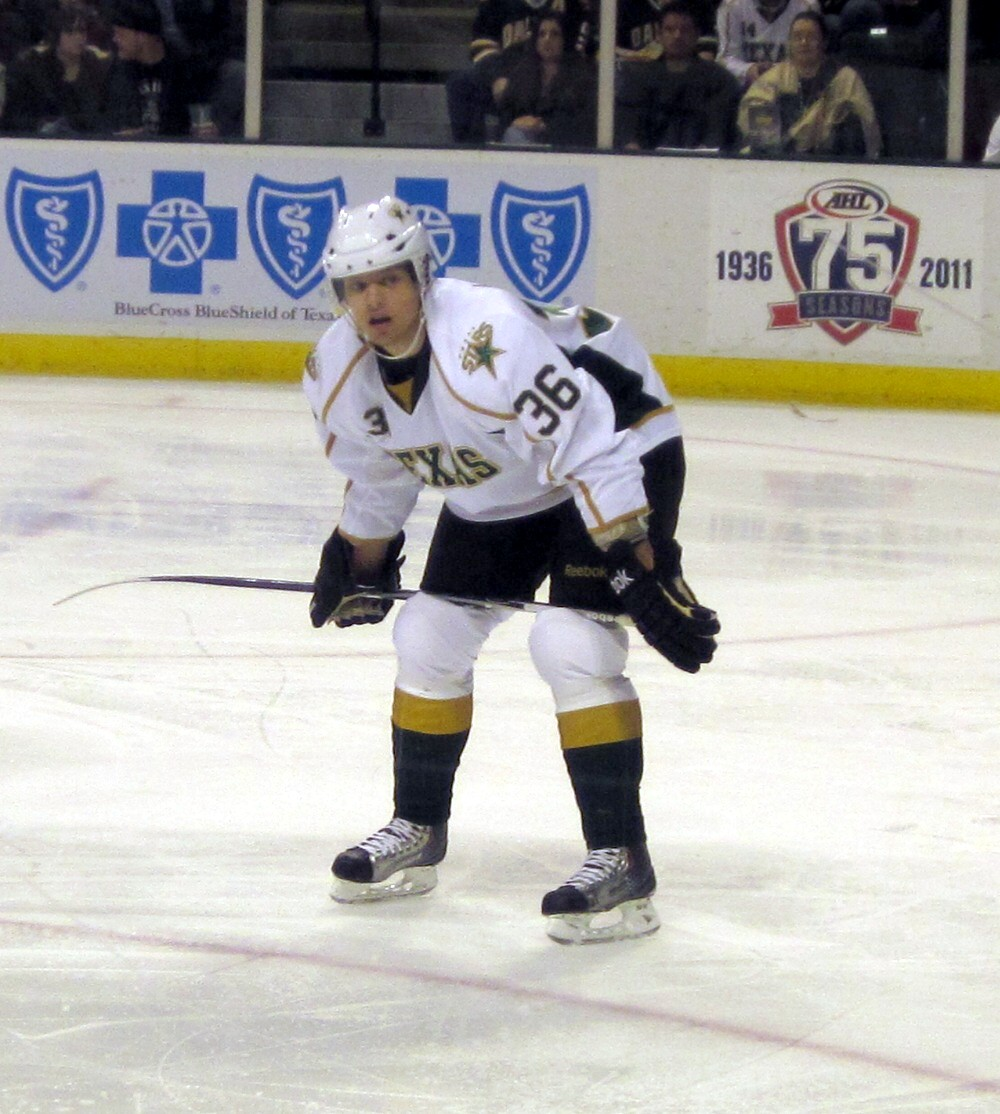
- Born: 7 December 1989 (age 36) Esbjerg, Denmark
- Height: 6 ft 0 in (183 cm)
- Weight: 190 lb (86 kg; 13 st 8 lb)
- Position: Defence
- Shoots: Right
- Metal team Former teams: Esbjerg Energy; Frölunda HC; Dallas Stars; Lukko; Edmonton Oilers; HC Yugra; Jokerit; Vancouver Canucks; Salavat Yulaev Ufa
- National team: Denmark
- NHL draft: 149th overall, 2008; Dallas Stars
- Playing career: 2005–present

Philip Elzer Gade Larsen (born 7 December 1989) is a Danish professional ice hockey defenceman. He is currently playing with Esbjerg Energy of the Metal Ligaen (DEN). He was originally drafted 149th overall by the Dallas Stars in the 2008 NHL entry draft.

== Playing career ==
Larsen came to Rögle BK's junior team at age 15. On 9 October 2005, Larsen made his senior hockey debut for Rögle in a 3–0 win over Nybro Vikings. For the 2006–07 season Larsen was acquired by Frölunda HC. On 24 February 2007, Larsen made his Elitserien debut for Frölunda in an 8–2 win against HV71. On 20 April 2009, following his season at Frölunda, Larsen was recalled to the NHL club that drafted him, the Dallas Stars, who then signed him to a three-year entry-level contract.

On 21 January 2012, he scored his first NHL goal against Josh Harding of the Minnesota Wild in a 5–2 defeat.

With the 2012–13 season delayed due to the Lockout, Larsen signed a contract for the duration of the dispute with Lukko of the Finnish SM-liiga on 27 September 2012.

After completion of the lockout-shortened 2012–13 season, on 4 July 2013, Larsen was traded, along with a draft pick, by the Stars to the Edmonton Oilers in exchange for Shawn Horcoff.

On 28 May 2014, HC Yugra of the KHL signed Larsen to a one-year contract. Larsen enjoyed a successful debut season in the KHL in 2014–15, contributing with 6 goals and 25 points in 56 games as Yugra missed the post-season.

On 25 May 2015, Larsen signed a one-year contract to remain in the KHL, moving to Finnish participant Jokerit. While in the playoffs with Jokerit having recorded 36 points in 52 regular season games, on 24 February 2016, Larsen's NHL rights were traded by the Edmonton Oilers to the Vancouver Canucks in exchange for a conditional 5th round pick in the 2017 draft.

On 1 July 2016 Larsen signed a one-year, one-way deal by the Vancouver Canucks. Limited to 26 games with the Canucks due to injury and form, Larsen struggled to make an impact in his return to the NHL in 2016–17, registering 1 goal and 6 points.

As an impending free agent from the Canucks, Larsen opted to return to the KHL after his rights were traded by Jokerit, agreeing to a two-year contract with Russian club, Salavat Yulaev Ufa on 20 April 2017.

After the 2022 Russian invasion of Ukraine, he elected to leave the team.

== International play ==
At international level, Larsen has represented Denmark at the 2008 World Junior Ice Hockey Championships, and at the 2009, 2010, 2012, 2013, and 2014 IIHF World Championships with the Denmark men's national ice hockey team.

== Career statistics ==
=== Regular season and playoffs ===
			Regular season					Playoffs
Season	Team	League	GP	G	A	Pts	PIM	GP	G	A	Pts	PIM
2004–05	Esbjerg fB Ishockey	DNK U20	10	0	1	1	2	—	—	—	—	—
2005–06	Rögle BK	J20	32	1	4	5	24	—	—	—	—	—
2005–06	Rögle BK	Allsv	13	0	0	0	0	—	—	—	—	—
2006–07	Frölunda HC	J18 Allsv	2	1	1	2	2	4	2	1	3	8
2006–07	Frölunda HC	J20	37	3	15	18	50	8	0	1	1	6
2006–07	Frölunda HC	SEL	5	0	0	0	0	—	—	—	—	—
2007–08	Frölunda HC	J20	8	1	4	5	12	7	0	4	4	6
2007–08	Frölunda HC	SEL	16	0	0	0	2	—	—	—	—	—
2007–08	Borås HC	Allsv	24	5	5	10	32	—	—	—	—	—
2008–09	Frölunda HC	J20	1	1	0	1	0	—	—	—	—	—
2008–09	Frölunda HC	SEL	53	2	15	17	18	11	2	1	3	4
2009–10	Frölunda HC	SEL	42	1	9	10	20	7	0	0	0	4
2009–10	Dallas Stars	NHL	2	0	1	1	0	—	—	—	—	—
2010–11	Dallas Stars	NHL	6	0	2	2	0	—	—	—	—	—
2010–11	Texas Stars	AHL	54	4	18	22	12	6	2	3	5	4
2011–12	Texas Stars	AHL	12	1	9	10	6	—	—	—	—	—
2011–12	Dallas Stars	NHL	55	3	8	11	16	—	—	—	—	—
2012–13	Lukko	SM-l	27	5	10	15	24	—	—	—	—	—
2012–13	Dallas Stars	NHL	32	2	3	5	18	—	—	—	—	—
2013–14	Oklahoma City Barons	AHL	7	1	6	7	4	—	—	—	—	—
2013–14	Edmonton Oilers	NHL	30	3	9	12	8	—	—	—	—	—
2014–15	HC Yugra	KHL	56	6	19	25	34	—	—	—	—	—
2015–16	Jokerit	KHL	52	11	25	36	39	4	3	1	4	0
2016–17	Vancouver Canucks	NHL	26	1	5	6	4	—	—	—	—	—
2017–18	Salavat Yulaev Ufa	KHL	52	11	27	38	16	13	2	4	6	2
2018–19	Salavat Yulaev Ufa	KHL	55	9	17	26	14	15	1	5	6	2
2019–20	Salavat Yulaev Ufa	KHL	61	9	23	32	12	6	1	3	4	0
2020–21	Salavat Yulaev Ufa	KHL	47	10	25	35	8	9	0	2	2	0
2021–22	Salavat Yulaev Ufa	KHL	36	4	13	17	12	1	0	0	0	2
SEL totals			116	3	24	27	40	18	2	1	3	8
NHL totals			151	9	28	37	46	—	—	—	—	—
KHL totals			361	60	149	209	135	48	7	15	22	6

=== International ===
Year	Team	Event	Result	GP	G	A	Pts	PIM
2006	Denmark	WJC D1	14th	5	0	1	1	4
2006	Denmark	WJC18 D1	13th	5	3	3	6	12
2007	Denmark	WJC D1	11th	5	0	2	2	6
2008	Denmark	WJC	10th	6	1	1	2	6
2009	Denmark	WJC D1	14th	5	0	4	4	2
2009	Denmark	OGQ	DNQ	3	0	1	1	0
2009	Denmark	WC	13th	6	0	0	0	8
2010	Denmark	WC	8th	7	2	0	2	4
2012	Denmark	WC	13th	7	0	2	2	2
2013	Denmark	WC	12th	6	1	1	2	4
2014	Denmark	WC	13th	7	0	1	1	4
2016	Denmark	OGQ	DNQ	3	1	1	2	0
2018	Denmark	WC	10th	7	0	3	3	0
2021	Denmark	OGQ	Q	3	0	1	1	0
Junior totals				26	4	11	15	30
Senior totals				49	4	10	14	22
