= Lars Eller =

Danish ice hockey player (born 1989)

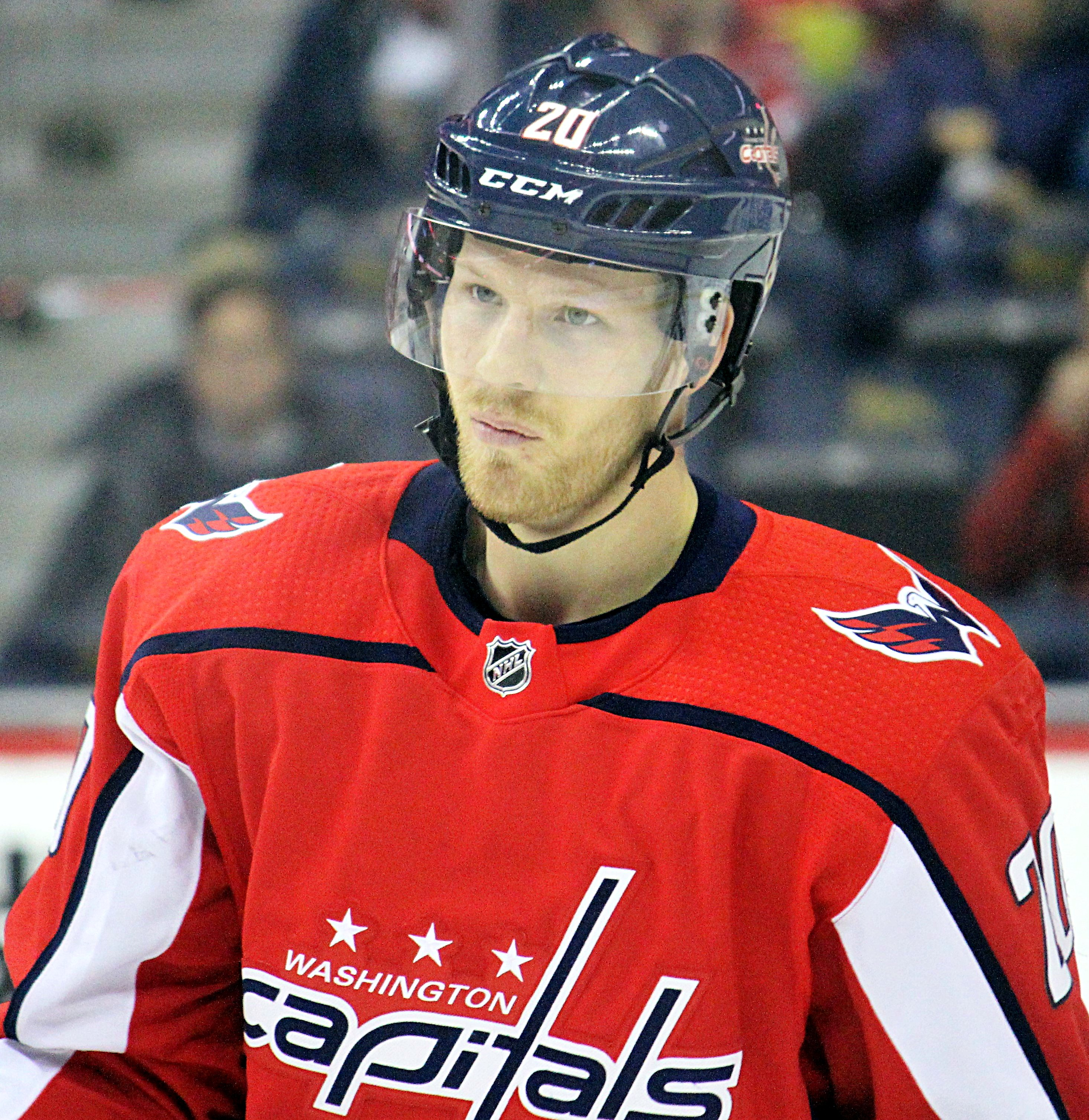
- Eller with the Washington Capitals in February 2018
- Born: 8 May 1989 (age 37) Rødovre, Denmark
- Height: 6 ft 2 in (188 cm)
- Weight: 198 lb (90 kg; 14 st 2 lb)
- Position: Centre
- Shoots: Left
- NHL team Former teams: Florida Panthers; Frölunda HC; St. Louis Blues; Montreal Canadiens; JYP; Washington Capitals; Colorado Avalanche; Pittsburgh Penguins; Ottawa Senators
- National team: Denmark
- NHL draft: 13th overall, 2007; St. Louis Blues
- Playing career: 2007–present

Lars Fosgaard Eller (born 8 May 1989) is a Danish professional ice hockey player who is a centre for the Florida Panthers of the National Hockey League (NHL). Nicknamed "the Tiger", he was drafted by the St. Louis Blues in the first round, 13th overall, in the 2007 NHL entry draft. Eller made his NHL debut in 2009 with the Blues and was traded to the Montreal Canadiens in 2010, where he played six seasons, before being traded to the Washington Capitals in 2016. He became the first person from Denmark to win the Stanley Cup when the Capitals won in 2018, scoring the Stanley Cup-winning goal. After a brief stint with the Colorado Avalanche, Eller joined the Pittsburgh Penguins in 2023, becoming the first Danish player to play in 1,000 NHL games, before being traded back to the Capitals in 2024. Internationally, Eller has played for the Danish national team at both the junior and senior level, including at five World Championships.

== Playing career ==
=== St. Louis Blues (2009–2010) ===
During the 2007 NHL entry draft, Eller was selected 13th overall by the St. Louis Blues, the highest ranking for a Danish born and trained player in NHL history until friend and former teammate Mikkel Bødker was selected number eight overall by the Arizona Coyotes in the 2008 NHL entry draft. (Danish-born Jan Popiel was drafted tenth overall in the 1964 NHL amateur draft but grew up in and became a citizen of Canada before making his pro debut.)

Eller spent part of the 2007–08 season with Borås in the HockeyAllsvenskan, on loan from Frölunda.

Eller moved to North America for the 2009–10 season. His preseason was spoiled by mononucleosis and, as a result, he started the season playing for the Peoria Rivermen in the American Hockey League (AHL). He was called up by the St. Louis and made his NHL debut on 5 November 2009 in a game against the Calgary Flames in which the Blues lost 2–1. He scored the Blues' lone goal, beating Miikka Kiprusoff off of a deflection and had three shots on goal in 9:42 minutes of ice time. Eller appeared in five NHL games before returning to Peoria, finishing the season with seven games for the Blues.

With the Rivermen, Eller was named AHL Rookie of the Month for March 2010 and was also selected for the 2009–10 AHL All-Rookie Team.

=== Montreal Canadiens (2010–2016) ===
On 17 June 2010, Eller was traded by the Blues to the Montreal Canadiens, along with Ian Schultz, in exchange for goaltender Jaroslav Halák. He participated in the Canadiens pre-season games where he played both a center and winger role. As the 2010–11 season approached, Eller was assigned to the Canadiens top line alongside Tomáš Plekanec and Michael Cammalleri. Once the season began, Eller was assigned to a winger position but was held pointless through the first five games of the season. His drought continued as he remained goalless through his first 20 games before scoring his first as a Canadien against the Los Angeles Kings on 24 November. Eller was a healthy scratch for three games in mid-January before rejoining the lineup on 18 January to play alongside Plekanec and Andrei Kostitsyn. Upon re-joining the lineup, Eller surpassed his previous career-high of ice time by playing 16:53 minutes in a game against the Buffalo Sabres. In late February, Eller found chemistry alongside Travis Moen and Kostitsyn and the three carried a five-game, seven-point streak by 4 March. As the Canadiens faced off against the Boston Bruins in the first round of the 2011 Stanley Cup playoffs, Eller was given the responsibility of shutting down the Bruins’ top line. He finished third on the team with 18 hits during the postseason while also playing through a dislocated shoulder.

During the off-season, Eller underwent shoulder surgery but rejoined the team for their 2011–12 season home opener. He joined the team for their home opener on 13 October 2011 against the Calgary Flames where he played 10:57 minutes of ice time. He was reunited with his former linemates Andrei Kostitsyn and Travis Moen and the three combined for 10 points in the first five games. On 23 November, Eller tallied his first shorthanded NHL goal in a win over the Carolina Hurricanes. In December, he sat as a healthy scratch for one game before returning to the lineup centering Erik Cole and Max Pacioretty. He also received a $2,500 fine for boarding Los Angeles Kings defenceman Drew Doughty during a game. On 4 January 2012, Eller scored four goals and an assist in a 7–3 victory against the Winnipeg Jets, his first career hat-trick. He subsequently became the first Montreal Canadien to score four goals at home in a single game since 27 February 1993. He continued to improve from his rookie season with the Canadiens and surpassed his 2010–11 season total in only 43 games. He finished his second season with the Canadiens with career-highs in games played, goals, assists, and points. As such, he signed a two-year contract to remain with the Canadiens through the 2012–13 and 2013–14 seasons. Once the Canadiens 2011–12 season ended, Eller returned to his home country to conduct his off-season training.

During the 2012–13 2012–13 NHL lockout, Eller signed a temporary contract with JYP Jyväskylä in the Finnish elite hockey league Liiga. While with JYP, Eller played alongside Boston Bruins forward Rich Peverley and ex-NHLers Éric Perrin and Ramzi Abid. He recorded five goals and 10 assists through 15 games before returning to the Canadiens in January 2013. Upon re-joining the team, Eller bounced between different lines before centering Colby Armstrong and Moen. He also earned a spot on the penalty kill as a replacement for an ill Max Pacioretty where he tallied a goal and two assists while going 63% in the faceoff circle during a 6–1 win over the Sabres in early February. Later that month, Eller was paired alongside Alex Galchenyuk and Erik Cole and they immediately made an impact on the team. By April 2013, Eller had accumulated four goals and 19 points through 35 games. During the 2013 Stanley Cup playoffs, Eller was knocked unconscious following an open ice check by Ottawa Senators' defenceman Eric Gryba. He was stretchered off the ice and was later diagnosed with a concussion, along with dental and facial fractures.

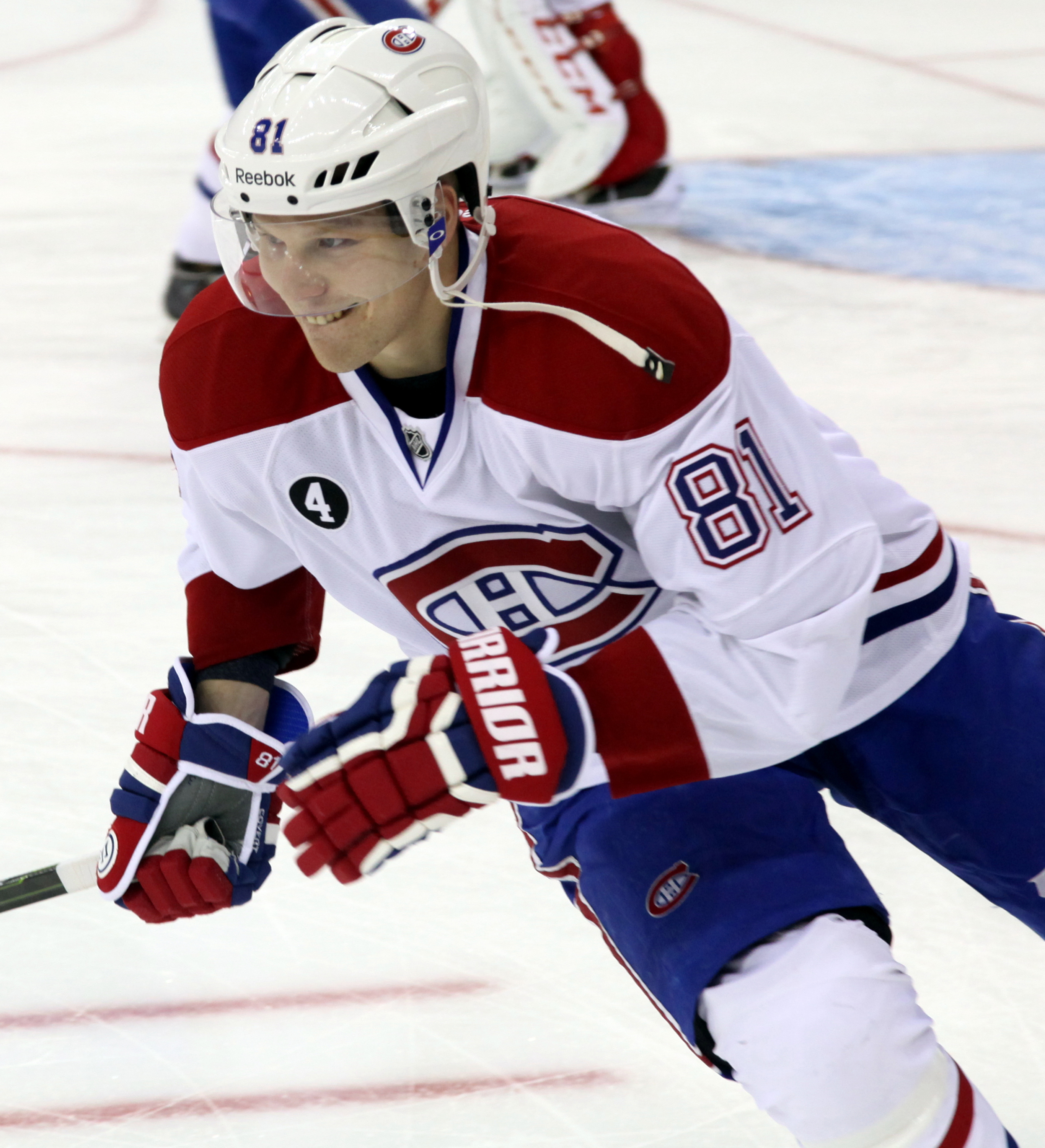
Eller with the Montreal Canadiens in January 2015

Eller recovered from the injury during the off-season and returned to the Montreal Canadiens lineup to begin the 2013–14 season. During the off-season, Eller and his agent were in talks with the Canadiens organization on a contract extension but eventually decided to see his play during the 2013–14 season. Once the season began, Eller was named the Second Star of the Week for the week ending on 6 October. He received this honor after factoring in on five of Montreal's seven goals and becoming the third Canadiens player since 2002–03 to register three or more points in the team's season opener. Eller also started the 2013–14 season shooting over 42% in his first five games before seeing his conversion rate fall toward his career average of 11.3%. In mid-October, Eller was transitioned from winger to center and he centered the "Kid Line" between Alex Galchenyuk and Brendan Gallagher. While on this line, Eller tallied nine points in 13 games during the month of October and led the team in goals during the early stages of the season. Due to this, he surpassed his goal tally from the previous season in five less games by scoring his 9th of the season in a game against the Carolina Hurricanes on 31 December. Eller finished the regular season with 12 goals and 14 assists including two goals on the power play, one while shorthanded and scored three game-winning goals. He also led all Canadiens forwards with 130 hits and recorded 137 shots on goal, while averaging 15:57 of ice time per game.

As the Canadiens qualified for the 2014 Stanley Cup playoffs, Eller continued to produce and set career-highs in games played, goals, assists, and points. During the first round of the playoffs, Eller amassed at least a point per game and finished with six points in five playoff games against the Tampa Bay Lightning. During game one of the second round against the Boston Bruins, Eller scored the first goal of the series to help lead the Canadiens to a win. They eventually fell to the New York Rangers in game six of the Eastern Conference finals. On 24 July 2014, Eller signed a four-year, $13 million contract extension with the Canadiens.

Following the signing of his contract extension, Eller spent six weeks in his hometown of Copenhagen before returning to Montreal to resume his daily workouts at the Bell Sports Complex. Once the 2014–15 season began, Eller centered Jiří Sekáč and Brandon Prust through the first half of the season but when his production began to wane, his name was flown around to be traded. However, he remained with the team and played with Devante Smith-Pelly and Jacob de la Rose over the final six games of the season. While with his new linemates, Eller snapped a 14-game goalless streak on 7 March and combined for numerous shots on net and hits.

=== Washington Capitals (2016–2023) ===
After six seasons, Eller's tenure with the Canadiens came to an end at the 2016 NHL entry draft, as he was traded to the Washington Capitals in exchange for two second-round picks in 2017 and 2018 on 24 June 2016. Upon joining the Capitals for the 2016–17 season, Eller centred their third line alongside André Burakovsky and Tom Wilson for their opening night matchup. As the season continued, the Capitals forward lines were constantly being switched up and Eller rarely had the same linemates for more than a few games. He scored two goals in his first 17 games with the Capitals before suffering an upper-body injury during a game against the Detroit Red Wings on 19 November. He returned to the Capitals lineup on 24 November for a game against the St. Louis Blues after missing one game. Through December and January, Eller was matched with Brett Connolly and Burakovsky and the three had combined for 18 goals through 14 games. They also helped the Capitals maintain a four-game winning streak by totaling six goals and 11 points as a line. However, their success was short-lived as Burakovsky suffered an injury to his right hand in mid-February and Eller was reunited with Zach Sanford. In his first year with the Capitals, Eller helped the team qualify for the 2017 playoffs and clinch a second consecutive Presidents' Trophy. During game three of first-round series against the Maple Leafs, Eller took a penalty leading to the Maple Leafs winning in overtime. However, the Capitals recovered and beat the eighth-seeded Maple Leafs in six games to face the second-seeded Pittsburgh Penguins in the second round. As the Capitals began trailing the Penguins, Eller gained new line mates in captain Alexander Ovechkin and Tom Wilson during game six. Once the Capitals were eliminated from the playoffs, Eller had accumulated three assists in seven games. Following their early elimination, the Capitals released their protection list prior to the 2017 NHL expansion draft which included Eller.

Eller returned to the Capitals for the 2017–18 season for the final year of his contract prior to becoming an unrestricted free agent. On 10 February 2018, Eller signed a five-year, $17.5 million contract extension with the Capitals. At the time of the signing, he had recorded 11 goals and 28 points through 53 games. He finished the season with 18 goals and 20 assists for 38 points in 81 games as the Capitals finished as the second-seed in the East. On 7 June, Eller won his first Stanley Cup when the Capitals defeated the first-year Vegas Golden Knights in five games. Eller scored the Cup-clinching goal, and finished the playoffs with seven goals and 11 assists for 18 points in all 24 games. He became the first NHL player born in Denmark to win a Stanley Cup and became the first player to bring the Cup to Denmark. It would be eight further years before another Danish-born player won a Stanley Cup. (Note: Nikolaj Ehlers and Frederik Andersen were together the second and third Danish players to win a Stanley Cup title, both winning with the Carolina Hurricanes in the 2026 Stanley Cup Final)

Following their Stanley Cup win, Eller returned to the Capitals lineup and took up more responsibility on the ice. On 3 October, in the 2018–19 season opener in a 7–0 win over the Boston Bruins, Eller mocked the Boston Bruins' bench after scoring a goal, which provoked a much discussed fight in which he was beaten and bloodied by the smaller Bruins forward Brad Marchand. It was the first fight of Eller's career. On 19 October, Eller recorded three assists in a 6–5 win over the Florida Panthers to set a single-game personal best for his NHL career. He continued to produce offensively through late October and early November and he combined with Brett Connolly for nine points over that span. As a result of numerous injuries to the Capitals in November, Eller earned more playing time while centering the top line alongside Ovechkin and Tom Wilson. As the Capitals experienced a four-game losing streak to start the month of January, Eller was moved up from the third line to center the second line between Jakub Vrána and Tom Wilson. The team broke their losing streak at seven games with a 4–3 win over Calgary Flames on 1 February 2019 but Eller left the game early due to a lower-body injury. As such, he missed his first game of the season before rejoining the lineup for a 3–2 win over the Vancouver Canucks. Once Carl Hagelin joined the Capitals lineup in March, Eller was teamed up with him for his first game and tallied an assist on his first Capitals goal. The assist was his 22nd on the season, matching his single-season best. He subsequently helped the Capitals clinch their fourth straight Metropolitan Division title and helped them prepare for a long playoff berth. After the Capitals were eliminated by the Carolina Hurricanes in the first round, Eller joined Denmark at the 2019 IIHF World Championship.

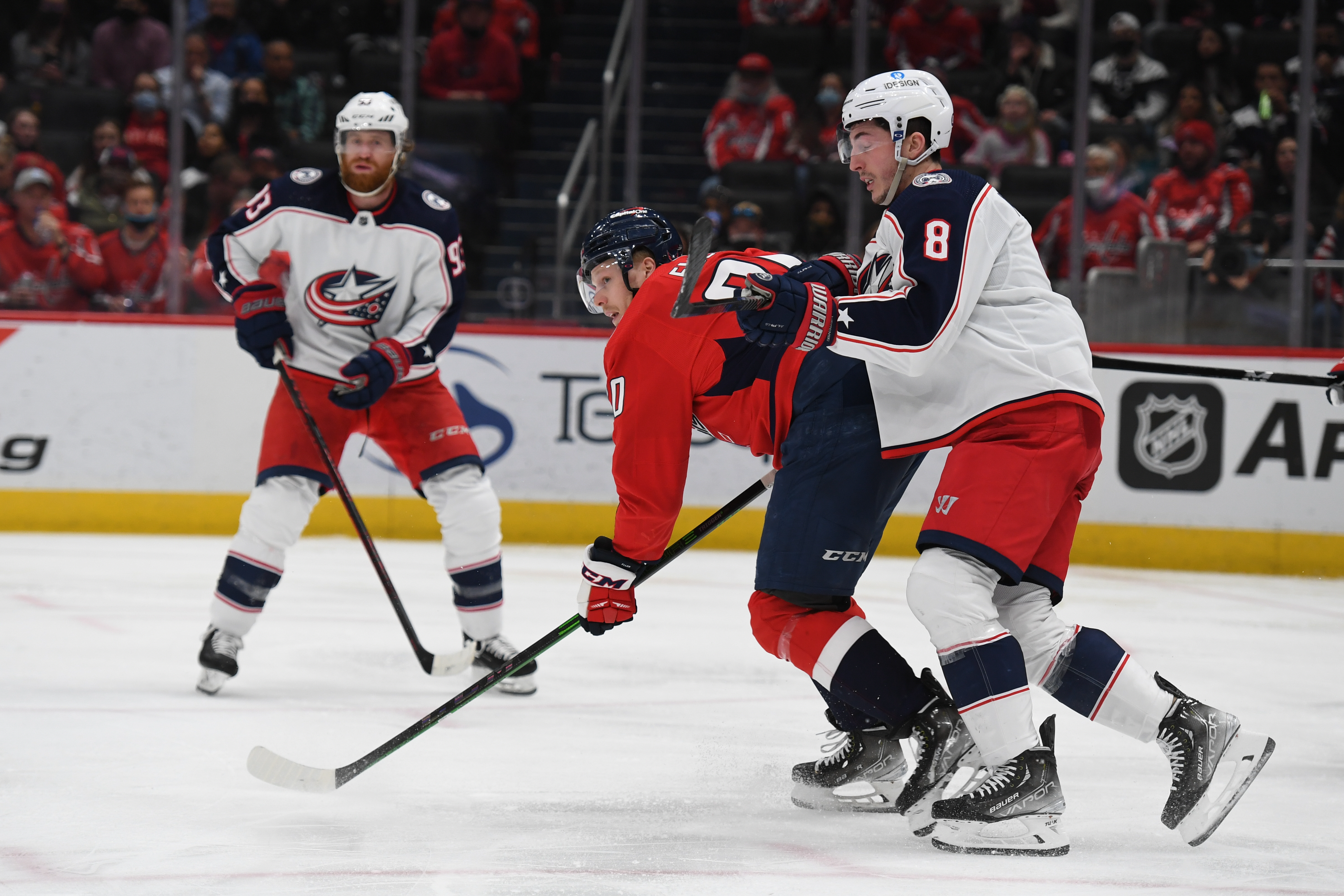
Eller (middle) battling against Jakub Voráček and Zack Werenski in February 2022

In the shortened 2019–20 season, Eller recorded a career-high 39 points while matching his previous best in assists with 23. Despite his overall success, Eller's season began slowly as he was scratched from a preseason game due to a lower-body injury. He returned the following game and stepped up to fill in for Evgeny Kuznetsov in a top-six role on a line with Jakub Vrána and T. J. Oshie. He began the season on this line and tallied three assists before Kuznetsov returned on 7 October 2019. Eller was paired with Richard Pánik until his trade in February for Ilya Kovalchuk who quickly became his linemate. They led the Capitals to consecutive mid-January home games over Carolina and New Jersey by taking on greater defensive responsibilities. As a result, for his defensive focus, their line combined for just 18 goals through the first 80 percent of the season. Once the NHL was resumed play following a pause due to the COVID-19 pandemic, Eller joined the Capitals for the 2020 Stanley Cup playoffs qualifiers against the Tampa Bay Lightning.

=== Colorado Avalanche (2023) ===
On 1 March 2023, the Capitals traded Eller to the Colorado Avalanche in exchange for a second-round pick in the 2025 NHL entry draft. With the Capitals in the midst of a West Coast road trip, Eller immediately made his debut with the Avalanche that night at Ball Arena in Denver, playing in a third-line center role in a 7–5 loss to the New Jersey Devils. He completed the regular season in posting three goals and four assists for seven points through 24 appearances. He was scoreless in the postseason as the Avalanche lost a seven-game first-round series against the Seattle Kraken.

=== Pittsburgh Penguins (2023–2024) ===
Eller became a free agent at the end of his contract with the Avalanche, and then signed a two-year, $4.9 million contract with the Pittsburgh Penguins on 1 July 2023. On 27 January 2024, Eller played his 1,000th NHL game, becoming the first Danish player to do so.

=== Return to Washington (2024–2025) ===
On 12 November 2024, one night after a 7–1 loss to the Dallas Stars, the Penguins traded Eller back to the Capitals in exchange for a 2025 fifth-round pick and a 2027 third-round pick.

=== Ottawa Senators (2025–2026) ===
Eller, having concluded his second tenure with the Capitals, opted to continue his career in the NHL by signing a one-year, $1.25 million contract with the Ottawa Senators for the 2025–26 season on 1 July 2025. In January 2026, Eller was named to Denmark men's olympic team for the 2026 Winter Olympics in Milan and Cortina d'Ampezzo.

=== Florida Panthers (2026–) ===
Eller left the Senators as a free agent at the conclusion of his contract and opted to return for an 18th NHL season in 2026–27 by agreeing to a one-year, $850,000 contract with the Florida Panthers on 1 July 2026.

== Personal life ==
Lars Eller grew up in Rødovre, Denmark. His father, Olaf Eller, is a former Danish international ice hockey player and former coach of several teams in the Superisligaen, as well as Troja/Ljungby in Sweden. Olaf Eller is also a color commentator for Danish TV 2 Sport for the IIHF World Championships and occasionally for games in the AL-Bank Ligaen. He is also head coach of Esbjerg IK. His younger brother Mads (born 25 June 1995) played one season for the Adirondack Thunder of the ECHL, and had also played junior hockey for Frölunda HC and represented Denmark at the 2012 World Junior Ice Hockey Championships. Their half brother Michael Smidt has also represented the Danish national team and played all his career in Denmark - including 17 seasons for the Rødovre Mighty Bulls where he also was captain for six seasons before he retired in 2014. Eller and his wife, Julie, have two children.

== Career statistics ==
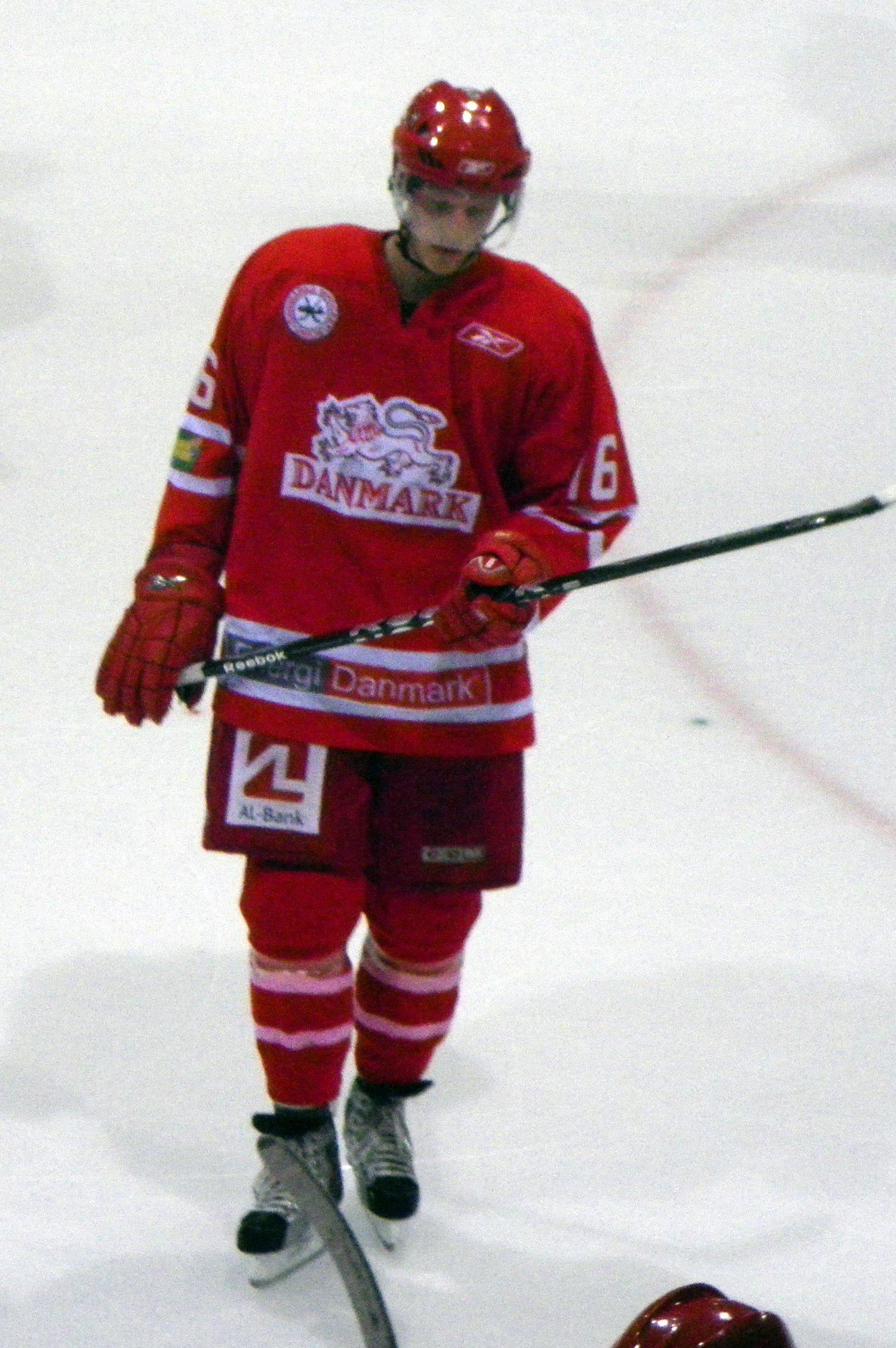
- Eller at the 2010 World Championships

Medal record

Representing Denmark

Men's ice hockey

IIHF World U18 Championship
| Silver medal – second place | 2006 Latvia | Division I Group B |
| Gold medal – first place | 2007 Poland | Division I Group B |

World Junior Ice Hockey Championships
| Gold medal – first place | 2007 Sweden | Division I Group A |
| Silver medal – second place | 2009 Canada | Division I Group B |

=== Regular season and playoffs ===
| | | | Regular season | | | | | Playoffs |
| Season | Team | League | GP | G | A | Pts | PIM | GP | G | A | Pts | PIM |
|---|---|---|---|---|---|---|---|---|---|---|---|---|
| 2004–05 | Rødovre SIK | DNK U20 | 28 | 21 | 26 | 47 | 20 | — | — | — | — | — |
| 2004–05 | Rødovre SIK | DNK.2 | 1 | 3 | 1 | 4 | 0 | — | — | — | — | — |
| 2005–06 | Frölunda HC | J18 Allsv | 8 | 2 | 4 | 6 | 10 | 2 | 0 | 0 | 0 | 0 |
| 2005–06 | Frölunda HC | J20 | 36 | 7 | 7 | 14 | 6 | 2 | 0 | 0 | 0 | 0 |
| 2006–07 | Frölunda HC | J18 Allsv | 2 | 1 | 3 | 4 | 6 | 6 | 3 | 2 | 5 | 8 |
| 2006–07 | Frölunda HC | J20 | 39 | 18 | 37 | 55 | 58 | 8 | 4 | 1 | 5 | 24 |
| 2007–08 | Frölunda HC | J20 | 9 | 4 | 4 | 8 | 10 | 7 | 5 | 6 | 11 | 14 |
| 2007–08 | Borås HC | Allsv | 19 | 2 | 6 | 8 | 8 | — | — | — | — | — |
| 2007–08 | Frölunda HC | SEL | 14 | 0 | 2 | 2 | 4 | 7 | 0 | 1 | 1 | 2 |
| 2008–09 | Frölunda HC | SEL | 48 | 12 | 17 | 29 | 28 | 10 | 3 | 1 | 4 | 12 |
| 2009–10 | Peoria Rivermen | AHL | 70 | 18 | 39 | 57 | 84 | — | — | — | — | — |
| 2009–10 | St. Louis Blues | NHL | 7 | 2 | 0 | 2 | 4 | — | — | — | — | — |
| 2010–11 | Montreal Canadiens | NHL | 77 | 7 | 10 | 17 | 48 | 7 | 0 | 2 | 2 | 4 |
| 2011–12 | Montreal Canadiens | NHL | 79 | 16 | 12 | 28 | 66 | — | — | — | — | — |
| 2012–13 | JYP | SM-l | 15 | 5 | 10 | 15 | 18 | — | — | — | — | — |
| 2012–13 | Montreal Canadiens | NHL | 46 | 8 | 22 | 30 | 45 | 1 | 0 | 0 | 0 | 0 |
| 2013–14 | Montreal Canadiens | NHL | 77 | 12 | 14 | 26 | 68 | 17 | 5 | 8 | 13 | 18 |
| 2014–15 | Montreal Canadiens | NHL | 77 | 15 | 12 | 27 | 42 | 12 | 1 | 2 | 3 | 4 |
| 2015–16 | Montreal Canadiens | NHL | 79 | 13 | 13 | 26 | 28 | — | — | — | — | — |
| 2016–17 | Washington Capitals | NHL | 81 | 12 | 13 | 25 | 36 | 13 | 0 | 5 | 5 | 10 |
| 2017–18 | Washington Capitals | NHL | 81 | 18 | 20 | 38 | 38 | 24 | 7 | 11 | 18 | 18 |
| 2018–19 | Washington Capitals | NHL | 81 | 13 | 23 | 36 | 37 | 7 | 1 | 2 | 3 | 2 |
| 2019–20 | Washington Capitals | NHL | 69 | 16 | 23 | 39 | 48 | 5 | 0 | 1 | 1 | 2 |
| 2020–21 | Washington Capitals | NHL | 44 | 8 | 15 | 23 | 21 | 4 | 0 | 1 | 1 | 0 |
| 2021–22 | Washington Capitals | NHL | 72 | 13 | 18 | 31 | 40 | 6 | 1 | 2 | 3 | 0 |
| 2022–23 | Washington Capitals | NHL | 60 | 7 | 9 | 16 | 36 | — | — | — | — | — |
| 2022–23 | Colorado Avalanche | NHL | 24 | 3 | 4 | 7 | 10 | 7 | 0 | 0 | 0 | 0 |
| 2023–24 | Pittsburgh Penguins | NHL | 82 | 15 | 16 | 31 | 32 | — | — | — | — | — |
| 2024–25 | Pittsburgh Penguins | NHL | 17 | 4 | 3 | 7 | 10 | — | — | — | — | — |
| 2024–25 | Washington Capitals | NHL | 63 | 6 | 9 | 15 | 26 | 9 | 0 | 1 | 1 | 2 |
| 2025–26 | Ottawa Senators | NHL | 68 | 5 | 10 | 15 | 12 | 4 | 0 | 0 | 0 | 0 |
| NHL totals | | | 1,184 | 193 | 246 | 439 | 647 | 116 | 15 | 35 | 50 | 60 |

=== International ===
| Year | Team | Event | Results | GP | G | A | Pts | PIM |
|---|---|---|---|---|---|---|---|---|
| 2006 | Denmark | WJC18 D1 | 2nd | 5 | 5 | 5 | 10 | 8 |
| 2007 | Denmark | WJC D1 | 1st | 5 | 2 | 5 | 7 | 16 |
| 2007 | Denmark | WJC18 D1 | 1st | 5 | 3 | 7 | 10 | 6 |
| 2008 | Denmark | WJC | 10th | 6 | 3 | 3 | 6 | 37 |
| 2008 | Denmark | WC | 12th | 6 | 0 | 2 | 2 | 0 |
| 2009 | Denmark | WJC D1 | 2nd | 5 | 3 | 3 | 6 | 20 |
| 2009 | Denmark | OGQ | DNQ | 3 | 1 | 1 | 2 | 8 |
| 2010 | Denmark | WC | 8th | 7 | 2 | 3 | 5 | 8 |
| 2012 | Denmark | WC | 13th | 7 | 3 | 2 | 5 | 14 |
| 2016 | Denmark | WC | 8th | 8 | 1 | 5 | 6 | 12 |
| 2019 | Denmark | WC | 11th | 3 | 2 | 3 | 5 | 6 |
| 2024 | Denmark | OGQ | Q | 3 | 2 | 2 | 4 | 4 |
| 2026 | Denmark | OG | 9th | 4 | 0 | 1 | 1 | 6 |
| Junior totals | | | | 26 | 16 | 23 | 39 | 87 |
| Senior totals | | | | 41 | 11 | 19 | 30 | 58 |

== Awards and honours ==
| Award | Year | Ref |
NHL
| Stanley Cup champion | 2018 | |

== Notes ==
Awards and achievements
| Preceded by Patrik Berglund | St. Louis Blues first-round draft pick 2007 | Succeeded by Ian Cole |
