= Maciej Szewczyk =

German-Polish footballer

Personal information
- Full name: Maciej Szewczyk
- Date of birth: 12 May 1994 (age 32)
- Place of birth: Meppen, Germany
- Height: 1.83 m (6 ft 0 in)
- Position: Defender

Team information
- Current team: Górnik Złotoryja
- Number: 10

Youth career
- –2008: BKS Bolesławiec
- 2008–2010: 1.FC Kaiserslautern
- 2010–2011: FSV 1920 Offenbach
- 2011–2012: Alemannia Aachen

Senior career*
Years	Team	Apps	(Gls)
2012–2013	Alemannia Aachen	1	(0)
2013	KS Polkowice	12	(0)
2014–2015	Bytovia Bytów	36	(0)
2016	Nadwiślan Góra	6	(0)
2016–2017	Widzew Łódź	16	(0)
2017–2018	VfB Speldorf	40	(0)
2019–2021	DJK Blau-Weiß Mintard	36	(4)
2021–2023	Bobrzanie Bolesławiec	48	(18)
2023–	Górnik Złotoryja	27	(3)

International career
2013	Poland U19	2	(0)
- * Club domestic league appearances and goals as of 12 May 2024

Maciej Szewczyk (born 12 May 1994) is a German-Polish footballer who plays as a defender for IV liga Lower Silesia club Górnik Złotoryja.

== Club career ==
Szewczyk joined KS Polkowice in August 2013 from Alemannia Aachen. He made his 3. Liga debut in the first game of the 2012–13 season on 15 September 2012 against SpVgg Unterhaching.

== Personal life ==
His father Zbigniew Szewczyk is a former professional footballer.

== Honours ==
Bobrzenie Bolesławiec

- Regional league Jelenia Góra: 2021–22
