= Finland at the 2022 Winter Olympics =

- Flag of Finland
- IOC code: FIN
- NOC: Finnish Olympic Committee
- Website: www.olympiakomitea.fi (in Finnish)

in Beijing, China 4–20 February 2022
- Competitors: 94 (50 men and 44 women) in 9 sports
- Flag bearer (opening): Valtteri Filppula
- Flag bearer (closing): Krista Pärmäkoski
- Medals Ranked 16th: Gold 2 Silver 2 Bronze 4 Total 8

Winter Olympics appearances (overview)
- 1924; 1928; 1932; 1936; 1948; 1952; 1956; 1960; 1964; 1968; 1972; 1976; 1980; 1984; 1988; 1992; 1994; 1998; 2002; 2006; 2010; 2014; 2018; 2022; 2026

Finland competed at the 2022 Winter Olympics in Beijing, China, from 4 to 20 February 2022.

Ice hockey player Valtteri Filppula was the country's flagbearer during the opening ceremony. Cross-country skier Krista Pärmäkoski was the flagbearer during the closing ceremony.

Finland's final medal haul of two gold and eight total medals, including its first ever ice hockey gold, marked its best showing since winning four golds in 2002 and nine medals in 2006.

== Medalists ==
The following Finnish competitors won medals at the games. In the discipline sections below, the medalists' names are bolded.

Medal	Name	Sport	Event	Date
Gold	Iivo Niskanen	Cross-country skiing	Men's 15 kilometre classical	11 February
Gold	Finland men's national ice hockey team: Miro Aaltonen; Marko Anttila; Hannes Björninen; Valtteri Filppula (C); Niklas Friman; Markus Granlund; Teemu Hartikainen; Juuso Hietanen; Valtteri Kemiläinen; Leo Komarov; Mikko Lehtonen; Petteri Lindbohm; Saku Mäenalanen; Sakari Manninen; Joonas Nättinen; Atte Ohtamaa; Niko Ojamäki; Juho Olkinuora; Iiro Pakarinen; Harri Pesonen; Ville Pokka; Toni Rajala; Harri Säteri; Frans Tuohimaa; Sami Vatanen	Ice hockey	Men's tournament	20 February
Silver	Kerttu Niskanen	Cross-country skiing	Women's 10 kilometre classical	10 February
Silver	Iivo Niskanen; Joni Mäki	Cross-country skiing	Men's team sprint	16 February
Bronze	Iivo Niskanen	Cross-country skiing	Men's 30 kilometre skiathlon	6 February
Bronze	Krista Pärmäkoski	Cross-country skiing	Women's 10 kilometre classical	10 February
Bronze	Finland women's national ice hockey team: Sanni Hakala; Jenni Hiirikoski; Elisa Holopainen; Sini Karjalainen; Michelle Karvinen; Anni Keisala; Nelli Laitinen; Julia Liikala; Eveliina Mäkinen; Petra Nieminen; Tanja Niskanen; Jenniina Nylund; Meeri Räisänen; Sanni Rantala; Ronja Savolainen; Sofianna Sundelin; Susanna Tapani; Noora Tulus; Minttu Tuominen; Viivi Vainikka; Sanni Vanhanen; Emilia Vesa; Ella Viitasuo	Ice hockey	Women's tournament	16 February
Bronze	Kerttu Niskanen	Cross-country skiing	Women's 30 kilometre freestyle	20 February

== Competitors ==
The following is the list of number of competitors participating at the Games per sport/discipline.

Sport	Men	Women	Total
Alpine skiing	1	3	4
Biathlon	4	4	8
Cross-country skiing	6	7	13
Figure skating	1	2	3
Freestyle skiing	5	1	6
Ice hockey	25	23	48
Nordic combined	5	—N/a	5
Ski jumping	1	2	3
Snowboarding	2	2	4
Total	50	44	94

== Alpine skiing ==
By meeting the basic qualification standards Finland qualified one male and one female alpine skier, and then added two more female quotas during reallocation. The four athletes chosen were named on January 24.

Athlete	Event	Run 1		Run 2		Total	
Athlete	Event	Time	Rank	Time	Rank	Time	Rank
Samu Torsti	Men's giant slalom	DNF		Did not advance			
Riikka Honkanen	Women's giant slalom	DNF		Did not advance			
Erika Pykäläinen	Women's giant slalom	DNF		Did not advance			
Riikka Honkanen	Women's slalom	56.33	37	56.64	37	1:52.97	37
Rosa Pohjolainen	Women's slalom	DNF		Did not advance			
Erika Pykäläinen	Women's slalom	DNF		Did not advance			

== Biathlon ==
Finland has qualified four male and four female biathletes. The Finnish Olympic Committee named Mari Eder, Olli Hiidensalo and Tero Seppälä on December 20, 2021. The rest of the biathletes were named on January 24.

Men

Athlete	Event	Time	Misses	Rank
Tuomas Harjula	Individual	58:14.9	4 (1+2+1+0)	81
Tuomas Harjula	Sprint	28:21.2	2 (0+2)	92
Olli Hiidensalo	Individual	56:45.6	5 (0+2+0+3)	74
Olli Hiidensalo	Pursuit	47:04.9	8 (5+0+1+2)	52
Olli Hiidensalo	Sprint	26:15.5	3 (1+2)	38
Heikki Laitinen	Individual	55:52.8	5 (0+2+1+2)	66
Heikki Laitinen	Pursuit	46:47.2	6 (1+1+1+3)	49
Heikki Laitinen	Sprint	26:41.1	2 (1+1)	54
Tero Seppälä	Individual	52:14.3	2 (0+2+0+0)	23
Tero Seppälä	Mass start	40:47.1	5 (1+0+2+2)	9
Tero Seppälä	Pursuit	43:30.2	7 (1+1+2+3)	21
Tero Seppälä	Sprint	25:47.5	3 (1+2)	25
Heikki Laitinen; Tero Seppälä; Olli Hiidensalo; Tuomas Harjula	Relay	1:26:57.7	18 (4+14)	17

Women

Athlete	Event	Time	Misses	Rank
Mari Eder	Individual	48:42.9	3 (1+0+1+1)	32
Mari Eder	Pursuit	39:15.6	4 (0+1+1+2)	30
Mari Eder	Sprint	22:39.8	2 (0+2)	28
Erika Jänkä	Sprint	24:20.9	0 (0+0)	73
Nastassia Kinnunen	Individual	50:13.5	4 (0+1+2+1)	51
Nastassia Kinnunen	Sprint	24:30.0	3 (1+2)	75
Suvi Minkkinen	Individual	DNS		
Suvi Minkkinen	Pursuit	40:38.0	0 (0+0+0+0)	43
Suvi Minkkinen	Sprint	23:21.7	1 (0+1)	51
Suvi Minkkinen; Mari Eder; Erika Jänkä; Nastassia Kinnunen	Relay	LAP	8 (2+6)	16

Mixed

Athlete	Event	Time	Misses	Rank
Suvi Minkkinen; Mari Eder; Tero Seppälä; Olli Hiidensalo	Relay	1:10:06.7	13 (1+12)	11

== Cross-country skiing ==
Finland has qualified six male and seven female cross-country skiers. The 13 skiers chosen where fully announced on 12 January 2022.

Distance
Men

Athlete	Event	Classical		Freestyle		Final		
Athlete	Event	Time	Rank	Time	Rank	Time	Deficit	Rank
Ristomatti Hakola	15 km classical	—N/a				40:49.6	+2:54.8	28
Perttu Hyvärinen	15 km classical	—N/a				39:00.2	+1:05.4	6
Perttu Hyvärinen	30 km skiathlon	40:13.1	7	38:37.6	9	1:19:22.4	+3:12.6	7
Perttu Hyvärinen	50 km freestyle ^{a}	—N/a				1:14:49.5	+3:16.8	19
Remi Lindholm	15 km classical	—N/a				41:40.0	+3:45.2	45
Remi Lindholm	30 km skiathlon	41:39.5	30	39:35.9	24	1:21:49.4	+5:39.6	25
Remi Lindholm	50 km freestyle ^{a}	—N/a				1:15:55.6	+4:22.9	28
Iivo Niskanen	15 km classical	—N/a				37:54.8	-	1st place, gold medalist(s)
Iivo Niskanen	30 km skiathlon	39:06.1	2	38:33.4	7	1:18:10.0	+2:00.2	3rd place, bronze medalist(s)
Ristomatti Hakola; Iivo Niskanen; Perttu Hyvärinen; Joni Mäki	4 x 10 km relay	—N/a				1:59:28.6	+4:37.9	6

^a Men's 50 km freestyle was shortened to 28.4 km due to weather conditions.

Women

Athlete	Event	Classical		Freestyle		Final		
Athlete	Event	Time	Rank	Time	Rank	Time	Deficit	Rank
Anne Kyllönen	10 km classical	—N/a				29:42.6	+1:36.3	16
Anne Kyllönen	15 km skiathlon	24:14.9	18	23:15.3	22	48:10.0	+3:56.3	22
Anne Kyllönen	30 km freestyle	—N/a				1:31:41.0	+6:47.0	20
Johanna Matintalo	10 km classical	—N/a				29:31.2	+1:24.9	14
Johanna Matintalo	15 km skiathlon	23:12.9	9	22:49.6	16	46:36.5	+2:22.8	12
Johanna Matintalo	30 km freestyle	—N/a				1:31:01.7	+7:07.7	23
Kerttu Niskanen	10 km classical	—N/a				28:06.7	+0.4	2nd place, silver medalist(s)
Kerttu Niskanen	15 km skiathlon	22:31.0	2	21:44.1	7	44:49.8	+36.1	4
Kerttu Niskanen	30 km freestyle	—N/a				1:27:27.3	+2:33.3	3rd place, bronze medalist(s)
Krista Pärmäkoski	10 km classical	—N/a				28:37.8	+31.5	3rd place, bronze medalist(s)
Krista Pärmäkoski	15 km skiathlon	22:33.6	4	22:05.2	9	45:12.1	+58.4	7
Krista Pärmäkoski	30 km freestyle	—N/a				1:28:35.0	+3:41.0	10
Anne Kyllönen; Johanna Matintalo; Kerttu Niskanen; Krista Pärmäkoski	4 x 5 km relay	—N/a				54:02.2	+21.2	4

Sprint
Men

Athlete	Event	Qualification		Quarterfinal		Semifinal		Final	
Athlete	Event	Time	Rank	Time	Rank	Time	Rank	Time	Rank
Joni Mäki	Sprint	2:52.38	23 Q	2:57.59	1 Q	2:51.10	2 Q	3:00.18	4
Lauri Vuorinen	Sprint	2:50.91	11 Q	2:54.64	3	did not advance			14
Iivo Niskanen; Joni Mäki	Team sprint	—N/a				20:17.81	3 Q	19:25.45	2nd place, silver medalist(s)

Women

Athlete	Event	Qualification		Quarterfinal		Semifinal		Final	
Athlete	Event	Time	Rank	Time	Rank	Time	Rank	Time	Rank
Jasmi Joensuu	Sprint	3:21.05	18 Q	3:49.93	6	did not advance			27
Jasmin Kähärä	Sprint	3:20.43	13 Q	3:30.52	6	did not advance			26
Katri Lylynperä	Sprint	3:22.62	24 Q	3:24.29	5	did not advance			23
Kerttu Niskanen; Krista Pärmäkoski	Team sprint	—N/a				23:00.82	2 Q	22:13.71	4

== Figure skating ==
In the 2021 World Figure Skating Championships in Stockholm, Sweden, Finland secured one quota in the ladies singles competition. Finnish Olympic committee named Juulia Turkkila and Matthias Versluis for the ice dance competition on December 20, 2021. Jenni Saarinen was named as the remaining competitor on January 24.

Athlete	Event	SP / SD		FS / FD		Total	
Athlete	Event	Points	Rank	Points	Rank	Points	Rank
Jenni Saarinen	Women's singles	56.97	25 Q	96.07	25	153.04	25
Juulia Turkkila; Matthias Versluis	Ice dance	68.23	16 Q	105.65	15	173.88	15

== Freestyle skiing ==
Freeski
Men

Athlete	Event	Qualification					Final				
Athlete	Event	Run 1	Run 2	Run 3	Best	Rank	Run 1	Run 2	Run 3	Best	Rank
Simo Peltola	Big air	~~49.75~~	~~41.75~~	72.00	72.00	29	did not advance				
Simo Peltola	Slopestyle	35.01	29.25	—N/a	35.01	27	did not advance				
Jon Sallinen	Halfpipe	18.00	18.50	—N/a	18.50	23	did not advance				

Women

Athlete	Event	Qualification					Final				
Athlete	Event	Run 1	Run 2	Run 3	Best	Rank	Run 1	Run 2	Run 3	Best	Rank
Anni Kärävä	Big air	82.50	~~52.50~~	62.00	144.50	12 Q	~~81.00~~	54.00	82.50	136.50	9
Anni Kärävä	Slopestyle	55.80	61.73	—N/a	61.73	15	did not advance				

Moguls

Athlete	Event	Qualification								Final											
Athlete	Event	Run 1				Run 2				Run 1				Run 2				Run 3			
Athlete	Event	Time	Points	Total	Rank	Time	Points	Total	Rank	Time	Points	Total	Rank	Time	Points	Total	Rank	Time	Points	Total	Rank
Olli Penttala	Men's moguls	24.53	60.30	75.95	9 Q	Bye				24.39	58.84	74.68	19	Did not advance							19
Jimi Salonen	Men's moguls	24.30	60.43	76.39	4 Q	Bye				DNF				Did not advance							20
Severi Vierelä	Men's moguls	26.92	57.16	69.66	25	25.58	54.89	69.16	18	Did not advance											28

== Ice hockey ==
Summary

Key:

- OT – Overtime
- GWS – Match decided by penalty-shootout

Team	Event	Group stage					Qualification playoff	Quarterfinal	Semifinal	Final / BM	
Team	Event	Opposition Score	Opposition Score	Opposition Score	Opposition Score	Rank	Opposition Score	Opposition Score	Opposition Score	Opposition Score	Rank
Finland men's	Men's tournament	Slovakia; W 6–2	Latvia; W 3–1	Sweden; W 4–3 OT	—N/a	1 QQ	Bye	Switzerland; W 5–1	Slovakia; W 2–0	ROC; W 2–1	1st place, gold medalist(s)
Finland women's	Women's tournament	United States; L 2–5	Canada; L 1–11	Switzerland; L 2–3	ROC; W 5–0	3 Q	—N/a	Japan; W 7–1	United States; L 1–4	Switzerland; W 4–0	3rd place, bronze medalist(s)

Finland has qualified 25 male competitors and 23 female competitors to the ice hockey tournaments.

=== Men's tournament ===
Finland men's national ice hockey team qualified by being ranked 3rd in the 2019 IIHF World Rankings.

Team roster

The roster was announced on 20 January 2022.

Head coach: Jukka Jalonen

No.	Pos.	Name	Height	Weight	Birthdate	Team
2	D	Ville Pokka	1.83 m (6 ft 0 in)	90 kg (200 lb)	3 June 1994 (aged 27)	(Russia) Avangard Omsk
3	D	Niklas Friman	1.89 m (6 ft 2 in)	94 kg (207 lb)	30 August 1993 (aged 28)	(Finland) Jokerit
4	D	Mikko Lehtonen	1.82 m (6 ft 0 in)	89 kg (196 lb)	16 January 1994 (aged 28)	(Russia) SKA Saint Petersburg
12	F	Marko Anttila	2.03 m (6 ft 8 in)	108 kg (238 lb)	27 May 1985 (aged 36)	(Finland) Jokerit
13	D	Valtteri Kemiläinen	1.84 m (6 ft 0 in)	88 kg (194 lb)	16 December 1991 (aged 30)	(Russia) HC Vityaz
15	F	Miro Aaltonen	1.80 m (5 ft 11 in)	84 kg (185 lb)	7 June 1993 (aged 28)	(Russia) HC Vityaz
20	F	Niko Ojamäki	1.80 m (5 ft 11 in)	84 kg (185 lb)	17 June 1995 (aged 26)	(Russia) HC Vityaz
24	F	Hannes Björninen	1.85 m (6 ft 1 in)	89 kg (196 lb)	19 October 1995 (aged 26)	(Finland) Jokerit
25	F	Toni Rajala	1.79 m (5 ft 10 in)	76 kg (168 lb)	29 March 1991 (aged 30)	(Switzerland) EHC Biel
28	F	Joonas Nättinen	1.89 m (6 ft 2 in)	90 kg (200 lb)	3 January 1991 (aged 31)	(Russia) Severstal Cherepovets
29	G	Harri Säteri	1.86 m (6 ft 1 in)	90 kg (200 lb)	29 December 1989 (aged 32)	(Russia) HC Sibir Novosibirsk
35	G	Frans Tuohimaa	1.88 m (6 ft 2 in)	87 kg (192 lb)	19 August 1991 (aged 30)	(Russia) HC Neftekhimik Nizhnekamsk
38	D	Juuso Hietanen	1.78 m (5 ft 10 in)	83 kg (183 lb)	14 June 1985 (aged 36)	(Switzerland) HC Ambrì-Piotta
40	D	Petteri Lindbohm	1.90 m (6 ft 3 in)	93 kg (205 lb)	23 September 1993 (aged 28)	(Finland) Jokerit
42	D	Sami Vatanen	1.79 m (5 ft 10 in)	84 kg (185 lb)	3 June 1991 (aged 30)	(Switzerland) Genève-Servette HC
45	G	Juho Olkinuora	1.88 m (6 ft 2 in)	91 kg (201 lb)	4 November 1990 (aged 31)	(Russia) Metallurg Magnitogorsk
51	F	Valtteri Filppula (C)	1.82 m (6 ft 0 in)	86 kg (190 lb)	20 March 1984 (aged 37)	(Switzerland) Genève-Servette HC
55	D	Atte Ohtamaa (A)	1.88 m (6 ft 2 in)	92 kg (203 lb)	6 November 1987 (aged 34)	(Finland) Oulun Kärpät
60	F	Markus Granlund	1.80 m (5 ft 11 in)	85 kg (187 lb)	16 April 1993 (aged 28)	(Russia) Salavat Yulaev Ufa
65	F	Sakari Manninen	1.70 m (5 ft 7 in)	71 kg (157 lb)	10 February 1992 (aged 29)	(Russia) Salavat Yulaev Ufa
70	F	Teemu Hartikainen	1.86 m (6 ft 1 in)	91 kg (201 lb)	3 May 1990 (aged 31)	(Russia) Salavat Yulaev Ufa
71	F	Leo Komarov (A)	1.80 m (5 ft 11 in)	93 kg (205 lb)	23 January 1987 (aged 35)	(Russia) SKA Saint Petersburg
80	F	Saku Mäenalanen	1.92 m (6 ft 4 in)	94 kg (207 lb)	24 May 1994 (aged 27)	(Finland) Oulun Kärpät
81	F	Iiro Pakarinen	1.85 m (6 ft 1 in)	90 kg (200 lb)	25 August 1991 (aged 30)	(Finland) Jokerit
82	F	Harri Pesonen	1.80 m (5 ft 11 in)	88 kg (194 lb)	6 August 1988 (aged 33)	(Switzerland) SCL Tigers

Group play

Pos	Team	Pld	W	OTW	OTL	L	GF	GA	GD	Pts	Qualification
1	Finland	3	2	1	0	0	13	6	+7	8	Quarterfinals
2	Sweden	3	2	0	1	0	10	7	+3	7	Quarterfinals
3	Slovakia	3	1	0	0	2	8	12	−4	3	Playoffs
4	Latvia	3	0	0	0	3	5	11	−6	0	Playoffs

Source: IIHF
Rules for classification: Preliminary round tiebreakers

February 10, 2022; 16:40 v	Finland	6–2 (3–1, 1–1, 2–0)	Slovakia	Beijing National Indoor Stadium, Beijing; Attendance: 929

Game reference

Harri Säteri
Goalies
Branislav Konrád
Referees:
(United States) Stephen Reneau
(Russia) Evgenii Romasko
Linesmen:
(Switzerland) David Obwegeser
(United States) Brian Oliver

	0–1	05:33 – Slafkovský (Roman)
Manninen (Hartikainen, Pokka) – 10:17	1–1
Pesonen (Aaltonen, Filppula) (PP) – 14:22	2–1
Aaltonen (Nättinen) – 18:20	3–1
Manninen (Granlund, Lehtonen) – 29:28	4–1
	4–2	31:49 – Slafkovský (Čerešňák, Regenda)
Manninen (Hartikainen) – 40:16	5–2
Aaltonen (Ojamäki, Vatanen) (PP) – 54:57	6–2

10 min
Penalties
6 min
30
Shots
33

February 11, 2022; 21:10 v	Latvia	1–3 (0–0, 0–1, 1–2)	Finland	Wukesong Arena, Beijing; Attendance: 904

Game reference

Jānis Kalniņš
Goalies
Harri Säteri
Referees:
(Canada) Oliver Gouin
(Sweden) Mikael Nord
Linesmen:
(Sweden) Ludvig Lundgren
(Russia) Dmitry Shishlo

	0–1	37:59 – Kemiläinen (Lehtonen, Nättinen)
Ābols (Krastenbergs, Smirnovs) (PP) – 43:01	1–1
	1–2	54:42 – Komarov (Hietanen, Ohtamaa)
	1–3	58:43 – Anttila (Mäenalanen, Lindbohm)

6 min
Penalties
4 min
20
Shots
38

February 13, 2022; 16:40 v	Finland	4–3 OT (0–0, 0–3, 3–0) (OT: 1–0)	Sweden	Beijing National Indoor Stadium, Beijing; Attendance: 963

Game reference

Juho Olkinuora
Goalies
Magnus Hellberg
Referees:
(Canada) Michael Campbell
(Russia) Roman Gofman
Linesmen:
(United States) William Hancock
(Russia) Nikita Shalagin

	0–1	24:24 – Wallmark (Tömmernes, Pudas) (PP)
	0–2	28:39 – Bengtsson (Tömmernes, Bromé) (PP)
	0–3	31:36 – Lander (Pudas, Klingberg) (PP)
Hartikainen (Manninen, Vatanen) (PP) – 45:34	1–3
Pakarinen (Hartikainen, Manninen) (PP) – 55:30	2–3
Pakarinen (Lehtonen, Hartikainen) – 57:11	3–3
Pesonen – 62:01	4–3

37 min
Penalties
8 min
27
Shots
30

Quarterfinals

February 16, 2022; 16:40 v	Finland	5–1 (2–0, 1–1, 2–0)	Switzerland	Beijing National Indoor Stadium, Beijing; Attendance: 948

Game reference

Harri Säteri
Goalies
Reto Berra
Leonardo Genoni
Referees:
(Latvia) Andris Ansons
(Canada) Oliver Gouin
Linesmen:
(Czech Republic) Daniel Hynek
(United States) Brian Oliver

Aaltonen (Friman, Nättinen) – 08:37	1–0
Lehtonen (Hietanen, Manninen) – 10:45	2–0
Anttila (Björninen) – 23:08	3–0
	3–1	37:49 – Ambühl (Corvi, Haas) (PP)
Pakarinen (Filppula, Pesonen) (ENG) – 55:28	4–1
Hartikainen (ENG) – 56:47	5–1

4 min
Penalties
4 min
23
Shots
34

Semifinals

February 18, 2022; 12:10 v	Finland	2–0 (1–0, 0–0, 1–0)	Slovakia	Beijing National Indoor Stadium, Beijing; Attendance: 1,071

Game reference
Harri Säteri	Goalies	Patrik Rybár	Referees: (Sweden) Tobias Björk (Russia) Yevgeni Romasko; Linesmen: (Russia) Gleb Lazarev (Canada) Dustin McCrank
Manninen (Lindbohm, Vatanen) – 15:58 / 1–0; Pesonen (Hartikainen, Pokka) (ENG) – 59:21 / 2–0			Referees: (Sweden) Tobias Björk (Russia) Yevgeni Romasko; Linesmen: (Russia) Gleb Lazarev (Canada) Dustin McCrank
0 min	Penalties	6 min	Referees: (Sweden) Tobias Björk (Russia) Yevgeni Romasko; Linesmen: (Russia) Gleb Lazarev (Canada) Dustin McCrank
27	Shots	28	Referees: (Sweden) Tobias Björk (Russia) Yevgeni Romasko; Linesmen: (Russia) Gleb Lazarev (Canada) Dustin McCrank

Gold medal game

February 20, 2022; 12:10 v	Finland	2–1 (0–1, 1–0, 1–0)	ROC	Beijing National Indoor Stadium, Beijing; Attendance: 1,288

Game reference

Harri Säteri
Goalies
Ivan Fedotov
Referees:
(Sweden) Tobias Björk
(United States) Andrew Bruggeman
Linesmen:
(United States) William Hancock
(Canada) Dustin McCrank

	0–1	07:17 – Grigorenko (Nesterov, Gusev) (PP)
Pokka (Björninen, Ohtamaa) – 23:28	1–1
Björninen (Anttila, Ohtamaa) – 40:31	2–1

2 min
Penalties
6 min
31
Shots
17

=== Women's tournament ===
Finland women's national ice hockey team qualified by being ranked 3rd in the 2020 IIHF World Rankings.

Team roster

The roster was announced on 20 January 2022.

Head coach: Pasi Mustonen

No.	Pos.	Name	Height	Weight	Birthdate	Team
1	G	Eveliina Mäkinen	1.75 m (5 ft 9 in)	68 kg (150 lb)	12 April 1995 (aged 26)	(Sweden) Brynäs IF
2	D	Sini Karjalainen	1.74 m (5 ft 9 in)	68 kg (150 lb)	30 January 1999 (aged 23)	(United States) Vermont Catamounts
6	D	Jenni Hiirikoski	1.62 m (5 ft 4 in)	62 kg (137 lb)	30 March 1987 (aged 34)	(Sweden) Luleå HF
7	D	Sanni Rantala	1.73 m (5 ft 8 in)	63 kg (139 lb)	8 July 2002 (aged 19)	(Finland) Kiekko-Espoo
8	D	Ella Viitasuo	1.72 m (5 ft 8 in)	69 kg (152 lb)	27 May 1996 (aged 25)	(Finland) Kiekko-Espoo
9	D	Nelli Laitinen	1.69 m (5 ft 7 in)	62 kg (137 lb)	29 April 2002 (aged 19)	(Finland) Kiekko-Espoo
10	F	Elisa Holopainen	1.66 m (5 ft 5 in)	58 kg (128 lb)	27 December 2001 (aged 20)	(Finland) Kiekko-Espoo
12	F	Sanni Vanhanen	1.65 m (5 ft 5 in)	57 kg (126 lb)	1 July 2005 (aged 16)	(Finland) Tappara U16
15	D	Minttu Tuominen	1.65 m (5 ft 5 in)	73 kg (161 lb)	26 June 1990 (aged 31)	(Finland) Kiekko-Espoo
16	F	Petra Nieminen	1.69 m (5 ft 7 in)	68 kg (150 lb)	4 May 1999 (aged 22)	(Sweden) Luleå HF
18	G	Meeri Räisänen	1.70 m (5 ft 7 in)	66 kg (146 lb)	2 December 1989 (aged 32)	(Finland) JYP U20 Akatemia
23	F	Sanni Hakala	1.54 m (5 ft 1 in)	54 kg (119 lb)	31 October 1997 (aged 24)	(Sweden) HV71
24	F	Viivi Vainikka	1.66 m (5 ft 5 in)	67 kg (148 lb)	23 December 2001 (aged 20)	(Sweden) Luleå HF
27	F	Julia Liikala	1.66 m (5 ft 5 in)	63 kg (139 lb)	20 March 2001 (aged 20)	(Finland) HIFK
28	F	Jenniina Nylund	1.71 m (5 ft 7 in)	64 kg (141 lb)	18 June 1999 (aged 22)	(United States) St. Cloud State Huskies
32	F	Emilia Vesa	1.77 m (5 ft 10 in)	66 kg (146 lb)	3 January 2001 (aged 21)	(Finland) Kiekko-Espoo
33	F	Michelle Karvinen	1.67 m (5 ft 6 in)	65 kg (143 lb)	27 March 1990 (aged 31)	(Sweden) Malmö Redhawks
34	F	Sofianna Sundelin	1.69 m (5 ft 7 in)	55 kg (121 lb)	13 January 2003 (aged 19)	(Finland) Team Kuortane
36	G	Anni Keisala	1.75 m (5 ft 9 in)	80 kg (180 lb)	5 April 1997 (aged 24)	(Finland) Ilves
40	F	Noora Tulus	1.65 m (5 ft 5 in)	56 kg (123 lb)	15 August 1995 (aged 26)	(Sweden) Luleå HF
61	F	Tanja Niskanen	1.76 m (5 ft 9 in)	72 kg (159 lb)	11 September 1992 (aged 29)	(Finland) KalPa
77	F	Susanna Tapani	1.77 m (5 ft 10 in)	68 kg (150 lb)	2 March 1993 (aged 28)	(China) KRS Vanke Rays
88	D	Ronja Savolainen	1.77 m (5 ft 10 in)	75 kg (165 lb)	29 November 1997 (aged 24)	(Sweden) Luleå HF

Group play

Pos	Team	Pld	W	OTW	OTL	L	GF	GA	GD	Pts	Qualification
1	Canada	4	4	0	0	0	33	5	+28	12	Quarterfinals
2	United States	4	3	0	0	1	20	6	+14	9	Quarterfinals
3	Finland	4	1	0	0	3	10	19	−9	3 (Note: Finland 3 Pts, +4 GD; ROC 3 Pts, −2 GD; Switzerland 3 Pts, −2 GD. ROC defeated Switzerland 5–2.)	Quarterfinals
4	ROC	4	1	0	0	3	6	18	−12	3	Quarterfinals
5	Switzerland	4	1	0	0	3	6	27	−21	3	Quarterfinals

Source: IIHF
Rules for classification: Tiebreakers
Notes:

3 February 2022; 21:10 v	Finland	2–5 (0–2, 0–2, 2–1)	United States	Wukesong Arena, Beijing; Attendance: 335

Game reference

Anni Keisala
Goalies
Maddie Rooney
Referees:
(United States) Kelly Cooke
(Canada) Lacey Senuk
Linesmen:
(Canada) Alex Clarke
(United States) Sara Strong

	0–1	10:37 – Kessel (Harmon)
	0–2	13:00 – Carpenter (Pannek, Dunne) (PP)
	0–3	25:32 – Coyne Schofield (Barnes, Compher)
	0–4	26:36 – Coyne Schofield (Harmon, Knight)
Tapani (Laitinen, Nieminen) (PP) – 43:15	1–4
	1–5	48:01 – Carpenter (Roque, Kessel)
Tapani (Karvinen) (PP) – 57:40	2–5

8 min
Penalties
6 min
12
Shots
52

5 February 2022; 12:10 v	Canada	11–1 (2–1, 5–0, 4–0)	Finland	Wukesong Arena, Beijing; Attendance: 670

Game reference

Ann-Renée Desbiens
Goalies
Meeri Räisänen
Anni Keisala
Referees:
(United States) Chelsea Rapin
(Switzerland) Anna Wiegand
Linesmen:
(Germany) Lisa Linnek
(Sweden) Veronica Lovensnö

Fillier (Spooner, Thompson) – 01:01	1–0
Nurse – 12:45	2–0
	2–1	18:27 – Tuominen
Fillier (Fast, Spooner) – 23:22	3–1
Nurse (Spooner, Rattray) – 30:01	4–1
Jenner (Larocque, Poulin) – 31:20	5–1
Jenner (Zandee-Hart, Poulin) – 34:27	6–1
Stacey (Maltais, Shelton) – 36:35	7–1
Rattray (Jenner, Bell) – 47:06	8–1
Nurse (Ambrose, Spooner) – 53:07	9–1
Stacey (Shelton, Bell) – 54:10	10–1
Jenner (Clark, Poulin) – 54:45	11–1

14 min
Penalties
8 min
48
Shots
29

7 February 2022; 21:10 v	Switzerland	3–2 (1–0, 1–1, 1–1)	Finland	Beijing National Indoor Stadium, Beijing; Attendance: 742

Game reference

Andrea Brändli
Goalies
Anni Keisala
Referees:
(Canada) Cianna Lieffers
(Canada) Elizabeth Mantha
Linesmen:
(United States) Kendall Hanley
(Russia) Diana Mokhova

Christen (Müller, Stalder) (PP2) – 11:52	1–0
	1–1	27:49 – Laitinen (Savolainen, Tuominen) (PP)
Rüegg (Müller, Leemann) (PP, EA) – 30:00	2–1
Stalder (Müller, Sigrist) – 41:21	3–1
	3–2	50:11 – Holopainen (Vainikkaa, Tulus)

6 min
Penalties
14 min
24
Shots
40

8 February 2022; 21:10 v	Finland	5–0 (2–0, 3–0, 0–0)	ROC	Beijing National Indoor Stadium, Beijing; Attendance: 797

Game reference

Anni Keisala
Goalies
Maria Sorokina
Valeria Merkusheva
Referees:
(United States) Kelly Cooke
(Switzerland) Anna Wiegand
Linesmen:
(Canada) Alex Clarke
(United States) Sara Strong

Rantala (Niskanen) – 09:06	1–0
Karvinen (Nieminen, Tulus) (PP) – 18:18	2–0
Nylund (Vanhanen, Rantala) – 27:09	3–0
Tuominen (Laitinen) (PP) – 30:37	4–0
Tapani (Hiirikoski, Tulus) (PP) – 31:06	5–0

6 min
Penalties
14 min
30
Shots
19

Quarterfinals

12 February 2022; 16:40 v	Finland	7–1 (2–1, 2–0, 3–0)	Japan	Wukesong Arena, Beijing; Attendance: 675

Game reference

Anni Keisala
Goalies
Nana Fujimoto
Akane Konishi
Referees:
(Canada) Cianna Lieffers
(Switzerland) Anna Wiegand
Linesmen:
(Germany) Lisa Linnek
(Sweden) Veronica Lovensnö

Nieminen (Tulus, Hiirikoski) (PP) – 02:08	1–0
Vainikka (Laitinen, Holopainen) – 04:32	2–0
	2–1	15:01 – Shiga (H. Toko)
Karvinen (Nieminen, Tapani) – 25:01	3–1
Nieminen (Karvinen, Laitinen) – 28:29	4–1
Nieminen (Tapani, Hiirikoski) – 40:18	5–1
Tapani (Karvinen, Nieminen) – 48:28	6–1
Hakala (Niskanen, Laitinen) – 52:29	7–1

8 min
Penalties
4 min
49
Shots
25

Semifinals

14 February 2022; 21:10 v	United States	4–1 (0–0, 2–0, 2–1)	Finland	Wukesong Arena, Beijing; Attendance: 642

Game reference

Alex Cavallini
Goalies
Anni Keisala
Referees:
(United States) Kelly Cooke
(Canada) Cianna Lieffers
Linesmen:
(Sweden) Anna Hammar
(Austria) Julia Kainberger

Barnes (Brandt, Knight) (PP) – 23:39	1–0
Knight (Harmon, Coyne Schofield) – 38:53	2–0
Scamurra (Barnes) – 55:20	3–0
	3–1	59:34 – Tapani (Karvinen, Hiirikoski) (EA)
Roque (Carpenter, Kessel) (ENG) – 59:55	4–1

6 min
Penalties
6 min
42
Shots
26

Bronze medal game

16 February 2022; 19:30 v	Finland	4–0 (1–0, 0–0, 3–0)	Switzerland	Wukesong Arena, Beijing; Attendance: 724

Game reference

Anni Keisala
Goalies
Andrea Brändli
Referees:
(Canada) Elizabeth Mantha
(Canada) Lacey Senuk
Linesmen:
(Canada) Alex Clarke
(United States) Sara Strong

Vainikkaa (Tulus, Holopainen) – 11:38	1–0
Tapani (SH) – 43:24	2–0
Laitinen (Holopainen, Savolainen) (PP) – 54:24	3–0
Karvinen (Nieminen, Hiirikoski) (PP) – 59:03	4–0

8 min
Penalties
8 min
47
Shots
15

== Nordic Combined ==
Athlete	Event	Ski jumping			Cross-country		Total	
Athlete	Event	Distance	Points	Rank	Time	Rank	Time	Rank
Ilkka Herola	Large hill/10 km	117.5	95.9	25	26:02.1	7	28:58.1	16
Ilkka Herola	Normal hill/10 km	100.0	115.7	8	24:24.1	=4	25:33.1	6
Eero Hirvonen	Large hill/10 km	123.0	94.6	26	26:16.3	9	29:17.3	20
Eero Hirvonen	Normal hill/10 km	93.0	104.1	19	25:06.3	15	27:02.3	17
Arttu Mäkiaho	Large hill/10 km	121.0	87.9	28	26:21.0	12	29:49.0	24
Arttu Mäkiaho	Normal hill/10 km	95.5	95.1	27	25:14.3	19	27:46.3	23
Otto Niittykoski	Large hill/10 km	118.0	79.2	37	28:00.3	38	32:02.3	37
Perttu Reponen	Normal hill/10 km	90.0	94.2	28	25:09.7	18	27:44.7	22
Ilkka Herola; Arttu Mäkiaho; Perttu Reponen; Eero Hirvonen	Team large hill/4 x 5km	481.0	385.1	8	51:24.1	3	53:24.1	8

== Ski jumping ==
Athlete	Event	Qualification			First round			Final			Total	
Athlete	Event	Distance	Points	Rank	Distance	Points	Rank	Distance	Points	Rank	Points	Rank
Antti Aalto	Men's normal hill	98.5	105.0	8 Q	101.5	130.5	10 Q	99.5	125.6	9	256.1	12
Antti Aalto	Men's large hill	126.5	123.0	7 Q	131.0	124.3	24 Q	134.0	132.9	13	257.2	17
Julia Kykkänen	Women's normal hill	—N/a			82.5	72.6	25 Q	75.0	67.5	26	140.1	27
Jenny Rautionaho	Women's normal hill	—N/a			66.5	48.5	32	did not advance			48.5	32

== Snowboarding ==
Freestyle
Men

Athlete	Event	Qualification					Final				
Athlete	Event	Run 1	Run 2	Run 3	Best	Rank	Run 1	Run 2	Run 3	Best	Rank
Kalle Järvilehto	Big air	~~22.75~~	85.75	22.00	107.75	18	Did not advance				
Rene Rinnekangas	Big air	78.75	~~12.25~~	60.75	139.50	13	Did not advance				
Kalle Järvilehto	Slopestyle	15.06	28.73	—N/a	28.73	28	did not advance				
Rene Rinnekangas	Slopestyle	67.10	60.10	—N/a	67.10	13	did not advance				

Women

Athlete	Event	Qualification					Final				
Athlete	Event	Run 1	Run 2	Run 3	Best	Rank	Run 1	Run 2	Run 3	Best	Rank
Carola Niemelä	Big air	~~12.75~~	58.50	42.25	100.75	20	Did not advance				
Enni Rukajärvi	Big air	25.75	~~17.25~~	63.50	89.25	22	Did not advance				
Carola Niemelä	Slopestyle	22.36	38.43	—N/a	38.43	21	did not advance				
Enni Rukajärvi	Slopestyle	66.75	78.83	—N/a	78.83	3 Q	30.51	71.45	23.43	71.45	7

== See also ==
- Finland at the 2022 Winter Paralympics
