= Ice hockey at the 2022 Winter Olympics =

Ice hockey at the XXIV Olympic Winter Games
- Ice hockey pictogram
- Venues: Beijing National Indoor Stadium; Wukesong Arena
- Dates: 3–20 February 2022
- No. of events: 2 (1 men and 1 women)
- Competitors: 530 from 13 nations

Men's ice hockey at the XXIV Olympic Winter Games

Medalists
| 1st place, gold medalist(s) | | Finland |
| 2nd place, silver medalist(s) | | ROC |
| 3rd place, bronze medalist(s) | | Slovakia |

Women's ice hockey at the XXIV Olympic Winter Games

Medalists
| 1st place, gold medalist(s) | | Canada |
| 2nd place, silver medalist(s) | | United States |
| 3rd place, bronze medalist(s) | | Finland |

The ice hockey competitions of the 2022 Winter Olympics were played at two venues located in the Beijing cluster: the Beijing National Indoor Stadium, which seats 18,000, located at the Olympic Green area, and the Wukesong Arena, seating 10,000, with both arenas having been constructed for the 2008 Summer Olympics.

The men's tournament had 12 teams competing, and the women's tournament 10 for the first time (an increase of two from 2018). Two events were contested, one each for men and women.

== Medal summary ==
=== Medal table ===
| Rank | Nation | Gold | Silver | Bronze | Total |
|---|---|---|---|---|---|
| 1 | Finland | 1 | 0 | 1 | 2 |
| 2 | Canada | 1 | 0 | 0 | 1 |
| 3 | ROC | 0 | 1 | 0 | 1 |
| 3 | United States | 0 | 1 | 0 | 1 |
| 5 | Slovakia | 0 | 0 | 1 | 1 |
| Totals (5 entries) | | 2 | 2 | 2 | 6 |

=== Medalists ===
| Event | Gold | Silver | Bronze |
|---|---|---|---|
| Men's | Finland; Miro Aaltonen; Marko Anttila; Hannes Björninen; Valtteri Filppula; Niklas Friman; Markus Granlund; Teemu Hartikainen; Juuso Hietanen; Valtteri Kemiläinen; Leo Komarov; Mikko Lehtonen; Petteri Lindbohm; Saku Mäenalanen; Sakari Manninen; Joonas Nättinen; Atte Ohtamaa; Niko Ojamäki; Juho Olkinuora; Iiro Pakarinen; Harri Pesonen; Ville Pokka; Toni Rajala; Harri Säteri; Frans Tuohimaa; Sami Vatanen | ROC; Sergei Andronov; Timur Bilyalov; Andrei Chibisov; Ivan Fedotov; Stanislav Galiev; Mikhail Grigorenko; Arseni Gritsyuk; Nikita Gusev; Pavel Karnaukhov; Artur Kayumov; Artyom Minulin; Nikita Nesterov; Alexander Nikishin; Sergei Plotnikov; Alexander Samonov; Kirill Semyonov; Damir Sharipzyanov; Vadim Shipachyov; Anton Slepyshev; Sergei Telegin; Vladimir Tkachyov; Dmitri Voronkov; Slava Voynov; Egor Yakovlev; Alexander Yelesin | Slovakia; Peter Cehlárik; Michal Čajkovský; Peter Čerešňák; Marek Ďaloga; Marko Daňo; Martin Gernát; Adrián Holešinský; Marek Hrivík; Libor Hudáček; Tomáš Jurčo; Miloš Kelemen; Samuel Kňažko; Branislav Konrád; Michal Krištof; Martin Marinčin; Šimon Nemec; Kristián Pospíšil; Pavol Regenda; Miloš Roman; Mislav Rosandić; Patrik Rybár; Juraj Slafkovský; Samuel Takáč; Matej Tomek; Peter Zuzin |
| Women's | Canada; Erin Ambrose; Ashton Bell; Kristen Campbell; Emily Clark; Mélodie Daoust; Ann-Renée Desbiens; Renata Fast; Sarah Fillier; Brianne Jenner; Rebecca Johnston; Jocelyne Larocque; Emma Maltais; Emerance Maschmeyer; Sarah Nurse; Marie-Philip Poulin; Jamie Lee Rattray; Jill Saulnier; Ella Shelton; Natalie Spooner; Laura Stacey; Claire Thompson; Blayre Turnbull; Micah Zandee-Hart | United States; Cayla Barnes; Megan Bozek; Hannah Brandt; Dani Cameranesi; Alex Carpenter; Alex Cavallini; Jesse Compher; Kendall Coyne Schofield; Brianna Decker; Jincy Roese; Savannah Harmon; Caroline Harvey; Nicole Hensley; Megan Keller; Amanda Kessel; Hilary Knight; Abbey Murphy; Kelly Pannek; Maddie Rooney; Abby Roque; Hayley Scamurra; Lee Stecklein; Grace Zumwinkle | Finland; Sanni Hakala; Jenni Hiirikoski; Elisa Holopainen; Sini Karjalainen; Michelle Karvinen; Anni Keisala; Nelli Laitinen; Julia Liikala; Eveliina Mäkinen; Petra Nieminen; Tanja Niskanen; Jenniina Nylund; Meeri Räisänen; Sanni Rantala; Ronja Savolainen; Sofianna Sundelin; Susanna Tapani; Noora Tulus; Minttu Tuominen; Viivi Vainikka; Sanni Vanhanen; Emilia Vesa; Ella Viitasuo |

== Venues ==
| Beijing National Indoor Stadium Capacity: 19,418 | Wukesong Arena Capacity: 15,384 |
|---|---|
| Beijing National Indoor Stadium | Cadillac Arena |
| Beijing | Beijing |

== Competition schedule ==
| PR | Preliminary round | PO | Playoffs | QF | Quarter-finals | SF | Semi-finals | B | Bronze-medal match | G | Gold-medal match |

| Date Event | Thu 3 | Fri 4 | Sat 5 | Sun 6 | Mon 7 | Tue 8 | Wed 9 | Thu 10 | Fri 11 | Sat 12 | Sun 13 | Mon 14 | Tue 15 | Wed 16 | Thu 17 | Fri 18 | Sat 19 | Sun 20 |
|---|---|---|---|---|---|---|---|---|---|---|---|---|---|---|---|---|---|---|
| Men's tournament | | | | | | | PR | PR | PR | PR | PR | | PO | QF | | SF | B | G |
| Women's tournament | PR | PR | PR | PR | PR | PR | | | QF | QF | | SF | | B | G | | | |

== Men's tournament ==
The tournament featured twelve countries, eight qualifying through the IIHF World Ranking, the host China, and three through qualifying tournaments. The format remained the same as the previous three Olympics; three groups of four compete in three games to determine seeding, each played every other team in their group, followed by four rounds of elimination games. Each group winner received a bye into the second round, along with the highest ranked of the remaining teams. The remaining eight teams played an eliminating qualification game to advance to the quarter-final round. Each quarter-final winner advanced to the semi-finals with the winners playing for the gold medal and the losers playing for the bronze. With the cancellation of the 2020 Men's Ice Hockey World Championships, the groups were established on 24 April 2020, using the IIHF world rankings where seeding counted for the ranking points in unplayed tournaments.

On 10 July 2020, the National Hockey League Players' Association (NHLPA) and National Hockey League agreed to a renewed collective bargaining agreement, which includes a provision opening the possibility for the NHL to explore participation at the 2022 and 2026 Winter Olympics. On 22 July 2021, the NHL released a 2021–22 schedule that included an Olympic break, but the league also announced that a final agreement had not yet been reached regarding Olympic participation of NHL players in 2022. On 3 September 2021, an agreement was made to allow NHL players to compete.

On 22 December 2021, the NHL and the NHLPA announced that NHL players would not be participating in the men's ice hockey tournament at the 2022 Games. COVID-19 had forced a change in the NHL schedule; with approximately 50 games postponed, the NHL was to use the Olympic break to make up its own postponed games rather than have the players compete in the Olympics.

=== Qualification ===
Qualification for the men's tournament at the 2022 Winter Olympics was determined by the IIHF World Ranking following the 2019 Men's Ice Hockey World Championships. The top eight joined the hosts and three qualifiers.

=== Participating nations ===
The groups were established on 24 April 2020 in absence of a World Championship. Qualifiers one, two, and three, were the winners of the final qualification tournaments. Their designation was determined by their qualification seeding.

Due to the lack of ice hockey talent in China, players had to be recruited from abroad. The men's hockey team had eleven Canadians, nine Chinese, three Americans, and a Russian.

| Group A | Group B | Group C |
|---|---|---|
| Canada; United States; Germany; China | ROC; Czech Republic; Switzerland; Denmark | Finland; Sweden; Slovakia; Latvia |

== Women's tournament ==
For the first time ten countries competed in the women's tournament, six qualifying through the IIHF World Ranking, the host China, and three through qualifying tournaments held in November 2021. The qualification groups and schedule will be established at the 2020 IIHF Annual Congress.

=== Qualification ===
Qualification for the women's tournament at the 2022 Winter Olympics were supposed to be determined by the IIHF World Ranking following the 2020 Women's Ice Hockey World Championships, but they were cancelled due to the COVID-19 pandemic. The top six ranked nations were established by using their seeding for ranking points in unplayed tournaments in 2020.

=== Participating nations ===
Qualifiers Czech Republic, Denmark, and Sweden, were the winners of the final qualification tournaments. Their designation was determined by their qualification seeding.

| Group A | Group B |
|---|---|
| United States; Canada; Finland; ROC; Switzerland | Japan; Czech Republic; Sweden; Denmark; China |

== Qualification summary / Participating NOC's ==
| Nations | Men | Women | Athletes |
|---|---|---|---|
| Canada | Yes | Yes | 48 |
| China | Yes | Yes | 48 |
| Czech Republic | Yes | Yes | 48 |
| Denmark | Yes | Yes | 48 |
| Finland | Yes | Yes | 48 |
| Germany | Yes | | 25 |
| Japan | | Yes | 23 |
| Latvia | Yes | | 25 |
| ROC | Yes | Yes | 48 |
| Slovakia | Yes | | 25 |
| Sweden | Yes | Yes | 48 |
| Switzerland | Yes | Yes | 48 |
| United States | Yes | Yes | 48 |
| Total: 13 NOCs | 12 | 10 | 530 |
