= Hannes Björninen =

Finnish ice hockey player (born 1995)

- Born: 19 October 1995 (age 30) Lahti, Finland
- Height: 6 ft 1 in (185 cm)
- Weight: 187 lb (85 kg; 13 st 5 lb)
- Position: Centre
- Shoots: Left
- NL team Former teams: SCL Tigers; Lahti Pelicans; Jokerit; Brynäs IF; Örebro HK
- National team: Finland
- Playing career: 2014–present

Hannes Björninen (born 19 October 1995) is a Finnish professional ice hockey player who is a centre for SCL Tigers of the National League (NL).

== Playing career ==
Björninen made his Liiga debut playing with Lahti Pelicans during the 2014–15 season.

Following his third season as captain and seventh overall with the Lahti Pelicans, Björninen left as a free agent and signed a two-year contract with Finnish Kontinental Hockey League competitors, Jokerit, on 5 May 2021. In the 2021–22 season, Björninen posted 10 goals and 21 points through 43 regular season games with Jokerit before the club's withdrawal to the KHL prior to the playoffs in the due to the Russian invasion of Ukraine. He subsequently returned his original Finnish club, Pelicans of the Liiga, for the remainder of the campaign.

On 28 April 2022, Björninen left the Liiga and the Pelicans for the second season in succession, agreeing to a two-year contract with Swedish SHL club, Brynäs IF. Following Brynäs relegation to the Allsvenskan in the 2022–23 season, Björninen opted to remain in the SHL, leaving the club to sign a two-year contract with Örebro HK on 28 April 2023.

== International play ==
Medal record

Representing Finland

Ice hockey

Olympic Games
Gold medal – first place	2022 Beijing	

World Championships
Gold medal – first place	2022 Finland	
Gold medal – first place	2026 Switzerland	
Silver medal – second place	2021 Latvia	

Björninen played for Team Finland at the 2022 Winter Olympics, scoring the winning goal in the Gold Medal Game and bringing gold to Finland for the first time.

== Career statistics ==
=== Regular season and playoffs ===
			Regular season					Playoffs
Season	Team	League	GP	G	A	Pts	PIM	GP	G	A	Pts	PIM
2011–12	Pelicans	FIN U18 Q	8	3	0	3	4	—	—	—	—	—
2011–12	Pelicans	FIN U18	30	4	11	15	12	—	—	—	—	—
2012–13	Pelicans	FIN U18	14	4	10	14	8	—	—	—	—	—
2012–13	Pelicans	FIN U20	35	2	6	8	14	—	—	—	—	—
2013–14	Pelicans	FIN U20	48	16	35	51	30	12	4	7	11	10
2014–15	Pelicans	FIN U20	1	1	1	2	2	—	—	—	—	—
2014–15	Pelicans	Liiga	46	1	5	6	40	—	—	—	—	—
2014–15	KooKoo	Mestis	—	—	—	—	—	17	4	4	8	12
2015–16	Pelicans	Liiga	53	6	9	15	34	8	0	3	3	2
2015–16	Peliitat	Mestis	2	2	0	2	0	—	—	—	—	—
2016–17	Pelicans	Liiga	60	8	16	24	20	5	0	0	0	0
2017–18	Pelicans	Liiga	39	10	7	17	14	3	0	0	0	2
2018–19	Pelicans	Liiga	58	14	20	34	69	6	2	2	4	2
2019–20	Pelicans	Liiga	39	11	17	28	22	—	—	—	—	—
2020–21	Pelicans	Liiga	49	16	31	47	49	5	3	4	7	2
2021–22	Jokerit	KHL	43	10	11	21	16	—	—	—	—	—
2021–22	Pelicans	Liiga	10	3	3	6	0	3	1	0	1	0
2022–23	Brynäs IF	SHL	52	11	14	25	22	—	—	—	—	—
2023–24	Örebro HK	SHL	52	6	19	25	18	3	0	1	1	0
2024–25	Örebro HK	SHL	48	6	16	22	55	3	0	1	1	6
2025–26	SCL Tigers	NL	40	10	13	23	16	—	—	—	—	—
Liiga totals			354	69	108	177	248	30	6	9	15	8
KHL totals			43	10	11	21	16	—	—	—	—	—
SHL totals			152	23	49	72	95	11	1	2	3	8

=== International ===
Year	Team	Event	Result	GP	G	A	Pts	PIM
2015	Finland	WJC	7th	5	0	0	0	0
2021	Finland	WC	2nd place, silver medalist(s)	9	2	0	2	2
2022	Finland	OG	1st place, gold medalist(s)	6	1	2	3	2
2022	Finland	WC	1st place, gold medalist(s)	10	1	2	3	0
2023	Finland	WC	7th	8	1	4	5	2
2024	Finland	WC	8th	8	2	0	2	4
2025	Finland	WC	7th	8	0	2	2	4
2026	Finland	WC	1st place, gold medalist(s)	10	1	3	4	4
Junior totals				5	0	0	0	0
Senior totals				59	8	13	21	18
