= Joonas Nättinen =

Finnish ice hockey player

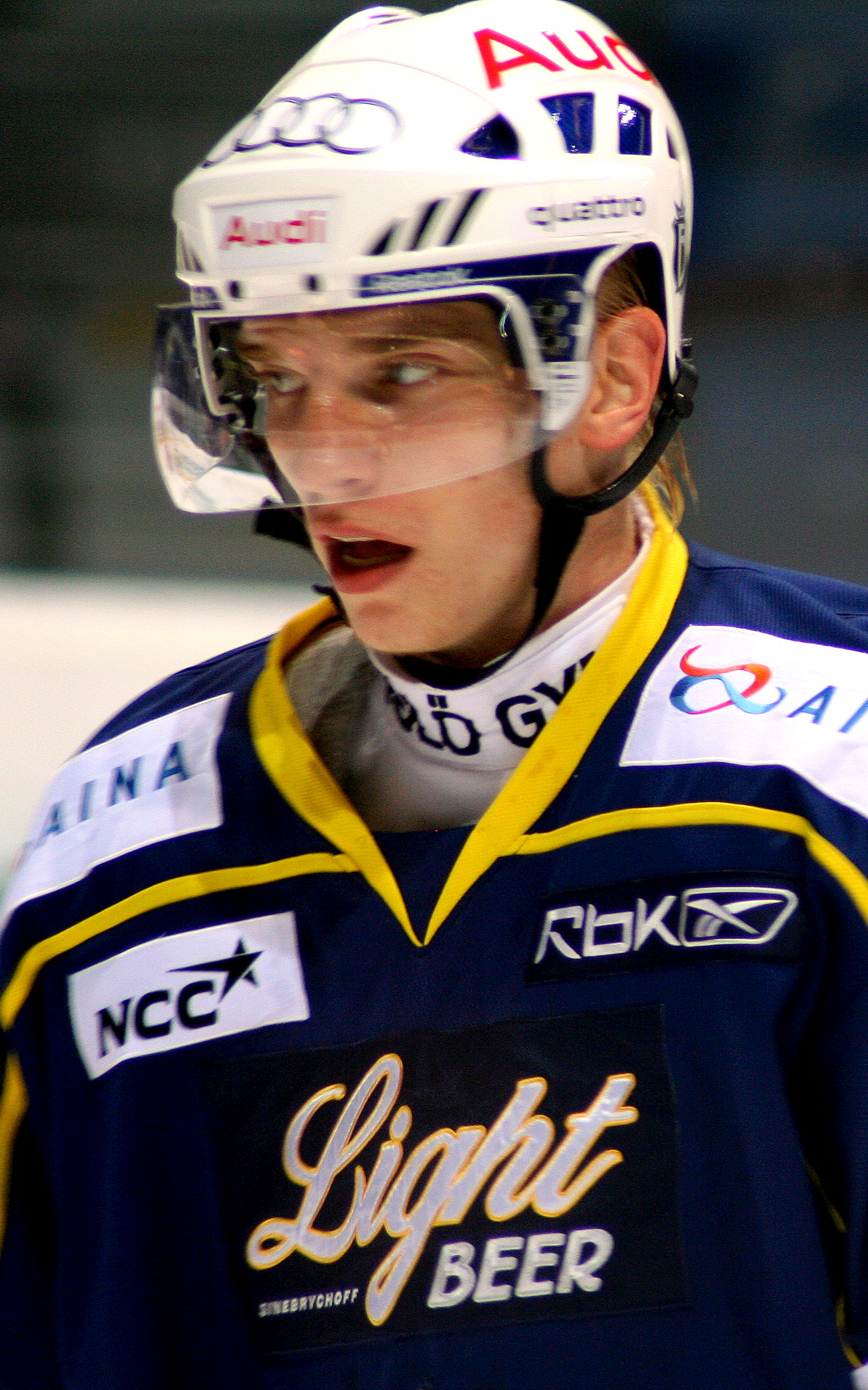
- Born: January 3, 1991 (age 35) Jämsä, Finland
- Height: 6 ft 2 in (188 cm)
- Weight: 183 lb (83 kg; 13 st 1 lb)
- Position: Center
- Shoots: Right
- DEL team Former teams: October 2026 Iserlohn Roosters; Espoo Blues; HPK; Montreal Canadiens; Modo Hockey; JYP Jyväskylä; Neftekhimik Nizhnekamsk; HC Vityaz; Severstal Cherepovets; HV71
- National team: Finland
- NHL draft: 65th overall, 2009; Montreal Canadiens
- Playing career: 2008–present

Joonas Aleksanteri Nättinen (born January 3, 1991) is a Finnish professional ice hockey player who is an unrestricted free agent. He was selected in the third round, 65th overall, by the Montreal Canadiens in the 2009 NHL entry draft.

== Playing career ==
In 2008, Nättinen as a JYP-trained player began playing in the SM-liiga for the Espoo Blues. In the 2009 NHL entry draft, he was chosen in the third round, 65th overall, by the Montreal Canadiens.

On 26 May 2011, Joonas signed a three-year, entry-level contract with the Canadiens worth $1.825 million at the NHL level. While in the final year of his contract during the 2013–14 season, Nättinen was recalled from affiliate, the Hamilton Bulldogs of the American Hockey League, and joined the Canadiens on 17 January 2014. He made his NHL debut the following day in a brief appearance for the Canadiens in a defeat against the Toronto Maple Leafs. After his singular game with the Canadiens, Nättinen was returned to the Bulldogs for the remainder of the season.

On 5 June 2014, as a restricted free agent, Nättinen opted to return to Europe, signing a one-year contract with Modo Hockey of the Swedish Hockey League.

Nättinen returned to the Finnish Liiga to play in three seasons with JYP before opting to return abroad, securing a one-year contract with Russian club, HC Neftekhimik Nizhnekamsk of the KHL on 2 May 2018. In the 2018–19 season, Nättinen adapted quickly to the KHL to post 16 goals and 28 points in 54 regular season games.

As a free agent at the conclusion of his contract, Nättinen opted to continue in the KHL, signing a one-year contract with HC Vityaz on 2 May 2019.

Approaching his third season in the KHL, Nättinen joined his third club, agreeing to a contract with Severstal Cherepovets on 8 August 2020.

After two seasons with Severstal, Nättinen left the KHL as a free agent and returned for a second stint in the SHL, signing a two-year contract with HV71 on 3 June 2022.

== Career statistics ==
=== Regular season and playoffs ===
| | | | Regular season | | | | | Playoffs |
| Season | Team | League | GP | G | A | Pts | PIM | GP | G | A | Pts | PIM |
|---|---|---|---|---|---|---|---|---|---|---|---|---|
| 2006–07 | JYP | FIN U18 | 30 | 10 | 25 | 35 | 22 | — | — | — | — | — |
| 2007–08 | JYP | FIN U18 | 34 | 14 | 34 | 48 | 22 | — | — | — | — | — |
| 2007–08 | JYP | FIN U20 | 8 | 0 | 2 | 2 | 2 | 3 | 0 | 2 | 2 | 2 |
| 2008–09 | Blues | FIN U20 | 30 | 9 | 29 | 38 | 6 | 10 | 3 | 10 | 13 | 4 |
| 2008–09 | Blues | SM-l | 14 | 0 | 0 | 0 | 4 | — | — | — | — | — |
| 2008–09 | Suomi U20 | Mestis | 5 | 2 | 2 | 4 | 0 | — | — | — | — | — |
| 2009–10 | Blues | FIN U20 | 11 | 7 | 6 | 13 | 2 | — | — | — | — | — |
| 2009–10 | Blues | SM-l | 23 | 0 | 3 | 3 | 4 | 1 | 0 | 0 | 0 | 0 |
| 2009–10 | Hokki | Mestis | 10 | 2 | 2 | 4 | 0 | — | — | — | — | — |
| 2009–10 | Suomi U20 | Mestis | 7 | 0 | 8 | 8 | 6 | — | — | — | — | — |
| 2010–11 | Blues | FIN U20 | 2 | 0 | 2 | 2 | 0 | — | — | — | — | — |
| 2010–11 | Blues | SM-l | 11 | 0 | 0 | 0 | 6 | — | — | — | — | — |
| 2010–11 | HPK | SM-l | 10 | 0 | 2 | 2 | 6 | 1 | 0 | 1 | 1 | 0 |
| 2010–11 | Suomi U20 | Mestis | 2 | 0 | 0 | 0 | 0 | — | — | — | — | — |
| 2011–12 | Hamilton Bulldogs | AHL | 63 | 11 | 10 | 21 | 30 | — | — | — | — | — |
| 2012–13 | Hamilton Bulldogs | AHL | 24 | 5 | 4 | 9 | 8 | — | — | — | — | — |
| 2013–14 | Hamilton Bulldogs | AHL | 69 | 8 | 7 | 15 | 22 | — | — | — | — | — |
| 2013–14 | Montreal Canadiens | NHL | 1 | 0 | 0 | 0 | 0 | — | — | — | — | — |
| 2014–15 | Modo Hockey | SHL | 55 | 7 | 11 | 18 | 38 | — | — | — | — | — |
| 2015–16 | JYP | Liiga | 46 | 9 | 12 | 21 | 16 | 13 | 2 | 2 | 4 | 8 |
| 2016–17 | JYP | Liiga | 46 | 8 | 23 | 31 | 51 | 15 | 3 | 4 | 7 | 16 |
| 2017–18 | JYP | Liiga | 49 | 13 | 27 | 40 | 35 | 6 | 1 | 4 | 5 | 0 |
| 2018–19 | Neftekhimik Nizhnekamsk | KHL | 54 | 16 | 12 | 28 | 46 | — | — | — | — | — |
| 2019–20 | HC Vityaz | KHL | 50 | 9 | 12 | 21 | 23 | 3 | 0 | 0 | 0 | 4 |
| 2020–21 | Severstal Cherepovets | KHL | 35 | 5 | 15 | 20 | 10 | 3 | 1 | 0 | 1 | 4 |
| 2021–22 | Severstal Cherepovets | KHL | 43 | 9 | 10 | 19 | 22 | 6 | 4 | 3 | 7 | 15 |
| 2022–23 | HV71 | SHL | 23 | 3 | 3 | 6 | 6 | — | — | — | — | — |
| 2023–24 | HV71 | SHL | 30 | 2 | 8 | 10 | 12 | — | — | — | — | — |
| 2024–25 | Ilves | Liiga | 44 | 8 | 10 | 18 | 24 | 10 | 2 | 4 | 6 | 6 |
| 2025–26 | Ilves | Liiga | 50 | 3 | 9 | 12 | 14 | 3 | 0 | 0 | 0 | 0 |
| Liiga totals | | | 293 | 41 | 86 | 127 | 160 | 49 | 8 | 15 | 23 | 20 |
| NHL totals | | | 1 | 0 | 0 | 0 | 0 | — | — | — | — | — |
| KHL totals | | | 182 | 39 | 49 | 88 | 101 | 12 | 5 | 3 | 8 | 23 |

=== International ===
Medal record

Representing Finland

Ice hockey

Olympic Games
| Gold medal – first place | 2022 Beijing | |

World U18 Championship
| Bronze medal – third place | 2009 United States | |

| Year | Team | Event | Result | GP | G | A | Pts | PIM |
|---|---|---|---|---|---|---|---|---|
| 2008 | Finland | U17 | 6th | 5 | 2 | 4 | 6 | 8 |
| 2008 | Finland | WJC18 | 6th | 6 | 2 | 2 | 4 | 8 |
| 2009 | Finland | WJC | 7th | 6 | 1 | 2 | 3 | 0 |
| 2009 | Finland | WJC18 | 3rd place, bronze medalist(s) | 6 | 1 | 3 | 4 | 6 |
| 2010 | Finland | WJC | 6th | 6 | 0 | 4 | 4 | 4 |
| 2011 | Finland | WJC | 6th | 6 | 3 | 0 | 3 | 2 |
| 2022 | Finland | OG | 1st place, gold medalist(s) | 6 | 0 | 3 | 3 | 0 |
| Junior totals | | | | 35 | 10 | 14 | 24 | 30 |
| Senior totals | | | | 6 | 0 | 3 | 3 | 0 |
