= Markus Granlund =

Finnish ice hockey player (born 1993)

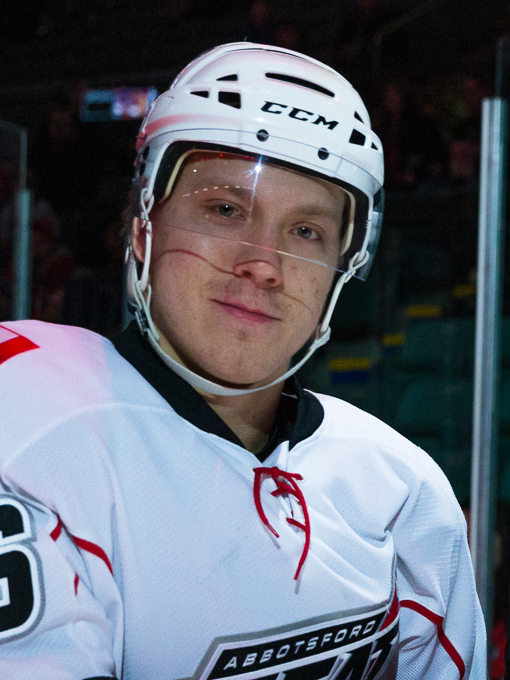
- Granlund with the Abbotsford Heat in 2014
- Born: 16 April 1993 (age 33) Oulu, Finland
- Height: 6 ft 0 in (183 cm)
- Weight: 183 lb (83 kg; 13 st 1 lb)
- Position: Centre
- Shoots: Left
- NL team Former teams: Genève-Servette HC; HIFK; Calgary Flames; Vancouver Canucks; Edmonton Oilers; Salavat Yulaev Ufa; HC Lugano
- National team: Finland
- NHL draft: 45th overall, 2011; Calgary Flames
- Playing career: 2010–present

Kari Markus Granlund (born 16 April 1993) is a Finnish professional ice hockey forward who is currently playing with Genève-Servette HC of the National League (NL). He is a second-round selection of the Calgary Flames, taken 45th overall at the 2011 NHL entry draft. Granlund played two seasons in the SM-liiga for HIFK before moving to North America to join the Flames organization in 2013. His older brother Mikael plays in the NHL for the Anaheim Ducks.

== Playing career ==
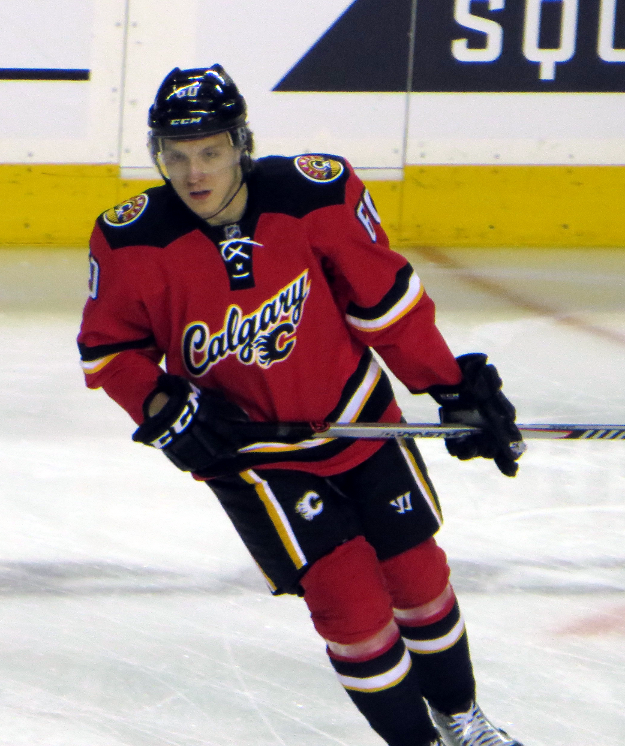
Granlund with the Calgary Flames in 2014

A native of Oulu, Finland, Granlund played minor hockey in his hometown before joining Helsinki-based club HIFK's junior teams in 2009. He made his SM-liiga debut in the 2010–11 season, appearing in two games with the senior squad, but spent the majority of the year with HIFK's junior team, where he recorded 20 goals and 52 points in 40 games. The National Hockey League (NHL)'s Calgary Flames selected him with their second-round pick, 45th overall, at the 2011 NHL entry draft. Granlund opted to remain in Finland for the 2011–12 season where he joined HIFK's senior team full-time and played on the same line as his brother, Mikael. Markus finished the season with 34 points in 47 games, then recorded 30 points in 50 games for HIFK in 2012–13.

Granlund moved to North America following his second year in the SM-liiga as he signed a three-year contract with the Flames on 19 April 2013. He was assigned to Calgary's American Hockey League (AHL) affiliate, the Abbotsford Heat, to begin the 2013–14 season. He initially struggled to adapt to life in Canada, and while he had a clause in his contract that would allow him to return to Finland, Granlund opted to remain with the Flames organization. He earned a brief recall to Calgary in late December 2013 but did not appear in an NHL game. Granlund was the AHL's leading goal scorer among rookies with 23 at the time of his second recall in late February, and made his NHL debut on 27 February 2014, in a 2–0 loss to the Los Angeles Kings. He recorded his first NHL point in his third game, an assist on 3 March against his brother's Minnesota Wild. On the same day, the AHL named him that league's rookie of the month for February. He recorded 12 points in 10 games and was a +6 over that time. Granlund scored his first goal two nights later in a 4–1 win over the Ottawa Senators.

In the 2015–16 season, the last season of his entry-level deal, Granlund was reassigned to begin the year with new AHL affiliate, the Stockton Heat. The Flames recalled him after scoring a goal and assist in the Heat's inaugural game on 15 October 2015. After 31 games with the Flames, contributing with 7 points, Granlund was traded by Calgary to the Vancouver Canucks in exchange for Hunter Shinkaruk on 22 February 2016. On 22 June 2018, the Canucks re-signed Granlund to a one-year, 1.475M contract.

During the 2019 offseason, the Canucks did not tender a qualifying offer to Granlund, releasing him as a free agent. On 1 July 2019, he agreed to a one-year, $1.3 million contract with his third Western Canadian club, the Edmonton Oilers. In the 2019–20 season, Granlund struggled to make an impression with the Oilers collecting just three goals and 4 points in 34 regular season games before he was waived and reassigned to AHL affiliate, the Bakersfield Condors. Granlund registered 15 points in 20 games with the Condors before the season was abruptly ended due to the COVID-19 pandemic.

As an impending free agent and left off the Oilers' return-to-play roster, Granlund halted his NHL career by agreeing to a two-year contract with Russian club Salavat Yulaev Ufa of the Kontinental Hockey League on 17 July 2020.

During the midst of his second season with Salavat, in March 2022, Granlund left Salavat Yulaev Ufa ahead of the playoffs due to the Russian invasion of Ukraine.

As a free agent, Granlund continued his European career by signing a two-year contract with Swiss National League club, HC Lugano, on 19 July 2022.

On 31 May 2024, Granlund signed with NL team Genève-Servette HC.

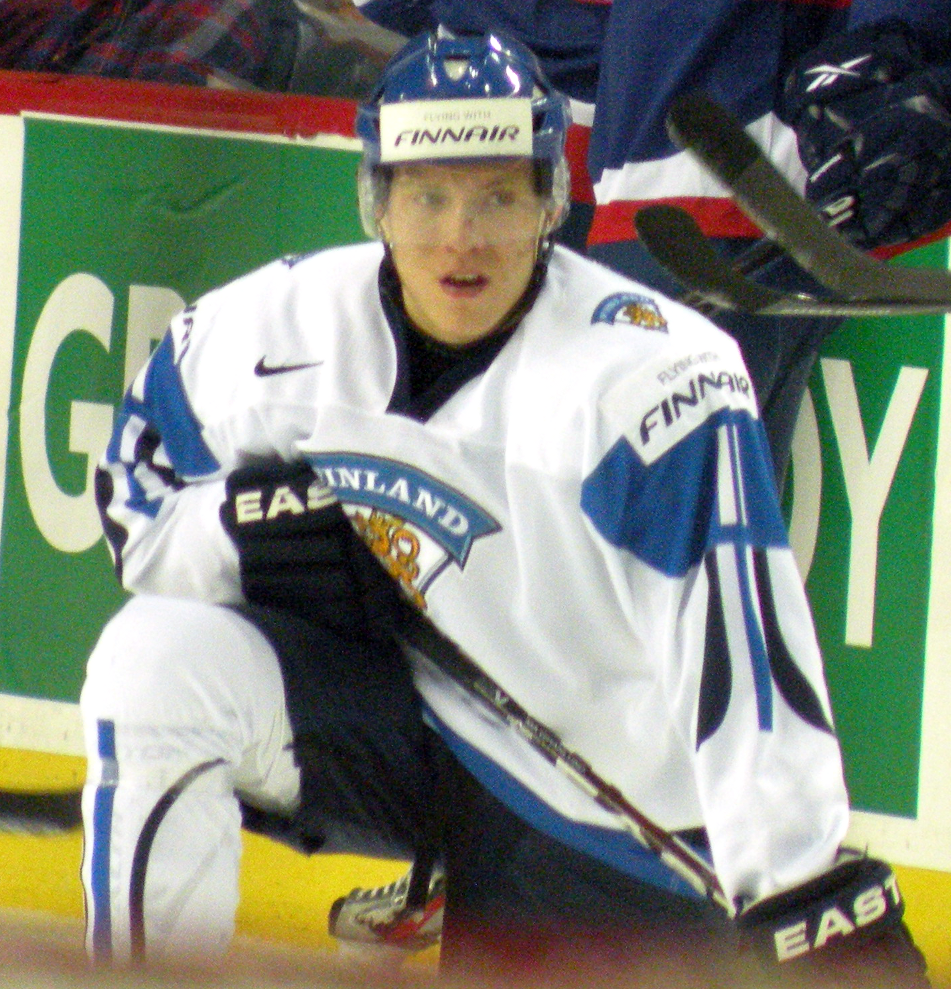

Medal record

Representing Finland

Olympic Games
Gold medal – first place	2022 Beijing	

IIHF World U18 Championships
Bronze medal – third place	2010 Belarus	

== Career statistics ==
=== Regular season and playoffs ===
			Regular season					Playoffs
Season	Team	League	GP	G	A	Pts	PIM	GP	G	A	Pts	PIM
2009–10	HIFK	FIN U18	8	9	17	26	6	—	—	—	—	—
2009–10	HIFK	FIN U20	37	17	25	42	38	14	2	11	13	18
2010–11	HIFK	FIN U20	40	20	32	52	49	5	4	5	9	6
2010–11	HIFK	SM-l	2	0	0	0	0	—	—	—	—	—
2010–11	Team Finland U20	Mestis	6	3	3	6	6	—	—	—	—	—
2011–12	HIFK	SM-l	47	15	19	34	18	3	0	0	0	0
2011–12	Kiekko–Vantaa	Mestis	1	0	0	0	0	—	—	—	—	—
2011–12	HIFK	FIN U20	—	—	—	—	—	1	1	0	1	0
2012–13	HIFK	SM-l	50	10	20	30	18	5	1	2	3	4
2013–14	Abbotsford Heat	AHL	50	23	21	44	22	4	2	3	5	2
2013–14	Calgary Flames	NHL	7	2	1	3	0	—	—	—	—	—
2014–15	Adirondack Flames	AHL	21	9	8	17	14	—	—	—	—	—
2014–15	Calgary Flames	NHL	48	8	10	18	16	3	0	1	1	0
2015–16	Stockton Heat	AHL	12	5	4	9	10	—	—	—	—	—
2015–16	Calgary Flames	NHL	31	4	3	7	8	—	—	—	—	—
2015–16	Vancouver Canucks	NHL	16	2	1	3	6	—	—	—	—	—
2016–17	Vancouver Canucks	NHL	69	19	13	32	14	—	—	—	—	—
2017–18	Vancouver Canucks	NHL	53	8	4	12	8	—	—	—	—	—
2018–19	Vancouver Canucks	NHL	77	12	10	22	20	—	—	—	—	—
2019–20	Edmonton Oilers	NHL	34	3	1	4	14	—	—	—	—	—
2019–20	Bakersfield Condors	AHL	20	6	9	15	14	—	—	—	—	—
2020–21	Salavat Yulaev Ufa	KHL	50	23	30	53	26	9	3	5	8	6
2021–22	Salavat Yulaev Ufa	KHL	41	8	30	38	16	—	—	—	—	—
2022–23	HC Lugano	NL	47	22	23	45	22	7	2	6	8	8
2023–24	HC Lugano	NL	20	4	12	16	10	—	—	—	—	—
2024–25	Genève–Servette HC	NL	39	21	26	47	42	—	—	—	—	—
2025–26	Genève–Servette HC	NL	49	22	32	54	20	12	4	5	9	2
SM-l totals			99	25	39	64	36	—	—	—	—	—
NHL totals			335	58	43	101	86	3	0	1	1	0
KHL totals			91	31	60	91	42	9	3	5	8	6

=== International ===
Year	Team	Event	Result	GP	G	A	Pts	PIM
2010	Finland	U17	10th	5	2	3	5	16
2010	Finland	WJC18	3rd place, bronze medalist(s)	6	1	5	6	4
2011	Finland	WJC18	5th	6	2	8	10	6
2012	Finland	WJC	4th	7	2	5	7	6
2013	Finland	WJC	7th	6	5	7	12	4
2022	Finland	OG	1st place, gold medalist(s)	6	0	1	1	25
Junior totals				30	12	28	40	36
Senior totals				6	0	1	1	25

== See also ==
- List of family relations in the NHL
