= Atte Ohtamaa =

Finnish ice hockey player (born 1987)

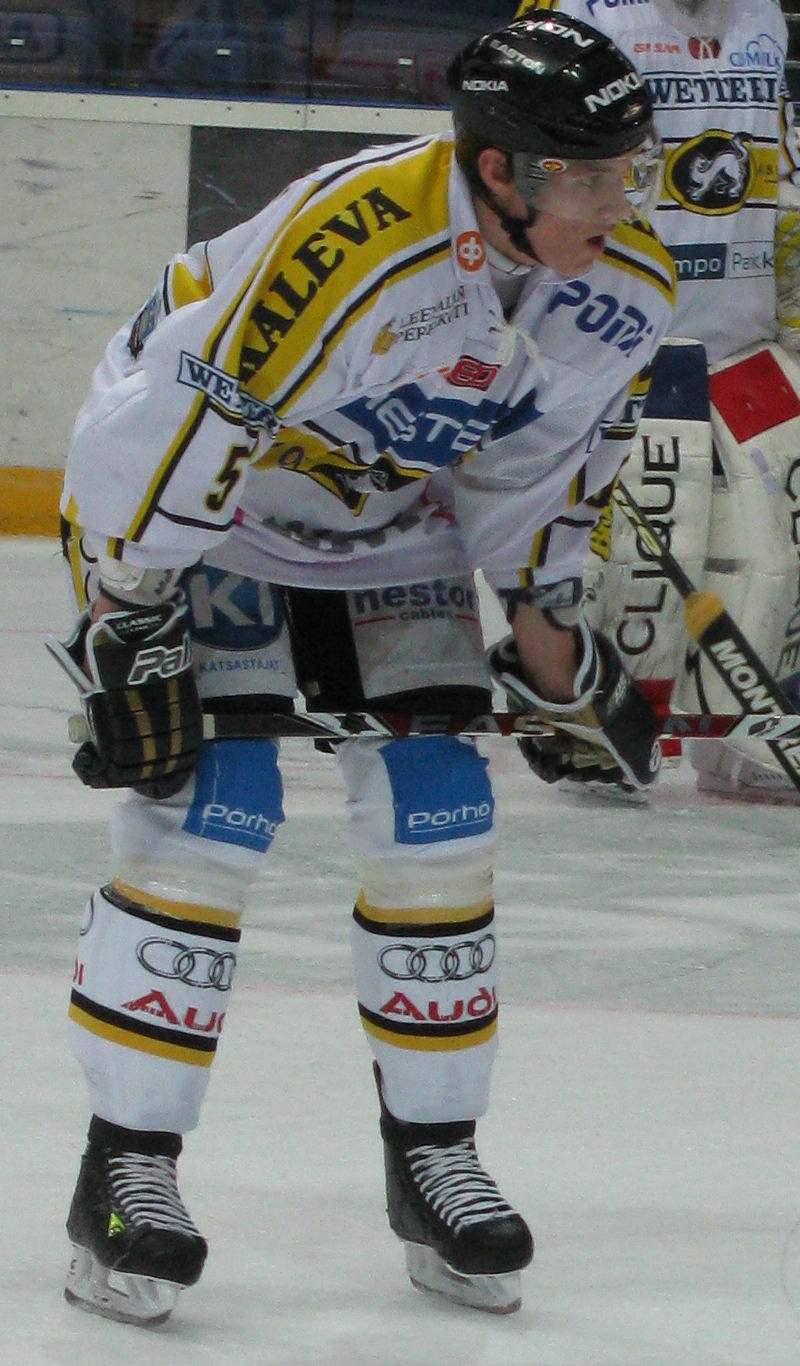
- Born: 6 November 1987 (age 38) Nivala, Finland
- Height: 6 ft 2 in (188 cm)
- Weight: 203 lb (92 kg; 14 st 7 lb)
- Position: Defense
- Shoots: Left
- Liiga team Former teams: Oulun Kärpät; Jokerit; Ak Bars Kazan; HC Lugano; Barys Nur-Sultan; Lokomotiv Yaroslavl
- National team: Finland
- Playing career: 2007–present

Atte Petteri Ohtamaa (born 6 November 1987) is a Finnish professional ice hockey defenceman for Oulun Kärpät of the Liiga.

== Playing career ==
Ohtamaa's youth team was Nivala Cowboys before he transferred to Oulun Kärpät at the Junior B level.

In 2018, Ohtamaa returned to Liiga after four seasons in the KHL. He signed a five-year contract with Oulun Kärpät. The contract included clauses to play two seasons abroad.

Ohtamaa excerised the first clause-year of his option for the 2019–20 season. On 27 August 2019, Ohtamaa joined HC Lugano of the National League (NL) on a two-month contract until 3 November 2019. He was brought in as their fifth import player in case of injuries. Ohtamaa played 17 games with Lugano (3 points) before being released on 2 November 2019. He was then loaned to Kazakh-based KHL club, Barys Nur-Sultan, for the remainder of the season.

He used the second clause-year in the following season, and on 1 May 2020, Ohtamaa opted to continue in the KHL, securing a one-year contract with Russian club Lokomotiv Yaroslavl. Ohtamaa returned to Kärpät for the 2021–22 Liiga season in accordance to his ongoing contract. He was named the captain of the team.

Ohtamaa signed a one-year extension with Kärpät for the 2023–24 season, and again for the 2024–25 season.

== International play ==
Medal record

Representing Finland

Ice hockey

Olympic Games
Gold medal – first place	2022 Beijing	

World Championships
Gold medal – first place	2019 Slovakia	
Gold medal – first place	2022 Finland	
Silver medal – second place	2014 Belarus	
Silver medal – second place	2016 Russia	
Silver medal – second place	2021 Latvia	

Ohtamaa was named to the Finland men's national ice hockey team for competition at the 2014 IIHF World Championship.

== Career statistics ==
=== Regular season and playoffs ===
			Regular season					Playoffs
Season	Team	League	GP	G	A	Pts	PIM	GP	G	A	Pts	PIM
2003–04	Kärpät	FIN U16	17	2	8	10	28	—	—	—	—	—
2004–05	Kärpät	FIN U18	30	0	10	10	28	2	0	0	0	4
2005–06	Kärpät	FIN U20	38	5	5	10	46	12	3	2	5	8
2006–07	Kärpät	FIN U20	42	7	22	29	38	—	—	—	—	—
2006–07	Suomi U20	Mestis	3	0	0	0	0	—	—	—	—	—
2007–08	Kärpät	FIN U20	10	1	7	8	16	—	—	—	—	—
2007–08	Kärpät	SM-l	10	1	0	1	8	1	0	0	0	0
2007–08	Hokki	Mestis	15	4	5	9	16	—	—	—	—	—
2008–09	Kärpät	FIN U20	2	1	2	3	4	—	—	—	—	—
2008–09	Kärpät	SM-l	48	0	2	2	32	15	0	0	0	27
2009–10	Kärpät	SM-l	51	2	7	9	30	6	1	0	1	4
2010–11	Kärpät	SM-l	45	2	9	11	32	2	0	0	0	2
2011–12	Kärpät	SM-l	48	4	8	12	30	5	0	0	0	8
2012–13	Kärpät	SM-l	60	3	15	18	55	3	0	0	0	4
2013–14	Kärpät	Liiga	57	5	17	22	61	16	2	1	3	10
2014–15	Jokerit	KHL	55	1	9	10	37	10	1	3	4	6
2015–16	Jokerit	KHL	59	4	4	8	46	4	0	0	0	2
2016–17	Ak Bars Kazan	KHL	55	2	10	12	10	15	1	1	2	10
2017–18	Ak Bars Kazan	KHL	47	3	3	6	16	19	1	5	6	10
2018–19	Kärpät	Liiga	47	8	15	23	24	17	0	3	3	10
2019–20	HC Lugano	NL	18	1	2	3	16	—	—	—	—	—
2019–20	Barys Nur–Sultan	KHL	36	6	15	21	18	5	1	1	2	2
2020–21	Lokomotiv Yaroslavl	KHL	46	6	9	15	18	11	0	2	2	0
2021–22	Kärpät	Liiga	46	8	19	27	22	7	0	0	0	0
2022–23	Kärpät	Liiga	54	4	12	16	20	3	0	1	1	0
2023–24	Kärpät	Liiga	53	8	19	27	18	12	0	4	4	2
2024–25	Kärpät	Liiga	58	1	9	10	20	—	—	—	—	—
2025–26	Kärpät	Liiga	57	6	5	11	49	—	—	—	—	—
Liiga totals			634	52	137	189	401	87	3	9	12	67
KHL totals			298	22	50	72	145	64	4	12	16	30

=== International ===
Year	Team	Event	Result	GP	G	A	Pts	PIM
2014	Finland	WC	2nd place, silver medalist(s)	10	0	1	1	4
2015	Finland	WC	6th	7	0	0	0	6
2016	Finland	WC	2nd place, silver medalist(s)	10	1	1	2	0
2017	Finland	WC	4th	10	1	1	2	18
2018	Finland	OG	6th	5	0	0	0	0
2019	Finland	WC	1st place, gold medalist(s)	10	1	1	2	4
2021	Finland	WC	2nd place, silver medalist(s)	10	1	1	2	4
2022	Finland	OG	1st place, gold medalist(s)	6	0	3	3	2
2022	Finland	WC	1st place, gold medalist(s)	10	0	1	1	2
2023	Finland	WC	7th	8	2	1	3	2
Senior totals				86	6	10	16	42

== Awards and honors ==
- Won the Finnish Champion (Kanada-malja) 2x: 2007–08, 2013–14.
- SM-Liiga, Runner-up 3x: 2008–09, 2015–16, 2018–19
- KHL, (Gagarin Cup) 1x: 2017–18
