= Marko Anttila =

Finnish ice hockey player (born 1985)

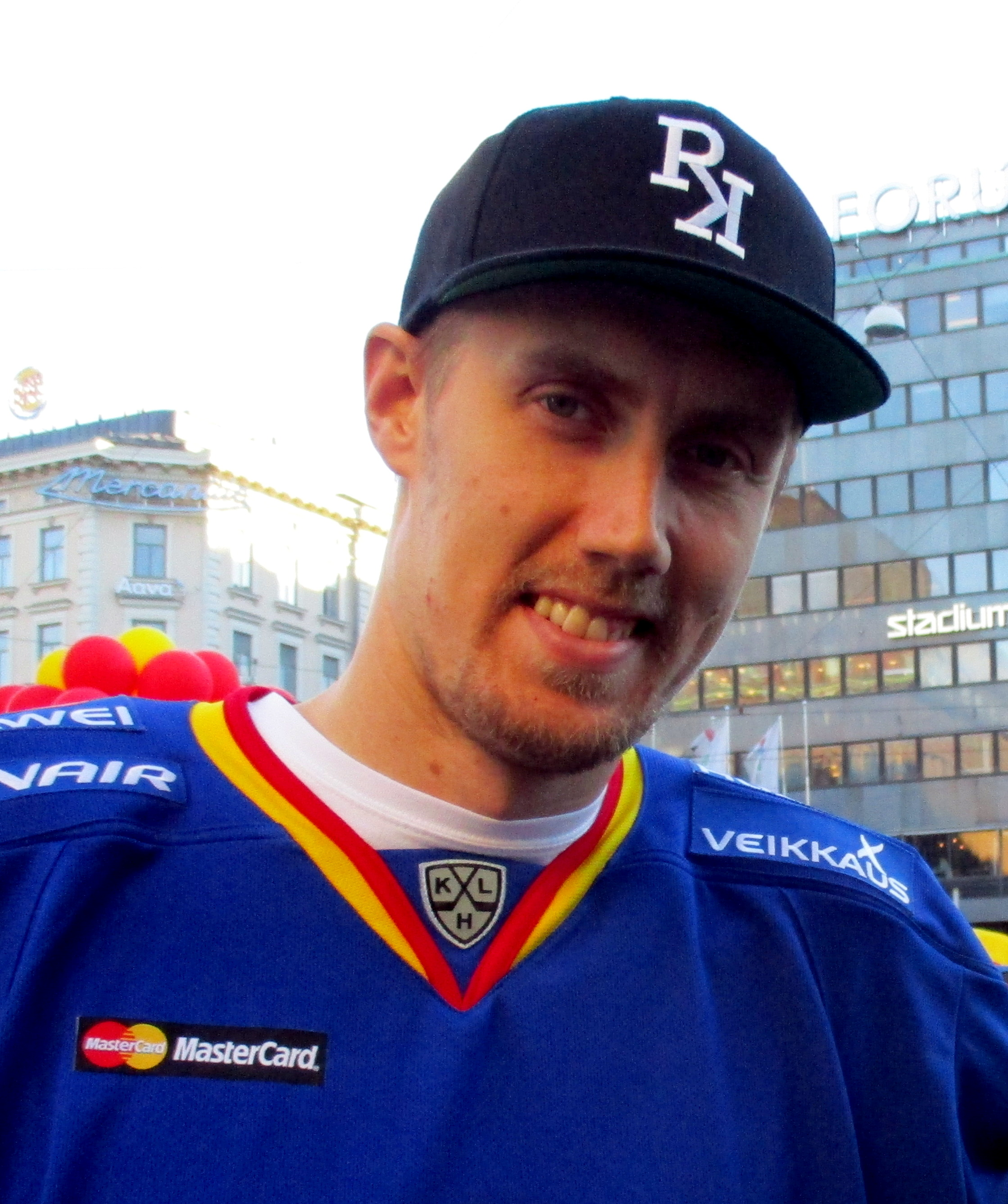
- Marko Anttila in 2016
- Born: 27 May 1985 (age 41) Lempäälä, Finland
- Height: 6 ft 8 in (203 cm)
- Weight: 229 lb (104 kg; 16 st 5 lb)
- Position: Right wing
- Shot: Right
- Played for: HC TPS; Metallurg Novokuznetsk; Örebro HK; Jokerit; Ilves; Oulun Kärpät
- National team: Finland
- NHL draft: 260th overall, 2004; Chicago Blackhawks
- Playing career: 2003–2025

Marko Anttila (born 27 May 1985) is a retired Finnish professional ice hockey forward. Anttila was selected by Chicago Blackhawks in the 9th round (260th overall) of the 2004 NHL entry draft. His nickname among his teammates is "Stretch" ("Stretsi" in Finnish), which was given to him by Steve Kariya due to his large physical stature, but among the Finnish fans, he is more commonly known as "Mörkö".

He played for several teams, both in Finland and in Europe. He is best remembered in Finland for captaining the national team in several occasions, winning two World Championships and one Olympic gold with the team.

== Playing career ==
Marko Anttila played his first senior-level ice hockey games during the 2003–04 season. Anttila's first team was his hometown team Lempäälän Kisa of Lempäälä.

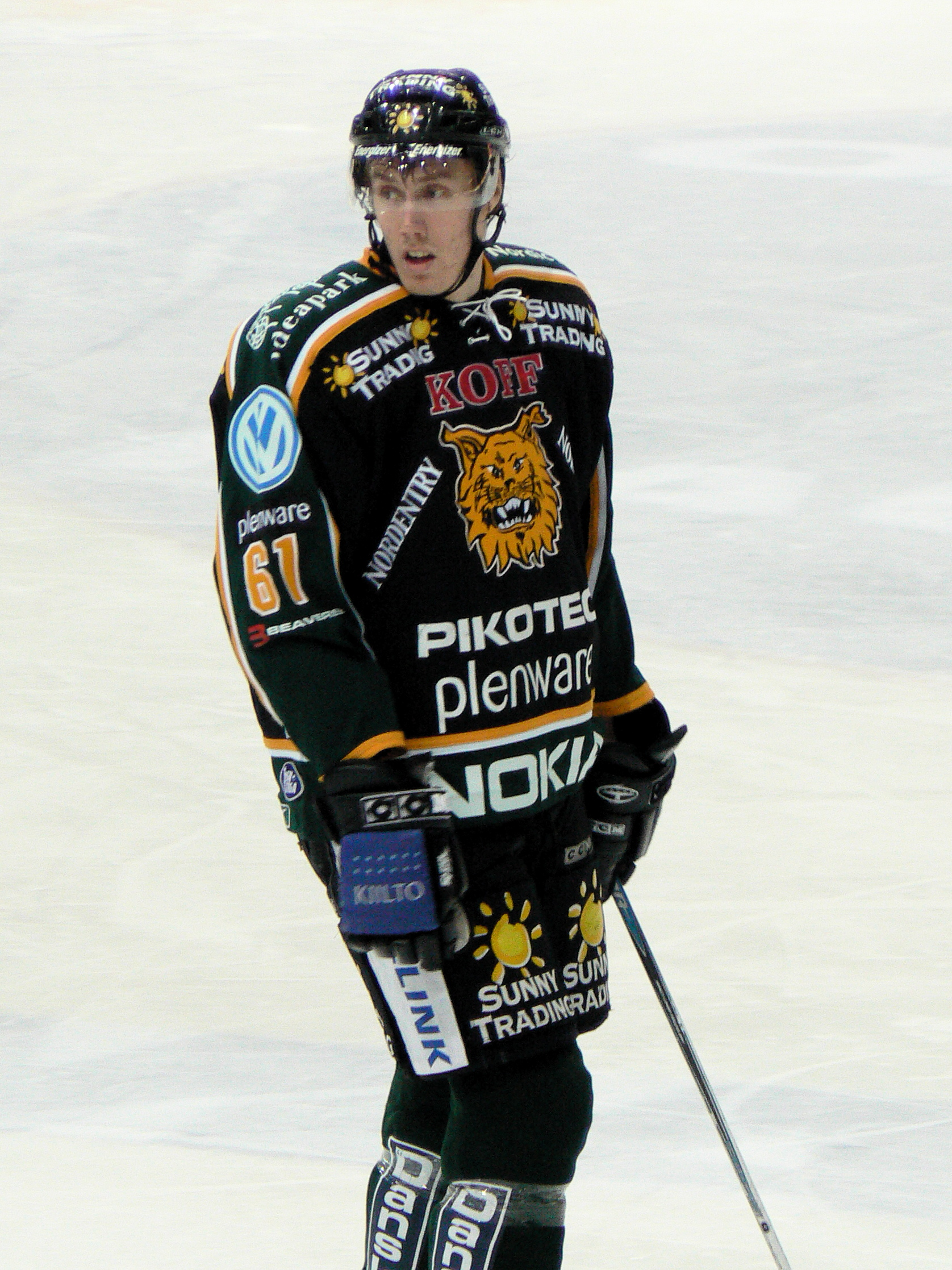
Marko Anttila

Anttila scored 38 points in 22 Suomi-sarja regular season games during his debut season. Though playing at the 3rd highest level in Finland, Anttila was drafted by the Chicago Blackhawks in the 2004 NHL entry draft while he was playing for LeKi. It is believed that Anttila's connections with Chicago's scout for Finland, Sakari Pietilä, was the reason why he was drafted. His large size (over 6'8 ft tall) combined with his hard slap shot was the most convincing factors that influenced Sakari Pietilä to suggest him to the Blackhawks.

After being drafted while playing for a small town's team, Anttila soon was reckoned as a player to invest in. Marko Anttila was contracted by Ilves in 2004. Anttila struggled during his first season in SM-liiga but soon got the hang of playing at higher levels.

In 2007–08, Anttila scored his SM-liiga career-high when he racked up 23 points in 56 games, and he was selected to play for the Finnish National team during the European Hockey Tour.

On 26 April 2011, Anttila made a one-year contract with TPS. In June 2013, it was announced that Anttila would join Metallurg Novokuznetsk of the KHL.

After parts of three seasons with Örebro HK of the Swedish Hockey League, Anttila returned to the KHL, linking up on a one-year deal with Finnish-based club Jokerit on 20 April 2016.

During the 2016–17 season, having added a physical presence to the checking lines, Anttila agreed to a two-year contract extension to remain with Jokerit on 8 January 2017.

Anttila remained with Jokerit for six years before the club's withdrawal to the KHL before the playoffs in the 2021–22 season due to the Russian invasion of Ukraine. He subsequently joined his original Finnish club, Ilves of the Liiga, on 28 February 2022, for the remainder of the campaign.

On 16 June 2022, it was announced that Anttila has signed for Oulun Kärpät for the 2022–23 season. During the season he signed one-year extension. His contract was extended one-year further for the 2024–25 season. He was appointed as the captain of Kärpät for the season, which turned out to be his last, as he retired after the disappointing season.

== International play ==
Medal record

Representing Finland

Ice hockey

Olympic Games
Gold medal – first place	2022 Beijing	

World Championships
Gold medal – first place	2019 Slovakia	
Gold medal – first place	2022 Finland	
Silver medal – second place	2021 Latvia	

In 2019, Anttila served as captain when Finland won their third gold medal in the Ice Hockey World Championships. In the quarterfinals, while playing 6-on-5, he scored the 4–4 goal against Sweden to tie the game late in the third period. Finland would go on to win in overtime. He scored the only goal in the semi-final game against Russia, and in the final against Canada, he scored two goals, including the game-winning goal leading Finland to a 3–1 victory.

== Career statistics ==
=== Regular season and playoffs ===
			Regular season					Playoffs
Season	Team	League	GP	G	A	Pts	PIM	GP	G	A	Pts	PIM
2002–03	LeKi	FIN.2 U18	11	17	8	25	41	—	—	—	—	—
2003–04	LeKi	FIN.3 U20	12	11	11	22	26	—	—	—	—	—
2003–04	LeKi	FIN.4	22	19	19	38	30	—	—	—	—	—
2004–05	Ilves	Jr. A	27	14	6	20	44	9	5	7	12	14
2004–05	Ilves	SM-l	28	2	1	3	10	3	0	0	0	0
2005–06	Ilves	Jr. A	10	4	2	6	6	2	1	1	2	4
2005–06	Ilves	SM-l	50	4	3	7	46	4	0	0	0	0
2006–07	Ilves	SM-l	53	2	2	4	34	7	1	0	1	8
2007–08	Ilves	SM-l	56	14	9	23	90	9	2	2	4	4
2008–09	Ilves	SM-l	58	8	14	22	69	3	0	0	0	2
2009–10	Ilves	SM-l	57	8	18	26	52	—	—	—	—	—
2010–11	Ilves	SM-l	33	5	8	13	26	6	2	1	3	4
2011–12	TPS	SM-l	59	14	22	36	36	2	0	1	1	4
2012–13	TPS	SM-l	60	17	24	41	68	—	—	—	—	—
2013–14	Metallurg Novokuznetsk	KHL	16	2	4	6	10	—	—	—	—	—
2013–14	Ariada Volzhsk	VHL	6	2	3	5	6	—	—	—	—	—
2013–14	Örebro HK	SHL	22	13	7	20	30	—	—	—	—	—
2014–15	Örebro HK	SHL	52	14	6	20	16	6	0	1	1	8
2015–16	Örebro HK	SHL	49	8	6	14	28	2	1	1	2	35
2016–17	Jokerit	KHL	56	7	9	16	41	4	0	1	1	2
2017–18	Jokerit	KHL	52	8	8	16	26	10	1	1	2	10
2018–19	Jokerit	KHL	38	11	4	15	21	6	1	2	3	2
2019–20	Jokerit	KHL	61	11	7	18	14	6	2	2	4	4
2020–21	Jokerit	KHL	57	8	6	14	44	4	0	0	0	14
2021–22	Jokerit	KHL	40	6	5	11	17	—	—	—	—	—
2021–22	Ilves	Liiga	10	2	1	3	4	14	1	2	3	4
2022–23	Kärpät	Liiga	58	13	4	17	18	3	0	1	1	2
2023–24	Kärpät	Liiga	60	13	14	27	22	12	0	2	2	10
2024–25	Kärpät	Liiga	50	6	3	9	22	—	—	—	—	—
Liiga totals			627	108	123	231	504	68	6	11	17	40
KHL totals			320	53	43	96	173	30	4	6	10	32

=== International ===
Year	Team	Event	Result	GP	G	A	Pts	PIM
2013	Finland	WC	4th	7	0	1	1	2
2018	Finland	OG	6th	3	0	1	1	2
2018	Finland	WC	5th	8	2	2	4	2
2019	Finland	WC	1st place, gold medalist(s)	10	4	0	4	4
2021	Finland	WC	2nd place, silver medalist(s)	10	0	3	3	4
2022	Finland	OG	1st place, gold medalist(s)	5	2	1	3	0
2022	Finland	WC	1st place, gold medalist(s)	10	2	3	5	6
2023	Finland	WC	7th	8	2	1	3	2
Senior totals				61	12	12	24	22

== Awards and honours ==
Award	Year
Liiga
Bronze medal	2021–22, 2023–24
