= Iiro Pakarinen =

Finnish ice hockey player (born 1991)

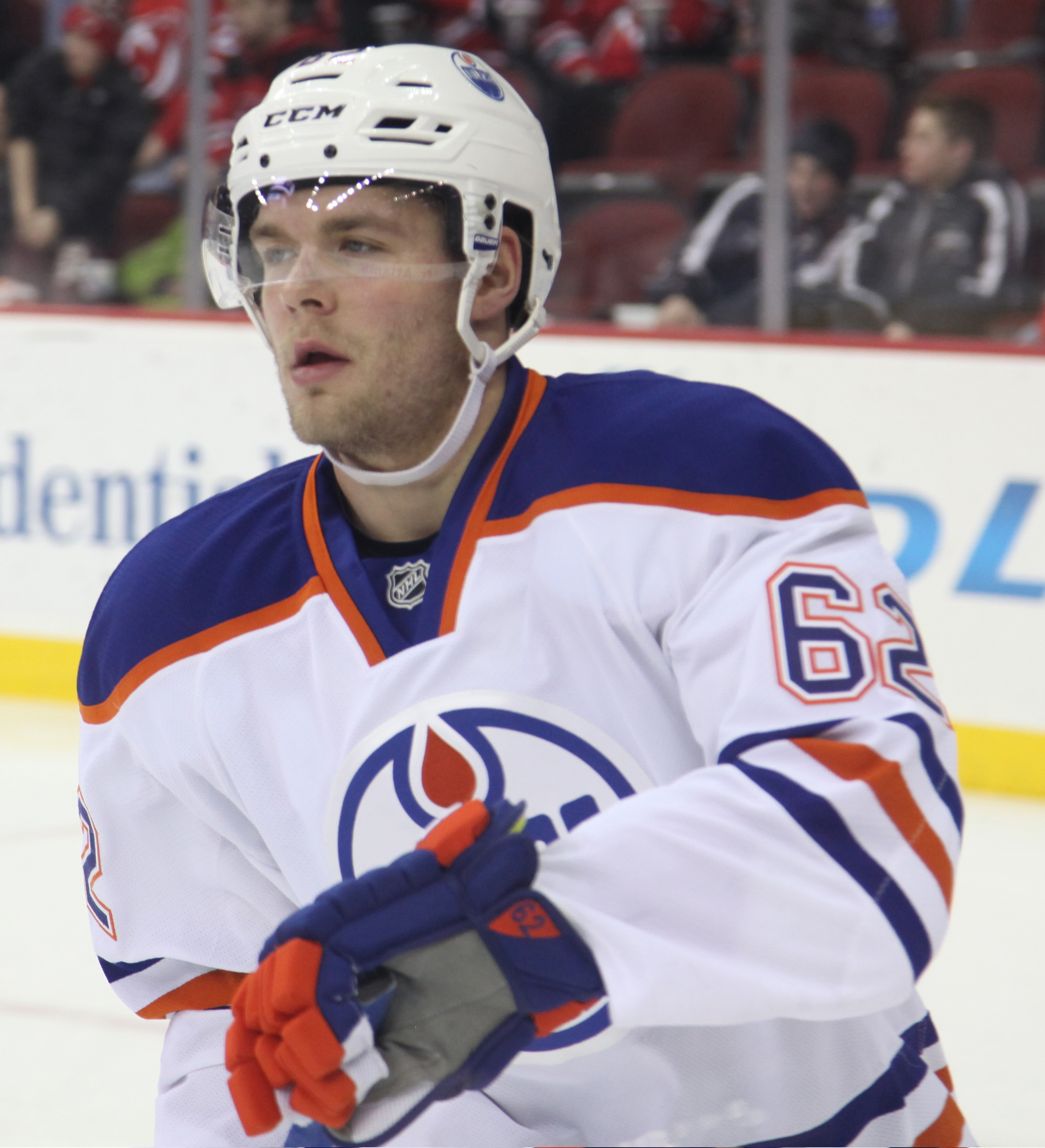
- Pakarinen in February 2015
- Born: 25 August 1991 (age 34) Suonenjoki, Finland
- Height: 6 ft 1 in (185 cm)
- Weight: 216 lb (98 kg; 15 st 6 lb)
- Position: Right wing
- Shoots: Right
- Liiga team Former teams: HIFK; KalPa; Edmonton Oilers; Metallurg Magnitogorsk; Barys Nur-Sultan; Jokerit
- National team: Finland
- NHL draft: 184th overall, 2011; Florida Panthers
- Playing career: 2009–present

Iiro Pakarinen (born 25 August 1991) is a Finnish professional ice hockey player for HIFK of the Finnish Liiga. Pakarinen previously played in Liiga with KalPa and has also played in the Kontinental Hockey League (KHL) with Jokerit, Metallurg Magnitogorsk, and Barys Nur-Sultan, and in the National Hockey League (NHL) with the Edmonton Oilers.

== Playing career ==
Pakarinen played in his native Finland from his youth level with the professional Liiga club, KalPa. As a skilled, versatile forward, Pakarinen was drafted 184th overall in the 2011 NHL entry draft by the Florida Panthers. Unable to agree to terms with the Panthers, Pakarinen continued his development in the Finnish Liiga with KalPa. On 3 May 2012, he joined HIFK as a free agent on a two-year contract.

Upon completion of his second season with HIFK in 2013–14 and scoring a career-high 20 goals and 30 points, Pakarinen signed his first NHL contract as a free agent with the Edmonton Oilers on a two-year entry-level deal on 16 June 2014. On 1 December 2017, he was placed on waivers by the Oilers, and was then sent to their AHL affiliate, the Bakersfield Condors, on 2 December.

On 2 July 2018, Pakarinen left the Oilers and the NHL as a free agent, signing a one-year contract with Russian club, Metallurg Magnitogorsk of the KHL. In the 2018–19 season, Pakarinen made as positive impact with Metallurg, producing 19 goals and 26 points in 60 games.

On 2 May 2019, having concluded his contract with Metallurg, Pakarinen continued in the KHL, signing a one-year deal with Kazakh-based, Barys Nur-Sultan. In the following 2019–20 season, Pakarinen suffered an injury-hit year, featuring in just 22 games and registering 10 points. He collected 1 goal in 5 post-season games before the playoffs were canceled due to COVID-19.

On 11 May 2020, Pakarinen opted to return to Finland and remain in the KHL, signing a three-year contract with Jokerit.

== Career statistics ==
=== Regular season and playoffs ===
			Regular season					Playoffs
Season	Team	League	GP	G	A	Pts	PIM	GP	G	A	Pts	PIM
2007–08	KalPa	FIN U18	20	14	14	28	59	2	0	0	0	4
2007–08	KalPa	FIN U20	1	0	0	0	0	—	—	—	—	—
2008–09	KalPa	FIN U18 Q	2	2	0	2	2	—	—	—	—	—
2008–09	KalPa	FIN U20	37	11	10	21	44	5	1	0	1	2
2009–10	KalPa	FIN U20	11	8	4	12	10	—	—	—	—	—
2009–10	KalPa	SM-l	38	3	5	8	37	12	3	0	3	8
2009–10	Suomi U20	Mestis	6	1	2	3	6	—	—	—	—	—
2010–11	KalPa	FIN U20	4	3	2	5	6	—	—	—	—	—
2010–11	KalPa	SM-l	46	7	3	10	34	7	1	0	1	37
2010–11	Suomi U20	Mestis	3	0	0	0	0	—	—	—	—	—
2011–12	KalPa	SM-l	54	10	3	13	47	7	2	2	4	0
2012–13	HIFK	SM-l	33	5	7	12	6	6	3	0	3	4
2013–14	HIFK	Liiga	60	20	10	30	32	2	0	0	0	2
2014–15	Oklahoma City Barons	AHL	39	17	11	28	20	—	—	—	—	—
2014–15	Edmonton Oilers	NHL	17	1	2	3	2	—	—	—	—	—
2015–16	Bakersfield Condors	AHL	4	1	2	3	4	—	—	—	—	—
2015–16	Edmonton Oilers	NHL	63	5	8	13	8	—	—	—	—	—
2016–17	Bakersfield Condors	AHL	5	0	1	1	4	—	—	—	—	—
2016–17	Edmonton Oilers	NHL	14	2	2	4	2	1	0	0	0	0
2017–18	Edmonton Oilers	NHL	40	2	1	3	6	—	—	—	—	—
2017–18	Bakersfield Condors	AHL	18	9	4	13	2	—	—	—	—	—
2018–19	Metallurg Magnitogorsk	KHL	60	19	7	26	6	6	0	1	1	2
2019–20	Barys Nur–Sultan	KHL	22	4	6	10	2	5	1	0	1	2
2020–21	Jokerit	KHL	32	9	6	15	24	4	0	1	1	4
2021–22	Jokerit	KHL	46	10	10	20	10	—	—	—	—	—
2021–22	HIFK	Liiga	11	4	0	4	4	7	0	3	3	0
2022–23	HIFK	Liiga	58	19	17	36	47	12	7	1	8	2
2023–24	HIFK	Liiga	59	18	12	30	10	7	1	3	4	6
2024–25	HIFK	Liiga	58	30	12	42	37	4	0	1	1	2
2025–26	HIFK	Liiga	22	6	5	11	39	5	0	0	0	2
Liiga totals			439	122	74	196	293	69	17	10	27	63
NHL totals			134	10	13	23	18	1	0	0	0	0
KHL totals			160	42	29	71	42	15	1	2	3	8

=== International ===
Medal record

Representing Finland

Ice hockey

Olympic Games
Gold medal – first place	2022 Beijing	

World Championships
Silver medal – second place	2014 Minsk	
Silver medal – second place	2021 Latvia	

Year	Team	Event	Result	GP	G	A	Pts	PIM
2009	Finland	WJC18	3rd place, bronze medalist(s)	6	1	1	2	2
2010	Finland	WJC	5th	6	1	1	2	2
2011	Finland	WJC	6th	6	1	2	3	2
2014	Finland	WC	2nd place, silver medalist(s)	10	3	0	3	2
2021	Finland	WC	2nd place, silver medalist(s)	10	4	1	5	14
2022	Finland	OG	1st place, gold medalist(s)	6	3	0	3	2
2024	Finland	WC	8th	8	0	2	2	0
Junior totals				18	3	4	7	6
Senior totals				34	10	3	13	18
