= Petteri Lindbohm =

Finnish ice hockey player (born 1993)

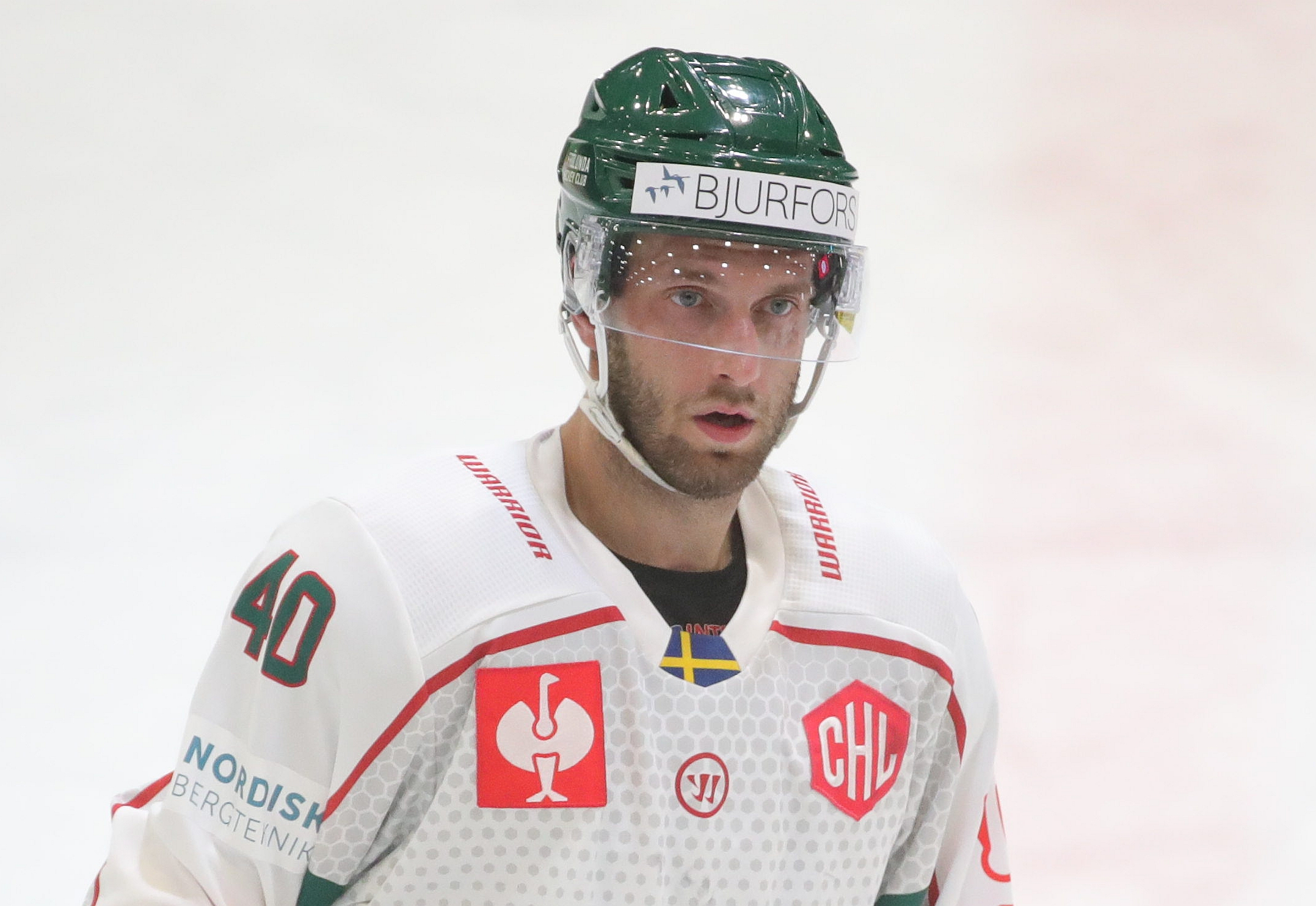
- Lindbohm in 2022
- Born: September 23, 1993 (age 33) Helsinki, Finland
- Height: 6 ft 2 in (188 cm)
- Weight: 196 lb (89 kg; 14 st 0 lb)
- Position: Defence
- Shoots: Left
- Liiga team Former teams: HIFK; Jokerit; Ässät; St. Louis Blues; Lausanne HC; EHC Biel; Florida Panthers; Frölunda HC
- National team: Finland
- NHL draft: 176th overall, 2012; St. Louis Blues
- Playing career: 2012–present

Petteri Lindbohm (born September 23, 1993, in Vantaa, Finland) is a Finnish professional ice hockey defenceman currently playing for HIFK of the Liiga. He has previously played with Lausanne HC and EHC Biel of the National League (NL), Jokerit of the Kontinental Hockey League (KHL), and with the St. Louis Blues and Florida Panthers of the National Hockey League (NHL). The Blues selected him in the 6th round (176th overall) of the 2012 NHL entry draft.

== Playing career ==
Lindbohm played in his native Finnish Liiga during the 2012–13 and 2013–14 seasons. On March 21, 2014, he signed a three-year, entry-level deal with the St. Louis Blues.

In the 2014–15 season, his first in North America, Lindbohm primarily played with the Blues' AHL affiliate Chicago Wolves, appearing in 53 games. Lindbohm also skated in 23 games for the Blues, scoring two goals and 3 points. Lindbohm scored his first career NHL goal on February 20, 2015, in a 5–1 victory over the Boston Bruins.

On September 11, 2017, the Blues re-signed Lindbohm as a restricted free agent to a one-year, two-way contract. He was reassigned to continue his tenure with the Chicago Wolves in the 2017–18 season.

On July 27, 2018, as a restricted free agent from the Blues, Lindbohm left North America and signed a one-year contract in Switzerland worth CHF 700,000 with Lausanne HC of the National League (NL). Right after winning gold with Finland at the 2019 IIHF World Championship, Lausanne signed Lindbohm to a one-year contract extension worth CHF 750,000. On May 20, 2020, Lausanne HC announced that Lindbohm would not return to the team for the 2020–21 season.

On July 30, 2020, Lindbohm agreed to a one-year contract with EHC Biel to remain in the National League for the 2020–21 season.

Following his third season in the NL, Lindbohm left as a free agent and returned to his original club, Jokerit, now of the KHL, on a two-year agreement on May 5, 2021. In the 2021–22 season, Lindbohm playing in a top-four shutdown role registered three goals and 8 points from the blueline, helping Jokerit to a second-place finish in the regular season.

With Jokerit withdrawing from the KHL playoffs, Lindbohm was released from his contract as a free agent and returned to the NHL in agreeing to a one-year, $750,000 contract with the Florida Panthers for the remainder of the 2021–22 season on March 1, 2022.

As a free agent from the Panthers, Lindbohm returned to Europe and agreed on a one-year contract to play with his first Swedish club, Frölunda HC of the SHL, on August 2, 2022.

== International play ==
Medal record

Ice hockey

Representing Finland

Olympic Games
Gold medal – first place	2022 Beijing	

World Championships
Gold medal – first place	2019 Slovakia	
Silver medal – second place	2021 Latvia	

Lindbohm first represented Finland on the international stage at the 2011 IIHF World U18 Championships before later captaining the junior squad at the 2013 World Junior Ice Hockey Championships.

He made his senior debut with Finland, claiming gold at the 2019 IIHF World Championship in Slovakia and the silver medal in the 2021 IIHF World Championship in Riga, Latvia. He was named to the Finnish Olympic team at the 2022 Winter Olympics held in Beijing, China. He registered two assists through 6 games helping Finland capture an historic first Olympic gold medal, following a 2–1 victory over the Russian Olympic Committee.

== Career statistics ==
=== Regular season and playoffs ===
			Regular season					Playoffs
Season	Team	League	GP	G	A	Pts	PIM	GP	G	A	Pts	PIM
2009–10	Kiekko–Vantaa	FIN U18 Q	8	0	2	2	24	—	—	—	—	—
2009–10	Kiekko–Vantaa	FIN U18	26	1	1	2	26	3	0	0	0	8
2010–11	Blues	FIN U18 Q	2	1	1	2	2	—	—	—	—	—
2010–11	Blues	FIN U18	5	1	5	6	8	2	0	2	2	2
2010–11	Blues	FIN U20	41	1	8	9	56	13	0	3	3	12
2011–12	Jokerit	FIN U20	41	3	7	10	98	12	0	3	3	12
2011–12	Kiekko–Vantaa	Mestis	5	0	3	3	8	—	—	—	—	—
2012–13	Jokerit	FIN U20	2	0	1	1	2	—	—	—	—	—
2012–13	Jokerit	SM-l	35	0	4	4	61	—	—	—	—	—
2012–13	Kiekko–Vantaa	Mestis	6	3	0	3	4	—	—	—	—	—
2013–14	Jokerit	FIN U20	3	0	0	0	4	—	—	—	—	—
2013–14	Jokerit	Liiga	18	0	1	1	18	—	—	—	—	—
2013–14	Kiekko–Vantaa	Mestis	13	1	1	2	12	—	—	—	—	—
2013–14	Ässät	Liiga	19	1	4	5	8	—	—	—	—	—
2014–15	Chicago Wolves	AHL	53	6	12	18	62	5	0	1	1	10
2014–15	St. Louis Blues	NHL	23	2	1	3	26	—	—	—	—	—
2015–16	Chicago Wolves	AHL	43	3	8	11	50	—	—	—	—	—
2015–16	St. Louis Blues	NHL	10	0	0	0	7	—	—	—	—	—
2016–17	Chicago Wolves	AHL	52	8	8	16	54	9	1	3	4	2
2016–17	St. Louis Blues	NHL	7	0	0	0	4	—	—	—	—	—
2017–18	Chicago Wolves	AHL	23	1	2	3	21	—	—	—	—	—
2018–19	Lausanne HC	NL	41	4	11	15	24	12	0	3	3	8
2019–20	Lausanne HC	NL	50	8	15	23	52	—	—	—	—	—
2020–21	EHC Biel	NL	44	4	10	14	49	2	0	0	0	0
2021–22	Jokerit	KHL	45	3	5	8	28	—	—	—	—	—
2021–22	Florida Panthers	NHL	9	0	1	1	5	—	—	—	—	—
2022–23	Frölunda HC	SHL	52	6	8	14	28	13	0	2	2	14
2023–24	HIFK	Liiga	43	8	6	14	28	7	0	1	1	12
2024–25	HIFK	Liiga	19	0	4	4	8	—	—	—	—	—
2025–26	HIFK	Liiga	27	3	5	8	41	5	1	0	1	2
Liiga totals			161	12	24	36	164	12	1	1	2	14
NHL totals			49	2	2	4	42	—	—	—	—	—

=== International ===
Year	Team	Event	Result	GP	G	A	Pts	PIM
2011	Finland	WJC18	5th	6	0	0	0	0
2013	Finland	WJC	7th	6	0	2	2	4
2019	Finland	WC	1st place, gold medalist(s)	10	2	1	3	6
2021	Finland	WC	2nd place, silver medalist(s)	9	1	1	2	0
2022	Finland	OG	1st place, gold medalist(s)	6	0	2	2	2
Junior totals				12	0	2	2	4
Senior totals				25	3	4	7	8
